= List of Punjabi University people =

This is a list of alumni of the Punjabi University, listed in alphabetical order by first name. The Punjabi University, Patiala founded in 1962, has among its alumni many who have become notable, including Member of parliament, Lok Sabha, members of the Punjab Legislative Assembly and several famous people in areas such as Punjabi literature, social sciences, economics, philosophy, and music. More recently, due to expansion into areas of technology, it has also produced notable computer scientists.

== B ==
- Baldev Raj Gupta, languages faculty
- Balraj Pandit, Theatre faculty
- Binnu Dhillon

== D ==
- Dalip Kaur Tiwana, famous Punjabi writer and faculty
- Devinder Shory
- Davinder Singh

== G ==
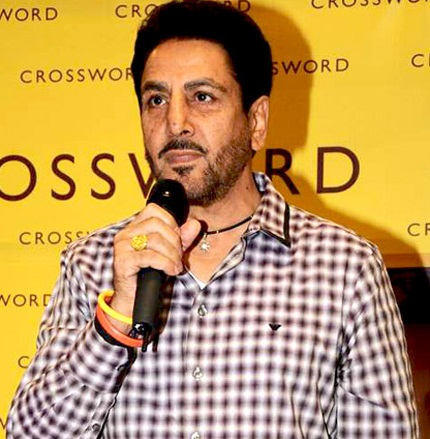
Gurdas Maan, Punjabi singer

- Gagandeep Kaur, Indian archer
- Gulzar Singh Sandhu, journalism faculty
- Gurdas Maan, Punjabi singer
- Gurpreet Singh Lehal, computer science faculty

== H ==
- Hardiljeet Singh 'Lalli', linguistics faculty
- Harjinder Kaur, Indian weightlifter

== J ==
- Jagmeet Singh Brar

== K ==
- Kirpal Singh Narang, former Vice-chancellor
- Kulwinder Billa

== N ==
- Navneet Kaur Dhillon, Miss India 2013
- Navnindra Behl, Theatre faculty
- Nirmal Rishi

== O ==
- Om Puri

== P ==
- Pamma Dumewal
- Pammi Bai, Folk singer
- Parminder Singh Dhindsa, Politician
- Parneet Kaur, Archer

== R ==
- Rasneet Lobana
- Rachhpal Singh Aujla, MBBS passout of year 1958 from first batch of Government Medical College, Patiala
- Raj Babbar
- Ram Gopal Bajaj, Department of Dramatic Arts
- Rana Ranbir
- Ravi Deep

== S ==
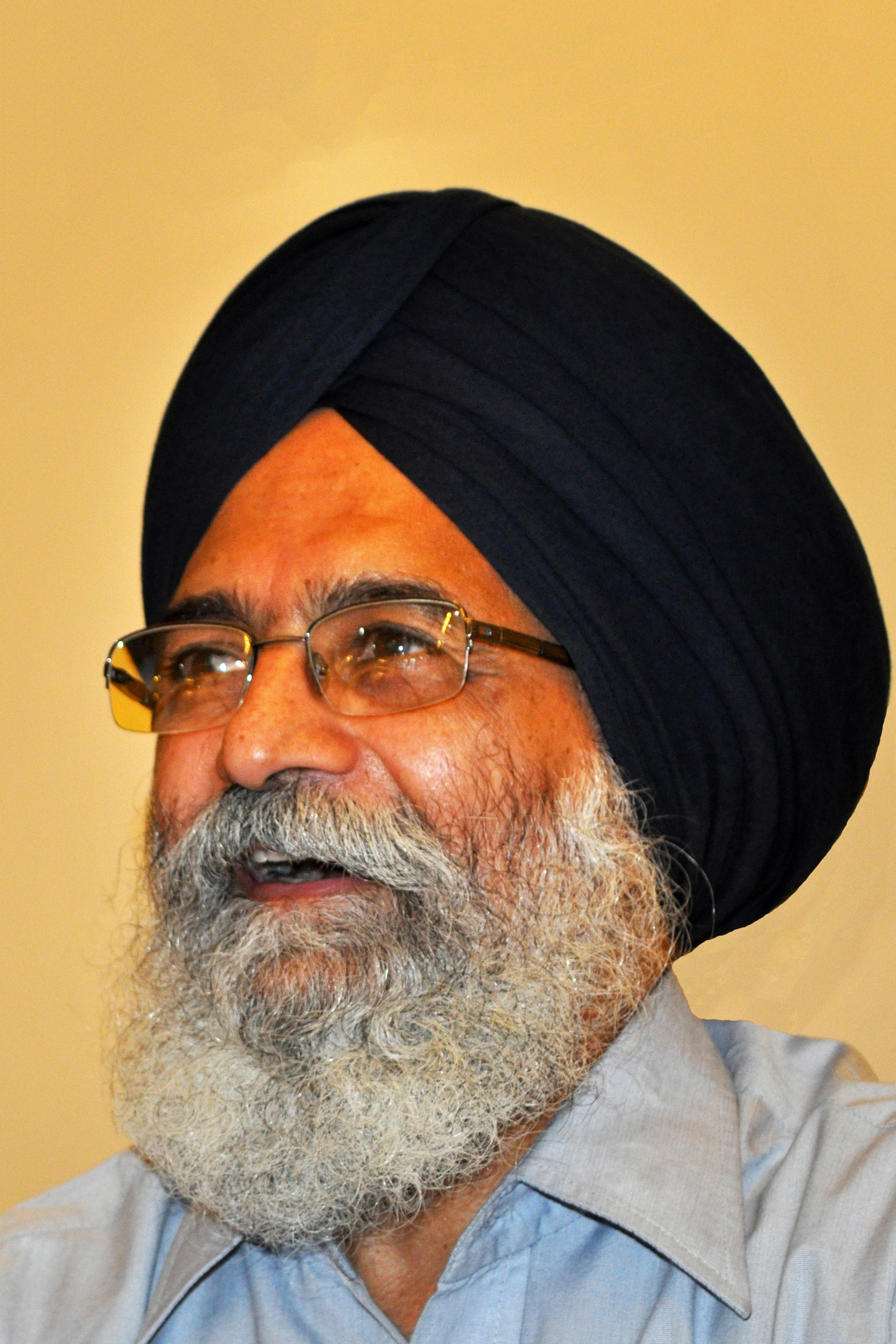
Surjit Patar, Punjabi poet

- Samuel John
- Sanju Solanki
- Sardar Anjum, famous poet and Urdu faculty
- Sardara Singh Johl
- Sunita Dhir, Punjabi film actress and Theatre & Television faculty
- Surjit Patar, famous Punjabi poet
- Surjit Singh Sethi, founder of Speech, Drama and Music Department (Department of Theatre and Television)
- Dr. S S Joshi, he was Head of Department of Anthropological Linguistics & Department of Lexicography. He also served as Dean Language Faculty, Director Planning, Director Audio Visual Research Centre

== See also ==
- Punjabi University
- Punjabi University Guru Kashi Campus
