= List of people from Patiala =

City in Punjab, India

This is a list of notable people from Patiala, a city in Punjab, India.

Name	Description
Maharaja Baba Ala Singh	Founder and Maharaja of Princely State Patiala
Bibi Rajindar Kaur	Sikh princess and cousin of Maharaja Amar Singh
Mahendra Singh of Patiala	Maharaja of Princely State Patiala
Bibi Sahib Kaur	Sikh princess and elder sister of Raja Sahib Singh Sidhu of Patiala
Maharaja Rajinder Singh	Maharaja of Princely State Patiala
Bhupinder Singh	Grandfather of Captain Amarinder Singh and Maharaja of Princely State Patiala
Mohinder Kaur	Rajmata of Patiala and Mother of Captain Amarinder Singh
Captain Amarinder Singh	29th Chief Minister of Punjab
Preneet Kaur	MP & Minister of State for External Affairs (Central Govt. under PM Manmohan Singh)
Ajit Pal Singh Kohli	MLA Patiala, Former Patiala Mayor and Businessman
Ranbir Pushp Kaushal	Bollywood Writer and Novelist. Nominated for Filmfare Award
Bibi Amtus Salam	Social worker
Pawan Kumar Bansal	Four times MP, Union Minister of India (twice)
Prem Singh Chandumajra	Member of Parliament from Patiala
Surjit Singh Rakhra	Member of Legislative Assembly
Raninder Singh	President of National Rifle Association of India (NRAI)
Bhupinder Singh (musician)	Singer and musician
Balraj Pandit	Theatre director, playwright
Jimmy Shergill	Actor
Gavie Chahal	Actor
Rakesh Sharma	First Indian astronaut
Dalip Kaur Tiwana	Punjabi writer
Damandeep Singh Baggan	Dub-over voice actor
Roopinder Singh	Assistant Editor of The Tribune; writer
Harpal Tiwana	Actor, writer and director
Samiksha	Actor
Smeep Kang	Actor, writer and director
Mahendra Sandhu	Actor and director
Dev Kharoud	Actor
Nav Bajwa	Actor
Satwinder Bitti	Punjabi singer
Harbhajan Mann	Punjabi singer and actor
Mika Singh	Punjabi singer and actor
Dilshad Khan	Husband of Parveen Sultana; member of Patiala Gharana; singer
Fateh Ali Khan	Member of Patiala Gharana; singer
Hamid Ali Khan	Member of Patiala Gharana; singer
Jagdish Prasad	Member of Patiala Gharana; singer
Kaushiki Chakraborty	Daughter of Ajoy Chakraborty; member of Patiala Gharana; singer
Lakshmi Shankar	Member of Patiala Gharana; singer
Munawar Ali Khan	Son of Bade Ghulam Ali Khan; member of Patiala Gharana; singer
Nirmala Devi	Member of Patiala Gharana; singer
Parveen Sultana	Member of Patiala Gharana; singer
Raza Ali Khan	Grandson of Bade Ghulam Ali Khan; member of Patiala Gharana; singer
Sanjukta Ghosh	Member of Patiala Gharana; singer
Shafqat Amanat Ali	Member of Patiala Gharana; singer
Mohammad Hussain Sarahang from Afghanistan	Member of Patiala Gharana; singer
Daler Mehndi	Punjabi singer
Pammi Bai	Punjabi singer
Malkit Singh	Punjabi singer
Vicky Dhaliwal	Lyricist
Kamal Khan (singer)	Singer
Tochi Raina	Singer
Harrdy Sandhu	Singer and Actor
Navneet Kaur Dhillon	Femina Miss India 2013
Rachel Gupta	Miss Grand International 2024
Navjot Singh Sidhu	Former cricketer, actor, commentator and politician
Dhruv Pandove	Former cricketer
Mohinder Amarnath	Cricketer
Sandeep Sharma	Cricketer
Sarabjit Ladda	Cricketer
Anmol Malhotra	Cricketer
Anmolpreet Singh	Cricketer
Prabhsimran Singh	Cricketer
Karan Kaila	Cricketer
Ish Sodhi	Cricketer
Ravi Inder Singh	Cricketer
Jiwanjot Singh	Cricketer
Mayank Markande	Cricketer
Sanvir Singh	Cricketer
Deepak Thakur	Hockey Player
Heena Sidhu	Shooter
Abhinav Bindra	First Indian to win an individual gold medal at the Olympics
Man Kaur	Athlete
Rishi Patialvi	Urdu poet
Narinder Singh Kapoor	Punjabi Writer
Gulzar Singh Sandhu	Journalism faculty
Gurdas Maan	Punjabi singer
Gurpreet Singh Lehal	Computer science faculty
Jagmeet Singh Brar	Politician, Lawyer, Writer and Poet
Parneet Kaur	Compound Archer
Sardar Anjum	Poet and Urdu faculty
Sardara Singh Johl	Economist
Surjit Patar	Punjabi poet
Bhagwant Singh Mann	Chief Minister Of Punjab
Binnu Dhillon	Actor and Comedian
Ammy Virk	Singer and Actor
