= Surjit Singh Sethi =

- Born: 1928
- Died: 1995
- Occupations: Playwright, writer

Surjit Singh Sethi (1928–1995) was an Indian playwright, novelist, short story writer and lyricist who wrote in Punjabi. He was also a film maker and theatre personality.

== Biography ==
Surjit Singh Sethi was born at Gujarkhan, Punjab Province, British India in 1928. He did his M.A. in English and submitted his thesis on Ibsenism (Dramatics) for Ph.D. He worked at All India Radio for some time as a producer. He was the founder of Speech, Drama and Music Department at Punjabi University which was later turned into the Theatre and Television Department. He groomed a number of students into stage, TV and film celebrities, and was influenced by modern trends of Western theatre. Sethi died in 1995.

== Dramas ==
- Parde Pichhon (Behind the Curtain), One Act Plays, 1946
- Chalde Phirde But (The Loitering Figures), One Act Plays
- Kandhi Ute Rukhda (A Tree on the Embankment), 1957
- Coffee House, 1958
- Kaccha Ghada (The Earthen Pitcher), 1960
- Kadaryar, 1960
- Bhareya Bhareya Sakhna Sakhna, 1964
- King, Mirza Te Sapera, 1965
- Gurbin Ghor Andhar (Pitch Dark Without the Guru), 1969
- Safar Baqi, Talash Baqi (The Journey Remains, The Quest Remains)
- Nangi Sarak Raat Da Ohla (The Naked Road and The Reflection of The Night), 1971
- Abara Kadabara, 1972
- Mard Mard Nahi Tiwin Tiwin Nahi (Man is Not a Man and Woman is Not a Woman)
- Eh Zindagi Hai Dosto
- Mera Murshid Mod Liao (Bring Back My Messiah), 1975
- Pebble Beach Te Laung Guacha

== Novels ==
- Ret Da Pahad (Mound of Sand), 1954
- Ik Shahr Di Gal (The Story of a City), 1955
- Kandhi Ute Rukhda (A Tree on The Embankment), 1957
- Ik Khali Pyala (An Empty Bowl), 1960
- Kal vi suraj nahin chadhega (The Sun Shall Not Rise Tomorrow Again), 1967
- Abra ki Adabra, 1972
- Dubde Suraj Nun Salam, 1976

== Short stories ==
- Angrez Angrez San (So Were The English)
- Men Kahani Da Safar (Journey of My Stories), 1972

== Other books ==
- Kavi Chatrik (Chatrik, The Poet) Criticism, 1955
- Natak Kala, 1974
- Langh Gaye Darya (Biography), 1976
- Shot in 12 days: The Making of Mughlani Begum

== Films ==
- Mughlani Begum
- Sandli

== Awards and honours ==
- Honoured with Prof. Piara Singh Gill & Karam Singh Sandhu Memorial Antar-Rashtari Shiromani Sahitkaar/Kalakaar Award, by the International Association of Punjabi Authors and Artists (IAPAA) in 1984.

== Notes ==
- Primarily a playwright, he wrote short stories and novels also.
- His first full-length play, Coffee house is a portrayal of 'hollow men'.
- Kaccha Ghada and Kadaryar give new dimensions to the well-recognised figures of romances.
- King, Mirza Re Sapera and Mard Mard Nahin, Tivin Tivin Nahin are his experiments in absurd drama.
- His anthologies of one-act plays, Parde Pichhon and Chalde Phirde make a good reading.
- His early novels are Ik Shahr Di Gal, Ret Da Pahad and Kandhi Ute Rukhda, but he acquired his special place in this genre with Ik Khali Piala and Kal Vi Suraj Nahin Chadhega. In these works he employed the stream of consciousness and flashback techniques.
