= Balbir Singh Sahitya Kendra =

Library and gallery dedicated to Dr. Balbir Singh

Coordinates: 30.310°N 78.059°E

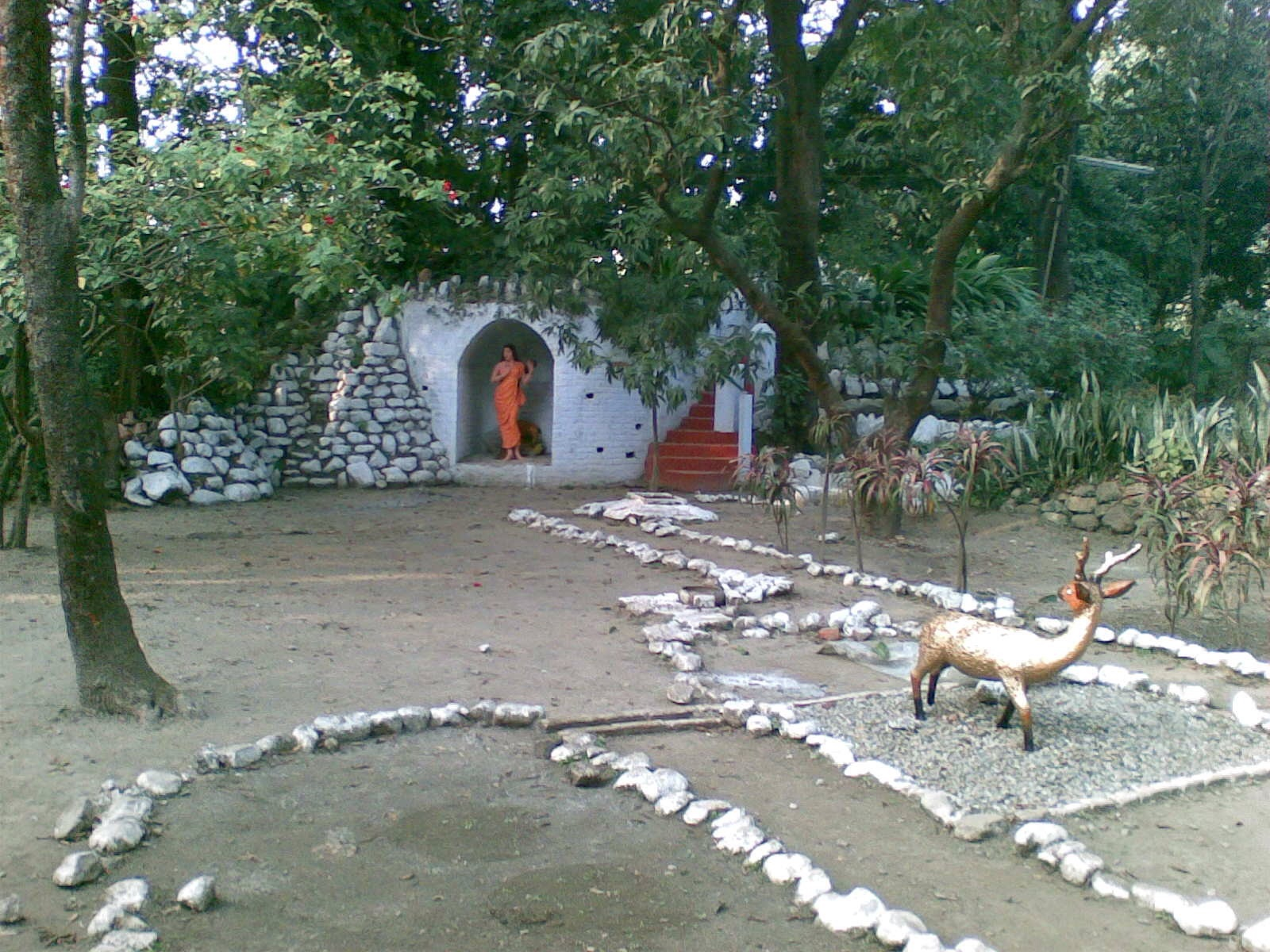
Panchbati Landscape surrounding the memorial

Dr. Balbir Singh Sahitya Kendra is a memorial, library and art gallery in the name of Sikh scholar Dr. Balbir Singh, which is the nucleus of advanced study for research in comparative religion, philosophy & culture. It is now a department of Punjabi University Patiala and located at 20, Pritam road, Dehradun. The place was earlier residence of Balbir Singh. It has facilities for visiting scholars & university researchers to carry out research on comparative religion, Sikh studies and history & culture of Punjab.

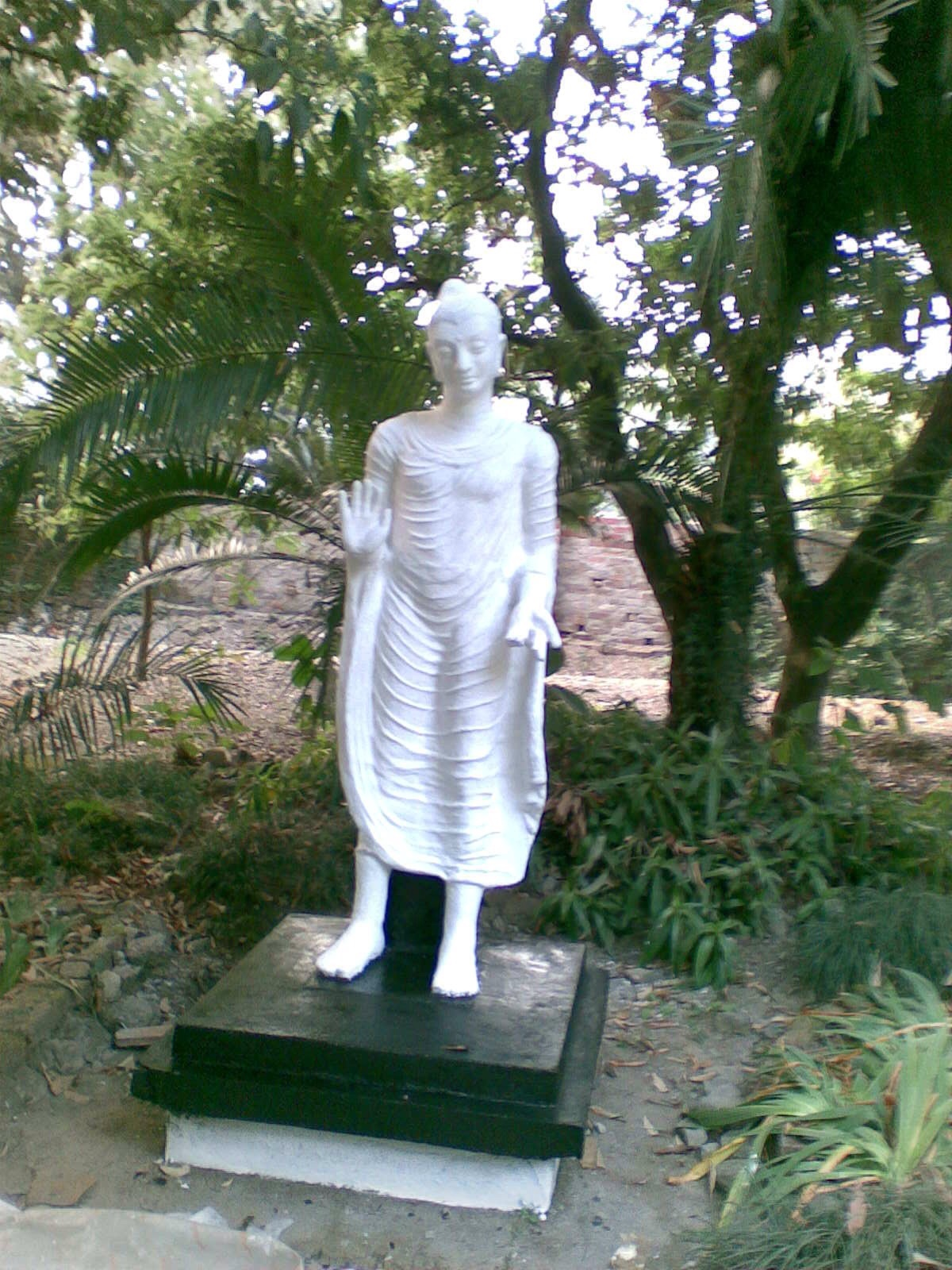
Statue of mahatma Budh at Dr. Balbir Singh Memorial Dehradun

Kendra houses nearly 9,000 volumes, including rare books on Guru Granth Sahib and Sikh studies, history and culture of Punjab and religious traditions of India in English, Gurmukhi, Sanskrit, Prakrit, Hindi, Persian and Urdu, gifted by Dr. Balbir Singh. Whole memorial, Library and Art Gallery is gifted from him to Punjabi University. Prayer room, Lounge, morning room study and rest rooms are being preserved by University as these were existing when Dr. Balbir Singh lived here. Original paintings of well-known artists Abdur Rahman Chughtai, S. G. Thakur Singh, Sobha Singh, Mehr Singh and Dehradun-based Divijen Ben form part of the gallery collection.

Research on an important research project Nirukat an etymological dictionary of Guru Granth Sahib is being carried out from this Kendra.

For the purpose of promotion of Sikh history in Dehradun, the regional centre of the Punjabi University, Balbir Singh Sahitya Kendra, will be converted into the Advanced Centre for Sikh Historical Studies. The centre will also carry out research in the Sikh studies and comparative religion.
