= Baldev Raj Gupta =

Baldev Raj Gupta (also spelled Baladewa Rāja Gupatā; born 8 July 1942, in Chhamal, Sialkot District, British India) is an Indian academic in the field of linguistics, and a Punjabi and Hindi writer.

In addition to his Doctorate in Punjabi linguistics, Gupta has an MA degree in Sanskrit and Punjabi, and a Post Graduate Diploma in French, Tamil and linguistics. He is also fluent in Urdu and Dogri. He has taught at Punjabi University, Annamalai University and Jammu University, where he was the head of the Department of Punjabi. He holds positions on the academic boards and advisory committees of several literary and cultural organisations.

Gupta was recipient of award from Central Hindi Directorate for being the author of best book in Hindi by a non-Hindi writer for his book "Bhasha Vigyan - Bhashiki". Gupta is a Fellow of the Central Institute of Indian Languages.His book “Research in Indian Linguistics” has been widely acclaimed in research and academic circles, including an award by Jagmohan, then Governor of Jammu and Kashmir.

== Publications ==
Gupta has over a dozen books in Punjabi, Hindi and English to his credit and has won awards for three of his books. His publications include:

Punjabi

- Punjabi Shikshan Kala (1972)
- Sheikh Farid Di Bhasha (1976)
- Bhasha vigyan - Punjabi up-Bhasha Vigyan pakhon (1980)
- Bhasha Vigyan Te Punjabi Bhasha Di Bantar (1981)
- Bhasha Vigyan, Bhasha, Lipi te Lok Sahit (1985)
- Rachana Samparan (1993; short stories)
- Jammu Kashmir Vich Prakashit Panjabi Sahit, Bhashagat Chintan (1991)
- Bhasha sahit te sabhyachar (2002)

Hindi

- Bhasha Vigyan - Vibhinn Khshetra (1978)
- Bhasha Vigyan - Bhashiki (1984)

English

- Baladewa Rāja Gupatā (1983). Research in Indian linguistics. New Delhi: Ariana Pub. House. OCLC 10842244.
- Baladewa Rāja Gupatā (1990). Indian linguistics : Punjabi Tamil phonology. New Delhi: Ariana Pub. House. ISBN 978-81-85347-17-2.
- Baladewa Rāja Gupatā (1999). Multilingual issues in J & K's Punjabi literature. Jammu Tawi: Jay Kay Book House. OCLC 49333009.
