= Narinder Singh Kapoor =

Indian writer from Punjab (born 1944)

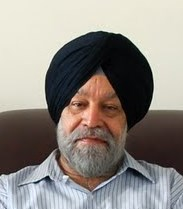
- Born: 6 March 1944 (age 82); Dera Khalsa, Rawalpindi District, British India
- Occupation: Essayist
- Spouse: Ranjit Kaur Chopra

Narinder Singh Kapoor (born 6 March 1944) is an Indian writer from Punjab. His writings are about social, cultural and psychological issues. He lives in Patiala, Punjab.

== Early life ==
Kapoor was born in the village of Dera Khalsa, in Rawalpindi District (formerly in British India, now Pakistan). His family settled in Patiala, after staying at a number of refugee camps after being misplaced in the division of Punjab. He graduated with his M.A. in English from the Punjabi University at Patiala.

He was made Lecturer in English by Punjab Public Service Commission in 1966 and he worked at the Colleges in Nabha, Sangrur and Patiala.

His writings are influenced by his life's experiences, academically and personally. He has been awarded the Shiromani Sahitkaar award for his works.

== Awards ==
- Shiromani Sahitkaar Award by Language Department, Punjab.
- Gurbax Singh Preetlari Prize by Languages Department, Punjab for the book Ahmo Sahmane.

== List of Works ==
=== Collections of essays ===
- Vyakhya Vishleshan/Tarkved (ISBN 8171429238)
- Ahmo Sahmane (ISBN 8171429181)
- Ghaat Ghaat da Paani
- Buhe Barian (ISBN 8171429203)
- Antar Jhaat (ISBN 817142919X)
- Sukhan Sunehe (ISBN 8171429246)
- Dhoongiaan Sikhraan
- Tarakved (ISBN 81-7142-923-8)
- Raah -Raaste
- Giyani Ditt Singh (Jeevan Te Rachna )
- Dar-Darvaaje (ISBN 978-93-5017-207-0)
- SAccho-Sach (America Da SAfarnaama )(ISBN 81-7142-921-1)
- Punjabi Kavita Vich RAshtri Ekta Di Bhavna
- Punjabi Patrkari Da Ithaas

=== Anthologies ===
- Mala Manke (ISBN 8171424074)
- Kaleyan Da Kaflaa (ISBN 978-93-5017-640-5)
- Khidkiyaan (ISBN 978-93-5068-439-9)
- Mala Manke 2

He has been awarded the Shiromani Sahitkaar Award and the Gurbax Singh Preetlari Prize for his book Ahmo Sahmane.

=== Other works ===
- Kandaadhe Chhadh ke Vekhya Amreeka (Travelogue)
- Punjabi Pattarkaari da ithaas (History of Punjabi Journalism)

=== Translations ===
- Pio Puttar (ਪਿਓ ਪੁੱਤਰ, translation in Punjabi of Ivan Turgnev's Fathers and Sons)
- Bharat di khoj (ਭਾਰਤ ਦੀ ਖੋਜ, translation in Punjabi of Jawaharlal Nehru's The Discovery of India)
