= Bhura Singh Ghuman =

Indian academic and academic administrator

Bhura Singh Ghuman (born 1954) is an Indian academic and academic administrator who served as Vice-Chancellor of Punjabi University, Patiala since 14 August 2017. He resigned from post of VC on 18 November 2020.

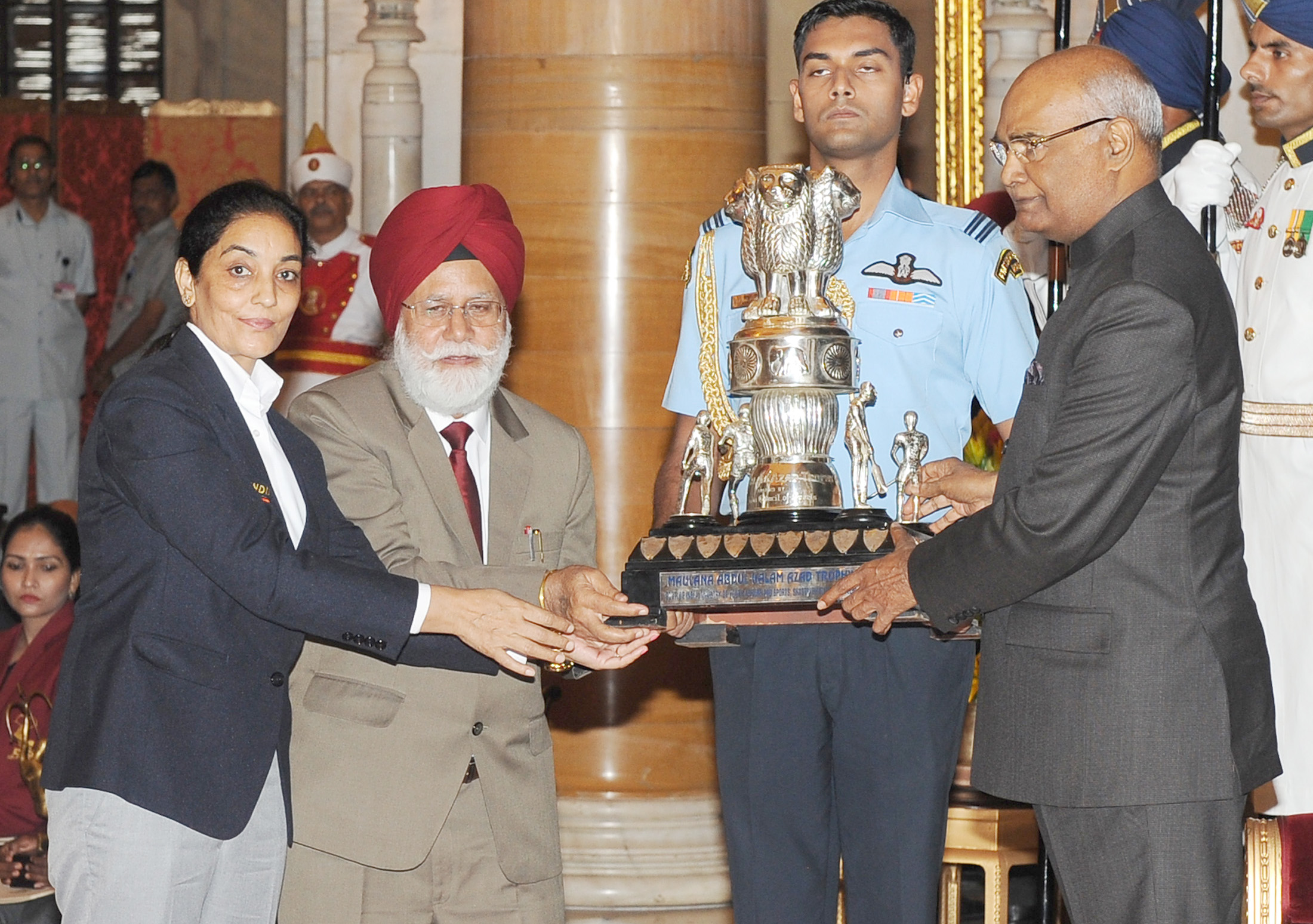
Dr. Ghuman (red turban) receiving MAKA trophy from President of India for 2016-17 awarded to Punjabi University

== Early life and education ==
Bhura Singh Ghuman was born on 15 June 1954 at village Arkwas, (near Lehragaga) and did his early schooling at the local village school. He did his graduation from Shaheed Udham Singh Government College, Sunam and M.A. in Public administration from Punjabi University, Patiala. He completed his M.Phil. and Ph.D. from GNDU in year 1979 and 1985 respectively.

== Work ==
Ghuman held several notable academic positions, he served as a Professor of Public Administration at Panjab University, Chandigarh for thirty eight years. Ghuman is editor of many renowned research journals and published 73 papers and 3 books. He was also a member of academic bodies of various universities. Besides this, he was also a member of fifth Pay Commission, Punjab from 2007 to 2009 and Punjab Governance Reforms Commission.

== Awards & honors ==
He received the Paul H. Appleby award for contribution in the field of public administration. He is also recipient of many other awards.

== Stint at Punjabi University ==
Professor Ghuman has an interest in overall development of university and carried out various initiatives including improving research standards, starting the new academic programmes and specialized centres, MoU signing with foreign universities, securing increased grants from Punjab government and MHRD besides removing wasteful expenditure. He has taken many initiatives to improve the university. the university has been showing improvements under his leadership.

Prof. Ghuman has been given an extension of three years due to his excellent work and efficient handling of university affairs by Chancellor and Governor of Punjab.
