= Guru Gobind Singh Bhawan =

Guru Gobind Singh Bhawan is an iconic landmark building located at Punjabi University, Patiala, India. The foundation stone of the landmark was laid down by the then President of India, Zakir Hussain on 27 December 1967. The foundation was laid during the 300th birth anniversary celebrations of 10th Sikh Guru Guru Gobind Singh.
