= Dera Khalsa =

- Location within Pakistan
- Coordinates: 33.31°N 73.26°E
- Country: Pakistan
- Province: Punjab
- Elevation: 700 m (2,300 ft)
- Time zone: UTC+5 (PST)

Dera Khalsa is a village in the Kallar Syedan Tehsil, Rawalpindi District, Punjab province of Pakistan. The name was given by rulers of this region during Sikh rule in Punjab. This name is still used to refer this village. Presently the entire population of this village is Muslim, having strong religious beliefs and 95% of existing families are migrated from nearby areas in 1947. Presently residing families settled in this village in 1951–52. The principal clans of the village are the Malik Awans, Kayani Ghakars, and the Janjua Rajpoots.

== History ==
This is a village which was built and founded by the Sikhs in the 1830s or 1840s during the rule of the Sikh Empire in the northern Indian sub-continent and during Sikh rule in Punjab in the mid-19th century it was a kind of religious center of Sikhism. In 1855 this village was entirely a Sikh village and in the later days of the Sikh Empire rule in the Punjab, this village was the headquarters of Sikh Sardars who were personally appointed by the Maharaja. There was a Sikh Gurdwara Dharam-shala where all strangers and preachers could come and stay and enlighten the village people who would gather every morning and evening to listen to the holy chanting of the Great Gurus’ hymns of Sikh religion. In the early 1850s and 1860s, the dominant personality of this village were sons of the Malik Sardar family. Even after termination of Sikh rule in Punjab, members of this family remained prominent personalities of this village till 1930.

This village was attacked by an epidemic disease Plague in 1906 which killed many of the local villagers, almost all the survivor left this village and scattered at great distances all over the country.

The saint Attar Singh a famous Sikh preacher visited Dera Khalsa in the early 20th century for propagation of Guru message. Saint Attar Singh who almost remained away from his family during his religious activities, Dera Khalsa is a place where mother of saint Attar Singh met him after a long time.

Professor Puran Singh was a famous Sikh poet and scientist of Sub continent in the early 20th century. He was born at Salhad, Abbottabad on 17 February 1881 when his father Kartar Singh was posted there during his service in the military. Puran Singh belonged to an Ahluwalia Kalal family of Dera Khalsa, therefore, his ancestral home was in the village of Dera Khalsa.

Another Sikh leader Master Tara Singh and Bhai Guru Singh administered Amrit (religious oath) from Sant Attar Singh at Dera Khalsa. Tara Singh was also a famous leader of Sikhs during 1947. He is remembered for two things one steering Sikhs towards opting for India in 1947 and second campaigning for the state of Punjab in Independent India. Tara Singh vigorously campaigned against the demand of Pakistan. Tara Singh, during his middle education at Rawalpindi, would sometimes while coming home (Harial Rawalpindi) on some holidays he along with several others would go and have darshan of Saint Attar Singh at Dera Khalsa. During the violence in 1947, the Sikhs opted for India and left Dera Khalsa on 8 March 1947. This was the last day of the Sikhs at Dera Khalsa. The village is now entirely Muslim and many families in the village today migrated to Dera Khalsa from surrounding nearby areas in 1947. 95% of families currently living in Dera Khalsa settled in 1947–1948.
