= Kirpal Singh Narang =

Indian historian and educationist (1912–2019)

- Born: 12 April 1912; Amritsar, Punjab, India
- Died: 5 July 2019; Chandigarh
- Awards: Padma Bhushan

Kirpal Singh Narang was an Indian historian, educationist and the vice-chancellor of Punjabi University. He was the second in line of the vice-chancellors of the university (1966–75) and the longest serving among them. Born on 12 April 1912 in Amritsar in Punjab of the British India, he published several books on the history of Punjab and Sikhs, which included four volumes of Punjab history and a book on Islam. The Government of India awarded him the third highest civilian honour of the Padma Bhushan, in 1975, for his contributions to education and literature.

== Selected bibliography ==
- Kirpal Singh Narang (1953). History of the Punjab, 1526-1849. Uttar Chand Kapur. p. 496. ASIN B0007K4EVY.
- History of the Punjab: 1500 -1558, by K.S. Narang and M.R. Gupta, Rev & enl ed.
- Kirpal Singh Narang; Hari Ram Gupta (1967). History of the Punjab, 1526-1857. Uttar Chand Kapur.
- Kirpal Singh Narang; Hari Ram Gupta (1969). History of the Punjab, 1500-1858. U.C. Kapur.
- Kirpal Singh Narang (1969). Islam. Punjabi University. p. 115. OCLC 930597970.

== See also ==
- Punjabi University
