= Balraj Pandit =

Hindi and Punjabi playwright

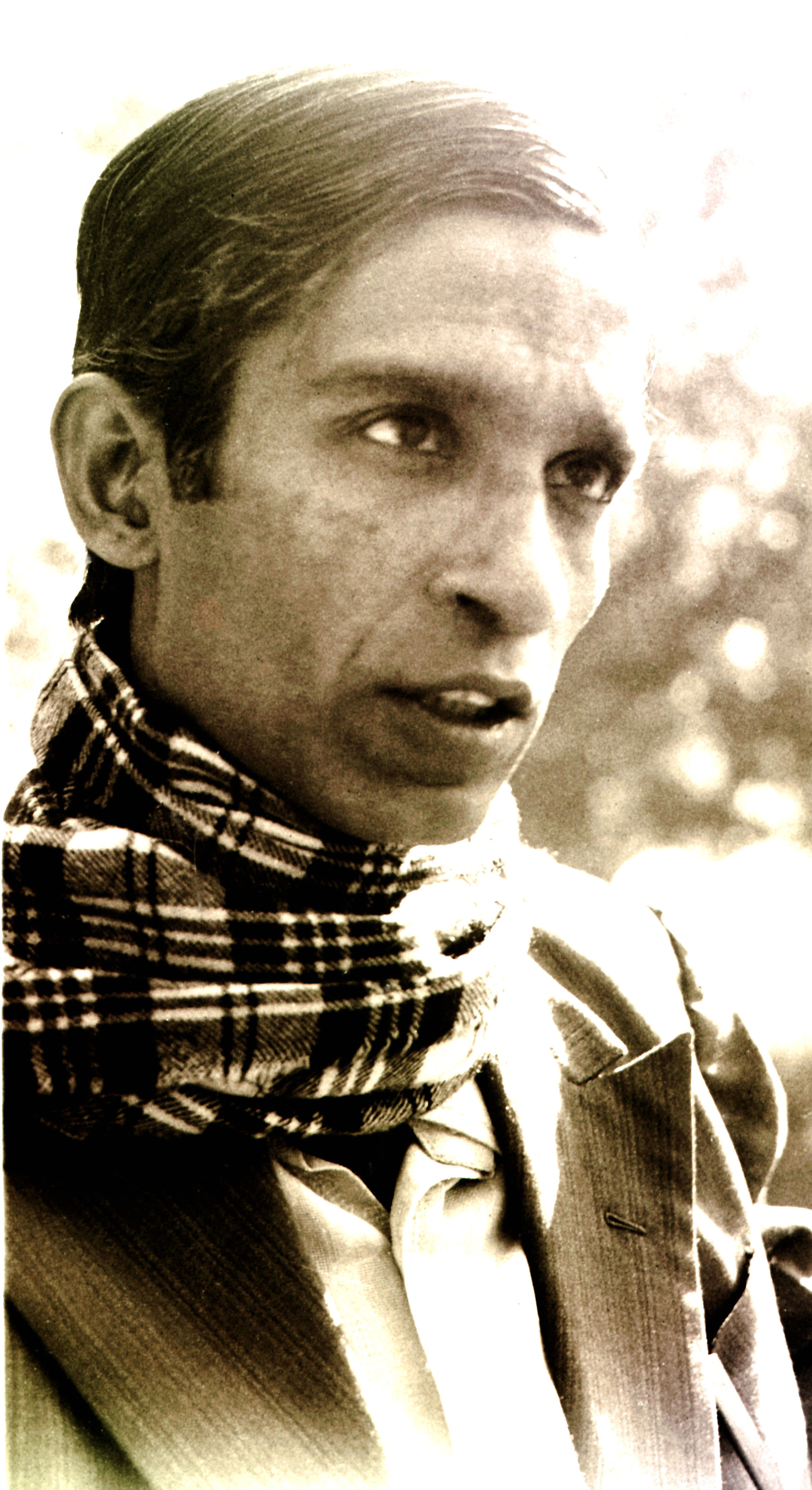
Balraj Pandit in 1975

Balraj Pandit (d. October 13, 2006) was a well-known Hindi and Punjabi playwright besides being a theatre director, poet, painter and a popular teacher. His Paanchwan Sawaar (पांचवा सवार) is considered a classic and a significant play of Indian dramaturgy. The play has been staged many times by different theatre troupes with actors like Naseeruddin Shah, Om Puri and Manohar Singh among other playing roles. Lok Udaasi (ਲੋਕ ਉਦਾਸੀ) in Punjabi was another of his well-known plays besides Biwiyon Ka Madrasa an adaptation of Molière's L'École des Femmes (The School for Wives).

Panditji, as he was fondly called, graduated from National School of Drama, New Delhi in 1969. He studied theatre under such stalwarts as Ebrahim Alkazi and then after a short stint of teaching in NSD he joined Theatre and Television Department at Punjabi University in Patiala. He taught generations of students there till his retirement.

He lived at Patiala in Punjab until he died on 13 October 2006.

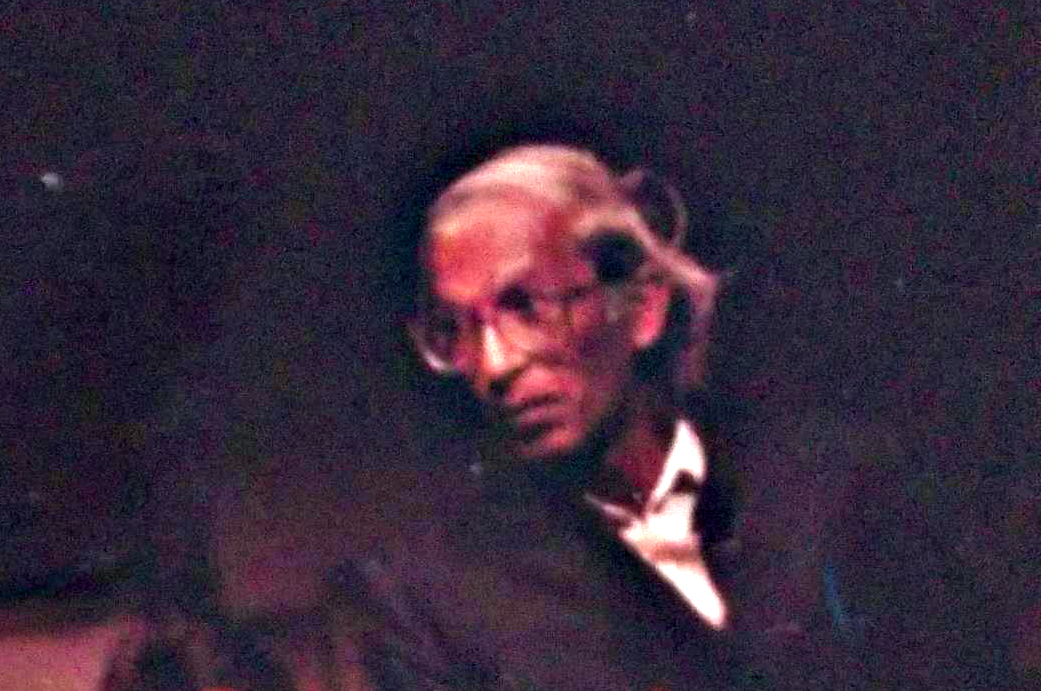
Balraj Pandit

== Plays ==
- Paanchwan Sawaar -The play talks about how a middle-class young man turns into the neglected ‘Paanchwan Sawaar’ hopeful of rising and making it big in life. The play was originally written and directed by the famous playwright Balraj Pandit.
- Biwiyon Ka Madarsa, adaptation of Molière's The School for Wives - A Hindi version of Molière's 17th century classical farce 'The School for Wives' by Balraj Pandit.
- Lok Udaasi - The play is one of the most historic Punjabi productions written and directed by Balraj Pandit.
- Adaptation of Premchand's story Kaffan
- Adaptation in Hindi of Evam Indrajit, a play about the mediocre class. The play subtly points towards Satrean Existentialism and denotes that life is a circle with no ending, it ends where it begins, it is an endless road.
- Translation of Uma Anand's Aao Naatak Khelen by Balraj Pandit
