= Balbir Singh (scholar) =

Panth Ratan Balbir Singh
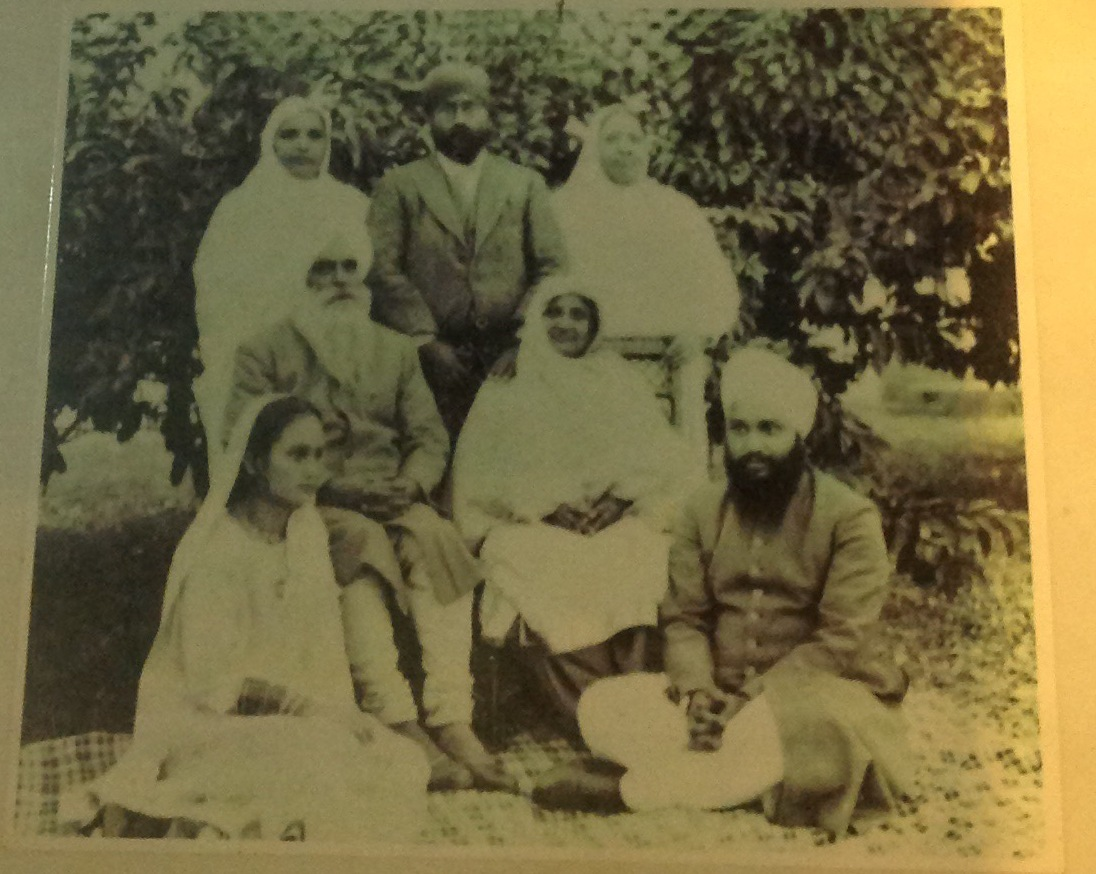
- Bhai Vir Singh with his spouse and his brother Dr Balbir Singh standing at back
- Born: 13 December 1896; Amritsar, Punjab, India
- Died: 1 October 1974 (aged 77)
- Education: Ph.D. (Chemistry)
- Alma mater: University of London (Doctoral studies)
- Occupation: Scholar
- Relatives: Bhai Vir Singh (brother)
- Writing career
- Language: Punjabi
- Subject: Sikh philosophy
- Notable works: Nirukata Sri Guru Granth Sahib, Lambi Nadar

Balbir Singh (13 December 1896 – 1 October 1974) was an Indian Sikh scholar and brother of Bhai Vir Singh. He worked at the Punjab & Sind Bank and published literary works.

== Early life and education ==
Balbir was born in 1896 at Katra Garba Singh, Amritsar. His father Dr Charan Singh expired at his early age of 12. He was brought up by his elder brother Vir Singh whom he called as his father. After his primary education in Amritsar he studied M.Sc. from Govt. College Lahore. He went to England and obtained his Ph.D. degree in chemistry from the University of London. In 1923 he returned to India.

== Works ==
After coming back Singh did not join the government service as was arranged for him. He took up his first assignment as Principal of Cambridge Preparatory School at Dehradun in 1925, which he continued to serve till 1935. He joined as Director of Punjab & Sind Bank in 1937. He was promoted to Managing Director in 1947, which post he continued to hold till 1960.

== Literary works ==
Singh had a lot of literary interests and wanted always to help his brother in his works. He started writing a history of Singh Sabha Movement and published Charan Hari Visthar, a life history of his family and father in two volumes. He also helped his brother Bhai Vir Singh in the compilation of Guru Granth Kosh. He was a scholar and author of many books on Sikh religious philosophy in Punjabi and English. He owned a large collection of rare books, numbering about 1000, at his residence in Dehradun known as Panchbati, which has been converted into a memorial library and art gallery in his name. Some of his important published works are:

1. Charan Hari Visthar 2 Volumes
2. Kalam dee Karamat
3. Lambi Nadar
4. Shudh Saroop
5. Ragmala da Swal
6. Kavi Jodh
7. Kavi Aalam (English)
8. Message of Guru Gobind Singh and other Essays
9. Nirukat Sri Guru Granth Sahib

== Nirukta Sri Guru Granth Sahib ==
It is an encyclopaedic dictionary of Guru Granth Sahib. This was an important project started by him. He published the first volume in his lifetime and continue his work for the second volume till his death on 1 October 1974, when he had already given the second volume to press after final editing. Further Punjabi University Patiala has published four more volumes as per guidelines established by him. A quarterly literary magazine Panchbati Sandesh was also started by him, which has been continued by her daughter Mohinder Kaur and subsequently by Punjabi University Patiala.Balbir Singh Sahitya Kendra a memorial library and art gallery has been established at the residence of Singh in Dehradun which has been donated to Punjabi University Patiala. The work of publishing remaining volumes on Nirukat has been entrusted to this library.
