= Gulzar Singh Sandhu =

Punjabi writer

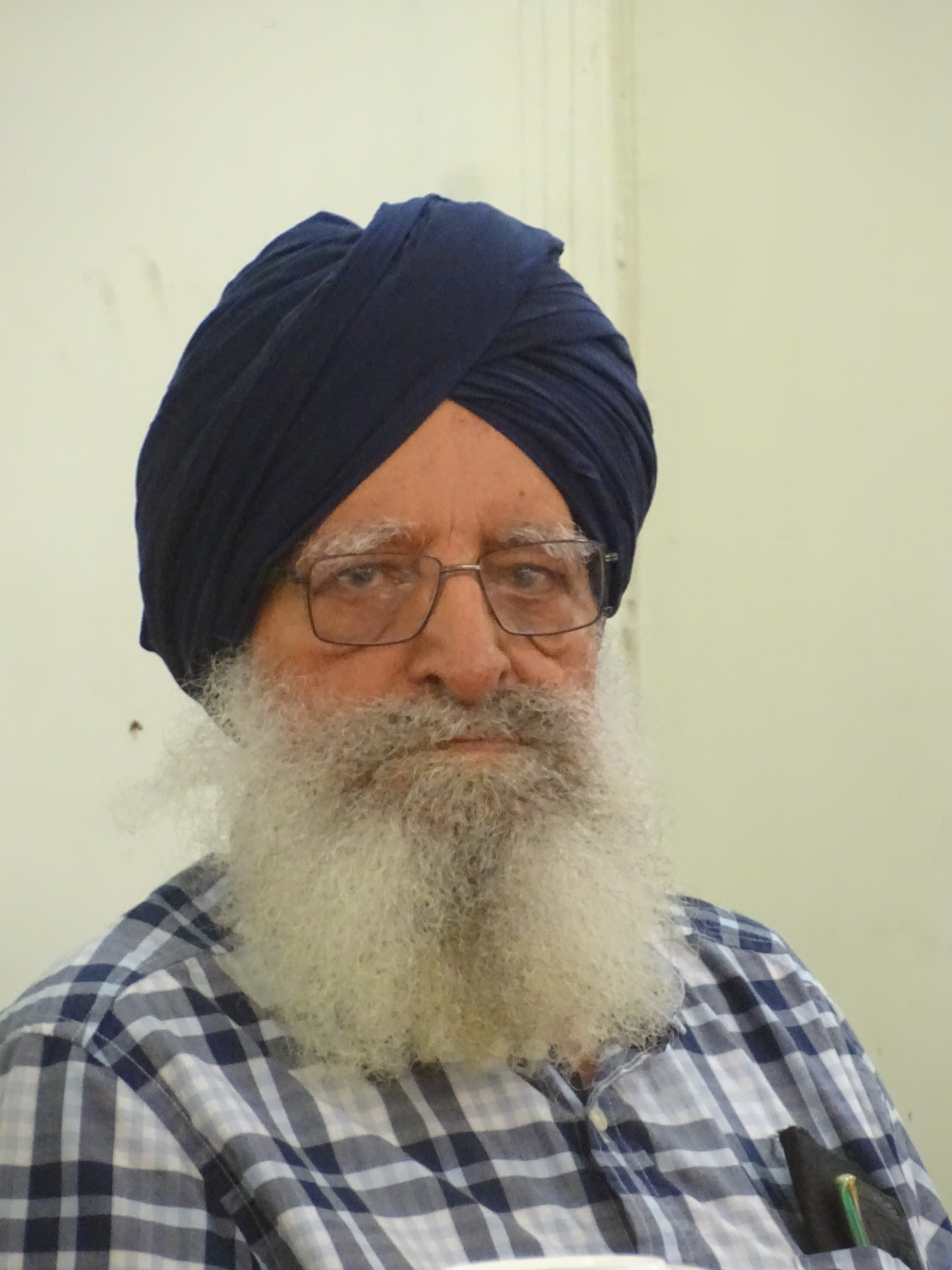
Gulzar Singh Sandhu

Gulzar Singh Sandhu (born 27 February 1935) is a prominent Punjabi language writer. He won the prestigious Sahitya Akademi Award, given by the Sahitya Akademi, India's National Academy of Letters, for his short story collection, Amar Katha in 1982. Among other awards he was also the recipient of International Association of Authors, Playwrights and Artists of Canada in 1992 and Shiromani Punjabi Sahityakar Puraskar from the Education Department of Punjab in 2001.

== Early life and education ==
He was born on 27 February 1935 in the village of Kotla Badla in Samrala division of Ludhiana district. He has a master's degree and Gyani in Punjabi literature. He was married to Dr. Surjeet Kaur Pannu on 11 March 1966.

== Career ==
He has held various senior posts with the Indian government, Punjab Agricultural University and Indian Red Cross. He taught in Punjabi University as a professor of Journalism and Mass communication. He was also the chief editor of prominent newspapers and the founding editor of The Punjabi Tribune published from Chandigarh. Due to his remarkable contribution to Punjabi literature has been honored with appointments to several educational and literary institutions such as Punjabi writer's academy, Punjabi literary academy and Punjab arts council.

His columns are published regularly in noted Punjabi magazines and newspapers in India and abroad.

== Personal life ==
He is married to Surjit Kaur Sandhu. He lives in Chandigarh, India with his wife.

== Sources ==
- Publication Bureau Punjabi University Patiala
- www.sahitya-akademi.gov.in
