= Sardara Singh Johl =

Indian economist

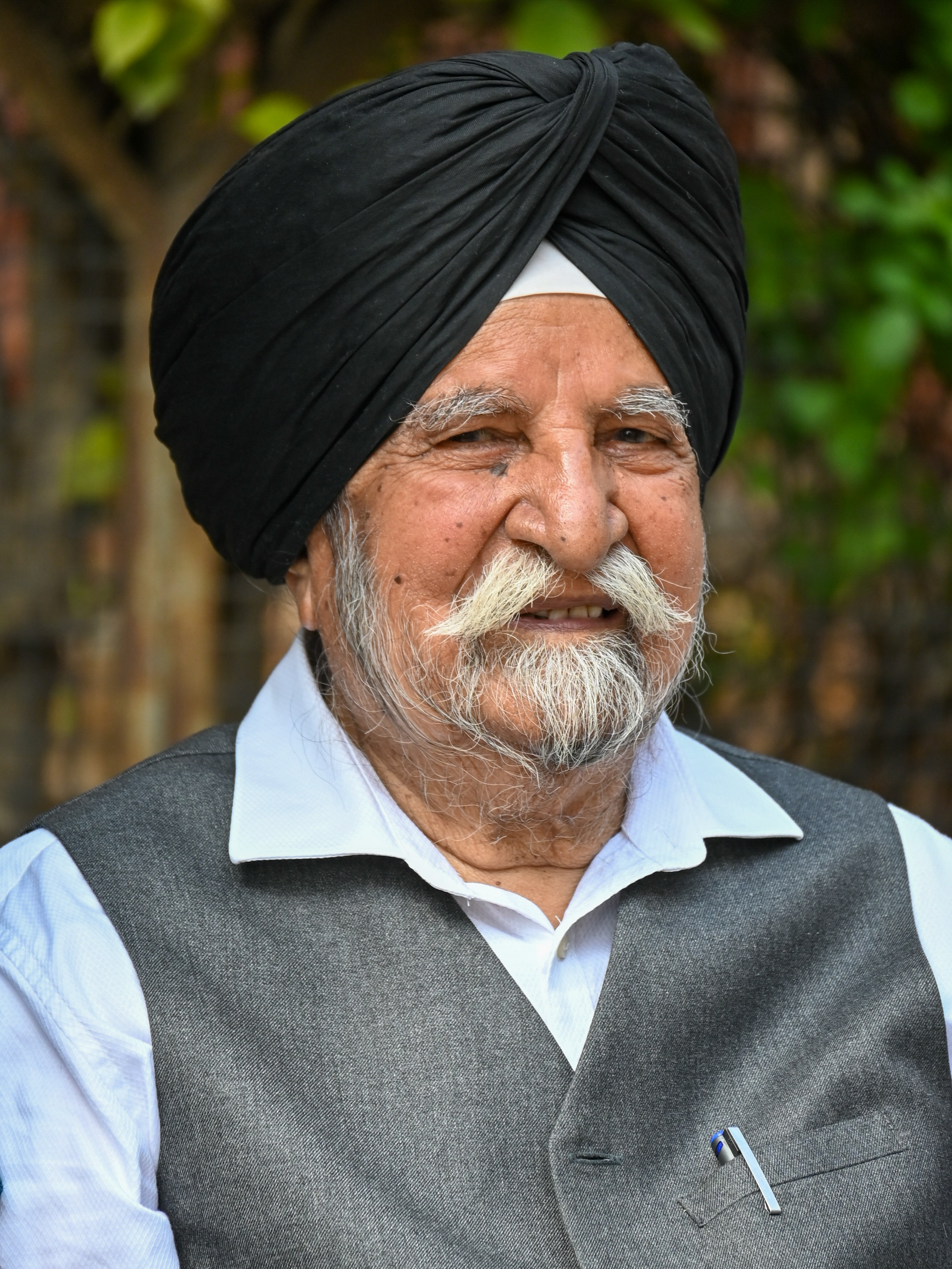
- Johl in 2024
- Born: 2 August 1928 (age 98); Lyalpur, British India
- Occupations: Agriculture economist Academic; Writer
- Years active: Since 1952
- Known for: Agriculture economics
- Awards: Chief Khalsa Diwan Centenary Award; Mahan Punjabi Award; Padma Bhushan; PAU Golden Jubilee Outstanding Alumni Award; Dr. Madan Gold Medal Award

Sardara Singh Johl (born 2 August 1928) is an Indian agriculture economist, writer, politician and the chancellor of the Central University of Punjab. A former National Professor of Agricultural Economics of the Indian Council of Agricultural Research, he served as the vice chancellor of the Punjabi University and Punjab Agricultural University during different tenures and chaired the Commission for Agricultural Costs and Prices set up by the Government of India. He is a former director of the Central Board of Governors of the Reserve Bank of India and a former consultant to international bodies such as Food and Agriculture Organization, World Bank and United Nations Economic and Social Commission for Western Asia. The Government of India awarded him the third highest civilian honour of the Padma Bhushan, in 2004, for his contributions to Agriculture and agriculture education.

== Biography ==
Sardara Singh Johl was born in a farmers' family on 8 February 1928 in Lyalpur (present-day Faisalabad in Pakistan) in the British India to S. Boota Singh and did his early schooling at the local village school. After securing his graduate (BSc) and post graduate degrees (MSc) in agriculture and agriculture economics respectively from Punjab University, he continued his studies to obtain a master's degree (MA) in economics and, later, a doctoral degree (PhD) from Punjabi University in 1952. He started his career the same year in agriculture and rural development in the hilly regions of Punjab where he worked for eight years before joining Punjab Agricultural University as an assistant professor and rose to the position of a professor and the Head of the Department of Economics and Sociology in 1965.

Johl held several notable academic positions; he held the vice-chancellorship of Punjabi University, Punjab Agricultural University and Haryana Agricultural University before being appointed as the chancellor of the Central University of Punjab in 2012, thus becoming the first chancellor of the university. He has chaired the Commission for Agricultural Costs and Prices and sat in the Central Board of Governors of the Reserve Bank of India. He has been the vice-chairman of the Punjab State Planning Board and a visiting professor at Ohio State University and London School of Economics. It was during his stint as the head of the Advisory Committee on Agriculture Policy of the Government of Punjab, he proposed the crop rotation and diversification for the wheat and rice farmers of the state, by introducing subsidies to the farming community for switching to other crops, popularly known as the Johl Plan. He served as a member of the Economic Advisory Council during the tenancy of four different Union Governments, Punjab Government and as a consultant to Tamil Nadu Government, Gujrat Government, Sri Lankan Government, Food and Agriculture Organization, World Bank and the United Nations Economic and Social Commission for Western Asia. He is a fellow of International Society of Economists, former president of the Indian Society of Agricultural Economics, Agricultural Economics Research Association, Indian Society for Agricultural Marketing and Punjab Sahit Akademi. Known to be vocal in socio-political comments,

When International Agricultural Economics Association held its annual conference in Minsk in the erstwhile USSR (presently the capital city of Belarus) in 1970, Johl chaired three of its sessions. He has prepared several government reports, such as Rationalisation of Electricity Tariff in Punjab, Diversification of Agriculture in Punjab, Structural Adjustments in Cropping Patterns for Growth and Productivity in Punjab and Structural Reforms in Agricultural Sector for Productivity and Growth in India, which are reported to have helped in government policy formulations. Besides, he has published over 200 articles in national and international journals. He has also documented his own life in an autobiography, Ranga di Gagar, written in Punjabi language, which has since been translated into Hindi and Urdu languages.

== Awards and honors ==
Johl is an elected fellow of the Punjab Academy of Sciences and the National Academy of Agricultural Sciences. The Government of India awarded him the civilian honor of the Padma Bhushan in 2004 and Punjab University conferred the degree of DLitt (honoris causa) on him in 2005. He also received honorary doctorates from Punjabi University and Guru Nanak Dev University, Amritsar. The Indian Council of Agricultural Research (ICAR) appointed him as the National Professor of Eminence and Punjab Sahit Akademi inducted him as a life member. He is also a recipient of Chief Khalsa Diwan Centenary Award, Punjab Agricultural University Golden Jubilee Outstanding Alumni Award, Mahan Punjabi Award of the Professor Mohan Singh Foundation and Dr. Madan Gold Medal Award.
