= Punjabi University =

Higher education institute in India

- Motto: ਵਿਦਿਆ ਵੀਚਾਰੀ ਤਾਂ ਪਰਉਪਕਾਰੀ
- Motto in English: Education Empowers
- Type: Public State University
- Established: April 30, 1962; 64 years ago
- Affiliations: UGC, NAAC, AIU
- Chancellor: Governor of Punjab
- Vice-Chancellor: Jagdeep Singh
- Location: Patiala, Punjab, 147002, India; 30.36°N 76.45°E
- Campus: Urban
- Language: Punjabi, English
- Nickname: PUP
- Website: www.punjabiuniversity.ac.in

Location in Punjab, India

Punjabi University is a collegiate state public university located in Patiala, Punjab, India. It was established on 30 April 1962 and is only the second university in the world to be named after a language, after Hebrew University of Israel. Originally, it was conceived as a unitary multi-faculty teaching and research university, primarily meant for the development and enrichment of the Punjabi language and culture, but alive to the social and education requirements of the state.

== History ==
Punjabi University was established on 30 April 1962 under the Punjab Act of 1961 as a residential and teaching university, not as an affiliating university. It started functioning from temporary accommodation in Baradari Palace building. Initially its jurisdictional area was fixed as the 10-mile (16 km) radius. There were only nine colleges – six professional and three art and science colleges in Patiala — which fell within its jurisdiction. The university moved to its present campus in 1965. The campus is spread over about 316 acres (1.28 km^{2}). The Patiala campus offers international-standard facilities for students and researchers.

Although initially, the main task before the university was to develop and promote the language of the Punjabi people, it has since evolved into a multi-faculty educational institution. It grew into an affiliating university in 1969, with 43 colleges affiliated to it and covering Patiala, Sangrur and Bathinda districts of Punjab. Since then, it developed significantly and acquired a distinctive character among the centres of education and research in the country. Now, it has more than 278 affiliated colleges spread over nine districts of Punjab. The affiliated colleges are in districts of Patiala, Barnala, Fatehgarh Sahib, Sangrur, Bathinda, Malerkotla district, Mansa, Mohali, Rupnagar and Faridkot.

== Campus ==
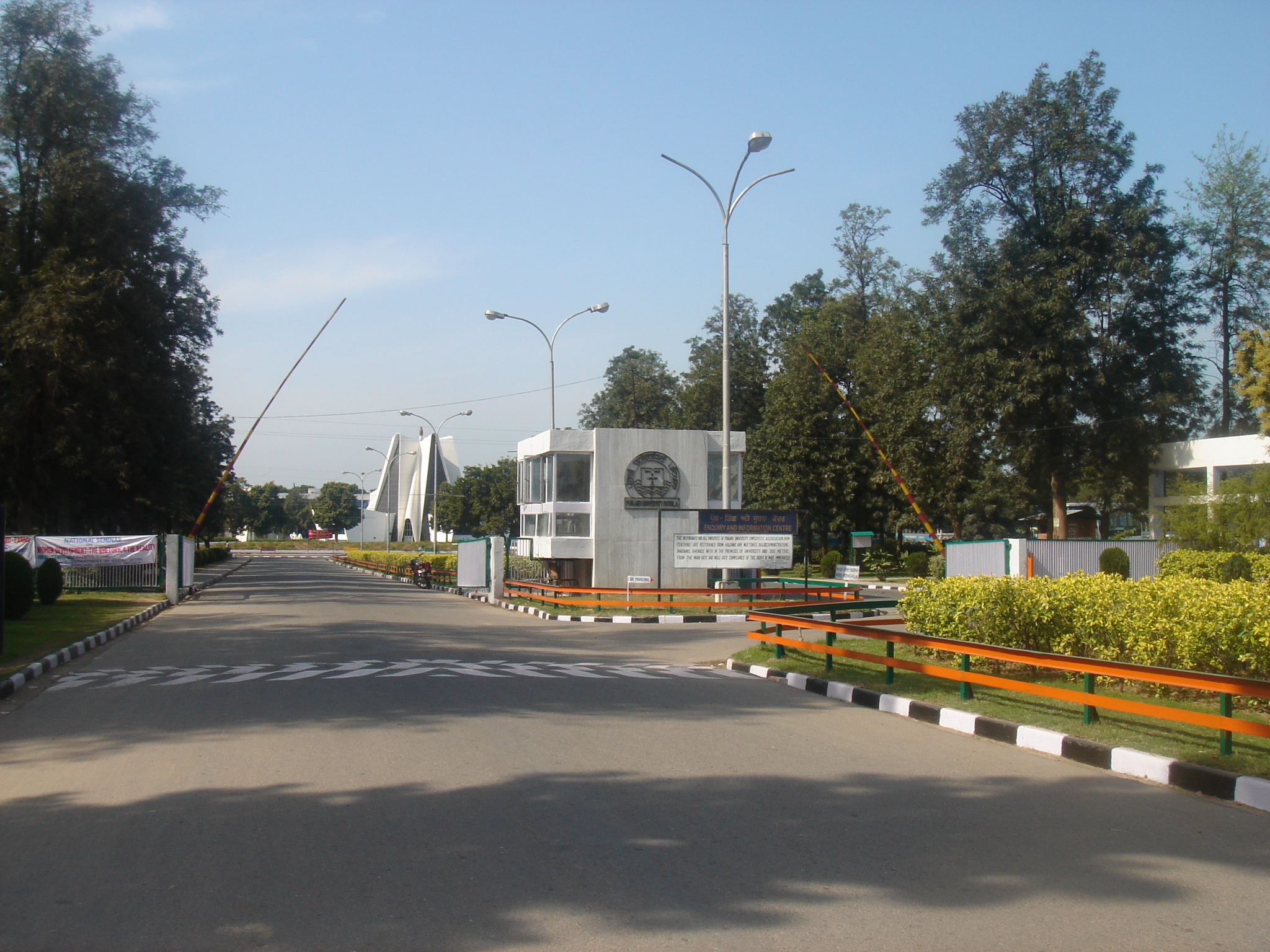
Main gate of Punjabi University

The university campus is spread over an area of over 600 acres (2.4 km^{2}), on the Patiala-Chandigarh road, about 7 kilometres from Patiala. The university has more than 70 teaching and research departments, covering disciplines in Humanities, Science, Engineering, Pharmacy, Law, Fine Arts, Computer Science and Business Management. University also conducts various degree, diploma and certificate courses through distance learning. University not only caters to students from northern region of India, but students from African countries also take admission here.

The campus features various amenities, including a State Bank of India branch, a Post office, the Science and Arts Auditorium, an open-air theatre, guest and faculty houses, seminar complexes, a faculty club, a botanical garden and several spacious lawns, It also houses a model school and maintains a fleet of buses for transportation of students and staff.

The university has undertaken the responsibility of maintaining the estate of Norah Richards at Andretta, Himachal Pradesh. Arrangements have been made for faculty members and students who wish to carry out study and research in the fields of theatre and television. The university manages Balbir Singh Sahitya Kendra at Dehradun, the capital city of the Uttarakhand. There is a rich library with rare books and manuscripts bequeathed by Bhai Vir Singh, Balbir Singh and Prof Puran Singh, the doyens of Punjabi literature. Research on comparative religions is carried out at this center.

=== Regional centres and neighborhood campuses ===
The university has four regional centres: the Guru Kashi Regional Center at Bathinda, Guru Kashi Campus at Talwandi Sabo, Regional Centre for Information Technology and Management at Mohali, Nawab Sher Mohammad Khan Institute of Advanced Studies in Urdu, Persian and Arabic at Malerkotla. Punjabi University also maintains seven neighborhood campuses at Rampura Phul, Jhunir, Sardulgarh, Ralla, Maur, Jaito and Dehla Seehan.

=== Constituent colleges ===
The university has also established 13 constituent colleges at Mansa, Rampura Phul, Sardulgarh, Ghudda, Bahadurpur (Mansa), Barnala, Benra (Dhuri), Chuni Kalan, Dhilwan, Ghanaur, Jaito, Meera Pur and Moonak.

=== Landmarks ===
- Guru Gobind Singh Bhawan
- Bhai Kahn Singh Nabha Central Library
- Guru Teg Bahadur Hall
- Charlotte Aujla Auditorium, Kala Bhawan
- Gol Market
- Art Gallery
- Yadavindra College of Engineering

== Organization and administration ==
List of vice-chancellors
- Jodh Singh, 1962–1966
- Kirpal Singh Narang, 1966–1975
- Inderjit Kaur Sandhu, 1975–1977
- Amrik Singh, 1977–1980
- Bhagat Singh Shergill, 1980–1983
- Sardara Singh Johl, 1983–1986
- Bhagat Singh Shergill, 1986–1989
- H. K. Manmohan Singh, 1989–1993
- Joginder Singh Puar, 1993–1999
- Jasbir Singh Ahluwalia, 1999–2002
- Swarn Singh Boparai, 2002–2007
- Jaspal Singh, 2007–2017
- B.S.Ghuman, 2017 to 2020
- Dr. Arvind, 2021 t

The governance of the university is conducted through the Syndicate, which is the highest decision-making body of the university. The Syndicate approves matters pertaining to the administration of the university as well as academics, once the academic council has passed the matter. The vice-chancellor is chairman of the syndicate. The governor of Punjab is chancellor of the university and titular head of the university. The Senate and academic Council are other advisory and decision-making bodies of the university. All these bodies of the university were established under the Punjab Act no. 35 of 1961.

The teacher's elected body is Punjabi University Teacher Association (PUTA) and other staff is represented through employees association. The elections to both these association has been conducted annually.

== Academics ==
Punjabi University is a large, primarily residential and affiliating university. University follows a semester system with Autumn semester usually starting in late July and Spring semester ending in early May. Academics at University is organized into eleven faculties and departments under various faculties.

=== Teaching and learning ===
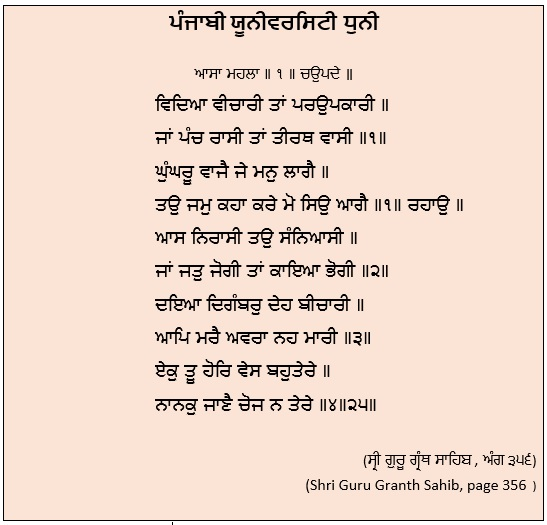
University Dhuni (Anthem)

The prominent university departments are:

- University College of Engineering (CSE/ECE/ME/CE)
- Department of Computer Science
- Punjabi Department
- Linguistics Department
- School of Management Studies
- Economics
- Mathematics
- Department of Physiotherapy
- Department of Biotechnology
- Department of Pharmaceutical Sciences & Drug Research
- S.Daljit Singh Sethi Physics Department
- Department of Education and Community services
- Department of Botany

=== Research centers and institutes ===
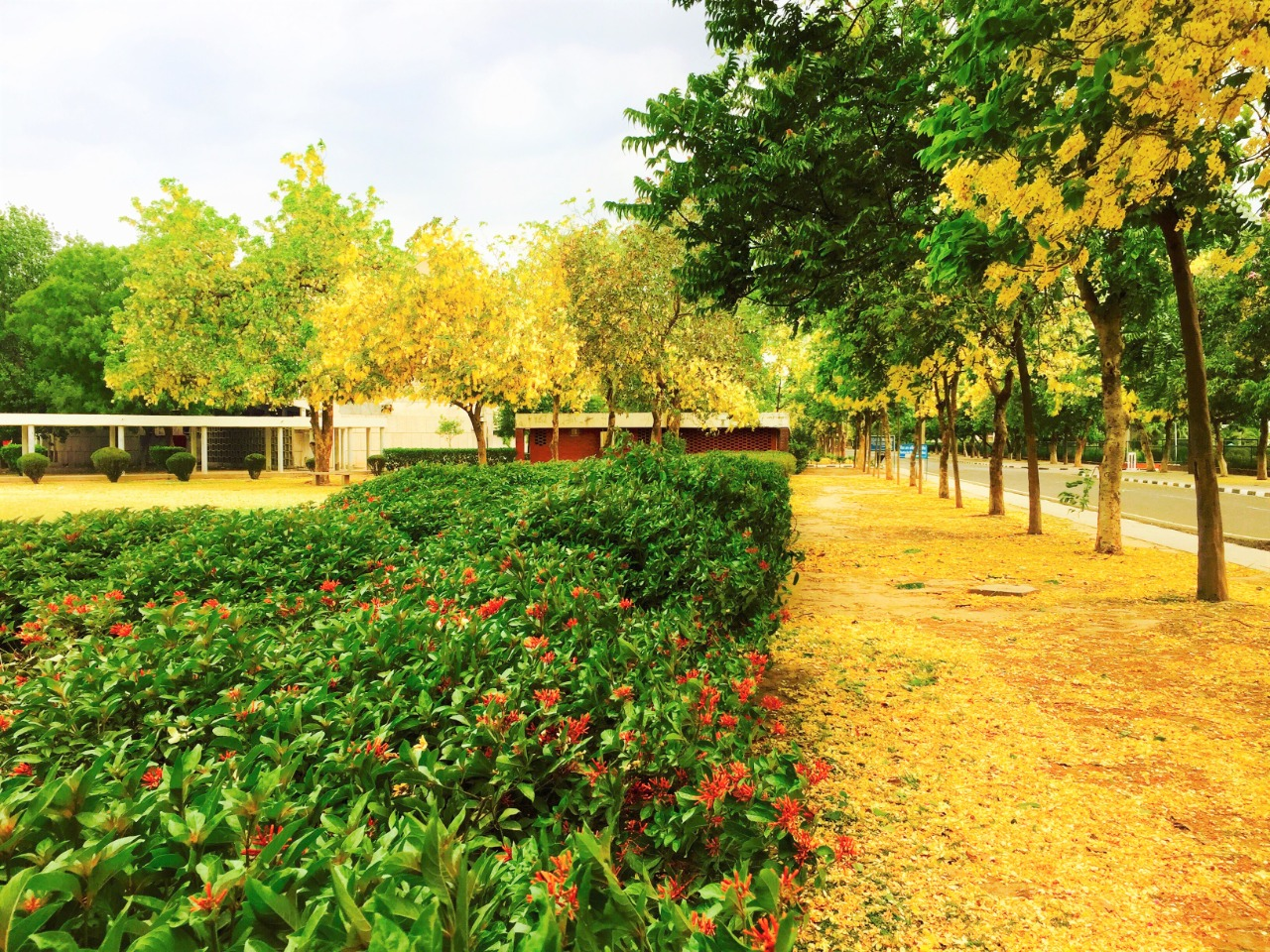
Ornamental gardens on campus

University has established various research departments and chairs to conduct research work in various fields of study.

- Centre for Development Economics and Innovation Studies
- Research Centre for Punjabi Language Technology
- Sri Guru Granth Sahib Studies
- Department of Development of Punjabi Language
- Gurmat Sangeet Chair

=== Faculty and research ===
All the departments are involved to promote research culture and spirit. Most of the departments have been able to mobilize additional research funding from UGC, DST, CSIR, Planning Commission, government departments and other official funding agencies. Many of science departments have been able to develop research tie-ups with industry and have undertaken several consultancy assignments.

To ensure academic freedom, the departments organize seminars, symposia, conferences and workshops every year. The teachers are encouraged to participate in national and international seminars through liberal funding. Many teachers are invited to deliver plenary lectures and preside over the sessions at seminars and conferences.

=== Admissions ===
Admissions to various departments are conducted through centralized admission cell. University conducts many kinds of certificate, diploma, degree and PhD courses in various subjects.

=== University library ===
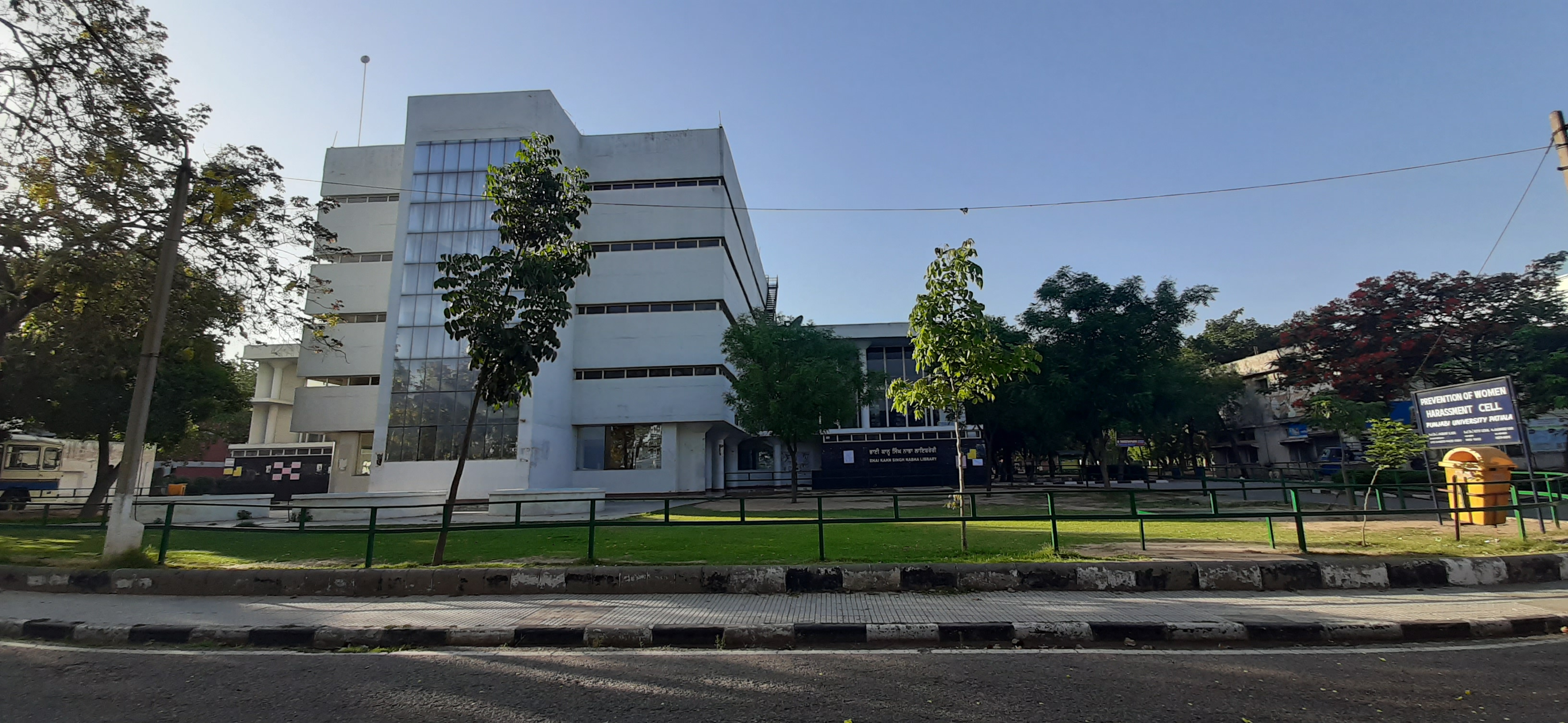
Outside view of Bhai Kahn Singh Nabha Library

Bhai Kahn Singh Nabha Central Library is a hub of academic and research activities. It stocks more than 415,000 books and subscribes to several hundred journals. The library is kept open for 360 days of the year from 8.15 a.m. to 8.15 p.m. The library has a reading hall, which has a capacity for 400 readers. A separate hall for using the personal books and a Reading Room has been provided at the ground floor. One night Reading Room remains open from 8.00 p.m. to 6.00 a.m. Ganda Singh Punjabi Reference Library, which is an integral part of the library, is housed in a new building interlinked with the main building. This part of the library has 41,548 books on Punjabi Language, Literature, Punjab History and Culture. The University Library is maintains libraries in some of the departments at the campus, Extension Library at S.A.S.Nagar (Mohali), and a Library at Regional Center Bathinda. Besides, Balbir Singh Sahitya Kendra, Dehradun has a library containing rare books and manuscripts.

=== Awards and achievements ===
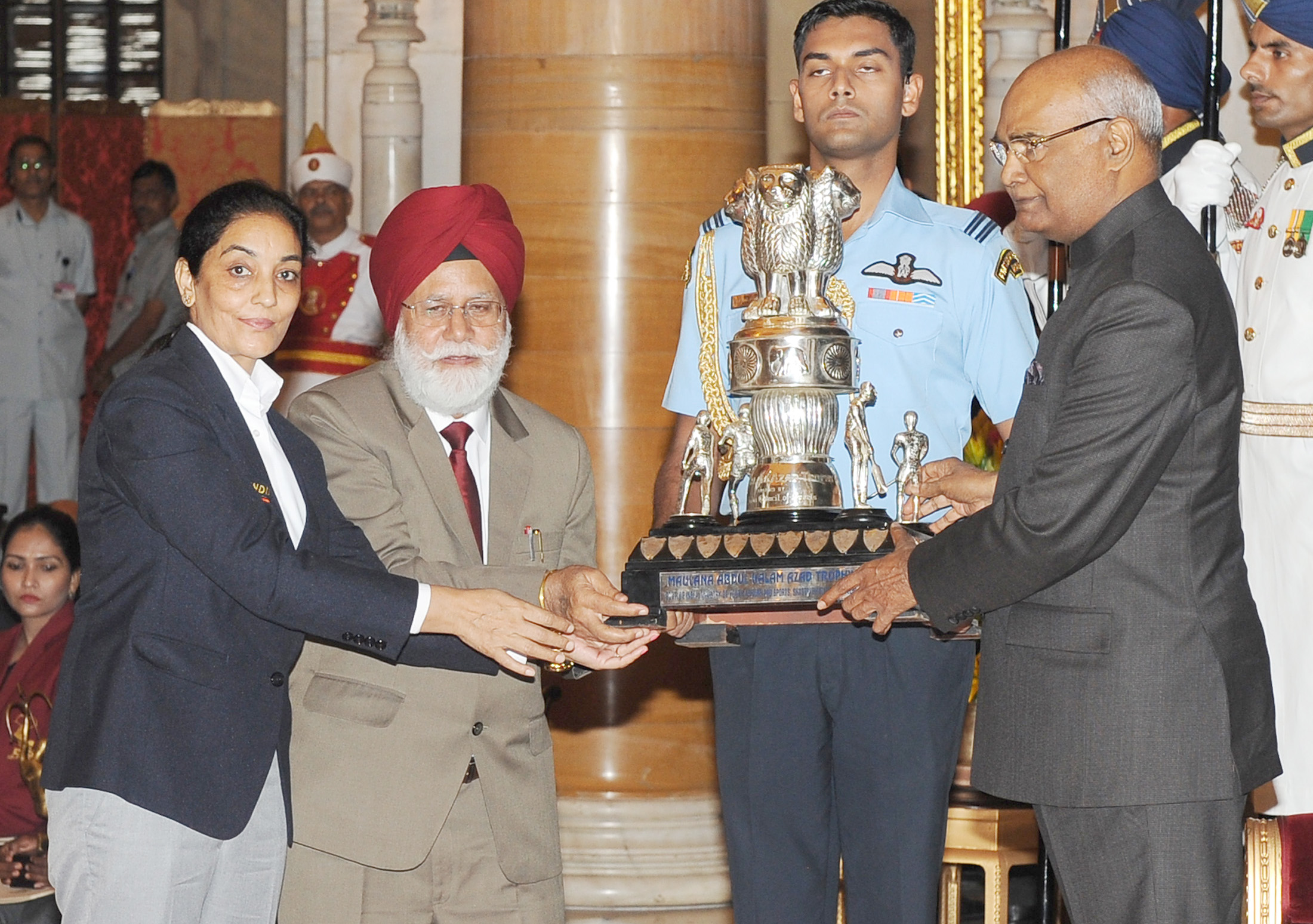
MAKA trophy awarded in 2016–17

- Punjabi University was awarded the Maulana Abul Kalam Azad (MAKA) Trophy for excellence in sports for a record six-times in year 2006–07, 2007–08 and 2013–17.
- The Youth Welfare Department organizes activities all year round. The Punjabi University has won unique distinctions in youth festivals organized by the school's Association of Indian Universities in collaboration with the Ministry of Youth Affairs, government of India, and other events.
  - The university has won overall second position in National Inter-University Youth Festival, won overall championship in orth Zone Inter-University Youth Festival many times, has won overall championship in Punjab State Inter-University Youth Festival repeatedly and has won overall championship many times in All India Inter-University Punjabi Cultural Festival. Students of Punjabi University have had the privilege of representing India in the festivals of India held in the former USSR, Mauritius, Spain, China, Germany and U.A.E. (Dubai). Apart from the above-mentioned activities, the Department of Youth Welfare organizes hiking, trekking, mountaineering and rock climbing courses, holds youth leadership training camps, prepares the students for participation in All India Level Youth Festivals, organizes Rotract Club, Young Cultural Club, Lee Club and Youth Club. It organizes Yoga Training Camps for the benefit of students of the university teaching departments and colleges. The department publishes the Yuvak Sabha Magazine and holds literary and cultural competitions.
- The National Service Scheme being implemented by the NSS Department helps students to participate in different programs of social service and national development.
- The university has developed a particular expertise in Sikh Studies and Punjabi Historical Studies. Concerted efforts are being done in developing a translation programme in Punjabi and English. To develop an association with the outstanding scholars in Punjabi language, literature and culture, the university offers Life Fellowships, Senior Fellowships and Fellowships to the eminent scholars in these fields.
- A new faculty of Arts and Culture has been created. Originality and authenticity in the pursuit of Sikh Studies is another area which is receiving more attention and energy. Balbir Singh Sahitya Kendra Dehradun is being developed as an Advanced Center for Sikh Studies. Punjabi University has established the first ever overseas center for teaching of Punjabi as a foreign language at Espanola, New Mexico.
- The university established its own publication bureau which is actively engaged in publishing research work of the academic community. More than 2000 titles have been published.

== Student life ==
=== Sports ===
Students are encouraged to take active part in sports. Facilities for games such as hockey, football, cricket, basketball, volleyball, athletics, etc. and well as indoor games are provided. The Punjabi University has a large gymnasium and a hall for indoor games. It is one of the very few institutions in India to possess its own velodrome.

The university has been awarded Maulana Abul Kalam Azad (MAKA) Trophy nine times, the latest being in the year 2016–2017. MAKA Trophy represents the highest award given for inter-university sports and university sportsperson performance in international and national arena by the Government of India.

=== Hostels ===
There are three residential hostels for boys and four residential hostels for girls. The hostels house 4000 students. In addition to this, separate boys and girls hostel for engineering college have started functioning.

=== Health services ===
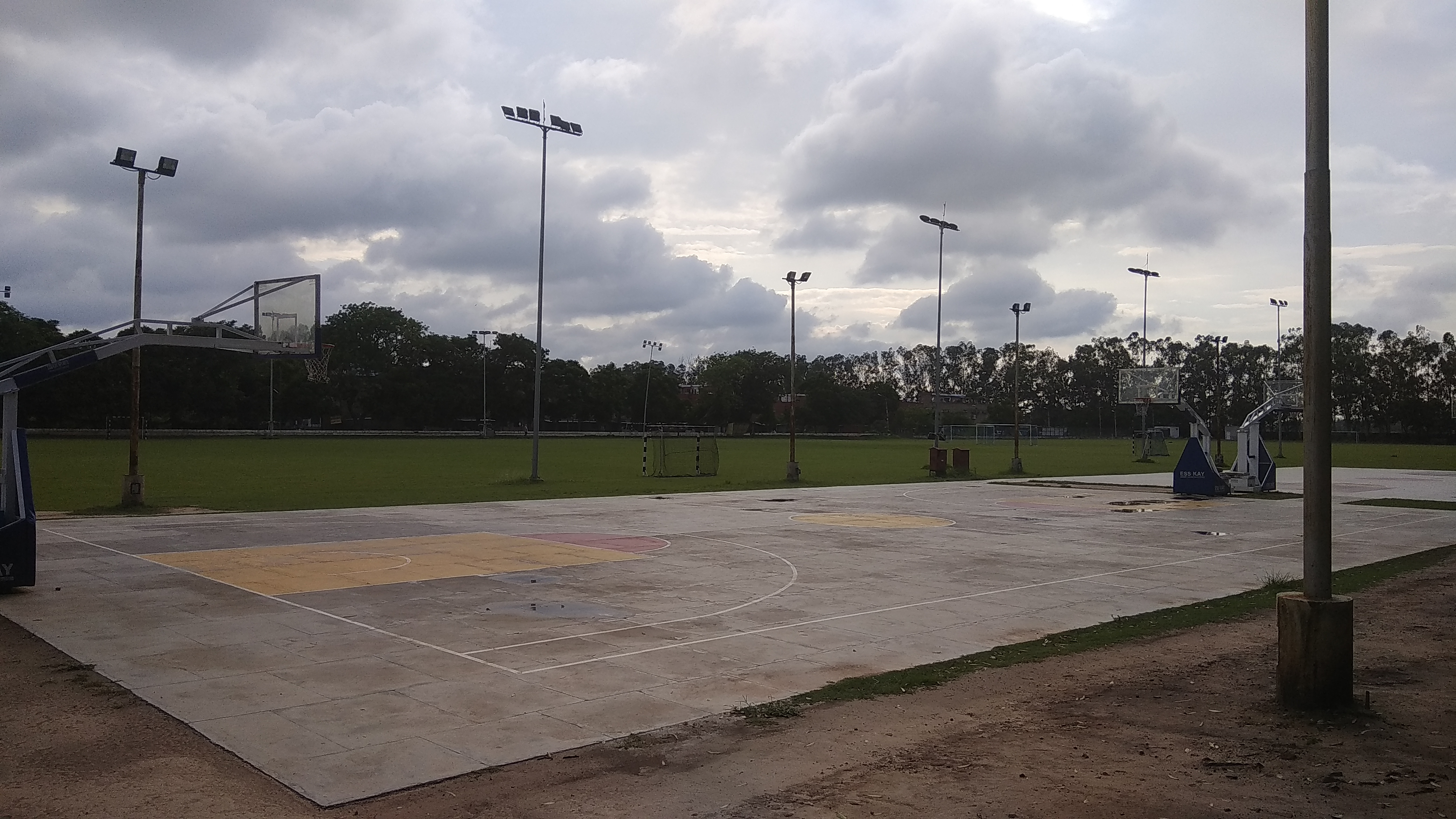
Punjabi University, a hub of sporting excellence

A health center has an X-ray unit and a laboratory for medical tests. The center has an AIDS awareness wing. Students are entitled to free medical aid by the University Health Center.

=== Other facilities ===
The university has also established a placement cell for personality development and job assistance to students. An IAS training centre has been established at university, where coaching for various competitive exams have been imparted. The transport department runs a fleet of buses for linking the campus to various parts of Patiala city.

== Notable people ==
Punjabi University's graduates have found success in a variety of diverse fields including cultural, political, film industry, social-service, public and private sectors. The list contains many people including current and former faculty and Alumni.

- Dalip Kaur Tiwana, Punjabi writer and Faculty
- Narinder Singh Kapoor, Punjabi Writer
- Gulzar Singh Sandhu, Journalism faculty
- Gurdas Maan, Punjabi singer
- Gurpreet Singh Lehal, Computer science faculty
- Jagmeet Singh Brar, Politician, Lawyer, Writer and Poet
- Navneet Kaur Dhillon, Miss India 2013
- Pammi Bai, Folk singer
- Parneet Kaur, Compound Archer
- Prem Singh Chandumajra
- Sardar Anjum, Poet and Urdu faculty
- Sardara Singh Johl, Economist
- Surjit Patar, Punjabi poet
- Bhagwant Singh Mann, Chief Minister Of Punjab
- Binnu Dhillon, Actor and Comedian
- Dev Kharoud, Actor
- Jimmy Shergill, Actor
- Ammy Virk, Singer and Actor

== See also ==
- Punjabi University Guru Kashi Campus
- Yadavindra College of Engineering

== Photo gallery ==
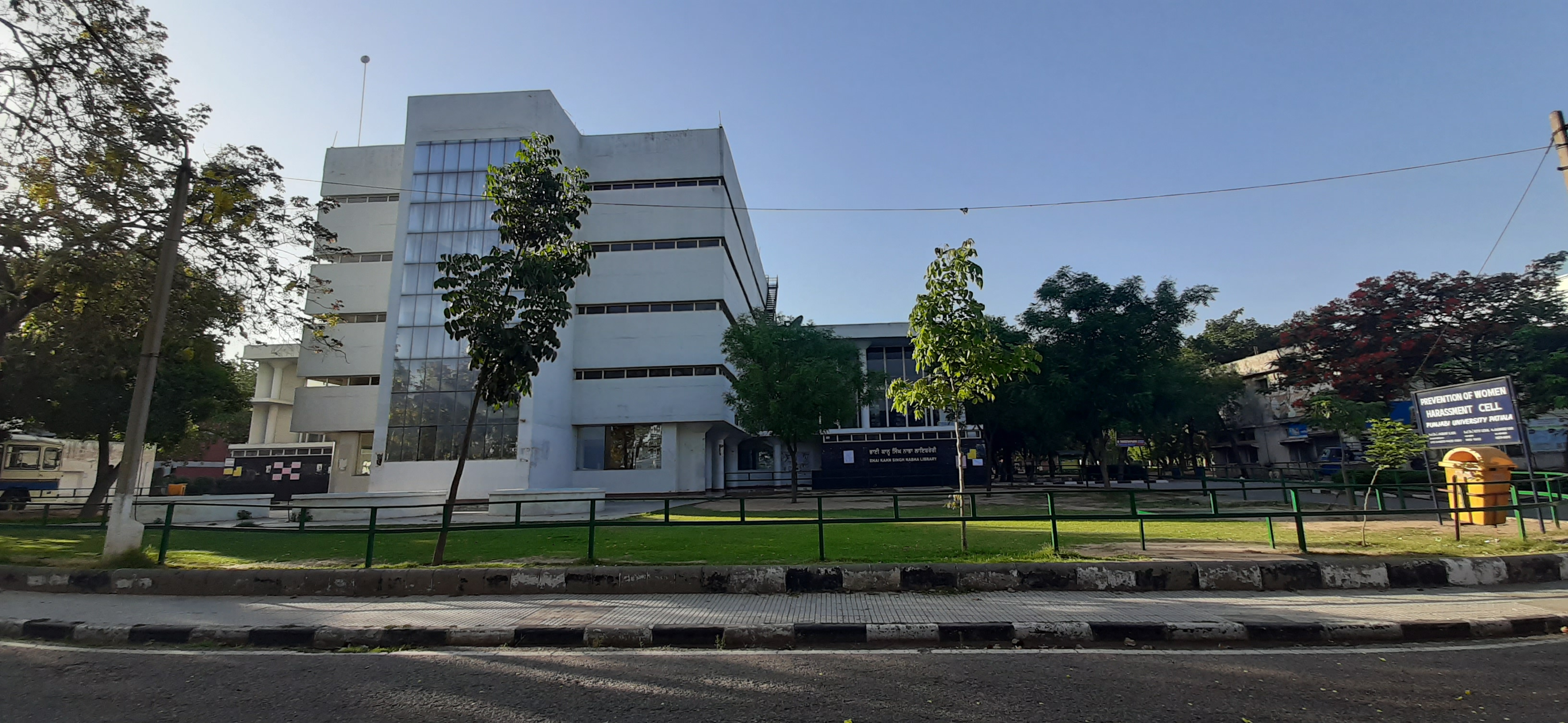
Bhai Kahn Singh Nabha library

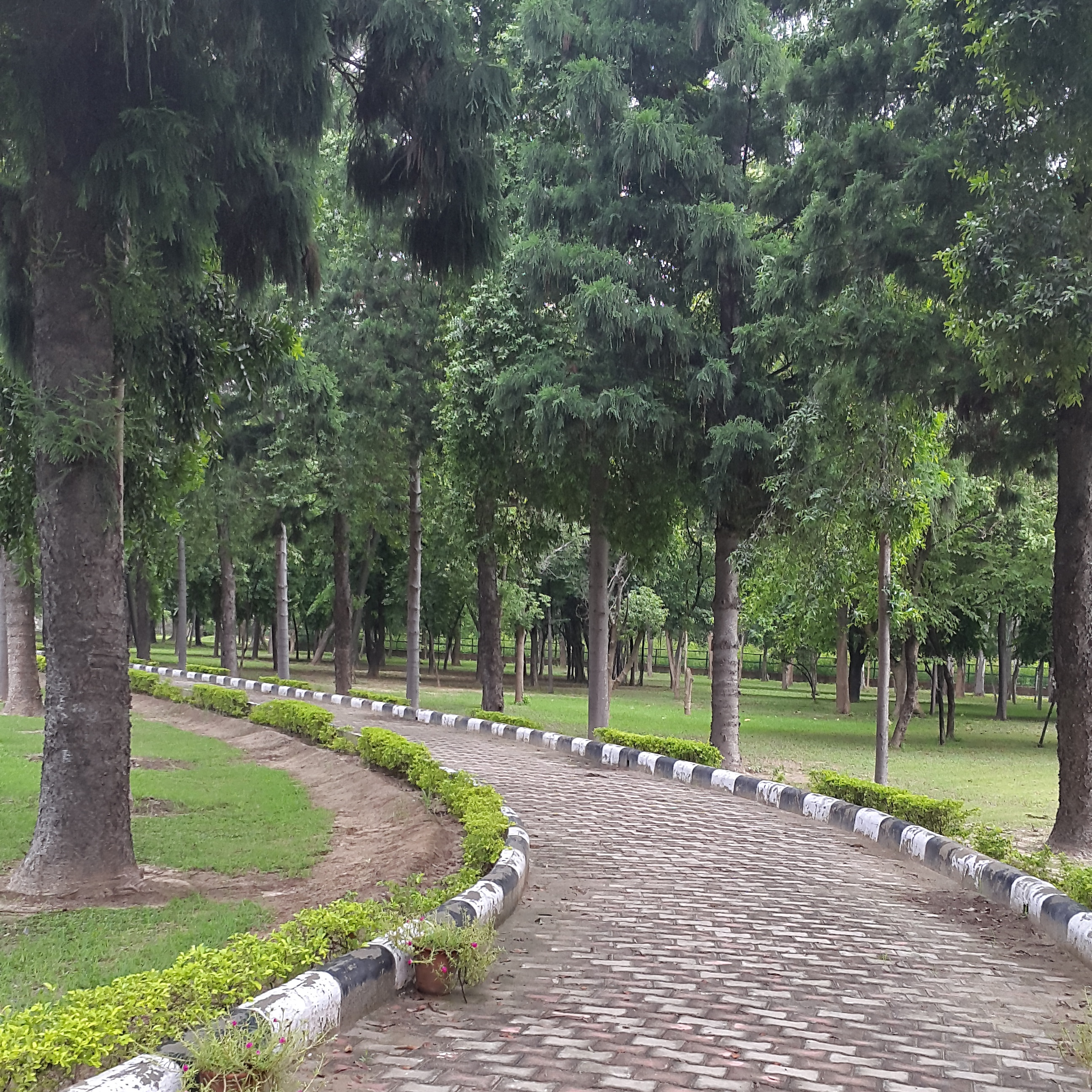
Botanical Gardens

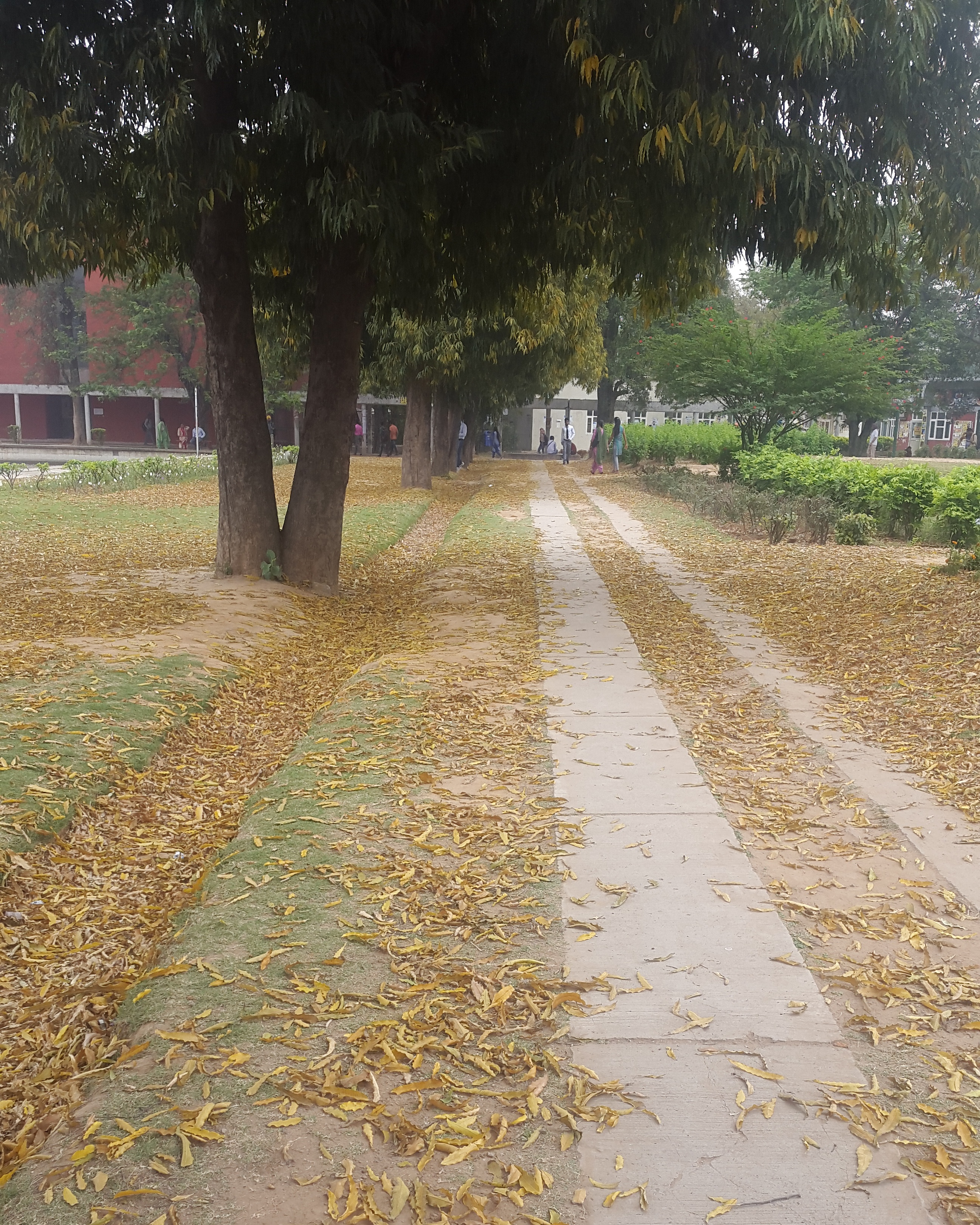
Path to Distance Education deptt.

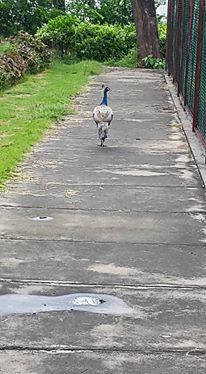
University is home to many peacocks

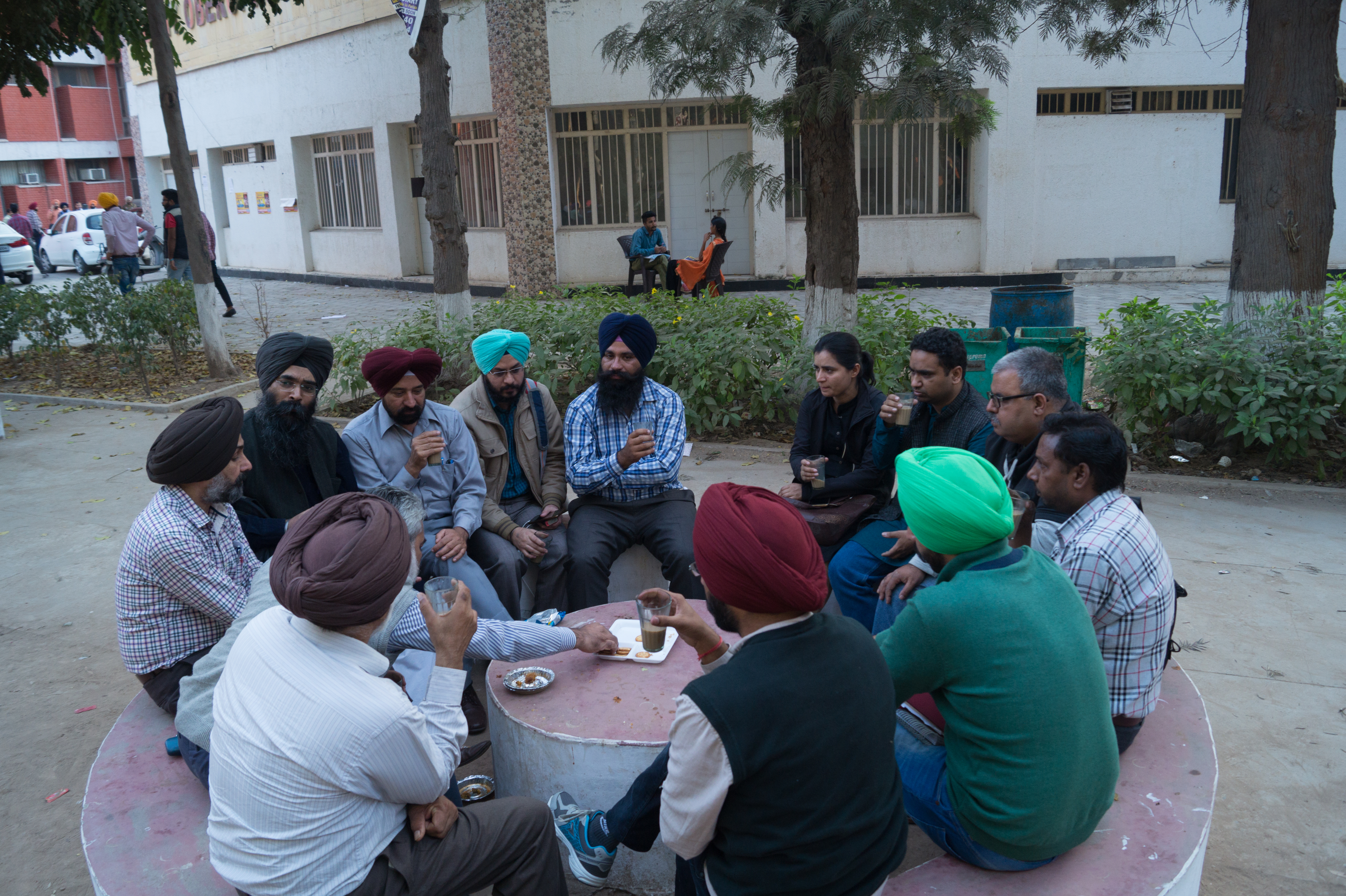
Group of students

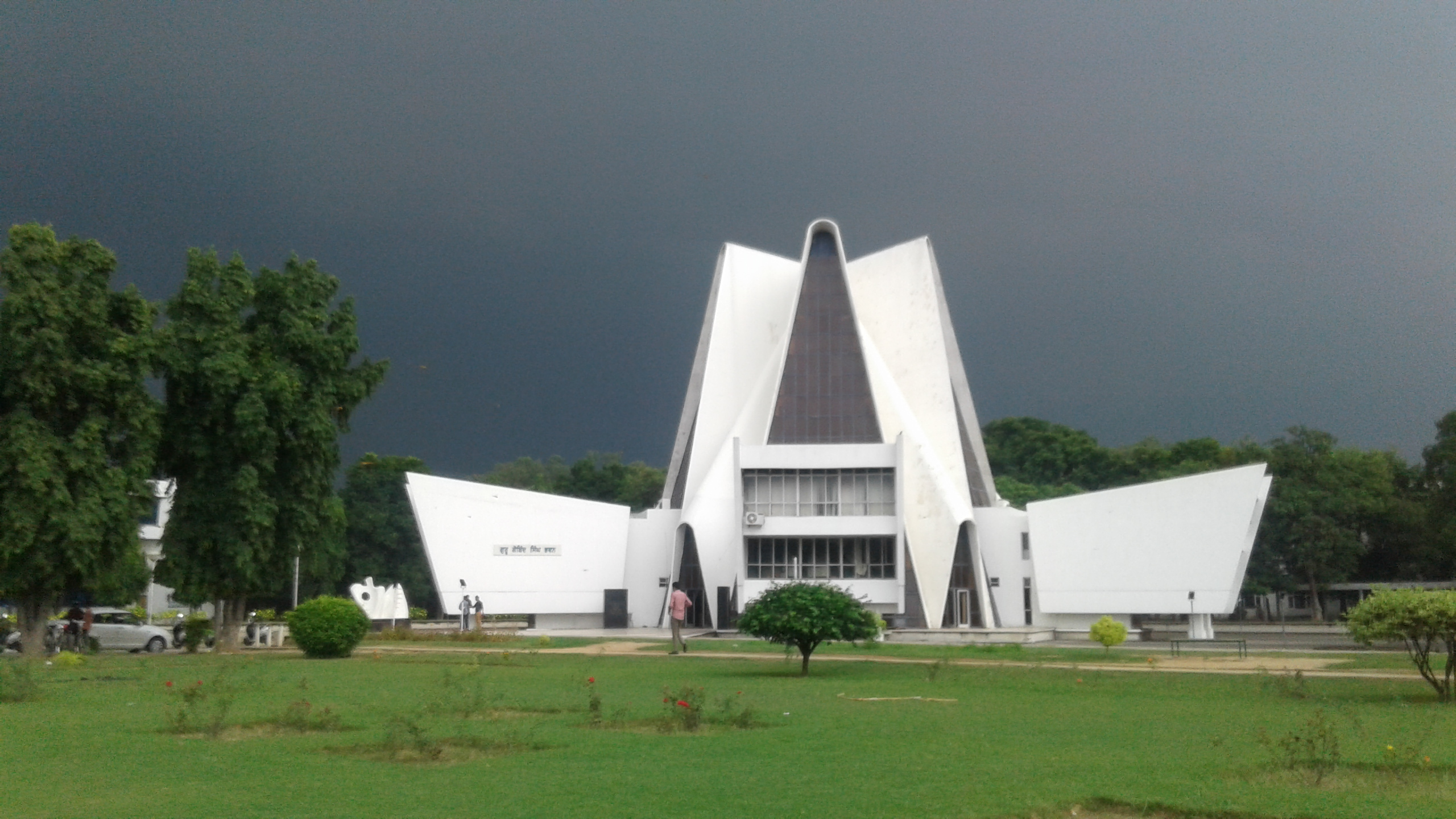
Famous Guru Gobind Singh Bhawan

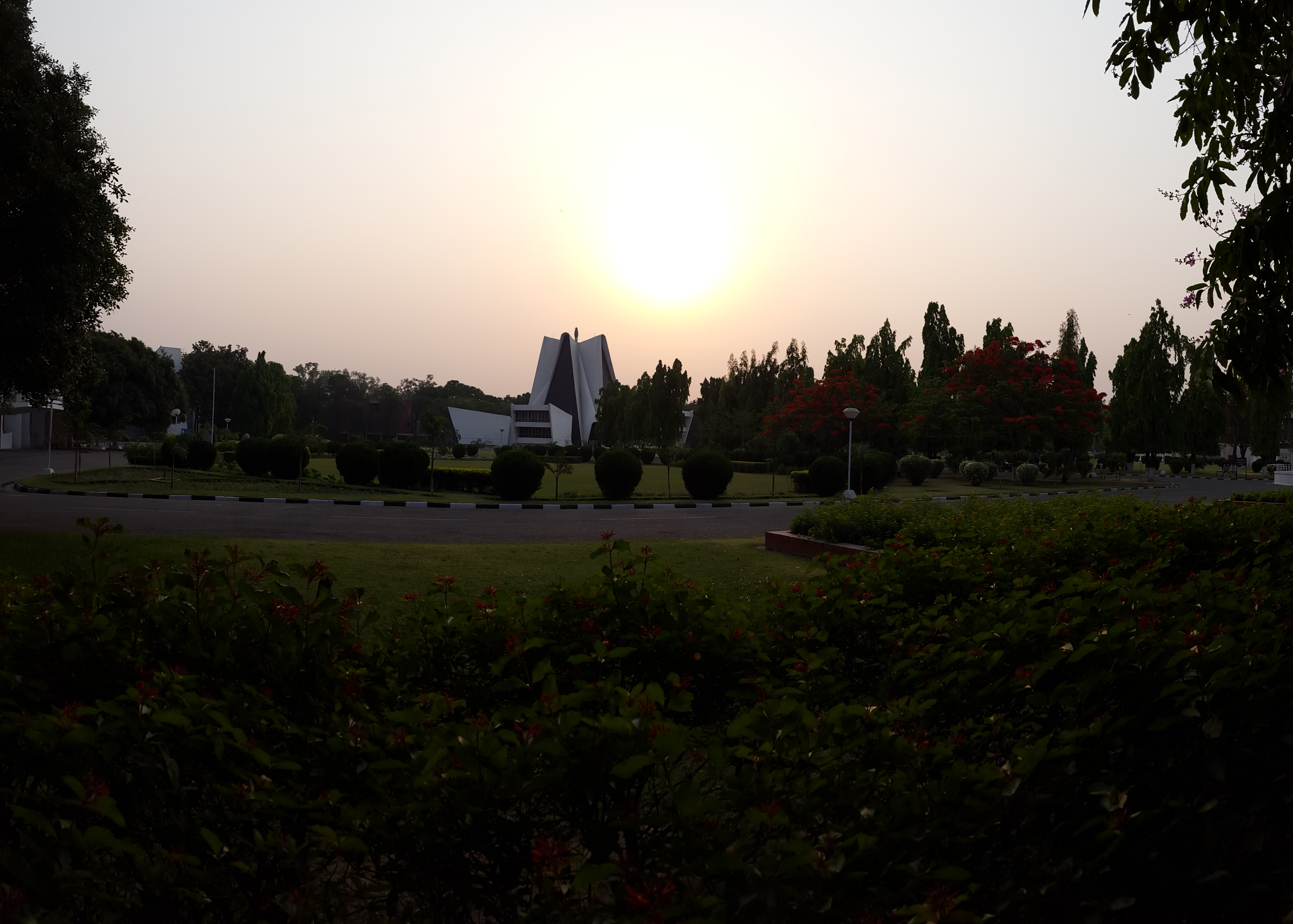
Serenity in University

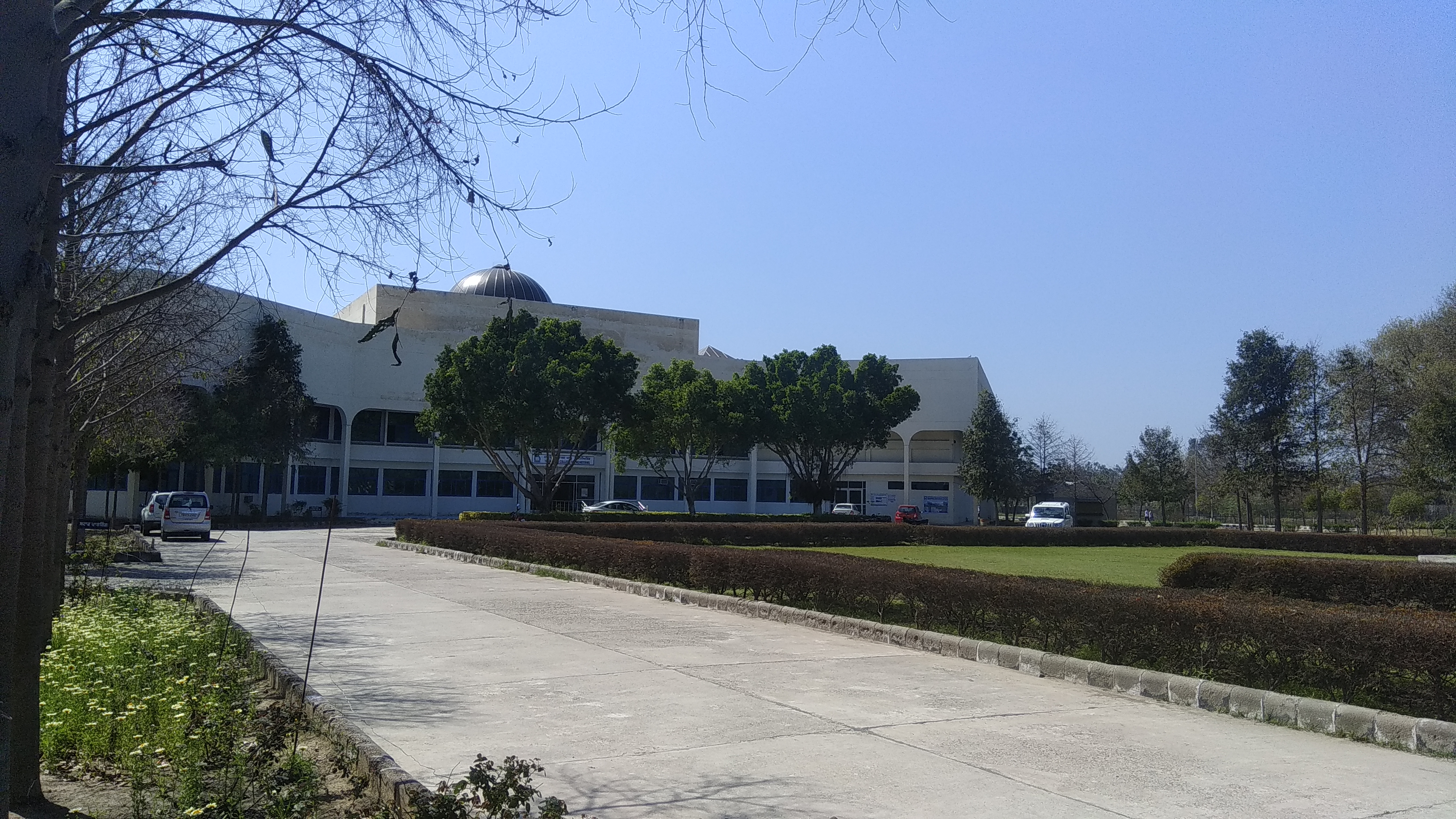
Yadavindra College of Engineering

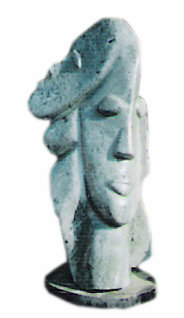
A sculpture in the Art Gallery

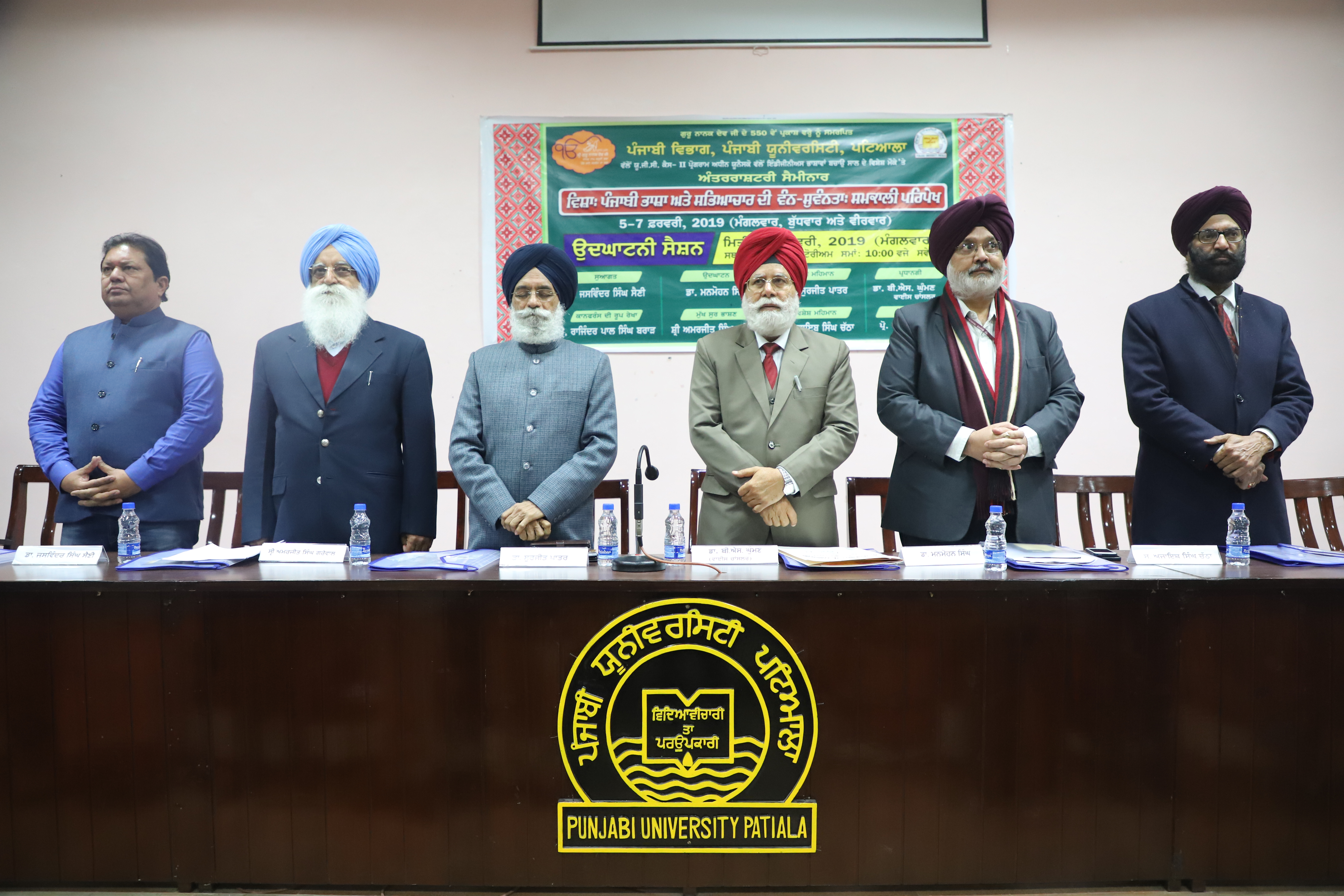
VC presiding over a conference

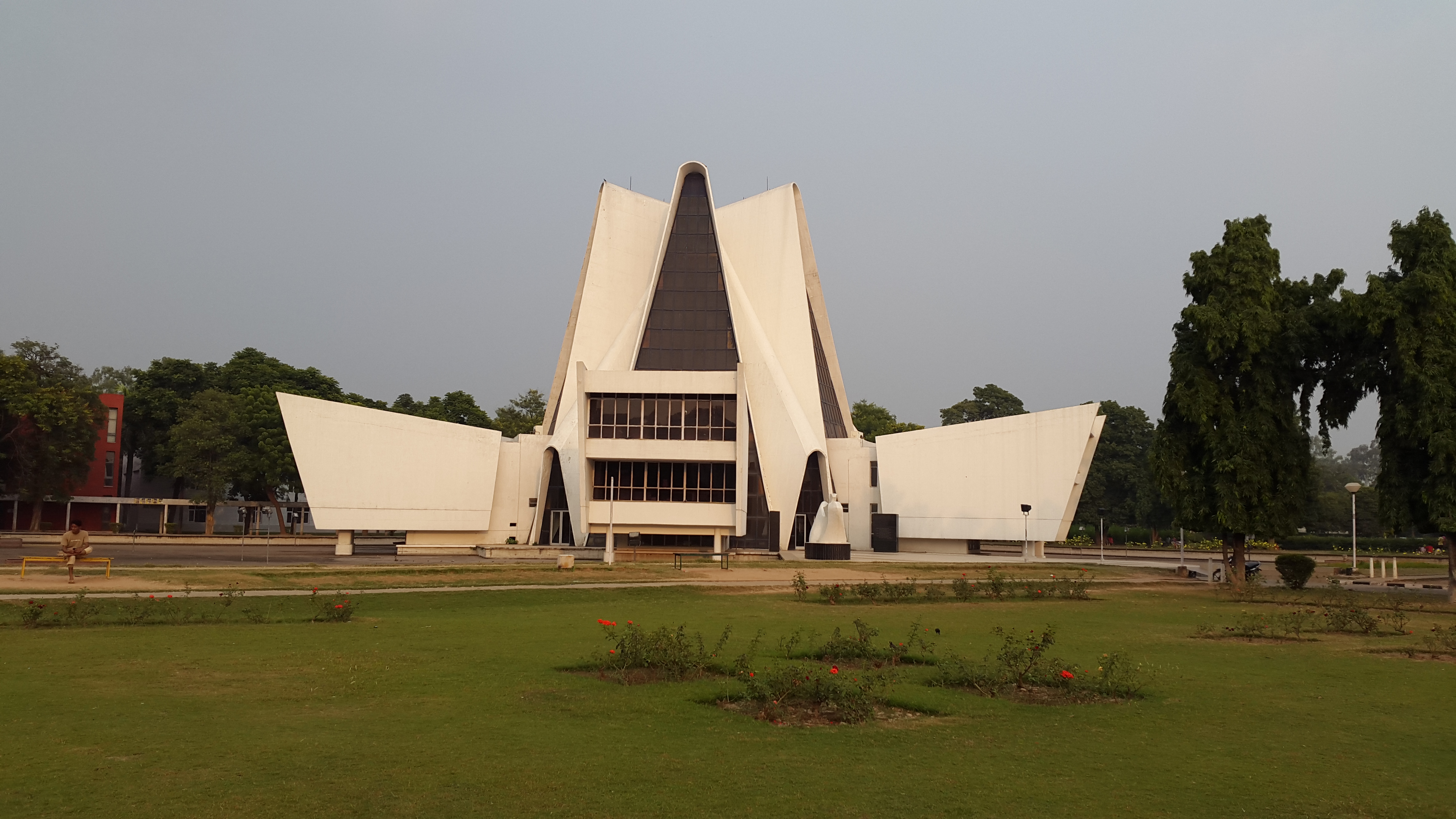
Guru Gobind Singh Bhawan

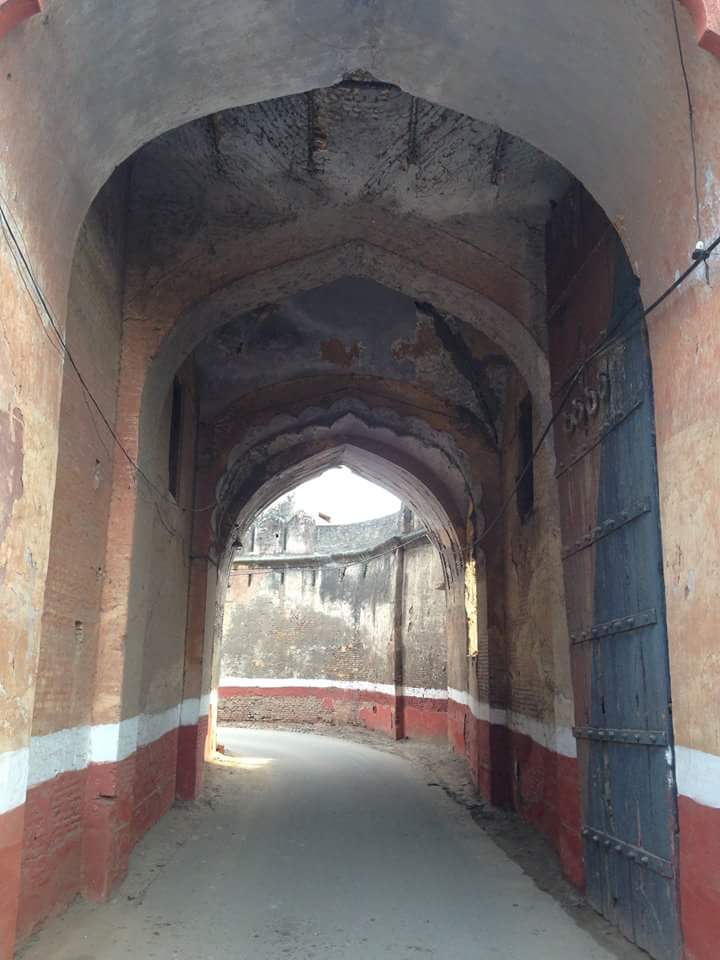
nearby Bahadurgarh Fort

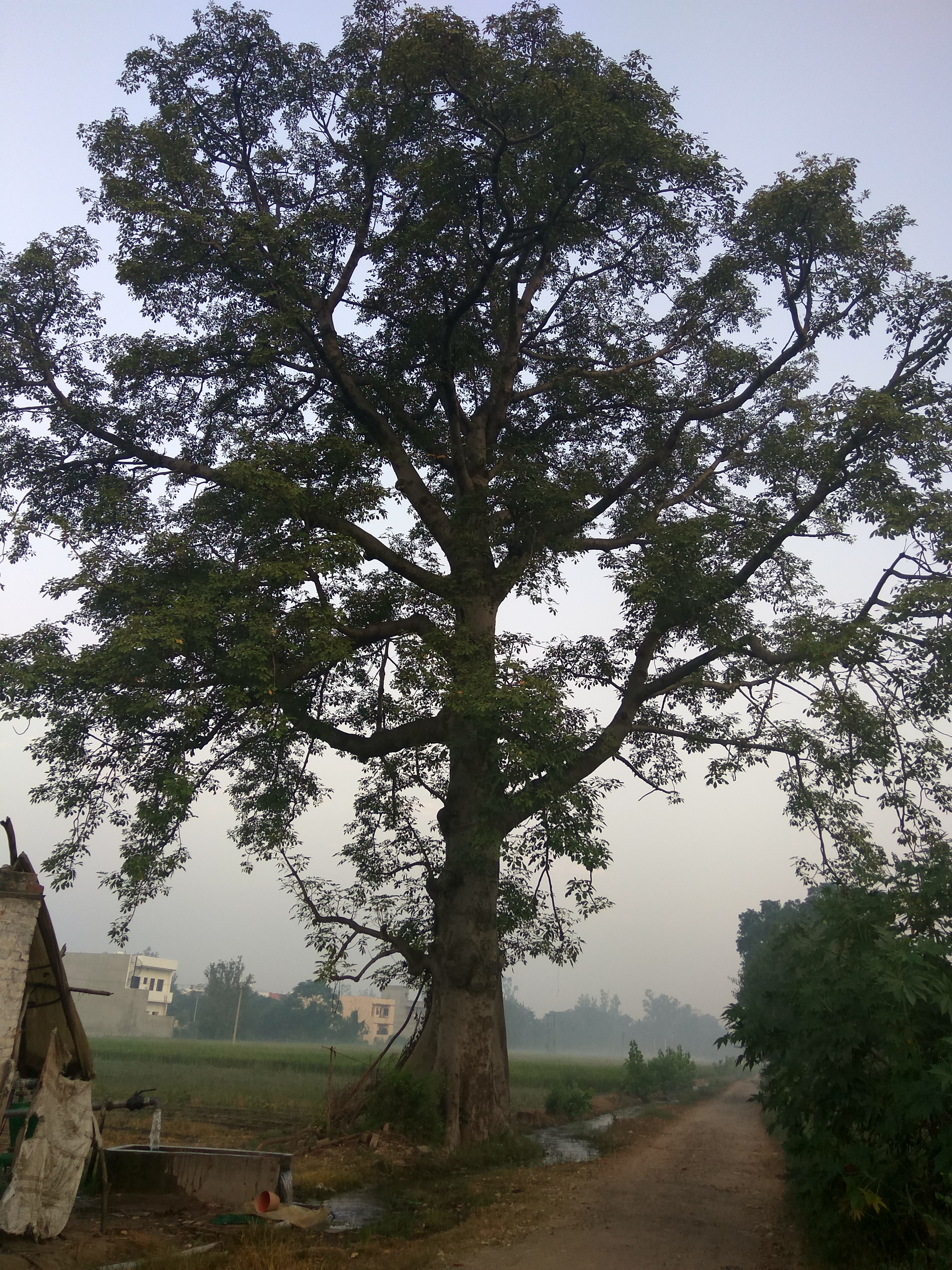
Bombax ceiba - near Punjabi University
