= Sardar Anjum =

Indian poet (Shayar and philosopher

- Born: 1941
- Died: 10 July 2015 (aged 73–74)
- Citizenship: Indian
- Occupations: Writer, Poet,
- Writing career
- Language: Urdu and Hindi
- Genres: Ghazal, Nazm
- Notable awards: Padma Bhushan and Padma Shri

Sardar Anjum (1941 – 10 July 2015) was an Indian poet (Shayar and philosopher. He is the author of 25 books, and many audio cassettes/records of his poems. He had served Panjab University as Head of Urdu Department and has been Chancellor's nominee at Punjabi University Patiala. His feature film, Karzdar is a venture to bring the two countries, India and Pakistan together in bonds. He died on 10 July 2015 at Panchkula, Haryana.

== Awards and recognition ==
- Padma Bhushan Award — Anjum was honoured with the Padma Bhushan Award in 2005 Citation Literature and Education. This is India's third largest civilian honour
- Padma Shri Award (1991), India's fourth highest civilian honour.
- The Millennium Peace Award - Anjum has been honored by many literary societies, cultural forums and creative foundations both in India and Abroad. In 2000, former first lady Hillary Clinton presented "The Millennium Peace Award" to Anjum on behalf of "International Peace Foundation of New York". The citation of this award reads - The Millennium Peace Award to Padmashri Dr. Sardar Anjum (India) for his contribution to Global Understanding and Universal Outlook.
- Punjab Ratan- Governor of Punjab Lt.Gen.J.F.R. Jacob (Retd.) presented Punjab Ratan Award to Anjum for his contribution to Life and Literature on 23 September 2001.
- Literary Award - Anjum has received 19 state awards for his literary works and activities.
- Ambassador of Peace Award - On 28 September 2002, Anjum was presented Ambassador of Peace Award by Chhattisgarh Chief Minister Sh. Ajit Jogi.
