= Gurpreet Singh Lehal =

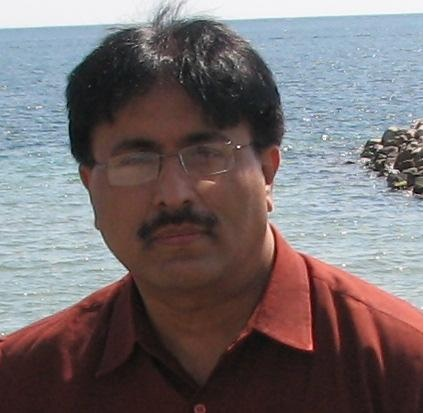
- Gurpreet Singh Lehal
- Born: 6 February 1963 (age 63); Delhi, India
- Education: Panjab University
- Occupations: Professor in the Computer Science Department, Punjabi University, Patiala

Gurpreet Singh Lehal (born 6 February 1963) is a professor in the Computer Science Department, Punjabi University, Patiala and director of the Advanced Centre for Technical Development of Punjabi Language Literature and Culture. He is noted for his work in the application of computer technology in the use of the Punjabi language both in the Gurmukhi and Shahmukhi script.

A postgraduate in mathematics from Panjab University, he did his master's degree in computer science from Thapar Institute of Engineering and Technology and Ph.D. in computer science on Gurmukhi optical character recognition (OCR) system from Punjabi University, Patiala.

== Background ==
As a researcher Lehal's main contribution has been development of technologies related to the computerization of the Punjabi language. Prominent among these are first Gurmukhi OCR, first bilingual Gurmukhi/Roman OCR, first Punjabi font identification and conversion system, first multi-font Punjabi spell checker, first high accuracy Gurmukhi-Shahmukhi and Shahmukhi-Gurmukhi transliteration systems and first Intelligent Predictive Roman-Gurmukhi transliteration techniques for simplifying Punjabi typing. Lehal has published more than 100 research papers in various national and international journals and conference proceedings. Lehal has handled research projects worth more than 43 million Rupees, including three international projects, which were awarded in an open competition among contestants from more than 30 countries. As a software engineer, Lehal has developed more than 25 software systems, including the first commercial Punjabi word processor, Akhar. As an academic, Lehal has taught and supervised research activities of postgraduate and doctorate students. He has guided more than 100 postgraduate Research scholars and 11 PhD students on various topics related to the computerization of Punjabi, Hindi, Urdu and Sindhi languages.

== Work ==
Lehal has been working for more than fifteen years on different projects related to computerization of Punjabi, Hindi, Urdu and Sindhi languages and has been a pioneer in developing technical solutions for these languages. For the first time, many new technologies have been developed by him including Intelligent Predictive Roman-Gurmukhi transliteration techniques for simplifying Punjabi typing, Punjabi spell checker, Intelligent Punjabi and Hindi font converter, bilingual Gurmukhi/Roman OCR and Sindhi-Devnagri transliteration. Many other products for popularizing Punjabi and breaking the script and language barriers have been developed under his leadership. Some of these products which are being widely used include a multi-media based website for Punjabi teaching, Gurmukhi-Shahmukhi transliteration utility, Punjabi-Hindi translation software, Urdu-Hindi transliteration software, Punjabi Search Engine, Punjabi Text-to-Speech Synthesis System, Punjabi text summarization system and Punjabi grammar checker.

== Language Software and Technologies developed ==
- First Gurmukhi Optical Character Recognition System
- First Bilingual Gurmukhi/Roman Optical Character Recognition System
- First Punjabi word processor (Akhar)
- First Intelligent Predictive Romanized typing utility for Gurmukhi text
- First Punjabi font to Unicode & Reverse conversion utility
- First Intelligent Punjabi/Hindi Font Recognition System
- First Sindhi to Devnagri and reverse Transliteration System
- First Punjabi Text Summarization System (Project Leader)
- First Punjabi Text to Speech Synthesis System (Project Leader)
- Urdu Optical Character Recognition System
- Sodhak:: Punjabi Spell Checker
- Urdu/Kashmiri to Roman Script Transliteration Software
- Urdu to Devnagri Transliteration Software
- Devnagri to Urdu Transliteration Software
- Gurmukhi-Shahmukhi (Urdu) transliteration Software
- PunjabiKhoj, Customized Search Engine for Punjabi (Project Leader)
- Shahmukhi (Urdu) to Gurmukhi Transliteration online software (Project Leader)
- Online Punjabi teaching website (Project Leader)
- Multi-media enabled Gurmukhi-Shahmukhi-English Dictionary (Project Leader)
- Punjabi to Hindi Machine Translation System (Project Leader)
- Hindi to Punjabi Machine Translation System (Project Leader)
- Punjabi Grammar Checker (Project Leader)
- Punjabi Morphological Analyser & Generator (Project Leader)
- Gurmukhi to Roman Transliteration System (Project Leader)
