= Pammi Bai =

Pami Bai
- Also known as: Bhangre Da Sher
- Born: Paramjit Singh Sidhu; 70 years Jakhepal, Sangrur, Punjab, India
- Genres: Punjabi; Bhangra; Folk
- Occupations: Singer musician choreographer – bhangra
- Years active: 1980–present
- Label: Folk Studio
- Website: http://www.pammibai.com

Paramjit Singh Sidhu, professionally known as Pami Bai, is an Indian singer, songwriter and Bhangra dancer from Patiala.

He is considered one of the most notable figures in the world of Punjabi music specialising in the traditional folk dance of Punjab; Bhangra. Since 1987, he gained national attention with the song "Ashke." Since then, he has gone on to record 12 albums, and has performed internationally with his band. He was given the Sangeet Natak Akademi Award on 4 October 2016 by President Pranab Mukheerjee at Rashtrapati Bhawan in New Delhi for his contribution to the world of Punjabi folk music.

== Early life ==
He was born in Jakhepal in the district of Sangrur, Punjab, India to Sardar Partap Singh Baghi. During his childhood days his inclination towards Bhangra, the folk dance of Punjab, increased and started participating in various school functions. Later during his college days he participated in Inter-University functions, and pursued it to become the Dance Director of Bhangra. While he was doing his M.A. he started singing amateurishly. In 1982 he recorded his first song Nachdi Jawani. In coming years, he went over to 20 countries to perform as a bhangra dancer and folk singer. He was also involved in Theatre acts and performed on Ram Lilla stages as comedy artists during free time.

== Music career ==
He recorded his first audio cassette in 1987, along with the late Narinder Biba. Then he recorded an audio cassette with Surinder Kaur, a renowned TV and radio artist. One of his songs was recorded by Jagjit Singh in his audio cassette released in 1991. Two of his songs were recorded by Music Today. He has worked with music directors like Surinder Bachan, Charanjit Ahuja, Kuljit singh, Pandit Jawala Parshad and Ved Sethi. However the real break for him came with music director Kuljit Singh the release of "Ji ne jan nu karda" and "Rangli Dunia Ton", His album Nach Pauni Dhamal was released in 2005, followed by the Aman Hayer produced Punjaban in 2009. The title song from the album Punjabian Di Balle Balle featured a video that originated in the Punjab He has since released the album Jugni and Diamond Sohniye (2015).

=== Tours ===
In 1989, he organised his first cultural performance on the Indian Independence day, and in subsequent years he visited many European countries. In 2004 at Cultural Presentation in the World Punjabi Conference held at Lahore, Pakistan he was one of the few delegates who had gone to represent India. Later in 2007 he went on to the tour of USA, for various cultural shows. After working as chief judge in the World Punjabi Folk Dances Competitions held at Toronto during the year 2009, he was invited again to perform in 2014.

=== Music style and instruments ===
Pami Bai is an adept of Punjabi folk music and his songs include the traditional music instruments of toomba, algoza, toombi, sarangi, wanjli, bugdu, been, dhadd, dholki, dhol, ghara, chimta, dafli and dhoru. His songs include various Bhangra forms like Jhoomar, Malwai, Giddha, Dhandas. He is widely known to be a guardian of old Punjabi culture, and mother tongue Punjabi where in this time the Punjabi music industry is influenced by western culture.

== Discography ==
Year	Album	Record label	Info	Music
1987	Ankhi Sher Punjab De	Simran Video	Tracks 8	Ved Sethi
1989	Amrit Baaja Wale Da	Simran Video	Tracks 8	Jwala Prasad
1993	Jawani Awaazaan Maardi	Cattrack Chandigarh	Tracks 8	Varinder Bachan
1994	Majje Malwe Duabe	Saga Delhi	Tracks 8	Charanjit Ahuja
2000	Dance With Pammi Bai	His Master's Voice	Tracks 8	Charanjit Ahuja
2002	Nach Nach Pauni Dhammal	His Master's Voice	Tracks 8	Kuljit Singh
2003	Giddha Malwaian Da	T-Series	Tracks 8	Kuljit Singh
2005	Nachde Punjabi	FineTouch	Tracks 8	Kuljit Singh
2006	Putt Punjabi – Son of Punjab	Frankfinn	Tracks 10	Kuljit Singh
2007	Dhol Te Dhamaalan	FrankFinn	Tracks 10	Kuljit Singh
2009	Punjaban	T-Series	Tracks 8	Aman Hayer
2011	Punjabiyan Di Balle Balle	Vajhali Records	Tracks 8	Kuljit Singh /Harjeet Guddu
2013	Jugni	Live Folk Studio	Tracks 10	Popsy/Kuljit Singh /Harjeet Guddu
2015	Diamond Sohniye	Jass Records	Tracks 11	Gurmeet Singh
2017	The 37th Chapter Of Pammi Bai	T-Series	Tracks 12	Gurmeet Singh, Aman Hayer, Jaidev Kumar & Rupin Kahlon
