= List of Punjabi authors =

This page is a list of noteworthy Punjabi authors, who were born or lived in the Punjab, or who write in the Punjabi language.

== Chronological list ==
=== The Beginning Of Punjabi Literature ===
First and the foremost poems of Punjabi language was of Nath-Yogi in origin.

=== 12th century ===
- Fariduddin Ganjshakar (1173–1266)

=== 15th- 16th century ===
- Guru Nanak (15 April 1469 - 22 Sept 1539)

=== 16th century ===
- Shah Hussain (1538 – 1599)
- Bhai Gurdas (1551–1636)
- Pilu (1580 to 1675)

=== 17th century ===
- Damodar Das Arora (1605 – 1656)
- Sultan Bahu (1628–1691)
- Bhai Nand Lal (1633–1713)
- Bhai Mani Singh (1644–1738)
- Bulleh Shah (1680–1757)
- Ali Haider Multani (1690-1785)

=== 18th century ===
- Waris Shah (1722–1798)
- Hashim (1735–1843)
- Shah Mohammad (1780–1862)
- Ratan Singh Bhangu (died 1846)

=== 19th century ===
- Pundit Tara Singh (1822–1891)
- Shardha Ram Phillauri (1837–1881)
- Pandit Lekh Ram (1858–1897)
- Kahn Singh Nabha (1861–1938)
- Akali Kaur Singh (1866–1953)
- Bhai Vir Singh (1872–1957)
- Kripa Sagar (1875–1939)
- Dhani Ram Chatrik (1876–1954)
- Bhai Randhir Singh (1878–1961)
- Puran Singh(1881–1931)
- Bhai Jodh Singh (1882–1981)
- Sahib Singh (1892–1977)
- Gurbaksh Singh Preetlari (1895–1977)
- Nanak Singh (1897–1971)
- Jaswant Singh (Khoji) ( -1999)

=== 20th century ===
- Partap Singh (1904–1984)
- Bhagat Puran Singh (1904–1992)
- Mohan Singh (1905–1978)
- Sujan Singh (1909–1993)
- Gurbachan Singh Talib (1911–1986)
- Gurdas Ram Alam (1912-1989)
- Balraj Sahni (1913–1973)
- Harcharan Singh (1914-2006)
- Sharif Kunjahi (1915–2007)
- Balwant Gargi (1916–2003)
- Kartar Singh Duggal (1917–2012)
- Amrita Pritam (1919–2005)
- Jaswant Singh Kanwal (1919–2020)
- Harbhajan Singh (1920–2002)
- Santokh Singh Dhir (1920–2010)
- Kulwant Singh Virk (1921–1987)
- Ajit Saini (1922–2007)
- Sukhbir (1925–2012)
- Alam Lohar (1928–1979)
- Jaswant Singh Rahi (1930–1996)
- Gurdial Singh (1933-2016)
- Buta Singh (1934–)
- Giani Sant Singh Maskeen (1934–2005)
- Anwar Masood (1935–)
- Dalip Kaur Tiwana (1935–2020)
- Dalbir Chetan (5 April 1944– 1 January 2005)
- Shiv Kumar Batalvi (1937–1973)
- Karnail Singh Somal (1940–)
- Lal Singh Dil (1943–2007)
- Narinder Singh Kapoor (1944–)
- Surjit Paatar (1945–2024)
- Chaman Lal (1947–)
- Harjinder Singh Dilgeer (1962–)
- Avtar Singh Sandhu (Paash) (1950–1988)
- Mir Tanha Yousafi (1955–)
- Gurdas Maan (1957–)
- Rupinderpal Singh Dhillon (1969-)
- Satinder Sartaj (1982-)

== Alphabetical list ==
=== A ===
- Guru Arjan Dev (1563–1606)
- Akali Kaur Singh Nihang (1866–1953)
- Amrita Pritam (1919–2005)
- Ajit Saini (1922–2007)
- Alam Lohar (1928–1979)
- Anwar Masood (1935–)
- Avtar Singh Sandhu (Pash) (1950–1988)
- Amardeep Singh Gill (born 1968)

=== B ===
- Balraj Sahni (1913–1973)
- Balwant Gargi (1916–2003)
- Bulleh Shah (1680–1757)
- Buta Singh (1934–2021)

=== C ===
- Chaman Lal (1947–)

=== D ===
- Dalbir Chetan (5 April 1944– 1 January 2005)
- Dalip Kaur Tiwana (1935–2020)
- Damodar Das Arora
- Dhani Ram Chatrik (1876–1954)

=== F ===
- Fariduddin Ganjshakar (1173–1266)

=== G ===
- Gorakh Nath (ca. 10th century)
- Gurbachan Singh Talib (1911–1986)
- Gurdas Ram Alam (1912-1989)
- Gurbaksh Singh Preetlari (1895–1977)
- Bhai Gurdas (1551–1636)
- Gurdial Singh (1933-2016)
- Gurdas Maan (1957-)

=== H ===
- Harbhajan Singh (1920–2002)
- Harjinder Singh Dilgeer (1947–)
- Hashim (1735–1843)
- Harcharan Singh (1914-2006)

=== J ===
- Jaswant Singh Kanwal (1919–)
- Jaswant Singh Rahi (1930–1996)
- Bhai Jodh Singh (1882–1981)
- Jaswant Singh (Khoji) (- 1999)

=== K ===
- Karnail Singh Somal (1940–)
- Kartar Singh Duggal (1917–2012)
- Kahn Singh Nabha (1861–1938)
- Kripa Sagar (1875–1939)
- Kulwant Singh Virk (1921–1987)

=== L ===
- Lal Singh Dil (1943–2007)

=== M ===
- Bhai Mani Singh (1666–1737)
- Mir Tanha Yousafi (1955–)
- Mohan Singh (1905–1978)

=== N ===
- Guru Nanak 15 April 1469- 22 Sept. 1539)
- Bhai Nand Lal (1633–1713)
- Nanak Singh (1897–1971)

=== P ===
- Partap Singh (1904–1984)
- Bhagat Puran Singh (1904–1992)
- Puran Singh(1881–1931)
- Pundit Tara Singh (1822–1891)

=== R ===
- Bhai Randhir Singh (1878–1961)
- Ratan Singh Bhangu (died 1846)
- Rupinderpal Singh Dhillon (1969–)
- Rupinder Inderjit (2011–)

=== S ===
- Sahib Singh (1892–1977)
- Sohan Singh Seetal (1909-1998) Poet, Novelist, historian, Authored more than 60 books
- Santokh Singh Dhir (1920–2010)
- Giani Sant Singh Maskeen (1934–2005)
- Sharif Kunjahi (1915–2007)
- Shah Mohammad (1780–1862)
- Shiv Kumar Batalvi (1937–1973)
- Sujan Singh (1909–1993)
- Sultan Bahu (1628–1691)
- Surjit Paatar (1945–)
- Shardha Ram Phillauri (1837–1881)
- Sukhbir (1925–2012)
- Sarita Skagnes

=== V ===
- Bhai Vir Singh (1872–1957)

=== W ===
- Waris Shah (1722–1798)
- Waryam Singh Sandhu (1945–)

== See also ==
- Lists of authors
- List of Punjabi poets
