= Jaswant Singh (disambiguation) =

Jaswant Singh (1938–2020) was an Indian cabinet minister.

Jaswant Singh as an Indian masculine name may also refer to:

- Jaswant Singh of Marwar (1629–1678), ruler
- Jaswant Singh II (1838–1895), Maharaja of Jodhpur
- Jaswant Singh of Bharatpur (1851–1893), ruler
- Jaswant Singh (field hockey) (1931–2022), field hockey player
- Jaswant Singh (Khoji) (pre-1960–1999), Punjabi writer

== People with the given names ==
- Jaswant Singh Bishnoi, Member of Indian Parliament
- Jaswant Singh Kanwal, Punjabi writer
- Jaswant Singh Khalra, human rights activist
- Jaswant Singh Marwah, journalist and author
- Jaswant Singh Neki, Sikh scholar
- Jaswant Singh Rahi, Punjabi poet and independence activist
- Jaswant Singh Rajput, field hockey player
- Jaswant Singh Rathor, ruler of Marwar
- Jaswant Singh Rawat, soldier
- Jaswant Singh Gill, mining engineer at the 1989 Raniganj Coalfield collapse, basis of the 2023 Indian film Mission Raniganj

== See also ==
- Yashwant Singh (disambiguation)
