= Yashwant Singh =

Yashwant Singh may refer to:

- Yashwant Singh (Lok Sabha member), member of the Lok Sabha from Uttar Pradesh
- Yashwant Singh (Uttar Pradesh Legislative Council member)
- Yashwant Singh (scientist), Indian theoretical physicist
- Yashwant Singh Parmar, Indian politician
- Thakur Yashwant Singh, fictional villain played by Danny Denzongpa in the 1990 Indian film Pyar Ke Naam Qurbaan

== See also ==
- Jaswant Singh (disambiguation)
