= Chaman Lal =

Chaman Lal may refer to:

- Chaman Lal (writer) (born 1947), Indian writer
- Chaman Lal (politician), English politician
