= Kaang =

Kaang may refer to:

- Kaang or Cagn, alternative spellings of ǀKaggen, a god in the San religion of southern Africa
- Kaang language, a Kuki-Chin language spoken by the Kaang Chins of Chin State, Burma

== See also ==
- Kaang Bong-Kiun, a South Korean neuroscientist
- Kulbir Singh Kaang, a Punjabi literary critic
- Kang (disambiguation)
