= Kulbir Singh Kaang =

Punjabi writer and critic

- Born: Kulbir Singh; 1936; Amritsar, British Punjab
- Died: 1 November, 2008 (aged 71–72); Amritsar, Punjab, India
- Other names: Dr. Kulbir Singh Kang
- Occupations: Writer; critic
- Known for: critic works

Kulbir Singh Kaang, also spelled as Kulbir Singh Kang, was an Indian Shromani Sahitya Award winning Punjabi language writer and critic. After serving the Punjabi literature, language and culture for more than 48 years, he died after a prolonged illness on 1 November 2008 at his house in Amritsar in Indian Punjab.

== Life ==
Kaang was born in 1936, to father Gurcharan Singh, in Amritsar in British Punjab. He studied higher and received Master of Arts and PhD degrees. Later, he joined as a lecturer in a government college in 1969 and got retired in 1994.

== Literary works ==
Kaang published many books on noted Punjabi writers about their life and works, including Teja Singh, Bawa Balwant and Sujan Singh. He published more than two dozen books on various topics including critic, essays, journey literature etc. and also edit some books including Principal Sujan Singh Abhinandan Granth, Panjabi Sabhiachar, Hadsian Da Mausam and Amam Baksh De Qisse.
