= Jaswant Singh Rahi =

Punjabi poet, writer, communist, freedom fighter (1913–1996)

- Born: 16 March 1913; Dera Baba Nanak, Punjab, British India
- Died: 11 April 1996 (aged 83); Dera Baba Nanak, Punjab, India
- Occupations: Poet; writer; communist; freedom fighter
- Years active: 1930–96
- Spouse: Satwant Kaur (m. 1932)

Jaswant Singh Rahi (16 March 1913 – 11 April 1996) was a Punjabi poet, writer, communist and freedom fighter. He was born in and lived his whole life in Dera Baba Nanak town of Gurdaspur district of Punjab, India. Columnist Joginder Singh Bedi stated, "Born in the holy town of Dera Baba Nanak in Gurdaspur district, the Sahit Shiromani Poet Jaswant Singh Rahi's contribution to Punjabi world of letters is no less than that of Dhani Ram Chatrik, Prof Mohan Singh (poet) and Prof Puran Singh. Rahi is popularly known for his slogan Jai Mitarta."

== Early life ==
Rahi was born in a Rajput (Jaswal) family. His family had devoted itself to India's struggle for independence from British colonial rule. He was very close to Baba Pyare Lal Bedi, a Punjabi Sikh, an author and a philosopher. He married Satwant Kaur, a Sikh from Fatehgarh Churian of Gurdaspur district in Punjab. They had eight children, including three sons – Rajwant Singh Rahi, Inderjeet Singh Rahi and Sarbjeet Singh Rahi; and five daughters – Late Ms Sukhbir Kaur (social activist and Punjabi writer), Santosh, Raj Kumari, Mohanjeet and Kanwaljeet. His daughters-in-law are Charanjeet Kaur, Ravinder Rahi and Kulwinder Kaur.

His grandchildren include Dr. Baninder Rahi (journalist and media educator who has worked with the Indian Express, The Pioneer and Daily Post India). Other grandchildren are Kavita Rahi, Bikramjeet Singh Rahi, Natasha Rahi, Navkiran Rahi, Prateek Rahi and Sarvnoor Singh Rahi.

He mentored writers including Rajwant Kaur Nagi and Shiv Kumar Batalvi during his early years. Batalvi spent weeks at Rahi's house in Dera Baba Nanak.

== Works and recognition ==
Some of the awards and honors conferred on Jaswant Singh Rahi

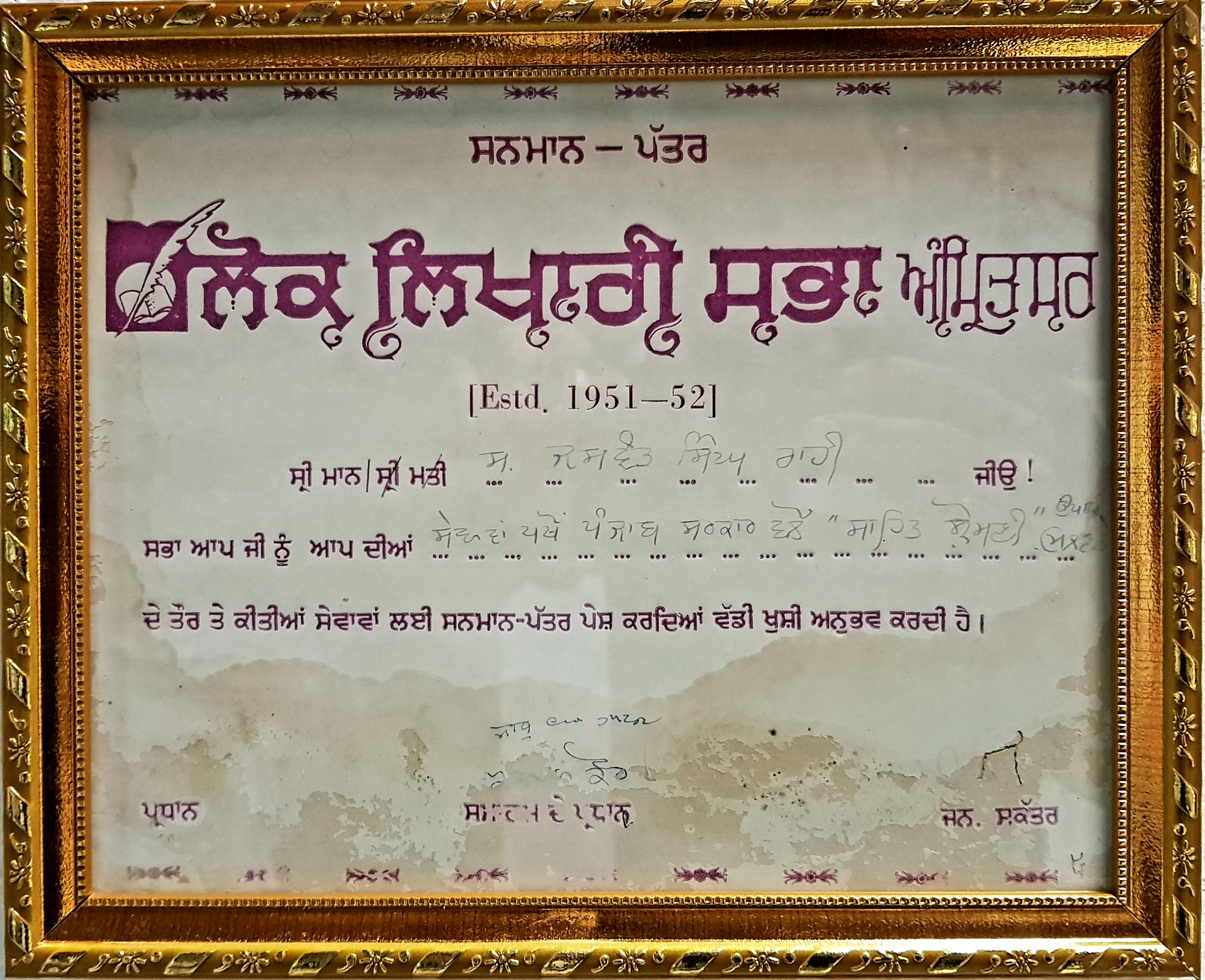
Lok Likhari Award

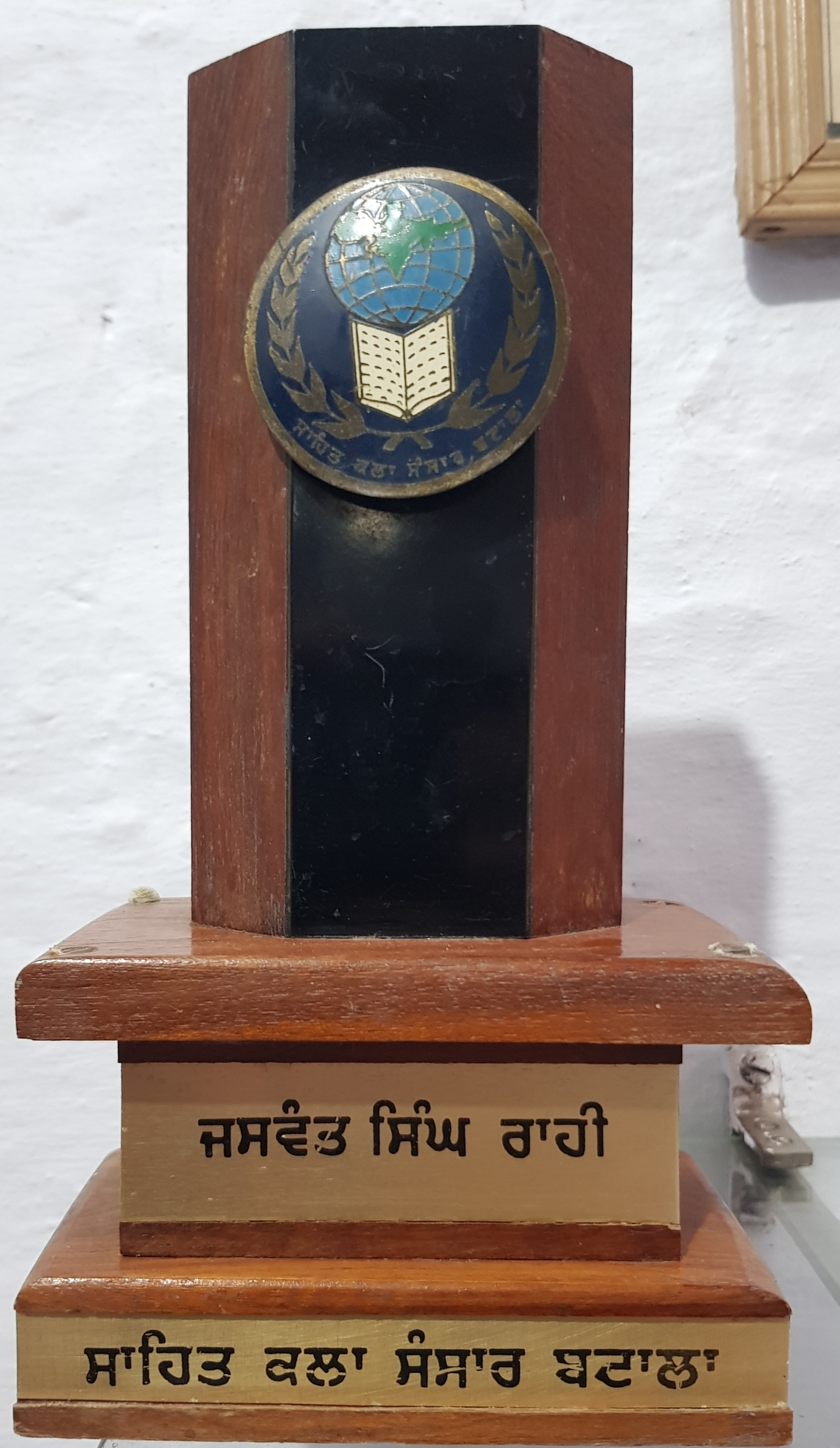
Sahit Kala Award

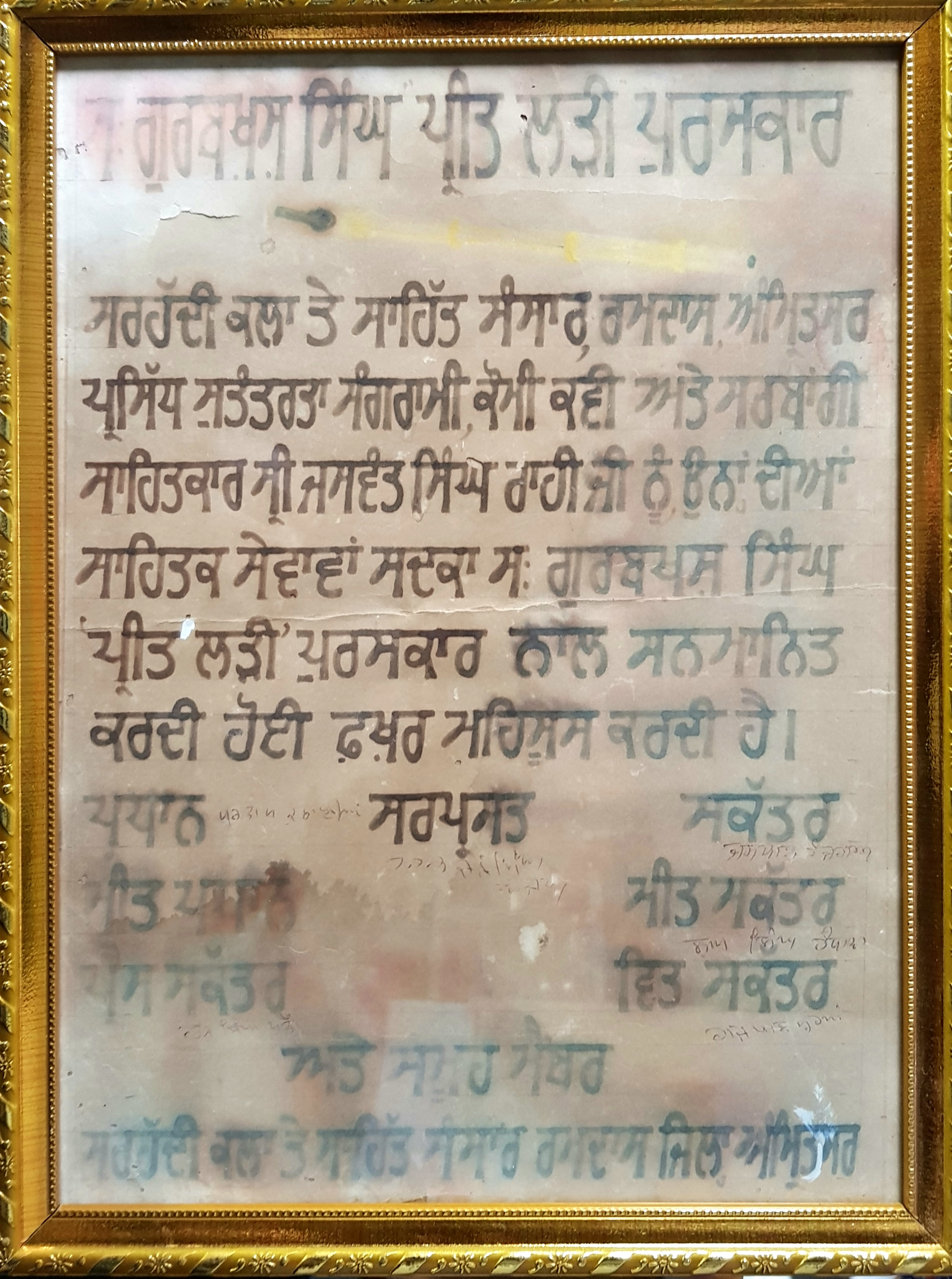
Preet Lari Puraskar

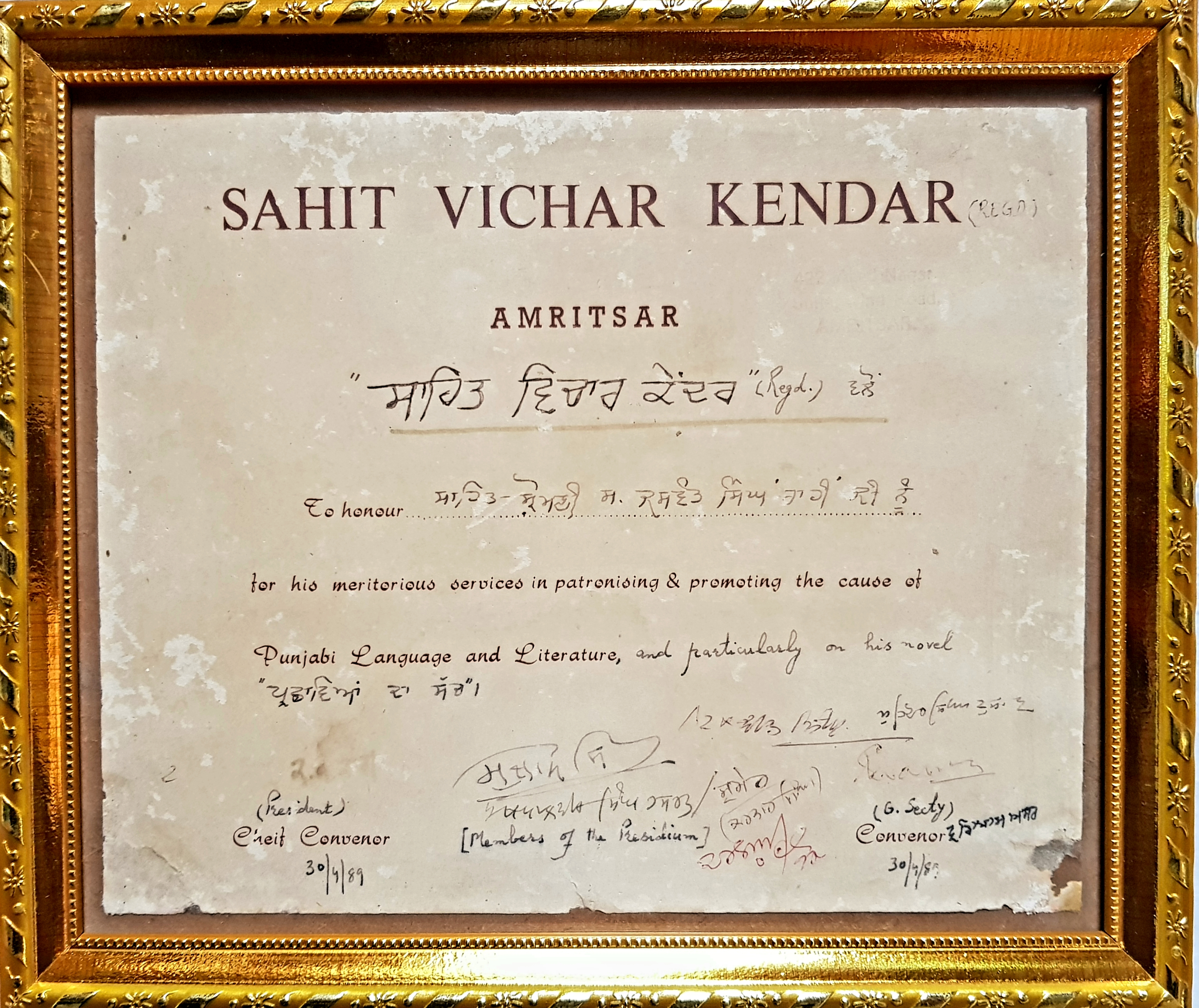
Sahit Vichar Kendar Award

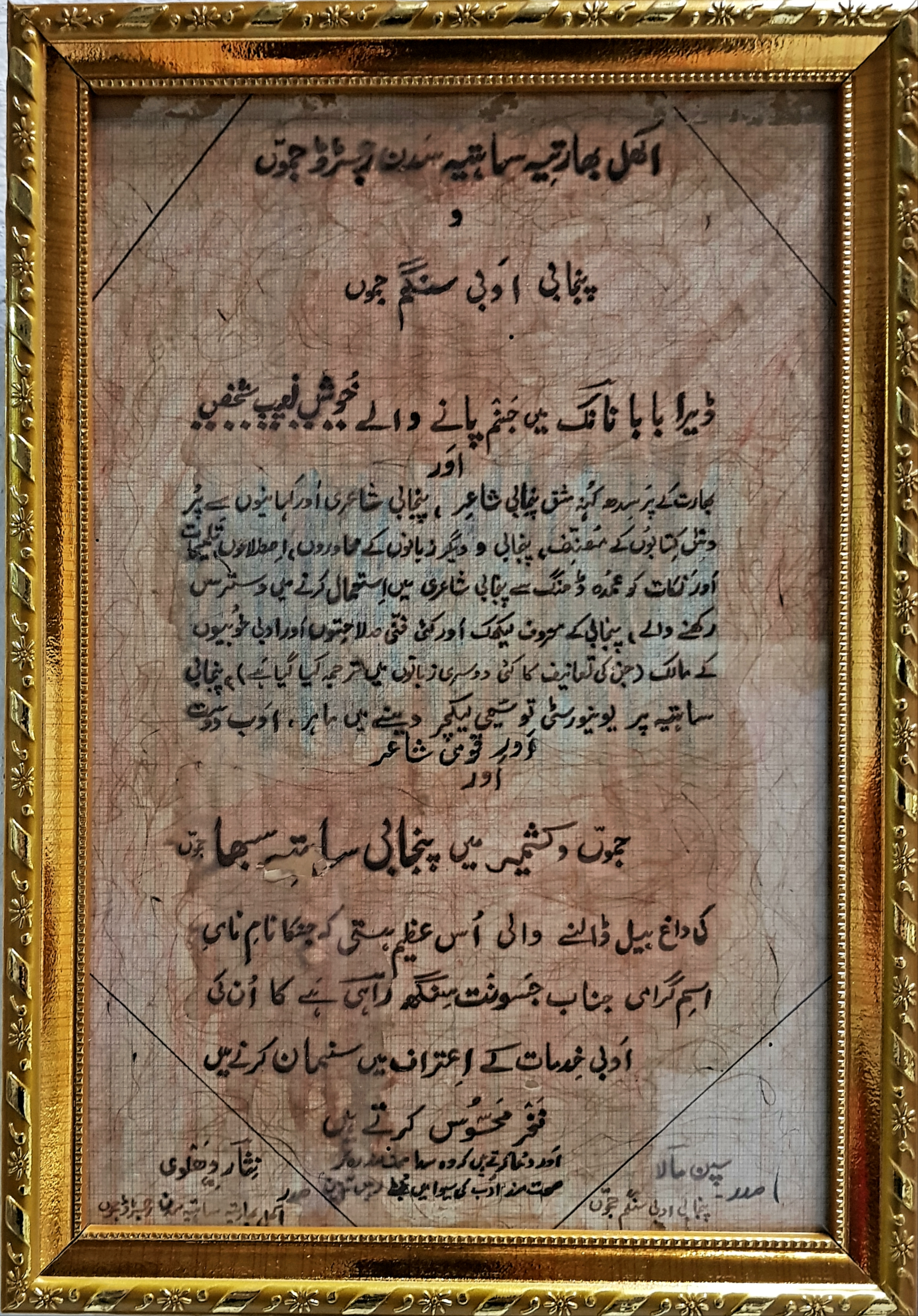
Adabi Sahitya Sangam Puraskar

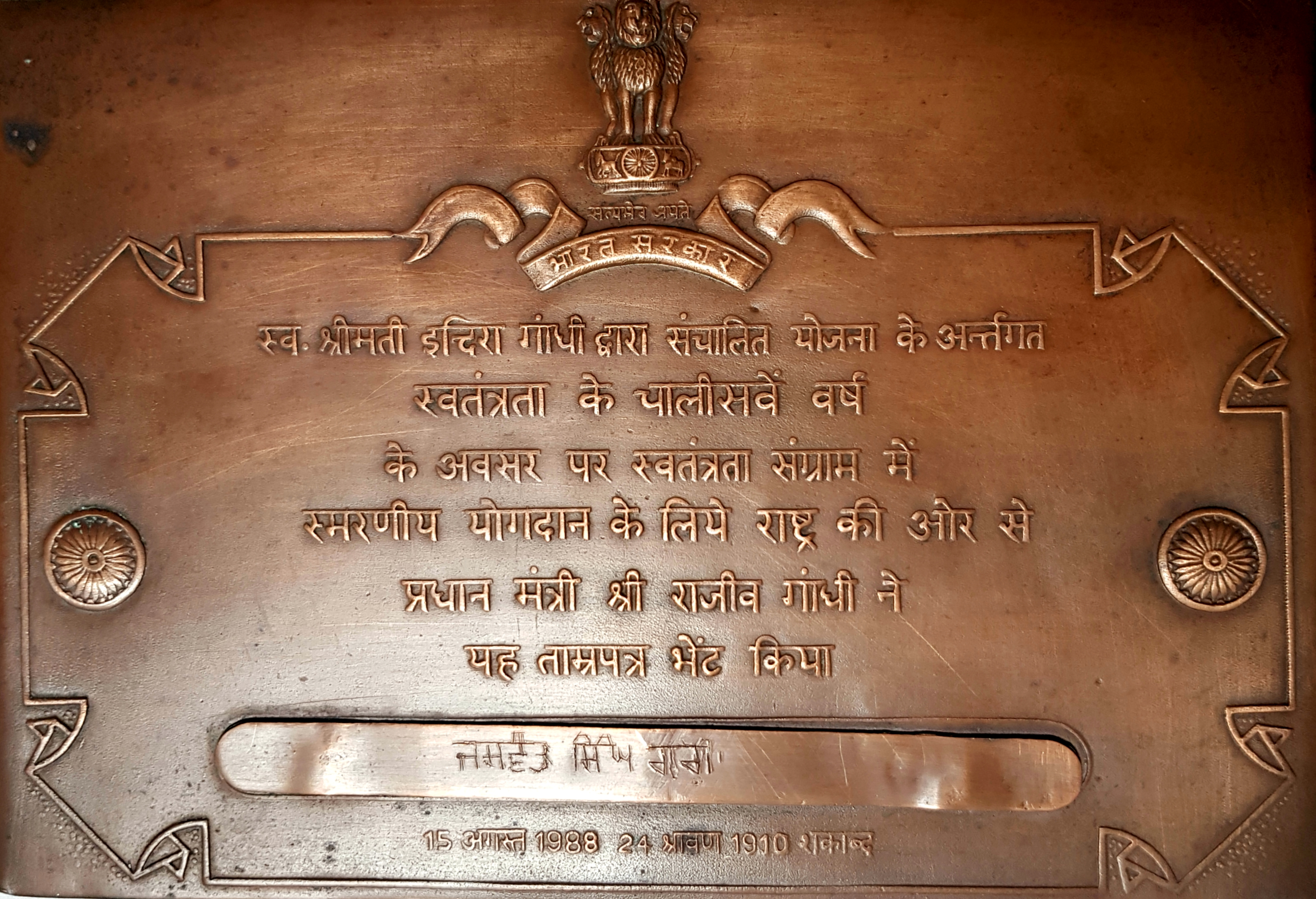
Tamra Patra by PM Rajiv Gandhi 1988

Jaswant Singh Rahi was inspired by the freedom struggle. He joined the Communist movement and at that time changed his name to Rahi. He wrote novels, poetry, and three-part autobiography entitled 'Main Kiven Jivia'. He was awarded by the Punjabi Lekhari Sabha and was also conferred with the Punjabi Sahit Shiromani Award.

== Writing style ==
Jaswant Singh Rahi is considered among the most honest and bold writers by his contemporaries and critics. Kulbir Singh Kang mentioned that Rahi has his own unique style of writing which is not influenced by any other prominent or popular author. While referring to Rahi's autobiography 'Main Kiven Jivia' Kang further mentioned that he did not make any attempt to hide or manipulate any incident irrespective of the consequences. Joginder Singh Bedi in his 1992 column entitled "Jai Mitarta – Living up to his slogan" in The Tribune (Chandigarh) has written, "In the galaxy of progressive Punjabi bards of North India, Jaswant Singh Rahi excels in composing quatrains in an unparalleled style." He further mentioned, "he has endeavoured to preach unity of godhead, brotherhood of man, secularism and above all international friendship in the context of his cherished slogan of Jai Mitarta."

As mentioned by Manpreet Kaur in her thesis, "Jaswant Singh Rahi is a writer with traditional proverbs and modern enlightenment. His poems do not represent opposition, rather revolution. (Noor, Navin Punjabi 67). He does not want replacement; he wants transformation so that the individuals may be made free from communalism, slavery and inhuman behaviour. Rahi begins his poems with the repugnancy existing between imagination and realism. The background of this repugnancy is based on the religion as corollary of social values and facing the capitalist who converts the production into capital."

== Books ==
The following are among the prominent works by Jaswant Singh Rahi:

- Lishkan (1952)
- Dojakh Di Agg (1966)
- Aades Tise Aades (1983)
- Noor Upaiya (1969)
- Jassa Singh Ramgarhia (Poetic narrative)(1970)
- Kaudian Khurmaniyan (1972)
- Sachha Jhutha-Kahani Sangrah (1975)
- Tutde Jurde Jism (1978)
- Lahoo Bhiji Chanani (1981)
- Pauna De Tarihaey (1981)
- Kabran Da Gulab (1982)
- Parchhavian da sach (1988)
- Moye phulan da mandar (1990)
- Adhoora Safar (1991)
- Main Kiven Jeeveya I, II, III (Autobiography) (1991–95)
- Dohre Rahi De (1996)
- Lahoo De Timakane (1996)

== Political influence ==
Throughout his active life, Rahi was considered among the most influential figures of the region. Prominent political personalities including Santokh Singh Randhawa, the then MLA of the constituency sought his advice on social and personal matters frequently. His correspondences regarding concerns over contemporary issues were also acknowledged by the then President of India, Giani Jail Singh. These correspondences are still preserved by the Rahi family.

== Recognition ==
Contribution of Jaswant Singh Rahi to Punjabi literature was duly recognized by contemporaries, critics and literary agencies. He has been conferred with several awards for his works, and his contributions for the freedom struggle of India. Besides various honors, he was conferred with the following prestigious awards:

- Rashtriya Kavi (National Poet) by the Government of India on 26 January 1972 for his immense contribution to Punjabi literature.
- Tamra Patra by Prime Minister Indira Gandhi.
- Tamra Patra by Prime Minister Rajiv Gandhi.
