= Santokh Singh Dhir =

Indian writer and poet

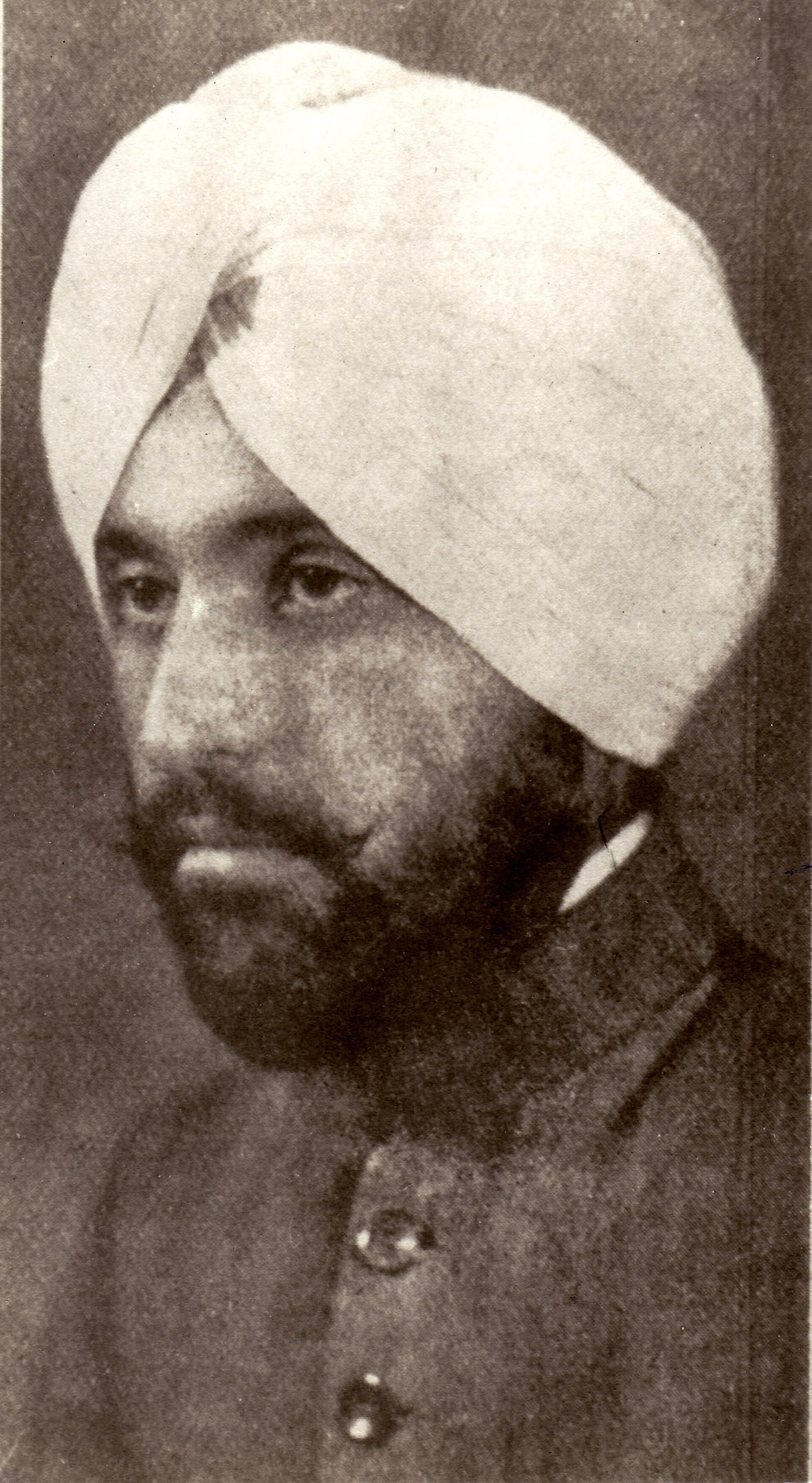
- Santokh Singh Dhir in Ludhiana in 1944
- Born: Santokh Singh; 2 December 1920; Dadheri, Punjab Province, British India
- Died: 8 February 2010 (aged 89); Chandigarh, Punjab, India
- Other name: Santokh Singh Dheer
- Occupations: Writer, poet

Santokh Singh Dhir (2 December 1920– 8 February 2010) was an Indian writer and poet who wrote in Punjabi. He was known for his stories Koee Ik Sawaar, Sanjhi Kandh and Saver Hon Tak. He was awarded the Sahitya Akademi Award for his story collection Pakhi (1991) in 1996 by the Government of India. He died on 8 February 2010.

== Life and works ==
Singh was born on 2 December 1920, to a Sikh father and Hindu mother, in a little village of Dadheri that now falls under Fatehgarh district of Indian Punjab. He first worked as a tailor and then as a journalist for Preetlarhi, a monthly magazine but was temporary. Later, he started as a full-time writer and wrote about 50 books including novels, story anthologies, poetic and an autobiography, Brahaspati (1998).

=== Family ===
His father Giani Isher Singh Dard was a poet and his mother Jamni Devi alias Gursharan Kaur was a housewife. He was married to Surinder Kaur and survived by his four daughters and a son.

== Awards ==
He received the Sahitya Akademi Award for his story collection, Pakhi (1991) in 1996. Language Department of Punjab honored him with Shromani Sahitkar Award in 1991 and Punjabi Sahit Akademi, Ludhiana awarded him the Kartar Singh Dhaliwal Sharv Sharest Award in 2002. Punjabi University, Guru Nanak Dev University and Punjabi Sahit Sabha, Delhi awarded him the life fellowships.

== Notable books ==
His noted books includes:

Poetry

- Guddian Patole (1944)
- Kaali Barchhi
- Jadon Aseen Aavange
- Pahu Phutala (1948)
- Dharti Mangdi Meenh Ve (1952)
- Patt Jharhe Purane (1955)
- To the Punjab of Farid and other poems (English Translation of Dhir's Poetry)

Story

- Koee Ik Sawaar
- Chhittian Dee Chhaven (1950)
- Saver Hon Tak (1955)
- Sanjhi Kandh (1958)
- Sharaab Da Glass (1970)
- Sheran Dee Awaz (1988)
- Pakhi (1991)

Novels

- Sharaabi (1963)
- Yaadgar (1979)
- Hindustan Hamaara
- Navaan Zamaana

== See also ==
- Sujan Singh
- Balwant Gargi
