= Sant Singh Sekhon =

Indian playwright and fiction writer

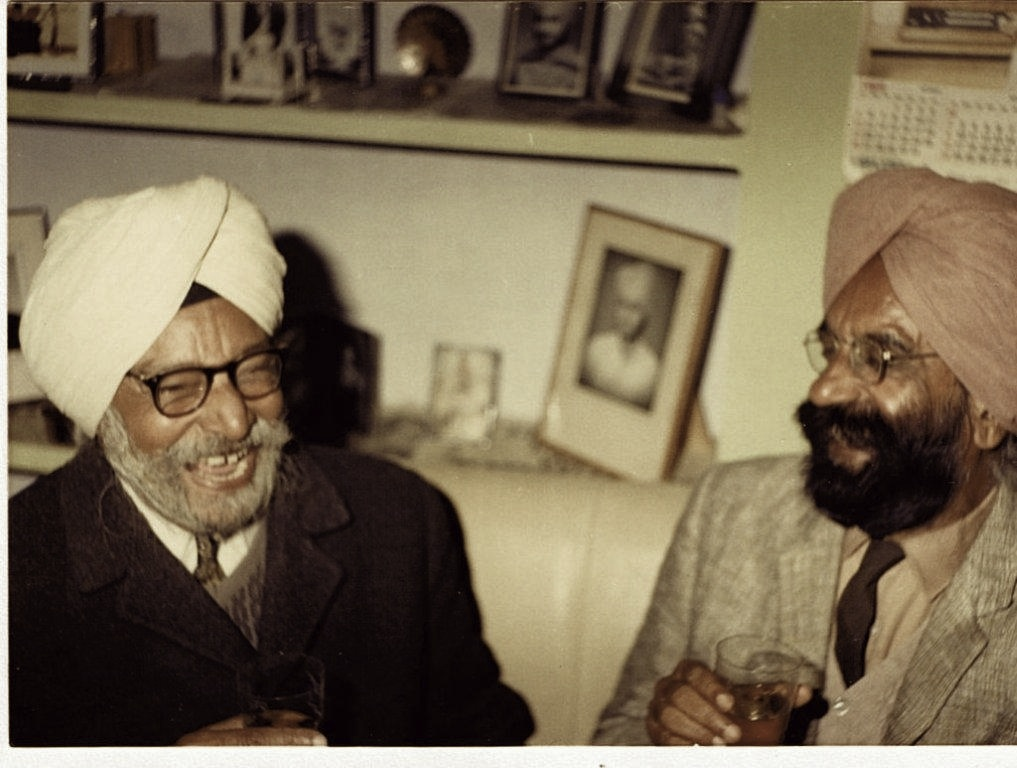
- Mohan Singh (poet) (left), Sant Singh Sekhon (right)
- Born: 1908; Lyallpur, Punjab, British India (present-day Pakistan)
- Died: 1997 (aged 88–89)
- Occupations: writer, scholar

Sant Singh Sekhon (1908–1997) was an Indian playwright and fiction writer associated with Punjabi literature. He is part of the generation of Indian authors who mark the transition of India into an independent nation, scarred by the tragedies of partition.

== Life ==
Sekhon was born in Lyallpur, Punjab, British India (present-day Pakistan), and grew up in his father's village in Dakha, near Ludhiana. His father was an idealist but introverted while his mother was more practical and religious, practicing Sikh Singh Sabha. There was considerable marital discord in the family which colours many of his stories. Sekhon eventually graduated with master's degrees in Economics and also in English. In the 1930s, he started writing in English, and after some initial publications including some in shared publications with W.H. Auden and Stephen Spender. But given the greater audience in Punjabi, he shifted to Punjabi, and initially made a mark as a playwright. Along with many South-Asian littérateurs of his generation (Faiz Ahmed Faiz, Harivansh Rai Bachchan, Buddhadev Bose), he taught English but wrote in an Indian language.

== Literary career ==
His first collection of one-act plays, Chhe Ghar (Six homes, 1941) was a critical success, particularly the play Bhavi, which unfolds a tragic cross-relationship between a king and his son with a daughter-mother.

Like his contemporary Mulk Raj Anand, Sekhon was influenced by the Progressive Writers' Movement. He was a strong believer in Marxism, and also joined the Communist party of India, though he let his membership lapse. He contested elections four times, thrice for the Punjab legislature and once for Parliament, but never won.

Much of his writing has a strong social activism message, but the questions and dilemmas facing the characters are subtly philosophical, and his plays did not see much success on stage. Subsequently, he also wrote a good bit of poetry, and also several full-length plays, mostly featuring modern themes, particularly man-woman relationships. The historical play Waris is both a love-story with the poet Waris Shah, set against the rise of Sikh power. The more contemporary Mittarpiara (beloved friend), develops on the notion of a group of Sikhs and other Indians developing a friendship with Lenin to liberate India from the British. In total, his drama corpus runs into ten full-length plays and four one-act play collections.

He also wrote five short story collections, of which Tija Pahar was very well received. Many of his stories have been translated into several languages. In addition, he also wrote two novels and five books of literary criticism, as well as several histories and translations. His scholarly works include Sahityarth, a theory of literature, and the pioneering work, Punjabi boli da itihas (History of the Punjabi language).

In 1972, he won the Sahitya Akademi Award for Mittarpiara. He was also awarded the Padma Shri, one of India's highest civilian awards, in 1987.

He was a Professor of Eminence at the Punjabi University in Patiala; after his death, a chair was set up at the university in his name.

== Works ==
One-act plays:

- Chhe Ghar (Six Homes, 1941): one-act plays - popular in Punjabi theatre.
- Tapia Kyon Khapia (Why the Ascetic Got Confused, 1950),
- Natsunehe (Dramatic Messages, 1954)
- Sundrepad (Beautiful Feet, 1956)
- Wiaholi (Bride) : verse play
- Baba bohar (Old Oak) : verse play

Full-length plays:

- Kalakar (Artist, 1945)
- Nal-Damayanti (Nala and Damayanti myth, 1960)
- Narki (Denizens of Hell, 1953) [originally written as _Eve at Bay_ in English]

Historical plays (theme of Sikh history):

- Moian Sar Na Kai (The Dead Knew It Not, 1954)
- Bera Bandh Na Sakio (Fleet They Could Not Harness, 1954)
- Waris (Inheritors, 1955)
- Banda Bahadur (1985)
- Vada Ghalughara (Holocaust 1986)
- Mittarpiara (Beloved Friend, 1971)

Novels

- Lahu Mitti (Blood and Earth).
