= Kripa Sagar =

Punjabi poet

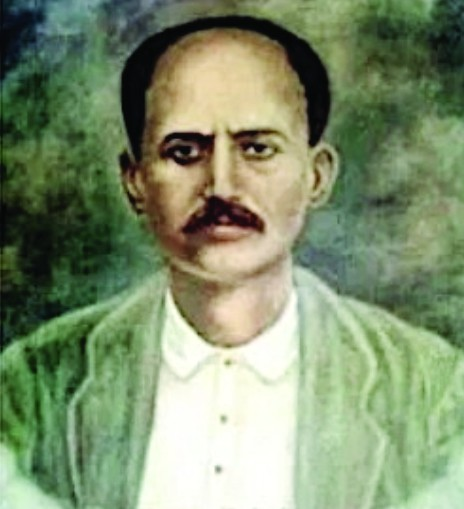
- Image of Kripa Sagar
- Born: 4 May 1875; Papnakha, British Punjab
- Died: 19 May 1939 (aged 64); Ram Gali, Lahore, Punjab
- Occupation: Poet

Kripa Sagar (1875-1939) was a Punjabi poet. He was a major figure of Punjabi literature in the late nineteenth century.

== Early life ==
Born Kripa Das on May 4 1875 in the village of Pipnakha on the outskirts of Gujranwala (now a major city in Pakistan). Kripa Sagar was successively a teacher, an editor, a banker, an officer of the University of the Punjab, and a publisher. He ran his own publishing press from Ram Gali, Lahore. He wrote poetry concurrently with these other careers.

Sagar wrote on Maharaja Ranjit Singh and the Punjab. His major works include Lakshmi Devi, "Maharaja Ranjit Singh", "Dido Jamwal", "Rai Raiyan", and Man Tarang. He succumbed to illness on May 19 1939 at Ramgali Lahore.

A "Smriti Granth", or memorial book, was prepared by Punjabi University to commemorate him, and was presented to his wife Krishna Devi on December 9, 1962 at Patiala, India.

Lakshmi Devi is inspired by "Lady of the Lake" by Walter Scott. It is interwoven with Maharaja Ranjit Singh’s conquest of the hill provinces of Bandral. He wrote it while posted in Jammu. Finished in 1915, it was first printed in 1920. He is also known for the poem "Jelum da Pani", with its subject the Jhelum River. It was written in Urdu, and was published in his collection Man Tarang.

The Amrita Kripa Sagar Cancer Hospice is named after him, as is at least one school in India.
