= Rupinderpal Singh Dhillon =

Punjabi poet

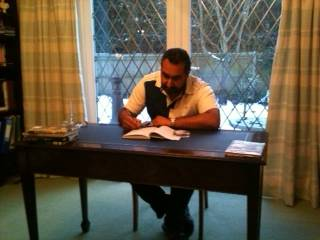
Rupinderpal Singh Dhillon at work

Rupinderpal Singh Dhillon or Roop Dhillon (Punjabi: ਰੂਪਿੰਦਰ ਸਿੰਘ ਧਿੱਲੋਨ, born 1969) is a British Punjabi writer of fiction and poetry.

== Early life and education ==
Dhillon was born in West London and initially raised in Southall. He studied at Oxford Brookes University and De Montfort University and is an accountant. He has been living in Reigate since the mid 2000s.

== Writing career ==
Originally intending to write an English novel based on the life of Maharaja Ranjit Singh in the mode of Alexandre Dumas, Dhillon became interested in writing in Punjabi after learning the Gurmukhi alphabet in his thirties. His debut novel, Neela Noor, was published in 2007. He writes in the locally spoken form of the language whose syntax is influenced by English; sometimes called 'Punglish', it had not previously been written down. His work is mainly influenced by Western literature and confronts social issues including racism, gender bias and incest. Bharind (The Hornet) is a collection of short stories and poetry. In his later novels such as the experimental gothic novel O, he employs a genre he calls Vachitarvaad, which encompasses science fiction, fantasy, horror and magical realism.

== Works ==
- Nila Noor, The Blue Light, 2007, (ISBN 978-1846855641)
- Beghar Baagh, The Homeless Leopard, 2009
- Kaldaar, The Robot, 2010
- Barcelona: Ghar Vaapasi, 2010
- Bharind - The Hornet, 2011, Lahore Publishers, Ludhiana
- O, 2015, Lokgreet Parkashan, Chandigarh
- Gunda - The Gangster, 2014, Khushjeevan Kitabaan, London
- Samurai, 2018, Gracious Books, Patiala (ISBN 978-9387276871)
