= Kulwant Singh Virk =

Punjabi author (1921-87)

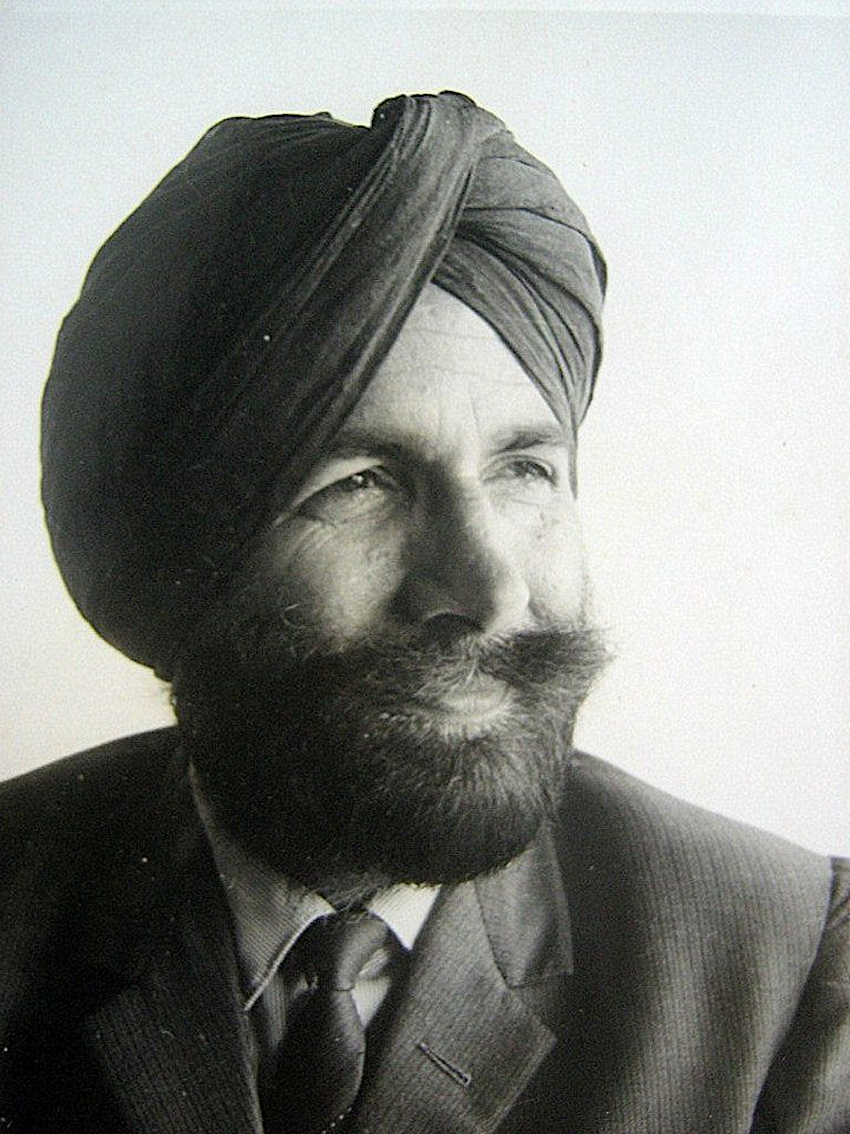
- Kulwant Singh Virk in 1960s
- Born: 20 May 1921; Village Phularwan, District Sheikhupura (Pakistan)
- Died: 24 December 1987 (aged 66); Toronto, Canada
- Occupations: Storyteller, essayist
- Writing career
- Language: Punjabi, English

Kulwant Singh Virk (20 May 1921 – 24 December 1987) was an Indian-born author who wrote mostly in Punjabi but also extensively in English. His short stories were translated into several other languages, including Russian and Japanese.

Kulwant Singh Virk was born on 20 May 1921 in the village of Phullarwan, Sheikhupura district, Punjab Province, British India.

Virk's writings have won several awards. In 1958 he won his first award for his short story compilation titled Dudh Da Chhappar (A Pond of Milk). He won the national Sahitya Academy Award in 1968 for his short story compilation Nave Lok (New Folks). He was also recognised by the Literary Forum of Canada in 1984 and acclaimed for his contribution to literature by the Punjab Sahitya Academy in 1986.

After his retirement, Virk temporarily moved to Canada but returned to Punjab after a few months. He suffered a devastating stroke in 1987 and travelled back to Canada to receive medical care. As a result, he died on 24 December 1987 in Toronto, Ontario, Canada.

== Story collection ==
- Chhah Vela (1950)
- Dhartee te Akash (1951)
- Toorhi di Pand (1954)
- Ekas ke hum baarik (1955)
- Dudh da Chhapprh (1958)
- Gola (1961)
- Virk diyan Kahaniya (1966)
- Nve Lok (1967)
- Duadashi
- Astbaazi (1984)
- Meria Saria kahanian (1986)

== Translation works ==
A Farewell to Arms (Ernest Hemingway)

== Books about Virk ==
- Kulwant Singh Virk da Kahani Sansar: Waryam Singh Sandhu
- Kahanikar Kulwant Singh Virk: Dr. Randhir Singh
- Chand and Dr. Bikram Singh Ghuman
- Kulwant Singh Virk Ik Adheyan: T.R. Vinod

== Awards ==
- Language Department Punjab (1959)
- Sahitya Akademi Award (1968)
- Honored as Shiromani Sahityakar by Department of Languages, Punjab (1985)

== Legacy ==
Many of Virk's stories have been translated into Indian and foreign languages. A book was published in Russia under the name of Dharti Henthla Balad, Dudh da Chapar, Khabal etc. were dramatized on television.
