= Harcharan Singh (writer) =

Indian dramatist and writer (1914–2006)

Punjabi Playwright
- 10 December 1914 - 12 April 2006 (age 92)
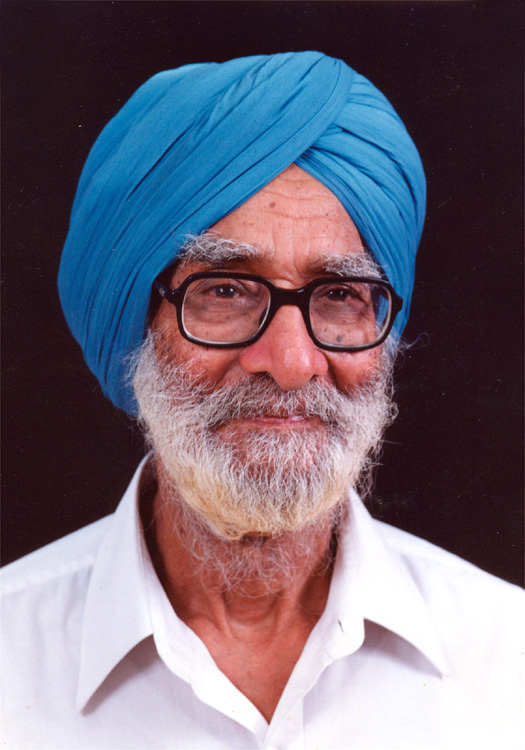
- The Man Of All Seasons

Books written
- Kal Ajj Te Bhalak (1971)
- Ratta Sallu (1953)
- Shobha Shakti (1961)
- Chamkaur Di Garhi (1966)
- Hind Di Chaddar (1975)

Married
- Dharam Kaur in 1938

Children
- Dr. Amarjit Singh Banwatt
- Jasbir Kaur Gahunia
- Jagbir Kaur Vaid
- Amrit Kaur Gahunia
- Harbux Singh Latta

Dr. Harcharan Singh (1914–2006) was an Indian dramatist and writer in the Punjabi language. He dedicated 69 years of his life to Punjabi theater, in which he authored 51 books and staged numerous plays all over the world.

== Life ==
Singh was born in 1914 at Chak # 576, near Nankana Sahib (now in Pakistan) to father, Kirpa Singh, and mother, Rakkhi. He was sent to his ancestral village, Urapar in Jalandhar District, for education. After passing class 8th from the Govt. School, Chakdanna, Singh was sent to Khalsa School, Jalandhar, for Matric (Class 10). Singh enrolled in B.A. at Khalsa College, Amritsar in 1933. Then he obtained his master's degree in Punjabi and history from FC College Lahore. Moreover, he earned his Ph.D. degree in orientalism and oriental history, with particular emphasis on classical, pre-Maurya Indo-Aryan dynasties of the Punjab and Himalayas for his thesis "Theatre Traditions in Punjab" from Delhi University in 1943.

He was the head of Punjabi Dept., Punjabi University, Patiala, for 10 years, from 1965 to 1975. He held the post of chairman at the Punjab Sangeet Natak Academy from 1982 to 1991 and again from 1994 to 1997. He was then appointed the chairman of Punjab Arts Council, Chandigarh, from 1999 to 2002.

== Writing ==
Singh wrote his first play, Kamla Kumari, in 1937, which was first staged in Amritsar on 21 January 1938. He established the Punjab Art Theatre at Lahore in 1939 and popularized theatrical activities in Punjab. He initiated a trend in Punjabi theatre with his wife Dharam Kaur, who dared to act female role in his play Anjorh, staged at YMCA Hall Lahore in 1939. This paved the way for women on Punjabi stage.

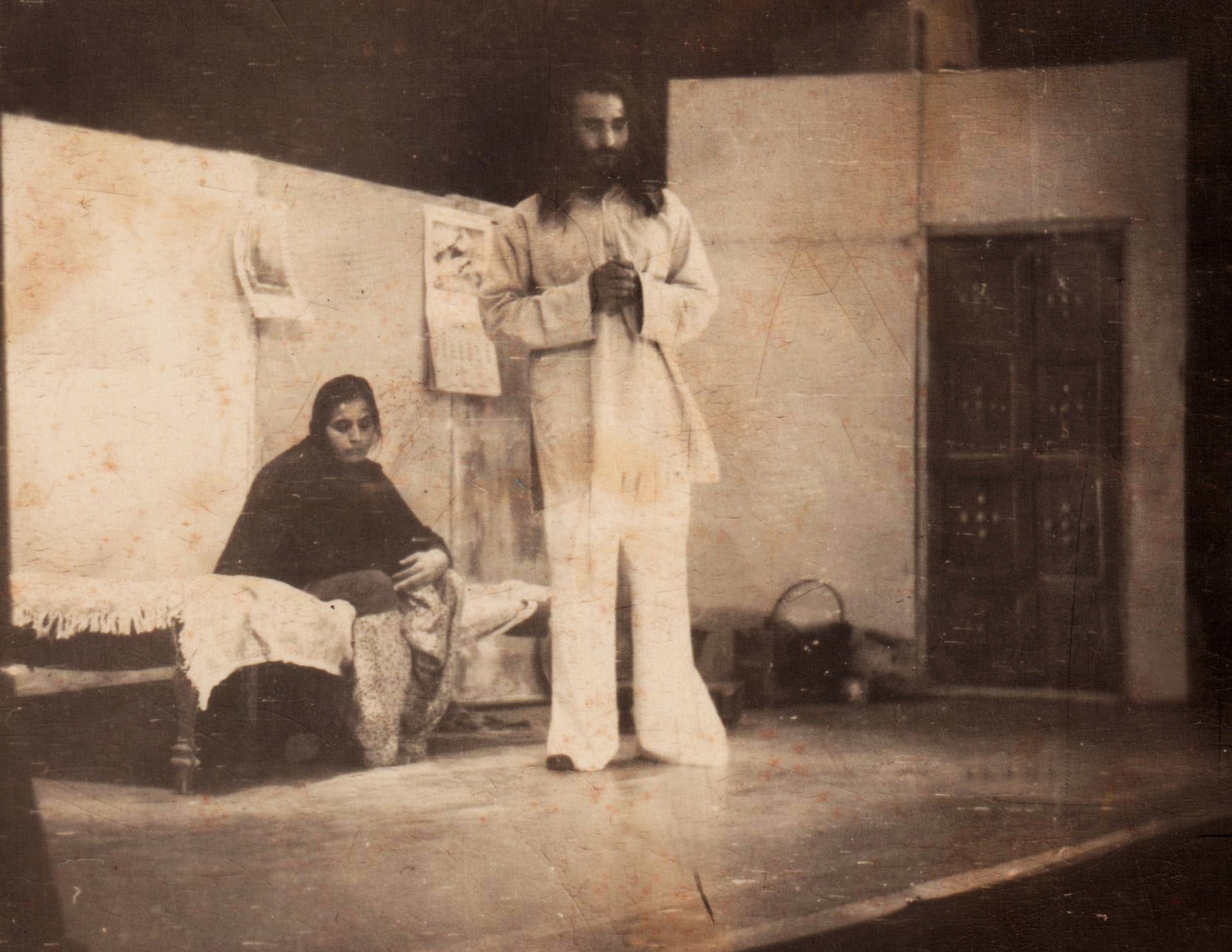
Anjorh 1941

Singh authored 51 books in Punjabi. He was an authority on Sikh historical plays. His well-known historical plays are Chamkaur Di Garhi, Punian Da Chan, Miti Dhundh Jag Chanan Hoa, Jafarnama, Sarhand Di Kandh, Hind Di Chadar, Rani Jindan, Kama Gata Maru and Shubh Karman Te Kabh Hoon Na Taron. The play Chamkaur Di Garhi was first staged on the occasion of the tercentenary birth celebration of Shri Guru Gobind Singh at famous Sunmukh Nanda Auditorium, Bombay, in December 1966. For the last 38 years, different theatrical groups have been staging this play in India and abroad. Six of his plays have been translated into Hindi and one into Russian.

About a dozen of his books have won awards. He was given the prestigious Sahitya Academy Award in 1973 for his play Kal Aj Te Bhalak (Yesterday, Today and Tomorrow). He was honored by Punjab Govt. as Shromani Sahitkar in 1974. Besides these decorations he was honored by more than a dozen national and international institutions. The feature film Sarbansdani Guru Gobind Singh was based on his famous play Chamkaur Di Garhi. His historical play Rani Jindan was performed by Punjabi Kala Kendra Chandigarh in 20 big cities of Canada and the US in 1981.

Singh wrote the scripts of Bole So Nihal, (a world-famous multimedia Sight & Sound Panorama on 500 years of Sikh History, specially produced for the Birth of Khalsa celebrations,) Sher-e-Punjab (a multimedia Sight & Sound Panorama on 40 glorious years of Khalsa Raj) and Guru Maneo Granth, (another mega multi-media sight & sound panorama dedicated to the 400th centenary of the Prakash of Sri Guru Granth Sahib). These shows have been shown in 50 cities of Punjab and India besides in 54 major cities of the US, Canada and UK since 1999.

== List of books ==
| No. | First published in | Book title | Publisher | ISBN |
|---|---|---|---|---|
| 1 | 1937 | Kamla Kumari | Self Published | NA |
| 2 | 1938 | Raja Porus | Self Published | NA |
| 3 | 1939 | Dur Durade Shahron | Lahore Book Shop, Ludhiana | NA |
| 4 | 1941 | Anjorh | NA | NA |
| 5 | 1943 | Khedan De Din Chaar | NA | NA |
| 6 | 1949 | Dosh | Punjabi Publisher, New Delhi | NA |
| 7 | 1953 | Ratta Sallu | Aarsi Publishers, New Delhi | NA |
| 8 | 1954 | Tera Ghar So Mera Ghar | Sundar Pustak Bhandhar, New Delhi | NA |
| 9 | 1955 | Punia Da Chan | Punjabi Publishers, New Delhi | NA |
| 10 | 1961 | Shobha Shakti | Aarsi Publishers, New Delhi | NA |
| 11 | 1966 | Chamkaur Di Garhi | Singh Brothers, Amritsar | NA |
| 12 | 1969 | Mitti Dhundh Jag Chanan Hoa | Singh Brothers, Amritsar | NA |
| 13 | 1971 | Kal Ajj Te Bhalak | Navyug Publishers, New Delhi | NA |
| 14 | 1973 | Lehande Da Noor (Poetic Drama) | Punjabi Pyare Publisher, Chandigarh | NA |
| 15 | 1974 | Samaaj De Tham | NA | NA |
| 16 | 1975 | Hind Di Chaddar | Lahore Book Shop, Ludhiana | NA |
| 17 | 1977 | Dekh Kabira Roya | Singh Brothers, Amritsar | NA |
| 18 | 1979 | Sahit Te Sabhyachar De Ambar Tare | Aarsi Publishers, New Delhi | NA |
| 19 | 1980 | Maseeha Suli Te Muskuraya | Lahore Book Shop, Ludhiana | NA |
| 20 | 1981 | Rani Jindhan | Aarsi Publishers, New Delhi | NA |
| 21 | 1983 | Kamagata Maru | Raghbir Rachna Publishers, Chandigarh | NA |
| 22 | 1984 | Ambar Kala | NA | NA |
| 23 | 1989 | Aag Bujao | Singh Brothers, Amritsar | NA |
| 24 | 1992 | Shubh Karman Te Kabhu Na Tro | Singh Brothers, Amritsar | 81-7205-090-9 |
| 25 | 1995 | Mitti Puche Ghumiar Toh | Navyug Publishers, New Delhi | 81-86216-70-7 |
| 26 | 2004 | Guru Maneo Granth | NA | NA |
| 27 | 2005 | Jene Lahor Nahin Dekhea (Stories) | Tarlochan Publishers, Chandigarh | 81-7914-120-9 |
| 28 | 2006 | Udhala (Stories) | Tarlochan Publishers, Chandigarh | 81-7914-135-7 |
| 29 | 1960 | Murkhe Di Khusboo (One Act Play) | Ludhiana Book Shop, Ludhiana | NA |
| 30 | NA | Marhian Di Puja | NA | NA |
| 31 | NA | Khet De Baney | NA | NA |
| 32 | 1997 | Baapu Di Ghorhi | Punjabi University, Patiala | 81-7380-262-9 |
| 33 | NA | Kanchan Matti | NA | NA |
| 34 | 1972 | Zafarnama (One Act Play) | Singh Brothers, Amritsar | 81-7205-104-2 |
| 35 | NA | Sirhand Di Kand | NA | NA |
| 36 | 1940 | Jeevan Leela | Lahore Book Shop, Ludhiana | NA |
| 37 | 1943 | Sipiyan (Stories) | Punjabi Publishers, New Delhi | NA |
| 38 | 1957 | Meri Chonvi Ikangi | Sundar Pustak Bhandar, New Delhi | NA |
| 39 | 1979 | Che Rang (Collection of One Act Plays) | Singh Brothers, Amritsar | NA |
| 40 | 1944 | Panj Geetrha | P.S. Datta, Lahore | NA |
| 41 | 1942 | Sapt Rishi (Collection of One Act Plays) | Lahore Book Shop, Lahore | NA |
| 42 | 1989 | Meri Pratinidh Rachna | Punjabi University, Patiala | NA |
| 43 | 1988 | Meri Sahitik Save-Keevni | Punjabi University, Patiala | NA |
| 44 | 1979 | Natak Kala Te Mera Anubhav | Language Dept. Govt of Punjab | NA |
| 45 | 1964 | Punjabi Sahit Dhara | Surjit Book Depot, New Delhi | NA |
| 46 | 1977 | Meri Chonvi Kahaniyan | Lahore Book Shop, Ludhiana | NA |
| 47 | NA | Naat Kala Te Hor Lekh | Pepsu Book Depot, Patiala | NA |
| 48 | 1971 | Eshwar Chandan Nanda | Punjabi University, Patiala | NA |
| 49 | 1972 | Punjabi Vartak Da Janam Te Vikas | Pepsu Book Depot, Patiala | NA |
| 50 | 1949 | Sanjha Raaj (Collection of One Act Plays) | Lahore Book Shop, Ludhiana | NA |
| 51 | 1955 | Navi Saver | Punjabi Publishers, New Delhi | NA |
