= Lopoke =

- Location within Pakistan
- Coordinates: 31.08°N 72.50°E
- Country: Pakistan
- Province: Punjab
- Elevation: 166 m (545 ft)
- Time zone: UTC+5 (PST)

Lopoke is a village in the Punjab province of Pakistan. It is located at 31°8'0N 72°50'0E with an altitude of 166 metres (547 feet).
