= Dhani Ram Chatrik =

Indian poet and typographer (1876–1954)

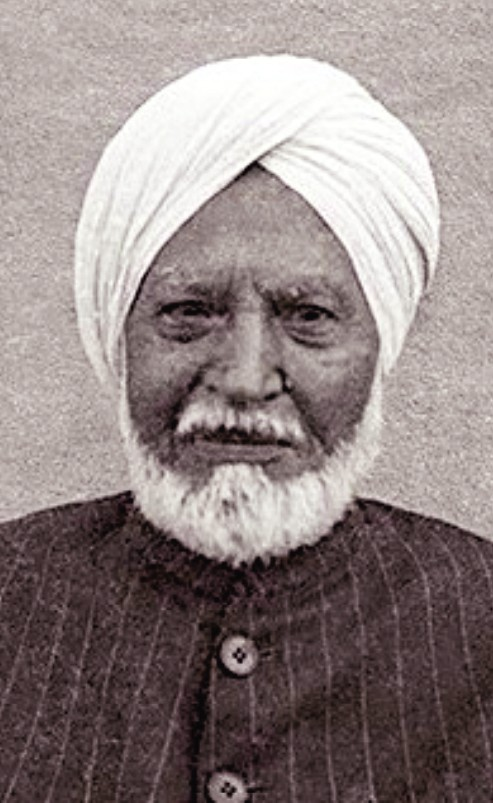
- Portrait of Dhani Ram Chatrik
- Born: 4 October 1876; Sheikhupura, Punjab Province, British India
- Died: 18 December 1954 (aged 78)
- Education: Lopoke, Badonialli and Islamia school, Amritsar
- Writing career
- Language: Punjabi

Dhani Ram Chatrik (4 October 1876 – 18 December 1954) was an Indian poet and typographer.

He is considered one of the pioneers of modern Punjabi poetry. He promoted Punjabi culture, language and publications through his life. In 1926, he became the President of Punjabi Sahit Sabha, a Punjabi Literary Society.

== Early life ==
He was born in village Pasian-wala, district Sheikhupura (now in Pakistan). His father Pohu Lal, was an ordinary shopkeeper. His father moved to village Lopoke in search for work. His father taught him Gurmukhi and Urdu scripts. Dhaniram grew fond of calligraphy and went to Bombay to learn Gurmukhi typography. Though a Hindu by birth, he became an admirer of the Sikh faith after he came in contact with the major Punjabi poet of that era Bhai Vir Singh. After this meeting he felt inspired to write verses in the Punjabi Language.

== Partial bibliography ==
- Chatrik authored Fullan Di Tokri (1904)
- Bharthri Hari Bikramajit (1905)
- Nal Dmaayanti (1906)
- Dharmvir (1912)
- Chandanwari (1931)
- Kesar Kiari (1940)
- Nawan Jahan (1942)
- Noor Jahan Badshahbeghum (1944)
- Sufikhana (1950)
