= Akali Kaur Singh =

Sikh scholar (1886-1953)

Akali Kaur Singh Nihang
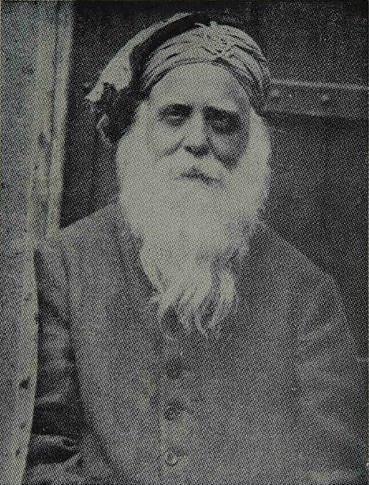
- Portrait photograph of Akali Kaur Singh in his later years
- Born: Puran Singh; 28 February 1886; Chakkar village, Muzzafarabad district, Kashmir
- Died: 23 January 1953 (aged 66)
- Known for: Sikh literati and theologian

Akali Kaur Singh (28 February 1886 – 23 January 1953) was a religious preacher and Sikh scholar.

== Biography ==
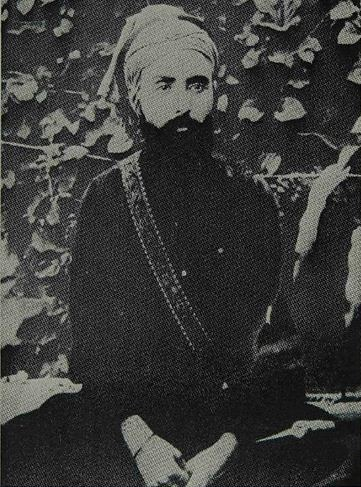
Photograph of Kaur Singh in his youth

He was born on 28 February 1886 as Puran Singh, son of Mahan Singh and Malkaram Kaur of Village Paddhar, Chakar, in Jammu and Kashmir. Kaur Singh studied Sikh scriptural texts, Sanskrit, Braj and Ayurveda under Bava Mahari Singh. In 1904, he became student of Giani Bagh Singh, a well known scholar of Peshawar. He used to take part in Arya Samaj Debates. He turn Nihang and renamed as Kaur singh at Hazoor Sahib, Nanded.

He preached the message of guru during his travels throughout India and Afghanistan.

=== Work ===
He worked on alphabetical index of Guru Granth Sahib in 1907, and completed it in 1920. In March 1923, it was published under title Guru Shabad Ratan Prakash/Tuk Tatkara and also worked on an index of Bhai Gurdas's work in 1929. He preached message of Gurus in Chakar and opened chain of schools, set up library and published bullietn called Ashram Samachar. His works include Sri Gur Sobha (1925), Kavi Senapati, Gutka Pramanik Nitnem, Buddhibaridh Hitopadesh Ratnakar(Panchtantra in Gurmukhi), Sukh Sagararihat Gharaa Vaid(Ayurveda), Istri Sankat mochan (Women upliftment).

=== Death ===
In 1952, he suffered from a heart attack and died on 23 January 1953.

== Bibliography ==
- Guru Shabad Ratan Prakash/Tuk Tatkara (1923) - an alphabetical index of the entire text of the Guru Granth Sahib.
- Loh Prakāsh (1925) - an exegesis of the Sarbloh Granth by Hazura Singh of Takht Hazur Sahib, foreword written by Kaur Singh.
