= Papnakha =

Pakistani village

Coordinates: 32°10′N 74°04′E

Papnakha a village in Gujranwala District, located approximately 5 kilometres west of Gujranwala in the province of Punjab, Pakistan. It is situated at 32°10'10"N latitude and 74°03'49"E longitude, at an elevation of approximately 252 metres above sea level. Administratively, Papnakha forms part of the rural council structure within Gujranwala District. The village is served by a post office operating under the jurisdiction of the Gujranwala General Post Office (GPO).

Public services in the village include a Basic Health Unit (BHU), which provides primary healthcare facilities to the local population.
