= Bawa Balwant =

Punjabi poet and writer

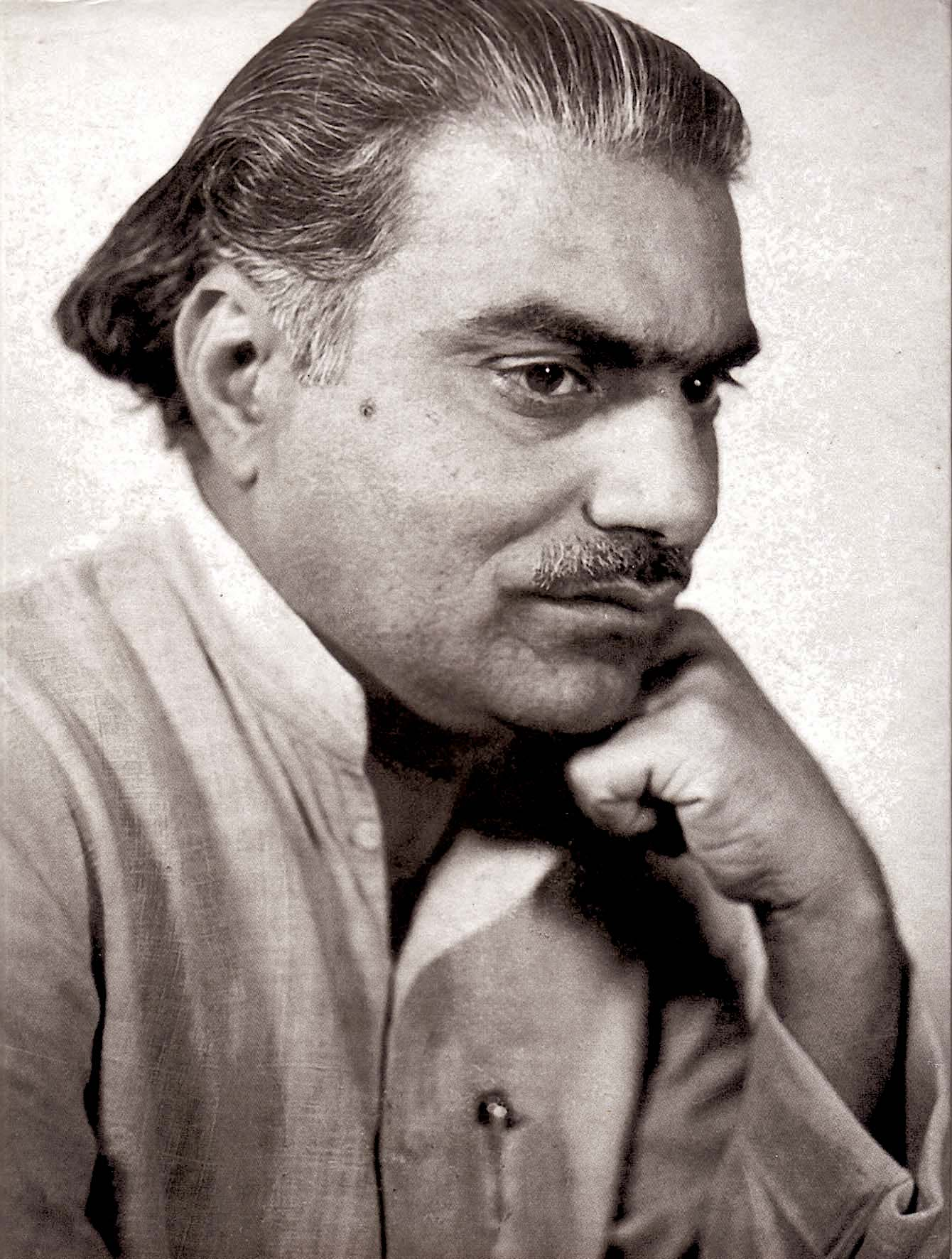
- Bawa Balwant in 1950s
- Born: August 1915; Neshta (now Amritsar district), British Punjab
- Died: June 1972 (aged 56–57); New Delhi, India
- Other name: Bava Balwant
- Occupations: Poet, Writer
- Known for: Poetry

Mangal Sen (1915–1972) was a Punjabi writer, poet and essayist in East Punjab, India. He wrote first under the name Balwant Rai, but is most famous for his poetry under his pen name Bawa Balwant. He started writing poetry in Urdu but later switched to his mother tongue of Punjabi. Balwant is credited with helping start the progressive movement in Punjabi poetry. He also made a contribution to the freedom struggle of India.

== Early life ==
Mangal Sen was born in August 1915 to a middle-class family, in the ancient village of Neshta in the Indian Punjab. Neshta (Punjabi: ਨੇਸ਼ਟਾ) is near Wagah border and now falls under the Amritsar district He received his primary education from his father, Thakur Dina Nath, and learned Hindi, Urdu and Sanskrit. He got a job in Amritsar where he developed a passion for music. He was heavily influenced by the Urdu poet Muhammad Iqbal.

His father, Thakur Dina Nath, was a hakeem (English:desi doctor). He had two brothers and two sisters. His brothers was unmarried while his marriage was followed by a quick separation. Sujan Singh, a noted story writer of Punjab, was one of his close friends.

== Literary works ==
Greatly influenced by Mohammad Iqbal, he started writing Urdu poetry and later switched over to his mother tongue, Punjabi. His first book in Urdu, Sher-E-Hind, was banned by the British administration. His poetic collections include Amar Geet, Maha Nach, Jwalamukhi, Sugand-Sameer and Bandergah. He published one essay collection, Kis Taraan De Naach.

== Legacy ==
He died due to the heat of June in 1972 in New Delhi. Today, except his literal works, nothing belonging to him is traceable. Neshta, the Punjab's most ancient village lies neglected with his house ruined. His two sisters are unknown. Nobody knows where they live.
