= Karnail Singh Somal =

Indian writer

Dr. Karnail Singh Somal
- Karnail Singh Somal
- Born: 28 September 1940; Village Kalaur, District Fatehgarh Sahib (erstwhile in District. Patiala), Punjab
- Occupations: Author, poet, Educationist, Researcher
- Writing career
- Pen name: Karnail Singh
- Language: Punjabi
- Period: 1975–present
- Genres: Prose, Children's stories and poems
- Subjects: Life, philosophy, Education, Social Issues
- Notable works: Bhai Ditt Singh Giani-Jeevan, Rachna Te Shaksiat (2003)

Karnail Singh Somal is a well known Punjabi prose-writer. He is recipient of the prestigious Sahitya Akademi Award (Bal Sahitya Puraskar 2020 for his book in Punjabi 'Phoolaan da shehar').

== Biography ==
He was born in village Kalour, District Fatehgarh Sahib (erstwhile in District. Patiala), Punjab, on 28 September 1940, as per school record. However, as per his mother, he was born in the early morning of Maghi, first day of the month of Magh. His father's name is Prem Singh and mother's name is Surjeet Kaur.

== Education ==
He got his early education in his village school. He matriculated from Govt. High School Bassi Pathana in 1958. Because of financial difficulties, he could not continue his education further, he got a petty job. However, his yearning for education led him to pursue his studies privately. He did his M.A. in Punjabi(standing third in the university) and M.A. in Hindi. Later on he got his PhD from Punjab University. The topic of his thesis was "A Study of Free Verse in Punjabi (up to 1950)".

== Service ==
As he had done O.T. and BEd, so he started working as a school teacher. Thereafter, he joined Punjab School Education Board as Language Expert. About two years later he was selected as Assistant Director in Punjabi Teaching And Research Section of the Board. There his main contribution was in writing and editing Punjabi text-books. He retired from that post in September 1998.

== Personal life ==
He married Salinder Kaur in 1966. They have two daughters- Manpreet Kaur (1969) and Jagpreet Kaur(1973).

== Works ==
He has been writing for leading Punjabi newspapers for more than 35 years. He wrote literary essays, contributed to various Punjabi newspapers and journals. He wrote stories and poems for children. He did research work on Bhai Ditt Singh Giani.

=== Prose books ===
- Punjabi: ਜ਼ਿੰਦਗੀ ਉਤਸਵ ਹੈ, romanized: Zindagi Utsav Hai, lit. 'Life is a Celebration', 1998
- ਜੀਵਨ ਜੁਗਤਾਂ ਦੀ ਤਲਾਸ਼, Jeevan Jugtan Di Talash, 'Search for Life Strategies', 2001
- ਜਿਉਣਾ ਆਪਣੀ ਮੌਜ ਵਿਚ, Jiuna Apni Mauj Vich, 'Living in One's own Joy', 2004
- ਨਿੱਤ ਚੜਦੈ ਨਵੇਂ ਸਾਲ ਦਾ ਸੂਰਜ, Nitt Chardhai Naven Saal Da Sooraj, 'Every Day is a New Year's Day', 2004
- ਫੁਰਸਤ ਦੇ ਪਲ, Fursat De Pal, 'Leisure Moments' 2007,
- ਕਲਾਮਈ ਜੀਵਨ ਦੀ ਤਾਂਘ, Kalamaee Jiwan Di Taangh, 'Longing for An Artistic Life', 2009
- ਸਾਡੇ ਅੰਬਰਾਂ ਦੇ ਤਾਰੇ, Saade Ambaraan De Taare, 'Stars in the Sky of Our Life', 2011

=== Research ===
Since very young age, the author was inspired by Bhai Ditt Singh Giani, Singh Sabha fame scholar, who was also born in village Kalaur. After a lot of research, the author wrote a book on this legendary writer, speaker, reformer, journalist and editor. The name of the book is "ਭਾਈ ਦਿੱਤ ਸਿੰਘ ਗਿਆਨੀ – ਜੀਵਨ ਰਚਨਾ ਤੇ ਸ਼ਖਸੀਅਤ (Bhai Ditt Singh Giani-Jeevan, Rachna Te Shaksiat )" ( 2003). Its revised edition was Published by Singh Brothers Amritsar in 2005.

=== Children's literature ===
He writes for children regularly. He started writing for his grand-daughters living in Canada and used to email stories and poems to them. He has penned more than two dozen books. He writes for the magazines published by the Punjab School Education Board – ਪੰਖੜੀਆਂ, ਪਰਾਈਮਰੀ ਸਿਖਿਆ (Pankhrian, Primary Sikhia). Besides he wrote four books for school students, two grammar books and two essay books.

- Punjabi: ਹਿਰਨਾਂ ਦੀ ਡਾਰ, romanized: Hirnaan di Daar, lit. 'Herd of Deer' 2006
- ਕੀੜੀ ਦਾ ਆਟਾ ਡੁਲ ਗਿਆ, Kiri Da Aata Dull Gaya, 'The Ant Spilled her Flour', 2006
- ਜਦੋਂ ਦਾਦਾ ਜੀ ਭੂਤ ਬਣ ਗਏ, Jadon Daada Ji Bhoot Ban Gaye, 'When Grandfather Turned into a Ghost', 2006
- ਸੁਨਹਿਰੀ ਹਿਰਨ, Sunehri Hiran, 'The Golden Deer', 2007
- ਸ਼ੇਰ ਉਪਕਾਰ ਨਾ ਭੁਲਿਆ, Sher upkaar na bhuleya, 'The Lion Didn't Forget the Favour', 2007
- ਲੇਲਾ ਨਾਨਕੇ ਗਿਆ, Lela Naanke Gaya, 'The Kid Goat Went to Grandparents', 2007
- ਅਕ੍ਲਮੰਦ ਲੰਗੂਰ, Akalmand Langoor, 'The Wise Monkey', 2007
- ਚੂਹੇ ਤੇ ਬਿੱਲੀ ਦੀ ਦੌੜ, Choohe Te Billi Di Daur, 'The Race between Mouse and Cat', 2007
- ਸੋਨੇ ਦਾ ਆਂਡਾ ਦੇਣ ਵਾਲੀ ਮੁਰਗੀ, Sone da Aanda Den Vaali Murgi, 'The Hen who Laid Golden Eggs', 2007
- ਬਿੱਲੀ ਦੇ ਬ੍ਲੂੰਘੜੇ, Billi De Balunghre, 'The Cat's Kitten', 2007
- ਘੋੜੇ ਨੂੰ ਨਿਆਂ, Ghore nu Nian, 'Justice to the Horse', 2007
- ਵੇ ਤੋਤਿਆ ਮਨਮੋਤਿਆ, Ve Toteya Manmoteya, 'O Parrot!', 2007
- ਸਿਆਣਾ ਕਬੂਤਰ, Siana Kabootar, 'The Wise Pigeon', 2007
- ਚਿੜੀ ਤੇ ਕਾਂ ਨੇ ਖਿਚੜੀ ਰਿੰਨੀ, Chiri te Kaan ne Khichri Rinni, 'The Sparrow and the Crow Cooked Rice' 2007
- ਕਿੰਨੀ ਸੋਹਣੀ ਵੇਖ ਸਵੇਰ, Kinni Sohni Vekh Saver, 'Look! How Beautiful is the Morning' 2007
- ਵਾਹ ਬਈ ਕਮਾਲ, Wah Bhai Kamaal, 'Wow, Incredible!'2008
- ਇਸ ਘੋੜੇ ਦੀਆਂ ਵਾਗਾਂ ਫੜੋ, Is Ghore Diyaan Wagaan Faro, 'Hold this Horse's Bridle'008
- ਸੋਹਣੇ ਸ਼ੌਕ ਦਾ ਮੁੱਲ ਕੋਈ ਨਾ, Sohne Shauk da Mull Koi Na, 'A Good Hobby is Priceless' 2008
- ਸੁਣੋ ਕਹਾਣੀ (ਨਵੇਂ ਦਿਸਹਦੇ), Suno Kahani, 'Hear This Tale' 2009
- ਸਿਖ੍ਹੀ ਸੰਥਾਵਲੀ ਭਾਗ 1-4, Sikhi Santhavali Bhag 1-4, 'Vignettes of Sikh Faith Parts 1-4', 2009

=== Works for students ===
- Punjabi: ਨਿਵੇਕਲੇ ਪੰਜਾਬੀ ਲੇਖ ਸੀਨੀਅਰ ਸ਼੍ਰੇਣੀਆਂ ਲਈ, romanized: Nivekle Punjabi Lekh Senior Shreniyaan Layi, lit. 'New Punjabi Essays for Senior Classes', 2005
- ਨਿਵੇਕਲੇ ਪੰਜਾਬੀ ਲੇਖ ਐਲੀਮੇਨ੍ਟ੍ਰੀ ਸ਼੍ਰੇਣੀਆਂ ਲਈ, Nivekle Punjabi Lekh Elementary Shreniyaan Layi, 'New Punjabi Essays for Elementary Classes', 2008
- ਰੌਚਕ ਪੰਜਾਬੀ ਵਿਆਕਰਨ ਸੀਨੀਅਰ ਸ਼੍ਰੇਣੀਆਂ ਲਈ, Rauchak Punjabi Viakaran Senior Shreniyaan Layi, 'Interesting Punjabi Grammar for Senior Classes', 2005
- ਰੌਚਕ ਪੰਜਾਬੀ ਵਿਆਕਰਨ ਐਲੀਮੇਨ੍ਟ੍ਰੀ ਸ਼੍ਰੇਣੀਆਂ ਲਈ, Rauchak Punjabi Viakaran Elementary Shreniyaan Layi, 'Interesting Punjabi Grammar for Elementary Classes', 2008

== See also ==
- List of Indian writers
