= Ajit Saini =

Ajit Singh Saini (1922–2007) was a writer of Punjab (India). He was associated with the Punjabi daily Ajit as its managing editor and columnist. He is remembered in Punjab both as a freedom-fighter and a writer and columnist. He was an officer in Indian National Army (INA) and a close lieutenant of Subhas Chandra Bose. Saini worked with the wire service of INA and Arzi Hukumat-e-Azad Hind or Provisional Government of Free India, more simply, Indian government in exile.

== Indian National Army (INA) officer ==
Ajit Saini joined the British Indian Army, in which he was a lieutenant. While fighting the Japanese army in the Malayan campaign, he came under the influence of Capt. Mohan Singh and thereafter defected to the Indian National Army to fight for India's liberation from British rule. He was first the INA's liaison officer for handling communication with Japanese forces and diplomats. Thereafter he was also the assistant editor of INA news magazine Azad Hind, published from Singapore.

== Career as a journalist and writer ==
In 1956 Ajit Saini joined Information and Broadcasting Department of Government of India and launched his dedicated writing career. He was also the managing editor of the Punjabi daily newspaper Ajit.

== Awards and recognition ==
Ajit Saini was recognised during his lifetime both for his contributions to India's freedom movement and to the literary arena. During his lifetime he won the following awards and recognitions:

- Commendation from the Chief Minister of Punjab, Giani Zail Singh, later India's President, for contribution to freedom movement.
- Commendation from Sahit Vichar Kendar for literary contributions.
- Commendation from the Punjab Teachers Union for journalistic excellence.

His short-story anthology Wadhiya Tea-set was released in a literary conference held in New Delhi by India's Foreign Minister Narasimha Rao, later Prime Minister.

== Literary works ==
Some of Ajit Saini's notable anthologies of short stories in Punjabi language which won critical acclaim are:

- Jai Hind
- Wadhiya Tea-set
- Tutade Rishte
- Mitti Di Pukar
- Aurat Faltu Nahin
- Adhura Shahkar
- Ek Manas ki Jaat

== Death widely condoled: Chief Minister's message ==
Ajit Saini, died 10 December 2007 and his demise was widely condoled in Punjab. In a condolence message the Chief Minister said that 'Saini was a multi-faceted personality who served in the Indian National Army (INA) and made a significant contribution towards the Indian freedom struggle. As a noted Journalist and an eminent Columnist Ajit Saini through his prolific writings in the esteemed columns of regional and national newspapers proved to be instrumental in bringing social awakening amongst the down-trodden and unprivileged section of the society. In his death "a void has been created in the literary circles which was difficult to be filled"', said Badal.
