= Sohan Singh Seetal =

- Born: Sohan Singh Pannu; 7 August 1909; Village Qadiwind Tehsil Kasur United India
- Died: 23 September 1998 (aged 89)
- Citizenship: Indian
- Relatives: Khushal Singh (father); Dyal Kaur (mother)
- Writing career
- Language: Punjabi

Sohan Singh Seetal (1909-1998) was an Indian writer, poet and lyricist of Punjabi language.

Seetal, Sohan Singh entered the field of literary creation after 1947. He has written over a score novel most of which are romantic and sentimental. Among these Dive di Lo (The Flame of the Earthen Lamp), Mul da Mas (Flesh at a Price) and Badla (Revenge) deal with the eternal problem of the woman about which most Indian writers and artistes cannot help being sentimental. Sohan Singh Seetal has in due course travelled from sentimentality, which often becomes macabre, to competent realism, although here also the projection of problems and their solution are not without a sentimental tinge.

On the whole, Seetal has described in his novels the countryside of Central Punjab and the life of its people as a kind of parallel to Nanak Singh who deals with urban life in the same tract of land. Both are reformist and sentimental to start with and then grow into realists in their later work but while Nanak Singh tends towards a kind of Gandhian Socialism, Seetal's concern with the peasant's life takes a populist form. His novel Jug Badal Gaya won the Sahitya Akademi Award in 1974.
