= Yashwant Singh (scientist) =

Indian theoretical physicist (born 1944)

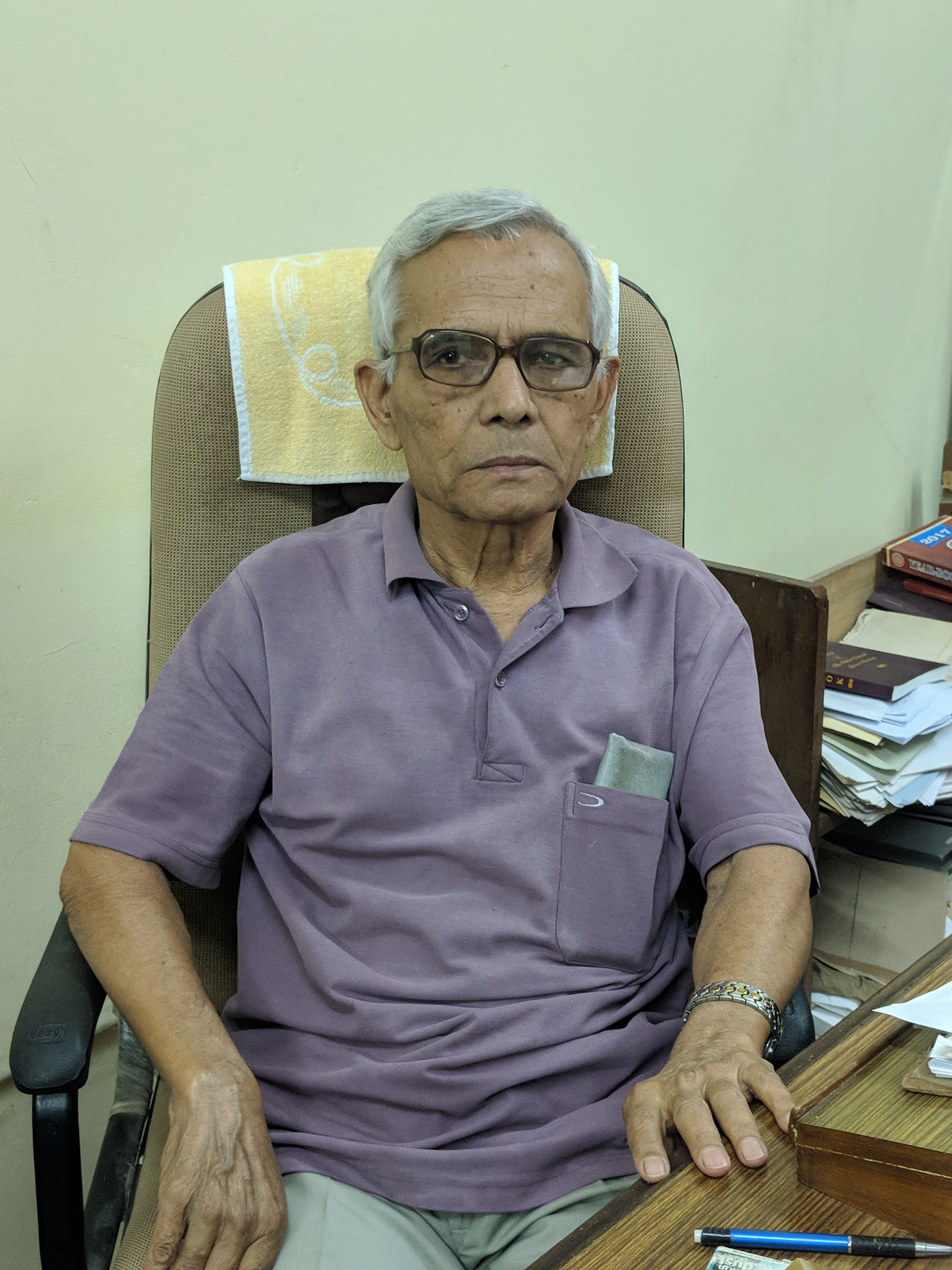

Yashwant Singh (born 28 July 1944) is an Indian theoretical physicist known for his contributions to soft matter physics. He is at present Distinguished Professor and INSA Senior Scientist at Banaras Hindu University.

== Biography ==
Dr. Yashwant Singh born on 28 July 1944 in a village near Varanasi, Uttar Pradesh. He completed his B.Sc. and M.Sc. in Physics from Gorakhpur University (Now DDU University) in 1962 and 1964. He then joined Indian Association for the Cultivation of Sciences (IACS), Jadavpur, Kolkata, where he worked on transport phenomenon in gaseous state and obtained D. Phil. from Calcutta University (1969). He started his professional career as lecturer at Banaras Hindu University where he continues to work as a Distinguished Professor. In between he has worked at IBM Research Laboratory, California (1976–78). and University of Illinois, Urbana Champaign (1982–84) United States.

Singh has made contributions to the theory of liquids, liquid crystals, polymer statistics, and to the theory of liquid-solid and solid-solid transitions.

== Awards and honours ==
He is an elected Fellow of Indian Academy of Sciences, Bangalore, The National Academy of Sciences, India and The Indian National Science Academy, New Delhi
