= Jaswant Singh (Khoji) =

Jaswant Singh Khoji (also known as Bauji) was the founder of Braham Bunga Trust and Naam Simran congregation camps at Dodra.

== Background ==
At the age of 24, while serving as a clerk in the Indian Army in Burma, Jaswant Singh became impressed by the writings of Sikh scholars Professor Puran Singh and Bhai Vir Singh. He was baptized at Sri Akal Takhat Sahib Amritsar, and started conducting his life according to the principles of the Sikh religion. Upon retirement from the Army, he founded the Sikh congregation camps movement with former army companions from Myanmar. Khoji never intentionally promoted himself or his works. He lived his final days in relative solitude, restricting himself to his home and the company of a few friends. During a visit to Calgary in 1981, he spread the movement of periodic Sikh congregations for Kirtan and Naam Simran to the United States, Canada, and other countries.

== Works ==
Spiritual congregations Held all over the world: India: New Delhi Patiala Mumbai Haridwar

North America: USA: New York New Jersey Pennsylvania Virginia Dallas- Texas Austin- Texas San Jose- California Detroit Atlanta

CANADA: Montreal Toronto

=== Movement of Sikh periodic congregations ===
Singh started this movement in the village of Dodra in 1960 with some of his Burmese army companions. Initially, fortnightly congregations were organized in various villages. More recently, 2-day congregations have taken place in various Indian cities, especially in Punjab. Annual 4-10 day congregation camps are also held in the villages of Dodra and Doraha.

=== Establishment of Gurdwaras ===
In 1972, he established the first Gurdwara in the village of Dodra on a plot of land donated by his army companion Subedar Kishan Singh. In 1990, he established a bigger hall (200 ft x 150 ft) in new Gurdwara Building in village Dodra and established Braham Bunga Trust in 1983. There is another branch of Gurdwara established in the village Doraha in the district of Ludhiana in Punjab.

=== Writings ===
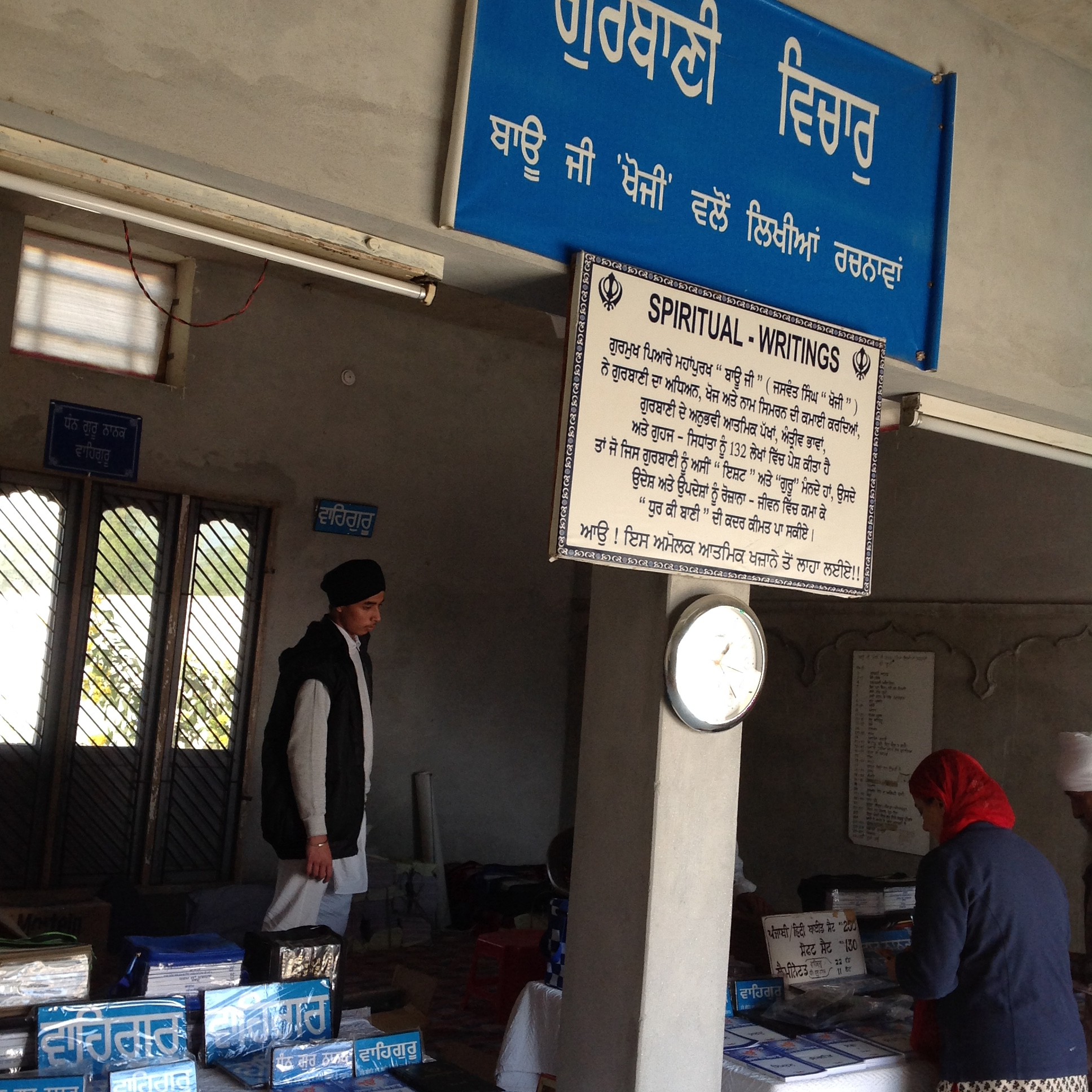
Books and spiritual writings of Baboo Jaswant Singh Khoji

Based on hymns of Sri Guru Granth Sahib, holy book of Sikhs, he wrote 132 articles in Punjabi on various topics about concepts and principals of Sikhism like Sangat, Haumai, Shabad, Dooja Bhau, Simran, Dharam or Mazahab, Bharam, Bandhan-Chhuttan. These are available in 13 books and have been published by Braham Bunga Trust. These books have been translated in Hindi and English and five articles are written by him in English.
