= Chaman Lal (writer) =

Indian writer

Chaman Lal (born 27 August 1947) retired as a professor in Hindi translation from Jawaharlal Nehru University. He is now Honorary advisor to Bhagat Singh Archives and Resource Centre, Delhi Archives of Delhi Govt.cn date is March 2021

== Early life ==
Lal was born in Rampura Phul, Bathinda district, Punjab.

== Books ==
- The Bhagat Singh Reader
- Understanding Bhagat Singh
- Bhagat Singh's jail notebook
- Bhagatasiṃha sampūrṇa dastāveja
- Bhagat Singh-Hindi
- Bhagat Singh key rajneetik dastavez
- Bhagat Singh Sampuran Lekhan-Hindi-four volumes
- Krantiveer Bhagat Singh:Abhyuodey aur Bhavishya
- Bhagat Singh:Vicharan Inqlabi-Panjabi
- Inqlabi Itihas de Sunehre Panne
- Ghadar pary nayak:Kartar Singh Sarabha
- Bhāratīya sāhitya meṃ dalita evaṃ strī-lekhana (Dalit & women writing in Indian literature)
- Dalita aura aśveta sāhitya kucha vicāra
- Hindī patrakāritā vividha āyāma
- Yashpal ke Upanyason men raajnitik chetna
- Pratinidhi Hindi Upanyas
- Sahitya Sanskriti ka pragatisheel samajshashtriya avlokan
- Dalit Sahitya ek mulyankan
- Guru Ravidas:Dalit Sahitya ke Agardoot
- Kavita ke Manviya Sarokar
- Jagdish Chander:Dalit Jivan ke Upanyaskar
- Pash:Beech ka rasta nahin gota
- Pash:Samay O' Bhai Samay
- Pash:Vartman ke Rubru
- Pash:Sampuran Kavitayen
- Pash:Storm never know Defeat
- Surjit Patar:An̐dhere meṃ sulagatī varṇamālā
- Surjit Patar:Kabhi Nahin Socha Tha
- Lu Xun:Kala, Sahit ate Sabhiachar
- Waryam Sandhu:Shreshath kahanian
- Swarajbeer:Dharamguru
- Mary Tylor:BhARTI jailan vich panj vareh
- Prasangvas
- Shahkar Sahit ate Sahitkar
- Punjabi and Dalit Images in Indian Literature

== Awards ==
Lal won the Sahitya Akademi Award in 2002 but returned the award in protest in 2016.
