= Mohan Singh (poet) =

Indian poet and academic

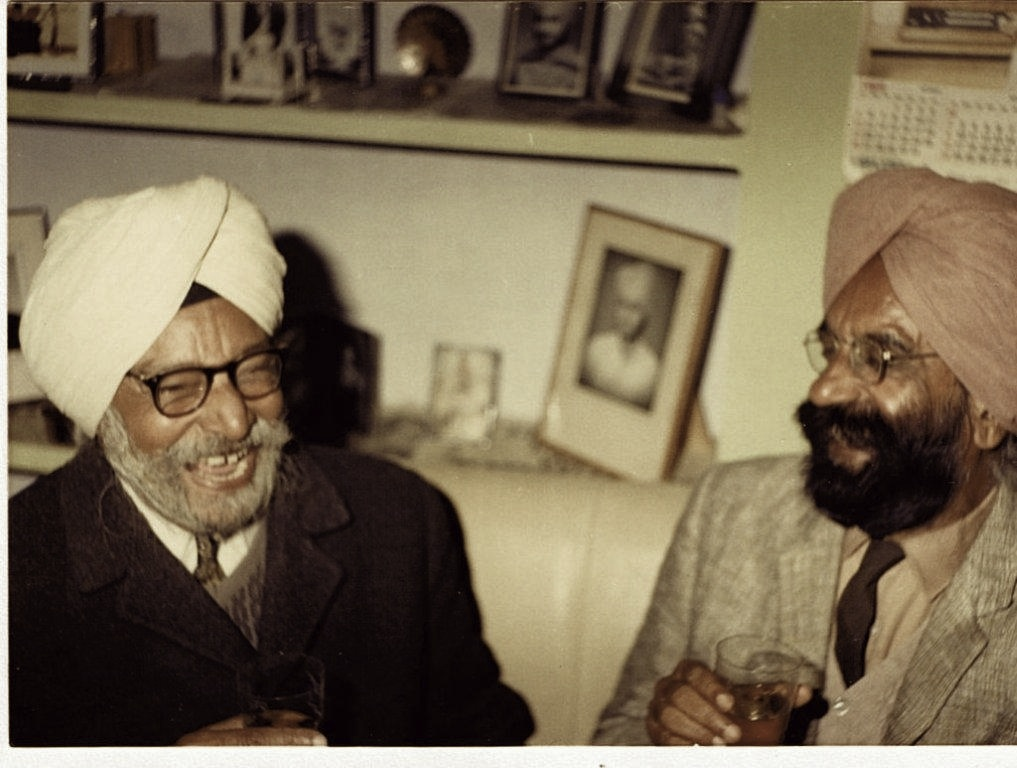
- Mohan Singh (left), Sant Singh Sekhon (right)
- Born: 1905; Lyallpur, Punjab, British India (present-day Pakistan)
- Died: 1978 (aged 72–73)
- Occupations: Writer, scholar

Mohan Singh (1905–1978) was a noted Indian poet in the Punjabi language and an academic, and one of the early pioneers of modern Punjabi poetry.

== Biography ==
Born in 1905 at Lyallpur (now in Pakistan), Mohan Singh spent the early years of his life at his ancestral village Dhamial in Rawalpindi District. His poem Kuri Pathohar Di is reminiscent of his romantic early days. He obtained a master's degree in Persian and started his career as a lecturer in Persian, Urdu and Punjabi at Khalsa College, Amritsar in 1933. He was well read in English, Persian and Urdu literatures. At Amritsar, Teja Singh, Sant Singh Sekhon, Gurbachan Singh 'Talib' became his friends. In 1940, he joined as a lecturer in the Sikh National College, Lahore, but after some time he left the job and started a firm, Hind Publishers to promote the literary standards of Punjabi publications. In 1939, he started his famous literary Punjabi monthly, Panj darya. After Partition In 1947 he shifted his business to Amritsar and then to Jullundur, but ultimately he closed down the firm. Then he became the teacher in Khalsa College, Patiala. Later, he worked as professor emeritus at the Punjab Agricultural University, Ludhiana from 1970 to 1974 and made this industrial town of Punjab his home towards the end of his life.

== Collection ==
Prof Mohan Singh gave Punjabi poetry collections like Sanve Pattar (The Green Leaves), Buhe (Doors) and Jindran (Locks), a total of 10 poetry books and one Mahakavya.

== Prof. Mohan Singh Mela ==
Prof Mohan Singh Memorial International Cultural Mela was organized every year by Prof Mohan Singh Memorial Foundation.

== Awards ==
He received Sahitya Akademi award in 1959 Wadda Vela (Poetry).

== Modern Punjabi poetry ==
Prof. Mohan Singh was known as the father of modern Punjabi poetry. The other poets who contributed significantly to the growth of modern Punjabi poetry in the initial years include Amrita Pritam, Harbhajan Singh and Shiv Kumar Batalvi. Mohan Singh has been hailed as the greatest Punjabi poet of the 20th century He is hailed by many modern artists including Hadiqa Kiani who refers to him, and recites his lyrics in her live versions of "Buhe Bariyan".

== See also ==
- List of Punjabi language poets
