= Sujan Singh =

Punjabi writer

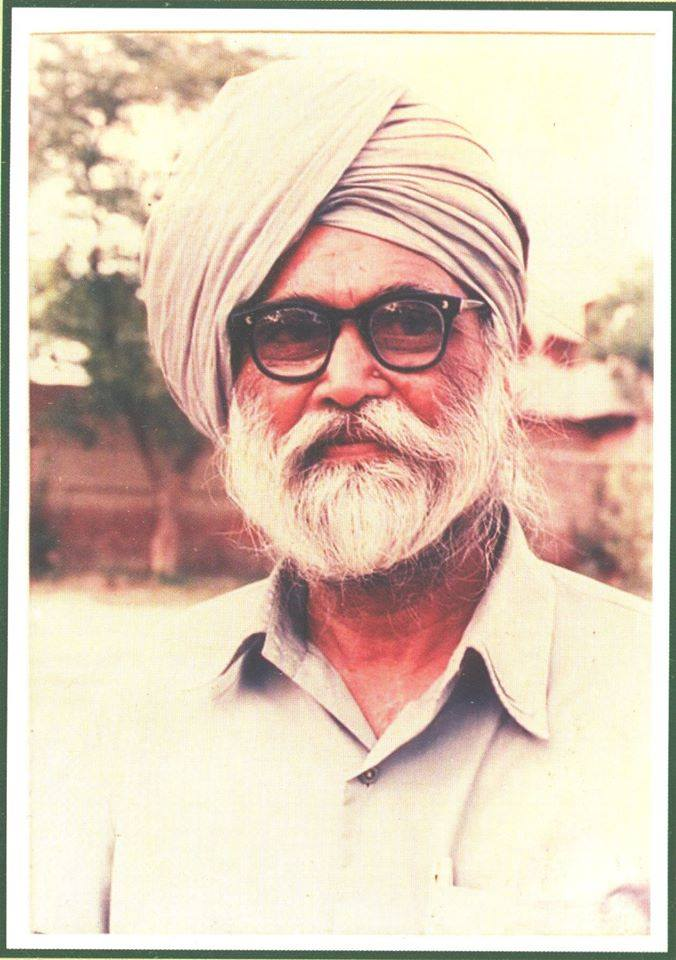
- Born: Sujan Singh; 29 July 1909; Dera Baba Nanak, Gurdaspur district, British Punjab
- Died: 21 April 1993 (aged 83)
- Other names: Principal Sujan Singh; Professor Sujan Singh
- Occupation: Writer
- Known for: Stories (generally on hardships faced by lower strata), essays and books on Punjabi Gurus

Sujan Singh was a story writer of Punjab, India.

== Early life ==
Singh was born on 29 July 1909, to father S. Hakim Singh, in Dera Baba Nanak, a town of Gurdaspur district in Indian Punjab. He was brought up by his maternal grandparents and spent his early childhood days in Calcutta. Following the deaths of his grandparents and father, Singh experienced considerable hardship.

He got his primary education from Bal Mukand Khatri Middle School and did his Bachelor of Arts from Khalsa College in Amritsar. He did his Giani (a course) and Master of Arts in Punjabi by corresponding.

He started working as a bank clerk. After some time he became a Punjabi teacher in Quetta, Pakistan. He also worked as a headmaster. Later he became a Punjabi lecturer. He was also a principal in Guru Nanak College, Gurdaspur.

He was associated with the progressive literary movement. Singh served as president of the Kendri Punjabi Lekhak Sabha, senior vice-president of the Punjabi Sahitya Akademi in Ludhiana, and a member of the presidiums of the Progressive Writers' Association of India and the Afro-Asian Writers Association.

He was married to Joginder Kaur. He had three sons and five daughters. Punjabi poet Bawa Balwant was one of his close friends.

== Career ==
His writings addressed human relationships and the experiences of socially disadvantaged people. Since he was acquainted to world literature, he attempted to write short stories which can be compared with the classical short stories of the world literature. He also wrote retellings of stories about the Sikh Gurus.

In addition to short stories, Singh wrote essays. His first essay, Tawian wala Waaja, was published in the monthly magazine Likhari. He published two collections of essays, Jammu Jee Tusi Barhe Raa and Khumban Da Shikar. His story anthologies include Dukh Sukh (1939), Dukh Sukh Ton Pichhon(1944), Dedh Aadmi, Manukh Te Pashu(1954), Kalgi Dian Annian(1969) and Shehar Te Garaan(1985).

== Awards ==
He was awarded the Sahitya Akademi Award by the Sahitya Akademi, India's National Academy of Letters, for his story collection, Shehar Te Garaan, in 1986. In 1972, the Language Department of Punjab presented Singh with an award for Punjabi short-story writing. He also wrote three books on the lives of Sri Guru Nanak Dev ji (Wade Kian Wadiian), Guru Amar Dass ji (Amar Guru Rishman) and Guru Gobind Singh ji (Kalgi Dian Annian).
