= Puran Singh =

Indian writer, poet

Prof Puran Singh ਪ੍ਰੋ. ਪੂਰਨ ਸਿੰਘ
- Born: 17 February 1881; Salhad, Abbottabad, Punjab, British India (present-day Khyber Pakhtunkhwa, Pakistan)
- Died: 31 March 1931 (aged 50); Dehradun, United Provinces, British India (present-day Uttarakhand, India)
- Education: B.S. Chemical engineering PhD Theology (particular emphasis on Dharmic hermeneutics)
- Alma mater: Tokyo University, Japan
- Occupations: Scientist, mystic, poet
- Spouse: Maya Devi (5 March 1904)
- Relatives: Kartar Singh (father)
- Writing career
- Language: English, Punjabi, Persian, Hindi, German
- Period: 1900–1931
- Notable works: English: Sisters of The Spinning Wheel (1921); Unstrung Beads (1923); The Spirit of Oriental Poetry (1926); The Book of Ten Masters; The Spirit Born People; Swami Rama; Punjabi: Khulle Maidan; Khulle Ghund (1923); Khulle Lekh (1929); Khulle Asmani Rang (1927)

Professor Puran Singh (Punjabi: ਪ੍ਰੋ. ਪੂਰਨ ਸਿੰਘ; 17 February 1881 – 31 March 1931) was a Punjabi poet, scientist and mystic. Born in Abbottabad, now in Pakistan, in a Sikh family, he is one of the founders of modern Punjabi poetry. He passed his matriculation examination at the Mission High School Rawalpindi in 1897 and, after obtaining a scholarship for the years 1900 to 1903, obtained a degree in Industrial Chemistry from Tokyo University in Pharmaceutical Sciences. Though a born Sikh he became a Buddhist Bhikshu and a sanyasi under influence of Ukakura a Japanese Buddhist monk and Swami Ramtirath respectively before he finally got settled as a Sikh mystic when he came under influence of Bhai Vir Singh during a Sikh Educational Conference meeting at Sialkot in 1912.

== Early life ==
Singh was born in a Sikh Ahluwalia family at Abbottabad, Punjab, British India on 17 February 1881.

== As mystic ==
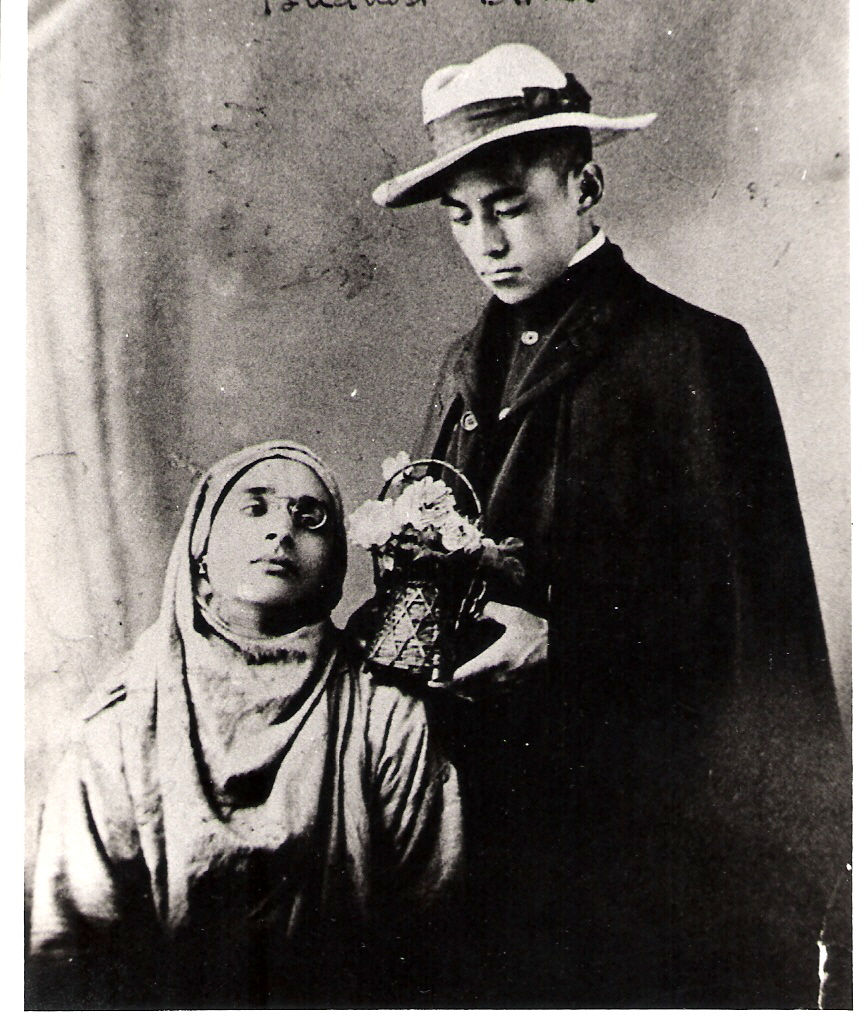
Photograph of Puran Singh as a Buddhist monk at Tokyo University, Japan, 1901

Four crucial events—his Japanese experience, his encounter with the American poet Walt Whitman, his discipleship of Svami Ram Tirath, and his meeting with the Sikh saint Bhai Vir Singh—were influential. As a student in Japan, he was impressed with the land and its people, and was greatly influenced by the romantic aestheticism of Okakura Kakuzo, Japanese artist and scholar. Walt Whitman, the American poet, had left a deep impression on his poetics and practice as on his world view. It was in Japan that he met Rama Tirtha, under whose influence he took on the identity of a monk. An encounter with Bhai Vir Singh in 1912 led to his formal return to Sikhism.

== In Science and Business ==
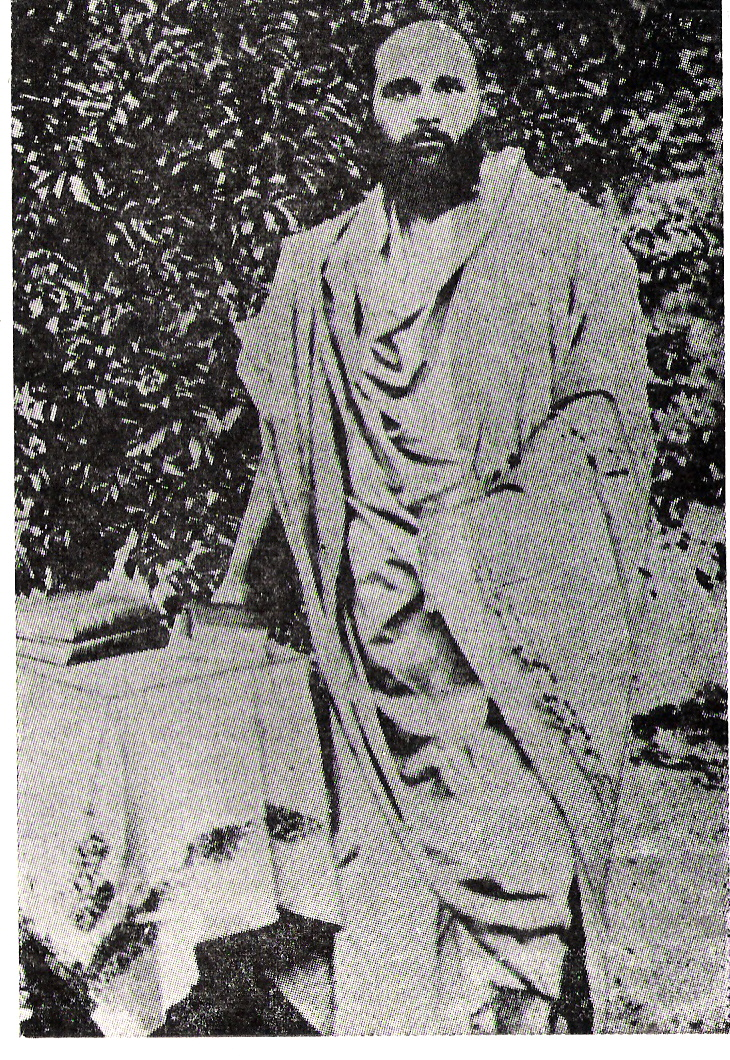
Photograph of Puran Singh as a research chemist at the Forest Research Institute in Dehradun, ca.1908–18

Puran Singh started the distillation of essential oils in Lahore in association with Ishar Das and Rai Bahadur Shiv Nath. He prepared thymol, and fennel and lemon oils. Owing to deceitful dealings on the part of his partners, he closed the business and migrated to Dehra Dun, where he remained as a disciple of Swami Rama Tirtha. He returned to Lahore in December 1904 and joined Diamond v.j.Hindu Technical Institute as Principal. He restarted his monthly Thundering Dawn from Lahore. He resigned the Principalship in November 1906 to establish a factory for soapmaking at Doivala (Dehra Dun) but soon sold it off to a minister of Tihri to join in April 1907 as a Forest chemist at the Forest Research Institute, Dehra Dun, from where he sought retirement in 1918. He had stints in the princely states of Patiala and Gwalior. At Gwalior (1919–23) he turned the scorching desert into a fragrant oasis of rosha grass and eucalyptus, interspersed with fruit trees. He gave up his appointment at Gwalior to join Sir Sundar Singh Majithia's sugar factory at Surayya (1923–24) where he discovered a special method for purifying sugar without mixing it with charred bones. In 1926, he moved over to Chakk 73, near Nankana Sahib, where he got a plot of land on lease from the Punjab Government to grow rosha grass on a commercial scale. In 1928, his plantation suffered a heavy loss owing to floods.

== A Poet and a literary Person ==
Puran Singh was a lover of nature and beauty, and wrote beautiful and tender poetry both in English and Punjabi. An example from Khulle Asmani Rang his Punjabi verse is given

ਜਿੱਥੇ ਸੁਹੱਪਣ ਸੋਹਣੀ ਪਰਤ ਹੈ ਵਿਛਦੀ,
ਬਸ ਇਕ ਪ੍ਰਕਾਸ਼ ਦਿਲ ਖਿੱਚਵਾਂ,
ਇਕ ਰਾਗ ਜਿਸ ਵਿੱਚ ਰੱਬ ਰੂਪ
ਰੰਗ ਪਿਘਲ-ਪਿਘਲ ਰੂਪ ਅਨੂਪ
ਹੋਰ-ਹੋਰ ਸੱਜਦਾ,
ਜਿੱਥੇ ਸੁਹੱਪਣ ਆਪਾ ਵਾਰ, ਸਦਕੇ ਹੋ-ਹੋ
ਬਿਹਬਲਤਾ ਅਨੰਤ ਵਿੱਚ ਉੱਠੀ ਕਦੀ

Jithē suhapaṇa sōhaṇī parata hai vichadī,
basa ika prakāśa dila khicavāṁ,
ika rāga jisa vica raba rūpa
raga pighala-pighala rūpa anūpa
hōra-hōra sajadā,
jithē suhapaṇa āpā vāra, sadakē hō-hō
bihabalatā anata vica uṭhī kadī

Another example from "Khulle Maidaan" in Punjabi verse on JAWAAN PUNJAB

Ih beparwah Punjab de
Maut noo makhaulan karan
maran theen nahin dared
piaar naal ih karan gulamee
jaan koh aapnee vaar dinde
par tain naa mannan kise dee
khalo jaan dangaan modhe te khalaar ke
mannan bas aapnee javaanee de zor noo
aakharkhaand, albele, dhur theen satguraan de
azaad keete ih bande
Punjab naa hindoo naa musalmaan
Punjab saraa jeendaa guraan de naan te

In 1930, he fell ill with tuberculosis and died during his stay at Dehradun on 31 March 1931.

== Works ==
He composed three volumes of Punjabi poetry: Khule Maidan (‘Free Meadows’) in 1923, Khule Ghund (‘Free Veils’) 1923 and Khule Asmani Rang (‘Boundless Blue Colours of the Sky’) in 1926. His poetry was composed in free verse and explored the experience of villagers, peasants and the poor. Among his famous works in English are The Sisters of the Spinning Wheel (1921), Unstrung Beads (1923), The Spirit of Oriental Poetry (1926); in Punjabi, Khulhe Maidan, Khulhe Ghund (1923), Khulhe Lekh (1929), and Khulhe Asmani Rang (1927). Seven Baskets of Prose Poems.

Among his prose writing published works are The Book of Ten Masters, The Spirit Born People, Swami Rama in English and Khulle Lekh (1929)in Punjabi and Kanya Daan te hor Lekh in Hindi.

Besides what has seen the light of the day, some work of greater magnitude still remains unpublished. Of this unpublished work the two most considerable are Spirit of the Sikh, that is a voluminous series of moments of spiritual vision growing out of the teachings of Guru Nanak and his successors, and Prakasina, a novel, which is the story of a Buddhist princess. Both these came in the manuscript form to the Punjabi University, which has a project of salvaging the creative effort of the genius of the Punjab.

== Publications ==
- Anecdotes from Sikh History (1908)
- Sisters of the Spinning Wheel (1921)
- An Afternoon with Self (1922)
- At His Feet (1922)
- Khulhe Maidan (ਖੁੱਲ੍ਹੇ ਮੈਦਾਨ [Free Meadows], 1923)
- Khulhe Ghund (ਖੁੱਲ੍ਹੇ ਘੁੰਡ [Free Veils], 1923)
- Unstrung Beads (1923)
- Bride of the Sky (1924)
- The Story of Swami Rama Tirtha (1924)
- Nargas: Songs of a Sikh (Translations of Bhai Vir Singh's poems) (1924)
- The Book of Ten Masters (1926)
- Khulhe Asmani Rang (ਖੁਲ੍ਹੇ ਅਸਮਾਨੀ ਰੰਗ [Boundless Blue Colours of the Sky], 1926)
- The Spirit of Oriental Poetry (1926)
- Spirit Born People (1928)
- Seven Baskets Of Prose Poems (1928)
- Khulhe Lekh (ਖੁਲ੍ਹੇ ਲੇਖ [Straight Compositions], 1929)
- Chup Preet Da Shaihanshaah Biopaare (ਚੁਪ ਪ੍ਰੀਤ ਦਾ ਸ਼ਹਿਨਸ਼ਾਹ ਬਿਉਪਾਰੀ)
- Abchali Jot (ਅਬਚਲ ਜੋਤ)
- Charan Chhuh
- Kanyadan te Hor Lekh
- Naulakha Haar Ate Hor Kahanian

Translated Works:

- Sikhi Di Atma (ਸਿੱਖੀ ਦੀ ਆਤਮਾ [Spirit and Psyche of Sikhi])
- Gur Shabad Vismad Bodh (ਗੁਰ-ਸ਼ਬਦ ਵਿਸਮਾਦ-ਬੋਧ)
- Jagdian Jotan (ਜਗਦੀਆਂ ਜੋਤਾਂ [Awakened and Luminous Light])
- Das Guru Darshan (ਦਸ ਗੁਰ ਦਰਸ਼ਨ [The Ten Masters])
- Karna Khirya Vich Punjab
- Jin ke Chole Ratre (ਜਿਨ ਕੇ ਚੋਲੇ ਰੱਤੜੇ)
- Laudhe Pehar Da Atam Chintan
- Sikhi da prena sabot walt Whitman
- Zindagi de Rahaan 'Te

=== Posthumous ===
- Guru Gobind Singh Reflections and Offerings (1967)
- Prakasina, a Buddhist princess (1980)
- The Temple Tulips (1980)
- The Spirit of the Sikh, Part 1 (1981)
- The Spirit of the Sikh, Part 2 (2 vol.) (1981)
- On Paths of Life (An Autobiography) (1982)
- Walt Whitman and the Sikh Inspiration (1982)
- Khalse Da Adarsh (ਖ਼ਾਲਸੇ ਦਾ ਆਦਰਸ਼ [Standards of the Khalse])
- Prof. Puran Singh Ratanawali (2 vol. compete Gurmukhi prose) (2013)
- Anecdotes from Sikh History (Complete Series with Sketches from Sikh History) (2015)
- Guru Gobind Singh: The Tenth Master (2017)
- Readings from Guru Grantha (2018) (Translation of Gurbani)

=== Research Papers ===
1. A note on the analysis of cutch and preparation of pure catechin by Puran Singh, Indian Forest Mem, (1908), Vol. 1, Pt 1.
2. Note on the Utilisation of Khair Forests in Eastern Bengal and Assam by Puran Singh, Forest Pamphlet,(1908), No. 1.
3. Note on the Manufacture of Ngai Camphor by Puran Singh, Indian Forest Rec. (1908), Vol. 1, Pt III.
4. A paper on the Future of Cutch and Katha Manufacture by Puran Singh, Indian Forester (1909), Vol. XXXV, No.2., Pt I.
5. A note on the Manufacture of Pure Shellac by Puran Singh, Indian Forest Mem. (Chemistry Series) Vol. XXXV, No. 2., Pt II.
6. A Chemical Investigation of the Constituents of Burmese Varnish (Melanorrhoea usitata, Sup). By Puran Singh, Indian Forest Rec. (1909).
7. Paper on some tanning materials and the manufacture of tannin extracts in India (Read at All-India Industrial Conference in India held in December 1909) by Puran Singh.
8. Report on the bleaching of some Indian coloured Woods by Puran Singh, Appendix. to Indian Forest Mem., (1909), Vo. II, Pt 1.
9. Analytical Constants of Shellac, Lac, Resin and Lac Wax by Puran Singh, J. Soc. Chem. Ind., (1910), Vol. XXIX, p. 1435.
10. Note on Calorimetric Tests of some Indian woods by Puran Singh, Forest Bulletin, (1911), No. 1.
11. Memorandum on the oil-value of Sandal Wood by Puran Singh, Forest Bulletin, (1911), No. 6.
12. Note on the Chemistry and Trade Forms of Lac by Puran Singh, Forest Bulletin, (1911), No. 7
13. A Preliminary note on the use of Nickel Hydroxide in Tannin estimation by Puran Singh . Soc. Chem. Ind., (1911), Vol. XXX, No. 15.
14. Note on the best season for collecting Myrobalans as tanning material by Puran Singh. Indian Forester (1911); Vol. XXXVII, No. 9.
15. Method of distinguishing powellized and the unpowellized woods by Puran Singh, Indian Forester (1911), Vol. XXXVII, No 10.
16. Note on Resin-value of Podeophyllum emodi and the best season for collecting it by Puran Singh, Forest Bulletin (1912), No.9.
17. Podophyllum emodi by Puran Singh, Indian Forester (1912), Vol. XXXVIII, Nos. 4 and 7.
18. A short preliminary note on the suitability of dead wood of Acacia catechu for Katha making by Puran Singh. Indian Forester (1912), Vol. XXXVIII, No. 4.
19. A short Note on the earth eating habits of the Indian deer by Puran Singh, Indian Forester (1912), No. 7.
20. Note on the preparation of tannin extract with special reference to those prepared from the bark of Mangrove (Rhizophora muocronata) by Puran Singh, Indian Forest Res, (1912), Vol.III, Pt IV.
21. Note on Distillation and Composition of Turpentine oil from chir Resin and clarification of Indian Resin by Puran Singh. Indian Forest Rec (1912), Vo. IV, Pt 1.
22. Note on Turpentine of Pinus khasya, Pinus merkusii and Pinus excelsa by Puran Singh, Forest Bulletin, (1913), No. 24.
23. The Cultivation of drugs in Indian Forests by Puran Singh, Indian Forester (1913), Vol. XXXIX, No. 3.
24. Memorandum on the oil value of some Forest oil seeds by Puran Singh, Indian Forester (1913), Vol. XXXIX, No. 6.
25. Analysis of Gutta made from latex of Palaquium ellipticum by Puran Singh. Indian Forester (1913), Vol. XXXIX, No. 8.
26. The composition of Ceara Rubber from Coorg by Puran Singh, Indian Forester (1913), Vol. XXXIX, No. 8.
27. Indian Oak barks as materials for manufacture of tannin extract by Puran Singh, Indian Forester (1913), Vol. XXXIX, No. 9.
28. Terminalia tomentosa bark as a material for the manufacture of tannin extract by Puran Singh, Indian Forester (1913), Vol. XXXIX, No. 9.
29. Some mineral salts as Fish Poison by Puran Singh, Indian Forester (1913), Vol. XXXIX, No. 11.
30. A further note on the Calorimetric test of some Indian woods from Belgaum (Bombay) by Puran Singh, Indian Forester (1914), Vol. XL. No. 3.
31. Preservation of the Latex of Ficus religiosa by Puran Singh, Indian Forester (1914), Vol. XL, No. 9.
32. A Plea for the distillation of the Pine Needle oil in India by Puran Singh, Indian Forester (1914), Vol. XL, No. 10.
33. Nickel Tannates by Puran Singh. J. Soc. Chem. Ind. (1914), Vol. XXXIII, No. 4.
34. The Cus-Cus Oil in India by Puran Singh, Chem. Drugg. (1914), Vol. LXXXV.
35. A Further Note on the best season for collecting Myrabalans as Tanning material by Puran Singh, Indian Forester (1915), Vol. XLI, No. 1.
36. Note on Arwal (Cassia auriculata) Benth from Marwar by Puran Singh. Indian Forester (1915), Vol. XLI, No. 1.
37. A Further Note on the Oil value of some Sandal woods from Madras by Puran Singh, Indian Forester (1915), Vol. XLI, No. 8.
38. The Camphor content of Cinnamomum camphora grown at Dehra-Dun by Puran Singh, Indian Forester (1915), Vol. XLI, No. 8.
39. Note on the effect of Age on the Catechin content of the wood of Acacia catechu by Puran Singh, Indian Forester (1915), Vol. XLI, No. 12.
40. Note on Indian Sumach (Rhus continus Linn.) by Puran Singh, Forest Bulletin (1915)., No. 31.
41. Note on the Addition of fat to tannin extract by Puran Singh, J. Soc. Chem. Ind. (1915), Vol. XXXIV, No. 5.
42. Note on the Differentiation of Inn and Kanyin Species of Dipterocarpus timber of Burma by Puran Singh, Indian Forester (1916), Vol. XLII, No. 5.
43. Note on the constants of Indian Geranium oil (Motia) by Puran Singh, Indian Forest Rec. (1916), Vol. V, Pt. VII.
44. Note on the Burmese Myrabalans or Panga Fruits as tanning material by Puran Singh, Forest Bulletin (1916), No. 32.
45. A note on the use of Nickel Hydroxide in tannin estimation by Puran Singh and T.P. Ghose, J. Soc. Chem. Ind. (1916), Vol. XXXV, No. 3, p. 159.
46. (i)Note on the Eucalyptus Oil Industry in the Nilgris. (ii)Note on the Distillation of Geranium Oil in the Nilgris. (iii)Note on the manufacture of Wintergreen Oil in India by Puran Singh, Indian Forest Rec. (1917), Vol. V, Pt VIII.
47. Note on the Galls of Pistacia integessina by Puran Singh. Indian Forester (1917), Vol. XLII, No. 8.
48. Charcoal Briquettes by R.S. Pearson and Puran Singh, Indian Forester (1918), Vol. XLIV, No.3.
49. Effect of Storage on some Tanning Materials by Puran Singh, Indian Forester (1918), Vol. XLIV, No. 3.
50. A Preliminary Note on the manufacture of wood-tar by Puran Singh, Indian Forester(1918), Vol. XLIV, No. 4.
51. Walnut Bar by Puran Singh, Indian Forester (1918), Vol. XLIV, No. 8.
52. A Note on the Economic Values of Chinese Tallow Tree by Puran Singh, Indian Forester (1918), Vol. XLIV, No. 9.
53. Note on the Preparation of Turpentine, Rosin and Gum from Boswellia serrata (Roxb.) gum-oleo-resin by R.S. Pearson and Puran Singh, Indian Forest Rec. (1918) Vol. VI, Pt VI.
