= Puran's Well =

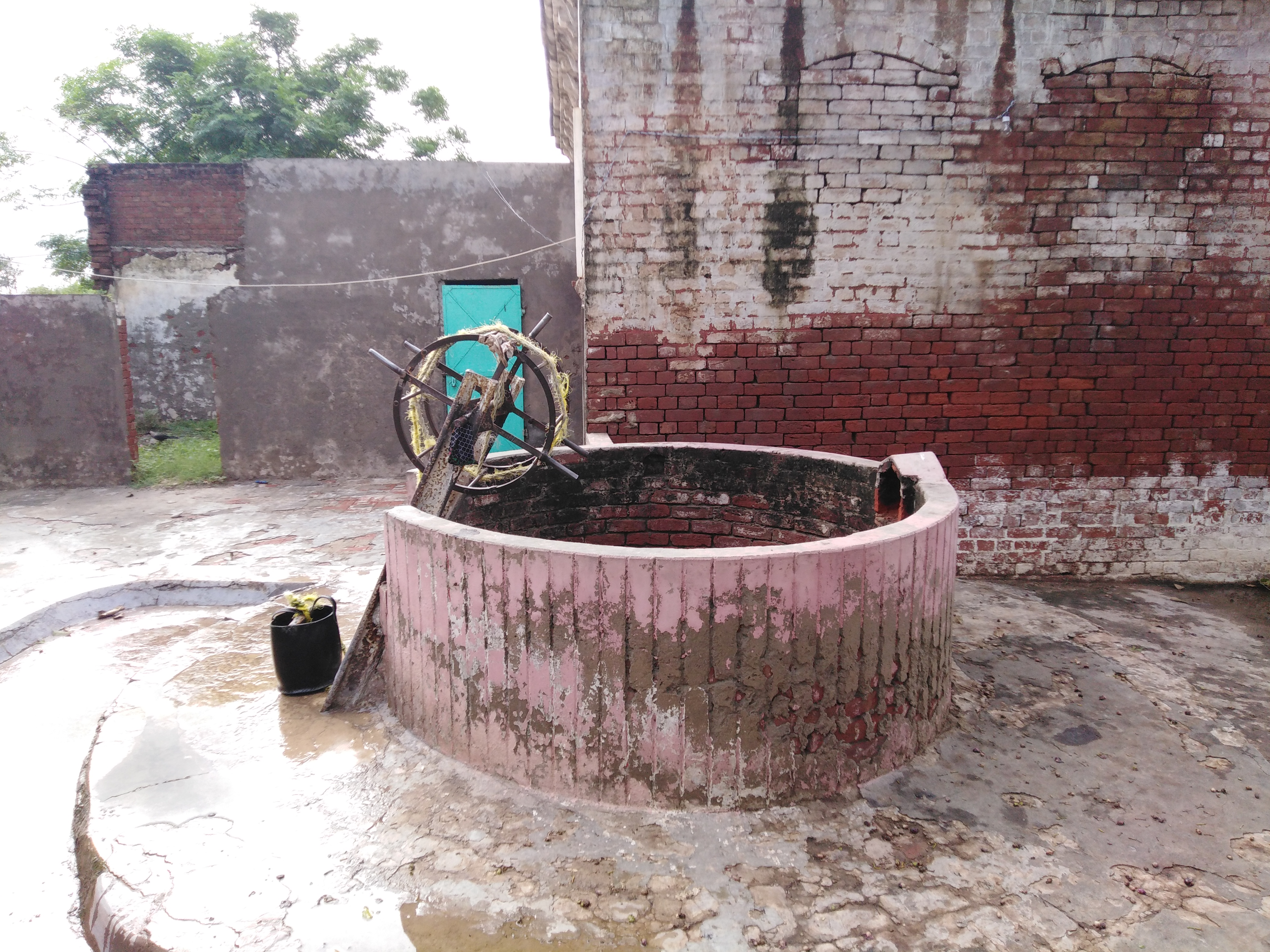
- Type: Well
- Present location: Near Sialkot, Punjab province, Pakistan

Puran's Well is a well located near Sialkot in the Punjab province of Pakistan. It is usually associated with mythical prince of Sialkot, Puran Bhagat.

== History ==
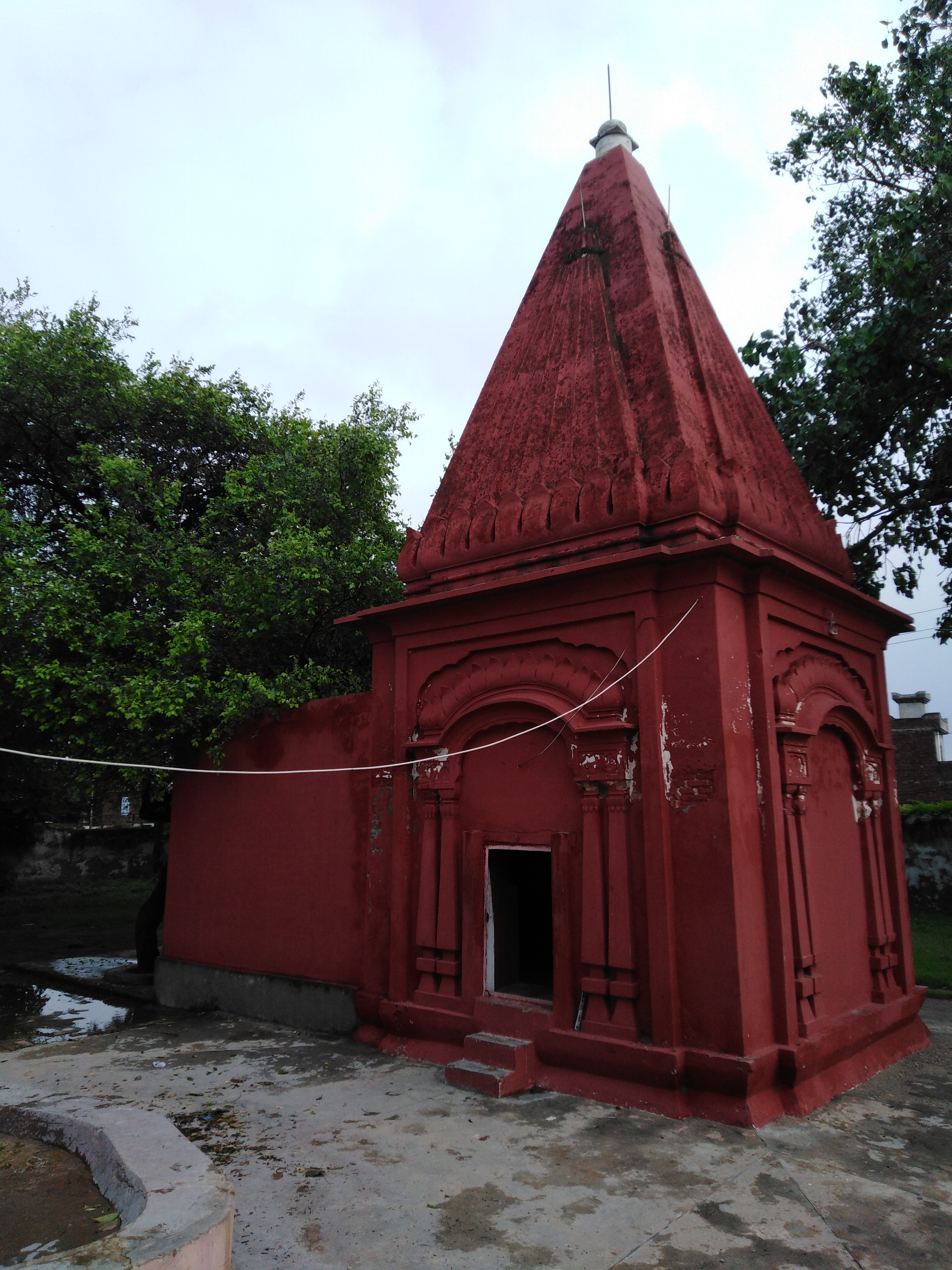
Temple Near to the Well

According to Punjabi folklore, prince Puran Bhagat was born to King of Sialkot Raja Sálbán and his queen Icchira. Upon the suggestion of local astrologers, Puran was sent away from the King for the first 12 years of his life, as it was said that King could not see the face of his son. While Puran was away, the king married a young girl named Luna, a tanner's daughter. After 12 years of isolation, Puran returned to the royal palace. There, Luna became romantically attracted toward Puran, who was of the same age. Being the step-son of Luna, Puran disapproved of her advances. A hurt Luna accused Puran of violating her honor. The infuriated monarch ordered Puran to be amputated and killed. The soldiers carried out his orders and cutoff the Puran's hands and legs and threw him in a well in the Puran's Well. Later, he was rescued and miraculously treated by legendary jogi, Gorakhnath.

== See also ==
- Sialkot
- Sialkot Fort
