= Krishan Nagar, Lahore =

Neighborhood in Lahore, Punjab, Pakistan

Krishan Nagar
- Neighbourhood
- Location within Pakistan
- Coordinates: 31°33′44″N 74°17′23″E
- Country: Pakistan
- Province: Punjab
- City: Lahore
- Tehsil: Lahore City
- Union council: 30
- Elevation: 201 m (659 ft)
- Time zone: UTC+5 (PST)

Krishan Nagar (Punjabi, Urdu: کرشن نگر) is a neighbourhood in Lahore City Tehsil of Lahore in Punjab, Pakistan.

In the 1930s during British Raj, the development of middle class localities in Lahore started to change and areas like Krishan Nagar and Sant Nagar were established. They were planned as geometrical in layout and had parks, sewage and drinking water facilities. The houses in these areas had high-ceilinged rooms like British bungalows. These neighborhoods were an improved version of the old Architecture of Lahore.

After the independence of Pakistan in 1947, the Hindu residents migrated to India. The area became mainly a residential quarter, heavily populated with Muslims. In 1992, after repeated protests from religious groups, Krishan Nagar and Sant Nagar were merged and renamed Islampura. However, it is still largely referred to by its former name similar to many other localities of Lahore such as Dharampura. In 2026, the Government of Punjab approved the reversion to the old historical names of various localities and streets in Lahore, including Krishan Nagar.
