= Punjabi literature =

Literary works written in the Punjabi language

Punjabi literature, specifically literary works written in the Punjabi language, is characteristic of the historical Punjab of present-day Pakistan and India and the Punjabi diaspora. The Punjabi language is written in several scripts, of which the Shahmukhi and Gurmukhī scripts are the most commonly used in Western Punjab and Eastern Punjab, respectively.

== History ==
=== Periodisation ===
Punjabi itself is divided into four stages of development by Padam (1954) and Bhardwaj (2016):

- First phase (1000–1400 CE) - with surviving works authored by Addahmāṇ (Abdul Rahman) and other works attributed to Fariduddin Ganjshakar (however the attribution is disputed and Ganjshakar's claimed works in the Sikh scripture may date to a later period by a different author named Farid Sani/Ibrahim Farid)
- Second phase (1400–1700 CE) - with surviving works authored by Farid Sani/Ibrahim Farid and the Sikh gurus
- Third phase (1700–1850 CE)
- Fourth phase (1850 CE to present)

=== Early history ===
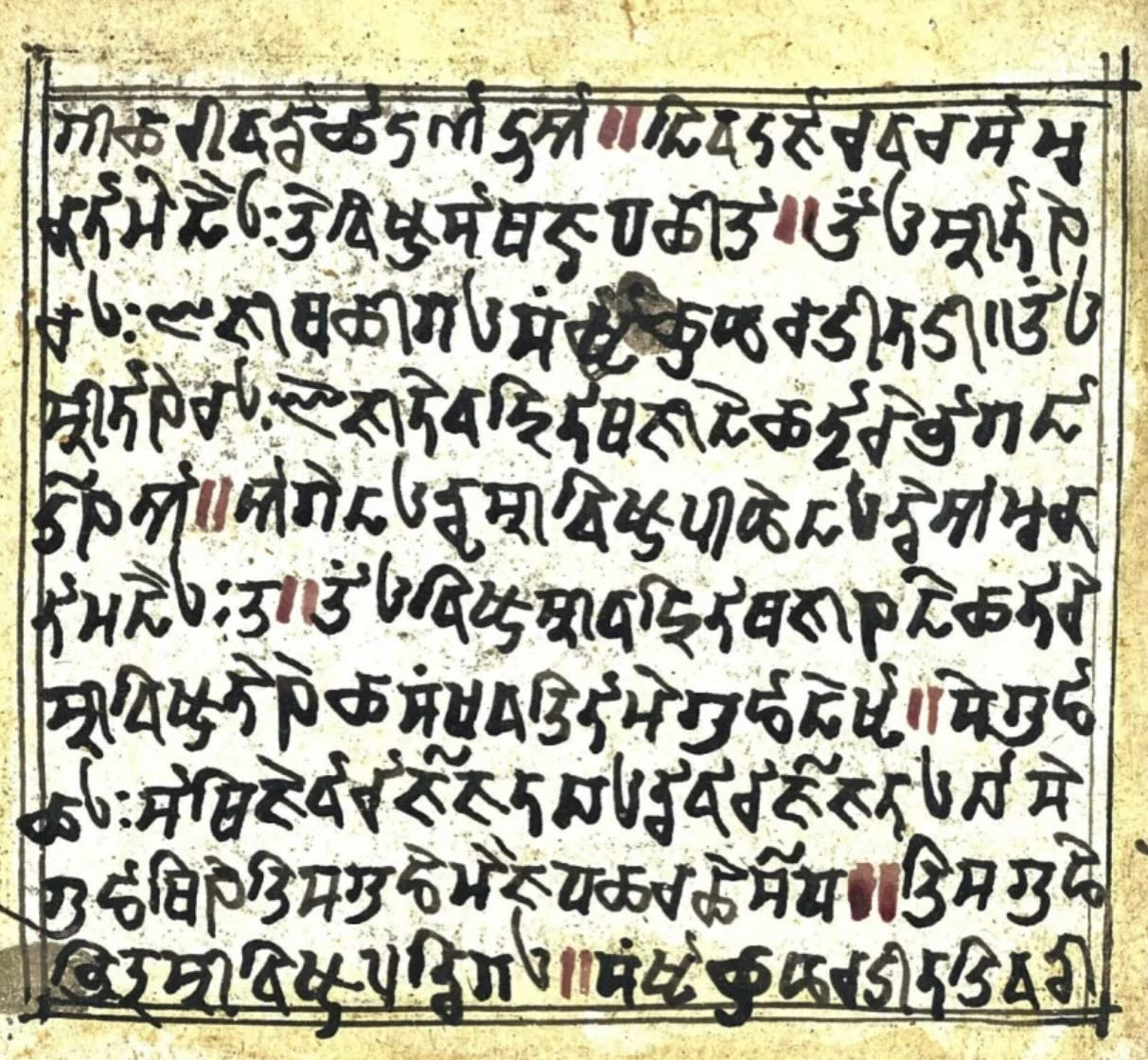
Punjabi-language manuscript of the Ekadashi Mahatam written in a Punjabi variant of Sharada script, ca.1200–1300

The earliest writings in Punjabi belong to the Nath Yogi era from the 9th to the 14th centuries. According to Gurinder Singh Mann et al, these earliest Nath writers consisted of the likes of Gorakh Nath and Charpat Nath. They referred to God with various names such as "Alakh Nirajan" which are still prevalent in Punjabi vernacular. According to Master Tara Singh, the Punjabi poetry authored by Baba Farid, Guru Nanak, and Bhai Gurdas was already at a high-level where subtle ideas could be expressed through a medium of a literary language, therefore Punjabi must have evolved centuries before then, perhaps in the 9th or 10th centuries. In addition to Nath literature, there is indirect evidence of Punjabi bardic literature from this period, although none has been uncovered or preserved. The names of some Punjabi bards who survive in references are Jodha and Vira, Lalla and Behlima, Mahima and Hasana, Rana Kailash and Maldeo, Sikandar and Birham, Tunda and Asraja. The Naths and bards were likely mostly oral traditions rather than literary. Their script was likely Sharada or Nagari. Other claimed authors of this early stage include Puran Bhagat and Shah Shams Sabzvari.

An example of surviving work of an early-stage showcasing Old Punjabi emerging from Apabhraṃśa is a doha couplet dated to 760 by Saraha, a Vajrayana Mahasiddha saint, which is as follows:

Original (Old Punjabi)

Couplet one:
ਜਾਣ ਣ ਆਪ ਜਣਿੱਜਣਿ, ਤਾਵ ਣ ਸਿੱਸ ਕਰੇਇ।
Jāṇa ṇa āpa jaṇijaṇi, tāva ṇa sisa karē'i
ਅੰਧਾ ਅੰਧ ਕਾਢਵ ਤਿਮ, ਵੇਣ ਵਿ ਕੂਵ ਪੜੇਇ॥
Adhā adha kāḍhava tima, vēṇa vi kūva paṛē'i.
ਅਰਥਃ ਜਦ ਤੱਕ ਆਪ ਜਾਣੂ ਨਾ ਹੋਵੋ ਤਦ ਤੱਕ ਕਿਸੇ ਨੂੰ ਸਿੱਸ ਨਾ ਬਣਾਵੋ। ਜੇ ਅੰਨ੍ਹਾ ਅੰਨ੍ਹੇ ਨੂੰ ਖੂਹ ਚੋਂ ਕੱਢੇ ਤਾਂ ਦੋਵੇਂ ਡੁਬਦੇ ਹਨ॥
Arathaਃ jada taka āpa jāṇū nā hōvō tada taka kisē nū sisa nā baṇāvō. Jē anhā anhē nū khūha cōṁ kaḍhē tāṁ dōvēṁ ḍubadē hana.

Couplet two:
ਅੱਖਰ ਬਾਢਾ ਸਅਲ ਜਗੁ, ਣਾਹਿ ਣਿਰੱਖਰ ਕੋਇ।
Akhara bāḍhā sa'ala jagu, ṇāhi ṇirakhara kō'i.
ਤਾਵ ਸੇ ਅੱਖਰ ਘੋਲਿਆ, ਜਾਵ ਣਿਰੱਖਰ ਹੋਇ॥
Tāva sē akhara ghōli'ā, jāva ṇirakhara hō'i
ਅਰਥਃ ਸਾਰਾ ਜਗਤ ਅੱਖਰਾਂ ਨੇ ਬੰਨਿਆਂ ਹੋਇਆ ਹੈ, ਨਿਰੱਖਰ ਕੋਈ ਨਹੀਂ। ਐਸੇ ਅੱਖਰ ਸਿਰਜੋ ਜਿਸ ਰਾਹੀਂ ਨਿਰੱਖਰ “ਅਲੇਖ” ਹੋ ਸਕੀਏ॥
Arathaਃ sārā jagata akharāṁ nē bani'āṁ hō'i'ā hai, nirakhara kō'ī nahīṁ. Aisē akhara sirajō jisa rāhīṁ nirakhara “alēkha” hō sakī'ē.

— Akhara bāḍhā sa'ala jagu (760) by Saraha
Translation:
Summarized translation (English)

Couplet one:
One should not make someone a student until he is aware. If the blind tries to pull the blind out of the well, both of them drown.

Couplet two:
The whole world is bound by letters and there is no single one. Learn such alphabets through which we can write well.

Another early work in a northwestern Apabhramsha precursory to Punjabi and Sindhi is the Sandeśarāsaka by Addahamāṇa (Apabhraṃśa form of the name Abdur Rahman). It is popularly asserted as being written in the 11th century, although it has been dated variously from the 12th to 13th centuries by other scholars.

=== Medieval period ===
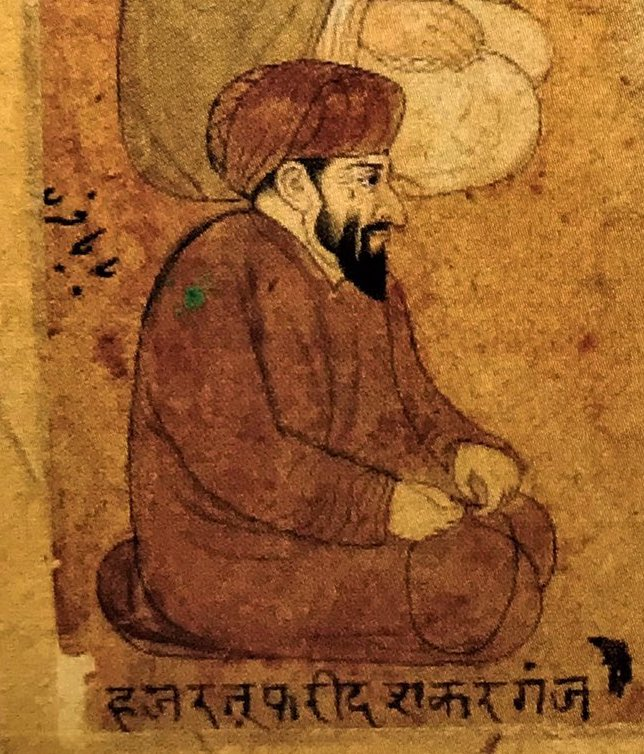
Baba Farid, considered the first major Punjabi poet.

The Punjabi Sufis who wrote in Punjabi rather than Persian were Shaikh Farid (1175–1266), Shaikh Sharaf (c. 1271–1332), Shah Hussain (1539–1599), Bulleh Shah (1680–1758), and Waris Shah (1735–1784). The Punjabi literary tradition is popularly seen to commence with Baba Farid (1173–1266), whose Sufi poetry was compiled after his death in the Adi Granth. However, the author of the Farid verses found within the Guru Granth Sahib is disputed, with some scholars attributing the verses to a later writer named Ibrahim Farid. Amir Khusrau (1253 – 1325), a prominent Indo-Persian poet, is also known to have written a vaar in the Punjabi language. Punjabi literature saw further development between the 15th–16th centuries. Roughly from the 12th century to the 19th century, Punjabi Sufi poetry developed under Shah Hussain (1538–1599), Sultan Bahu (1628–1691), Shah Sharaf (1640–1724), Ali Haider Multani (1690–1785), Bulleh Shah (1680–1757), Saleh Muhammad Safoori (1747–1826), Mian Muhammad Baksh (1830–1907) and Khwaja Ghulam Farid (1845–1901). In contrast to Persian poets, who had preferred the ghazal for poetic expression, Punjabi Sufi poets tended to compose in the Kafi. Another literary genre developed by the Sufis was siharfi. The Farid verses found within the Sikh scriptures may have been written by a Punjabi Sufi named Farid Sani (1450–1552/1554). Perso-Arabic script became used for writing Punjabi by the early 17th century, which was later standardised as Shahmukhi.

Punjabi literature also developed under the Sikh gurus and later Sikh authors. They wrote mostly using Gurmukhi script from the early 16th century onwards. Guru Nanak was one of the first major Punjabi poets. Guru Nanak himself composed Punjabi verse incorporating vocabulary from Sanskrit, Arabic, Persian, and other South Asian languages as characteristic of the Gurbani tradition. Under the Sikhs, early Punjabi prose literature evolved with the janamsakhi, sakhi, parchai, and goshti genres. Examples of early prose works include the Ekadashi Mahatam and the Puratan Janamsakhi. The Janamsakhis, stories on the life and legend of Guru Nanak (1469–1539), are early examples of Punjabi prose literature. Chandar Bhan Brahman was a major 16th century Punjabi and Persian poet and prose writer. In 1588/1589, a Muslim scholar Abdī Kodhan wrote a treatise on Islam in Punjabi under the title of rīsālā e mēhndī to be taught in Nizamiyya madrasas. Another important prose writer from the 16th century was Abdullah Lahori, who wrote Bāra Anva. The Vars of Bhai Gurdas employ the Punjabi language in a series of stanzas, known as pauṛīs. In the early 17th century, Guru Arjan collected various works and compiled the Ād Granth. Other Sikh writers include Bhai Mani Singh and Sewa Singh. In around 1650, Jasoda Nandan wrote a Ramayana episode called Lava Kush Dia Pauria.

In the 18th and early 19th centuries, oral traditions, folklore, and ballads by bards were recorded in writing as romance tales, such as Raja Rasalu, Puran Bhagat, Heer-Ranjha, Mirza-Sahiba, Sohni-Mahiwal, Sassi-Pannu, and Yusuf-Zulaikha. Punjabi Sufi poetry also influenced other Punjabi literary traditions particularly the Punjabi Qissa, a genre of romantic tragedy which also derived inspiration from Indic, Persian and Quranic sources. The Qissa of Heer Ranjha by Waris Shah (1706–1798) is among the most popular of Punjabi qisse. Other popular stories include Sohni Mahiwal by Fazal Shah, Mirza Sahiba by Hafiz Barkhudar (1658–1707), Sassi Punnun by Hashim Shah (1735?–1843?), and Qissa Puran Bhagat by Qadaryar (1802–1892).

Heroic ballads known as Vaar enjoy a rich oral tradition in Punjabi. Prominent examples of heroic or epic poetry include Guru Gobind Singh's Chandi di Var (1666–1708), Najabat's semi-historical Nadir Shah Di Vaar describing the invasion of India by Nadir Shah in 1739, Agra Sethi's account on the martyrdom of Haqiqat Rai, and the Chatthian di Vaar describing the struggle between the Chatthas and the Sukerchakia Misl. The Jangnama, or 'War Chronicle,' was introduced into Punjabi literature during the Mughal period; the Punjabi Jangnama of Shah Mohammad (1780–1862) recounts the First Anglo-Sikh War of 1845–46. Another popular Jangnama was authored by Hamid Shah in the 18th century.

Sikh literature is more comparable to the literary traditions of other religions of the subcontinent, rather than being analogous to Punjabi literature, which is a regional-language literary tradition. Although usually employing Gurmukhi script, the corpus of Sikh texts utilize various languages aside from Punjabi proper, namely belonging to New Indo-Aryan, such as Saraiki, Khariboli, and Braj. Thus, the situation for Sikh literature is comparable to the literary tradition of the subcontinental Ismailis. Non-religious works were authored by Isar Das, Kisen Singh Arif, Hidayatullah, and Muhammad Boota.

=== Colonial period ===
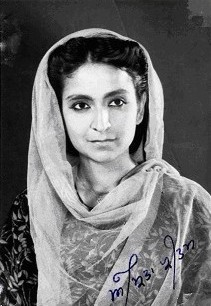
Amrita Pritam

Illustrated cover folio of a handwritten Punjabi Manuscript from 1879

With the onset of colonial rule, Urdu was adopted in the province for administrative and educational purposes. Urdu became favoured by the Muslims while Hindi was supported by Hindus. The introduction of the printing-press to the Punjab by the colonial-administration was to suppress the Punjabi language written in Gurmukhi script, which was seen as being associated with the Sikhs. Thus, printing in Urdu in Perso-Arabic script became favoured by the colonial government. The first Punjabi printing press (using Gurmukhi font) was established through a Christian mission at Ludhiana in 1835, and the first Punjabi dictionary was published by Reverend J. Newton in 1854. At some educational institutions, such as the University of the Punjab, Lahore, Punjabi was offered as a field of study.

The British colonial-administration produced quarterly catalogue reports of the books officially registered and published in Punjab, under Act XXV of 1867 and Act X of 1890. The Victorian novel, Elizabethan drama, free verse and Modernism entered Punjabi literature through the introduction of British education during the Raj. From the 1890s, the development of a Modern Standard Punjabi started occurring, with it arising in around 1900. It was promoted and utilized by Sikh reformers and authors, later becoming the standard form of Punjabi used in Punjab, India after independence.

The period of Punjab literature between 1880–1900 is termed "the age of inauguration". Topics included communalism, colonialism, language, and Sikh topics. The Singh Sabha movement that began in the 1870s, the establishment of Punjabi-language newspapers in the 1880s and later magazines, and the formation of the Wazir-i-Hind Press in Amritsar in 1891 and the foundation of the Khalsa Tract Society in 1894 ushered in a new era of Punjabi literature written in Gurmukhi script. Between 1900 and 1948 was an age of modern Punjabi writing. Topics such as Sikh identity formation, politics, reform, reconsolidation, and communal regeneration were prevalent. Some other topics were women, gender, health, and sexuality. The first modern novels in Hindi and Punjabi were written in Punjab, namely the Bhagyavati (1877) by Shardha Ram Phillauri and Sundari (1898) by Vir Singh. Bhai Vir Singh is attributed as the founder of modern Punjabi literature, with him having authored poetry, religious biographies, historical works, and novels in the language. Other notable and contemporary writers include Kripa Singh (1879–1939), Dhani Ram Chatrik, and Puran Singh. Puran Singh was a prolific essayist. Poets included Amrita Pritam, Mohan Singh Mahir, and Pritam Singh Safeer. Playwrights and storytellers included Ishwar Chander Nanda and Gurbaksh Singh. Other writers included Nanak Singh, Sant Singh Sekhon, Gopal Singh Dardi, Kartar Singh Duggal, Kulwant Singh Virk, Hardayal Singh.

The colonial British administrators and Christian missionaries commissioned a number of literary works, first examining the political and socio-religious history of the Sikhs and later on the structure and lexis of the Punjabi language. In 1811, the Serampore Mission Press translated the New Testament into Gurmukhi Punjabi. The Ludhiana Mission Press was also active.

==== Commercial books ====
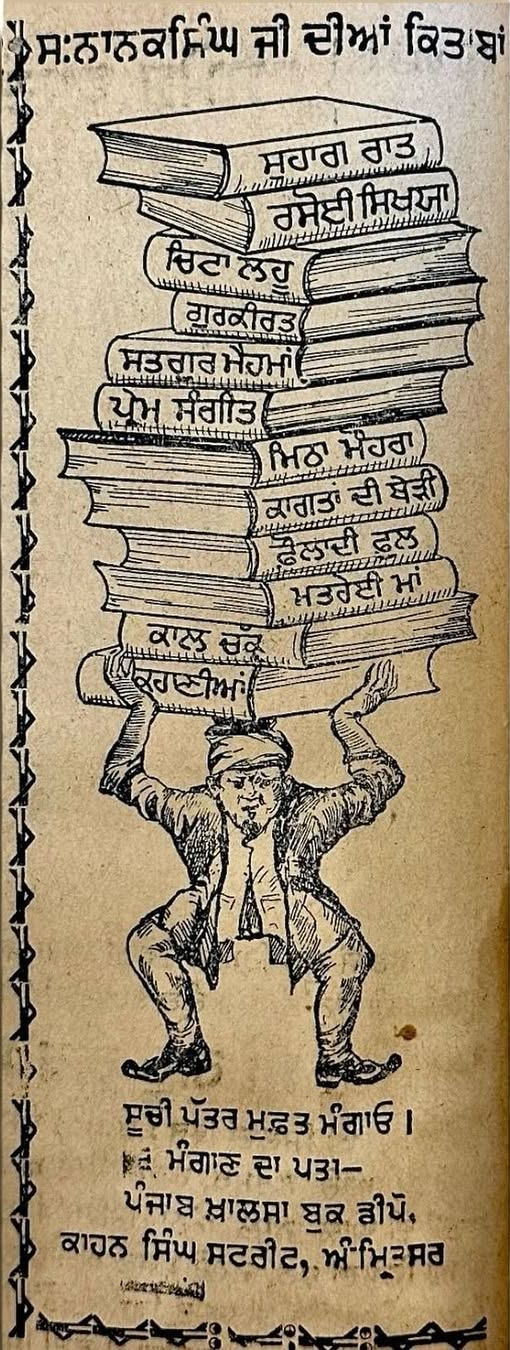
Punjabi advertisement for books authored by Nanak Singh, 'Phulwari' magazine, January 1933 issue

During the British period in Punjab, the most popular literary language based on the number book produced in it was Urdu, however Punjabi-language books were a close second.

Whilst a few Punjabi lithograph texts may have been produced prior to 1850, Punjabi commercial book publishing began to arise after 1850, slowly increasing in prominence until the 1870s and 1880s, when thousands of them were being produced and distributed, written in both Gurmukhi and Perso-Arabic scripts. One of the earliest commercial Punjabi books on record is an 1851 edition of Waris Shah's Heer Ranjha version produced by the Chashm-i-Nur Press of Lahore. Not much is known about Punjabi books before 1867, the year the administration began compiling reports on vernacular publishing. However, the publishing and distribution of Punjabi books until 1867 was extremely limited, with only twelve books being registered by then at Lahore. Amongst these early Punjabi books, most are government publications but one example of a fictional, commercial work does exist. The fictional work is Sussipoonoo-ki-kissa (ca.1866–67), a qissa of the Sassi Pannu folktale.

The Punjabi novel developed through Nanak Singh (1897–1971) and Vir Singh. Starting off as a pamphleteer and as part of the Singh Sabha Movement, Vir Singh wrote historical romance through such novels as Sundari, Satwant Kaur and Baba Naudh Singh, whereas Nanak Singh helped link the novel to the storytelling traditions of Qissa and oral tradition as well as to questions of social reform. Vir Singh developed the Punjabi historical fiction genre with his four novels Sundari (1898), Bijay Singh (1899), Satwant Kaur (1900), and Baba Naudh Singh (serialized from October 1917 to December 1921), with the novel genre being imported from Europe. Vir Singh's newfound Punjabi novel genre helped promote Sikh code of conduct in the background of the Singh Sabha movement, focusing on themes of Sikh sacrifice, martyrdom, symbolism, conversion, rites, resilience, and survival during the Mughal and British periods.

The novels, short stories and poetry of Amrita Pritam (1919–2005) highlighted, among other themes, the experience of women, and the Partition of India. Punjabi poetry during the British Raj moreover began to explore more the experiences of the common man and the poor through the work of Puran Singh (1881–1931). Other poets meanwhile, such as Dhani Ram Chatrik (1876–1957), Diwan Singh (1897–1944) and Ustad Daman (1911–1984), explored and expressed nationalism in their poetry during and after the Indian freedom movement. Chatrik's poetry, steeped in Indian traditions of romance and classical poetry, often celebrated varied moods of nature in his verse as well as feelings of patriotism. Brought up on English and American poetry, Puran Singh was also influenced by Freudian psychology in his oftentimes unabashedly sensuous poetry.

Modernism was also introduced into Punjabi poetry by Prof. Mohan Singh (1905–78) and Shareef Kunjahi. The Punjabi diaspora also began to emerge during the Raj and also produced poetry whose theme was revolt against British rule in Ghadar di Gunj (Echoes of Mutiny).

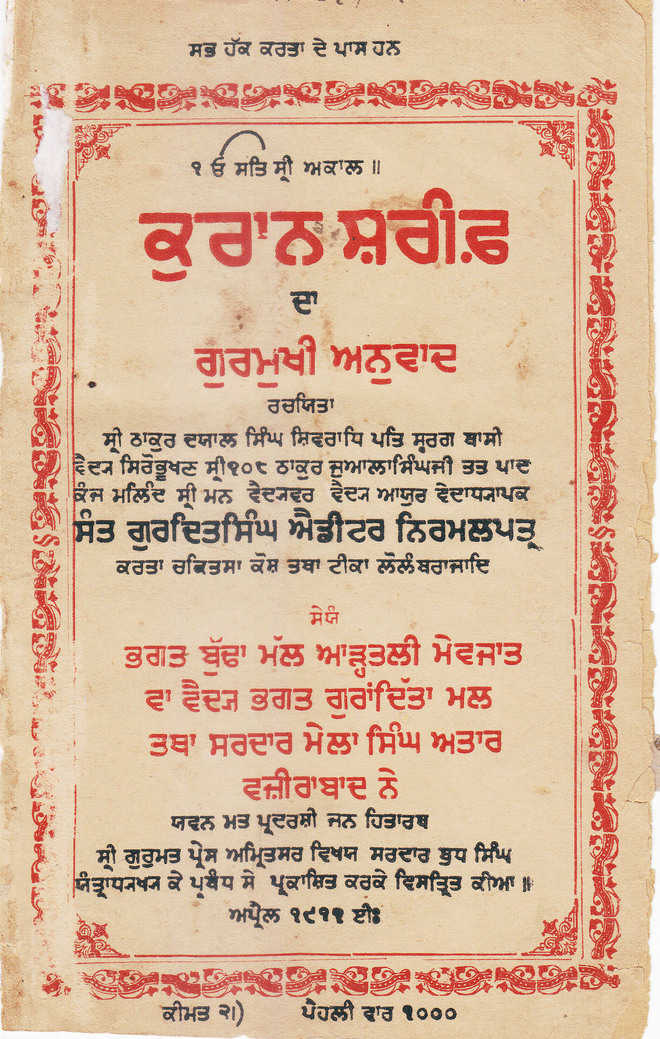
Title-page of 'Quran Sharif', a Punjabi (in Gurmukhi) translation of the Quran, Shri Gurmat Press, Amritsar, April 1911

In April 1911, the first Punjabi translation (in Gurmukhi) of the Quran was published by the Shri Gurmat Press, Amritsar. The work of translating the Quran from Arabic to Punjabi was carried out by a Nirmala Sikh scholar named Sant Vaidya Gurdit Singh Alomhari. The printing of the Quran was sponsored by two Hindus, Bhagat Buddhamal Aadatli and Vaidya Bhagat Guranditta, and one Sikh, Sardar Mela Singh Attar (of Wazirabad).

==== Tract literature ====
The genre of Punjabi tract literature arose in the late-19th century and played a vital role in Punjabi socio-religious reforms and engaging in refutation and criticism of religious rivals. The tracts produced tended to be anywhere from one to at-most sixteen pages in-length. Some notable Sikh tract societies include the Khalsa Tract Society (est. 1894), the Panch Khalsa Society, and the Sikh Handbill Society. Norman Gerald Barrier estimated that Sikh organizations had produced 1,200 tracts between the years 1880 and 1915 that represented varying views and positions. Sikh organizations were proficient in this genre of literature but Hindu and Muslim organization also produced Punjabi tracts. Some religious sects and organizations that churned out tracts include the Arya Samaj, Ahmadis, and various Muslim anjuman organizations. Punjabi tracts of the era breached upon various topics, such as caste, religion, conversion, diet, and intoxicants.

==== Debates with Hindi proponents ====
In a series of letters debating Arya Samajists such as Lala Lajpat Rai, Master Tara Singh rebuked the idea proposed by the Arya Samaj that Punjabi was a "child" of the "mother", Hindi, by stating that Punjabi literature predates the appearance of Hindi. The Arya Samaj proposed that the Ramayan of Tulsi Das (fl. 16th and 17th centuries) and the works of Chand Bardai (fl. 12th century), were examples of early Hindi literature. This was refuted as the language used in these works is strictly-speaking not Hindi, as per J. S. Grewal. Until the end of the 17th century, no Hindi literature had arisen. Punjabi literature had an early claim to the compositions of Baba Farid in the 13th century as an example, predating the development of Hindi literature by several centuries. Lala Lajpat Rai objected to the contemporary Khalsa Party's development of Punjabi literature, claiming it was an objectionable "mixture" (khichṛī) that borrowed words from English, Arabic, and Sanskrit. Tara Singh responded that Hindi freely borrowed words from other languages and therefore there is nothing wrong with Punjabi also adopting loanwords from external languages. Tara Singh further stated that Punjabi derives from Prakrit, which inherited countless words from Sanskrit that were employed and developed in various ways. Tara Singh called attention to the fact that Muslim polities had ruled the Punjab for a period of 900-years, and that it was only natural from the inhabitants of the area to adopt words from Persian and Arabic as a result. Lala Lajpat Rai wanted all non-Indic words to be replaced with Sanskrit words, Tara Singh responded that this was "narrow-minded partisanship" and "fanatical prejudice". Tara Singh highlighted that Hindi itself was born out of Shauraseni Prakrit, which in-turn derived from Sanskrit, making its story of development ordinary and similar to other regional languages of northern India, meaning it could not claim special status based on its origin. Tara Singh claimed that Lala Lajpat Rai's true objective was to "banish Punjabi from the land of its birth".

=== Post-Independence ===
==== Western Punjab (Pakistan) ====
In Pakistan, some modern Punjabi authors include Ahmad Rahi, Munir Niazi, Najm Hosain Syed, and Ahmad Salim. Shahmukhi script is used. Some writers like Joshua Fazal Din and Miran Bakhsh Minhas, who wrote Punjabi novels before partition, continued their writing career after the independence of Pakistan in 1947, while new authors emerged, such as Mohammad Bakir and Abdul Majeed Bhatti.

Najm Hosain Syed, Fakhar Zaman and Afzal Ahsan Randhawa are some of the more prominent names in West Punjabi literature produced in Pakistan since 1947. Some other lesser-known but influential fiction writers from Pakistan's Punjab include Saleem Khan Gimmi, Zafar Lashari, Ismail Ahmadani, Razia Noor Mohammad, Raja Mohammad Ahmed, Nadim Asari, Kehkshan Malik, Muneer Ahmed Alvi, and Ehsan Batalvi, among many others. Literary criticism in Punjabi has also emerged through the efforts of West Punjabi scholars and poets, Shafqat Tanvir Mirza and Ahmad Salim.

The work of Zaman and Randhawa often treats the rediscovery of Punjabi identity and language in Pakistan since 1947. Ali's short story collection Kahani Praga received the Waris Shah Memorial Award in 2005 from the Pakistan Academy of Letters. Mansha Yaad also received the Waris Shah Award for his collection Wagda Paani in 1987, and again in 1998 for his novel Tawan TawaN Tara, as well as the Tamgha-e-Imtiaz (Pride of Performance) in 2004. The most critically successful writer in recent times has been Mir Tanha Yousafi who has won the Massod Khaddar Posh Trust Award 4 times, and has had his books transliterated into Gurmukhi for Indian Punjabi readers.

Urdu poets of the Punjab have also written Punjabi poetry including Munir Niazi (1928–2006). The poet who introduced new trends in Punjabi poetry is Pir Hadi Abdul Mannan. Though a Punjabi poet, he also wrote poetry in Urdu.

Ali Arshad Mir was an epic poet whose works gave voice to the voiceless - the downtrodden and the oppressed, his role is considered crucial in 20th century Punjabi literature.

Some Punjabi-language writers also wrote PTV dramas or had their works adapted as television series, such as Munnu Bhai whose PTV classic drama Sona Chandi (1982), while in Urdu language, is considered to be a representative of Punjabi culture.

In 2025, Lahore-based Punjabi-language writer Zubair Ahmad stated that a literary renaissance in Punjabi literature began in Pakistan during the 1960s, particularly in the genre of short stories. He estimated that between 300 and 400 Punjabi short story books have been published in the country.

==== Eastern Punjab (India) ====
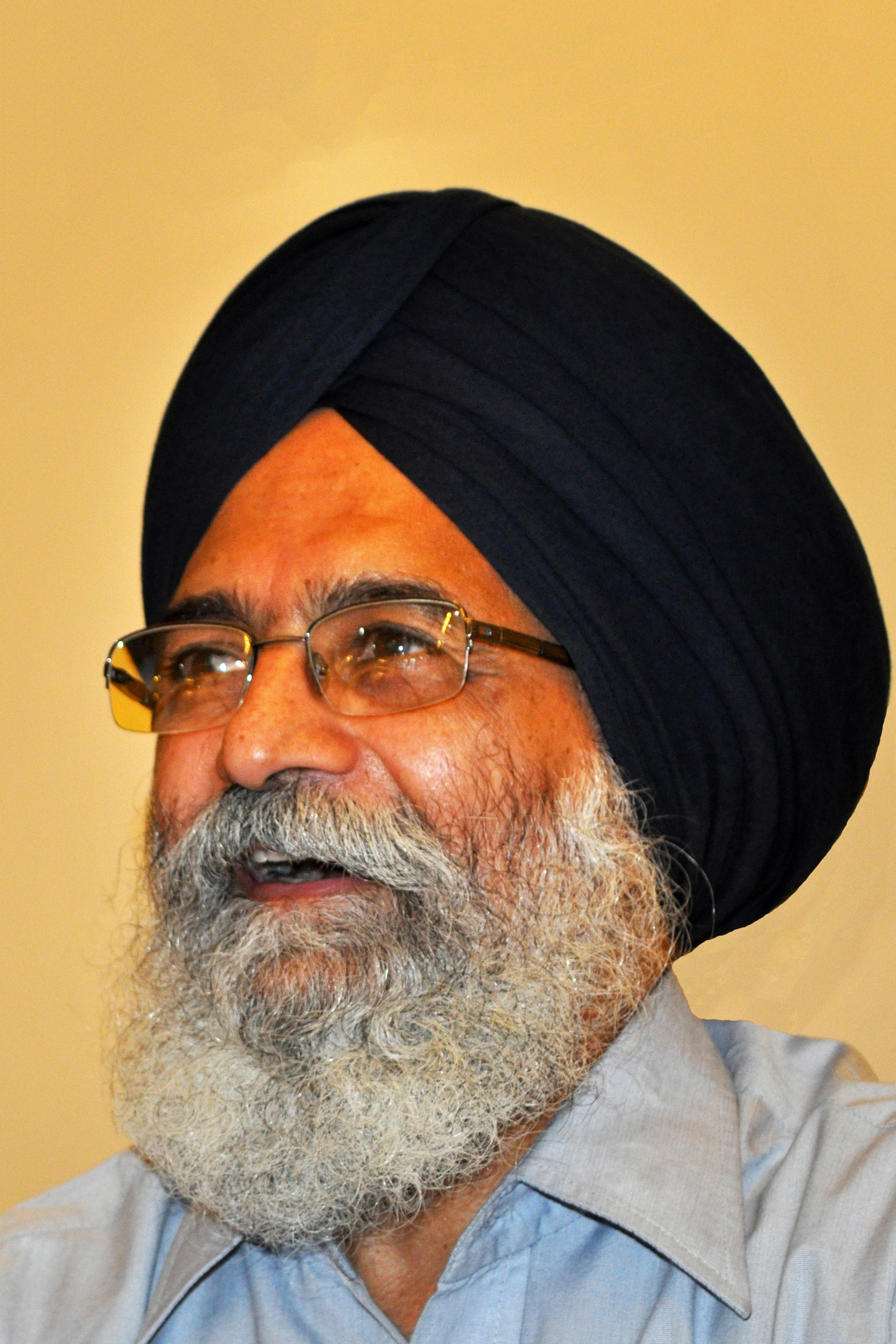
Dr. Surjit Patar, a prominent Punjabi writer, poet and lecturer at Guru Nanak Dev University

In India, Punjabi is cultivated as a literary language by a number of educational institutions and a government department. Between 1961–1981, an estimated 5,282 Punjabi works were published in Punjab, Haryana, Rajasthan, Uttar Pradesh, Chandigarh, and Delhi. Furthermore, there were 27 newspapers and 671 magazines and journals in Punjabi.

Amrita Pritam (1919–2005), Jaswant Singh Rahi (1930–1996), Shiv Kumar Batalvi (1936–1973), Surjit Patar (1944–) and Pash (1950–1988) are some of the more prominent poets and writers of East Punjab (India). Gurmukhi script is used, which holds official status in the state. Pritam's Sunehre (Messages) received the Sahitya Akademi in 1982. In it, Pritam explores the impact of social morality on women, but also an insight into women's mentality. Kumar's epic Luna (a dramatic retelling of the legend of Puran Bhagat) won the Sahitya Akademi Award in 1965, Luna was a revolutionary step where kumar supported luna instead of idealizing puran bhagat. Socialist themes of revolution meanwhile influenced writers like Pash whose work demonstrates the influence of Pablo Neruda and Octavio Paz.

Punjabi fiction in modern times has explored themes in modernist and post-modernist literature. Punjabi culture. Moving from the propagation of Sikh thought and ideology to the themes of the Progressive Movement, the short story in Punjabi was taken up by Nanak Singh, Charan Singh Shaheed, Joshua Fazal Deen, and Heera Singh Dard. Women writers such as Ajeet Cour and Dalip Kaur Tiwana meanwhile have questioned cultural patriarchy and the subordination of women in their work. Ajeet Cour's literature represents women from a very different and bold perspective, distancing herself from her contemporaries. Her writings and feminism suggested is very different than that of her contemporary writers, especially women. She is known for her bold and indomitable attitude, she wrote on humanist themes and also on the themes of Man-Woman relationships and the place of women in them. Her stories are surreal, creating a lasting impact on readers. Hardev Grewal has introduced a new genere to Punjabi fiction called Punjabi Murder Mystery in 2012 with his Punjabi novel Eh Khudkushi Nahin Janab! Qatl Hai (published by Lahore Books). Kulwant Singh Virk (1921–1987) won the Sahitya Akedemi award for his collection of short stories Nave Lok in 1967. His stories are gripping and provide deep insight into the rural and urban modern Punjab. He has been hailed as the “emperor of Punjabi short stories”.

Modern Punjab drama developed through Ishwar Nanda's Ibsen-influenced Suhag in 1913, and Gursharan Singh who helped popularize the genre through live theatre in Punjabi villages. Sant Singh Sekhon, Kartar Singh Duggal, and Balwant Gargi have written plays, and Atamjit Singh was awarded the Sahitya Akademi Award in 2010 (which he returned in 2015) for his play Tatti Tawi De Vich.

== Preservation of Punjabi literature ==
Panjab Digital Library (PDL) is a significant initiative in preserving and providing access to Punjabi literature, manuscripts, and historical documents. Established in 2003, the library has digitized over 65 million pages related to Sikh and Punjabi culture. Its mission is to locate, digitize, preserve, and make accessible the accumulated wisdom of the Punjab region, without distinction as to script, language, religion, nationality, or other physical conditions. PDL has contributed significantly to the accessibility and preservation of Punjabi literature, making it available to a wider audience and ensuring its continuity for future generations. In May 2025, an audio library was launched in Chandigarh under the purview of Balraj Pannu to preserve Punjabi culture and literature, with 700 audio-books made available and a further 300 planned.

== Diasporic Punjabi literature ==
Punjabi diaspora literature has developed through writers in the United Kingdom, Canada, Australia, and the United States, as well as writers in Africa such as Ajaib Kamal, born in 1932 in Kenya, and Mazhar Tirmazi, writer of famous song "Umraan Langhiyan Pabhan Bhaar." Themes explored by diaspora writers include the cross-cultural experience of Punjabi migrants, racial discrimination, exclusion, and assimilation, the experience of women in the diaspora, and spirituality in the modern world. Second generation writers of Punjabi ancestry such as Rupinderpal Singh Dhillon (writes under the name Roop Dhillon) have explored the relationship between British Punjabis and their immigrant parents as well as experiment with surrealism, science fiction and crime fiction). Bhupinder kaur Sadhaura (1971–) have biography of peer Budhu Shah Ji, book name is Guru Bhagat Peer Budhu Shah (honoured by Haryana Punjabi Sahitya Academy ). Other known writers include Sadhu Binning and Ajmer Rode (Canada), Mazhar Tirmazi, Amarjit Chandan, Avtar Singh Sandhu (Paash) (1950–1988) and Surjit Kalsi.

== Genres ==
Currently Punjabi writing can be split between the following genres:

- Punjabi Qissa (Waris Shah)
- Traditional poetry (Surjit Paatar)
- Naxalite poetry (Paash, Amarjit Chandan)
- Lyrical poetry (Rajvinder Singh)
- Punjabi haiku (Amarjit Chandan)
- Yatharthvaad (Realism)
- Pachmi Paryatharvaad (Surreal, Fantasy, Imaginative) Roop Dhillon
- Parvasi (émigré) Sadhu Binning
- Viang (Satire) Jagjit Singh Komal

== See also ==
- List of Punjabi authors
- List of Punjabi language poets
- Panjab Digital Library
