= Uganda Ludo Association =

National governing body for Ludo in Uganda

- Sport: Ludo
- Jurisdiction: Uganda
- Founded: 2005
- Regional affiliation: Africa
- Headquarters: Kampala, Uganda
- Chairman: Hussein Kalule
- Secretary: Faisal Katumba
- (Uganda)

The Uganda Ludo Association (ULA) is the national governing body for the game of Ludo in Uganda. It is recognized by the National Council of Sports (Uganda) and is affiliated with the African Ludo Federation and the World Ludo Federation. The association is responsible for organizing domestic competitions, developing the game at grassroots level, and managing the Uganda national ludo team.

== History ==
The Uganda Ludo Association was established in the early 2000s to provide formal organization to a game that had long been popular in both rural and urban communities across Uganda. ULA was officially registered with the National Council of Sports in 2005, granting it status as a recognized national sports federation.

== Structure and Governance ==
ULA operates under a constitution and is led by an elected executive committee, including a president, vice president, general secretary, treasurer, and other officials. Its headquarters are in Kampala.

== Activities ==
The association oversees and promotes the development of ludo in Uganda through:

- Organizing the annual National Ludo League and national championships.
- Grassroots programs to encourage youth participation.
- Selection and training of the national ludo team for international tournaments.
- Community outreach projects using ludo as a platform for social engagement.

== Achievements ==
- Uganda has competed in the African Ludo Championships under the administration of ULA.
- The association is credited with standardizing the rules of ludo in Uganda in line with international standards.

== See also ==
- Sport in Uganda
- Chaupur
