= Puran Bhagat =

Prince of Sialkot

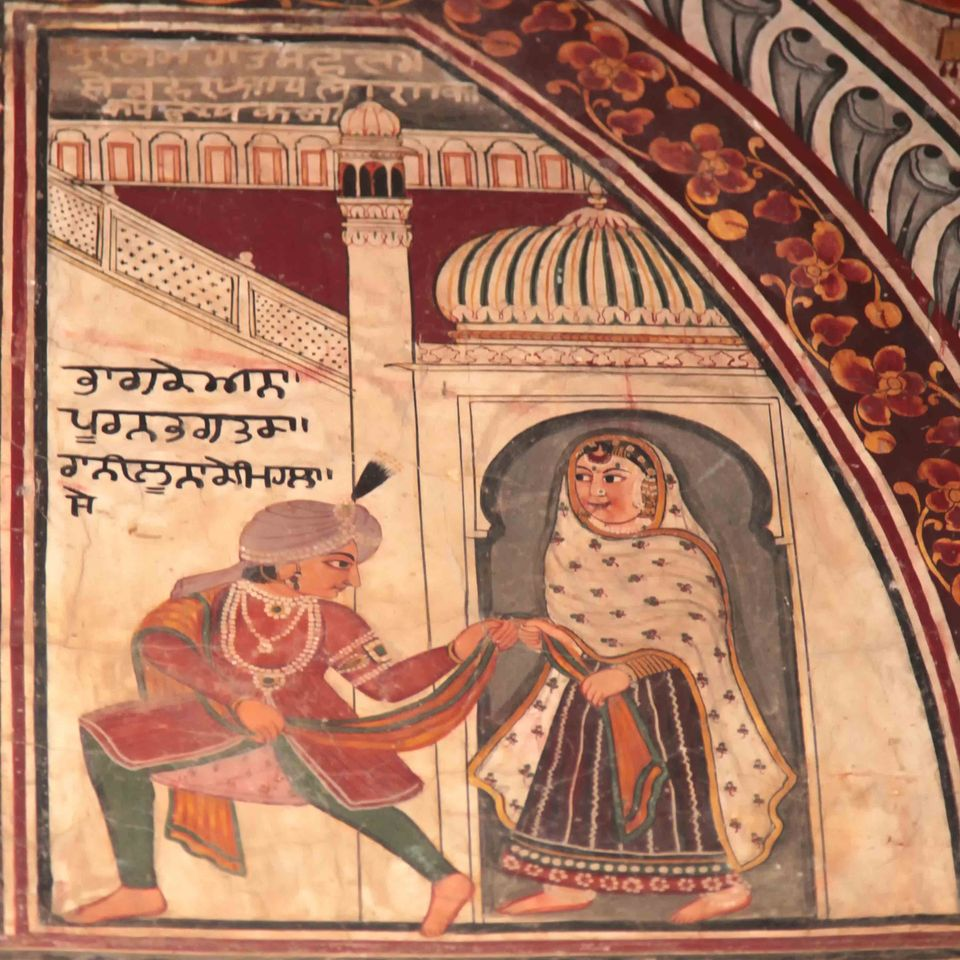
- Depiction of the folk legend of Puran Bhagat from the centre of the Gangetic Plains, with inscriptions in both Gurmukhi and Devanagari scripts

Personal life
- Parent: Salivahana of Sialkot (father)
- Known for: Hatha yoga
- Other name: Chaurangi Nath
- Honors: Navnatha

Religious life
- Religion: Hinduism
- Philosophy: Hatha yoga
- Sect: Nath Sampradaya (sect of Shaivism)

Religious career
- Teacher: Gorakhnath

Puran Bhagat (later became Sri Chauranginatha) is one of the Navnatha (Nine Saints) of Natha Sampradaya and mythical prince of Sialkot from Punjabi folklore. According to the story, he was son of King Salban of Sialkot and an elder brother of prince Rasalu. A popular rendition on the legend of Puran Bhagat was recorded by the Sufi poet Qadir Yar.

== Background ==
Puran was born to Queen Ichhira, the first wife of king Raja Sálbán. Upon the suggestion of the astrologers, Puran was sent away from the King for the first 12 years of his life. It was said that King could not see the face of his son. While Puran was away, the King married a young girl named Luna, who came from a low caste family. After 12 years of isolation, Puran returned to the royal palace. There, Luna became romantically attracted toward Puran, who was of the same age. Being the step-son of Luna, Puran disapproved of her advances. A hurt Luna accused Puran of violating her honor.

Puran was ordered to be amputated and killed. The soldiers cutoff his hands and legs and threw him in a well in the forest. One day Guru Gorakhnath were passing by with his followers and heard voice from the well. He took him out using a single thread and unbaked earthen pot. He was later adopted by Baba Gorkhnath. Puran himself became a yogi.

== Worship ==
Puran also known as Baba Sahaj Nath Ji, is the supreme head of the Jandiyals, a Hindu caste. The Jandiyals gather twice a year on Guru Purnima and worship Puran Bhagat. The temple of Bawa Sahaj Nath Ji is located in Pakistan, but after partition, the Jandiyals constructed a temple in Jandi near Heeranagar, Jammu, and in Talab tillo (Jammu), another temple is in Taragarh near Dinanagar where Sharma's including Khajuria's gather twice year and a fourth one is in Dorangla.

Jandiyal families who came from Pakistan bought that temple's sand and used it to construct a small temple in Taragarh. People from all over India come here on Guru Purnima for Darshan.

In addition to the Targarh temple, Jandiyals (Mahajan) have built temples at Agra, Jammu, and Udhampur (J&K). Udhampur city is also known as Devika Nagri. The temple is located at Bypass Road, Fangyal. Jandiyal biradari celebrates and worships Baba Sehaj Nath ji twice a year on Budh Purnima and Kartik Purnima.

== In popular culture ==
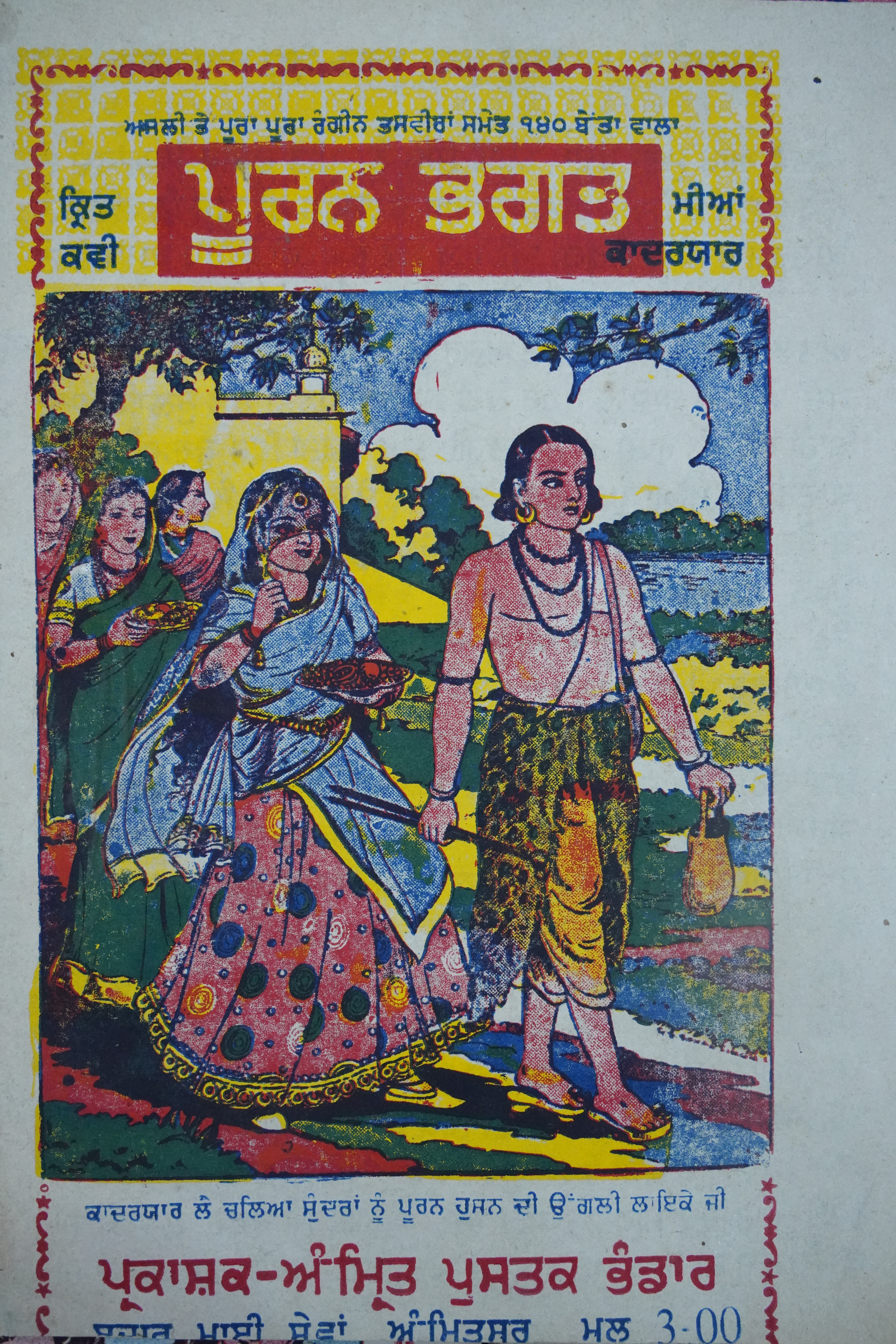
An edition of Punjabi qissa Puran Bhagat written by Qadir Yar.

A number of Indian films have been made on the legend of Puran Bhagat. These include: Puran Bhagat (1928) by Pesi Karani, Puran Bhagat (1933) by Debaki Bose, Bhakta Puran (1949) by Chaturbhuj Doshi, Bhakta Puran (1952) by Dhirubhai Desai.

Loona (1965), is an epic verse play based on the legend of Puran Bhagat by Shiv Kumar Batalvi, now considered a masterpiece in modern Punjabi literature, and which also created a new genre, of modern Punjabi kissa. Though Loona is portrayed as a villain in the legend, Batalvi created the epic around her agony which caused her to become a villain. Batalvi became the youngest recipient of the Sahitya Akademi Award in 1967 for Loona.

Punjabi writer Puran Singh wrote a poem about Puran Bhagat.

== See also ==
- Puran's Well
- Natha
