= Shiv Kumar Batalvi =

Indian poet (1937–1973)

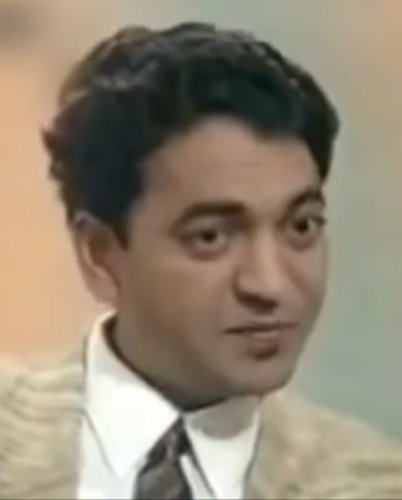
- Shiv Kumar Batalvi during an interview with the BBC in 1970
- Born: Shiv Kumar; 23 July 1936; Old district Sialkot current narowalBarapind, Punjab Province, British India (now in Punjab, Pakistan)
- Died: 6 May 1973 (aged 36); Kiri Mangyal, Punjab, India
- Occupations: Poet, singer, author, playwright, lyricist & a banker
- Spouse: Aruna Batalvi
- Writing career
- Language: Punjabi
- Period: 1960–1973
- Genres: poetry, prose, play
- Subjects: Pathos, passion,
- Notable work: Loona (1965)
- Notable awards: Youngest recipient of Sahitya Akademi Award
- Movement: Romanticism

Shiv Kumar (23 July 1936 – 6 May 1973), better known by his pen name Shiv Kumar Batalvi, was an Indian poet, writer and playwright of the Punjabi language. He was most known for his romantic poetry, noted for its heightened passion, pathos, separation and lover's agony.

He became the youngest recipient of the Sahitya Akademi Award in 1967, given by the Sahitya Akademi (India's National Academy of Letters), for his epic verse play based on the ancient legend of Puran Bhagat, Loona (1965), now considered a masterpiece in modern Punjabi literature, and which also created a new genre, of modern Punjabi kissa. Today, his poetry stands in equal footing, amongst that by stalwarts of modern Punjabi poetry, like Mohan Singh and Amrita Pritam, all of whom are popular on both sides of Indo-Pakistan border.

== Biography ==
=== Early life and education ===
Shiv Kumar Batalvi was born on 23 July 1936 (though a few documents related to him state 8 October 1937) in the village Bara Pind Lohtian in the Shakargarh Tehsil of Gurdaspur District (now in Narowal District of Punjab, Pakistan) into a Punjabi Hindu family to father, Pandit Krishan Gopal Sharma, the village tehsildar in the revenue department, and mother, Shanti Devi, a housewife.

In 1947, when he was aged 11, his family moved to Batala after the partition of India, from where he would later adopt his pen name Batalvi. His father continued his work as a patwari and young Shiv received his primary education. Allegedly, he was a dreamy child, often vanishing for the duration of the day, to be found lying under trees by the riverbank close to the Hindu temple outside the village, lost in a brown reverie. He appears to have been fascinated by local renditions of the Hindu epic Ramayana, as well as wandering minstrel singers, snake charmers and the like – which feature as metaphors in his poetry, giving it a uniquely rural flavour.

He completed his matriculation in 1953 at Panjab University, and enrolled in the F.Sc. program at Baring Union Christian College, Batala, though before completing his degree he moved to S. N. College, Qadian, where he joined the arts program more suited to his persona, though he left that too in the second year. Thereafter he joined a school at Baijnath, Himachal Pradesh to do a diploma in civil engineering. Here again, he left it in the middle. Next he studied for some time at Govt. Ripudaman College, Nabha.

=== Youngest recipient of Sahitya Akademi Award ===
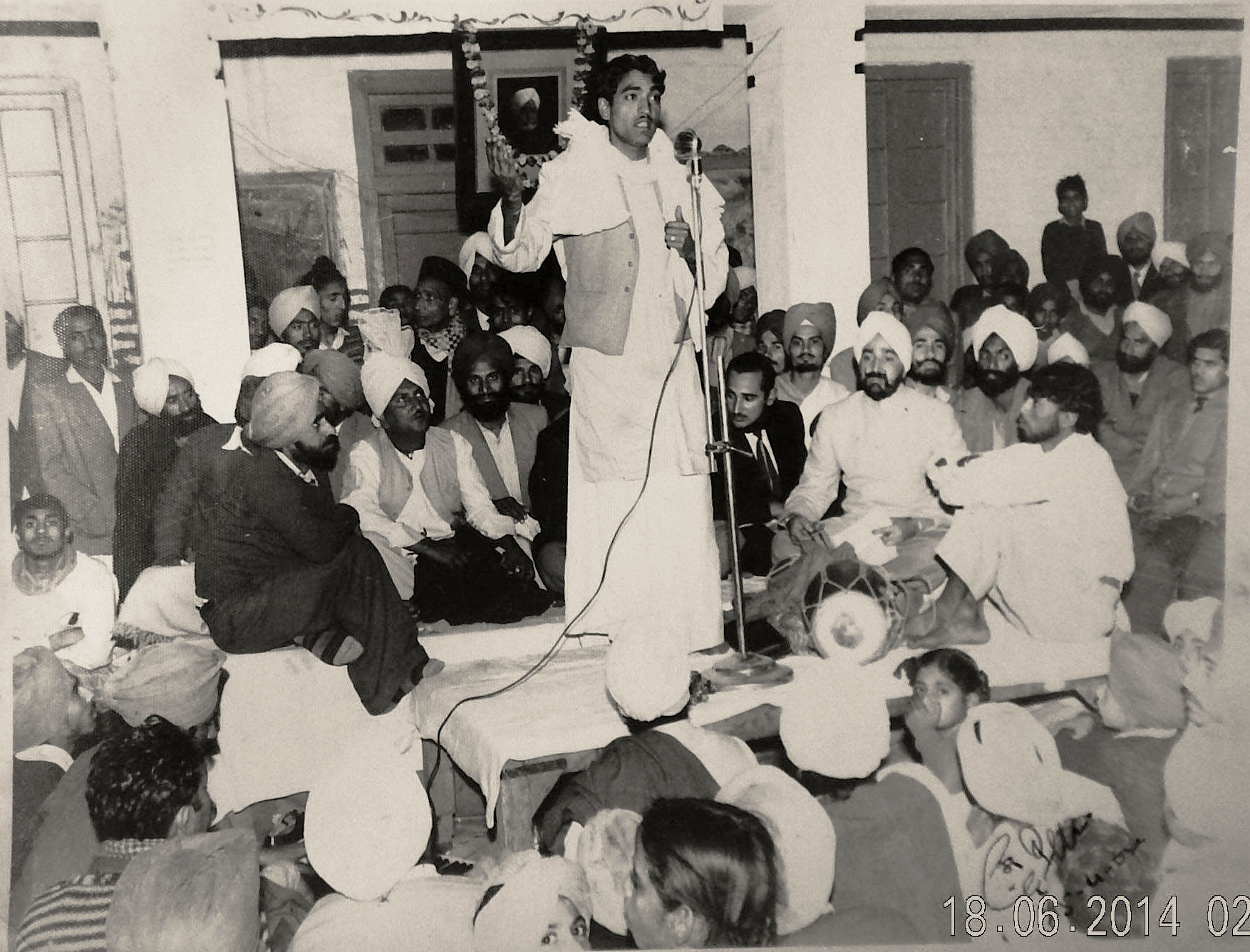
Shiv Kumar Batalvi reciting poetry, near Ludhiana. April 1962

Later in life, his father got a job as patwari at Qadian, it was during this period, that he produced some of his best work. His first anthology of poems was published in 1960, titled Piran da Paraga ("A handful of pain"), which became an instant success. Some senior writers of Batlavi, including Jaswant Singh Rahi, Kartar Singh Balgan and Barkat Ram Yumman, as the saying goes, took him under their wings. He became the youngest recipient of the Sahitya Akademi Award in 1967, for his magnum opus, the verse play Loona (1965). His poetry recitations, and singing his own verse, made him and his work even more popular amongst the masses.

Soon after his marriage, in 1968, he shifted to Chandigarh, where he joined the State Bank of India, as a professional. In the following years, bad health plagued him, though he continued to write prolifically.

=== Trip to England ===
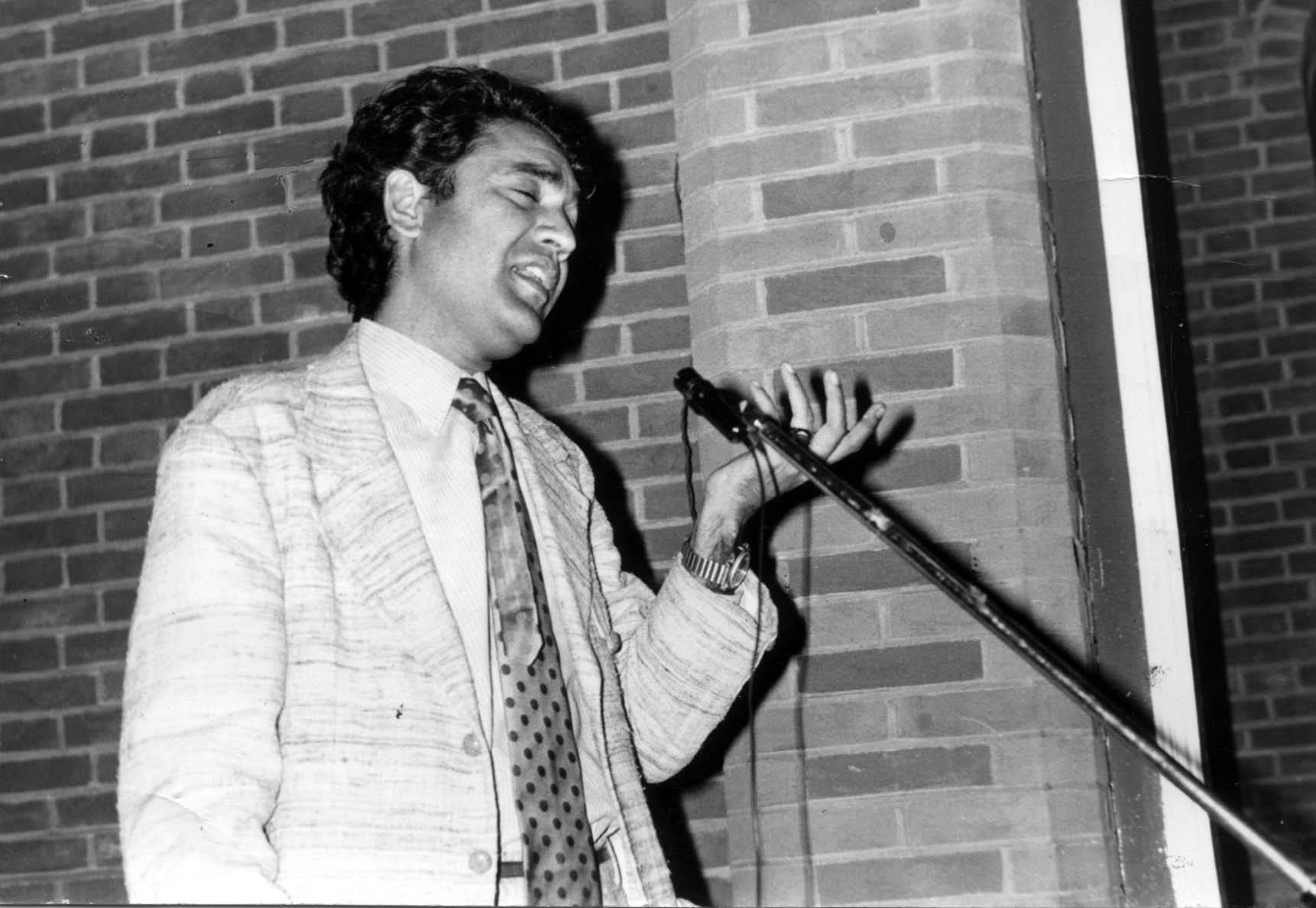
Shiv Kumar in Southall, 1971

In May 1972, Batalvi visited England, his popularity and fame had already reached a high point among the Punjabi community. His arrival was announced in the local Indian papers with headlines and pictures. He spent a busy time in England. A number of public functions and private parties were arranged in his honour where he recited his poetry. Gupal Puri arranged the first large function in Coventry, near London, to welcome him. A large number of his fans and Punjabi poets, including Santokh Singh Dhir, Kuldip Takhar and Tarsem Purewal and many others attended this function. Another large gathering was organised at Rochester, Kent in his honour. The famous artist Sobha Singh was also present. His engagements in England were regularly reported in the local Indian media and BBC Television also interviewed him. While the Punjabi community got the opportunity to listen to him on various occasions, his stay in London proved to be the last straw for his failing health. He would stay late and continue to drink until 2:00 or 2:30 in the morning at parties or at home engaged in discussions with his hosts and other people who would come to visit him. He would wake up after a short sleep around 4:00 A.M. and begin his day by again taking a couple of sips of Scotch.

=== Death ===
When Shiv returned from England in September 1972, his health had declined visibly. He was now bitterly complaining about the undue criticism of his poetry by progressive writers. He openly started talking about his disappointment at the unjustified condemnation of his poetry. Within a couple of months after his return from England, his health started sinking, never to recover again. He had developed liver cirrhosis. He was in a dire financial predicament during those days and felt that most of his friends had deserted him in his time of need. His wife Aruna, somehow managed to get him admitted to a hospital in Sector 16 of Chandigarh where he received treatment for a few days. A couple of months later, he was admitted to a hospital in Amritsar but left it on his own against the advice of his doctors. He didn't want to die in a hospital and simply walked out of the hospital and went to his family home in Batala.

His health issues put the family in a financial crisis. This was possibly the reason Shiv Kumar Batalvi along with his wife Aruna Batalvi moved to Aruna's maternal village Kiri Mangial, where he died during the early morning hours of 6 May 1973.

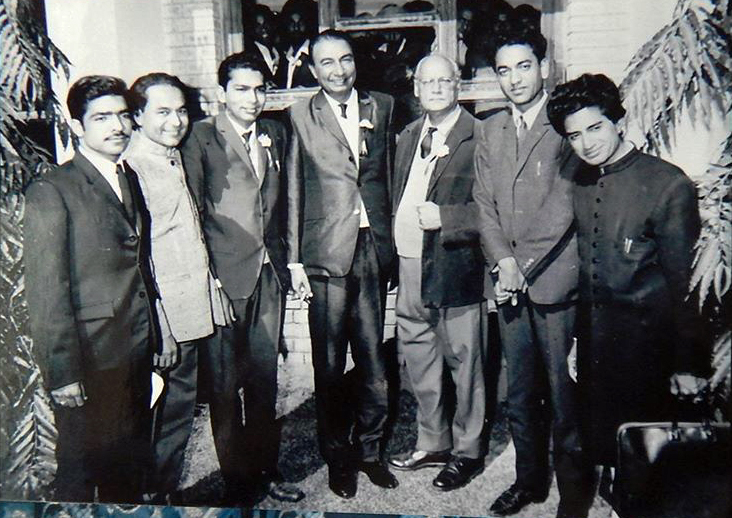
Batalvi with M. S. Randhawa, and poets from Punjab including Sahir Ludhianvi, Ludhiana, 1970

=== Personal life ===
He met a girl named Maina at a fair in Baijnath. When he went back to look for her in her hometown, he heard the news of her death and wrote his elegy "Maina". This episode was to prefigure numerous other partings that would serve as material to distil into poems. Perhaps the most celebrated such episode is his fascination for Gurbaksh Singh Preetlari's daughter who left for Venezuela and married someone else. When he heard of the birth of her first child, Shiv wrote 'Main ik shikra yaar banaya', perhaps his most famous love poem. It's said that when she had her second child, someone asked Shiv whether he would write another poem. Shiv replied "Have I become responsible for her? Am I to write a poem on her every time she gives birth to a child?"

His poem on this topic, "Main ikk shikra yaar banaya", has been translated into English.

On 5 February 1967, he married, Aruna, She was from Kiri Mangyal, Gurdaspur district, and later the couple had two children, Meharban (born 1968) and Puja (born 1969).

== Legacy ==
One of his anthologies, Alvida ("Farewell") was published posthumously in 1974, by the Guru Nanak Dev University, Amritsar.

The Shiv Kumar Batalvi Award for Best Writer, is given each year in his honour.

The Shiv Kumar Batalvi Auditorium was constructed in Batala in 2011 to commemorate his 75th birth anniversary. It is situated at Jalandhar Road, Batala.

== Publications ==
- Piran da Paraga ("The Scarful of Sorrows") (1960)
- Lajwanti (1961)
- Aate Diyan Chiriyaan (1962)
- Mainu Vida Karo ("Bid Me Farewell") (1963)
- Dardmandan Diyan Aahin (1964)
- Birha Tu Sultan (1964)
- Loona (1965)
- Main Te Main (I and Me) (1970)
- Aarti ("Prayer") (1971)
- Samuchi Kavita

== In the media ==
Jagjit Singh-Chitra Singh, Nusrat Fateh Ali Khan, Surinder Kaur, Hans Raj Hans and Ghulam Ali have sung many of his poems. Nusrat Fateh Ali Khan's rendition of one of his poems "Maye Ni Maye" is known for its soulfulness and imagery.

Babbu Maan performed Batalvi's poem "Shabab" in his album Ohi Chan Ohi Ratan (2004). Rabbi Shergill's debut album Rabbi (2004) features his poem "Ishtihar". Hans Raj Hans' popular album Gham is based on Batalvi's poetry. In 2005, a compilation album was released, titled after his poem "Ikk Kudi Jihda Naam Mohabbat Ghum Hai", with numbers sung by Mahendra Kapoor, Jagjit Singh and Asa Singh Mastana. In 2014, the rap duo Swet Shop Boys, consisting of Himanshu Suri and Riz Ahmed, released a song entitled "Batalvi" which sampled Batalvi's own recitation of "Ikk Kudi Jihda Naam Mohabbat Ghum Hai" from an interview done with Aikam TV in the early 1970s. The song's lyrics explore issues regarding cultural identity faced by many second-generation South Asians living in the West. In 2016, Punjabi rapper Kay Kap's album "Kaagaz" featured a song entitled Pind Bewafaayiyaan, which was inspired and conceptualized from the same poem. The song's lyrics concluded from the lost girl named 'Mohabbat (Love)' belonging to the village named 'Bewafaayiyaan (Betrayal)' thus, giving birth to a new theory based on Batalvi's poem with a different set of consequences.

In 2004, a Punjabi play titled Dardaan Da Darya based on Shiv's life was performed at Punjab Kala Bhavan, Chandigarh.

Several of his poems have been adapted for films, e.g. "Ajj Din Chhadeya Tere Rang Varga", was adapted in 2009 for the Hindi film Love Aaj Kal and became an instant hit. His poem "Ikk Kudi Jihda Naam Mohabbat Ghum Hai" was made into a song for the 2016 film Udta Punjab. Featuring Alia Bhatt, it was sung by Shahid Mallya and later covered by Diljit Dosanjh.

Jasleen Royal's 2012 album Panchee Ho Javan is based on Batalvi's poem of the same name, the album also contains another song "Maye Ni" based on the poem "Maye Ni Maye". Also in 2014, Pakistani pop singer Sarmad Qadeer scored a hit single on the official Asian Download chart in the UK with his interpretation of "Maye Ni Maye".

In 2020, Punjabi singer Wazir Patar made his debut with a tribute to Batalvi by producing Batalvi's only available vocal recording, "Ki Pushde O Haal Fakiran Da." He later continued to reference him in several of his other songs.

In 2022, his poem "Thabba Ku Zulfa Waleya" was made into a song, sung and with additional lyrics by Arjan Dhillon. In 2025, his poem "Jindey" was also made into a song, sung by Dhillon. In August 2025, Dhillon released his album "Shikhar" which included songs based on poems of several famous Punjabi poets. The first song on the album was "Tu Vida Hoya" written by Batalvi.
