= Mausoleum of Mai Safoora Qadiriyya =

Tomb of Hazrat Mai Safoora Qadiriyya
- حضرت مائی صفورہ قادریہ مزار
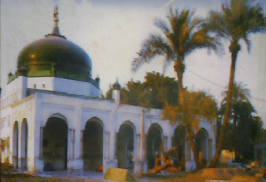
- Outer view
- Interactive map of the Tomb of Hazrat Mai Safoora Qadiriyya area

General information
- Type: Mausoleum
- Architectural style: Qadiri architecture
- Location: Basti Mai Safoora, Pirmahal Tehsil, Toba Tek Singh District; Punjab, Pakistan
- Coordinates: 30°35′19.3″N 72°12′44.3″E

The Darbar-e-Hazrat Mai Safoora Qadiriyya is located in Toba Tek Singh District, Punjab, Pakistan and was constructed in 1795 by the order of Multan's Afghan ruler Muzafar Khan.

== See also ==
- Saleh Muhammad Safoori
