= Quran translations into Punjabi =

1911 translation of the Quran

Quran in Gurmukhi script
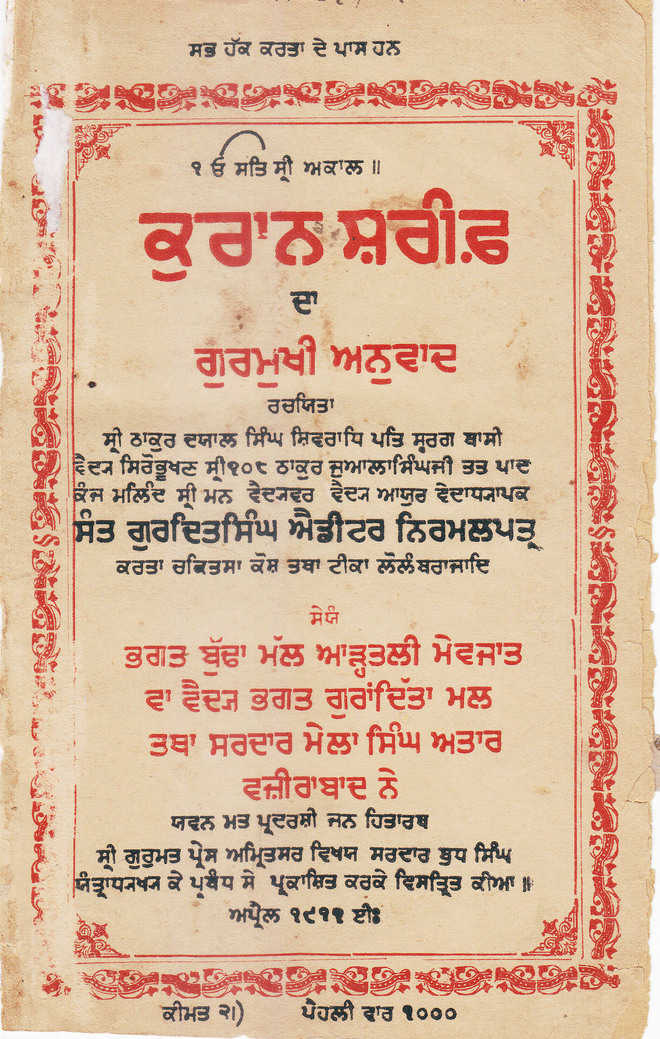
- Title-page of 'Quran Sharif', a Punjabi (in Gurmukhi) translation of the Quran, Shri Gurmat Press, Amritsar, April 1911
- Original title: ਕੁਰਾਨ ਸ਼ਰੀਫ਼
- Translator: Sant Vaidya Gurdit Singh Alomhari
- Language: Punjabi
- Genre: Religious scripture
- Publication date: 1911
- Publication place: Punjab, India
- Media type: Hardbound book
- Pages: 784

A Punjabi-language Quran, written with the Gurmukhi script, was found in the village of Lande, in the Moga district of Punjab State. It is believed to be the oldest Quran in the Gurmukhi script, published in 1911. The quran was published through the efforts of Hindu and Sikh funders and a Sikh translator.

== History ==
The Quran was translated/transliterated from Arabic by a Sikh scholar, Sant Vaidya Gurdit Singh Alomhari of the Nirmala tradition, with money and other arrangements for its publication made by two Hindu businessmen, Bhagat Buddhamal Aadatli and Vaidya Bhaga, and a Sikh, Sardar Mela Singh Arif. It was first published by a Sikh publisher named Sardar Buddh Singh at Shri Gurmat Press, Amritsar in 1911, with a print run of 1,000, and each copy sold for Rs 2.25.

The particular copy found in Moga by Subhash Parihar is in the possession of Noor Mohammad. It was formerly in the possession of Jhanda Singh Aarif, a local poet of Kotkapura. After Jhanda Singh Aarif's death, the ownership of the Quran was given to Noor Mohammad by Aarif's eldest son, Natha Singh. Prior to its discovery, it was previously believed that the earliest Gurmukhi version of the Quran has been the one produced by the Ahmadiyya sect in the 1980's. Punjabi University, Patiala planned to digitize the work.

== Bibliography ==
- Khan, Mofakhkhar Hussain (2001). The Holy Qur'ãn in South Asia: A Bio-bibliographic Study of Translations of the Holy Qurʼãn in 23 South Asian Languages. Bibi Akhtar Prakãs̆ani. pp. 175–81.
