= Saleh Muhammad Safoori =

Punjabi Sufi poet

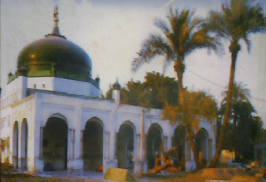
- The mausoleum of Saleh Muhammad Safoori
- Born: 1747; Sidhnai Ravi belt, Punjab, Mughal Empire (present-day Toba Tek Singh District, Punjab, Pakistan)
- Died: 1826 (aged 78–79)
- Era: 18th century
- Known for: Punjabi poetry
- Parent: Safoora (Mother)

Saleh Muhammad Safoori (Punjabi: صالح محمد صفوری) was an 18th-century Punjabi Muslim Sufi poet.

== Background ==
Saleh Safoori was a son of Noor Muhammad and Mai Safoora, a local Muslim saint. His Punjabi works were published in 2011 under the title Kulliyat-e-Saleh Muhammad Safoori, which included the stories of Sassi Punnu and Sohni Mahinwal, two poetic tributes to Sufi Sultan Abdul Hakeem and Jati Abdal as well as one in the memory of his mother Mai Safoora and two Si-Harfis (a form of Punjabi poetry).

== See also ==
- Mausoleum of Hazrat Mai Safoora Qadiriyya
