= Sialkot Fort =

Ruined fort in Punjab, Pakistan

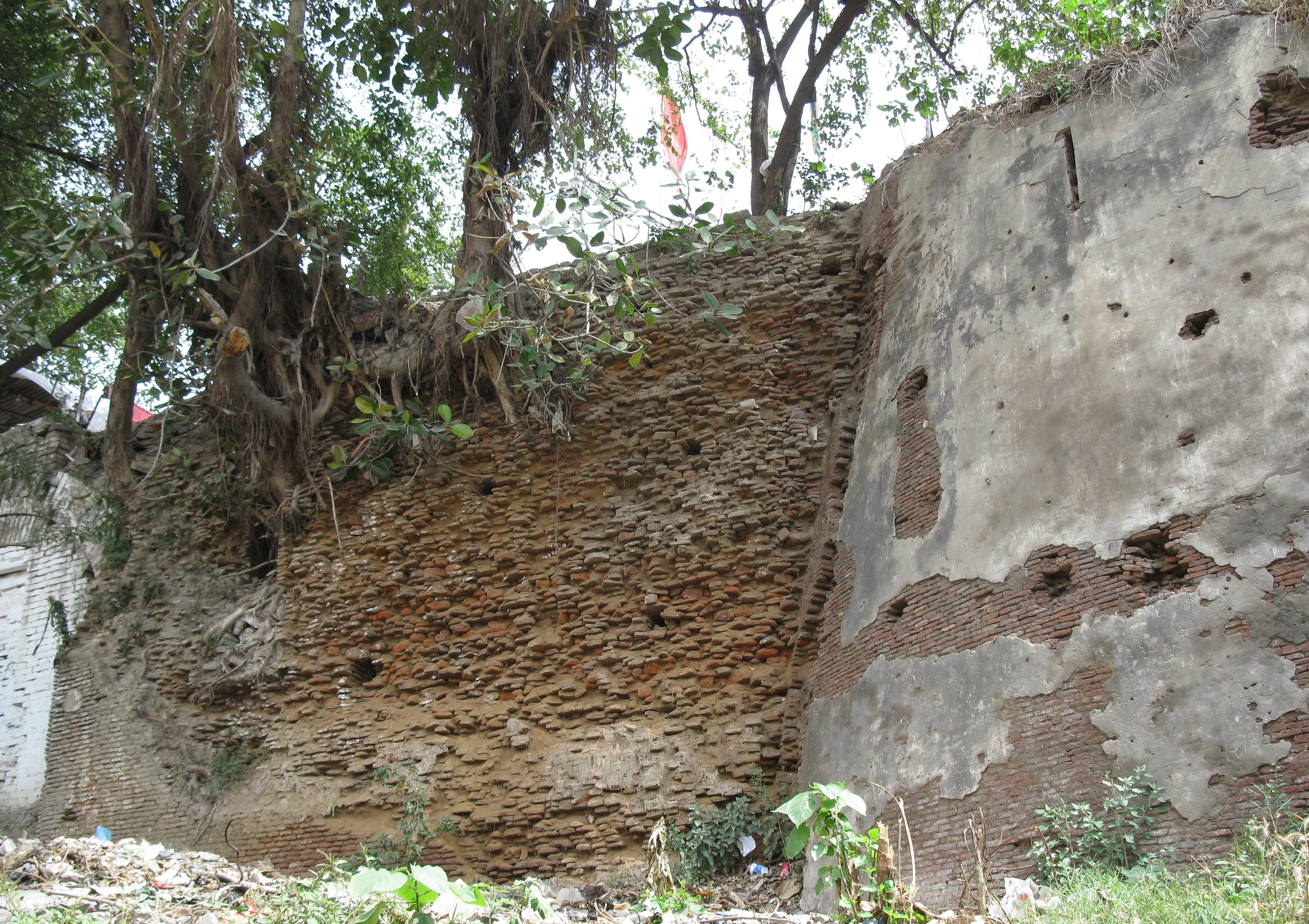
- Ruins of the Sialkot Fort.
- Interactive map of Sialkot Fort
- Location: Sialkot district, Punjab, Pakistan
- Coordinates: 32.4939°N 74.5419°E
- Built: Around 2nd century CE

Sialkot Fort is an ancient fort in ruins in the Sialkot district of Pakistan. According to Punjabi folklore, it was built by Raja Sálbán around the 2nd century CE.

The fort was rebuilt by Shahab ud-Din Ghori after its capture from Khusrau Malik, the last Ghaznavid ruler.

The Sialkot Fort was given to the Janjua tribes by Sultan Firuz Shah Tughluq who accepted their suzerainty in that region around late 14th century CE.

During the Akbar era, Sialkot's pargana territory was placed in the jagir custodianship of Raja Man Singh, who would repair the city's fort, and sought to increase its population and develop its economy.

During the reign of Jahangir, the post was given to Safdar Khan, who rebuilt the city's fort, and oversaw a further increase in Sialkot's prosperity.

== See also ==
- Sialkot
