= Loona (Punjabi epic) =

Epic verse play by Shiv Kumar Batalvi

Loona (Lūṇā, Punjabi: ਲੂਣਾ) is a Punjabi epic verse play by Shiv Kumar Batalvi, based on the ancient legend of Puran Bhagat. In 1967 the author became the youngest recipient of the Sahitya Akademi Award by Sahitya Akademi (India's National Academy of Letters). .

Though Loona is portrayed as a villain in the legend, Shiv created the epic around her agony which caused her to become a villain.

== Plot ==
The original epic is based on the ancient legend of saint Puran Bhagat (Bhagat is the Punjabi word for a saint, devotee). Puran is a prince whose father marries a girl named Loona, much younger than him, the stepmother of Puran, is attracted to Puran and conveys her feelings to him. Puran, a pious devotee of God, having no desirs to sensual pleasures or the intent to betray his father, refuses her advances. Loona is badly hurt by this and seeks revenge by convincing her husband to exile Puran.

In the original legend, Loona is the vengeful villain of the story and Puran is the righteous hero and also the victim. Shiv adopted a contrary viewpoint, creating the epic around the pain and tragedy of Loona, a teenage girl belonging to a lower chamar caste, conflicted by her marginalized past, married off to a man much older than her against her will, and renounced by the man she loves, Puran. Shiv paints a more humane, subtle, and reasonable point of view, depicting how society often treats and shapes individuals, especially women, who are deprived of their very will to choose and to love. The outlook of this may result in that individual resorting to condemnable actions. This narrative challenges the older simplistic and arguably misogynistic folktale which is centered around Puran.

== Importance in Punjabi Literature ==
The epic is considered a masterpiece in modern Punjabi literature, and which also created a new genre of modern Punjabi kissa. Amongst enthusiasts of modern Punjabi poetry, Shiv's poetry is considered equal to that of Mohan Singh (poet) and Amrita Pritam, who are popular on both sides of Indo-Pakistan border.

== Awards ==
- Sahitya Akademi Award in 1967
