= Gandghar =

Gandghar (Urdu: گندگھر; Pashto: ګند غر) is a mountain range located on the western edge of Hazara Division, in the Khyber Pakhtunkhwa province of Pakistan. It is situated east of the Indus River (i.e on the left bank) in Haripur District. The Gandghar hill is a natural barrier restraining water of the Tarbela Dam from spilling away.

The city of Haripur is situated at the front of these mountains; it borders Tarbela Dam to the Northeast and the Hasan Abdal to the South. Peethan is considered highest top of this range.

Gandghar hill is home to a large number of villages including Sirikot, Nara, Kihari, Garhan, Darra Mohatt, Chountrai, Galai, Salam Khand, Dhok, Tarchitti, Baddah, Kharyan, Phulai Patti, Rakar, Chechian, Khyter, Ross, Bhal Dheri, Jhamra, Garr, Jabbar, Moriyaan and Dralla.

The tahirkhelis and said khani (sub branches of utmanzai tribe) along side with other utmanzi branches and other pakthoon tribes form the majority of the population, other tribes include Mushwani, Mughal, Qureshi, Gujjar and some Pakhtoon tribes. The main language across this mountain range is Pashto, while Hindko and Urdu are also spoken and understood.

Gandhar is famous for the tales of Raja Rasalu. Some of these tales are also reported by British Army officer Major Abbott (famous for Abbottabad) who reported that he has listened such stories from the locals during his stay in the area of village Nara as his earlier headquarter in the first thirty years of the 20th century. Famous book Tuzke Jahngiri, travelogues of Mughal emperor Jahngir, also mentions some of these tales associated with the Gandghar mountains.

One such tale is that Raja Risalu used to stay during hunting expeditions in one of the caves of Sirban Mountain in Abbottabad. One day the Raja was informed by his parrot that his wife is in secret relation with another Demon (Dev) and they secretly meet in Gandghar mountains. Upon this Raja Rasalu rushed to the mountains where he found his wife and the Demon together. The Demon, afraid of the Raja's wrath, ran away from the occasion and found refuge in one of the caves of the Gandghar. The Raja chased the Demon and closed the opening of the cave with a huge rock. Folk stories tell us that the Demon jailed inside these mountains cries once in a year or two and the entire mountain range echoes with his cries.
