= Raja Sálbán =

Legendary monarch

Raja Sálbán (also known as Salivahan) (Note: Alternatively spelt as 'Raja Sálwan'.) was a legendary monarch who is said to have lived in the first century CE, to have founded the city of Sialkot and the Sialkot Fort, and to have also conquered territory in Multan and Sindh. According to Punjabi folklore, he was the father of Puran Bhagat and Raja Rasalu.

== Story ==
Raja Salban's first wife, Queen Icchira gave birth to Puran Bhagat. Upon the suggestion of local astrologers, Puran was sent away from the King for the first 12 years of his life, as it was said that King could not see the face of his son. While Puran was away, the king married a young girl named Luna, who a tanner's daughter. After 12 years of isolation, Puran returned to the royal palace. There, Luna became romantically attracted toward Puran, who was of the same age. Being the step-son of Luna, Puran disapproved of her advances. A hurt Luna accused Puran of violating her honor.

The infuriated monarch ordered Puran to be amputated and killed. The soldiers carried out his orders and cutoff the Puran's hands and legs and threw him in a well in the forest named the Puran's Well. After several years Guru Gorakhnath, who was passing by with his followers, heard voice from the well. He took him out using a single thread and unbaked earthen pot. He was later adopted by Baba Gorakhnath, and himself became a jogi.

Eventually, he confronted his father, and it was due to the ascetic's blessings that the king had another son from Queen Loona who eventually became Raja Rasalu, another folk legend that became popular in Punjab.

== Claims of descent ==
Various historical figures have claimed descent from Salban. Rao Bhati, the common ancestor of the Bhati Rajputs claimed descent from Salban and so did Bhati's descendant, Jaisal Singh, the founder and first monarch of Jaisalmer. Other claims of descent from Salban, via Jaisal Singh's lineage, include the Punjabi Phulkian dynasty.

== See also ==
- Punjabi folklore
- Puran's Well
