= Ajaib Kamal =

Punjabi poet and playwright

Ajaib Kamal (Note: Punjabi: اجیب کمال) (1933-2011) was a writer of the Punjabi language. Born in the Hoshiarpur District of the Punjab, he later moved to Kenya. As a poet and playwright, his work is considered part of the modernist tradition in Punjabi literature. Beginning as a writer of ghazals, he later shifted to other verse forms and is considered a specialist of the long verse form in Punjabi. He has also written several dramas in Punjabi including Chaanak Anne Han, Hatheli Te Ugya Shehr, Dahri Wala Ghora, and Langra Aasmaan.
