= Akhara Bāḍhā Sa'ala Jagu =

Apabhraṃśa poem

Akhara Bāḍhā Sa'ala Jagu is an Apabhramsa poem attributed to Saraha, a Vajrayana Mahasiddha saint. The poem is dated to around 760 CE and its language has close affinities to Punjabi, which developed later. The poem is a doha couplet.

== Text ==
The text of the poem is as follows:

Original (Apabhramsa)
Summarized translation (English)

Couplet one:
ਜਾਣ ਣ ਆਪ ਜਣਿੱਜਣਿ, ਤਾਵ ਣ ਸਿੱਸ ਕਰੇਇ।
Jāṇa ṇa āpa jaṇijaṇi, tāva ṇa sisa karē'i
ਅੰਧਾ ਅੰਧ ਕਾਢਵ ਤਿਮ, ਵੇਣ ਵਿ ਕੂਵ ਪੜੇਇ॥
Adhā adha kāḍhava tima, vēṇa vi kūva paṛē'i.
ਅਰਥਃ ਜਦ ਤੱਕ ਆਪ ਜਾਣੂ ਨਾ ਹੋਵੋ ਤਦ ਤੱਕ ਕਿਸੇ ਨੂੰ ਸਿੱਸ ਨਾ ਬਣਾਵੋ। ਜੇ ਅੰਨ੍ਹਾ ਅੰਨ੍ਹੇ ਨੂੰ ਖੂਹ ਚੋਂ ਕੱਢੇ ਤਾਂ ਦੋਵੇਂ ਡੁਬਦੇ ਹਨ॥
Arathaਃ jada taka āpa jāṇū nā hōvō tada taka kisē nū sisa nā baṇāvō. Jē anhā anhē nū khūha cōṁ kaḍhē tāṁ dōvēṁ ḍubadē hana.

Couplet two:
ਅੱਖਰ ਬਾਢਾ ਸਅਲ ਜਗੁ, ਣਾਹਿ ਣਿਰੱਖਰ ਕੋਇ।
Akhara bāḍhā sa'ala jagu, ṇāhi ṇirakhara kō'i.
ਤਾਵ ਸੇ ਅੱਖਰ ਘੋਲਿਆ, ਜਾਵ ਣਿਰੱਖਰ ਹੋਇ॥
Tāva sē akhara ghōli'ā, jāva ṇirakhara hō'i
ਅਰਥਃ ਸਾਰਾ ਜਗਤ ਅੱਖਰਾਂ ਨੇ ਬੰਨਿਆਂ ਹੋਇਆ ਹੈ, ਨਿਰੱਖਰ ਕੋਈ ਨਹੀਂ। ਐਸੇ ਅੱਖਰ ਸਿਰਜੋ ਜਿਸ ਰਾਹੀਂ ਨਿਰੱਖਰ “ਅਲੇਖ” ਹੋ ਸਕੀਏ॥
Arathaਃ sārā jagata akharāṁ nē bani'āṁ hō'i'ā hai, nirakhara kō'ī nahīṁ. Aisē akhara sirajō jisa rāhīṁ nirakhara “alēkha” hō sakī'ē.

Couplet one:
One should not make someone a student until he is aware. If the blind tries to pull the blind out of the well, both of them drown.

Couplet two:
The whole world is bound by letters and there is no single one. Learn such alphabets through which we can write well.

—Akhara bāḍhā sa'ala jagu (760) by Saraha

== See also ==
- Punjabi literature
- Taank Kingdom
