= Sohinder Singh Wanjara Bedi =

Punjabi folklorist

Sohinder Singh Wanjara Bedi (1924-2001) was a Punjabi folklorist and a British Indian born in Sialkot, a city now part of Pakistan.

== Personal life ==
Wanjara Bedi was born in Sialkot, now in Pakistan. He did his M.A. in Punjabi from the Punjabi University and PhD from the University of Delhi. He worked as a senior lecturer at Dayal Singh College, Delhi. Dr Bedi has written some eighty books, which include three collections of poems, five books on literary criticism, and some books on Punjab folklore. He has been a proud recipient of some fifteen prestigious literary awards, including the Sahitya Kala Parishad Award. He has been a member of some literary and cultural associations. Bedi's autobiography Galley Chikar Duri Ghar, the book chosen for the award, not only records the autobiographical details of the author's life but also explores new dimensions of a person's total view of life. For the maturity of thought and sincerity of expression, the book is considered to be a great contribution to Punjabi literature.

== Books ==
- Addhī miṭṭī, addhā sonā
- Bātāṃ muḍḍha kadīma dīāṃ
- Folk tales of India
- Folklore of the Punjab
- Galiey chikkad doori ghari
- Galīe cikaṛu dūri gharu
- Gurū Arajana Dewa Jī dī bāṇī wica loka-tatta
- Gurū Nānaka te loka-prawāha ("Guru Nanak and folklore")
- Ika ghuṭa rasa dā
- Loka ākhade hana
- Virse di phulkari
- Panjabi lokdhara vishav kosh. Vol. 5: 'Kalh' ton 'ghorewah' tak.
- Mera Nanka Pind
- Mera Dadka Pind
- Raja Rasalu

== Legacy ==
His story Sunth te Haldi became popular and since 1992 it is included in 5th class Punjabi textbook of Punjab school Education board. The story sund te Haldi has been included in the 5th class book for almost 30 years.

His other stories Sabj Pari, Neel kamal and Raja Rasalu are included in 12th class Punjabi textbook of Punjab school Education board.

== Awards ==
Bedi won the Sahitya Akademi Award in 1988 for his book Galiey Chikar Duri Ghar.
