= Chaupar =

Board game played in India

Chaupar (IAST: caupaṛ), chopad or chaupad or pagade (Kannada: ಪಗಡೆ) is a cross and circle board game very similar to pachisi, played in India. The board is made of wool or cloth, with wooden pawns and seven cowry shells to be used to determine each player's move, although others distinguish chaupur from pachisi by the use of three four-sided long dice. Variations are played throughout India. It is similar in some ways to Pachisi, Parcheesi and Ludo.

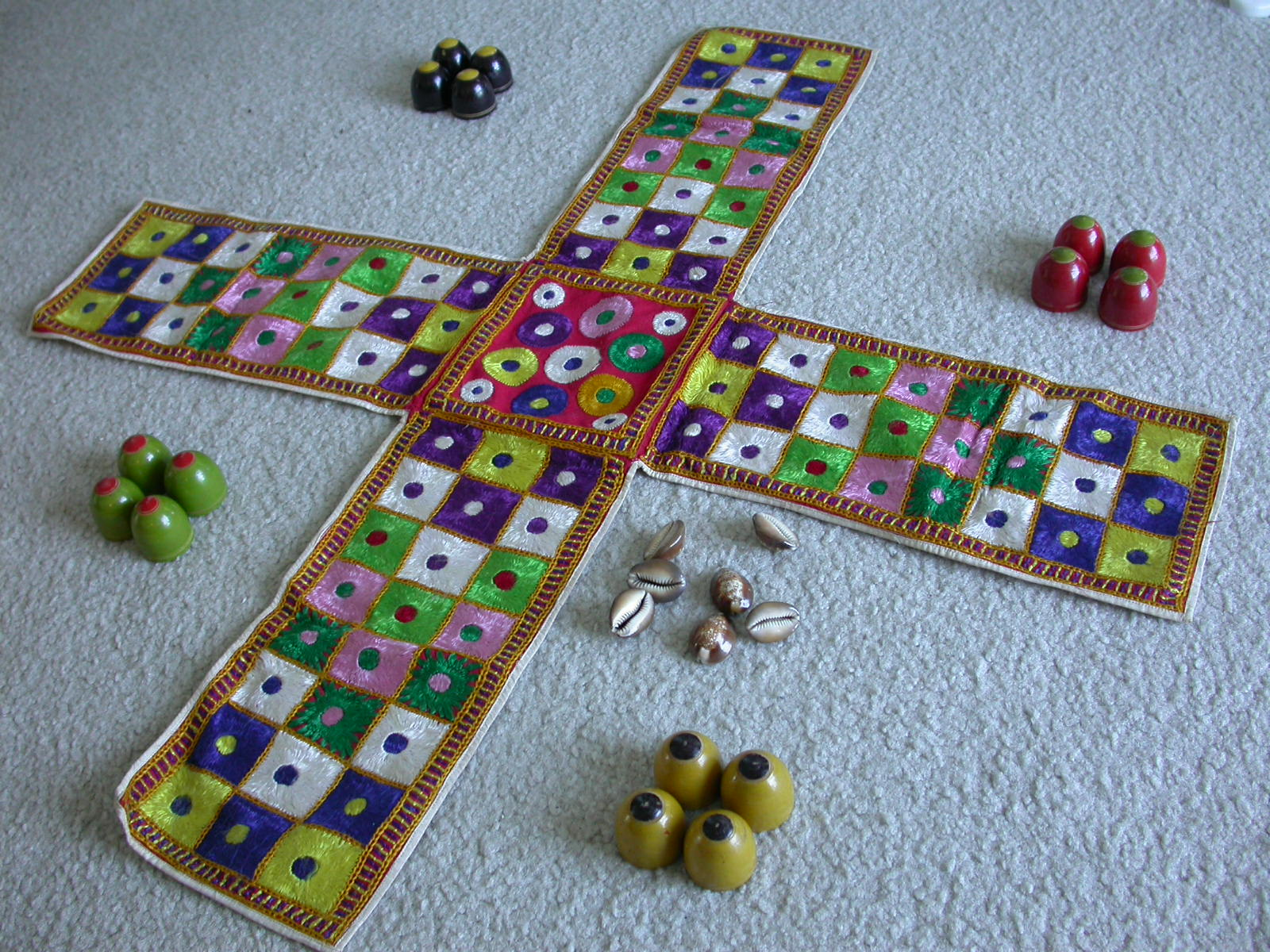
Fabric chausar board

== History ==
Games similar to chaupar with difference in colour schemes along with dice have been identified from Iron Age, Painted grey ware period from Mathura. Pachisi originated from chaupar.

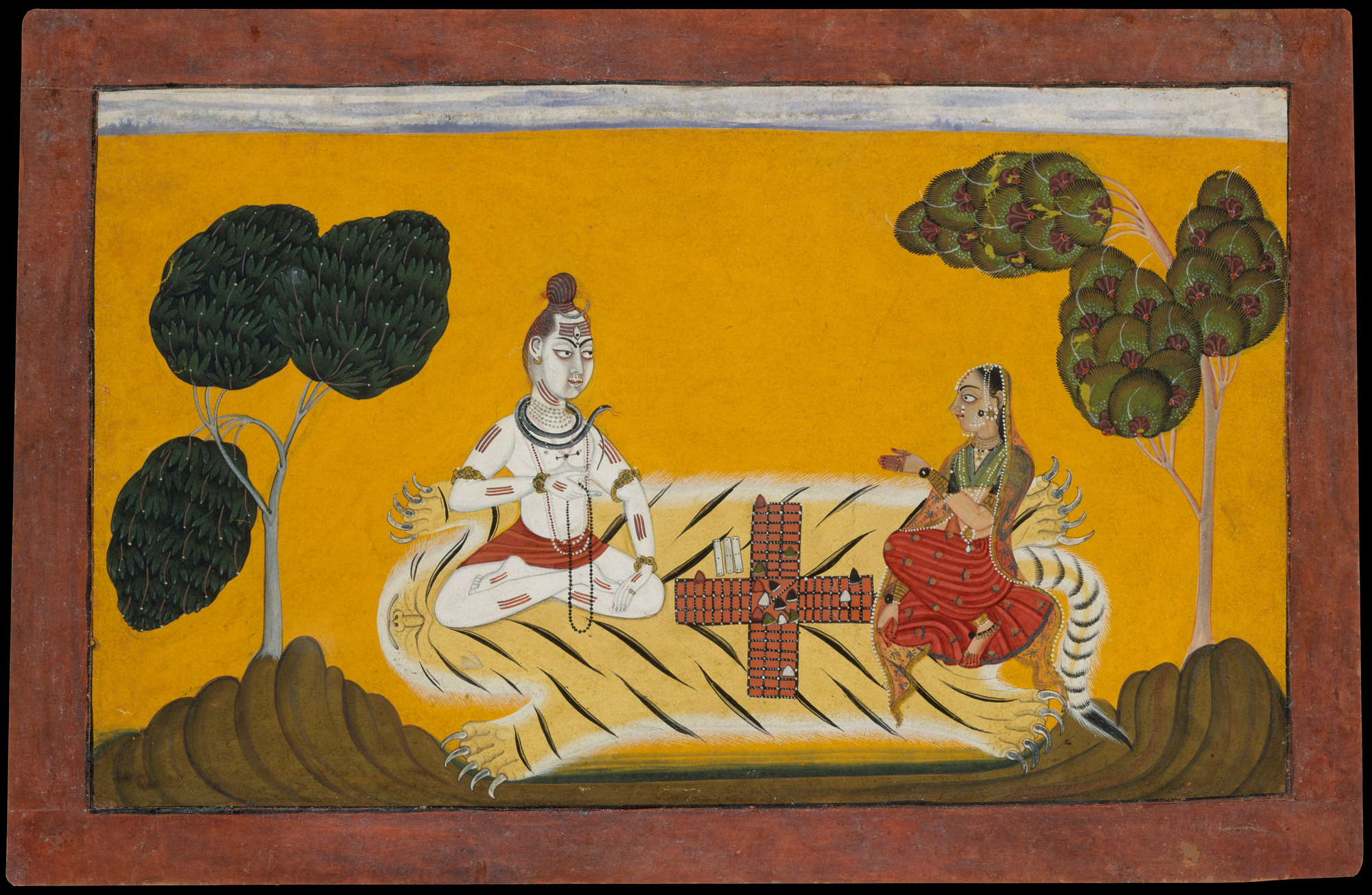
Hindu deities Shiva and Parvati playing chaupar, c. 1694–95

Chopat is claimed to be a variation of the game of dice played in the epic poem Mahabharata between Yudhishthira and Duryodhan.

=== Legends ===
Raja Rasalu plays chaupar with Raja Sirkap, illustration by John D. Batten, 1892

There are famous stories passed on from generation to generation about kings who played this magnificent game. One particular tale tells of a King who had 2 trained mice called "Sundari and Mundari". This king would distract his opponent with details, stories and tales. He would then casually utter "Sundari and Mundari"; at this point the mice would come and move the pieces around without the opponent noticing. Another tale is of Raja Rasalu who plays chaupar with Raja Sirkap and wins his kingdom.

== Set up ==
A chopat 'board' is traditionally an embroidered cloth in the shape of a cross. Each arm of the cross is divided into three columns and each column is divided into eight squares. The “dice” are seven cowry shells. The “men” or pieces (Sogtha)are usually made of wood. Each player has four men, although variants exist using 8 men each.

== Playing style ==
This game is usually played in a bantering manner, and it is quite common for players to mock each other's play just before the choris are thrown, or to attempt to distract their opponent by snorting, cracking knuckles, pretending to spit or making absurd noises to "curse" or spoil the opponent's turn.

If any of the players does not have his thore (to have killed at least one pawn) by the end of the game, then that player is known to have lost with a bay-thoree, which is the most disgraceful form of losing.

== Basic rules ==
A maximum of four players play this game, each sitting in front of an arm of the cross. The centre of the cross is “ghar" or "home”.

The center column on each arm of the cross is the "home column" for each player's men after they cross the flower motif. The starting point for each player is the flower motif on the column to the left of his home column.

Each player has to enter his four men into the game from the starting point. The men travel around the outer perimeter columns in an anti-clockwise direction. Before a player can bring any of his own men “home”, he has to knock out at least one man of another player. This is called a “tohd”. Only the player's own men can enter the home column of each player. Once the men cross the flower motif, they are played by laying the pieces on their side to indicate they are in their final home stretch and are safe now from any further attack.

=== Cowry Shells ===
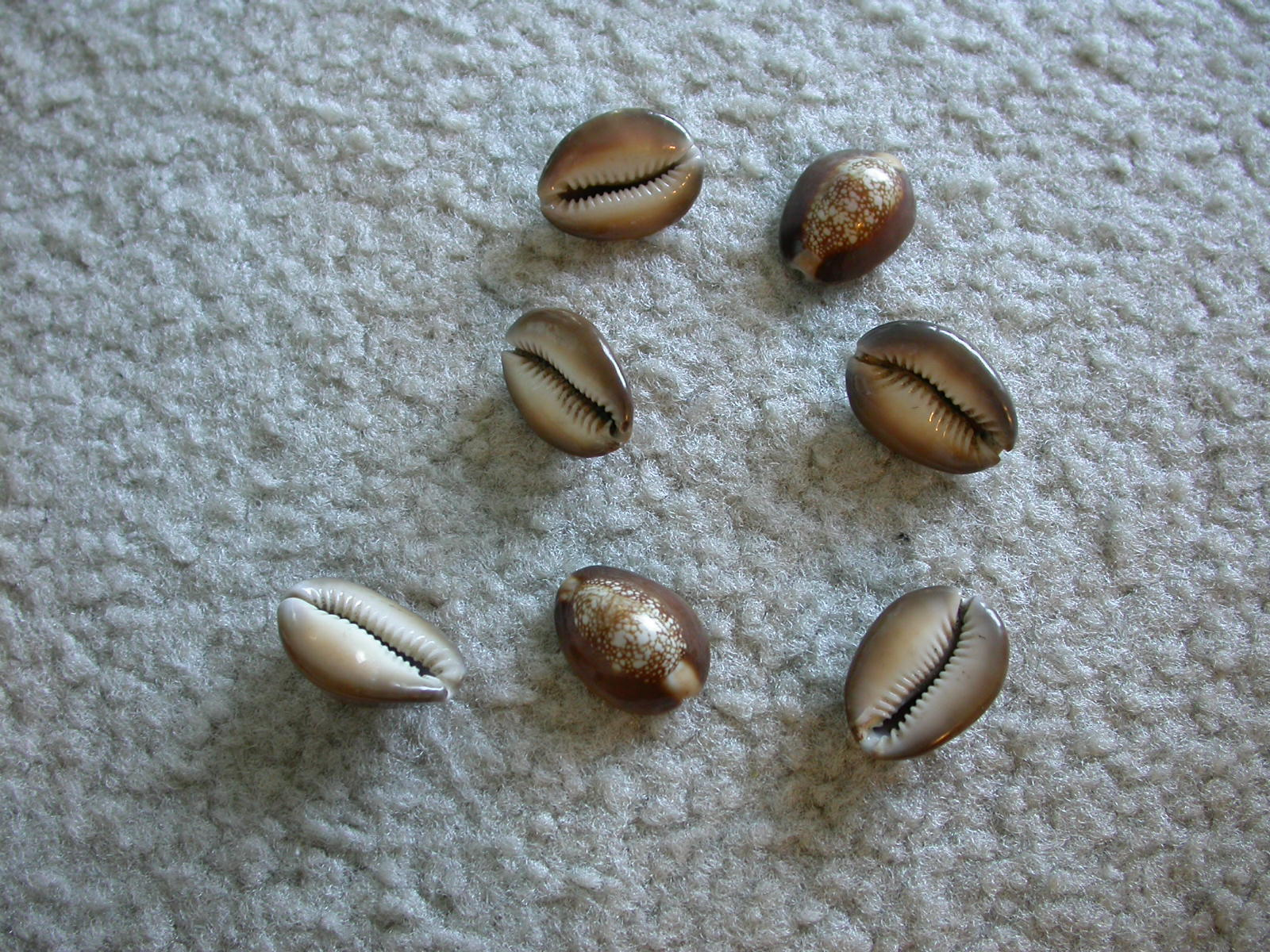
Score of 25 points

All seven cowry shells are used in each throw. In one version, scoring is as follows:

- All 7 facing down – 7 points
- 1 facing up, 6 facing down – 10 points
- 2 facing up, 5 facing down – 2 points
- 3 facing up, 4 facing down – 3 points
- 4 facing up, 3 facing down – 4 points
- 5 facing up, 2 facing down – 25 points
- 6 facing up, 1 facing down – 30 points
- All 7 facing up – 14 points

=== Entering men ===
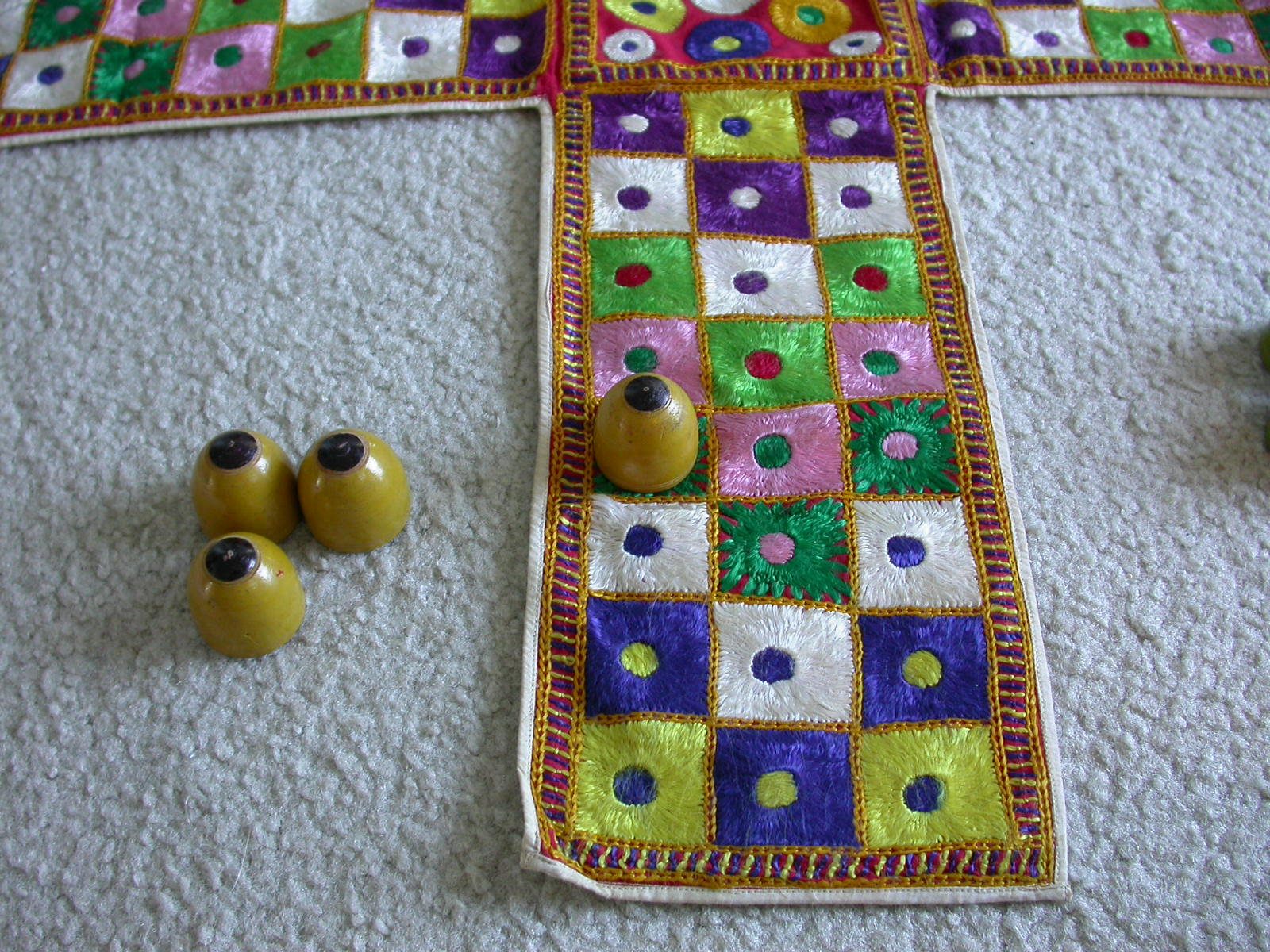
Point of Entry

To start, each player takes turns throwing the cowry shells. The player with the highest score starts first.

A player can only enter a man into the game if he has a “high” throw - 10, 25 or 30 points or higher. The starting point each player is the flower motif on the column to the left of his home column.

=== Mid-game ===
The men travel around the outer perimeter columns in an anti-clockwise direction from their starting flower motifs. For each high throw, a player gets an additional throw. If he has three consecutive high throws, they “burn” up - "beli jaye" and he loses a turn. If a player has multiple throws in a turn because of a “high” throw, he is allowed to move different men for each of the throws.

Once all four of his men have entered into play, any further throws of 10, 25 or 30 points by the player results in the granting of one additional step or point called “peghedu”. This is a bonus point. This peghedu (single step) may be used to move another man, separate from the man moved for the throw itself. At any point in the game, if a player has no men who can move the amount of a throw, that throw is forfeited.

If at any point our doublet is there and number 10 or 25 is to move then exact 10 or 25 will move with doublet not single single pawn will move 10 or 25.If at any point doublet is there and we have to move 1 extra number of 10 or 25 it will also move as doublet not single pawn.

=== Safe Squares ===
The squares with the flower motifs are “safe” squares (Cheere). Two opposing players’ men can both land on the same square with no harm to either. If two men of the same player rest on a single square, they are safe. Men of other players can move past this square on their turn although they cannot land there. There are a total of 8 safe squares.

=== Knock Out ===
Each player has to knock out at least one man of another player – do a “tohd” or "hit" - before he can bring any of his men home, Flower Motif of First strip players home arm. This is done by landing his man on any square other than one with a flower motif, occupied by a single man of his opponent. The knocked out man is taken out of play and has to be re-entered into the game the usual way.

=== Counting Strategies ===
Each arm of the cross has 17 squares for moving so:

1. "aanth ghar pacchees" - move 8 for throw of 25 - count 8 squares forward and move to the corresponding square on the next arm of the cross.
2. "tehr ghar trees" - move 13 for throw of 30 - count 13 squares forward and move to the corresponding square on the next arm of the cross.

=== Coming Home ===
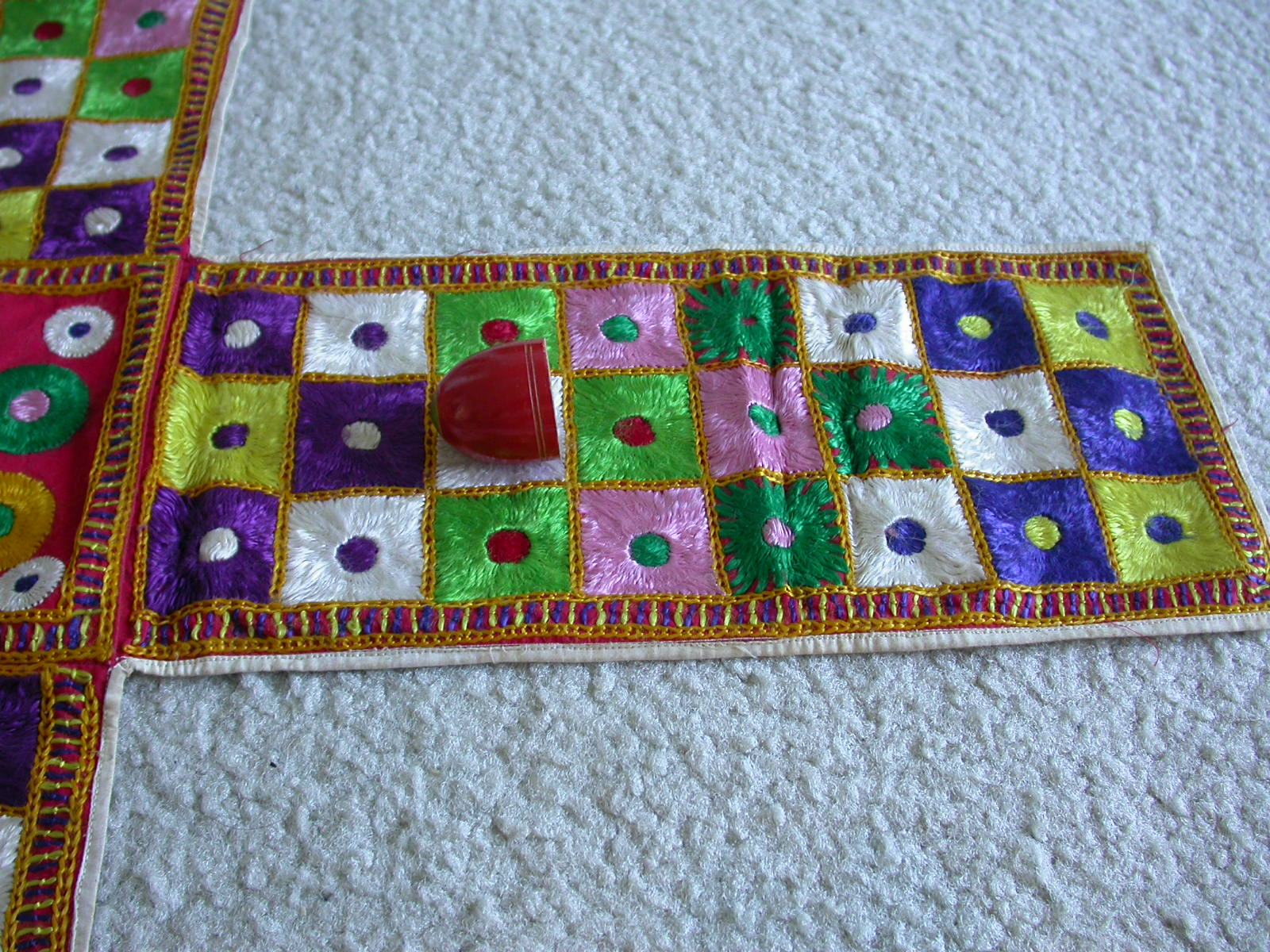
Safe in final home stretch

The home column for each player can only be entered by his men if he has already made at least one “tohd”. Once the men cross the flower motif, they are played by laying the pieces on their side to indicate they are in their final home stretch and are safe now from any further attack.

Each man enters the center cross “home” only with the exact number of steps. If the throw is higher than the required number of steps, and if it cannot be used by any other of his men still in play, that throw is forfeited.

=== Winning ===
The first player who brings all four of his men home is the winner. Play continues for second and third places until one last player has men remaining on the board.

== Playing notes ==
- Games can last anything from 30 minutes to many hours. Technically, a game can never end depending on the players. This is possible if players keep doing "Alkhee" ghaats moves.
- A player wins an extra turn if they roll the dice to 6, 12, 10 or "8" (25 square move).
- The pawns are not permitted to get out from the "Charkoni" (nest) square, but from the 10 or "8" (25 square move)
- Forfeiting the turn voluntarily is not allowed (unlike Pachisi).
- The game is either played by 2 opponents who sit opposite each other with 4 pawns each. or is played by 2 partners against another pair of 2 partners. The partners sit opposite each other. If either partner gets all his pawns up (achieves his side of objectives of the game), then that partner will miss his/her turn for 5 times and then will aid his partner thereafter. For example, if Partner A is using red pawns and Partner B is using yellow pawns. If partner B gets all his pawns up and misses 5 turns. This means that every turn that Partner A AND B play will be used to move the red pawns.
- When a pawn reaches the 'top'; that pawn can be removed by the top voluntarily by playing a 10 or an "8". This "re-awakened" (called an "Alkhee") pawn can kill other pawns who have partnered up together on the same square or pawns on a safe square and can be awakened from any of the 4 houses. It will go up to the house from which it was awakened.
- Players cannot move their pawns past the safe square outside their house (to go into their house) unless they have killed at least one pawn. To gain their "thore".
- It is not allowed to fix the cowry shells before throwing them. This is cheating and is known as "Bandhana".
- The cowri shells are usually thrown in 3 styles: either by sliding them, throwing them in the air with one cowri placed on the index finger (which is thrown higher) or by spinning them in the hand.

== Derivations ==
Games derived from the Chauper include Gyan chauper and Ludo.
