= Raja Rasalu =

Character from Punjabi folklore

Raja Rasalu is a legendary prince and protagonist of the Adventures of Raja Rasalu, a Punjabi folktale. According to the story, he was a son of Raja Sálbán, the king of Sialkot, and queen Loona, and a step-brother of Puran Bhagat.

== Sources ==
Depiction of Raja Rasalu from a Punjabi qissa

The story of Raja Salban and his two sons, Puran and Rasalu, has been popular in Punjab for several centuries. However, the earliest tales were written down in the 19th century, and display visible Islamic influences. They were first published by Charles Rev Swynnerton in his 1884 book The Adventures of the Panjáb Hero Rájá Rasálu: And Other Folk-tales of the Panjáb. A slightly different version appears in Flora Annie Steel's Tales of the Punjab: Told by the People (1894).

== Tales ==
Raja Rasalu playing game of chaupar with Raja Sirkap, illustration by John D. Batten, 1892

Tales in Raja Rasalu cycle appearing in The Adventures of the Panjáb hero Rájá Rasálu:

- Chapter I: Rasálu's early life
- Chapter II: Rasálu's first triumphs [He goes to Gujerat in Romantic Tales from the Panjâb]
- Chapter III: Rasálu's return from exile [His revolt in Romantic Tales from the Panjâb]
- Chapter IV: Rájá Rasálu and Mírshikári [The Hunter King in Romantic Tales from the Panjâb]
- Chapter V: Rájá Rasálu and the swans
- Chapter VI: Rájá Rasálu and Rájá Bhój
- Chapter VII: Rájá Rasálu and the giants of Gandgarh
- Chapter VIII: Rasálu's adventure with Tilliár, the snake, and Kág, the crow
- Chapter IX: Rájá Rasálu and Rájá Sirikap
- Chapter X: The treason of Queen Koklán
- Chapter XI: The fate of Ráni Koklán
- Chapter XII: The death of Rasálu

Tales in Raja Rasalu cycle appearing in Tales of the Punjab:

- How Raja Rasâlu was born
- How Raja Rasâlu went out into the world
- How Raja Rasâlu's friends forsook him
- How Raja Rasâlu killed the giants
- How Raja Rasâlu became a Jôgi
- How Raja Rasâlu journeyed to the city of King Sarkap
- How Raja Rasâlu swung the seventy fair maidens, daughters of the King
- How Raja Rasâlu played Chaupur with King Sarkap
