= Landhe Ke =

Village in Punjab, India

- Village
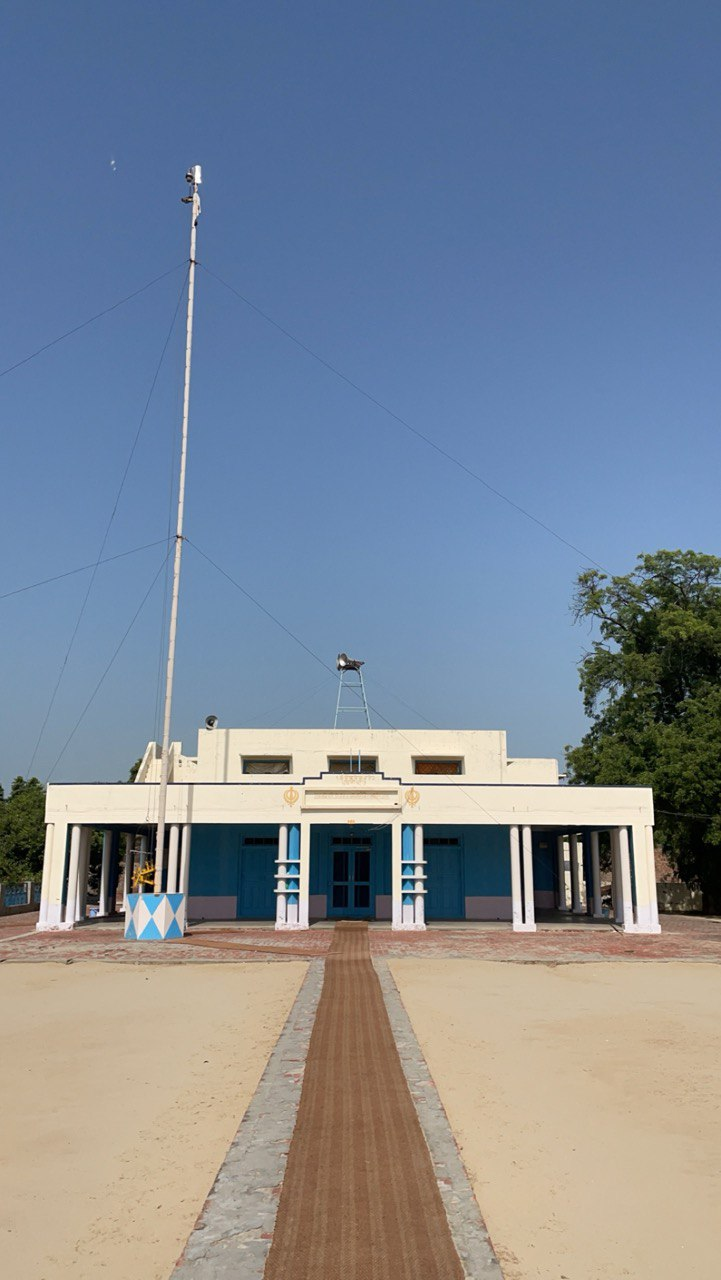
- Gurudwara in the village

- Location in Punjab, India Landhe Ke (India)
- Coordinates: 30°50′23″N 75°10′39″E
- Country: India
- State: Punjab
- District: Moga
- Elevation: 217 m (712 ft)

Population (2011)
  - Total: 4,915
- Sex ratio 884 ♀

Languages
  - Official: Punjabi
- Time zone: UTC+5:30 (IST)
- PIN: 142001
- ISO 3166 code: IN-PB
- Vehicle registration: PB- 29

Landhe Ke is a village in the Moga district in Punjab, India. It is near Moga and is part of the municipal council of Moga city as ward numbers 1 and 50. There is one gurdwara in the village made in the memories of two Sants who live there, Sant Baba Surat Singh and Sant Baba Ram Singh. Sant Nagar is situated near this village.
