= Punjabi folklore =

Folklore from Punjab

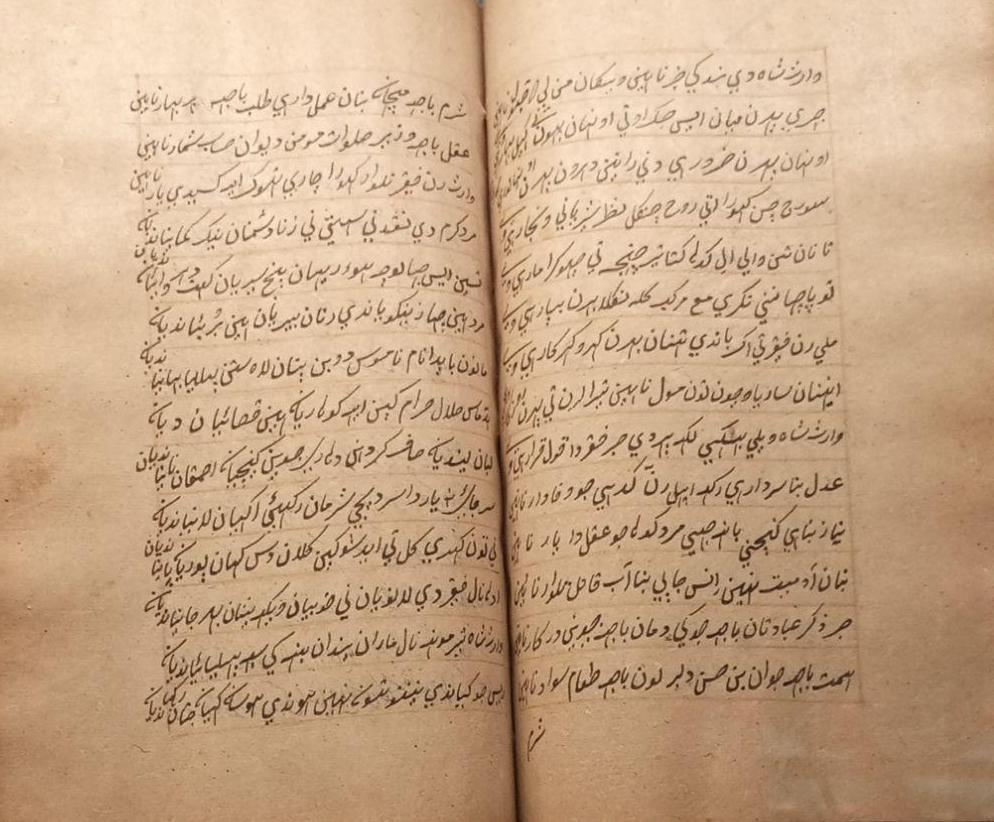
Folios of a manuscript of Heer Waris Shah (Waris Shah's version of the Heer-Ranjha folktale), circa 19th century

Punjabi folklore (more particularly its folksongs) is a core part of the Punjabi culture. Other important components of Punjabi folklore are farces, anecdotes, idioms, folktales, and sayings.

== Research ==
=== Origin ===
Richard Carnac Temple argued in his 1884 work, The Legends of the Punjab, that the plot structure of Punjabi folktales and bardic poetry was indistinguishable from one another, albeit with the bardic poems being more textually conservative (as they had been governed by metre and rhyme due to being in verse form). This led him to believe that the folktales originated from the bardic literature, existing as degraded derivatives.

I hope to show here abundantly that the bardic poem and the folktale are constructed on precisely the same lines as far as the pure story goes, even where the former is fastened on to really historical characters and mixed up with the narrative of bona fide historical facts [which Temple evidently values]. The folktale is very often in fact a mere scene, or jumble of scenes, to be found in the poem, where only the marvellous story has been remembered, while the names and surroundings of the actors to whom it is attributed has [sic] been forgotten. (Temple, v-vi)

— Donald Haase quoting R. C. Temple, The Greenwood Encyclopedia of Folktales and Fairy Tales, page 895

=== Themes ===
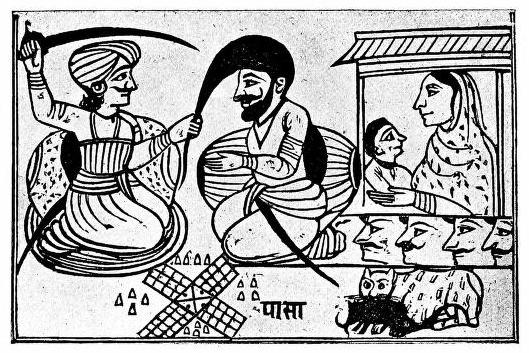
Depiction of Raja Rasalu beating Raja Sirikap in a game of chaupat (pasa), original sketch from a Punjabi storybook, reproduced by Charles Swynnerton in 'The Adventures of the Panjáb Hero Rájá Rasálu, and Other Folk-Tales of the Panjáb' (1884)

Punjabi folktales commonly incorporate stories involving animals which teach a moral lesson. This is a theme which originated in ancient India, with a surviving example being the Panchatantra of the third century BCE. Other prevalent themes found within Punjabi folklore is a suspcision of those in positions of power, and folly & pretense used for derision.

The heroine in Punjabi folktales (a pari/fairy or a princess) can be found inside a fruit or vegetable, which they are named after, or in the form of an animal, such as a mammal (monkey or goat) or a bird (swan or peacock/peahen).

=== History of study ===
Book cover of Tales of the Punjab by Flora Annie Steel

Academic folkloristic research into and the collecting of the large corpus of Punjabi folktales began during the colonial-era by Britishers, such as Flora Annie Steel's three papers on her studies of local Punjabi folktales (1880), with a translation of three fables into English, Richard Carnac Temple's The Legends of the Punjab (1884), Flora Annie Steel's Tales of the Punjab (1894), and Charles Frederick Usborne's Panjabi Lyrics and Proverbs (1905). Native Punjabis have also contributed to this field, with some names being Devendra Satyarthi, Mohinder Singh Randhawa, Amrita Pritam, Karnail Singh Thind, Sohinder Singh Wanjara Bedi, Giani Gurdit Singh, and Sukhdev Madpuri, whom have contributed published collections, encyclopedias, anthologies, and renditions in this field of study.

== List of Punjabi folklore ==
- The Adventures of Raja Rasalu
- The Legend of Raja Sálbán
- The Legend of Guru Gugga
- Puran Bhagat
- The Ballad of Sheikh Khokhar
- Heer Ranjha
- Mirza Sahiba
- Sassi Punnun
- Sohni Mahiwal
- Yusuf and Zulaikha
- The Ballad of Dulla Bhatti
- Dhola Maru

== See also ==
- Vaar
- Punjabi Qisse
- Mirasi
- Punjabi folk religion
- Punjabi folk music
