= Sant Nagar =

Sant Nagar (Punjabi-ਸੰਤ ਨਗਰ) is a small town located near village Landhe Ke in the Moga district of Punjab in India. Its ward number is 49. It is located 0.8 kilometre from Landhe Ke. Sant Nagar is located on Amritsar Road, which divides the town in two parts. The main religion of the people of Sant Nagar is Sikhism.
