= Marhi Da Deeva =

Marhi Da Deeva (transl. The Lamp of the Tomb) may refer to:

- Marhi Da Deeva (novel), a 1964 Punjabi-language novel by Indian writer Gurdial Singh
  - Marhi Da Deeva (film), a 1989 Indian Punjabi-language film, based on the novel
