= Arpana Caur =

Indian contemporary painter and graphic artist

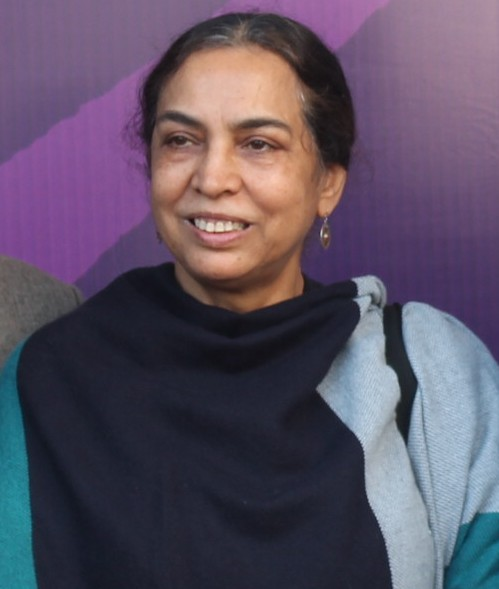
- Born: 1954 (age 71–72); Delhi, India
- Known for: Painting
- Mother: Ajeet Caur

Arpana Caur is an Indian contemporary painter and graphic artist. Caur focuses on depictions of women's conditions in modern India, life and death, violence, and the environment. Clothing is a recurring theme in her work, in reference to the established image of women.

== Early life and education ==
Arpana Caur (Note: Kaur or Caur (pronunciation kor) is a religious surname worn by all female Sikhs.) was born in 1954, in Delhi to a Sikh family who fled the Pakistani West Punjab to the Republic of India in 1947 during the confusion of the partition of British India. Her mother, Ajeet Caur, is a Panjabi-language writer. Caur adopted her first name, Arpana, at the age of fifteen, as an expression of her personal development.

She was exposed to art, music, and literature early in her life. She learned the sitar and wrote poetry, however she enjoyed painting the most. At the age of nine, she made her first oil painting, 'Mother & Daughter', inspired by the works of Amrita Shergil. Caur graduated from the University of Delhi with a Master of Arts degree in literature. She did not obtain formal education in painting, and was largely self taught. However, she received training in etching at the Garhi Studios in New Delhi, which she completed in 1982.

In a 2011 interview with Yashodhara Dalmia, when asked if she considered herself a feminist, Caur stated that she does not, as the themes she incorporates, or is curious about, go beyond gender and are ones that every human is faced with.

== Career ==
=== Influences and style ===
Caur's paintings draw from events and situations around her, with her work focusing on social issues that highlight the victimized. She has been influenced by existing traditions, namely those from the Gond, Godna, Madhubani, Pahari miniatures (hill-paintings), and folk art forms. Caur's mother's had a strong influence on her, which can be seen in her work, where the woman often occupies a central focus. Her work also draws from Punjabi literature.

Caur's works include watercolour and gauche paintings, and sculptures incorporating motifs, myths, and stories. Throughout her career, she has featured scissors as a motif so frequently that it has earned her the nickname kainchi.

Spirituality, time, life and death are recurring themes throughout her work. Nature and figures play a significant role in her storytelling.

In the 1990s, Caur created a series of collaborations with Indian folk artists from the Indigenous ethnic groups of Warli and Godna, who live in the Madhubani region of the Indian state of Bihar. She is one of the first contemporary artists to have collaborated with folk artisans.

In 1995, she was commissioned to create the mural 'Tears from Hiroshima' by the Hiroshima Museum of Modern Art, in order to commemorate the 50th anniversary of the bombing of Hiroshima. It was displayed at the Documenta in Kassel. Caur expressed fear at the temporary aspect of the installation. She included in the mural pots brimming with water, signifying tears within the context of the man-made tragedy.

=== Solo exhibitions ===
YEAR	EXHIBITION DETAILS
2009	Mural on Tiles for outer wall of SAARC Secretariat, Kathmandu
2007	Indigo Blue Gallery, Singapore
2005	Mahua Gallery, Bangalore
2004	Galerie Mueller & Plate, Munich
2003	Academy of Fine Arts and Literature, New Delhi
	October Gallery, London
2002	Cymroza Gallery, Mumbai
2001	Academy of Fine Arts and Literature, New Delhi
1999	CIMA Gallery, Kolkata
1998	Fine Art Resources, Berlin
	Foundation for Indian Artists Galerie, Amsterdam
	Cymroza Gallery, Mumbai
1997	Arks Gallery, London
1996	Sakshi Gallery, Mumbai and Bangalore
1994	Cymroza Gallery, Mumbai
1993	Rabindra Bhawan Gallery, New Delhi
1991	Collins Gallery, Glasgow
1988	Art Heritage New Delhi
1987	October Gallery, London
1985	Art Heritage, New Delhi
	Cymroza Gallery, Mumbai
1984	Ethnographic Museum, Stockholm
	National Museum, Copenhagen
	Jehangir Gallery, Mumbai
1982	Chapter Gallery, Cardiff
	Jehangir Gallery, Mumbai
	October Gallery, London
1981	City hall Gallery, Ottawa
1980	Jehangir Gallery, Mumbai
1979	Rabindra Bhawan Gallery, New Delhi
	Gallery Arts 38, London
1975	Shridharani Gallery, New Delhi

=== Group exhibitions ===
1995 Inside Out: Contemporary Women Artists of India, Middlesbrough Art Gallery

1992 Crossing Black Waters

1988 Graven Images

1988 Numaish Lait Kala

1984 First Indo- Greek Cultural Symposium and group shows, Athens and Delphi

1981 Executed two large murals for India International Trade Fair, New Delhi

==== Reviews, articles texts ====
Eddie Chambers, 'Inside Out: Contemporary Women Artists of India', Art Monthly no193, (February 1996) 35-37. Besides this, her work has been covered extensively in newspapers, magazines, art books and International Herald Tribune, Arts Review London, Citizen Ottawa, Die Welt and Dagens Nhyter Stockholm.

Caur has also been cinematically covered with numerous films and biopics by BBC London, Sidharth Tagore, Chandermani, Doordarshan and Raqs Media.

==== Film producer ====
In August 2026, she co-produced a drama film Rehmat, directed by Gurvinder Singh based on her mother's short stories, which made it to the 79th Locarno Film Festival in the Main Competition.

== Awards and honours ==
- 2017 B. C. Sanyal award.
- 2011 Rotary Club of Delhi: The Lifetime Achievement Award for Vocational Excellence
- 2010 Sikh Art and Film Foundation, New York: The Lifetime Achievement Award
- 2009 Chief Guest for Conferring B.F.A. degrees, Delhi College of Art Convocation
- 2007 T.K. Padamini Award, Kerala Govt.
- 2001 Advisory Committee Member: National Gallery of Modern Art Delhi, Lalit Kala Academy, and Sahitya Kala Parishad
- 1995–98 Selection Committee member, Republic Day Pageants for Ministry of Defence, Govt. of India
- 1995 Commissioned by Hiroshima Museum to excite a large work for its permanent collection on the occasion of the 50th Anniversary of the Holocaust
- 1991–92 Purchase Committee Member, National Gallery of Modern Art, New Delhi
- 1990–2000 Collaborated with Gonna artist Sat Narain Pandey and for the first time in India, co-signed works with him
- 1990–02 Jury Member, Republic Day Pageants New Delhi Nominated Eminent Artist by Lalit Kala Academy
- 1989 Jury Member, National Exhibition, New Delhi
- 1987 VI Triennele Gold Medal for Painting (International exhibition)
- 1986 Gold Medal at 6th India Triennale (awarded by the Lalit Kala Akademi)
- 1985 All India Fine Arts Society Award
- 1984 Research Grant from Lalit Kala Academy for painting in Garhi Studio, New Delhi

== Collections ==
Caur's paintings have been collected extensively in collections, both public and private, which include:

- Victoria and Albert Museum London
- Rockefeller Collection, New York
- Museum of Contemporary Art, Los Angeles
- Singapore Museum of Modern Art, Singapore
- National Gallery of Modern Art, New Delhi, Bangalore and Mumbai
- Government Museum and Art Gallery, Chandigarh
- Ethnographic Museum, Stockholm
- Kunst Museum, Düsseldorf
- Bradford Museum, Bradford, U.K
- Glenbarra Museum, Japan
- Deutsche Bank, Mumbai and Chandigarh
- Kapany Collection, San Francisco
- Asian Art Museum, San Francisco
- Jehangir Nicholson Art Foundation, Mumbai
- Birla Akademi Collection, Calcutta
- Peabody Essex Museum, Boston
- Reubens Museum, New York
- Venkatappa Museum (Roerich & Hebbar), Bangalore
- Bharat Bhawan, Bhopal
- Bengal Foundation, Dhaka
- J.K Kejriwal Museum Collection, Bangalore Dhaka Museum

== Social consciousness ==
Arpana Caur has led the Academy of Fine Arts & Literature which hosts the South Asian Literature Festival; strengthening bonds between authors from the subcontinent.

She is known to have successfully rallied against the felling of trees in New Delhi's Siri forest area during the construction of food courts and restaurants for the 2010 Commonwealth Games Village.

She supports a leprosy home in Ghaziabad in memory of her younger sister. The home also offers vocational training for young girls.
