= Apni Mitti =

- Created by: Suman Lata
- Directed by: Krishna Lamba
- Starring: see below
- Opening theme: "Apni Mitti" by Surjit Paatar
- Country of origin: India
- No. of seasons: 1
- No. of episodes: ??

Production
- Running time: approx. 22 minutes

Original release
- Network: Alpha ETC Punjabi
- Release: January 2007 – present

Apni Mitti is a Punjabi-language TV serial written by Kripal Kajak, which airs on Alpha ETC Punjabi from January 2007. The show is being shot in and around Chandigarh.

== Plot ==
The show is based on deception in human relationships. The story of the serial takes place in Sarangpur village near Chandigarh, where villagers gets lured by the bright lights and easy money of America, after their own lad Jimmy, who makes it big out there. The desperation to get to USA drives a few families of the village to take up drastic steps.

The story beautifully projects the shady side of human nature and women's tolerance and sacrifice in our male dominated society. The main character, Hardeep (played by Gurvinder), who fulfills his desire of going abroad by marrying to a village girl for a huge dowry later marries another Spanish girl in the US to gain material comforts out there.

Deception in human relationship is not the only theme of the story. The serial has also captured the realistic angle of exploitation of the gullible villagers at the hands of travel agents along with the hardships one has to face in an alien nation.

=== Cast ===
- Gurvinder Singh ... Hardeep
- Ashok Bali ... Jimmy
- Shabinder Mahal
- Gurkirtan Singh
- Parminder Pal Kaur
- Sahib Singh
- Vijay Tandon
- Meenu Kumari
- Jonita Doda
- Nirmal Rishi
- Amarpreet Bitly
- Jagtar Jagi
- Bitly Maan
