= Ajeet Cour =

Indian writer

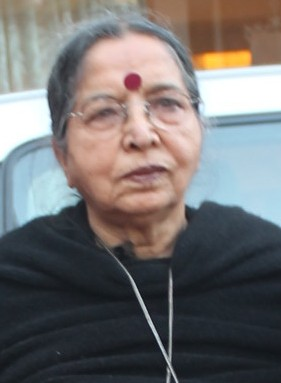
- Born: 16 November 1934 (age 91); Lahore, Punjab Province, British India
- Education: M.A. Economics
- Occupations: Writer, poet, and novelist
- Spouse: Rajinder Singh (m. 1952)
- Children: Arpana Caur, Kendi Caur
- Writing career
- Genres: Novel, short story, memoir
- Notable work: Khanabadosh
- Notable awards: Sahitya Akademi Award (1985); Padma Shri (2006); Shiromani Sahityakar Award; Baba Bali Award

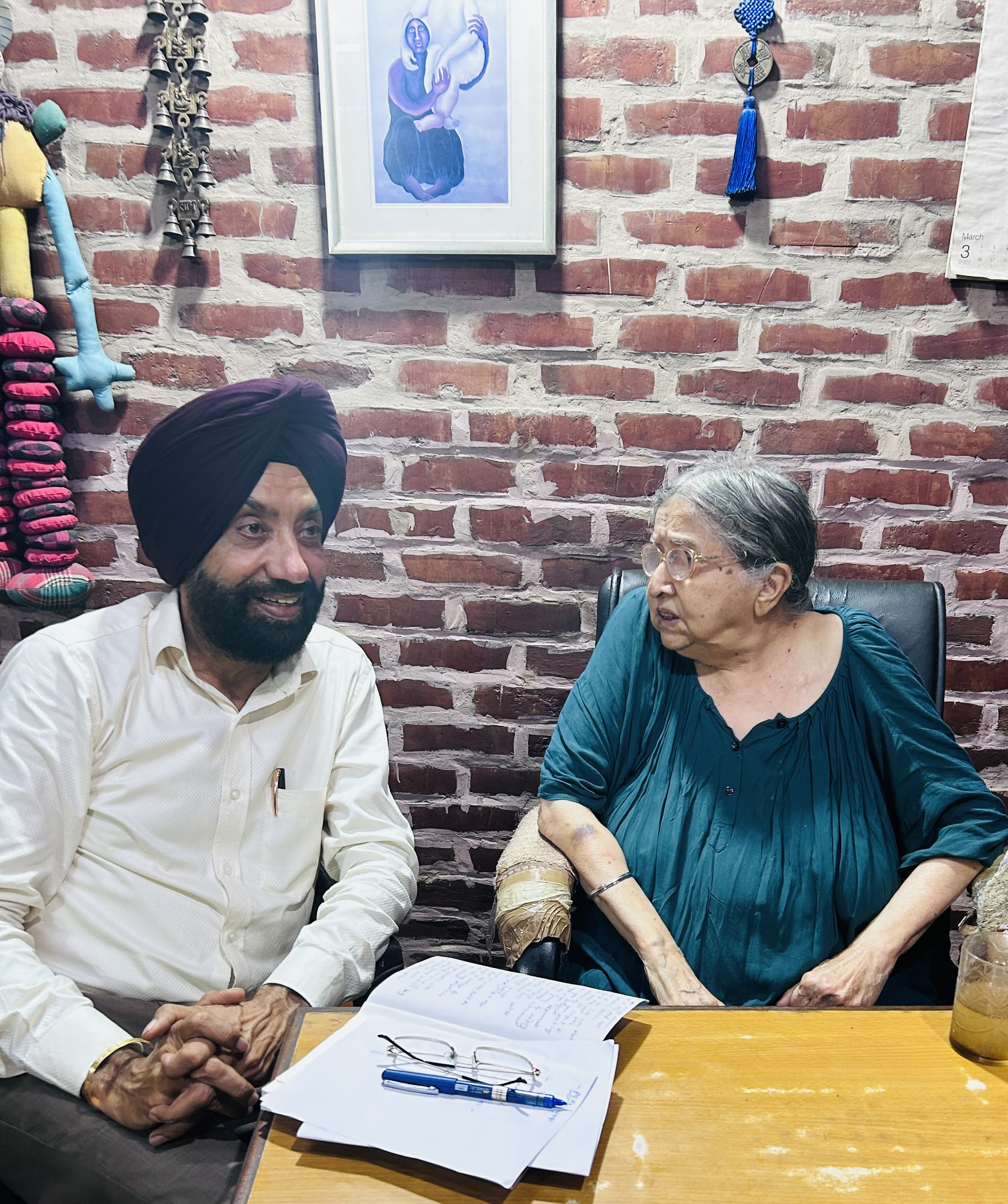
Ajit Cour and Harvinder Singh ( Chandigarh) ,Punjabi Language writers in Delhi,13 Sept. 2024 .

Ajeet Cour (born 1934) is an Indian writer who writes in Punjabi. She is a recipient of the Sahitya Akademi Award and the Padma Shri, the fourth-highest civilian award by the Government of India.

== Biography ==
Ajeet Cour was born in the family of Sardar Makhan Singh in 1934 in Lahore. She had her early education there. In her childhood, she was also taught by Kartar Singh Hitkari (father of Amrita Pritam). After the partition, her family came to Delhi, where she earned an M.A. (Economics).

She has written novels and short stories in the Punjabi language on social-realist themes such as the experience of women in relationships and their position in society. She received the Sahitya Akademi Award in 1985, the civilian honour of Padma Shri in 2006, and the Kuvempu Rashtriya Puraskar award in 2019. Her works include 19 short story anthologies, novellas and novels, as well as nine translations. She has also edited over 20 works. In her autobiography, Weaving Water, translated from the original Punjabi into English and published in 2018, she discusses surviving domestic violence from her husband.

In a review of one of her books of short stories, The Other Woman, Ziya Us Salam writes in The Hindu about the story "Ali Baba’s Death", "Exposing the double standards of our society, the endless urge to be among the haves and pretend to have more than we have, she takes many digs at our system." She was described by Kuldip Singh Dhir in The Tribune as a writer who "portrayed angry rebellious women around us." In a review of Pebbles in a Tin Drum, Suneet Chopra writes for Frontline, "For a society opening up to the market principle at the cost of its humanity, a process that is equally the driving force of consumer-packaged globalisation as the neo-Hindu swadeshi, her chronicle is a stark warning that India should take note of."

She served as the chairperson of the Academy of Art and Literature in New Delhi, and was part of the first delegation of Indian writers to visit Pakistan in 2003. She also served as the chairperson of the Foundation of SAARC writers and literature (FOSWAL).

In August 2026, a drama film Rehmat, directed by Gurvinder Singh was based on her short stories made it to the 79th Locarno Film Festival in the Main Competition.

== Works ==
- Gulbano (short story collection)
- Mehak di maut (short story collection)
- Butt Shikan (short story collection)
- Dhup wala shahr (novel)
- Gauri (novel)
- Post Mortem (novel)
- Koora Kabara (autobiography)
- Khanabadosh (autobiography)
- Weaving Water (autobiography) (2018)

== See also ==
- Surjit Patar
- Vir Singh (writer)
