= Samuel John =

Indian actor and theatre activist

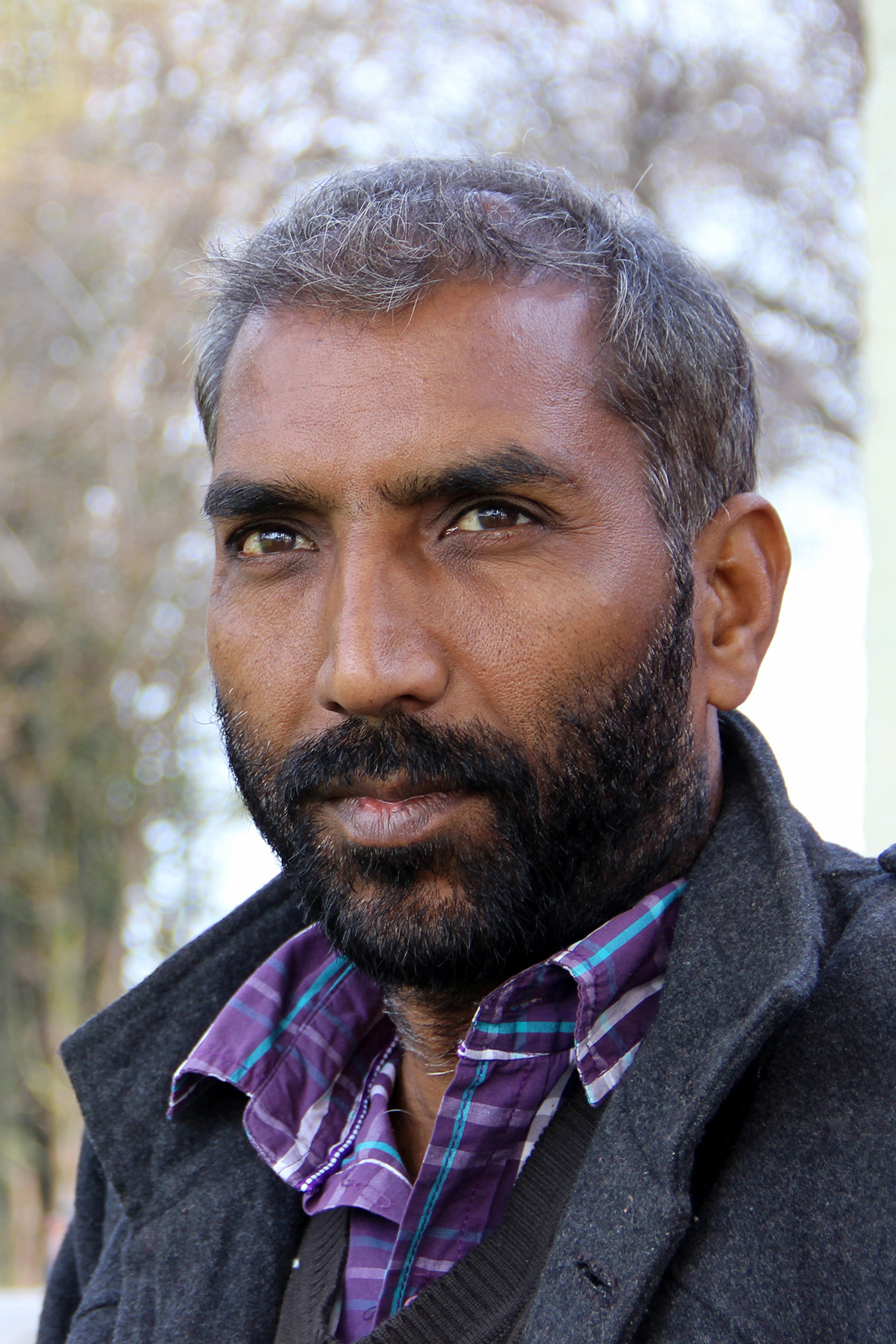
- Born: 18 April 1965 (age 61); Village Dhilwan, Faridkot district, Punjab, India
- Occupations: Actor and Theatre activist
- Years active: 1990–present
- Children: 1 daughter

Samuel John is an Indian actor and theatre activist. He played the role of the protagonist in the National Award-winning Punjabi film, Anhe Ghore Da Daan. He recently played a role in Punjabi movie Munda Hi Chahida as the father of Dharmender (Harish Verma) .

The highly acclaimed film Anhe Ghore Da Daan (English: Alms for a Blind Horse) won National Awards for Best Direction, Cinematography and Best Feature Film in Punjabi at the 59th National Film Awards of India.

== Biography ==
Born and brought up in the village of Dhilwan near Faridkot, Punjab, Samuel John did his graduation in humanities from Kotkapura and then post-graduation in Theatre and Television from Punjabi University, Patiala. He works with his small group, Peoples' Theatre, Lehragaga, to stage plays mostly in rural areas of Punjab.

== Theatre ==
Samuel acted in a single actor play Jooth based on autobiography of Om Prakash Valmiki, adapted in Punjabi by Balram. First staged by Media Artists, the play has had many shows thereafter. Samuel also directed for Media Artists, the Punjabi adaptation of Shakespeare's Macbeth by Balram. Other notable plays that he has directed or acted in, include, Maat Lok, Tain Ki Dard Na Aaya, Ghasia Hoia Aadmi and Baagan Da Raakha. Samuel John is the founder of Peoples theatre Lehragaga. The group is active in rural areas of Punjab touring around with its body of plays, generally staging in the street corners.

== Movies ==
- Dhoondte Reh Jaoge! (1998)
- Anhe Ghore Da Daan (2011)
- Aatu Khoji (short film) (2010)
- Police in Pollywood (2014)
- Asees (Punjabi Movie) (2018)
- TAKKHI (short film) (2018)
- Munda Hi Chahida (Punjabi Movie) (2019)
- Kaali Khuhi (2020)

== Web series ==
- Kohrra (2023)
