= Suvinder Vicky =

Indian film actor (born 1969)

- Born: 4 March 1973 (age 53); Sirsa, Haryana, India
- Education: Punjabi University (M. A.)
- Occupation: Actor
- Years active: 2004–present
- Spouse: Gursharan Kaur Maan

Suvinder Vicky, also known as Savinderpal Vicky (born 1973), is an Indian actor, known for his performance of the truck driver, Ghalib, in Meel Patthar (2020), his portrayal of the policeman, Balbir, in the Netflix series Kohrra (2023), for playing the role of Brigadier Jahangir in Dhurandhar: The Revenge (2026), and appearing as the police officer, Sugga, in Satluj (2026). After first appearing in Full Tension in 1995, he played in Des Hoyaa Pardes (2004), Udta Punjab (2016), and Kesari (2019).

== Early life and education ==
Suvinder Vicky was born in 1973 in Sirsa, Haryana, India, to Harbans Lal Kamboj and Amarjit Kaur. He gained a Master of Arts in Theatre and Television from Punjabi University, Patiala.

== Career ==
Over the years, Vicky appeared in several Hindi-language films and streaming series, including Udta Punjab (2016), Kesari (2019), Pataal Lok (2020), and Dhurandhar: The Revenge (2026). He also worked in Punjabi cinema, where he played supporting and character roles across a range of genres.

In 2023, Vicky received widespread critical acclaim for his lead performance as Balbir Singh in the Netflix crime drama Kohrra. Critics praised his restrained portrayal of a police officer dealing with personal and professional conflicts, with many identifying the role as a breakthrough in his career. The series gained international recognition and introduced his work to a broader audience and won Filmfare OTT Award for Best Actor.

== Awards ==
For his performance in Meel Patthar, Vicky won the Best Actor award at the 2020 Silver Screen Awards and the Best Actor in a Feature Film award at the Critics' Choice Film Awards in 2022.

== Filmography ==
Key
†	Denotes films that have not yet been released

=== Films ===
Year	Title	Role	Language	Ref.
2004	Des Hoyaa Pardes	Sukhbeer Singh	Punjabi	
2005	Jija Ji	Auto-Rickshaw Driver	Punjabi	
2009	Munde U.K. De		Punjabi	
2010	Kabaddi Ikk Mohabbat	Daana	Punjabi	
2012	Yaraan Naal Baharaan 2	Khaarku Singh	Punjabi	
2013	Sikander	Politician	Punjabi	
2015	The Fourth Direction	Joginder	Punjabi	
2016	Kaptaan		Punjabi	
2016	Udta Punjab	Kukku	Hindi	
2017	Super Singh		Punjabi	
2018	5 Weddings	SSP Avtar Singh Gill	Hindi	
2018	Laatu	Naahra	Punjabi	
2019	Kesari	Naik Lal Singh	Hindi	
2020	Khatre Da Ghuggu		Punjabi	
2020	Zakhmi	Nishan Singh Buttar	Punjabi	
2020	Udna Gear	MLA Harinder Singh Gill	Punjabi	
2020	Meel Patthar	Ghalib	Hindi	
2021	Happy Happy Ho Gaya		Punjabi	
2021	Ucha Pind	Tilka	Punjabi	
2021	Siyasat	Tara Singh	Punjabi	
2022	Nishana	Fauji Hakam Singh	Punjabi	
2024	Bhaiyya Ji	Chandrabhan Singh	Hindi	
2024	Sucha Soorma	Hawaldar	Punjabi	
2026	Dhurandhar: The Revenge	Brigadier Jahangir	Hindi	
2026	Satluj	SSP Surjit Singh Sugga	Hindi	
2026	Rehmat		Punjabi, English	
2026	Awarapan 2	Jaideep	Hindi	

=== Television ===
Year	Title	Role	Language	Ref.
2020	Paatal Lok	Balbir Singh Sekhon	Hindi	
2022	Cat	Sehtab Singh	Punjabi	
2023	Kohrra	SI Balbir Singh	Punjabi	
2023	Chamak	Jugal	Hindi	
2026	Shabad – Reet Aur Riwaaz	Harminder Singh	Punjabi	
2026	Glory	Raghubir Singh	Hindi	
