= Shabad – Reet Aur Riwaaz =

- Genre: Coming-of-age; Drama
- Created by: Jayati Pandya
- Directed by: Ameet Guptha
- Starring: Suvinder Vicky; Mihir Ahuja; Taranjit Kaur; Maahi Raj Jain; Yash Sehgal; Tejas Mathur
- Country of origin: India
- Original languages: Hindi; Punjabi
- No. of seasons: 1
- No. of episodes: 6

Production
- Executive producer: Aarif Shaikh
- Producers: Mayank Yadav; Shantanu Singh; Karanveer Sofat; Ajit Manirkar
- Cinematography: Satish Shetty
- Editor: Dharmesh Patel
- Production company: Rusk Media

Original release
- Network: ZEE5
- Release: February 6, 2026 – present

Shabad – Reet Aur Riwaaz is an Indian Hindi and Punjabi coming-of-age drama streaming television series directed by Ameet Guptha. Produced by Rusk Media, the series stars Suvinder Vicky and Mihir Ahuja. The story follows Ghuppi Singh, a 16-year-old with a stutter, who struggles between his passion for football and his father's demand that he continue the family's Ragi singing tradition. The series premiered on ZEE5 on 6 February 2026.

== Plot ==
Set in the fictional town of Sukhtaalpur, Punjab, Ghuppi Singh faces immense pressure from his father, Harminder, a renowned Ragi singer. Harminder insists Ghuppi carry forward the family legacy, but Ghuppi's interests lie in football. After Ghuppi skips music practice for football, Harminder issues an ultimatum: Ghuppi must sing a shabad on Gurupurab day.

Throughout the series, Ghuppi deals with school bullies and a new rival-turned-friend, Naitik, who helps him with speech therapy. The tension peaks when Ghuppi discovers his football selection match falls on the same day as Gurupurab. Ultimately, the family reaches a point of reconciliation when Harminder recognizes the importance of being a good human over rigid tradition.

== Cast ==
- Suvinder Vicky as Harminder Singh
- Mihir Ahuja as Ghuppi Singh
- Taranjit Kaur as Manjot
- Maahi Raj Jain as Ginni
- Yash Sehgal as Naitik
- Tejas Mathur as Karan
- Sushant Kanya as Abhishek
- Kavya Pandit as Simran

== Episodes ==
No.	Title	Directed by	Written by	Original release date
1	"Gurudwara da agla raagi"	Ameet Guptha	Jayati Pandya, Sameer Satija, Krishnakant Jonalgadda, Akhil Sachdeva	6 February 2026
Revered Ragi singer Harminder publicly announces that his son Ghuppi will carry forward the family's musical legacy, despite Ghuppi's chronic stutter and secret interest in football.
2	"Ghuppi de sapne"	Ameet Guptha	Jayati Pandya, Sameer Satija, Krishnakant Jonalgadda, Akhil Sachdeva	6 February 2026
Ghuppi's mother, Manjot, negotiates a deal allowing Ghuppi to play football if he attends music rehearsals daily, but Ghuppi soon finds himself disqualified from the school team.
3	"Janamdin Da Tohfa"	Ameet Guptha	Jayati Pandya, Sameer Satija, Krishnakant Jonalgadda, Akhil Sachdeva	6 February 2026
After clearing his name with Naitik's help, Ghuppi's stutter is exposed during his birthday party, leading to a public humiliation in front of his father's boss.
4	"Mai changa puttar nahi hoon maa"	Ameet Guptha	Jayati Pandya, Sameer Satija, Krishnakant Jonalgadda, Akhil Sachdeva	6 February 2026
Manjot takes Ghuppi to speech therapy while Harminder's workplace frustrations boil over. A domestic confrontation occurs when Harminder finds Ghuppi with his football gear.
5	"Ragi hone da asli matlab"	Ameet Guptha	Jayati Pandya, Sameer Satija, Krishnakant Jonalgadda, Akhil Sachdeva	6 February 2026
Following a major family showdown, Ghuppi witnesses his father's vulnerability and commits to honoring the Gurupurab musical ultimatum.
6	"Shabad di Reet"	Ameet Guptha	Jayati Pandya, Sameer Satija, Krishnakant Jonalgadda, Akhil Sachdeva	6 February 2026
At the Gurudwara, Ghuppi breaks tradition by naming his sister Ginni as the next family Ragi. Harminder reconciles with the family and supports Ghuppi at his district football match.

== Release ==
The official trailer for the series was released on 29 January 2026. The series premiered in its entirety on the streaming platform ZEE5 on 6 February 2026.
