= Rehmat =

2026 Indian drama film

- International promotional poster
- Directed by: Gurvinder Singh
- Screenplay by: Gurvinder Singh
- Produced by: Gurvinder Singh; Arpana Caur
- Starring: Naseeruddin Shah; Suvinder Vicky; Diya Kamboj; Mita Vashisht
- Cinematography: Shashank Walia
- Edited by: Dupinder Kaur
- Production companies: Vahao Studio; Pavo Films
- Release date: 6 August 2026 (Locarno)
- Running time: 157 minutes
- Countries: India; France
- Languages: Punjabi; English

Rehmat is a 2026 Punjabi-language drama film written and directed by Gurvinder Singh, and based on the short stories by Ajeet Cour. A co-production between India and France, it stars Naseeruddin Shah as Rashid Ali, and follows unfolds three interconnected stories.

The film had its world premiere at the main competition of the 79th Locarno Film Festival on 6 August 2026, where it competed for the Golden Leopard.

== Synopsis ==
Set in present-day Punjab, the film interweaves three narrative strands. One follows a young woman who shelters and tends to an injured man while hiding him from the authorities. Another centers on a household marked by the disappearance of the father and children growing up without him and an elderly grandfather compelled to resume the role of family head. The third story introduces an old man who arrives in a village claiming 'to be God'. Naseeruddin Shah portrays Rashid Ali, whose family left Punjab just before the 1947 Partition reshaped the region’s borders; after decades in England, he returns to the village of his birth, confronting memory, belonging, and the splinters of history.

== Cast ==
- Naseeruddin Shah as Rashid Ali
- Suvinder Vicky
- Diya Kamboj
- Mita Vashisht
- Harwinder Aujla as Balwinder
- Jaswant Zafar as Harjap
- Navjot Randhawa
- Anita Meet
- Inder Bajwa
- Sahej Aziz
- Jasmanpreet Singh as Harman
- Kavnoor Kaur

== Production ==
The title "Rehmat" holds particular meaning for director Gurvinder Singh. The term, shared across Arabic, Persian, Urdu, and Punjabi, is commonly understood as compassion, yet Singh has observed that it suggests something broader—a historical circulation of ideas, beliefs, and cultural forms that have shaped Punjab's identity through centuries of Sufi movement, migration, and upheaval. As he explains, "'Rehmat' portrays how people in a culturally and religiously diverse land navigate life, dealing with divisive political forces, yet retaining hope and compassion." The screenplay of the film is adapted by the director from short stories by Ajeet Cour. The ensemble cast includes Suvinder Vicky, Mita Vashisht, Diya Kamboj, Navjot Randhawa and the Punjabi poet Jaswant Zafar, marking his screen debut in the role of Harjap, the aging patriarch. The film is co-produced by Vahao Studio and the Paris-based production company Pavo Films.

== Release ==
Rehmat had its World Premiere at the 79th Locarno Film Festival on 6 August 2026, and competed for Golden Leopard.

== Reception ==
Stéphanie Linda Maserin of Close-up: Stories of Vision at the Locarno Film Festival awarded the film three out of four stars. She described the film as "a flowing hymn to solidarity and brotherhood in contemporary Punjab, constructed by stringing together three stories by the veteran writer Ajeet Cour." Writing for The Wire, Tatsam Mukherjee wrote that the film was "Gurvinder Singh's idea of how he wants to see India: warm, thoughtful and neighbourly."

== Accolades ==
Award	Date of ceremony	Category	Recipient	Result	Ref.
Locarno Film Festival	15 August 2026	Golden Leopard	Rehmat	Nominated	
Locarno Film Festival	15 August 2026	Pardo for Change	Rehmat	Nominated	
