= The Fourth Direction =

- Film poster
- Punjabi: Chauthi Koot
- Directed by: Gurvinder Singh
- Written by: Waryam Singh Sandhu; Gurvinder Singh
- Based on: Chauthi Koot and Hun Main Theek-Thaak Haan by Waryam Singh Sandhu
- Produced by: Kartikeya Narayan Singh
- Starring: Suvinder Vicky; Rajbir Kaur; Kanwaljit Singh; Harnek Aulakh; Gurpreet Bhangu
- Cinematography: Satya Rai Nagpaul
- Edited by: Bhupesh 'Micky' Sharma
- Music by: Marc Marder
- Production companies: The Film Café; NFDC
- Release dates: May 15, 2015 (Cannes Film Festival); June 8, 2016 (France); August 5, 2016 (India)
- Running time: 115 minutes
- Country: India
- Language: Punjabi

The Fourth Direction (Punjabi: Chauthi Koot) is a 2015 Indian Punjabi-language drama film directed by Gurvinder Singh. It is based on the short stories The Fourth Direction and I Am Feeling Fine Now from Indian author Waryam Singh Sandhu's 2005 collection Chauthi Koot. The film is produced by Kartikeya Narayan Singh and is set around the Sikh separatist movement of the 1980s. It is the second part of Singh’s Punjab Trilogy, after Alms for a Blind Horse (2011), and is followed by Crescent Night (2022).

It was screened in the Un Certain Regard section at the 2015 Cannes Film Festival. It won the Silver Screen Award at the Singapore International Film Festival for Best Asian Feature Film in December 2015.

The film was shot mostly around Amritsar and Ferozepur in Punjab, India.

== Plot ==
The film plot synthesises two different stories set in a post-Operation Blue Star Punjab in the '80s. Fear and paranoia pervade the atmosphere as the general public is caught between excesses of both Khalistani militants and the Indian government forces fighting them. The first story is about a militant diktat in Punjab that prohibited family-owned dogs from barking, and the other is about two Hindu friends travelling to Amritsar in a nearly empty train. The film merges the two plots into one by making one of the friends travelling in the train recount the first story.

The film opens with two Hindu friends Jugal and Raj looking for a train to Amritsar late in the evening. Having missed the last passenger train, they, along with a Sikh man in the same position, force their way onto a freight train. The small compartment already has a security man and two other young Sikhs besides a couple of train employees. The fearful atmosphere makes Jugal recount to Raj an earlier incident involving him, his wife and their young daughter.

The film goes into flashback. Lost at night in the countryside, Jugal, his wife and daughter reach a farmhouse in the outskirts of the village. While they are frightened to knock at the isolated house, they are not left with much choice. The family in the house, also suspicious at first, later lets them in, as the head of the house Joginder shows them the direction to take.

Later at night, Joginder and his family are visited by the Sikh militants who demand Joginder that he kill the family dog for drawing attention with its incessant barking. The family woes continue the next morning when the paramilitary men arrive looking for the separatists. They turn the house upside down before leaving.

The narrative moves back to the train on its way as the guard asks his unwanted passengers to leave before anyone notices them.

== Cast ==
- Suvinder Vicky as Joginder
- Rajbir Kaur
- Harleen Kaur
- Taranjit Singh
- Kanwaljeet Singh as Jugal
- Harnek Aulakh
- Gurpreet Bhangu as grandmother
- Tejpal Singh as Sikh Passenger

== Reception ==
The film premiered at Debussy Theatre in Cannes to a full house where it received a ten minute standing ovation, reported film critic Uma Da Cunha in The Citizen. She noted "the film excels in the minimal devices it uses for dramatising what it says, relying on facial expressions, individual responses and a simple unveiling of events to convey its harrowing story" adding that "The technical skills in every aspect of the film is what hits the viewer. The visuals impress and linger, the clarity of sound enhances every moment, and the striking music track resounds in the silence attached to the visuals."

Reviewing the film for Variety magazine, Jay Weissberg called it "handsome yet ineffectual take on Hindu-Sikh tensions in the 1980s" adding that "formalist attractions don’t equal dramatic strengths in the film." "While he succeeds in capturing the crushing unease of the countryside, full of uncertain, frightened glances, Singh neglects dramatic construction, jeopardizing audience empathy," Weissberg wrote.

In her review for The Hollywood Reporter Deborah Young wrote that the film "takes a very roundabout route in portraying the fear, paranoia and violence of the 1980’s" while "offering an insider’s glimpse into the rural Sikh community in India’s Punjab". Commenting on the minimalist style of the movie, she wrote that "working in miniature..the film pays a steep price in terms of a drama that involved thousands of violent deaths and lead to the assassination of Indira Gandhi."

"Singh’s directorial choices are often remarkably effective, whether in the camera angles, the long travelling shots, the nervous tension and insecurity transmitted in every glance and reflected in every silence and echoed in every sound," wrote Dan Fainaru for Screen Daily while commenting on the pace of the movie as "self-indulgent". "Prolonged sequences and themes repetitively overstated – risk alienating viewers to the point where 30 minutes less would be so much more," he wrote in his review.

== Accolades ==
Year	Name of Competition	Category	Result	Recipient(s)/Nominee(s)	Ref(s)
2015	2015 Cannes Film Festival	Un Certain Regard Award	Nominated	Gurvinder Singh	
2015	17th Mumbai Film Festival	Golden Gateway of India Award for Best Film	Won	Gurvinder Singh	
2015	2015 Singapore International Film Festival	Best Asian Feature Film	Won	Gurvinder Singh	
2016	63rd National Film Awards	Best Feature Film in Punjabi	Won	Producer(s): NFDC and Kartikeya Singh; Director: Gurvinder Singh	
2016	10th Asia Pacific Screen Awards	Best Screenplay	Nominated	Gurvinder Singh; Waryam Singh Sandhu	
2017	1st Filmfare Punjabi Awards	Best Cinematography	Won	Satya Nagpaul	
2017	1st Filmfare Punjabi Awards	Best Original Story	Nominated	Waryam Singh Sandhu	
2017	1st Filmfare Punjabi Awards	Best Film (Critics)	Won	Gurvinder Singh	
