= Satluj (film) =

2026 Indian film by Honey Trehan

- Official release poster
- Directed by: Honey Trehan
- Written by: Honey Trehan; Niren Bhatt; Utsav Maitra
- Dialogues by: Honey Trehan; Niren Bhatt
- Produced by: Ronnie Screwvala; Abhishek Chaubey; Honey Trehan
- Starring: Diljit Dosanjh; Arjun Rampal; Kanwaljit Singh; Suvinder Vicky; Geetika Vidya Ohlyan; Rahul Mittra
- Narrated by: Arjun Rampal
- Cinematography: K. U. Mohanan
- Edited by: A. Sreekar Prasad
- Music by: Marc Marder
- Production companies: RSVP Movies; MacGuffin Pictures
- Distributed by: ZEE5
- Release date: 3 July 2026
- Running time: 164 minutes
- Country: India
- Languages: Hindi; Punjabi
- Budget: US$4.5 million

Satluj is a 2026 Indian biographical drama film directed by Honey Trehan and jointly produced by Ronnie Screwvala, Abhishek Chaubey and Trehan through RSVP Movies and MacGuffin Pictures respectively. The film is based on the life of the human rights activist Jaswant Singh Khalra. Written by Trehan with Niren Bhatt and Utsav Maitra, the film stars Diljit Dosanjh alongside Arjun Rampal, Kanwaljit Singh, Suvinder Vicky and Geetika Vidya Ohlyan. It follows Khalra's investigation into enforced disappearances and extrajudicial killings carried out by Punjab Police during the Punjab insurgency of the early 1990s.

The film faced several obstacles in its release, originally being titled 'Ghallughara', (and even subsequently 'Punjab 95') with its release planned in 2023. The Central Board of Film Certification ordered many alterations to allow it a certificate, making the filmmakers chose not to release it in theatres instead. Its release was stalled for 3 years, before being digitally released on ZEE5 on 3 July 2026. The film was taken down from ZEE5 around 2 days later for Indian viewers. Later, the film was also removed from ZEE5 for international viewers.

== Plot ==
The film begins with a group of policemen of the Punjab Police stopping a car and killing all the people in the car under the guise of a police encounter.

Jaswant Singh Khalra, a bank employee in Amritsar lives happily with his wife along with his two children. After the disappearance and death of his friend Kirpal Singh, he realizes that Kirpal's mother, Gurpej, has become mentally unstable. On his daughter's birthday, Jaswant visits his parents telling them to come and celebrate their granddaughter's birthday, however, he is told that Gurpej is missing. He visits the local police station, but the police officers offer him no help and dismiss the case, saying she was "a terrorist's mother". Jaswant later visits a hospital to see if Gurpej was admitted or not, and finds out she was not.

Jaswant visits the morgue of the hospital to see if Gurpej is there or not. On showing the photo of Gurpej, the doctor is about to tell him about her just when a compounder and a constable arrives which resulted in Jaswant not getting the details of Gurpej. Upon enquiring with the constable named Satnam, who is also his childhood friend, he reveals that Gurpej was brutally murdered by the corrupt police officers and sent for post-mortem. Jaswant later finds from a local crematorium that dead bodies have recently been arriving to the crematorium in large numbers and most of them are reported as "unclaimed" instead of first being returned to their families. Upon hearing this, Jaswant decides to fight for justice. He asks for Satnam's help who is first hesitant, but Jaswant is able to convince him upon speaking to him at a gurdwara.

Meanwhile, the murders continue and Jaswant travels to Canada and other countries to unite the Sikh community and get people to raise their voice against the gruesome murders in Punjab. On the other hand, the Chief Minister of Punjab and highly ranked police officers faces pressure from the media regarding the murders. To cover up the incident, the police officers falsely accused the murdered people of illegal weapon trafficking to ease their pressure.

Jaswant collects missing persons information from a few crematoriums and shares it with different human rights international forum which ultimately creates immense pressure on the police. DGP Bitta brings in SSP Sugga to pressurize Jaswant to withdraw his proceedings. SSP Sugga kills constable Satnam along with family for leaking information to Jaswant.

After seeing all of this, an officer of the Punjab police kills the Chief Minister of Punjab in a suicide blast. This results in not only the death of the Chief Minister, but also of many other Punjab Police officers. Jaswant holds the Punjab Police accountable for this attack, saying they should have had better security and this attack was done out of anger towards their actions.

Having enough of Jaswant, Sugga and his fellow officers kidnap him from his house while he is cleaning his car. Jaswant's journalist friend Sanjiv tries to stop them but to no avail.

Samudra Singh, Additional Director, CBI is assigned the missing case of Jaswant. Samudra starts interrogation and finds out police officials are responsible for missing case of Jaswant. DGP Bitta retires and the new DGP gives Sugga an ultimatum to find Jaswant. In the meantime, prior to their appearance in the court, the witnesses collected by Samudra Singh are either pressured to turn hostile or killed. The court suspends all the police officers along with Sugga. Sugga unable to bear the pressure commits suicide.

Samudra goes to SPO Kuljit Singh, one of the members involved in the killings. Kuljit, who agrees to testify in Jaswant's favor and tell the truth, backs out in court and tells lies to defend the police. Samudra, as a result of his hostility towards Kuljit during the court session, is told to "take a break" and that somebody else will take over the case. That night, Kuljit sees a dream where Jaswant, who is in horrible condition, comes to him and tells him about the cold of the river. Kuljit goes to Samudra and says he will testify and tell the truth, saying that earlier he feared the police, but now he fears God.

The day of the court case, Kuljit walks into the court with police protection and now wearing a turban. He tells the whole court how Jaswant was kidnapped, tortured, and eventually murdered, much to the dismay of the guilty officers who are in the court. Jaswant's wife cries as she hears Kuljit tell the story.

The movie ends by telling the viewers that Kuljit was murdered before he could testify in High Court. It then talks about how many people lost their lives during the period of insurgency in Punjab. It also talks about Jaswant Singh's legacy, and how his wife continued to fight for human rights, parks have been named after him, and the day he died is still commemorated till this day by Sikhs around the world.

== Cast ==
- Diljit Dosanjh as Jaswant Singh Khalra
- Arjun Rampal as Samudra Singh, Additional Director, CBI
- Kanwaljit Singh as DGP Inderpal Singh Bitta (based on KPS Gill)
- Suvinder Vicky as SSP Surjit Singh Sugga (based on Ajit Singh Sandhu)
- Geetika Vidya Ohlyan as Paramjit Kaur Khalra "Pammi"
- S. M. Zaheer as CM Anant Singh (based on Beant Singh)
- Saurabh Sachdeva as Senior Constable Satnam Singh
- Amit Dhawan as DSP Jagpal Singh
- Varun Badola as Advocate Ravinder Jais (based on Adv. Rajvinder Singh Bains)
- Arvinder Singh Gill as CM Gurcharan Singh Bohra (based on Harcharan Singh Brar)
- Nassar as DGP S. P. Varma
- Rahul Mittra as Inspector J Randhava
- Jyoti Dogra as Bibi Gurpej Kaur Bannowal
- Bhupender Singh as Kirpal Singh Bannowal
- Amardeep Jha as Satnam Singh's mother
- Jagjeet Sandhu as SPO (Note: Special Police Officer) Kuljit Singh (based on SPO Kuldeep Singh Bachra, an eye witness)
- Vansh Bhardwaj as Inspector Shivender Singh
- Vikas Mohla as SI Harinder Singh
- Akhilesh Dwivedi as SI Tejinder Singh
- Ramji Bali as Inspector Ajay Kumar
- Milind Dhaimade as CBI Chief Bhullar
- Anurag Arora as Government Official
- Amardeep Singh Gill as MLA Mahinderpal Singh
- Anil Mange as Sanjiv Singh (based on Rajiv Singh Randhawa, an eye witness)
- Anjuman Saxena as High Court Judge
- Geeta Agarwal Sharma as Geeta Basra, a Medical Officer, related to the mortuary-related incidents (loosely based on the nurse, Baljeet Kaur, of Patti area)
- Corinne Meadors as Colleen Beaumier

== Production ==
=== Development ===
In 2020, Honey Trehan began his research for the film, eventually compiling about 1800 pages of research, including witness statements and court testimony.

Trehan and Utsav Maitra (who also served as the associate director of the film) had completed co-writing two drafts by the time, co-writer Niren Bhatt came on-board.

Trehan and Bhatt later developed the script for a year, which included travelling for a month across various districts in Punjab.

=== Casting ===
Diljit Dosanjh chose to forgo his remuneration for the project, to portray Jaswant Singh Khalra, charging a symbolic ₹1 to fulfil contractual formalities.

=== Filming ===
Principal photography began in 2021 and the filming wrapped up in 2022.

=== Post-production ===
The film was initially titled as Ghallughara, which means historical massacre of Sikhs. In December 2022, the film was stuck in a six month long certification process, with the CBFC demanding 21 cuts and a title change. Later, the production house challenged the decision in Bombay High Court. After intervention of Shiromani Gurdwara Parbandhak Committee, the film was decided to be released uncut, but with its new title Punjab '95, after objections were raised by CBFC on the previous title. Later, the revising committee of CBFC reviewed the film and demanded more than 120 cuts. The official trailer was removed from YouTube in India, a day after its release. An uncut international release was announced for 7 February 2025, in multiple countries, excluding India. However, the release was postponed once again for undisclosed reasons. Trehan and Dosanjh said they would not release a version of the film altered to meet the board's demands.

== Soundtrack ==
Satluj

Soundtrack album by Marc Marder
- Released: 13 July 2026
- Length: 9:20
- Language: Punjabi
- Label: Sangeet Music

Marc Marder chronology
We Are the Fruits of the Forest (2025)	Satluj (2026)

Official audio
- Satluj – Full Album on YouTube

All music is composed by Marc Marder.

Track listing
No.	Title	Lyrics	Singer(s)	Length
1.	"Gurmukh Laha Lei Gaye" (Tabla: Gurinder; Pal Singh; Rabab: Mahabir Singh Rana, Sandeep Singh)	Traditional Gurbani Shabad	Bhai Harjinder Singh Srinagar Wale; Side accompanist: Jaspreet Singh	6:29
2.	"Satnam Shri Waheguru"	Traditional; Gurbani; Shabad	Gyani Balwinder Singh, Gyani Kuljeet Singh	1:29
3.	"Sir Dijae Kaan Na Kijae"	Traditional Gurbani Shabad	Gyani Balwinder Singh, Gyani Kuljeet Singh, Bibi Amrit Kaur	1:22
Total length:				9:20

== Release ==
In 2023, the film was scheduled to have its world premiere at the Toronto International Film Festival (TIFF) but was removed from the line-up at the last moment.

In 2025, Trehan held private screenings of the film, then titled Punjab '95, including at the 2025 Cannes Film Festival and in Bengaluru.

The makers alleged that later on they were being prevented from holding private screenings too.

“Around three months back, I was called by the people in power to stop the [private] screening,” Trehan said to the New Lines Magazine. He further added, “They also put pressure on those with private studios to not play ‘Panjab ’95.’”

Finally after multiple delays, the film's uncut version under a new title Satluj was released digitally on ZEE5 on 3 July 2026. However, two days after the release, the film was pulled from ZEE5 India until further notice. On 11 July 2026, the film was also removed from ZEE5 international.

A day after the release of the film, Dosanjh had already anticipated that the film might get taken down from ZEE5. Answering a question whether Satluj would get taken down from ZEE5 from a fan during an Instagram live session, he had said:

“It can happen. There’s that fear. Today is Saturday. It could be pulled down by Monday. But let’s worry not. You can download the film till now. Those who want to stop the film can do that. Those who want to take panga can do that. There’s no tension.”

In an interview with The Free Press Journal, Kanwaljit Singh, who portrayed the character of DGP Inderpal Singh Bitta in Satluj, criticised the taking down of the film from ZEE5 as a violation of free speech, saying:

"I spoke to Honey after the film was taken down, and he said they shall be taking the matter to court. But what I don't understand is why they had to take it off. Even people who weren't going to watch it will want to watch it now. It has also been downloaded by so many people, so even though lots of people will be watching it, the producers will lose out. But I want to ask, what is this freedom of speech? Tell me, I really want to know. That right is being strangled."

== Reception ==
=== Critical response ===
On the review aggregator website Rotten Tomatoes, 100% of 12 critics' reviews are positive, with an average rating of 7.5/10.

Saibal Chatterjee of NDTV gave 4 stars out of 5 and said that "Satluj is a powerful political film that pulls no punches, It is unmissable. Its title may have changed, its power hasn't diminished one bit". Shubhra Gupta writing for The Indian Express rated it 3.5 stars out of 5 and writes that "But there's nothing generic about the film. It is a powerful, moving account of a lone man holding up a candle to dispel darkness. Take a bow, Honey Trehan, and Team Satluj; this is a clear win for filmmakers who want to tell the story of an actual person, time and place, with unwavering conviction." Reviewing the film for Scroll.in, Nandini Ramnath called it a harrowing and heart-rending account of unchecked state power, praising Dosanjh's understated performance and the ensemble cast, including Ohlyan, Vicky and Rampal. She wrote that the film's insistence on Khalra's religious motivations understates the leftist political tradition the real Khalra came from, and that its 163-minute runtime includes some indulgent stretches, but called it one of the sharpest political films in recent memory. Debanjan Dhar of Outlook rated the film 4/5 stars and called it one of the year's most essential films and praised Dosanjh and Vicky's performances, describing the latter's character as a chilling study in institutional cruelty. Writing in India TV News, the critic praised the muted cinematography and restrained score but found the editing loose in places, arguing that trimming around fifteen minutes would have tightened the film, and gave it 3.5/5 stars.

Giving the film 3/5 stars, Troy Ribeiro of Free Press Journal called it a sincere and necessary work with a clear moral spine, praising Dosanjh's understated lead performance and Rampal and Singh's supporting turns, and noted that the film favours atmosphere over spectacle. Neeshita Nyayapati reviewing for Hindustan Times gave 4 stars out of 5 and said that "Satluj might seem like the story of just one person, one region, and the horrific acts that occurred during a single period. But beneath the tension-filled and heartbreaking tale lies the answer to whether one person could ever bring about social change. More than just a sharp political film, Satluj is a reminder that a lamp can vanquish darkness, a relevant message for today's world." Anuj Kumar of The Hindu writes in his review that "Dosanjh shines as a solitary lamp whose conviction outlasts the darkest night in this moving tribute to social activist Jaswant Singh Khalra, where director Honey Trehan examines the rhetoric around the dehumanisation of citizens." Devesh Sharma of Filmfare rated it 4/5 stars and said that "Satluj is not conventional entertainment, nor does it aspire to be. It is a film that educates, disturbs and moves in equal measure. It honours the memory of a man who chose truth over safety and conscience over silence. At a time when meaningful cinema often struggles to find space, films like this become all the more valuable." Agnivo Niyogi of The Telegraph (India) appreciated the performances of Dosanjh and the supporting cast (Ohlyan, Sachdeva, Vicky, Singh and Rampal), cinematography, editing and filmmaking. For the latter, he wrote, "Trehan refuses to reduce systemic abuse to isolated incidents or a handful of villains. Instead, he patiently shows how institutions can normalise extraordinary violence when accountability disappears."

British academic, writer and human rights advocate William Gomes published two critical essays on Satluj in ModernGhana. He argued that the film subjects Khalra to a symbolic “second killing” by depicting his death while omitting important aspects of his Sikh political identity, including his association with the Khalistan movement. Gomes also criticised the film for replacing allegations of a state-funded police bounty system and senior official responsibility with a narrative centred on individual corruption and extortion.

== Impact ==
Owing to the takedown of Satluj from ZEE5 for Indian viewers, multiple pirated copies began circulating over platforms like WhatsApp, Telegram, X (formerly known as Twitter) and YouTube.

Community screenings of Satluj were organised by the Sikh organisations, local activists and residents across India, particularly at community spaces like the gurudwaras, using the copies circulating online, leading to, as Forbes contributor, Hannah Abraham, called, the Streisand effect.

A public interest litigation (PIL) was filed in Punjab and Haryana High Court on 9 July 2026, seeking the restoration of Satluj on ZEE5, questioning the abrupt removal of the film from the OTT platform and raising concerns over free speech and due process.

“The abrupt removal of the film, without disclosure of any statutory order, judicial direction or lawful authority, has not only curtailed the fundamental right of the public to receive information and artistic expression under Article 19 (1) (a) of the Constitution of India but has also deprived thousands of bona-fide subscribers of access to content for which they had already paid consideration,” the petition stated.

On 10 July 2026, 50 journalists and film critics signed a joint statement addressed to Mr Ashwini Vaishnaw, India's incumbent Union Minister of Information and Broadcasting (I&B), condemning the removal of Satluj from ZEE5, calling it an 'executive overreach' and a 'continuing erosion of due process.'

== See also ==
- Punjab 1984
- Jogi
