= Anhe Ghore Da Daan =

- Film poster
- Directed by: Gurvinder Singh
- Written by: Gurdial Singh
- Based on: Anhe Ghore Da Daan by Gurdial Singh
- Produced by: National Film Development Corporation of India
- Starring: Samuel John; Kul Sidhu; Gurpreet Bhangu
- Cinematography: Satya Rai Nagpaul
- Edited by: Ujjwal Chandra
- Music by: Catherine Lamb
- Release date: 11 October 2011 (Busan International Film Festival)
- Country: India
- Language: Punjabi

Anhe Ghore Da Daan (Eng: Alms in the Name of a Blind Horse) is a 2011 Indian Punjabi-language film directed by Gurvinder Singh, based on the 1976 novel of the same name by Gurdial Singh. It portrays the plight and problems of Dalit farmers in Punjab and their conflict with the upper caste landlords. The film won National Awards for Best Direction, Cinematography and Best Feature Film in Punjabi at the 59th National Film Awards of India.

The film was shot in and around Bathinda in February and March 2011. The first part of Singh's Punjab Trilogy, it is followed by The Fourth Direction (2015) and Crescent Night (2022).

== Plot ==
Both the novel and the movie derive their title from an ancient myth associated with the churning of the ocean, in which Vishnu had been less than fair in his dispensation to the Asuras, supposedly the progenitors of latter-day Dalits.

The film is set in a village on the outskirts Bathinda city, where the Dalit villagers work in the fields of the local landlord. It is a village where Dalit people are trying hard to make peace with their existence. Daily rituals betray their simmering anger and their helplessness. The landlord has sold his plots to an industry that has demolished the house of one of the villagers who refuses to vacate it. The elderly farmer's son is a rickshaw puller in the nearby town. The rickshaw pullers have gone on a strike that has turned violent. Both father and son are equally clueless about their futures.

== Cast ==
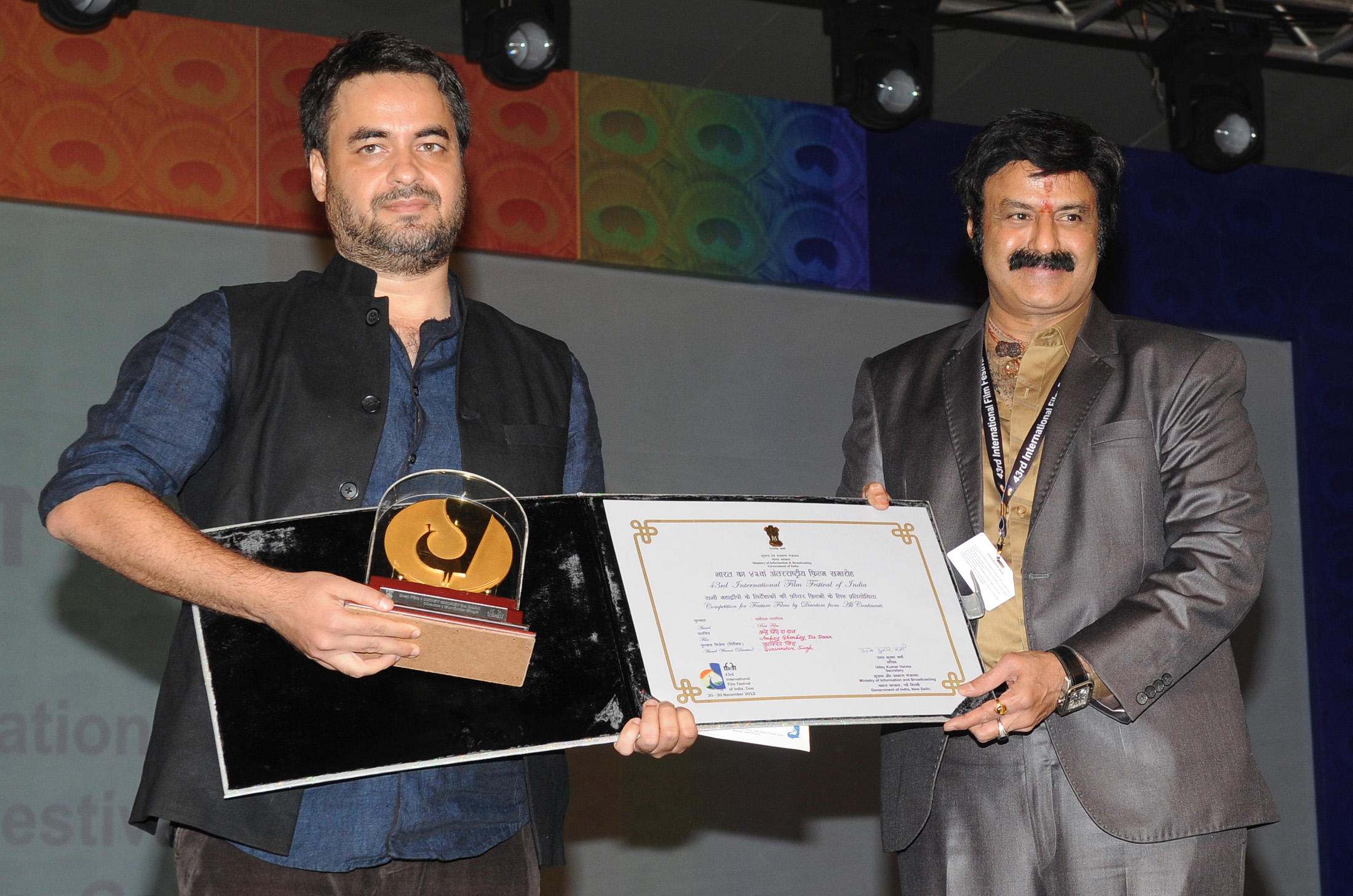
The Chief Guest, Actor Shri Nandamuri Balkrishna presenting the Golden Peacock award to Gurvinder Singh for this film.

- Samuel John as Melu, the rickshaw puller
- Mal Singh as Father
- Sarbjeet Kaur as Dayalo
- Emmanuel Singh as Bhupi
- Kulvinder Kaur as Ballo, Melu's wife
- Lakha Singh as Lakha
- Gurvinder Makhna as Dulla
- Dharminder Kaur as Mother

== Awards ==
Anhe Ghore Da Daan is the first Punjabi-language film to have traveled to numerous international film festivals. The film premiered in the Orizzonti section (Horizons) at the 68th Venice International Film Festival. It won the Special Jury Award and the $50,000 Black Pearl trophy at the Abu Dhabi Film Festival. It was also shown at the 55th BFI London Film Festival, 49th New York Film Festival and the 16th Busan International Film Festival. The film won the National Awards for Best Direction and Cinematography (for cinematographer Satya Raj Nagpaul) at the 59th National Film Awards of India. In the regional category (Punjabi language), it was given another award for Best Punjabi Feature Film at the 59th National Film Awards. This film has also won the Golden Peacock (Best Film) at the 42nd International Film Festival of India.
