= Jaitu =

City in Punjab, India

Jaitu Jaito, Gangsar Jaito
- City
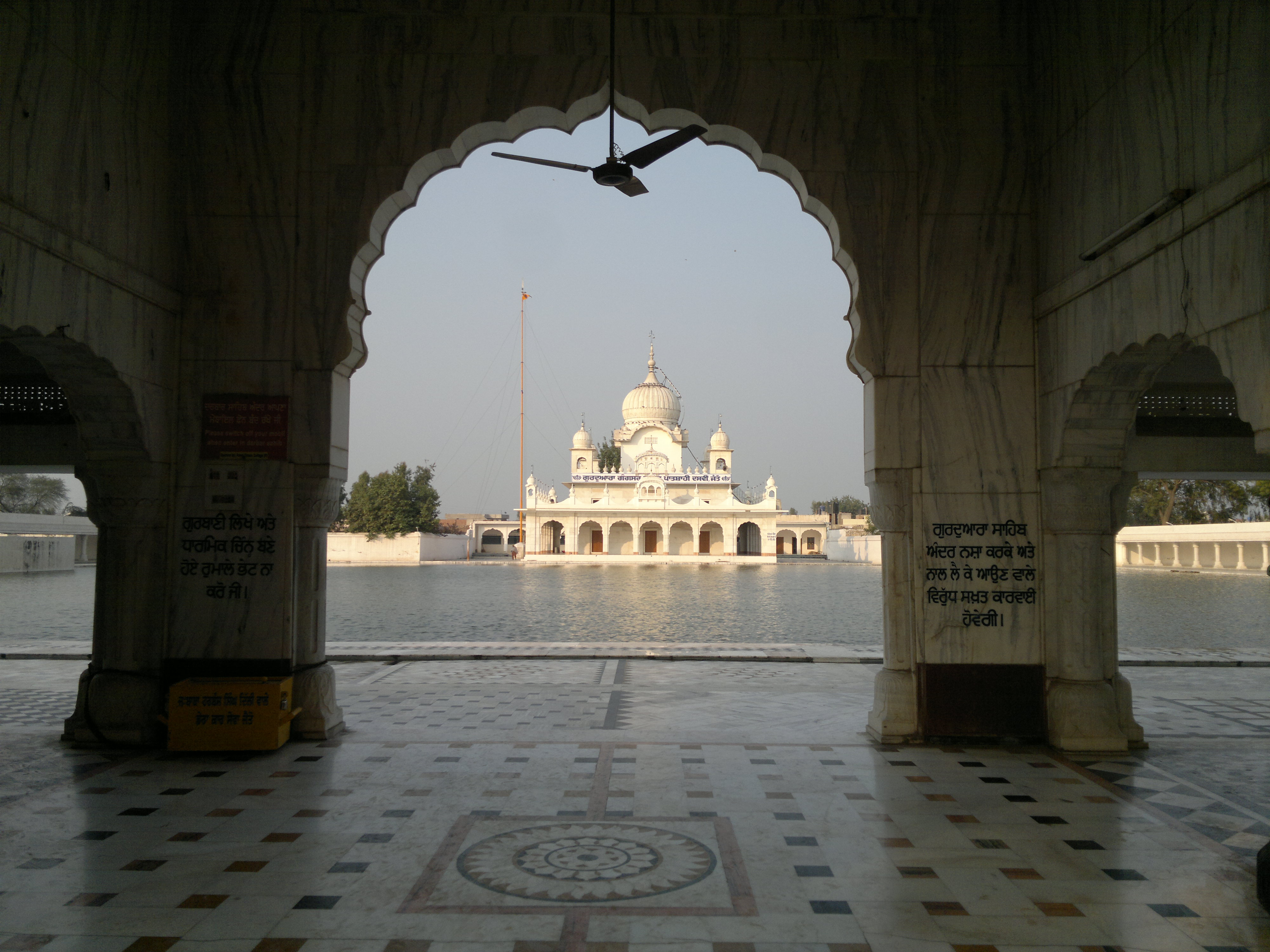

- Location in Punjab, India
- Coordinates: 30.450893°N 74.882898°E
- Country: India
- State: Punjab
- District: Faridkot
- Founder: Baba Jaitu

Government
  - Type: State Government
  - Body: Congress Party

Area
  - Total: 13.09 km^{2} (5.05 sq mi)

Population (2011)
  - Total: 37,377
  - Density: 2,855/km^{2} (7,395/sq mi)

Languages
  - Official: Punjabi
- Time zone: UTC+5:30 (IST)
- PIN: 151202
- Telephone code: 01635
- Vehicle registration: PB 62

Jaitu (sometimes written as Jaito, also known as Gangsar Jaitu) is a historical city. Jaitu is a municipal council in Faridkot district in the Indian state of Punjab. It is subdivision in Ferozepur Division. It is 30 km (19 mi) from Bathinda, 130 km (81 mi) from Ludhiana, 150 km (93 mi)from Amritsar, 180 km (110 mi) from Patiala and 234 km (145 mi) from Chandigarh.

== Etymology ==
According to some accounts, it took its name "Gangsar" from a folk story in which Guru Gobind Singh Ji visited the town and was sitting on a sand dune when he saw a saint crying. He asked the saint why he was crying to which the saint replied that he was crying because he lost his bowl in the Ganges river. After hearing his misfortune, the Guru fired off an arrow which struck the ground and opened a water source there fetching water and his lost bowl from the Ganges river. Later Gurdwara Tibbi Sahib Ji and Gurdwara Gangsar Sahib Ji were constructed on both the sites, on the sand dune where the Guru was sitting and where lake was opened.

According to some accounts, it was a small village founded by Baba Jaitu and took its name "Jaitu" from him.

== Demographics ==
As of the 2001 India census, Jaitu had a population of 33,465. Males constitute 53% of the population and females 47%. Jaitu has an average literacy rate of 62%, lesser than the national average of 74%: male literacy is 67%, and female literacy is 56%. In Jaitu, 13% of the population is under 6 years of age.

== Geography ==
Jaitu is in the northwestern region of India and is a part of the Indo-Gangetic alluvial plains which in a macro regional context forms a part of great Satluj Ganga plain. The exact cartographic co-ordinates of Jaitu are 30.450893°N 74.882898°E. It has an average elevation of 201 metres (659 ft). The surrounding districts are Muktsar, Bathinda, Ferozepur and Moga. The boundaries of the states of Haryana & Rajasthan are under an hour's drive from Jaitu.

It is a low-lying flat area. The surface of the district is depositional plain which was formed by alleviation by the rivers in the remote past. No river is flowing through the district, but there are some drains which flow during heavy rains and serve as natural drainage. There is a vast network of canals i.e. Bikaner, Sirhind feeder and Rajasthan Canal passes through Faridkot district. Sirhind feeder, Rajasthan Canal and Abohar Branch of Sirhind canal run through the entire length of Faridkot district in north–south and northeast–southwest directions respectively. Sirhind Canal system has been serving the district for irrigation since long times.

== Climate ==
Jaitu

Climate chart (precipitation, max. and min. temperature)
J	F	M	A	M	J	J	A	S	O	N	D
0 14 5	27 19 6	51 19 9	0 24 9	0 27 22	12 24 22	78 24 21	51 25 18	72 30 21	0 27 17	5 20 13	15 18 8
- █ Average max. and min. temperatures in °C
- █ Precipitation totals in mm
- Source: World Weather Online
Imperial conversion
J	F	M	A	M	J	J	A	S	O	N	D
0 57 41	1.1 66 43	2 66 48	0 75 48	0 81 72	0.5 75 72	3.1 75 70	2 77 64	2.8 86 70	0 81 63	0.2 68 55	0.6 64 46
- █ Average max. and min. temperatures in °F
- █ Precipitation totals in inches

Jaitu's climate correspond to semi arid with high variation between summer and winter temperatures. Average annual rainfall is in a range of 20 to 40 mm (0.79 to 1.57 in). Summer temperatures can be as high as 45 °C (113 °F); and winter temperatures as low as 5 °C (41 °F). The weather is generally dry but will be highly humid from mid May to end of August due to farmers irrigating the fields. There is no meteorological observatory in the district. Some rainfall occurs during the pre-monsoon months, mostly in the form of thunder-showers and in the cold season. The skies are mostly clear or lightly clouded during the whole year. Winds are generally light in the area, and are northerly to north-westerly, at times south-easterly, throughout the year. But, during the summer and monsoon seasons winds from directions between north-east and south-east blow on many days. The climate is mainly dry, characterized by a very hot summer, a short rainy season and a bracing winter. The year may be divided into four seasons.

Summer (April to mid-July): The Temperatures increase rapidly beginning with the end of March till June. This is followed by the summer season which lasts up to about mid of July. June is generally the hottest month, with the mean daily minimum temperature about 41 degree Celsius and the mean daily minimum about 26.5 degree Celsius. It is intensely hot during the summer, and the dust laden winds which blow, especially in the sandy parts, are very trying. The maximum temperature may go beyond 47 degree Celsius on individual days. Occasional thunderstorms and more frequently dust storms occur during the hot season.

Rainy (mid-July to mid-September): Rainfall is primarily from the south-west, due to the monsoon, and lasts from mid-July to mid-September. The period from July to the middle of September constitutes the south-west monsoon season. With the onset of the monsoon by about the end of June or early July, there is an appreciable drop in the day temperature. However, during breaks in the monsoon during latter part of July and in August the weather becomes oppressive due to increase in day temperatures. The average annual rainfall in the district is 433 mm (17.0 in). about 71 percent of the annual rainfall in the district is received during the monsoon months July to September, July/August being the rainiest months. Rain during the monsoon season is also sometimes accompanied with thunder. Skies are moderately clouded during the monsoon season.

Post-Monsoon (mid-September to October): The later half of September and October is the post-monsoon or transition period. By about the second week of September, when the monsoon withdraws from the area, both day and night temperatures begin to decrease. The fall in the night temperatures even in October is much more than that in the day temperatures.

Winter (November to March): The cold season is from November to March. After October both the day and night temperatures decrease rapidly till January which is the coldest month. The mean daily maximum temperatures in January is about 20 degree Celsius and the mean daily minimum about 4.5 degree Celsius. In the cold season the district is affected by cold waves in the wake of passing western disturbances and the minimum temperature occasionally drops down to about a degree or two below the freezing point of water. Fog occurs occasionally in the cold season. Occasional thunderstorms occur during the cold season. Skies are moderately clouded for short spells of a day or two during cold season in association with the passing western disturbances.

Climate data for Jaitu
Month	Jan	Feb	Mar	Apr	May	Jun	Jul	Aug	Sep	Oct	Nov	Dec	Year
Mean daily maximum °C (°F)	14 (57)	19 (66)	19 (66)	24 (75)	27 (81)	24 (75)	24 (75)	25 (77)	30 (86)	27 (81)	20 (68)	18 (64)	23 (73)
Mean daily minimum °C (°F)	5 (41)	6 (43)	6 (43)	9 (48)	22 (72)	22 (72)	21 (70)	18 (64)	21 (70)	17 (63)	13 (55)	8 (46)	14 (57)
Average rainfall mm (inches)	0 (0)	27 (1.1)	51 (2.0)	0 (0)	0 (0)	12 (0.5)	78 (3.1)	51 (2.0)	72 (2.8)	0 (0)	5 (0.2)	5 (0.2)	301 (11.9)
Average rainy days	3	7	12	4	0	5	13	6	5	2	2	5	64
Source: World Weather Online

== Economy ==
Jaitu's main economy is agriculture. It is known for its mandis which is the local word for market, they are famous for wheat and paddy trade. There are different processing industrial units. There are around 30 rice mills and 3 cotton factories. There are some timber saw mills also.

== Environment and health ==
A South African Board Certified Candidate Clinical Metal Toxicologist, Carin Smit, visiting Faridkot city in Punjab, India, instrumental in having hair and urine samples taken (2008/9) of 149/53 children respectively, who affected with birth abnormalities including physical deformities, neurological and mental disorders. These samples were shipped to Microtrace Mineral Lab, Germany.

At the onset of the action research project, it was expected that heavy metal / chemistry toxicity might be implicated as reasons why these children were so badly affected. Surprisingly, high levels of uranium were found in 88% of the samples, and in the case of one child, the levels were more than 60 times the maximum safe limit.

A study, carried out amongst intellectually disabled children in the Malwa region of Punjab, revealed 87% of children below 12 years and 82% beyond that age having uranium levels high enough to cause diseases, also uranium levels in samples of three kids from Kotkapura and Faridkot were 62, 44 and 27 times higher than normal.

An investigation carried out The Observer newspaper, in 2009, revealed the possible that cause of contamination of soil and ground water in Malwa region of Punjab, to be the fly ash from coal burnt at thermal power plants, which contains high levels of uranium and ash as the region has state's two biggest coal-fired power stations.

Unscientific farming practices, that emerged after the introduction of Green Revolution, are also alleged to be a reason for growing incidence of not just cancer but also, high rates of spontaneous abortions, reproductive ailments, genetic deformities, anaemia, diarrhoea, vomiting, fluorosis and a host of skin ailments including rashes and boils.

A 2007 epidemiological study found that the surface waters of Malwa region are contaminated with arsenic, cadmium, chromium, selenium and mercury primarily due to the discharge of untreated waste water from surrounding industries. With increasing poisoning of the soil, the region once hailed as the home to the Green revolution, now due to excessive use of chemical fertilizer, is being termed the "Other Bhopal", and "even credit-takers of the Revolution have begun to admit they had been wrong, now that they see wastelands and lives lost to farmer suicides in this 'granary of India'".

Also in May 2004, at least seven persons in Jaitu, were reported to have died of gastroenteritis in the state. The numerous water samples collected from various districts had testified that people in many parts of the state have been drinking water unfit for human consumption, which is officially stated to be a major cause of gastroenteritis in Punjab. At places, the drinking water supplied by the municipal authorities had been found to be contaminated.

== Famous personalities ==
- Seth Ram Nath – born on 10 January 1916, at Jaitu, and was among those who did not trade their principles for personal gain. As a child, he was a witness to the famous Jaitu March in 1923. He had his early education at Jaitu, Faridkot and Moga. He was detained for two years in Nabha Central Jail for participating in the Quit India Movement in 1942. Known as a freedom fighter, he was also the inspiration behind the setting up of a high school for Harijans. A civil hospital In Jaitu called "Seth Ram Nath Civil Hospital" is also named after him.
- Om Prkash Garg HE – was the Sub Divisional Magistrate (head official of a country's subdivision, responsible for maintenance of law) in 1973 of FARIDKOT. He had his early education at patiala. He was a freedom fighter for the country.
- Arshdeep singh Dhillon (Gulwant Singh) – a cyclist, he traveled 2000 km on a cycle from Punjab to Karnataka and he is a social activist, he raised his voice on social media against fake journalists and forced them to publish true news.
- Gurdial Singh Rahi – he is a famous novelist and was awarded President award from K R Narayanan. A street in Jaitu name Gianpeeth Maarg is also named after his name.
- Deepak Jaitoi – he was a famous Punjabi Ghazal-writer as well as songwriter. When he entered the world of writing, Ghazal writing in Punjabi was considered impossible. He accepted Punjabi Ghazal writing as a challenge and published many books. He worked for Punjabi for about six decades of his life. His poems were used in various Punjabi songs with one of his poem being used recently by Satinder Sartaaj in one of his song.
- Dharamvir Singh Bhatia – he was born in Shujabad and after partition his family settled in Jaitu. He was a famous Ayurvedic physician, educationist, social worker & a very good politician. He was the man of principles. He was a very charming spiritual personality in the town. He was assassinated by terrorists on 23 December 1990 during Punjab insurgency.
- Beant Singh (assassin) – bodyguard to Indira Gandhi, and was one of two who took part in assassination of Indira Gandhi.

== Transport ==
The Punjab Roadways (Punbus) and PRTC and other Private Companies buses connects this city to other major cities of Punjab like Amritsar, Chandigarh, Ludhiana, Jallandhar, Patiala, Bathinda among others.

Jaitu Railway Station lies in the Northern Railway zone of the Indian Railways network. Scheduled trains connect Jaitu to Delhi, Mumbai, Bathinda, Jammu, Jaipur, Ferozpur and Faridkot among other cities.

Bathinda Airport is the nearest domestic airport (around 35 kilometers) to catch flights to various major cities of India.

== Education ==
The city has a number of both English medium and Vernacular medium schools. The city also has one girls college for graduation in Arts and Humanities and one Gov’t Co-Education College for graduation. The institutes are:

- Punjabi University College
- The Global-e-School
- Saraswati Kanya Maha Vidyalya College (Girls)
- Punjabi University Regional & Neighbourhood Campus
- Govt. ITI College
- Govt. Sen. Sec. School (Boys)
- Govt. Sen. Sec. School (Girls)
- Govt. Primary Schools
- Saraswati Sen. Sec. School
- D.A.V. Sen. Sec. School
- Shivalik Public Sen. Sec. School
- Shivalik Kids School
- Guru Gobind Singh Ji Public School
- Guru Teg Bahadur Public School
- Amar Murti Tagore School
- Alliance International School
- Baba Farid Public School
- Saravhitkari Public School
- Punjab Public School
- Silver Oaks School
