= Deepak Jaitoi =

Baba-E-Ghazal Deepak Jaitoi
- Born: Gurcharan Singh; 26 April 1919; Jaitu, Punjab, India
- Died: 12 February 2005 (aged 85)
- Occupations: Ghazal-writer, Songwriter
- Known for: Punjabi Ghazals

Deepak Jaitoi, also spelled as Deepak Jatoi, was a British-Indian Punjabi-language Ghazal-writer as well as songwriter. He worked for Punjabi for about six decades of his life.

== Early life ==
Jaitoi was born as Gurcharan Singh on 26 April 1919, to father S. Inder Singh and mother Veer Kaur, in the village of Jaitu in the Punjab Province of British India (now in Faridkot district). His father was also a poet. He started writing poetry in early age then became a disciple of Harbans Lal Mujrim Dasuhi and learn Ghazal writing from him.

== Work ==
When he entered the world of writing, Ghazal writing in Punjabi was considered impossible. He accepted Punjabi Ghazal writing as a challenge and published many books. He also wrote songs in Punjabi. His songs, aah lai maae saambh kunjian, dhian kar challian sardari and jutti laggdi haania mere, ve putt na pulanghan lammian, recorded by singer Narinder Biba got very popular.

== Selected publications ==
- G̲h̲azala dī adā: g̲h̲azalāṃ
- Dīpaka dī loa: g̲h̲azala saṅgrahi
- Coṇawīāṃ ghazalāṃ
