= Kanwaljeet Singh (activist) =

Indian activist and author

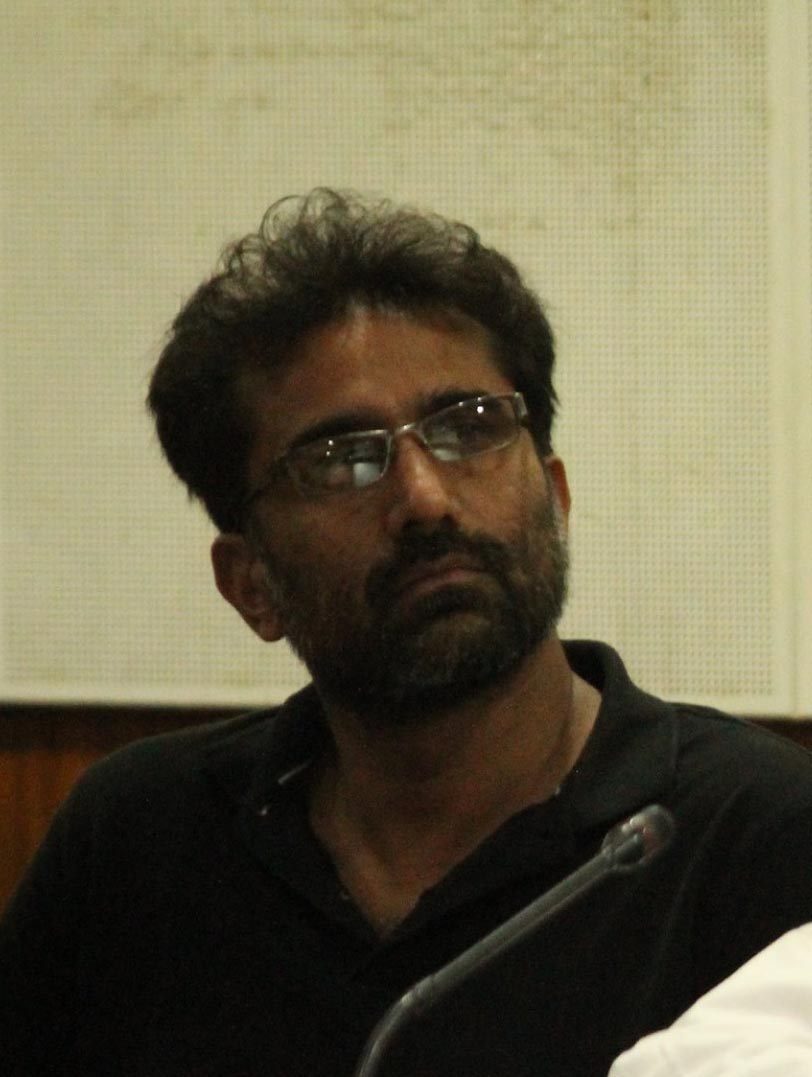
- In a seminar at Guru Kashi University, Talwandi Sabo
- Born: Patiala
- Education: CSIR-CSIO, Punjab University
- Occupations: Social Activist, Author, Robotics Engineer
- Years active: 1996 – present
- Organization(s): Communist Party of India (Marxist–Leninist) Liberation, All India Central Council of Trade Unions, Revolutionary Youth Association

Kanwaljeet Singh is an activist, author working in various social and political organisations. He is currently a member of the central committee of Communist Party of India (Marxist–Leninist) Liberation, the state president of the Chandigarh Unit of All India Central Council of Trade Unions. He has worked as state president of the Punjab unit of Revolutionary Youth Association. He graduated as engineer in Mechatronics and Industrial Automation from Indo Swiss, Central Scientific Instruments Organisation Chandigarh. He also holds a Master of Art in Philosophy degree from Panjab University. He briefly worked as an Engineer in GE Healthcare and NCR Corporation. In 2005, he left his job to join a social movement for justice for Bant Singh. As an author he has published articles on op-ed pages of Punjabi Tribune and Nawan Zamana. In his early days into activism he was a theatre activist performing street and stage plays. He acted in a film The Fourth Direction as Jugal one of the main protagonist.
