= Meel Patthar =

- Directed by: Ivan Ayr
- Written by: Ivan Ayr; Neel Mani Kant
- Produced by: Kimsi Singh
- Starring: Suvinder Vicky; Lakshvir Saran
- Cinematography: Angello Faccini
- Edited by: Ivan Ayr
- Music by: Gautam Nair
- Production company: Jabberwockee Talkies
- Distributed by: Netflix
- Release date: 3 September 2020 (Venice)
- Running time: 98 minutes
- Country: India
- Languages: Hindi; Punjabi

Meel Patthar (transl. Milestone) is a 2020 Indian Hindi-language drama film co-written, edited and directed by Ivan Ayr and produced by Kimsi Singh. Starring Suvinder Vicky and Lakshvir Saran in major roles, the story follows a truck driver who tries to cope with the tragic death of his wife. The film premiered in the Orizzonti (Horizons) section of the 77th Venice International Film Festival on 3 September 2020. It was also screened at the 25th Busan International Film Festival and the Pingyao International Film Festival. Meel Patthar won the Best Film award while Vicky was given the Best Performer Award in the Asian feature film category at the Singapore International Film Festival. Netflix acquired the distribution rights of the film and it was released worldwide on the platform on 7 May 2021.

== Cast ==
- Suvinder Vicky as Ghalib
- Lakshvir Saran as Pash
- Akhilesh dwivedi as mr. Gil Son

== Production ==
The film is partially in Punjabi language as the protagonist is Punjabi who is working in the New Delhi region. It was shot in January and February in 2020. Ayr said that the film "tells you where you are and how much further you have to go." Further explaining: "Like how we say there is a significant moment or milestone one has crossed, that is there in the film. He gets to a certain milestone which he is unaware of and certain things begin to happen which makes things uncertain." After the nationwide lockdown was imposed, Ayr got the film edited and sound-mixed from a remote location. The film was shot in a village in Haryana. To get into how truck drivers operate, Ayr spent time with several one of them for the research in Delhi and Chandigarh. Both the actors took truck driving lessons for their role.

== Reception ==
Meel Patthar received mostly positive response from critics. On the review aggregator website Rotten Tomatoes, 82% of 11 critics' reviews are positive, with an average rating of 6.6/10.

Namrata Joshi noted that the film "offers a brooding look at lives constantly on the move, yet always paused." Saibal Chatterjee of NDTV wrote: "This sublimely multi-layered film embraces the personal struggles of its characters with as much passion as it portrays the manifestations of the social inequities that are an intrinsic part of their existence." Stutee Ghosh of The Quint said, "A cinematic milestone, Ivan Ayr's Meel Patthar is a moving portrait of a man lacerated by the truth of life." Baradwaj Rangan praised the film and wrote: "This moving tale of a trucker paints a portrait of an ecosystem where everything and everyone appears to be a metaphor for disuse, neglect, ageing." Shubhra Gupta of The Indian Express called the film "a poignant, lyrical look at the life of a truck driver."
