= Pattar Kalan =

Pattar Kalan is a village in Jalandhar district, Punjab, India situated on Kapurthala to Kartarpur road. Its pincode is 144806.

== Notable people ==
- Surjit Patar, a Punjabi writer and poet
