= Gurdial Singh =

Indian writer

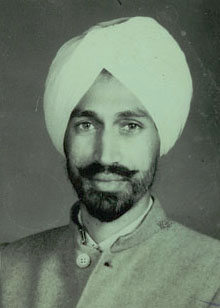
- Gurdial Singh in early 1960s
- Born: 10 January 1933; Jaitu, Punjab Province, British India
- Died: 16 August 2016 (aged 83); Bathinda, Punjab, India
- Occupations: Writer; novelist; Coach
- Known for: Marhi Da Deeva (1964)

Gurdial Singh Rahi (Gurdi'āl Sigh; 10 January 1933 – 16 August 2016) was an Indian writer and novelist who wrote in Punjabi. He started his literary career in 1957 with a short story, "Bhaganwale." He became known as a novelist when he published the novel Marhi Da Deeva in 1964. The novel was later adapted into the Punjabi film Marhi Da Deeva in 1989, directed by Surinder Singh. His novel Anhe Ghore Da Daan was also made into a film of the same name in 2011 by director Gurvinder Singh. Singh was honoured with the Padma Shri in 1998 and Jnanpith Award in 1999.

== Life and work ==
=== Early life ===
Gurdial Singh was born on 10 January 1933 in the village of Bhaini Fateh near Jaitu in British Punjab. His father, Jagat Singh, was a carpenter, and his mother, Nihal Kaur, took care of the household. The young Singh began working as a carpenter at the age of 12 to support his family's poor financial conditions. By his own admission, Singh worked 16 hours a day when he took on various jobs such as making wheels for bullock carts and metal sheet forming for water tanks. Together, he and his father earned ₹20 (21¢ US) a day from hard labour.

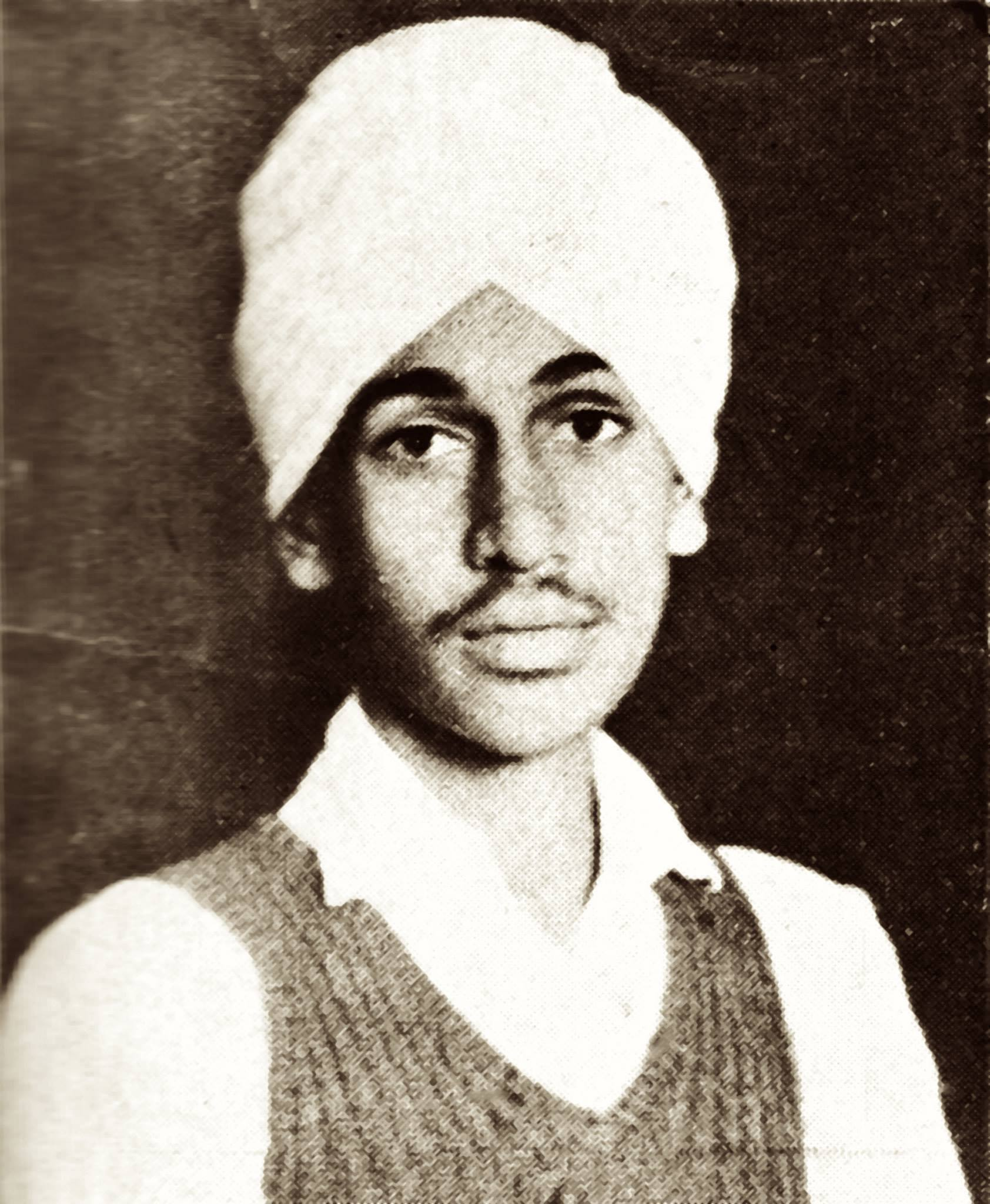
Punjabi writer Gurdial Singh in 1947

In childhood, Singh was interested in painting but gradually he applied himself to a formal education. After successfully persuading Singh's father that his son was worthy of more schooling, Madan Mohan Sharma, the headmaster of a middle school that Singh attended in Jaito, encouraged the young boy to stick with his studies, even though his father thought it was futile. Singh completed his Matric examination while he worked in various day time jobs. At the age of 14, he married Balwant Kaur. In 1962, he took the job of school teacher in Nandpur Kotra which paid him ₹60 (62¢ US) in monthly salary. Meanwhile, Singh continued his own education, went on to receive his B.A. in English and History, and followed that up with a M.A. in 1967.

=== Literary career ===
Singh started his literary career in 1957 with a short story, "Bhaganwale", which was published in Panj Darya, a magazine edited by Mohan Singh. His later stories were published in Preetlari, edited by Gurbaksh Singh. His major work, Marhi Da Deeva, established his reputation as a novelist. Singh wrote four different versions of the novel over the course of four years, before he decided to publish the fourth and final one in 1964. The various characters Singh portrayed in the novel were recreations of real-life people woven into a fictitious storyline. It was translated into English by Ajmer Rode as The Last Flicker. The first edition of the translation was published in 1991 by the Sahitya Akademi. A revised edition of The Last Flicker appeared in 2010, published by the National Book Trust.

Singh's other notable works included the novels Anhoe (1966), Addh Chanani Raat (1972), Anhe Ghore Da Daan (1976) and Parsa (1991); collections of short stories, including Saggi Phull (1962), Kutta Te Aadmi (1971), Begana Pind (1985) and Kareer Di Dhingri (1991); and autobiographies Neean Mattiyan (1999) and Dojee Dehi (2000) published in two parts. The novels Addh Chanani Raat and Parsa have been translated into English as Night of the Half Moon (published by Macmillan) and Parsa by the National Book Trust, respectively.

Singh's favourite works included Leo Tolstoy's Anna Karenina, Irving Stone's Lust for Life, John Steinbeck's The Grapes Of Wrath, Phanishwar Nath Renu's Maila Anchal, Prem Chand's Godaan and Yashpal's Divya.

=== Awards and honours ===
Singh received various awards over the course of his life, including the Sahitya Akademi Award in Punjabi in 1975 for the novel Adh Chanani Raat, the Soviet Land Nehru Award in 1986, the Bhai Veer Singh Fiction Award in 1992, the Shiromani Sahitkar Award in 1992, the Jnanpith Award in 1999 and the Padma Shri in 1998. He shared the Jnanpith Award with Hindi language author Nirmal Verma.

=== Death ===
Singh suffered from a heart attack earlier in 2016 after which he was partially paralysed. On 13 August 2016 he fell unconscious at his home in Jaitu and was admitted into a private hospital at Bathinda where he was kept on ventilator support. He died on 16 August 2016, when he was taken off life support systems, after it was determined that Singh had shown no signs of recovery. He is survived by his wife, Balwant Kaur, a son and two daughters.

== Works ==
Singh has published various novels, short story collections, plays, children's literature and also an autobiography in two parts.

Literary works of Gurdial Singh
Year	Title	Genre	Notes
1960	Bakalam Khud	Children's literature	
1962	Saggi Phull	Short stories	
1963	Tuk Kho Laye Kawan	Children's literature	
1964	Chan Da Boota	Short stories	
1964	Marhi Da Deeva	Novel	English translation: The Last Flicker; Adapted as film Marhi Da Deeva (1989)
1966	Upra Ghar	Short stories	
1966	Anhoe	Novel	Adapted as the television show Anhoyee by DD Punjabi.
1967	Rete Di Ikk Mutthi	Novel	
1968	Kuwela	Novel	
1971	Kutta Te Aadmi	Short stories	
1971	Likhtam Baba Khema	Children's literature	
1972	Adh Chanini Raat	Novel	English translation: Night of the Half-Moon (1996)
1974	Aathan Uggan	Novel	
1976	Anhe Ghore Da Daan	Novel	Adapted as film Anhe Ghore Da Daan (2011)
1982	Pauh Phutale Ton Pehlan	Novel	
1982	Masti Bota	Short stories	
1982	Farida, Ratin Wadian	Play	
1982	Vidayagi De Pichhon	Play	
1982	Nikki Moti Gal	Play	
1984	Rukhe Misse Bande	Short stories	
1985	Begana Pindh	Short stories	
1988	Chonvian Kahanian	Short stories	
1988	Baba Khema	Children's literature	
1989	Gappian Da Pio	Children's literature	
1990	Pakka Tikana	Short stories	
1990	Mahabharat	Children's literature	
1991	Kareer Di Dhingri	Short stories	
1992	Meri Pratinidhi Rachna	Short stories	
1993	Tin Kadam Dharti	Children's literature	
1993	Khate Mithe Lok	Children's literature	
1999	Parsa	Novel	English translation: Parsa (1999)
1999	Neean Mattiyan	Autobiography	Part 1
2000	Dojee Dehi	Autobiography	Part 2

Sapno Ke - Se Din was one of his works, talking about his childhood days and is included in CBSE class 10 Hindi course B.
