= Waryam Singh Sandhu =

Indian author of short stories (born 1945)

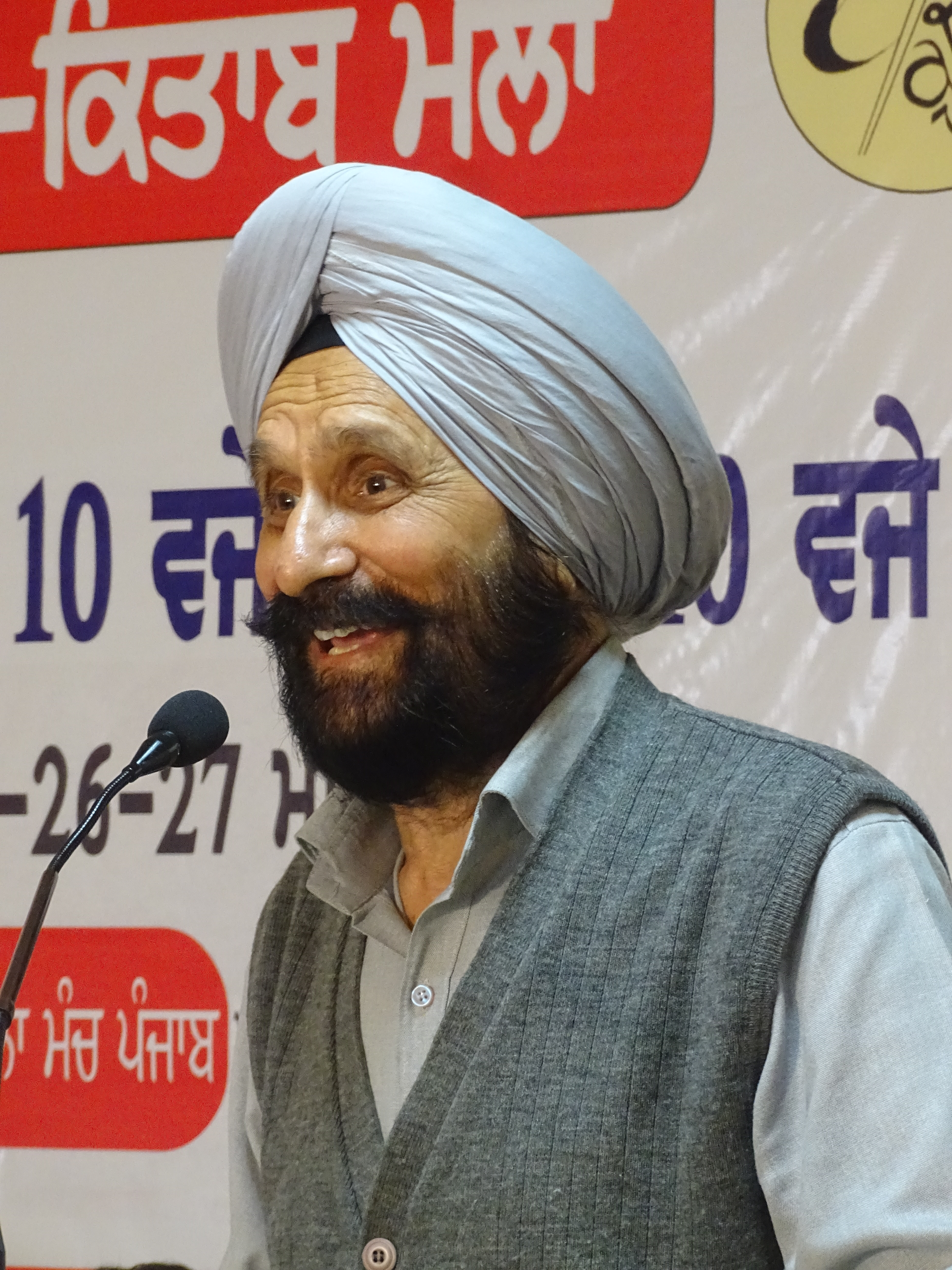
- Born: 10 September 1945 (age 80); Nanke, Amritsar district, Punjab, British Raj
- Occupation: Author
- Spouse: Rajwant Kaur Sandhu
- Children: Rupinder Kaur, Supan Sandhu, Ramneek Kaur
- Writing career
- Language: Punjabi
- Period: 1967–present
- Genre: short story
- Literary movement: socialism

Waryam Singh Sandhu (born 10 September 1945) is an Indian author of short stories. In 2000, he was awarded the Sahitya Akademi Award for his short story collection Chauthi koot. Although he writes in Punjabi, his works have been translated into Hindi, Bengali, Urdu and English.

== Early life ==
Sandhu was born in the village of Nanke in British Punjab in 1945. He was the oldest of six children; three brothers and two sisters. After graduating with a Bachelor of Education degree, he became a school teacher.

== Career ==
Sandhu published his first story "Akhan Vich Mar Gayi Khushi" in the Punjabi magazine Preetlari. In 1998, he released Chauthi koot. In 2015, two stories from the collection were adapted into the film The Fourth Direction.

Sandhu, who holds a Doctor of Philosophy degree, retired as a lecturer from Lyallpur Khalsa College, Jalandhar. He entered into the arena of non-fiction after his retirement, penning several volumes about the Ghadar Party. In 2019, he returned his Sahitya Akademi Award in protest of the Modi administration.

== Works ==
=== Short story collections ===
- 1971 Lohe De hath
- 1981 Ang sang
- 1987 Bhajian Bahin
- 1998 Chauthi koot
- 2000 Til Phul
- 2021 Jamraud
- Apna Apna Hissa (Selected 15 stories)
- Chonvian Kahanian (Jatt Di Jun)
- ..Til-Ful te Hor Kahania

=== Non-fiction ===
- Kulwant Singh Virk Da Kahani Sansar
- Kushti Da Dhroo Tara-Kartar Singh
- Pardesi Panjab
- ..Vagdi-E-Ravi
- ..Novelkar Sohan Singh Seetal-Smaj-Shashtri pripekh
- ..Padhia-Vachia
- ..Sahitak-Swaijiwani
- ..Gupha Vichli Udaan
- ..Ghadri Jarnail Kartar Singh Sarabha
- ..Sahid Bhai Mewa Singh Lopoke
- ..Ghadar Lehar di Gatha
- ..Ghadri Babe Kaun San
- ..Ghadar Lehar da Choumukhia Chirag
- Guru Nanak Patshah nu MildiaN

== Awards ==
- 1979 Hira Singh Dard Award
- 1980 Bhai Veer Singh Purskar from Guru Nanak Dev University
- 1981 Punjab Sahit Academy Award
- 1990 Sujan Singh Purskar
- 1992 Navtej Singh Purskar
- 1993 Manjit Yadgari Purskar Canada
- 1997 Waris-Shah Purskar-Punjabi Sath
- 1988 Kulwant Singh Virk Purskar
- 1999 Maulavi Ghulam Rasool Purskar
- 1999 Sahit Trust Dhudike Purskar
- 1999 Punjab Lok Sabhiacharik Manch Purskar
- 2000 Hashim Shah Purskar
- 2000 Pash Yadgari Purskar
- 2000 Kartar Singh Dhaliwal Purskar
- 2000 Sahitya Akademi Award for Punjabi
- 2001 Waris Shah Purskar-World Punjabi Conference Lahore
- 2002 Punjab Rattan Purskar
- 2003 Sharomani Punjabi Sahitkar Award-Bhasha Vibhag Punjab
- 2003 Waris Shah Purskar-World Punjabi Conference London
- 2019 Punjab Gaurav Purskar-Punjab Arts Council
