= Gurvinder Singh (director) =

Indian film director

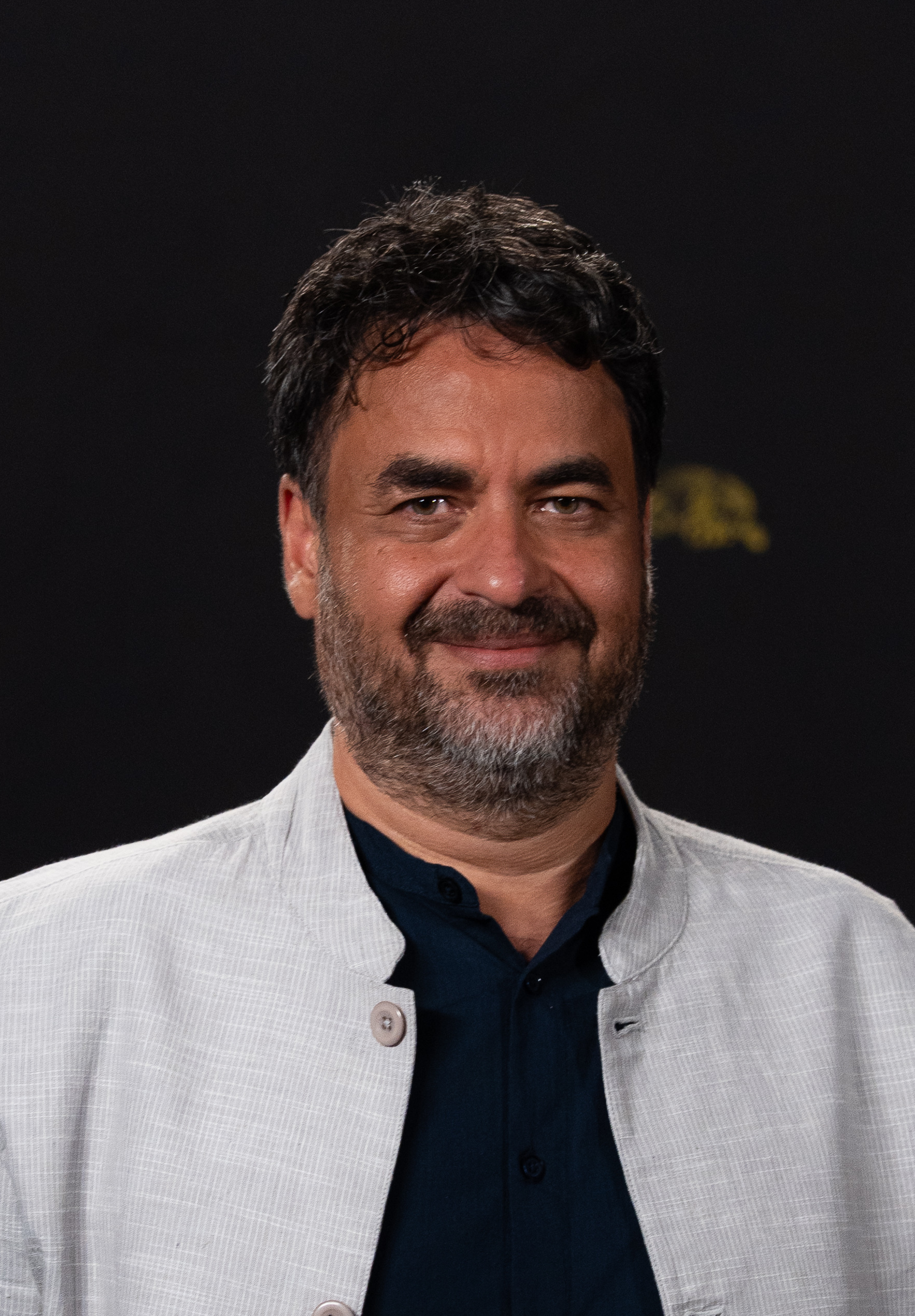
- Singh in 2026
- Occupation: Director

Gurvinder Singh is an Indian film director. He is best known for his Punjabi language films Anhe Ghore Da Daan, and Chauthi Koot (The Fourth Direction) which premiered at Venice and Cannes Film Festival respectively. Gurvinder is an alumnus of the prestigious Film and Television Institute of India (FTII), Pune from where he studied film-making and graduated in 2001. He travelled extensively through Punjab between 2002 and 2006, living and traveling with folk itinerants, documenting folk ballads and oral narratives. It led to his first documentary 'Pala'. He continued to make short experimental works and documenting arts/artists for the next few years. In 2005 he was invited by avant-garde Indian filmmaker Mani Kaul to be his teaching assistant for a master-class at FTII, which led to a close association with the filmmaker who became his mentor. He translated and published a book of conversations of Udayan Vajpeyi with Mani Kaul, titled 'Uncloven Space'. His latest film is 'Infiltrator' starring Veer Rajwant Singh which is a 15-minute short story in an international omnibus called 'In the same garden'

== Career ==
His first short film Pala was a documentary based on one of the Punjabi folk singers and was sponsored by India Foundation for the Arts (IFA). He directed his first fiction feature in Punjabi, Anhe Ghore Da Daan (English: Alms for a Blind Horse) in 2011. The film, based on the novel of the same name by well-known Punjabi writer Gurdial Singh, dealt with the angst and distress of the marginalised lower caste in Punjab.

The film premiered at the Venice Film Festival and screened at various festivals including Rotterdam, Busan, London, Munich, etc., besides releasing at the Museum of Modern Art (MoMA), New York. It won the 'Special Jury Award' at Abu Dhabi Film Festival, and the 'Golden Peacock' for Best Film at the International Film Festival of India, Goa, in 2012. It also won three National Awards in India, including National Film Award for Best Direction and National Film Award for Best Cinematography’ at the 59th National Film Awards presented on 3 May 2012.The award consisted of 'Golden Lotus Award (Swarna Kamal)', a certificate and a cash prize of ₹250,000 (US$2,600)/-. The jury presented the awards for,

...its haunting portrayal of the lives of people in a village as they battle with the reality of large scale industrial development. The director deploys an inventive storytelling form where sound, space and body operate distinctly to frame the experience of a fragile existence. Each face portrayed in the film carries the signs of persistent trauma. This is an aesthetic tour de force that confidently and successfully reinvents the contours of Indian experimental cinema.

His second feature Chauthi Koot (The Fourth Direction), an Indo-French co-production, premiered in 'Un Certain Regard' competition at the Cannes Film Festival in 2015. Based on two short stories by Punjabi writer Waryam Singh Sandhu, the film explores the fear, mistrust and paranoia in Punjab in the background of the militant unrest in the 1980s. The New York Times write in one review,

...a fictional tale that opens with two Hindu men running and closes with them walking together with several newfound Sikh confederates in a quietly moving assertion of Indian unity. In between, the country’s political and religious agonies largely shudder right below the surface, creating intense, palpable unease.

The film has travelled to various international festivals and won the 'Grand Prix' at the Belgrade Auteur Film Festival, the Singapore International Film Festival Silver Screen Award for Best Asian Feature Film. and the 'Golden Gateway' for Best Indian Film at the Mumbai Film Festival. It received the National Award for 'Best Punjabi Film' in 2015. The film recently had a commercial release in France and is due to release in India in August 2016.

He has also directed music videos for singers Rabbi Shergill and Jasbir Jassi for their respective renditions of Punjabi folk song Jugni.

Gurvinder Singh on the sets of 'Infiltrator', 2016

In 2016, he was invited by a Turkish production house to direct a short film ‘Infiltrator’ (16 mins) as part of an international anthology of ten short films from ten countries, titled “In The Same Garden”. The anthology premiered at the Sarajevo Film Festival in 2016 and also screened at the Warsaw Film Festival and Mumbai Film Festival. He was invited by the Belgrade Film Festival in November 2016 to be the president of the jury for awarding the ‘Grand Prix’ at the festival. In the same year, he completed a travelogue film on the well-known Punjabi poet and friend Amarjit Chandan, titled Awaazan (Voices). The film follows the poet's meetings with old friends and comrades through East Punjab and culminates in a meeting with John Berger in France.

He made an experimental film based on the short stories of the Colombian writer Garbriel Garcia Marquez as part of workshop with the students of acting at the FTII. The film titled ‘Sea of Lost Time’ (45 mins) premiered at the Rotterdam Film Festival in 2019.

His next feature blending fiction and reality, ‘Khanaur’ (Bitter Chestnut) in ‘Pahari’ dialect of Himachal Pradesh, premiered at the Busan International Film Festival in 2019 and was nominated for the Kim Jiseok Award. The film had its Indian Premiere at MAMI, 2019 and its European premiere at Rotterdam Film Festival, 2020.

His new feature in Punjabi Adh Chanani Raat (Crescent Night), based on a novel of the same title by Punjabi writer Gurdial Singh, is invited at the 51st International Film Festival Rotterdam to be held from 26 January to 6 February 2022.

He has taught filmmaking at the Film & Television Institute of India (Pune), Satyajit Ray Film Institute (Kolkata), National Institute of Design (Ahmedabad) and the KR Narayanan National Institute of Visual Science and Arts (Kerala).

== Filmography ==
Year	Original Title	English Title	Language	Length	Notes
2003	Pala	Pala	Punjabi	65 minutes	Documentary of a Punjabi-folk balladeer
2004	Passage	Passage	-	-	Clip; Clip on passage of time focusing on ambient sounds
2004	A Winter Tale	A Winter Tale	-	-	Clip; An account of 6 days spent by Singh at his maternal grandmother's place in Delhi
2006	Riyāz	-	Hindi	61 minutes	A personal video diary film using an audio recording of filmmaker Mani Kaul giving a Dhrupad lesson to poet Udayan Vajpeyi.
2007	Legs Above my Feet	Legs Above my Feet	English & Hindi	40 minutes	Conversations with a Kathak dancer, Sushmita Ghosh
2008	An Untitled Film	An Untitled Film	-	-	Short film Interviews of FTII graduates
2009	Kavalam	Kavalam	Malayalam & English	60 minutes	Documentary on Kavalam Narayana Panicker
2011	Anhe Ghore Da Daan	Alms for a Blind Horse	Punjabi	113 minutes	First feature film, Winner of the 'Special Jury Award' at Abu Dhabi Film Festival, the 'Golden Peacock' for Best Film at the International Film Festival of India, Goa, and three national awards
2015	Chauthi Koot	The Fourth Direction	Punjabi	115 minutes	Second feature film, Winner of the Singapore International Film Festival Silver Screen Award for Best Asian Feature Film, Golden Gate Award for Best Film, MAMI. Grand Prix, Belgrade Auteur Film Festival
2016	Awaazan	Voices	Punjabi	45 minutes	Travelogue film on Punjabi poet Amarjit Chandan
2016	Ghuspaithia	Infiltrator	Punjabi	45 minutes	Short film part of the omnibus titled 'In The Same Garden'
2019	Khanaur	Bitter Chestnut	Pahari, Hindi & English	100 minutes	Third feature film, World Premiere at Busan International Film Festival in 2019; nominated for the Kim Jiseok Award. Indian Premiere at MAMI, 2019 and its European premiere at Rotterdam Film Festival, 2020
2022	Adh Chanani Raat	Crescent Night	Punjabi	109 minutes	Post-production
2024	Lantrani	-	-	-	Anthology Hindi Film
2026	Rehmat		Punjabi, English	157 minutes	World premiere in the main competition of the 79th Locarno Film Festival

== Bibliography ==
- Uncloven Space (translation) - book of conversations of Udayan Vajpeyi with Mani Kaul (2013)

== Awards ==
59th National Film Awards

- 2011 – Best Direction for Anhe Ghore Da Daan
- 2011 – Best Feature Film in Punjabi for Anhe Ghore Da Daan; shared with NFDC (producer)

63rd National Film Awards

- 2015 – Best Feature Film in Punjabi for Chauthi Koot; shared with NFDC & Kartikeya Singh (producers)

Others

- 2011- Special Jury Award for Anhe Ghore Da Daan, Abu Dhabi Film Festival
- 2012 – Golden Peacock for Best Film for Anhe Ghore Da Daan, International Film Festival of India
- 2012 – Best Film for Anhe Ghore Da Daan, Imagine India Film Festival, Madrid
- 2012 – Paris Project Award at the 10th Hong Kong – Asia Film Financing Forum for Chauthi Koot. Shared with Flowing Stories directed by Tsang Tsui-shan.
- 2015 – Golden Gateway for Chauthi Koot, MAMI Mumbai Film Festival
- 2015 – Grand Prix for Chauthi Koot, Belgrade Auteur Film Festival
- 2015 – Silver Screen Award for Best Asian Film for Chauthi Koot, Singapore International Film Festival
