= Marhi Da Deeva (film) =

- Poster
- Directed by: Surinder Singh
- Story by: Gurdial Singh
- Based on: Marhi Da Deeva by Gurdial Singh
- Produced by: Ravi Malik
- Starring: Raj Babbar; Deepti Naval; Parikshit Sahni; Pankaj Kapoor; Kanwaljit; Asha Sharma; Harbhajan Jabhal; Gopi Bhalla
- Cinematography: Anil Sehgal
- Edited by: Subhash Sehgal
- Music by: Mahinderjit Singh
- Release date: 1989
- Running time: 115 minutes
- Country: India
- Language: Punjabi

Marhi Da Deeva is a 1989 Indian Punjabi-language film directed by Surinder Singh, starring Raj Babbar, Deepti Naval and Parikshit Sahni in the lead roles. It was a critically acclaimed and well-received film based on a novel of the same name by Gurdial Singh. It won the National Award for Best Feature Film in Punjabi.

== Music ==
Mahinderjit Singh composed the music with playback singers Jaspal Singh and Prabhsharan Kaur Sidhu. Lyrics were written by Naqsh Lyallpuri.

== Cast ==
| Actor/Actress | Role |
|---|---|
| Raj Babbar | Jagseer Singh/Jagsa |
| Deepti Naval | Bhan Kaur/Bhani |
| Parikshit Sahni | Dharam Singh (Voiced by Sardar Sohi) |
| Kanwaljit Singh | Bhant Singh/Bhanta |
| Asha Sharma | Nandi (Jagsa's mother) |
| Harbhajan Jabhal | Thola Singh (Jagsa's father) |
| Pankaj Kapoor | Raunki |
| Gopi Bhalla | Nikka Singh/Nikka |
