= Marhi Da Deeva (novel) =

1964 novel by Gurdial Singh

- Author: Gurdial Singh
- Original title: ਮੜ੍ਹੀ ਦਾ ਦੀਵਾ
- Language: Punjabi
- Subject: Life of a poor
- Genre: Social
- Publication date: 1964
- Publication place: India
- Media type: Print

Marhi Da Deeva (Originally in Punjabi: ਮੜ੍ਹੀ ਦਾ ਦੀਵਾ, Literally meaning: The Lamp of the Tomb), sometimes spelled as Marhi Da Diva, is a 1964 Punjabi novel by Gurdial Singh. This first novel established Gurdial Singh as a novelist. The author himself described it as the first Punjabi novel in "critical realism". It came in for high praise, with some critics calling it a landmark equivalent to Premchand's Godan. It was translated as The Last Flicker by the Sahitya Akademi.

== Adaptation ==
The novel was adapted into a 1989 Punjabi film of the same name. Surinder Singh directed the film, which starred Raj Babbar, Deepti Naval and Parikshit Sahni in lead roles. The film received a National Film Award and was critically acclaimed.
