= Surjit Patar =

Indian Punjabi language poet and writer (1945–2024)

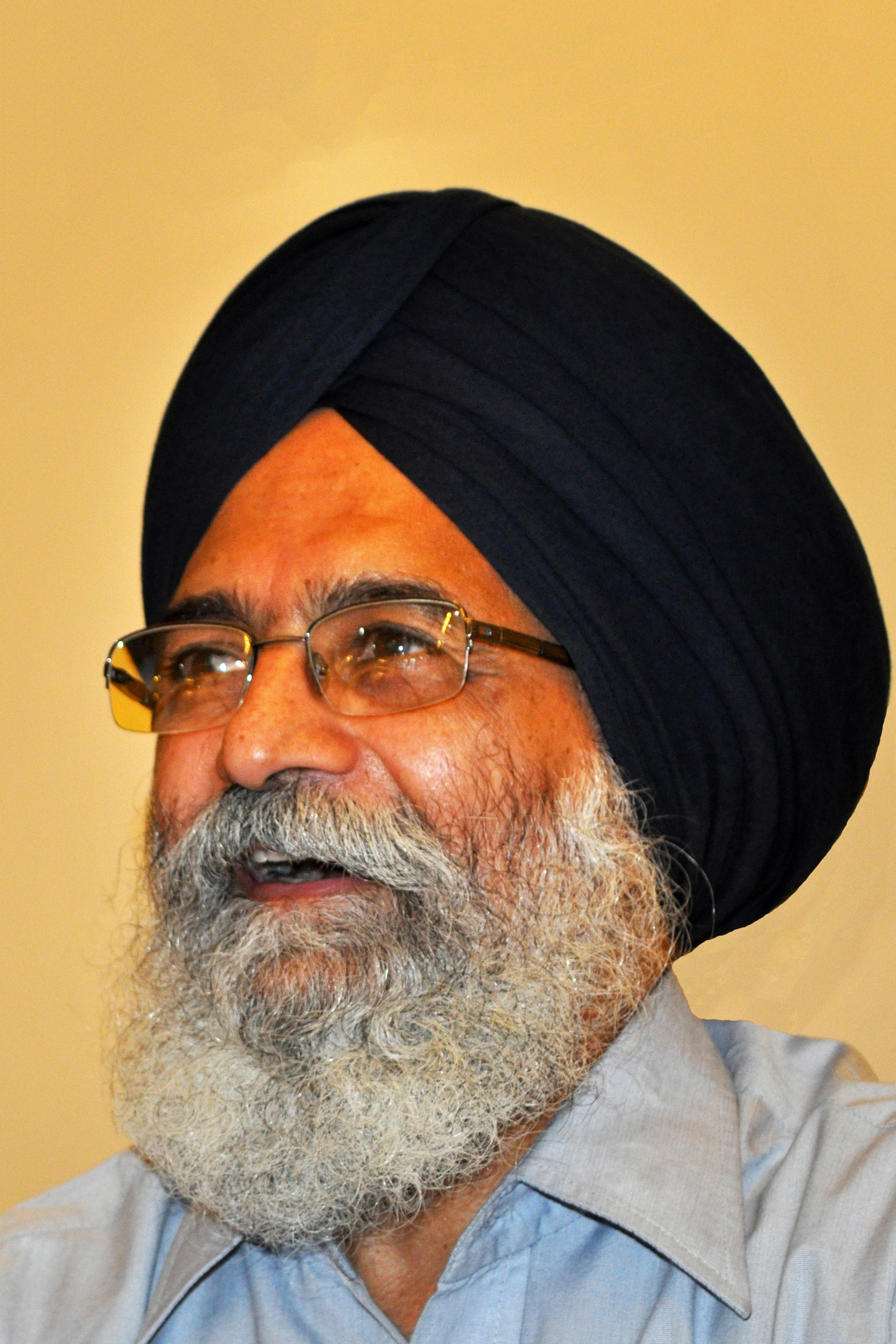
- Patar in 2010
- Born: Surjit Hunjan; 14 January 1945; Pattar Kalan, Punjab Province, British India
- Died: 11 May 2024 (aged 79); Ludhiana, Punjab, India
- Education: Guru Nanak Dev University (PhD)
- Occupations: Writer; poet; teacher
- Writing career
- Language: Punjabi

Surjit Patar (born Surjit Hunjan; 14 January 1945 – 11 May 2024) was an Indian Punjabi language writer and poet from Punjab. His poems enjoy immense popularity with the general public and have won high acclaim from critics.

== Biography ==
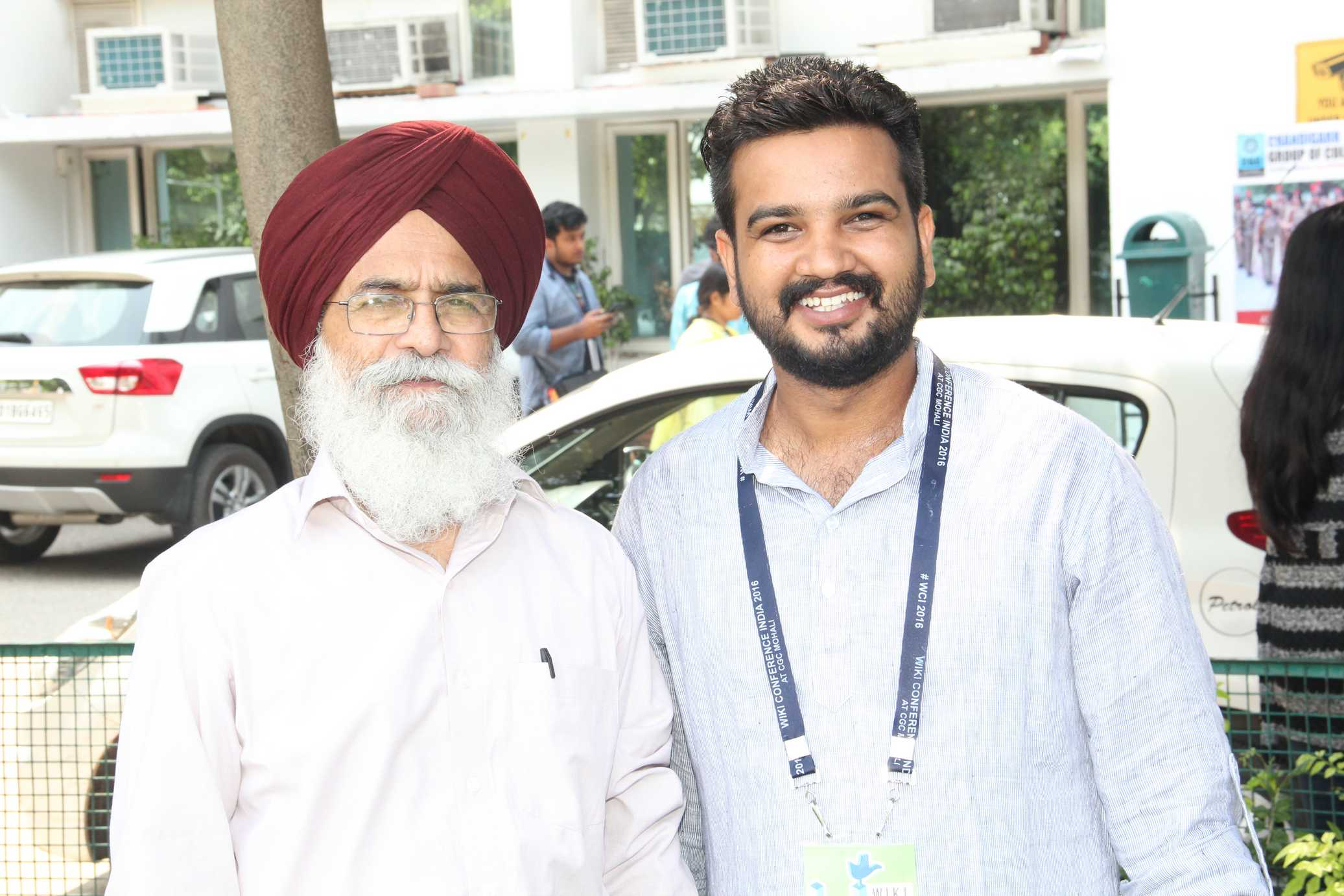
Surjit Patar with a fan

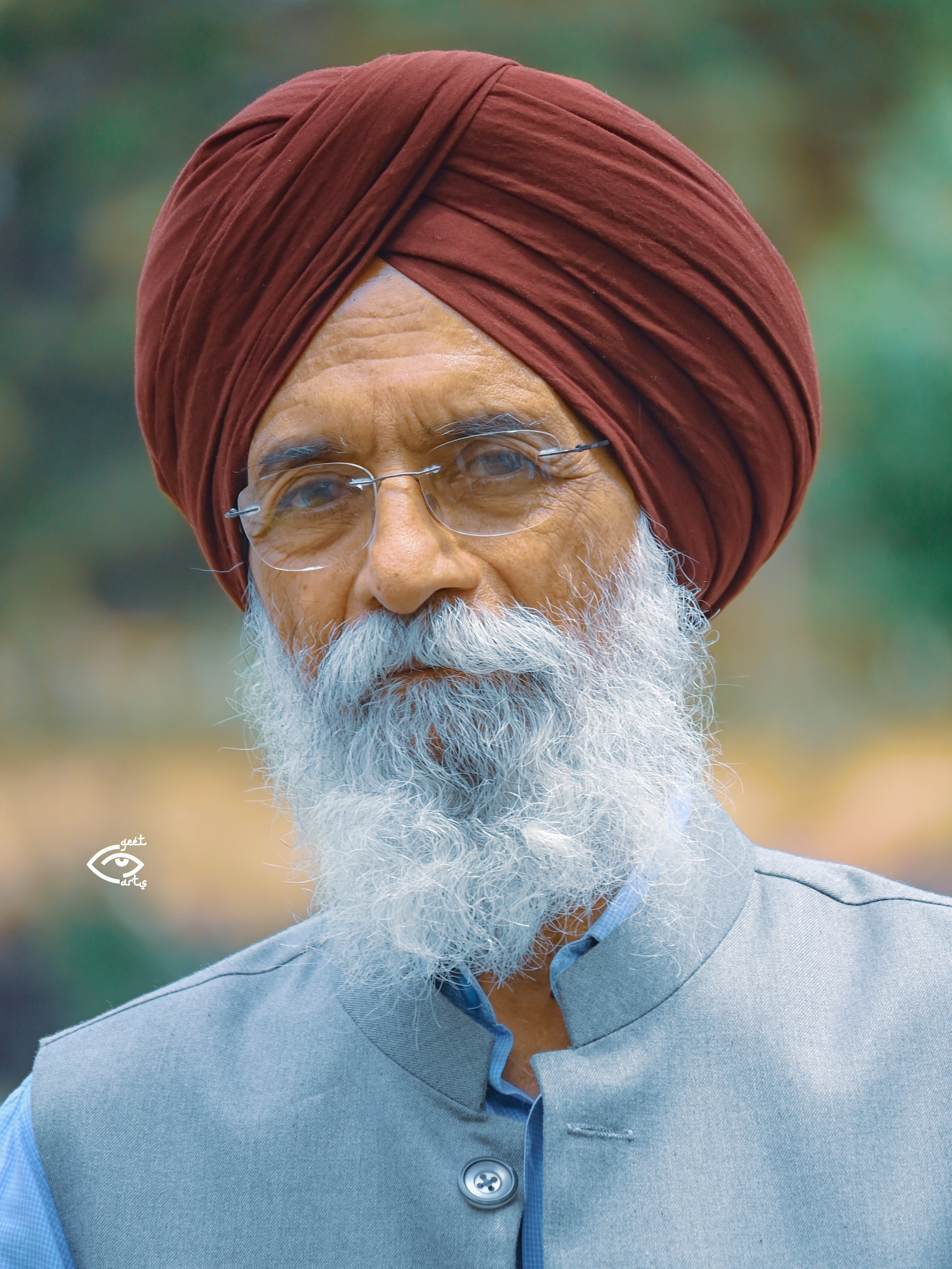
Surjit Patar (2024)

Patar hailed from the village of Pattar (Punjabi: ਪੱਤੜ) Kalan in Jalandhar district from which he got his surname. His father's name was Harbhajan Singh and mother's Harbhajan Kaur. He had four older sisters. His father had migrated to Kenya for work and would only return home for short time after every five years. He matriculated from a nearby village school. After that admitted in as science student in a college in Kapurthala. But the next year, he took up Arts.

Patar graduated from Randhir College, Kapurthala and then went on to get a master's degree from Punjabi University, Patiala and then a PhD in Literature on "Transformation of Folklore in Guru Nanak Vani" from Guru Nanak Dev University, Amritsar. He then joined the academic profession and retired as Professor of Punjabi from Punjab Agricultural University, Ludhiana. He started writing poetry in the mid-1960s. Among his works of poetry are "Hawa Vich Likhe Harf" (Words written in the Air), Birkh Arz Kare (Thus Spake the Tree), Hanere Vich Sulagdi Varnmala (Words Smouldering in the Dark), Lafzaan Di Dargah (Shrine of Words), Patjhar Di Pazeb (Anklet of Autumn) and Surzameen (Music Land).

Patar translated into Punjabi the three tragedies of Federico García Lorca, the play Nagmandala of Girish Karnad, and poems of Bertolt Brecht and Pablo Neruda. He also adapted plays from Jean Giraudoux, Euripides and Racine. He wrote television scripts on Punjabi poets from Sheikh Farid to Shiv Kumar Batalvi.

Patar was president of the Punjab Arts Council, Chandigarh. Earlier, he had held the office of the President, Punjabi Sahit Akademi, Ludhiana. He was awarded Padma Shri in 2012.

=== Death ===
Patar died of cardiac arrest at his residence on Barewal Road in Ludhiana, on 11 May 2024, at the age of 79. According to his family members, he did not wake up that morning and was declared dead after arriving in the hospital.

== Works ==
Among Patar's works are "Candles", "Hanere Vich Sulagdi Varanmala", "Aiya Nand Kishore", "Hanera Jarega Kiven", "Fasla", and "Koi Daalia Cho Langeya Hawa Bann Ke".

== Filmography ==
Surjit Patar wrote dialogues for the Punjabi films Shaheed Uddham Singh and Videsh, the Punjabi version of Deepa Mehta's film Heaven on Earth.

== Awards ==
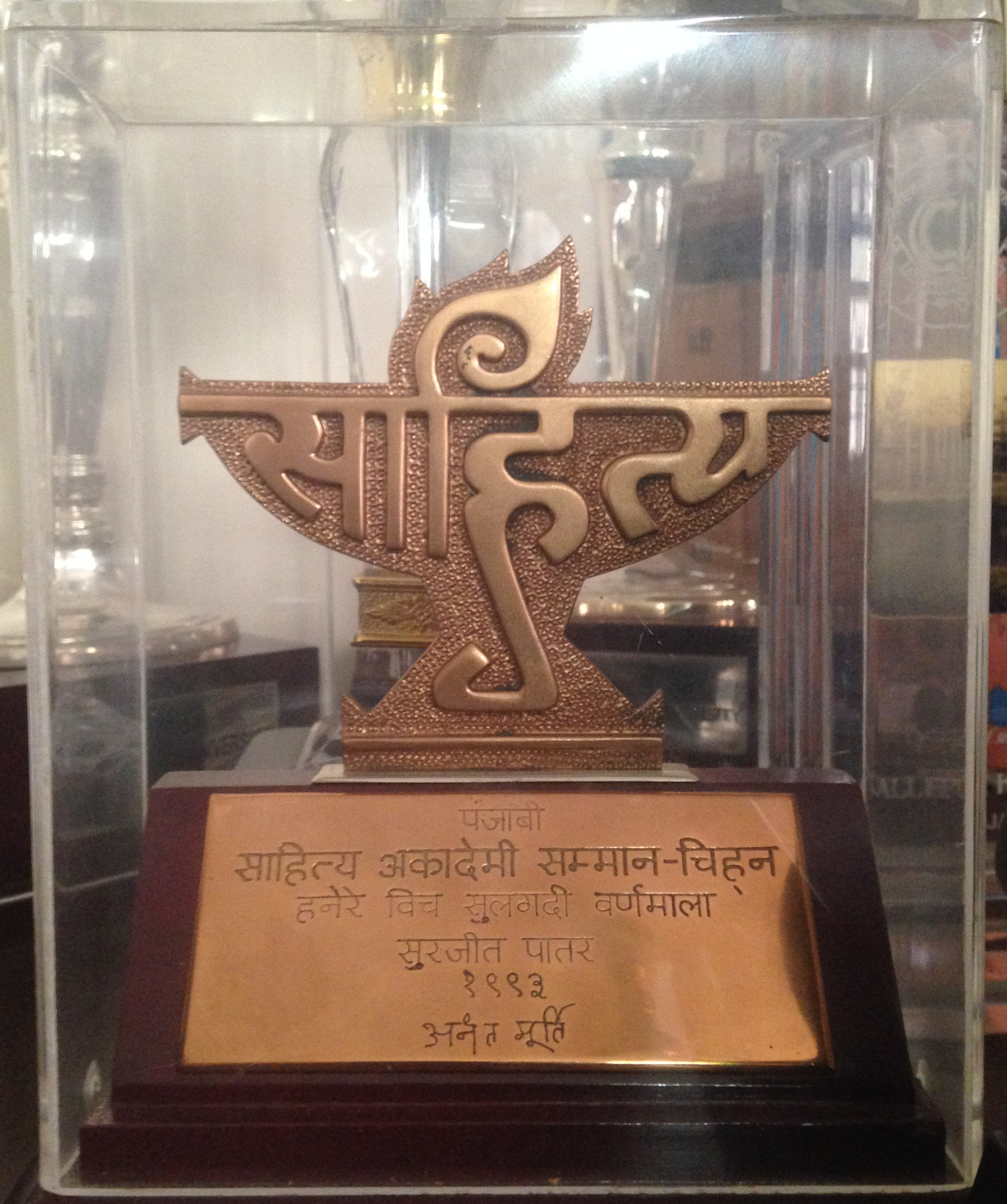
Sahitya Akademi Award – Surjit Patar

- 1979: Punjab Sahitya Akademi Award
- 1993: Sahitya Akademi Award for Hanere Vich Sulghdi Varnmala
- 1999: Panchnad Puruskar by Bhartiya Bhasha Parishad, Kolkata
- 2007–2008: Anad Kav Sanman
- 2009: Saraswati Samman by K.K.Birla foundation.
- 2009: Gangadhar National Award for Poetry, Sambalpur University, Orissa
- 2012: Padma Shri Award in the field of Literature and Education (fourth highest civilian award in the Republic of India)
- 2014: Kusumagraj Literary Award

== See also ==
- Ajit Cour
- Prof. Puran Singh (writer)
- Vir Singh (writer)
