= Sikh studies =

Academic study of Sikhism and related topics

Sikh studies is a field of academia focused on the study of Sikhism. It is sometimes referred to as Sikhology with its academics called Sikhologists. It remains an understudied yet growing field of scholarly work.

== Focus ==
The field focuses on "the Sikh community, its history, and religious culture, Sikhism."

== Language of literature produced ==
The majority of serious academic literature produced remains in European languages, such as English, French, and German, but there are many works being produced in Indic languages, such as in Hindi, Urdu, and especially Punjabi.

== History ==
The field is seen as beginning around the mid-20th century, during the time of the partition of the Indian subcontinent into two domains: Pakistan and India. Literature in European languages regarding Sikhs and Sikhism has existed since the 18th century but the institutional environment did not exist at that period to further these inquiries and attempts into a proper field of study. With worldwide interest in the Sikhs growing in the aftermath of the partition, increased Sikh migration around the world, plights of ethnic and religious minorities being recognized, the institutional apparatus needed to birth the field of Sikh studies began to form and take shape.

Initially, the field focused on historical and philological textual study but later-on delved into philosophy and ethics. The early works were authored with the aim to "assert the uniqueness of Sikhs as a separate world religion". However, recent works produced have ventured into exploring anthropology, sociology, and political sciences of the Sikhs. Whilst the field looks at the Sikhs as being a production of the cultural framework and tapestry of the Indian subcontinent and its civilization, scholars in the field admit that the Sikhs oftentimes "confounds categorical schema at every turn".

Recently, a newfound direction of the field is toward "incorporation of critical modes of thinking, theory, philosophy, and antiphilosophy which uses central Sikh texts, culture, and history to engage and actualize Sikh thinking to force an encounter with its hegemonic other."

In 2020, the Dr. Ranjit Singh Sabharwal Endowed Fund for Sikh Studies was established at the University of California, Berkeley. The University of Toronto Mississauga (UTM) established a Sikh Studies endowed chair in 2024 to improve research in the field. It is the only one of its kind in Canada.

Pakistani scholarship on the Sikhs is influenced by the ideological narrative of national liberation and remains limited to either viewing them as minorities misled by the Hindu Congress or as perpetrators of partition violence, with this demonization being utilized during the tenure of Zia-ul-Haq for Islamization via Pakistan Studies.

=== Controversies ===
Pashaura Singh's scholarly work has faced push-back and criticism from some traditionalist and conservative sections of the Sikh community.

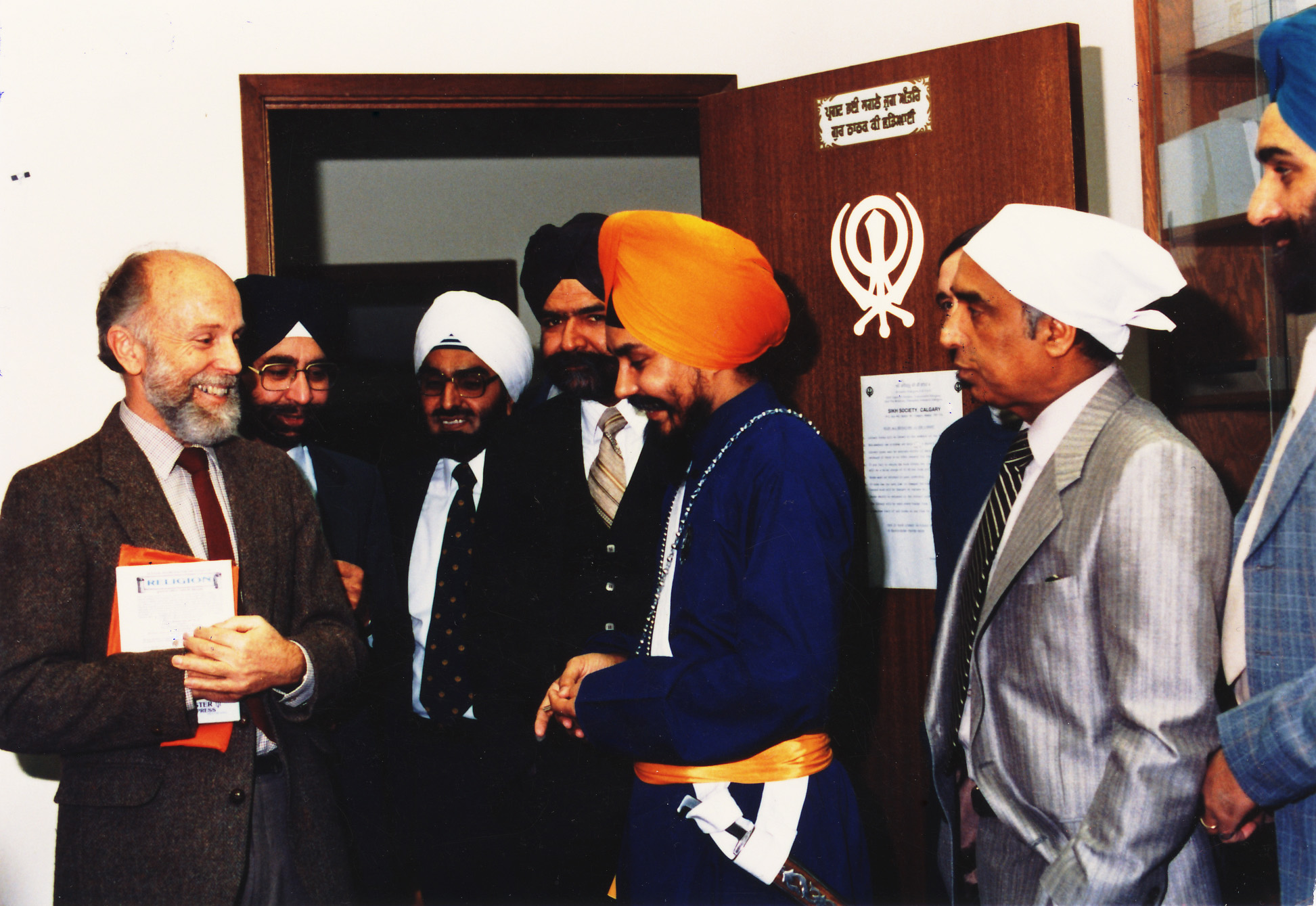
William Hewat McLeod meeting Pashaura Singh (then a granthi) in Calgary, Canada, 1987. The photograph from the collection of Amarjit Chandan.

A few Sikh groups have put pressure on universities to stifle academic criticism of popular Sikh literature and theories of Sikh history. In the early 1990s, Pashaura Singh, an academic of the Macleodian school, was campaigned against for challenging the authenticity of Guru Granth Sahib. Singh was pressured to withdraw sections of his thesis. The Akal Takht issued a statement that Pashaura Singh was afforded due opportunity by the Akal Rakhta and other Sikh scholars on his comparative method (borrowed from Trumpp) and his hypothesis of the draft theory was rejected as forcibly injecting undated texts dated much beyond the timeline of the Adi Granth. Another academic also praised by MacLeod, Harjot Oberoi, was also campaigned against for his removal by parties which denounced his methodology towards the study of Sikhism.

According to the Indologist Mark Juergensmeyer, the largest group of scholars dedicated to Sikh Studies are based in and near Punjab, but these scholars project themselves as proud Sikhs and predominantly focus on showing distinctiveness of their faith rather than examine the connections and similarities of Sikhism to other religious traditions based on comparative studies of texts and manuscripts. Sikh writers criticize methodologies to "coldly dissect" their personal faith and Sikh history by "methods of social science" and by critical comparative textual or literary analysis. This, critiques Juergensmeyer, has set the stage for an "unhappy confrontation" between the academic scholars versus those motivated in defending the dignity of their faith, including publications by Sikh institutions that are hostile to W. H. McLeod and other scholars who are based outside India, and as Juergensmeyer states, some conservative Sikh scholars have made important contributions to the scholarship of Sikhism by discovering old Sikh manuscripts and publishing their analysis.

== Schools of thought ==
There are five identified schools of historiography within the field of Sikh studies:

- Traditional School, this school is labelled as "rhetorical" and "ideological" and is based primarily upon the envisionment of the religion by the late 19th century Singh Sabha movement reformers, using a "retrospective lens".
- Colonial School, this school was founded by the British colonial-era officials, administrators, and scholars, such as Max Arthur Macauliffe, and attempted to write about Sikhs in a way that asserted their distinctiveness from the prevailing Hinduism. It was heavily influenced by the traditional Sikh narratives.
- Sanatanist School, this school views Sikhism as under the umbrella of Hinduism at-large and an expression of Hinduism. They did not agree with the views of both the Traditional School and Colonial School. Many unorthodox, heterodox, and heretical Sikh sects (sampradya), whom continue a lineage of living Gurus, were and are followers of this school of thought.
- Positivist School, formed in the 1960s, it was pioneered by W. H. McLeod. This school challenges the views of the prior three schools and asserts that it relies upon "empirical research" and "critical appraisal" of the religion's community, scriptural, historical, and literary sources.
- Modernist School, formed recently, it uses methodologies sourced from feminism, post-colonialism, subaltern, post-structuralism. They assert that prevailing narratives commonly accepted as truths of the religion must be critically questioned and analyzed. They focus on the intersectionality of gender and marginalized socio-religious groups within Sikhism.

These schools may disagree on facts but also on interpretation of said facts. Differences between the various schools of thought have increased since 1984, a tumultuous year for the Sikhs.

== List of prominent Sikh studies scholars ==
=== Historical pioneers ===
- Max Arthur Macauliffe
- Ernest Trumpp
- Kahn Singh Nabha
- Puran Singh
- Teja Singh
- Ganda Singh
- Hari Ram Gupta
- Vir Singh
- Balbir Singh
- Karam Singh
- Randhir Singh
- Sahib Singh

=== Modern academics ===
- William Hewat McLeod
- Pashaura Singh
- Gurinder Singh Mann
- Harjeet Singh Grewal
- Jagtar Singh Grewal
- Jaswant Singh Neki
- Harjot Oberoi
- Harjinder Singh Dilgeer
- Gurbachan Singh Talib
- Khushwant Singh
- Harbans Singh
- Devinder Pal Singh
- Nikky-Guninder Kaur Singh
- Jagbir Jhutti Johal
- Jvala Singh
- Opinderjit Takhar

== Institutions and organizations ==
- Sikh Research Institute (SRI)
- Institute of Sikh Studies (IOSS; Chandigarh), founded in 1989

== Periodicals ==
Some Sikh studies journals are as follows:

- Abstracts of Sikh Studies (formerly Sikh Studies Quarterly), published the Institute of Sikh Studies (IOSS; Chandigarh) since 1991 with 25 volumes published, quarterly
- Gurmat Parkash
- Guru Gobind Singh Journal of Religious Studies. Chandigarh: Guru Gobind Singh Foundation, 1994–, quarterly.
- Guru Nanak Journal of Sociology. Amritsar: Guru Nanak Dev University, 1980–, semiannual.
- International Journal of Punjab Studies. New Delhi: Sage, 1994–, seminannual.
- International Journal of Sikh Affairs (formerly Sikhs, Past and Present). Edmonton, Canada: Sikh Educational Trust. 1998–, semiannual.
- Journal of Regional History. Amritsar: Guru Nanak Dev University. 1980–, semiannual.
- Journal of Religious Studies. Patiala: Punjabi University. 1972–, semiannual.
- Journal of Sikh Studies. Amritsar: Guru Nanak Dev University, 1972–, semiannual.
- Journal of Sikh & Punjab Studies, originating in the United Kingdom under the title 'International Journal of Punjab Studies', published since 1994. Currently operates under the purview of Gurinder Singh Mann. 29 volumes published as of 2023
- Khera: Journal of Religious Understanding. New Delhi: Bhai Vir Singh Sahitya Sadan, 1981–, quarterly.
- Khoj Darpan. Amritsar: Guru Nanak Dev University, 1979–1995.
- Missionary: A Quarterly Journal on Sikh Religion, Culture, and History. New Delhi: Sikh Missionary Society.1959–1963, quarterly.
- Nishaan Nagaara, published since 1999 by the Chardi Kala Foundation. New Delhi: Nagaara Trust, 2000–, quarterly.
- Panchbati Sandesh. Dehradun: Dr. Balbir Singh Sahitya Kendra. 1977–, quarterly.
- Panjab Journal of Sikh Studies, published by the Panjab University, Chandigarh. Eight volumes have been published as of 2021.
- Panjab Past and Present. Patiala: Punjabi University, 1966–, semiannual
- Panjab University Research Bulletin: Arts. Chandigarh: Panjab University. 1969–, semiannual.
- Perspectives on Guru Granth Sahib. Amritsar: Guru Nanak Dev University. 2003–, annual.
- Proceedings of the Punjab History Conference. Patiala: Punjabi University. 1965–, annual.
- Punjab Journal of Education. Chandigarh: Department of Education. 1971–, quarterly.
- Punjab Journal of Politics. Amritsar: Guru Nanak Dev University. 1977–, semiannual.
- The Sikh Courier International. London: Sikh Cultural Society of Great Britain. 1960–, quarterly.
- The Sikh Review. Calcutta: Sikh Cultural Centre. 1953–, monthly.
- Sikh Formations: Religion, Culture, Theory, began in 2005, 19 volumes published as of 2023
- Sikh Research Journal (SRJ), published by The Sikh Foundation International, with eight volumes published as of 2023
- Sikh Studies. Brampton, Ontario: Centre for Sikh Studies. 1999–, semiannual.
- Studies in Sikhism and Comparative Religion. New Delhi: Guru Nanak Foundation. 1982–, semiannual.
- Understanding Sikhism: The Research Journal. Laval, Quebec: Institute for Understanding Sikhism. 1999–, semiannual.

== See also ==
- List of writers on Sikhism
- Criticism of Sikhism
- Sikh scriptures
- History of Sikhism
- Punjabi literature
