= List of writers on Sikhism =

This is a list of writers on Sikhism. The list should include writers who have Wikipedia articles who have written books about Sikhism. Each entry should indicate the writers most well-known work. Multiple works should be listed only if each work has a Wikipedia article.

- Bhai Vir Singh
- Bhagat Puran Singh
- Professor Puran Singh
- Randhir Singh
- Giani Sant Singh Maskeen
- Jaswant Singh Neki
- Max Arthur Macauliffe
- Rajkavi Inderjeet Singh Tulsi
- Karam Singh
- Bhai Kahn Singh
- G. B. Singh
- Khushwant Singh
- Gurbachan Singh Talib
- Harjinder Singh Dilgeer
- Fauja Singh (historian)
- Gurinder Singh Mann
- Harjot Oberoi

== See also ==
- List of modern Eastern religions writers
- Sikh studies
