= Gurinder =

Gurinder is a given name. Notable people with the name include:

- Gurinder Singh Garry Birring, Indian Politician, member of Punjab Legislative Assembly
- Gurinder Brar, Canadian politician from the Alberta New Democratic Party
- Gurinder Chadha, OBE (born 1960), Kenyan-born British film director of Indian origin
- Gurinder Gill (born 1996), Indian-born Canadian rapper-singer associated with Punjabi music
- Gurinder Josan CBE (born 1972), British politician and Member of Parliament
- Gurinder Kaur Kainth (born 1980), Indian singer and actress known as Miss Pooja
- Gurinder Singh Mann, Punjabi-American scholar and professor of Sikh studies
- Gurinder Sandhu (born 1993), Australian international cricketer
- Gurinder Singh, spiritual head of Radha Soami Satsang Beas (RSSB)
- Gurinder Singh (cricketer) (born 1992), Indian cricketer
- Gurinder Singh (field hockey) (born 1995), Indian field hockey player
- Gurinder Singh (volleyball) (born 1989), captain of India men's national volleyball team

== See also ==
- Gurinder Singh (disambiguation)
- Gorgeous Gurinder, character in a children's book
- Devinder
