= Criticism of Sikhism =

Sikhism has often been criticised by non-Sikhs regarding its texts, practices, and societal norms, but Sikhs and other scholars argue that these criticisms are flawed and are based on a biased and poor understanding of the texts, especially of the multiple languages used in the Sikh scriptures. They also argue that most Western scholars who attempted to interpret Eastern religious texts were missionaries and could not overcome the bias they carried with them, irrespective of whether they were translating the Quran, Vedas, Puranas or the Guru Granth Sahib.

Sikhism's founder Guru Nanak rejected ritualistic worship and encouraged belief in one God: Waheguru. The veneration and bowing to the Guru Granth Sahib, has often been interpreted by Western scholars as akin to idolatry, as observed by the Hindu faith, which defeats the ideology of Guru Nanak. Other scholars dismiss Sikhism as, either consciously (according to John Hardon) or spontaneously (according to John B. Noss), a syncretism of the Hindu Bhakti and Islamic Sufi movements.

== Ernest Trumpp ==
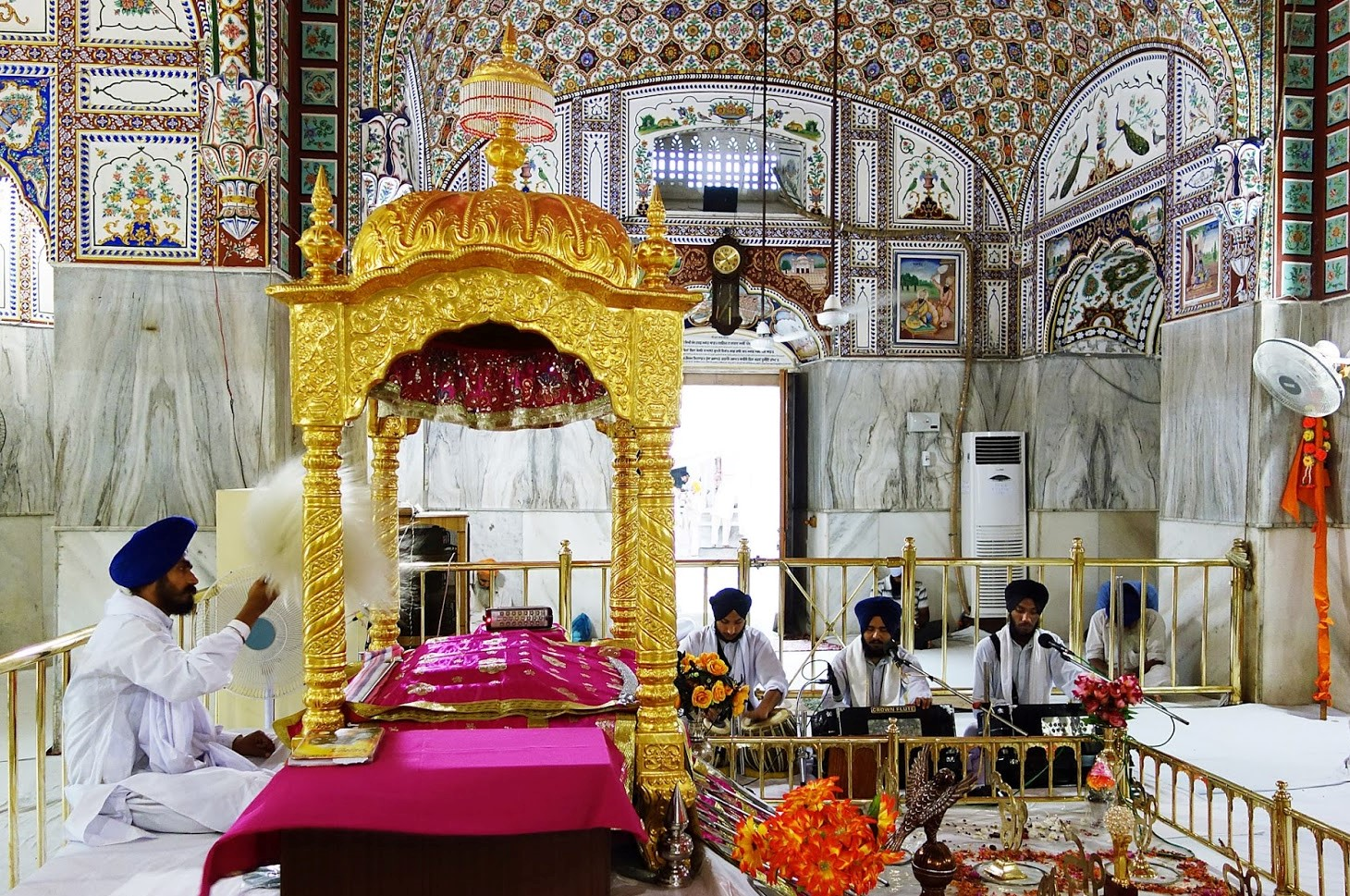
The Sikh scripture Guru Granth Sahib in a Gurdwara

Ernest Trumpp, a colonial-era Christian missionary sponsored by the Ecclesiastical Mission Society, was sent to Sindh and later to Punjab, to study the languages of the Indian subcontinent. In 1869, he was asked by the Secretary of State for India on behalf of the British government to translate the Adi Granth and Dasam Granth. He began studying and translating them, but opined that they were not worth translating in full, because "the same few ideas, were being endlessly repeated." Mandair argues that though Trumpp was a linguist, his lack of comprehension of the multiple languages used to compose the Granth and his interaction, which was limited to granthis of the Nirmala sect, led to a flawed interpretation. The Nirmala Sikhs were Sanskrit scholars, who interpreted Sikh scripture from a Brahminical framework. He further adds that the Nirmalas and Udasis rose to prominence at the expense of the mainstream Khalsa in the 18th century, which had been experiencing increased Mughal persecution in the 1700s that forced it to cede control of Sikh shrines to sects without external identifying articles, and subsequently focused on political sovereignty. Trumpp made no real effort to have a dialogue with established Sikh scholars of time such as Kahan Singh Nabha. He stated that the Sikh granthis who recited the text in the early 1870s lacked comprehension and its sense of meaning, largely because of the Vedic interpretation they attempted. He stated that "as a result of their warlike manner of life and the troubled times," that "Sikhs had lost all learning" and the granthis were misleading. However, Trumpp observed that the language of the Guru Granth Sahib is complex and hard to understand without an interpreter, especially in relation to important but complex ideas. According to Tony Ballantyne, Ernest Trumpp's insensitive approach such as treating the Sikh scripture as a mere book and blowing cigar smoke over its pages while studying the text, did not endear him to the Sikh granthis who regarded it as an embodiment of the Gurus.

Trumpp's lack of understanding of the multiple languages used in the Granth and the subtle changes in meaning led to his observation that that Sikhism was "a reform movement in spirit", but "completely failed to achieve anything of real religious significance", He concluding that the Sikhs he worked with did not understand the metaphysical speculations of their scripture. The Nirmala Sikh intelligentsia he met during his years of study, stated Trumpp, only had a "partial understanding" of their own scripture. He considered most Sikhs had become more of a military brotherhood with a martial spirit, inspired by the Sikh sense of their history and identity. His lack of comprehension led him to describe the scripture as "incoherent and shallow in the extreme, and couched at the same time in dark and perplexing language, in order to cover these defects. It is for us Occidentals a most painful and almost stupefying task, to read only a single Rag". Trumpp criticized Adi Granth to be lacking systematic unity, unlike the Christian texts, which had limited linguistic variance.

According to Indologist Mark Juergensmeyer, setting aside Ernest Trumpp's negative remarks, he was a German linguist and his years of scholarship, translations, as well as field notes and discussions have been used by contemporary scholars with caution.

== Other sects ==
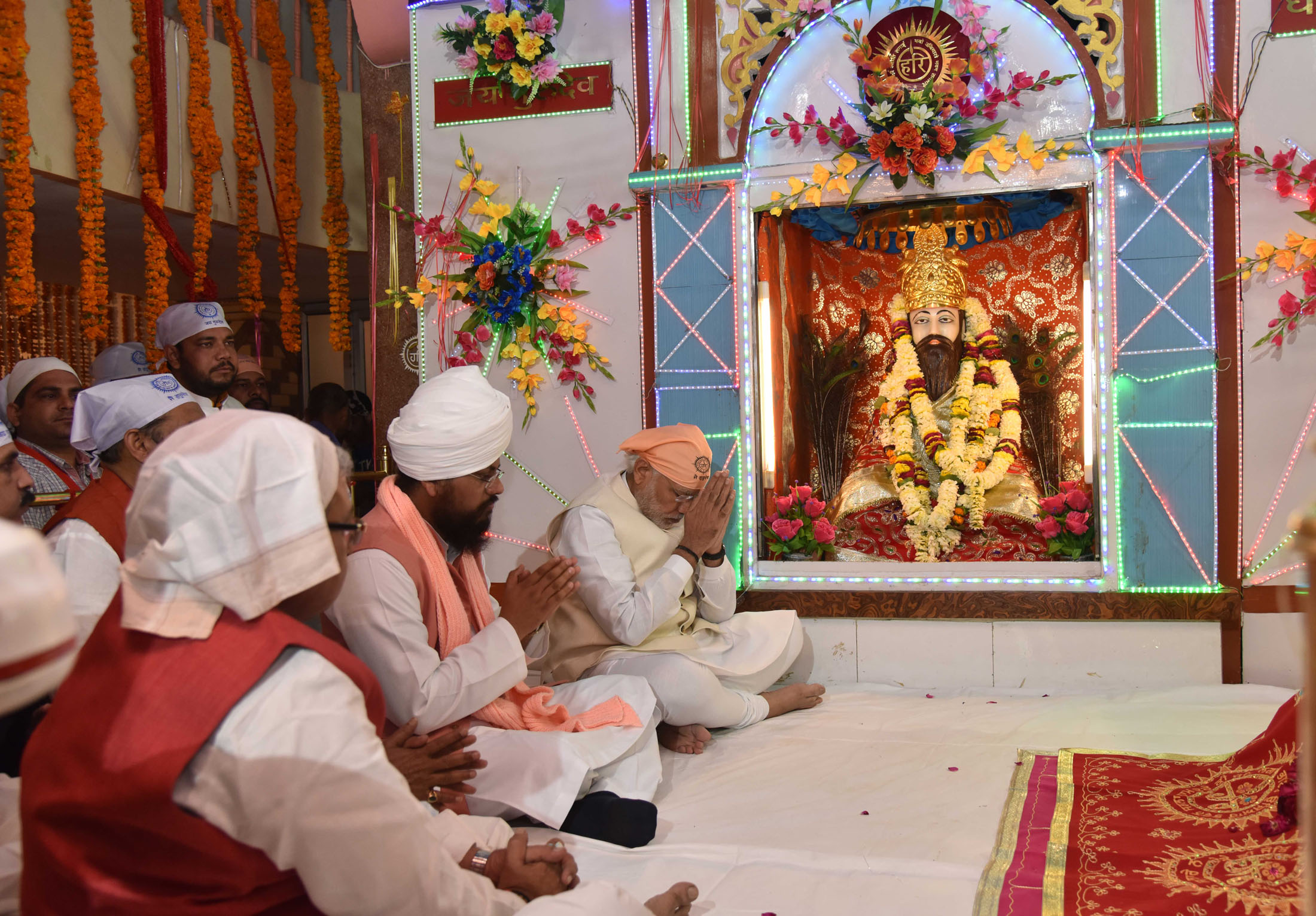
The idol of Ravidas in the sanctum of Shri Guru Ravidas Janmsthan Mandir in Varanasi, marking his birthplace. The Ravidassia group separated from Sikhism into a separate religion in 2009.

The political alignments since the independence of India in 1947 have led to political leaders wooing lower caste vote-banks that led to carving out a new sect called Ravidassia religion in 2009. The foundation of the Ravidassia religion worried Sikhs the most, as Sikhism itself emerged in the 15th century to break caste and religious distinctions. The adherents of Ravidassia have continued to follow Guru Granth Sahib while retaining some historical Sikh symbols such as the nishan sahib and langar.

Ravidassias believe that Ravidas is their Guru (saint) whereas Sikhs consider him one of the bhagats (holy person) who is revered in the Sikh faith. Ravidassias have attempted to create a separate lineage by appointing head preachers of Ravidass Deras as Guru whereas the Sikhs do not, states Ronki Ram. The Sikh sub-tradition decisively split from Sikhism following an assassination attack on their visiting living Guru Sant Niranjan Dass and his deputy Ramanand Dass in 2009 in Vienna, which was attributed to Sikhs. Ramanand Dass died from the attack, Niranjan Dass survived his injuries, while over a dozen attendees at the temple were also injured.

In the 1970s, Western people – mainly North American Caucasians, Hispanics, African Americans and Europeans – led by Harbhajan Singh Khalsa, also known as Yogi Bhajan, began converting to Sikhism. They called their movement Sikh Dharma Brotherhood or 3HO (Healthy, Happy, Holy Organization). They accepted the Guru Granth Sahib as their scripture, underwent the rituals of Khalsa initiation, visited Amritsar, and adopted the dress (turban) and codes of Sikhs. Harbhajan Singh Khalsa was formally anointed the Religious leader (Jathedar) of Sikhism in the West by the Sikh religious body of Akal Takht, one of five takhts (seats of power), in the 1980s. While it was embraced by some Sikh leaders, some Sikhs were suspicious of his methods. The criticism emanates from the yogic practices of the group as cited by Trilochan Singh, who has criticized it as "absurd and sacrilegious", citing the flamboyant titles Yogi claimed for himself, and incorporation of tantric yoga practices, as they were "never known in Sikh history, and were repulsive to the mind of every knowledgeable Sikh".

A similar conflict in the 1970s between the Sikhs and the Sant Nirankari sect, a 20th-century offshoot of the Nirankari tradition, led to accusations by some Sikhs that the Sant Nirankaris were heretical and sacrilegious. Contrary to mainstream Sikhism, the Sant Nirankari leader had declared himself a guru with his own scripture in the presence of the Guru Granth Sahib, and added heretical variations of several Sikh rituals and symbols, including replacing the Sikh institution of the Panj Pyare council with the sat sitare, and replacing amrit, a mixture of mixed sugar and water administered to Khalsa initiates, with charan amrit, water used to wash his feet. They were also accused of unprovoked criticism of the Gurus and Sikh scripture, as the Sant Nirankari leader had written in his own scripture that he alone, of all religions' prophets, had agreed to go back to Earth to spread God's true message, with the understanding that God agreed that anyone who was blessed by him would go to heaven regardless of their deeds, and that analysis of the Guru Granth Sahib had fruitless, using the metaphor of churning butter yielding no cream, and of being funded by the government and economic elites to undermine the community.

While listing the daily duties of a Sikh, early rahitnamas in Sikhism warned that they must shun panj mel (five groups). These include the Ramraiyas, the Minas, the Masands (corrupted tithe collectors), the Dhirmalias, the Sir-gums (Sikhs who accept Amrit baptism but subsequently break it and cut their hair).

== Academia ==
A few Sikh groups have put pressure on universities to stifle academic criticism of popular Sikh literature and theories of Sikh history. In the early 1990s, Pashaura Singh, an academic of the Macleodian school, was campaigned against for challenging the authenticity of Guru Granth Sahib. Singh was pressured to withdraw sections of his thesis. The Akal Takht issued a statement that Pashaura Singh was afforded due opportunity by the Akal Rakhta and other Sikh scholars on his comparative method (borrowed from Trumpp) and his hypothesis of the draft theory was rejected as forcibly injecting undated texts dated much beyond the timeline of the Adi Granth. Another academic also praised by MacLeod, Harjot Oberoi, was also campaigned against for his removal by parties which denounced his methodology towards the study of Sikhism.

According to the Indologist Mark Juergensmeyer, the largest group of scholars dedicated to Sikh Studies are based in and near Punjab, but these scholars project themselves as proud Sikhs and predominantly focus on showing distinctiveness of their faith rather than examine the connections and similarities of Sikhism to other religious traditions based on comparative studies of texts and manuscripts. Sikh writers criticize methodologies to "coldly dissect" their personal faith and Sikh history by "methods of social science" and by critical comparative textual or literary analysis. This, critiques Juergensmeyer, has set the stage for an "unhappy confrontation" between the academic scholars versus those motivated in defending the dignity of their faith, including publications by Sikh institutions that are hostile to W. H. McLeod and other scholars who are based outside India, and as Juergensmeyer states, some conservative Sikh scholars have made important contributions to the scholarship of Sikhism by discovering old Sikh manuscripts and publishing their analysis.

== See also ==
- 2015 Guru Granth Sahib desecration controversy
