= Lal Singh Musawir =

Lal Singh Musawir, also known as Thakur Lal Singh, was a Sikh artist and photographer active in the late 19th and early 20th century. Very little is known about his life. He was a court-painter for Nabha State under Tikka Ripudaman Singh and also assisted Max Arthur MacAuliffe in his magnum opus, The Sikh Religion (1909), by drawing its illustrations. A passage in the text states the following:

There are also added pictures of the gurus as far as ascertainable, of famous Sikh temples, and of some scenes memorable in Sikh history. These pictures have been prepared by Bhai Lal Singh under the auspices of the Honourable Tikka (heir apparent) Ripudaman Singh, the young heir to the Nabha gadi (throne).

— Max Arthur Macauliffe, The Sikh Religion (1909)

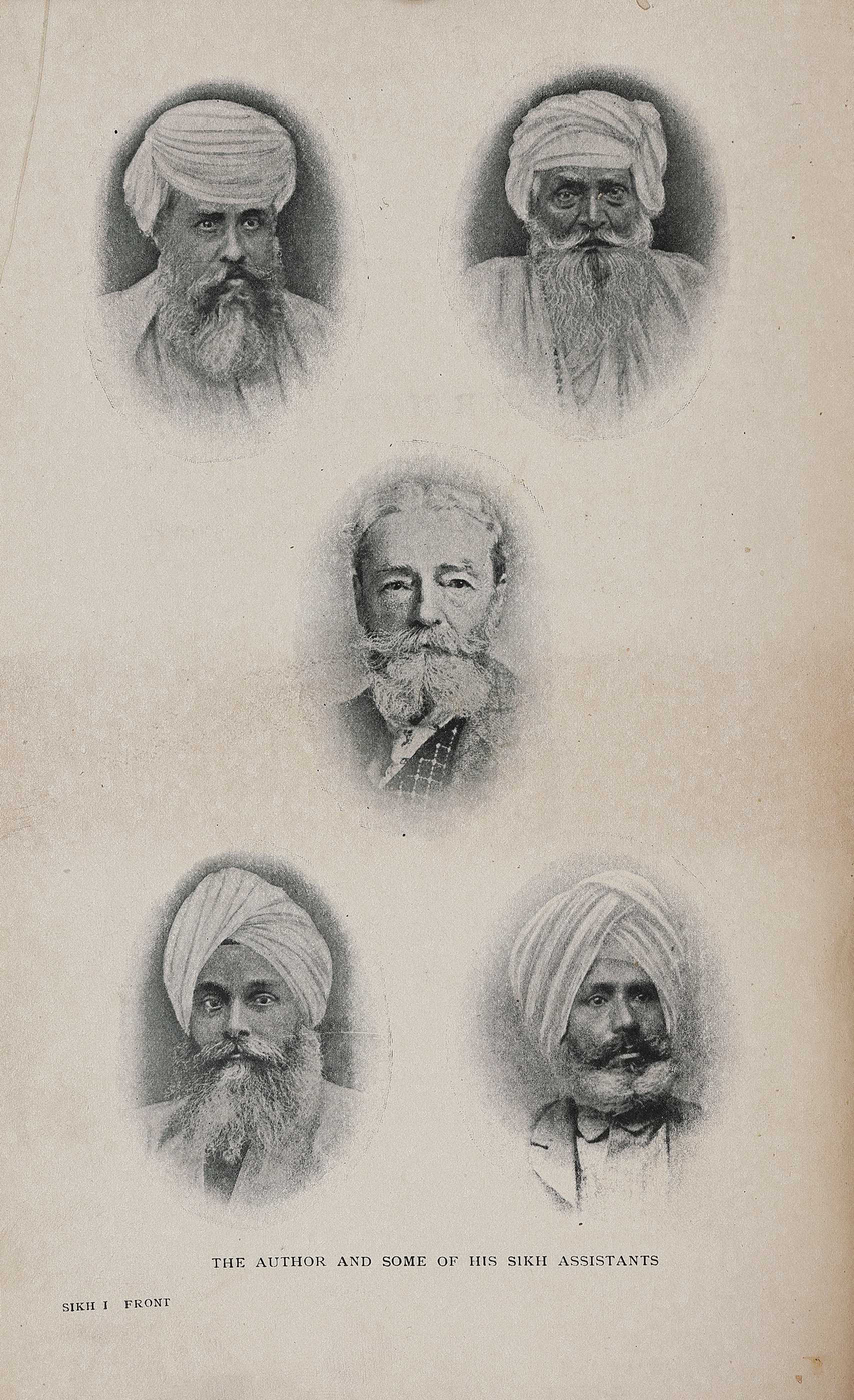
Illustration of the author and some of his Sikh assistants, by Lal Singh Musawir, published in 'The Sikh Religion' (1909)

He was initially trained as a miniaturist but later delved into photography, as Nabha State showed early interest in the technology. In 1903, he snapped photographs of Raja Hira Singh, Lord Curzon, and other British officials at the Delhi Durbar the same year. One specialty of his was painted-photographs, especially of Hira Singh. There remains photographs, drawings, sketches, and paintings attributable to him. He operated a photographic-studio in Jalandhar Cantonment.

== Scholarly analysis ==
W. H. McLeod gave a negative review of Lal Singh's work, describing it as "neat, clear and lifeless". Bob van der Linden states that McLeod's condescending opinion was based on his preference for an untainted Sikh artistic tradition not influenced by foreign elements, with Lal Singh's European-influenced works being distasteful as a result. R. P. Srivastava believes that Lal Singh held the Thakur title rather than Bhai and compliments his works. His portraits of the Sikh gurus within The Sikh Religion align with common motifs associated with each of the ten gurus, which makes the gurus easily identifiable. Certain depictions of decorated curtains in the background of his illustrations reveal he may have been familiar with studio-photography.

== Gallery ==
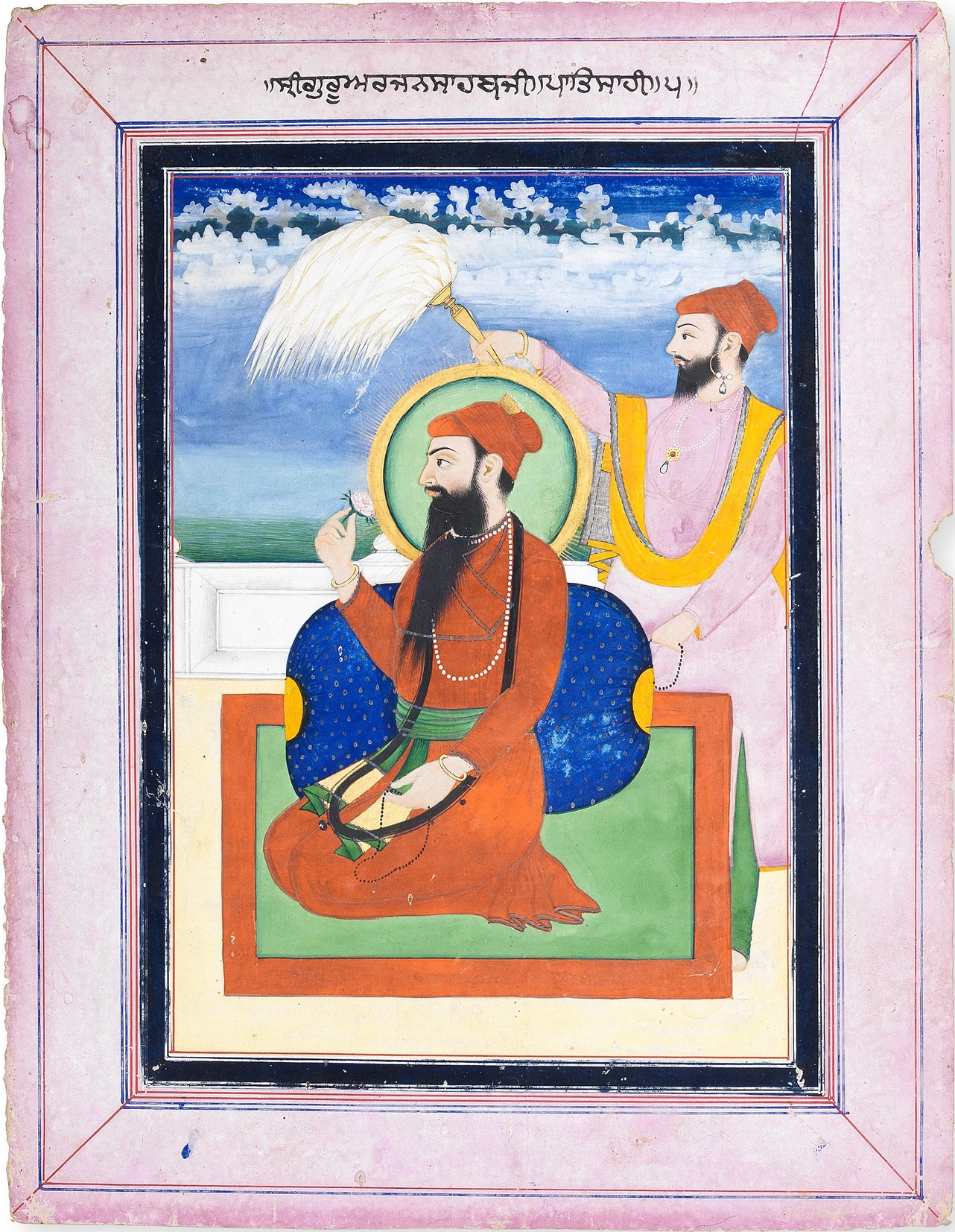
Guru Arjan seated on a terrace holding a flower, with an attendant holding a flywhisk, by Lal Singh Musavvir

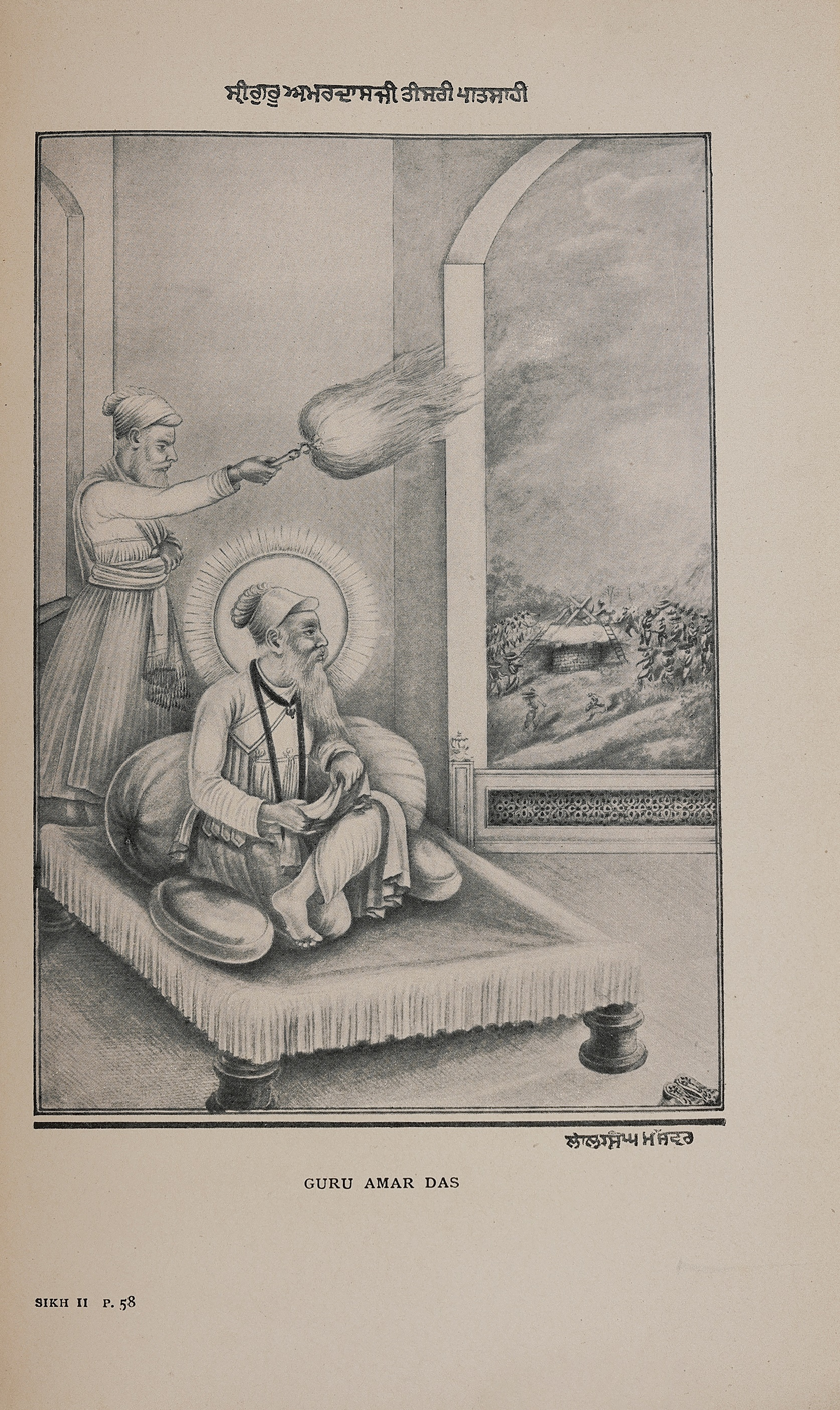
Illustration of Guru Amar Das, by Lal Singh Musawir, published in 'The Sikh Religion' (1909)

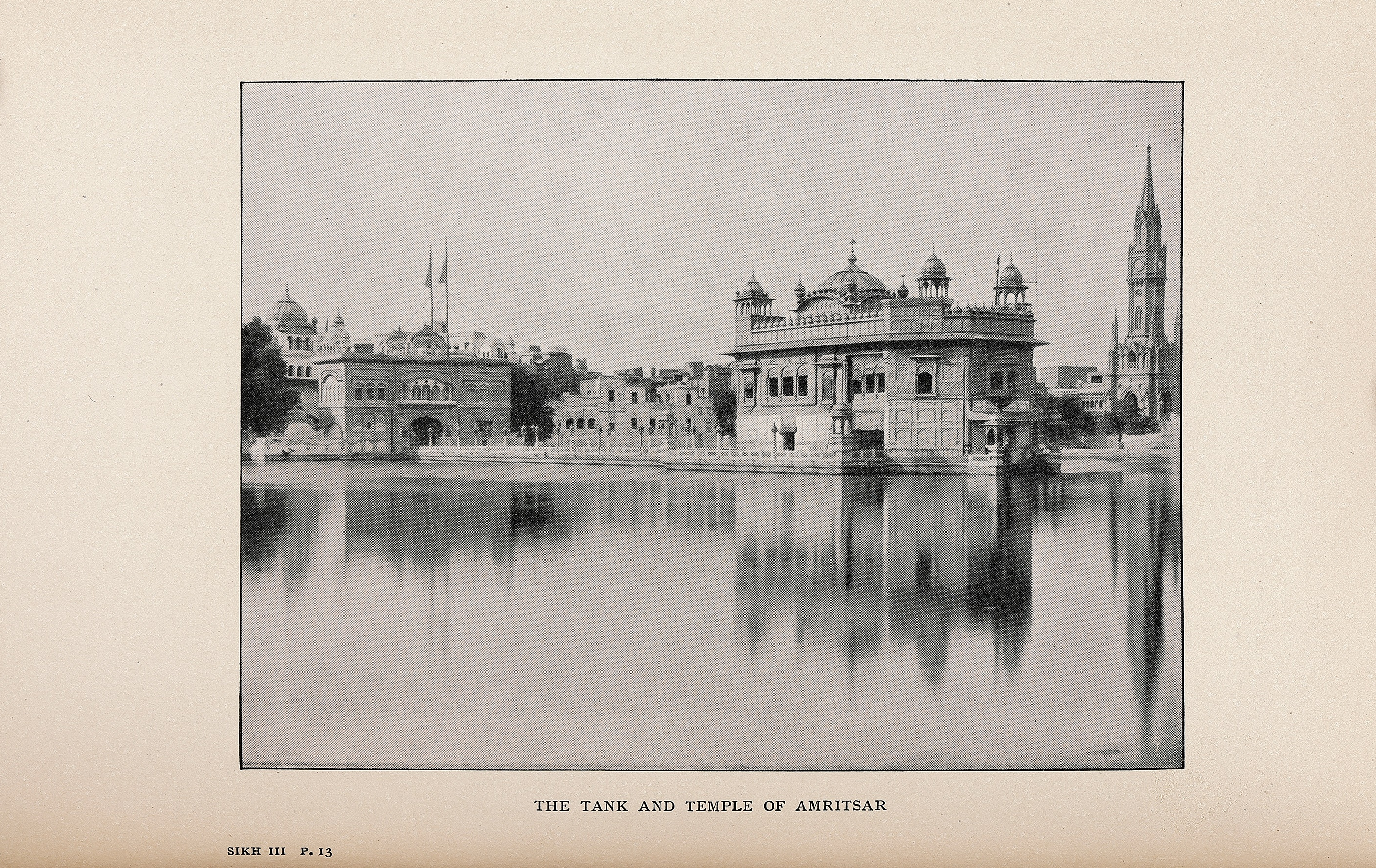
Photograph of the tank and temple of the Golden Temple complex in Amritsar, by Lal Singh Musawir, published in 'The Sikh Religion' (1909)

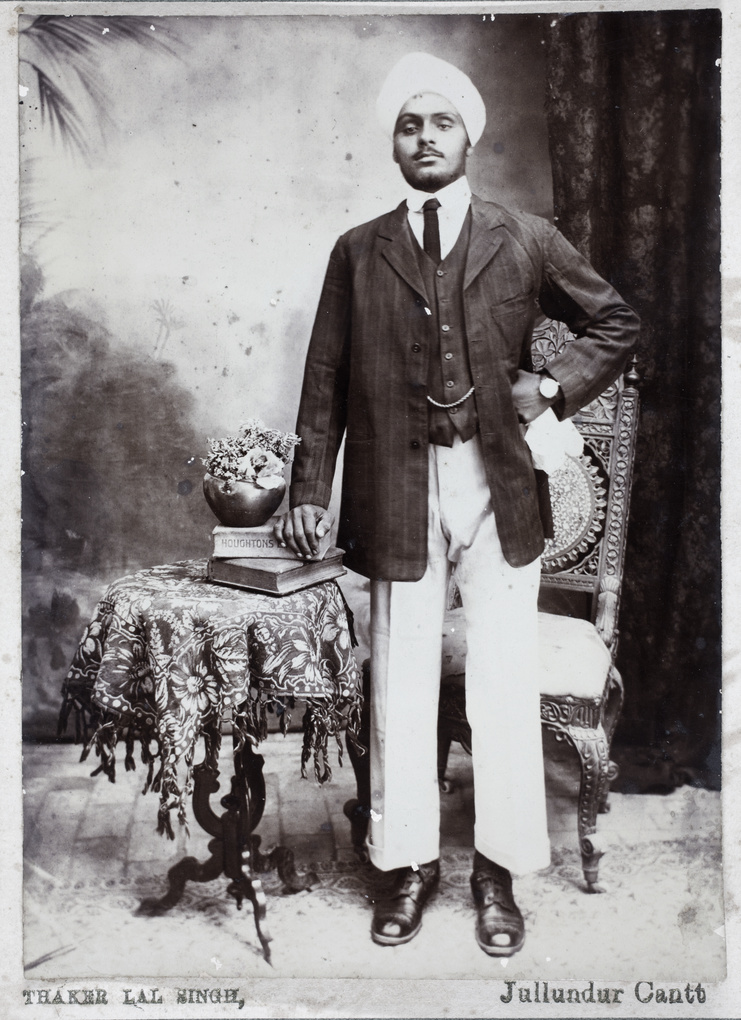
Photograph of Kartar Singh Sangha, by Thakur Lal Singh, Jalandhar Cantonment, Punjab, ca.1919–20
