= Devinder =

Devinder may refer to:

- Devinder Gupta (1943–2024), Indian judge
- Devinder Pal Singh Bhullar (born 1965), Sikh activist
- Devinder Ahuja, former badminton player
- Devinder Kumar Manyal (born 1969), Indian politician
- Bir Devinder Singh (1949/1950 – 2023), Indian politician
- Devinder Shory (born 1958), Canadian politician
- Devinder Toor, Canadian politician
- Devinder Singh Garcha (born 1932) is an Indian politician
- Devinder Singh (born 1952) is a former Indian hockey player
- Devinder Sharma (born 1950) is a former Indian cricket umpire
- Devinder Gill, Indian actor and model
- Devinder Kumar Sehrawat, retired colonel of the Indian Armed Forces and a politician

== See also ==
- Gurinder
