= Gurjinder Singh =

Gurjinder Singh may refer to:

- Gurjinder Singh (footballer, born 1987), Indian footballer
- Gurjinder Singh (footballer, born 1997), Greek footballer
- Gurjinder Singh (field hockey) (born 1994), Indian field hockey player

== See also ==
- Gurvinder Singh (disambiguation)
- Gurinder Singh (disambiguation)
- Gurwinder Singh
