= Max Arthur Macauliffe =

British administrator, prolific scholar and author

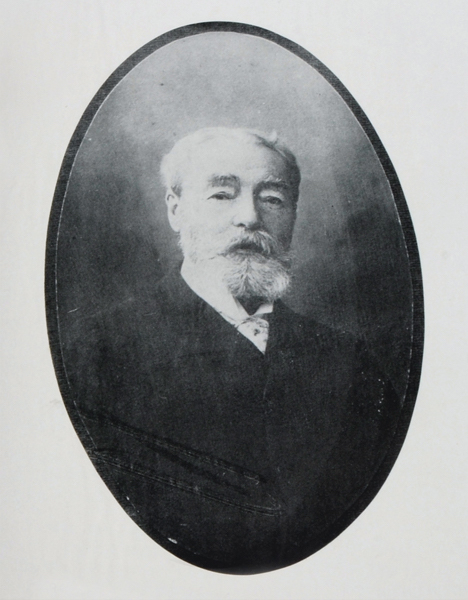
- Born: Michael McAuliffe; 11 September 1838; Glenmore, Monagea, County Limerick, Ireland
- Died: 15 March 1913 (aged 74); West Kensington, London United Kingdom
- Known for: English translator of the Sikh scriptures and historian of Sikhism; Prominent scholar of Sikhism

Max Arthur Macauliffe (11 September 1838 − 15 March 1913), originally known as Michael McAuliffe, was a senior Irish administrator, writer, translator and prolific scholar in British India. Macauliffe is renowned for his partial translation of the Sikh scripture, Guru Granth Sahib, and Sikh history into English. His magnum opus was The Sikh Religion: Its Gurus, Sacred Writings and Authors, published in 1909 by the Clarendon Press. He was skilled at languages, being proficient in a number of them. He is regarded as one of the most influential Western scholars on Sikhism.

== Name ==
His birth or baptismal name was Michael McAuliffe, which he changed to Michael Macauliffe in the 1870s and finally to Max Arthur Macauliffe after 1909. He may have changed his name to Max in honour of the famous scholar Friedrich Max Müller, who praised his work, or to escape the scandals he is believed to have been involved in.

== Early life and education ==
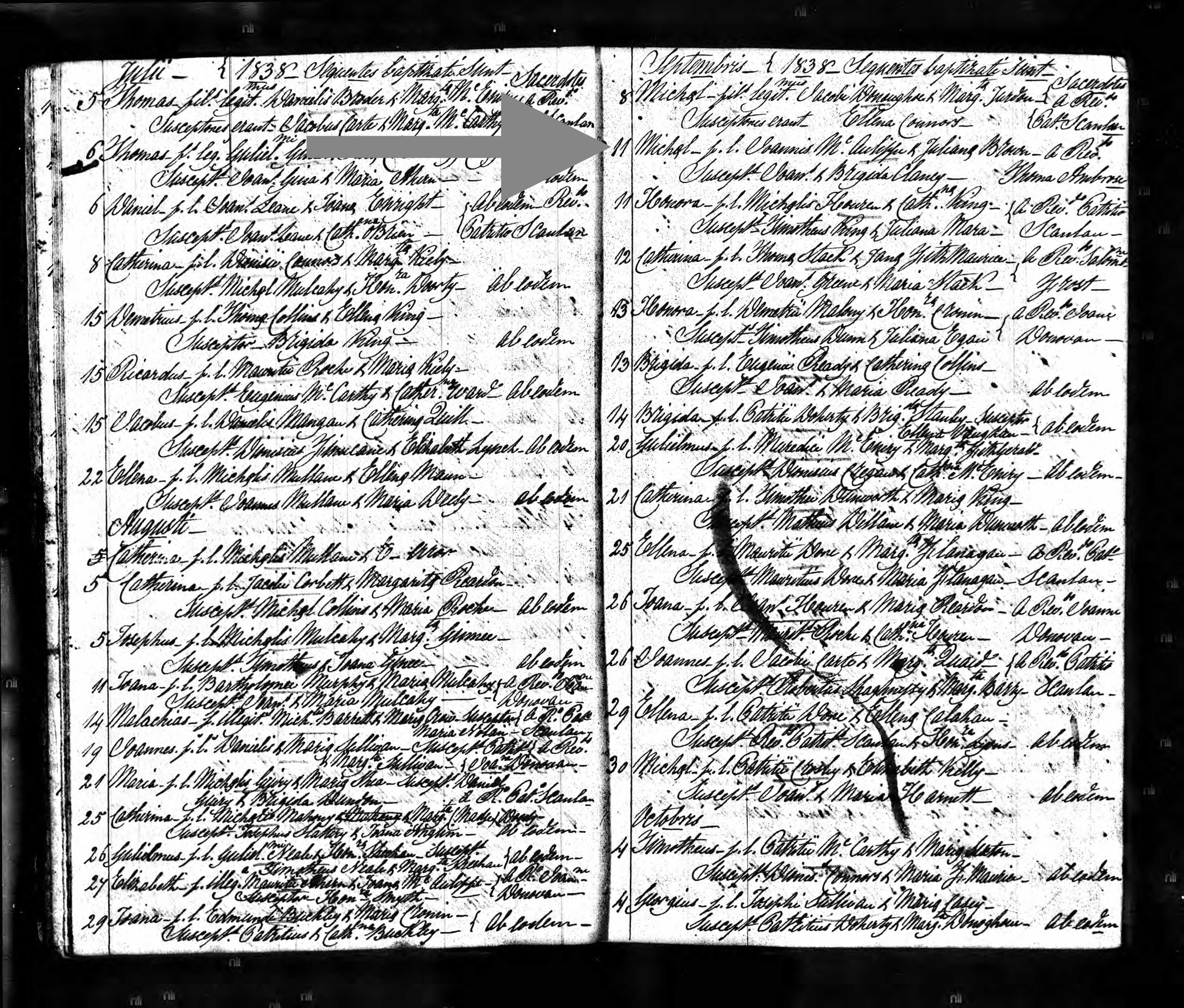
Birth record of the Irish scholar of Sikhism, Max Arthur Macauliffe (born Michael McAuliffe), Monagea, Ireland, September 1838

Macauliffe was born in Ireland at Glenmore, Monagea, Newcastle West, County Limerick on 11 September 1838 (although some sources incorrectly claim he was born in 1841) into a Roman Catholic family to parents John McAuliffe and Julia Browne. He was baptised as a Roman Catholic and was the eldest of a family of eleven or twelve children, with the family shifting from Monagea to Templeglantine where his father John became headmaster at a local school. According to Tadhg Foley, the family consisted of five sons and seven daughters, with Michael being the oldest. He was educated at Newcastle School, Limerick, and Springfield College. He attended Queen's College Galway between 1857 and 1863, being awarded junior scholarships in the Literary Division of the Arts Faculty for 1857–58, 1858–59, and 1859–60. He was awarded a B.A. degree with first class honours in Modern Languages in 1860. He obtained a senior scholarship in Ancient Classics for 1860–1, and a senior scholarship in Modern Languages and History for 1861–62. He also served as Secretary of the college's Literary and Debating Society for the 1860–61 school year. He studied ancient classics, modern languages, and modern history. His education afforded him some proficiency in Latin, Greek, French, and Italian.

== Civil service ==
Macauliffe entered the Indian Civil Service of the British Raj in 1862 after passing an examination in London in June 1862, picking this career as it paid well and would provide a pension. He arrived in Calcutta on 9 February 1864, staying there for a year or two, probably to obtain qualifications in Urdu and Bengali at Fort William College. Macauliffe originally aimed to work in Bengal but decided instead to go to Punjab following a discussion about climate and salary with a civil servant who served in Punjab. He arrived in Punjab around 1865 and had to sit further tests in Urdu and Persian. He first worked as an Assistant Commissioner and later as a Judicial Commissioner. From 1865 or 1866, he worked in Gurdaspur as an Assistant Commissioner (third class) until 1870; then he worked until 1872 in Multan as an Assistant Commissioner (possibly second class). Between 1872 and 1874 he was in Britain, but returned to Punjab, working from 1875 to 1878 in Montgomery as an Assistant Commissioner (either second or first class), after which he was appointed as a Judicial Assistant (first grade). In 1878, he again returned to Britain. He was appointed Deputy Commissioner of the Punjab in 1882 and Divisional Judge in 1884, continuing to work in this role until 1893. He was awarded the degree of M.A. (honoris causa) by his alma mater in 1882. He retired from the Indian Civil Service in 1893 after the Khalsa Diwan offered him money for his work on Sikhism, receiving a pension thereafter. E. D. Maclagan, writing in 1908, criticized Macauliffe for characterizing his retirement from the civil service as a "resignation". He lived in Amritsar for around three years after his retirement, in a house located on 2 Cantonment Road. He had lost around a lakh (100,000) rupees around this time due to commercial failures.

== Research on Sikhism ==
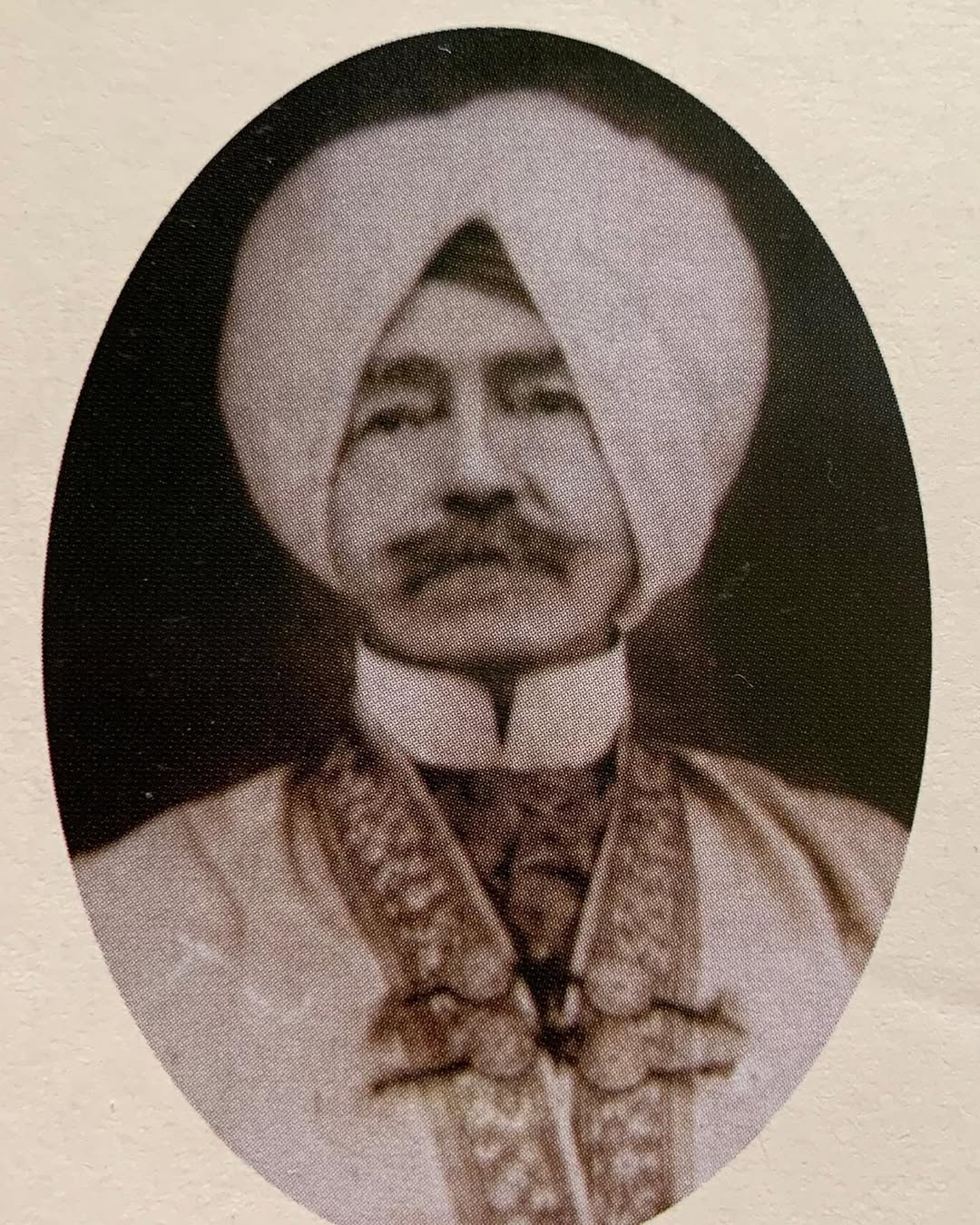
Portrait of Max Arthur Macauliffe wearing a turban

Macauliffe's interest in the Sikhs began after he attended a Diwali celebration in Amritsar shortly after he arrived in Punjab. What interested him was their egalitarianism in regards to women and caste, their martialness and modernism, and their lack of a clergy class. However, he considered Hinduism to be polluting Sikhism and wished to reform the Sikhs to rid them of Hindu influences, comparing Hinduism to a boa-constrictor hunting prey. Desiring to make Sikhism more known to the Western world, he said:

I am not without hope that when enlightened nations become acquainted with the merits of the Sikh religion, they will not willingly let it perish in the great abyss in which so many creeds have been engulfed.

— Max Arthur Macauliffe

In his career as a civil servant, Macauliffe showed sympathy with the native Sikhs, which brought him into some conflict with his British peers, the colonial government refusing to financially support his Sikh research. He may have been introduced to Sikh studies by Bhai Gurmukh Singh, a Sikh reformer and scholar he may have met between 1879 and 1884. Macauliffe worked with other contemporary Sikh scholars and writers, such as Attar Singh of Bhadaur, Kahn Singh of Nabha (who became one of his closest Sikh assistants after they first met in 1885), Bhagat Lakhsman Singh, and Ernest Trumpp. Macauliffe also knew Gottlieb Wilhelm Leitner from 1870, with them meeting in 1885, 1886, and 1899. Macauliffe's first four articles on Sikhism were published in the Calcutta Review between 1875 and 1881. Eventually, he accepted the fact that he could not fully delve into Sikh studies without leaving his job in the civil service. After he retired from the Indian Civil Service in 1893, he had more time to devote to Sikh translations and history.

Macauliffe was concerned that the original essence of the Sikh religion was being lost due to the onset of linguistic shift, elderly traditional Sikh teachers and interpreters not passing on their knowledge to the next generation, religious syncretism, modernity, and technology; thus he rushed to record what remained. Traditionally, Sikh expositions were carried out by the Gianis, Udasis, and Nirmalas but there was a dearth of published works covering the subject. Sikhs were guarded about their scriptures and the idea of non-Sikhs writing about them, especially due to the offence caused by Ernest Trumpp's work which was poorly received by Sikh scholars and seen as tainted by odium theologicum, an undue emphasis on Sanskrit, and his smoking of tobacco in the presence of the Sikh scripture. Sikh knowledge was traditionally passed down orally rather than through writing. The scripture was written in various linguistic sources, with no dictionary for the most part being available to assist with comprehension. The Raja of Faridkot, Bikram Singh, started a project in 1877 to publish a commentary on the Sikh scripture.

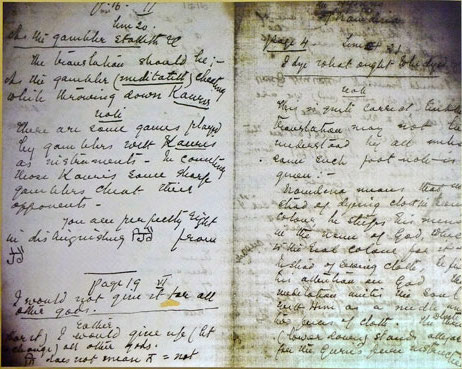
Sample of Macauliffe's handwriting, from the Amarjit Singh Chandan Collection

Macauliffe was proficient in a number of Asian languages, such as Sanskrit, Prakrit, Arabic, Persian, Turkic, Marathi, Gujarati, and Punjabi and its dialects. He would travel from Amritsar to various settlements, such as Nabha, Mussoorie, and Dehradun. His local patrons included Hira Singh of Nabha, Ripudaman Singh of Nabha, Rajinder Singh of Patiala, Ranbir Singh of Jind, Ranjit Singh of Chhachhrauli, and Sayajirao Gaekwad III of Baroda. He consulted the earlier works of Henry Colebrooke, John Malcolm, Joseph Davey Cunningham, Horace Hayman Wilson, Monier Williams, Friedrich Max Muller, and Ernest Trumpp. Macauliffe criticized Trumpp's earlier translations for not taking into account traditional Sikh interpretations, instead relying on Sanskritic interpretations, and he felt they were unsuitably rendered in English. Macauliffe relied on a number of native Sikh scholars, bhais and gianis. These included Kahn Singh of Nabha, Nihal Singh of Sialkot, Sant Singh of Sialkot, Ditt Singh, Gurmukh Singh, Rajindar Singh of Lahore, Nihal Singh of Lahore, Sardul Singh Giani, Prem Singh, Fateh Singh of Amritsar, Darbara Singh of Amritsar, Bhai Sant Singh of Kapurthala, Bhai Bhagwan Singh of Patiala, and Bhai Dasaundha Singh of Firozpur. These Sikhs did not always agree with one another, lacked English ability, and communicated in dialectal Punjabi, making Macauliffe's task more challenging. Macauliffe had difficulty locating Sikhs who were conversant in English but also possessed advanced knowledge in the scripture; he claimed there were only ten such men in the world and they all failed to interpret the Sikh scriptures in English without resorting to native language. He was distrustful regarding the accuracy of some of the information imparted to him by learned Sikhs. Some Sikhs considered an English translation of the Sikh scripture to be blasphemous and asserted that they would lobby for a government ban if such a translation was published. Macauliffe argued that the Sikh gurus and Bhagats, if they were alive, would be pleased to see their verses being translated into English and made more accessible to the world. By Christmas Day in 1899, he was in debt to the amount of 35,000 rupees due to employing Sikh teachers.

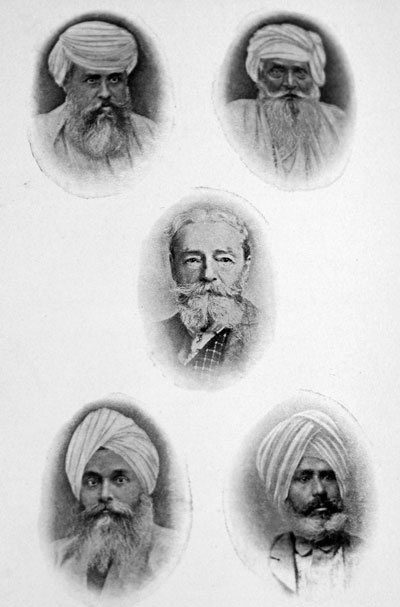
Frontispiece of 'The Sikh Religion' (1909), depicting Macauliffe with some of his Sikh assistants (Kahn Singh in bottom-left and Ditt Singh in bottom-right), by Lal Singh Mussawir

In 1897, he gave a lecture in Paris, which led to an 1898 book on Sikhism. At a lecture at the annual session of the Lahore Singh Sabha, Macauliffe proclaimed that the Guru Granth Sahib was matchless as a book of holy teachings. He stated: "the sublimity of their [Sikh gurus] style and the high standard of ethics which they inculcated were unmatched". However, Macauliffe claimed that only around fifty learnt Sikhs remained in Punjab who could properly interpret the scriptures. While Macauliffe is connected to the Tat Khalsa, in reality he worked with and maintained ties with both the Sanatan Sikhs and Tat Khalsa. However, Macauliffe had a partial falling out with the Sikhs after not receiving payment for his English translation by the reformers and maharajas, despite being promised this by Gurmukh Singh. Also Macauliffe wanted to maintain friendly relations with the Amritsar Singh Sabha, which was opposed by the Lahore Singh Sabha. By 1897, Macauliffe had written to the government warning them of Gurmukh Singh, who was his competitor, and both vied for the patronage of the Patiala ruler. In 1902, the work that Macauliffe had done regarding Sikhs was praised by the philologist Max Müller in his book Auld Lang Syne, Second Series.

=== Translation work ===
Macauliffe is held in high esteem by the Sikh community for his translation into English of major parts of the Sikh scripture under the review of native Sikh scholars, titled The Sikh Religion: Its Gurus, Sacred Writings and Authors (six volumes, Clarendon Press, 1909), running to nearly 2,500 pages in length. Macauliffe is reported to have used 200,000 rupees of his own funds to support the work. He was assisted by Pratap Singh Giani, a Sikh scholar. The work is a translation of select portions of the scripture, combined with traditional narratives and stories involving the Sikh gurus and bhagats. Altogether he dedicated sixteen years to his Sikh translations with little resources to support him. A major portion of the Guru Granth Sahib was therefore translated by him. He would later state:

Had I known earlier the difficulties I should have to encounter, I should certainly never have undertaken a translation of this description.

— Max Arthur Macauliffe, Asiatic Quarterly Review, 1898, p.365

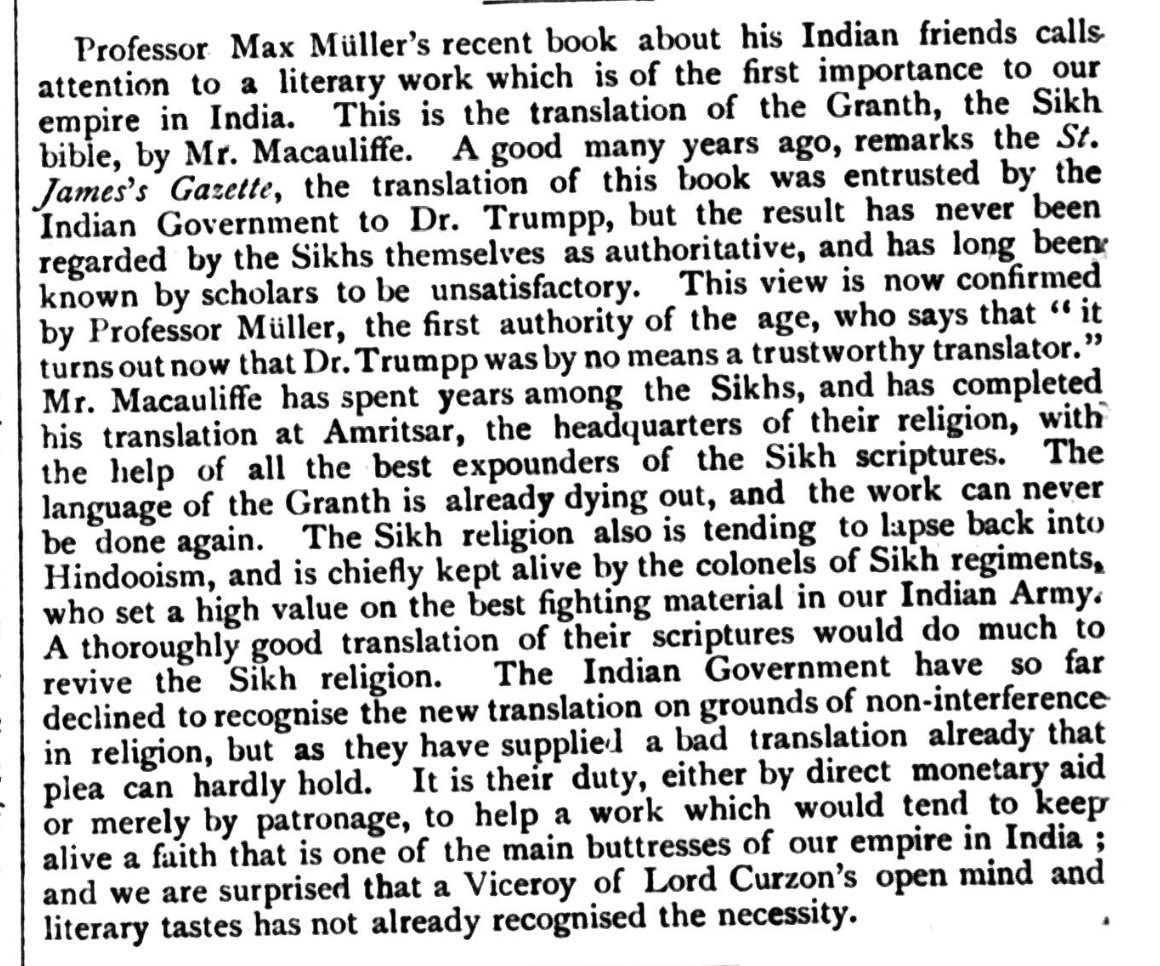
Newspaper article covering Max Arthur Macauliffe's work translating Sikh scripture, published in the Homeward Mail from India, China and the East, Monday 2 October 1899

In 1885, he requested the Maharaja of Nabha to let Kahn Singh of Nabha (who knew English) assist him with his research on Sikh scriptures, and the Nabha ruler permitted this. Kahn Singh and Macauliffe would work together for the following decades, beginning at Rawalpindi. Kahn Singh was influential in his view that Sikhs were distinct from Hindus. On 3 May 1893, the Ferozepur Singh Sabha and Lahore Khalsa Diwan jointly requested Macauliffe to translate the Guru Granth Sahib to English. The Amritsar Singh Sabha sent a letter to Macauliffe stated the following:

We desire, now that you have become thoroughly acquainted with our customs, our sacred books, and the tenets of our religion, that you fulfil the promise made in your Circular letter to the Sikhs, in which you stated that you would write nothing prejudicial to their religion. In the lives of the Gurus which you are going to write, we desire you to consult the Gur Bilas, the Suraj Prakash, and such other works as have been compiled from ancient writings, not corrupted by the Handalis, the followers of Kabir, and the poets who infused foreign elements into our religion.

— Singh Sabha of Amritsar, (Macauliffe 1909, Vol. 1, xiii-xiv.)

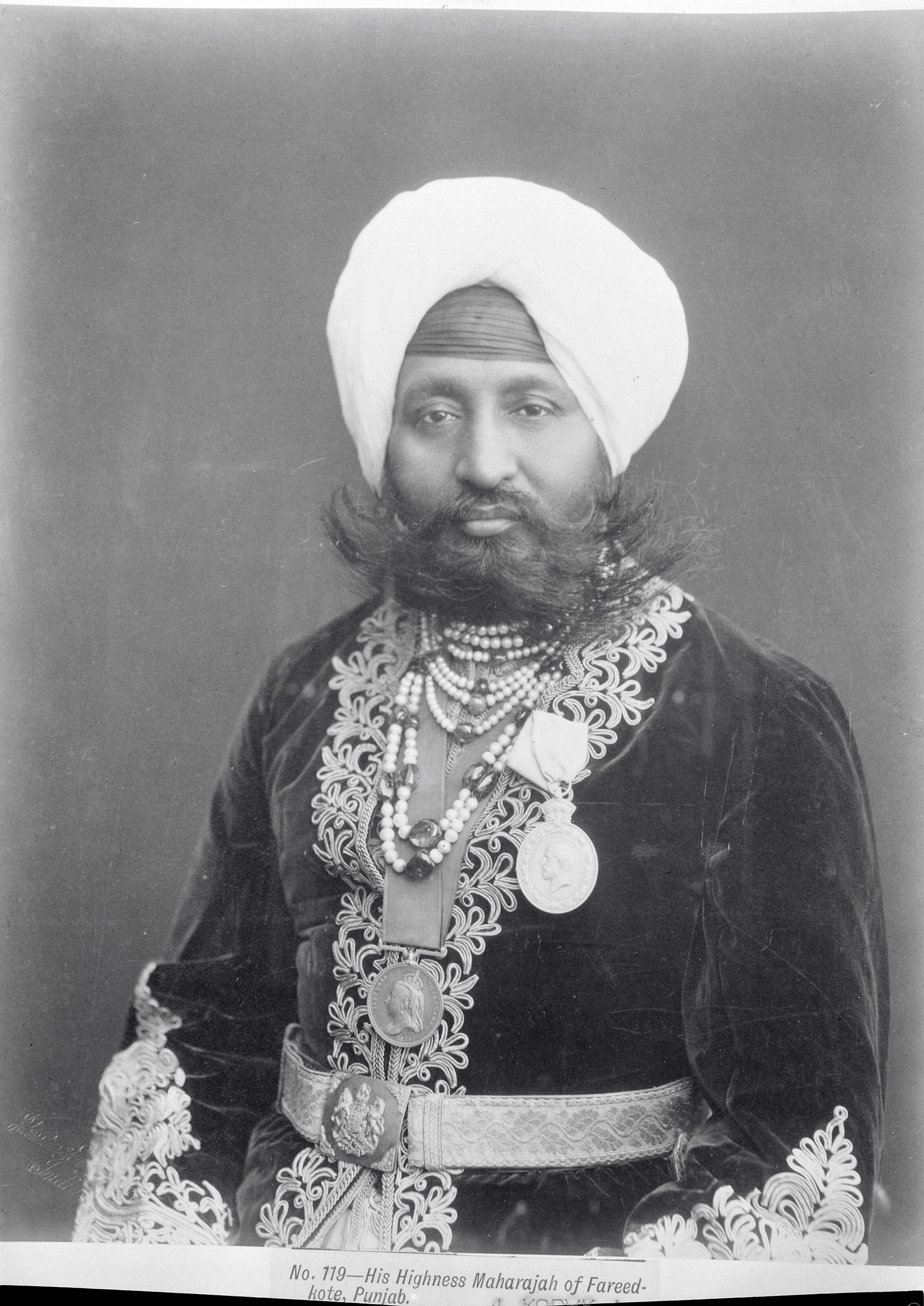
Raja Bikram Singh of Faridkot, who promised Macauliffe money for his services in producing a translation

Raja Bikram Singh of Faridkot promised him the pay of six months salary he received as a divisional judge and other assistance. He would translate select portions line by line and invited a committee of Sikh scholars to review each translation. Some of the Sikhs who reviewed his work as part of the committee were Colonel Jawala Singh (superintendent of the Golden Temple and organizer of the committee), Bhagat Lakhsman Singh, Kahn Singh of Nabha, Bhai Basant Singh, Bhai Sardul Singh Giani (son of Giani Gian Singh), Bhai Sant Singh of Kapurthala, and Bhai Prem Singh of Amritsar. His Japji Sahib translation was proofread by Bhagat Lakhsman Singh and Bhagat Balmukand, with the translation later being praised by Divan Leila Ram of Hyderabad. After the translation was completed, Macauliffe was invited by the custodians of the Golden Temple complex in Amritsar to address the congregation at the Akal Takht regarding his work. Three akhand paths (recitations) were arranged for the success of the translation. Between 1901 and 1903, the work was proofread by Kahn Singh of Nabha, Diwan Lila Ram, Bhai Shankar Dayal, Bhai Hazara Singh, Bhai Sardul Singh, Bhai Ditt Singh, Bhai Bhagwan Singh among others. The Sikh committee would later issue the following certificate verifying Macauliffe's translation as faithful and accurate:

We, through the agency of learned Sikhs acquainted with English, have carefully perused the translation of the hymns of the Granth Sahib by Mr. Macauliffe. The perusal cost us a month and a half of continuous labour. Wherever any of us found what seemed to be an error we all met, discussed the passages, and either corrected it or allowed Mr. Macauliffe's translation to stand. Wherefore we now state that Mr. Macauliffe's translation has been fully revised by us, and is thoroughly correct. The greatest care has been taken in making the translation conformable to the religious tenets of the Sikhs. The translation is quite literal and done according to all grammatical and rhetorical rules.

— Committee of Sikhs reviewing Macauliffe's translation

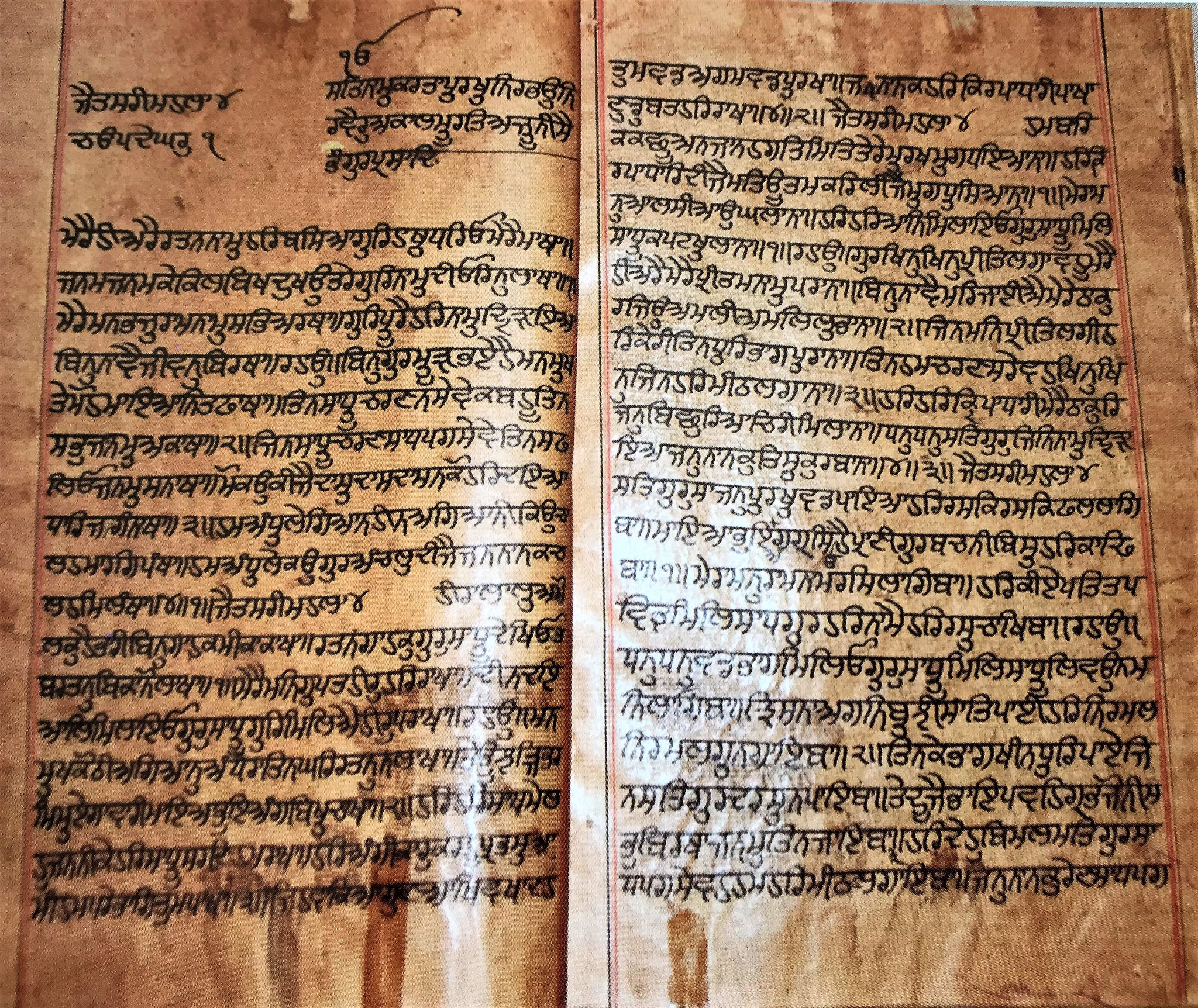
A historical manuscript of the Guru Granth Sahib from the Bhai Rupa Collection

However, there were concerns regarding the publication of the scripture's translation, from elderly and orthodox Sikhs who feared that people handling the work would not afford it the same respect traditionally given to the Guru Granth Sahib by Sikhs. Also, the traditional format and structure of the Guru Granth Sahib would not be suitable for readers not familiar with its historical context. To solve these issues, Macauliffe decided to divide the work into historical sections covering the Sikh gurus and community, interspersed with translations of select verses, with it being divided into six volumes in chronological order (except for the last volume, covering the bhagats). Specific verses were revealed in relation to particular stories or events, with short narratives being paired with translated scriptural excerpts, sometimes written in a modern but fanciful story-telling tone, rarely breached by the alternative, authoritative voice of an omniscient narrator, sometimes claiming to speak on behalf of the Sikh gurus (as in the case of Guru Gobind Singh on the topic of idolatry). Some of the historical sources he utilized were the Vaaran, Bachittar Natak, Suraj Prakash and the Gurbilases. He also used the Janamsakhis (especially the Hafizabad manuscript of the Puratan tradition), but claimed to make alternations to render their accounts more authentic and scientific. His work touches upon folk religion, such as the veneration of Sakhi Sarwar and Gugga. In January 1900, his translation of the Japji Sahib was published, followed by a translation of the Asa Di Vaar in December 1901. By 1908, the work to translate the scripture was completed. Before its publication, he and Kahn Singh went to England for the typesetting and the final proofreading.

Macauliffe advocated for years to receive official government patronage and funding for his endeavour, without success as the colonial government distanced itself from his work. Some in the Punjab colonial government thought his 1909 work deserved official patronage, although others opposed the idea on the grounds of religious neutrality. Eventually the government offered 5,000 rupees to Macauliffe (reduced from the originally planned 15,000 rupees), who rejected the money for being insignificant in amount. Affluent Sikhs were initially hesitant to support Macauliffe's work due to fears of upsetting the colonial government. The Sikh Educational Conference held in Rawalpindi in 1911 rejected a proposal to praise the 1909 work. His translations were praised by natives and foreigners alike, such as Khem Singh Bedi, Sumer Singh Bhalla, Bhai Hazara Singh Giani of Amritsar, Sunder Singh of Penang, J. A. Grierson, William Hunter, Edwin Arnold, and Max Müller. However, Macauliffe was disappointed that the work was not completed in time to be published in 1899 during the 200th anniversary celebration of the Khalsa's establishment. In 1911, he arrived at Rawalpindi to visit the Sikh Educational Conference but nobody was there to receive him at the train station, so he went to the residence of Bhagat Lakshman Singh, stating the following there:

I've declined to take government funds ... I won't ask the Sikhs for money either. I just want the Conference to pass a resolution appreciating my work and recommending that Sikhs should buy the book.

— Max Arthur Macauliffe

Macauliffe was disappointed that the Sikh Educational Conference refused to pass the resolution supporting him. He felt rejected by both the Sikhs and the British, choosing to eat alone in his hotel at Rawalpindi Cantonment. However, a majority of Sikhs continued to support his efforts.

=== Other works ===
His other works consist of articles and pamphlets. Macauliffe also contributed Sikh-related articles to the eleventh edition of the Encyclopaedia Britannica. He held scholarly discourses in India, Italy, France, and England. He may have had later plans to translate the Sikh scripture into modern/ordinary Punjabi, as hinted at by Lord Kitchener of Khartoum.

== Later life and death ==
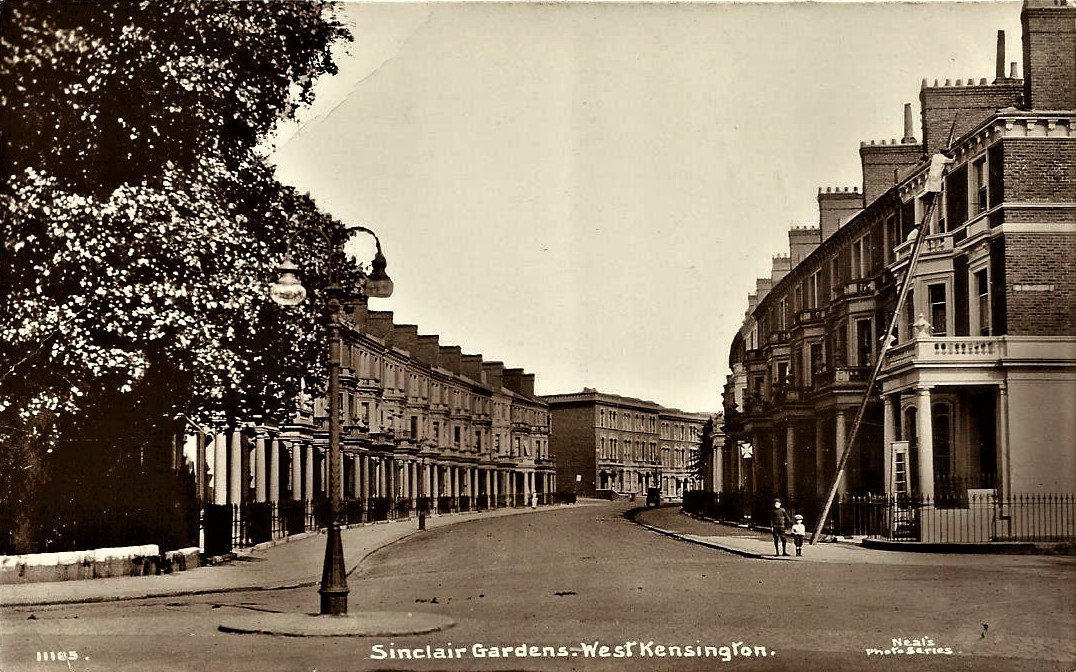
Sinclair Gardens, London, where Macauliffe spent his final years

In 1904, Macauliffe moved to London, where he was wealthy, despite McLeod identifying him as a poor man later in his life. He owned two houses at Sinclair Gardens (one he offered to Kahn Singh, who declined). Near the end of his life, Macauliffe had a Punjabi servant named Muhammad.

Macauliffe died of cancer at his home, 10 Sinclair Gardens, West Kensington, London, on 15 March 1913 as an affluent man. His personal assistant Muhammad remarked in his memoirs that on his deathbed, Macauliffe could be heard reciting the Sikh morning prayer, Japji Sahib, ten minutes before he died. After his death, his burial was refused by Christians who claimed he had apostasized, while the local Sikhs in England refused to cremate him because he was not an initiated Sikh, a keshdhari. A compromise was found and his corpse was lowered into a grave for five minutes and then cremated afterwards. He left behind a £19,000 estate for his family, while the copyright to his 1909 work The Sikh Religion was transferred to Kahn Singh of Nabha. After his death, his will was disputed by his relatives.

== Personal life and religion ==
There has been confusion regarding the nationality of Macauliffe, who was British, with some writers mistakenly referring to him as an Englishman instead of an Irishman. Macauliffe never married but he may have fathered three children (two daughters and one son) with the daughter of one of his Indian servants named Mussummat Rahiman ("Bhuri"). He was taken to court in Lahore on 17 February 1888 at the Court of the District Magistrate for maintenance payments, by her. Thus, he may have direct descendants today.

Macauliffe was raised as a Catholic, although Harbans Lal mistakenly identified him as being from a Protestant background. It is claimed that Macauliffe converted to Sikhism, and was derided by his employers for having "turned a Sikh". However, his supposed conversion to Sikhism is not agreed upon in academia. Harbans Lal claimed Macauliffe was a sehajdhari Sikh and Bhagat Lakshman Singh claimed Macauliffe died a Sikh. As per Kahn Singh, after Macauliffe's death there was controversy regarding on if he should be given a Christian burial or Sikh cremation, with a compromise being made. Tadhg Foley cautions that more conclusive evidence needs to be discovered before making assumptions on Macauliffe's religious identity. Macauliffe criticised the Kapurthala ruler for abolishing Sikhism as a state religion and abandoning a Sikh appearance.

== Views ==
Macauliffe was of the opinion that Sikhism was a distinct religion from Hinduism and that its independence was threatened by a lapse back into Hinduism. Thus, he is identified with the Tat Khalsa interpretation of Sikhism. For this view, Gandhi criticized his book in 1924:

[the book] is a life-story of the Gurus giving copious extracts from their compositions. It is a sumptuously printed publication. It loses its value because of its fulsome praise of the English rule and the author’s emphasis on Sikhism as a separate religion having nothing in common with Hinduism.

— (Gandhi 1967, 155)

Macauliffe, who was a civil servant in the British Raj, was not an anti-imperialist, and some of his writings argued that Sikhs were useful to the colonial project. Thus, Macauliffe advocated for ruling India through Indian ideas. According to him, the Sikhs should be subject to the state and the state itself had the responsibility of supporting the religion. He was critical of the colonial government's policy of religious neutrality in civil spheres, praising the colonial military for encouraging Sikhs in its ranks in Sikh regiments to become baptized into the Khalsa. Macauliffe went as far as to claim that Guru Gobind Singh prophesied that the Sikhs would be militarily united with the British. The Sikhs were imagined as an Indian version of the English, with Sikhism being compared to Protestantism as opposed to Catholicism (related to Hinduism in this conceptualization), a long-standing trend in Western historiographical writings on Sikhs since the late 18th century. Thus, Macauliffe's work bears anti-Catholic sentiments, using Sikhism as a way to celebrate Protestantism. Macauliffe stated:

In Europe and Asia all learning was in the hands of the priesthood, and this admittedly led to serious abuses in both continents. But when things are at their worst they often mend. During the very period that Wycliffe and Luther and Calvin in Europe were warning men of the errors that had crept into Christianity, men like Kabir and Guru Nanak were denouncing priestcraft and idolatry in India, and with very considerable success. Most of the medieval saints who led the crusade against superstition founded sects which still survive, but the most numerous [and] powerful of all is the great Sikh sect founded by Baba Nanak.

— (Macauliffe 1898, p. 287 and repeated, in substance, in Macauliffe 1903, p. 331)

The Sikh opposition to Muslim rulers is emphasized and Brahmins are usually portrayed in a negative manner in his work. Macauliffe was somewhat disparaging toward his early Sikh helpers for not commanding a level of English that he desired, claiming few Sikhs of an ability to meet the task of interpretation and translation could be found. In Macauliffe's view, Punjabi speakers could only assist English speakers in rendering the scriptures into English, a leadership role he reserved specifically for himself and others like him.

== Legacy ==
After Macauliffe's death, the Sikh Educational Conference issued a resolution of condolence. Local Rawalpindi Sikhs founded the Macauliffe Memorial Society and attempted to raise funds for a library, but only managed to collect 3,245 rupees, so they decided to use the money for a hypothesized Macauliffe Medal to be awarded by the University of the Punjab, Lahore, to Sikhs, but the university declined the proposal. However, Khalsa College utilized the funds and began to issue an annual medal for the best historical essay.

Some of Macauliffe's articles were later republished in Darshan Singh's work Western Image of the Sikh Religion: A Source Book.

His works are held in high-regard by both Sikh and non-Sikh scholars. His translations of Sikh works have been described as simple and direct, though his translations have also been criticized as lacking creativity due to their inhibited nature. Macauliffe and his works were foundational in the establishment of Sikhism as a world religion, as it was mostly unknown before. He also played a prominent role in the Sikh reform movement by defining and cementing Sikhism as a religion distinct from other religious traditions. His writings remain the basis for modern Sikh scholarship. Scholars Christopher Shackle and Arvind-Pal Mandair noted that his 1909 work has never been superseded and has remained in print since its original publication, being universally known in academia. It is still regarded as an accurate translation of the Sikh scripture. Mandair considers his work to be a reversal of earlier works by Trumpp. While Trumpp had been a Christian missionary to the east, Macauliffe had instead been a missionary to the west, often going to lengths to explain Sikhism using Western terminology and metaphysics to draw parallels. William Hewat McLeod critiqued Macauliffe's attempt to work a biography out of the Janamsakhis (despite him following the same general approach in his 1968 book on Guru Nanak), with McLeod believing this to be a misunderstanding of the Janamsakhis' content and purpose. Macauliffe's history of the Sikhs was written explicitly to match what was found in Sikh scripture and he rejected historical content that was not in agreement with scripture. Anne Murphy sees a lot of similarities between Macauliffe's work and traditional Sikh histories. Murphy concludes that while the work plays a significant role in the understanding of Sikh historiography, it is "enframed within a logic not derived from them and reflective of the political foundations of empire", with Macauliffe self-appointing himself as a guardian of the Sikh religion. According to Murphy, Macauliffe claimed to be the only one suited to creating such a work, as no contemporary Sikh possessed the ability, and future Sikhs would not be able to, due to the loss of knowledge over time, with Macauliffe ultimately instilling a reflection of Europe in the Sikhs by imposing Western understandings of religious boundaries and conflict. Thus, Macauliffe's admiration for Sikhism was limited by his own biases in favour of Protestantism. Tony Ballantyne states that he was the "most important western interpreter of Sikhism before W. H. McLeod". A. C. Banerjee traces the modern phase of Sikh studies to Macauliffe. Recent research by Tadhg Foley has revealed a number of false facts and myths regarding Macauliffe that have been published over the last century.

=== Amongst SIkhs ===
His memory is remembered and celebrated by Sikhs, with Tadhg Foley going as far to state: "The name of Max Arthur Macauliffe is known not only to scholars of Sikh studies but to virtually all Sikhs who are well informed about their religion". According to Harbans Singh, Macauliffe "laid the foundation of Sikh literature in English" accomplished via a "sustained and monumental labour of love". In 2013, a group of British and American Sikhs visited his final residence at 10 Sinclair Road, London, to pay respects and pray.

=== In Ireland ===
His legacy is limited in his native Ireland, with his contributions to Sikhism being mostly unknown in Ireland until recently. This may be due to Ireland after independence downplaying the role of Irish people in the British Empire, seeing it as an embarrassment rather than something to celebrate. The centennial of his death was celebrated in the United States, Canada, and Ireland in 2013, with a reissue of his work The Sikh Religion being published by Cambridge University. On 15 March 2013, a centennial conference was held in his memory at University College Cork, Ireland. A symposium in his honour was planned for 13 March 2020 at Mary Immaculate College, Limerick, but was cancelled due to Covid restrictions. In September 2019, a commemorative plaque dedicated to him was unveiled in Templeglantine, Ireland.

== Bibliography ==
- The Diwali at Amritsar (1880). First published in Calcutta Review. 70(1880), no. 140, pp. 619–36 and 71(1880), no. 142, pp. 257–72
- The Sikh Religion under Banda and Its Present Condition (1881). First published in Calcutta Review. 73(1881), pp. 155–68.
- The Rise of Amritsar and the Alterations of Sikh Religion (1881)
- The Holy Writings of the Sikhs (1898). First published in The Imperial and Asiatic Quarterly Review and Oriental and Colonial Record, 3rd series, 5(9–10), January–April, 1898, pp. 371–7; 3rd series, 6(11–12), July–October, 1898, pp. 98–109; 3rd series, 6(11–12), July–October, 1898, pp. 357–67. Also published (1900), Allahabad, Christian Association Press.
- Life and Teachings of Guru Gobind Singh (Rome: Orientalists Congress, 1899)
- Translation of the Japji (Journal of the Royal Asiatic Society of Great Britain and Ireland, January 1900)
- Macauliffe, Max Arthur (December 1901). Temple, Richard Carnac (ed.). "The Asa Di War, A Morning Prayer of the Sikhs". Indian Antiquary. XXX. Bombay: Education Society’s Press Bombay: 537–547, 557–564
- The Sikh Religion (1903). First published Simla, United Service Institution of India, Government Central Printing Office.
- A Lecture on the Sikh Religion and its Advantages to the State (1903)
- How the Sikhs Became a Militant People (1905). First published Paris, Ernest Leroux, 1905
- The Sikh Religion: Its Gurus, Sacred Writings and Authors (Oxford: Clarendon Press, 1909)
  - The Sikh Religion Vol I (1909)
  - The Sikh Religion Vol II (1909)
  - The Sikh Religion Vol III (1909)
  - The Sikh Religion Vol IV (1909)
  - The Sikh Religion Vol V (1909)
  - The Sikh Religion Vol VI (1909)
- The Holy Scriptures of the Sikhs (1910). First published Asiatic Quarterly Review, 3rd series, 29–30, October 1910.
