= Gurvinder Singh =

Gurvinder Singh may refer to:

- Gurvinder Singh (social worker) (born 1969), Indian social worker
- Gurvinder Singh (director), Indian film director.
- Gurvinder Singh (cricketer) (born 1983), Indian cricketer
- Shanky (Gurvinder Singh Malhotra, born 1991), Indian professional wrestler

== See also ==
- Gurwinder Singh (born 1986), Indian footballer
- Gurinder Singh (disambiguation)
- Gurjinder Singh (disambiguation)
