= W. H. McLeod =

New Zealand historian (1932–2009)

William Hewat McLeod
- W. H. McLeod photographed by Amarjit Singh Chandan in Kharar, Punjab, India in 1963
- Born: 2 August 1932; Feilding, New Zealand
- Died: 20 July 2009 (aged 76); Dunedin, New Zealand
- Education: School of Oriental and African Studies
- Known for: Sikh theology and history
- Spouse: Margaret Wylie (m. 1955)
- Scientific career
- Fields: Historian
- Workplaces: University of Otago, University of Toronto
- Thesis: The life and doctrine of Gurū Nānak (1965)

William Hewat McLeod (1932–2009; also Hew McLeod) was a New Zealand scholar who helped establish Sikh Studies as a distinctive field.

Considered to be the most prominent Western historian of Sikhism, his publications introduced higher criticism to Sikh sources for the first time and influenced generations of scholars. However, his scholarship remains controversial among traditional Khalsa scholars, who accuse him of disrespecting the religion and argue that Sikhism can't be studied using Western methodologies.

== Career ==
McLeod attended the Nelson College in New Zealand from 1946 to 1950, before joining the University of Otago in Dunedin, where he earned a BA. He earned an MA in history from the same college, graduating in 1955 with a 2nd Class Honours. McLeod enrolled for theological studies at the Knox College and in 1958, joined the New Zealand Presbyterian Church, apparently out of a desire to serve the less privileged. McLeod was deputed to the church's mission in Kharar in Punjab, India, where he taught English at a higher secondary school.

W. H. McLeod in-conversation with a Nihang at the Golden Temple, Amritsar, Punjab, India, taken by Amarjit Singh Chandan, 1963

During this stay, McLeod learned vernacular languages (Hindi and Punjabi) and became interested in Sikhs. In 1963, he enrolled for a PhD at the School of Oriental and African Studies in London under Arthur Llewellyn Basham and returned to India two years later upon a successful completion. He was appointed as a lecturer in Punjab History at the Baring Union Christian College in Punjab the same year. In 1968, The Clarendon Press published his thesis, establishing his reputation as a scholar and marking the beginning of his research career.

In 1969, he left his job in India (and the Presbyterian Church, with a new-found atheism). From 1969 to 1970, he was the Smuts Memorial Fellow for Commonwealth Studies at the University of Cambridge, and from 1970 to 1971, the Leverhulme Visiting Fellow for Precolonial History at the University of Sussex. In 1971 he returned to New Zealand and became a lecturer of history at the University of Otago. He would hold the post until 1997.

W. H. McLeod at the Golden Temple, Amritsar, Punjab, India, in 1963

Throughout this time he often visited India, researching and writing extensively about Sikh scriptures, literature, identity, and history. Between 1988 and 1993, McLeod also taught a one-term course at the University of Toronto and supervised several PhDs. From 1997 to 1998, he held a visiting fellowship at Balliol College, Oxford.

=== Honors ===
In 1986, McLeod was chosen to deliver a series of public lectures on religion, sponsored by the American Council of Learned Societies (ACLS). In 1990 the University of London awarded him a DLit. He was elected a Fellow of the Royal Society of New Zealand in 1999.

== Personal life ==
McLeod was born on 2 August 1932 to Bruce McLeod and Margaret née Hewat (m. 1928), a farming family near Feilding, New Zealand. McLeod had an older brother named Ian and a younger brother named Bruce. In May 1955 he married Margaret Wylie, whom he met during his university days. They had four children — Rory, Michael, Shaun, and Ruth (half-Punjabi; adopted during his PhD days).

On 2 February 1987, during the ACLS lecture series, he suffered a stroke; this significantly affected his ability to lecture and argue orally. McLeod recovered within a year and half. He died in New Zealand on 20 July 2009 at the age of 76.

== Published works and reception ==
=== Monographs ===
==== Guru Nanak and the Sikh Religion ====
In his PhD thesis of around 1965 (later published by OUP in 1968), McLeod introduced the tools of higher criticism and philology to Sikh janamsakhis and concluded that they contained little reliable historical information. (Note: He counts 87 of 124 sakhis as variously discounted, improbable, or only possible.) The janamsakhis were apparently written by Nanak's followers about a century after his death to reflect their perceptions of him; McLeod's objective account of Nanak's life had only three paragraphs.

Simon Digby, for the Indian Economic and Social History Review, considered the work to be an important, rich, and rigorous study. A review in Archiv Orientální found his work to be the product of painstaking research and a responsible approach, supplying a wealth of information on Nanak. Khushwant Singh, reviewing for The Journal of Asian Studies, admired McLeod's dispassionate objectivity in producing an exceptional scholarship; his exhaustive reading of primary sources and methodology of source criticism was lauded in particular.

Christopher Shackle notes that McLeod's questioning of the historicity of previously unchallenged "facts" created a predictable ruffle among orthodox Sikhs. (Note: John C. B. Webster found the responses to evidence the effect of religious orthodoxy and popular sentiment even among "scholars", and the fact of few Indian scholars having proper training in religious studies.) However, he thought the work had exhibited a naive reductionist understanding of the links between hagiography and historical biography, and created a dead end for scholars not willing to align with the Khalsa-centric school. (Note: Read alongside Shackle's review of Early Sikh Tradition: A Study of the Janamsakhis (1980).) S.C.R. Weightman had a mixed opinion.

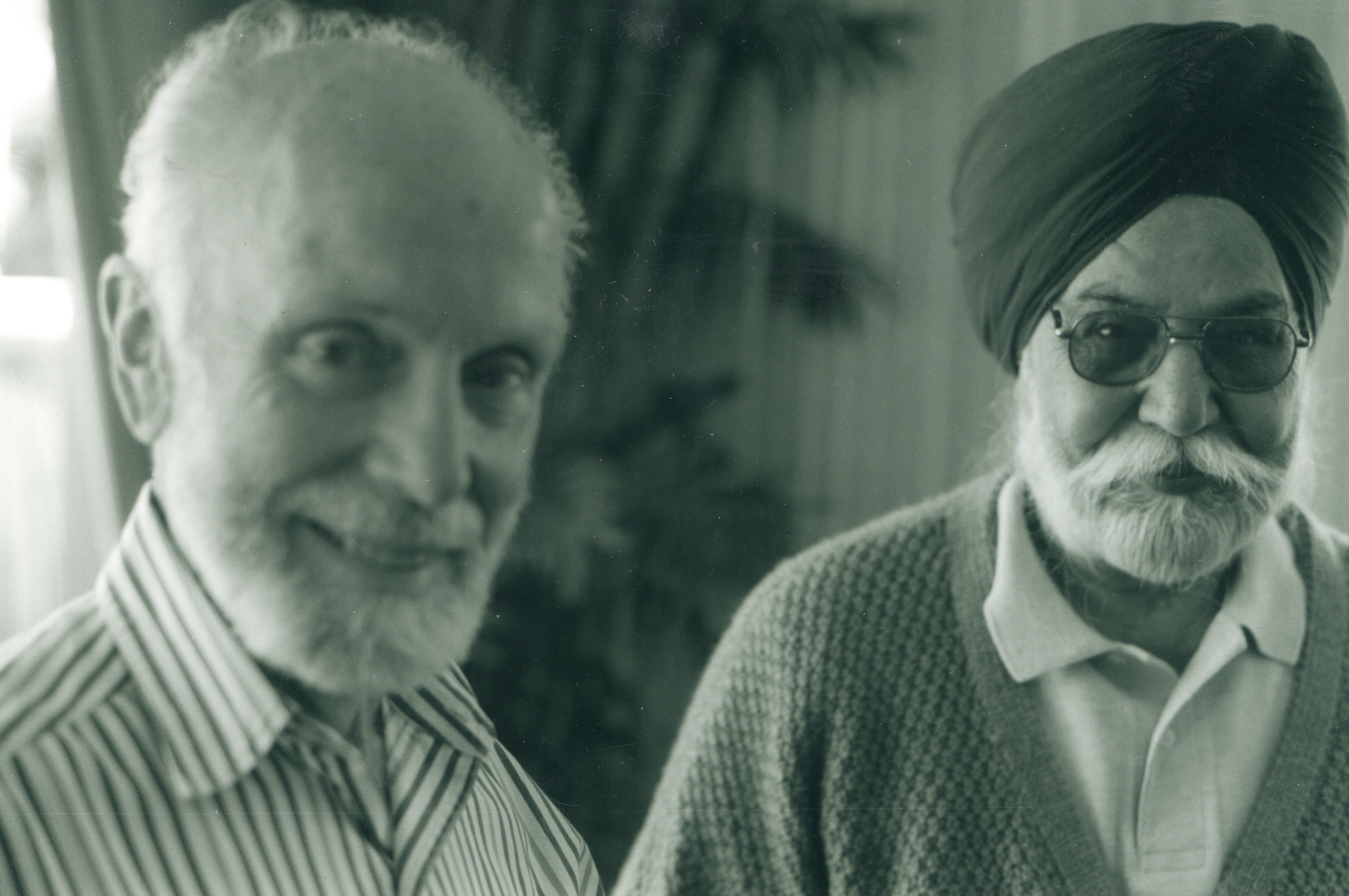
W. H. McLeod with J. S. Grewal, Santa Barbara, California UCSB, 2001. Photographed by Amarjit Chandan.

J.S. Grewal took a critical view of the book, suggesting that while considering Guru Nanak to see both Hindu and Muslim beliefs as wrong, and Sikhism to be distinct from both, as opposed to a synthesis, McLeod categorized the faith as a "reworking of the sant synthesis," despite the explicit statements of Nanak delineating the start of a new panth with new traditions.

Tony Ballantyne commends the study for introducing "rigorous professionalism" into discourse on Sikh history. Published a year before Guru Nanak's fifth birth-centenary, McLeod ran contrary to the "reverential and even hagiographical tone" of volumes that had flooded the market and his textualist methodology "transformed" the field. Harjot Oberoi opines that the entire field of Sikh Studies should remain indebted to McLeod's pioneering book. A 2009 editorial of Sikh Formations noted the work to be a seminal and highly influential contribution to the field. Pashaura Singh, Michael Hawley and Susan Prill note that McLeod's work remains the best in expounding Nanak's teachings.

==== Early Sikh Tradition: A Study of the Janamsakhis ====
Written in 1971, this was first published in 1980 by The Clarendon Press.

Christopher Shackle, in a review for the Journal of the Royal Asiatic Society, found the work to be formidable in its pioneering borrowing of higher criticism from Biblical studies; it was far more sophisticated than his 1968 volume and among the rare examples of major scholarship arising out of traditionally neglected areas. Surjit Hans noted that McLeod's knowledge of the janamsakhis was unrivaled. So did Christine Moliner.

Shackle later noted that the political turbulence in Punjab since the 80s meant that McLeod's best work failed to receive its deserved attention among scholars. Pashaura Singh, Michael Hawley and Susan Prill saw in it a comprehensive analysis of the hagiographical canon of janamsakhis.

==== Sikhs of the Khalsa: A History of the Khalsa Rahit (2003) ====
His last significant work, this was noted by Christopher Shackle to be the last word on the question of the development of Sikh Identity.

=== Essay Volumes ===
==== The Evolution of the Sikh Community ====
In 1975, McLeod published this collection of five essays.

Clive Dewey was effusive in his praise of the work; even if McLeod had written nothing else, this "bravura performance" would have been sufficient to establish his unprecedented caliber in the field of Sikh Studies. J.S. Grewal was again critical of his approach.

==== The Sikhs: History, Religion, and Society ====
Seven essays, five of which were reprints of ACLS lectures, were published by Columbia University Press in 1989.

Christopher Shackle, in a review for the Journal of the Royal Asiatic Society, found the volume to be a must-read for all students of Sikh History. McLeod's willingness to critique his earlier stances and his fluency in recent scholarship were admired. Shackle found the second essay to be the "most stimulating", where McLeod used newer evidence to convincingly reject the popularly ascribed role of Islam in the development of Sikhism.

==== Who is a Sikh? The Problems of the Sikh Identity ====
Published in 1990 by Oxford University Press, this collated ten essays that were delivered during the 1986-87 Radhakrishnan Lecture at Oxford University.

Christopher Shackle, in a review for the Bulletin of the School of Oriental and African Studies, found the work to be quite good but poorer than his The Sikhs: History, Religion, and Society. Both W. Owen Cole (reviewing for the Journal of the Royal Asiatic Society) and Surjit Hans (reviewing for Studies in History) found the book a mandatory read for anyone with an interest in Sikh identity. Bruce La Brack, reviewing for the Journal of Asian Studies, noted that the volume re-established why McLeod was the leading scholar of Sikh Studies in the West.

=== Translation ===
==== The Chaupa Singh Rahit-nama (1987) ====
Christopher Shackle, in a review for the Bulletin of the School of Oriental and African Studies, felt the work cemented McLeod's reputation as the preeminent scholar of Sikh Studies. The detailed notes accompanying the text and McLeod's introduction detailing the historical development of the text were particularly praised.

=== Bibliography ===
==== Textual Sources for the Study of Sikhism (1984) ====
Christopher Shackle felt the work ably presented the fundamental texts of Sikh tradition. Pashaura Singh, Michael Hawley and Susan Prill found it to be a good selection of texts.

=== Reference works ===
==== Historical Dictionary of Sikhism ====
This was first published by Bloomsbury in 1995 under the editorship of McLeod. A second edition appeared in 2005. A third edition was published in 2014 by Scarecrow Press, with Louis Fenech becoming co-editor.

The A to Z of Sikhism

Published in 2009. Michael Hawley found this to be a useful and reliable reference for Sikh scholars, containing "clearly written" and "informative" definitions. However, certain expected entries were skipped or were too short and the cross-referencing was poor; the dictionary was also in the need of an update to accommodate diaspora Sikhs.

=== Collections ===
==== Exploring Sikhism: Aspects of Sikh Identity, Culture, and Thought ====
Published by Oxford University Press in 2000, this contains sixteen previously published essays.

In a review for Nova Religio, George Adams noted an exhaustive examination of all important aspects of the Sikh tradition in a lucid and convincing manner. Daniel Gold, reviewing for The Indian Economic & Social History Review, praised McLeod as the foremost Western historian of Sikhism, whose "careful scholarship and thoughtful analytic temper" were visible across all essays; the volume was authoritative and remained accessible to scholars as well as laymen.

==== Sikhs and Sikhism ====
An omnibus volume, this was published by Oxford University Press as a hardback in 1999 and reissued in 2004. It comprises four works — Guru Nanak and the Sikh Religion, Early Sikh Tradition: A Study of the Janamsakhis, The Evolution of the Sikh Community, and Who is a Sikh? The Problems of the Sikh Identity.

Frederick M. Smith remarked in a review that despite methodological advances in the field, the omnibus was a must-read for all scholars of religion. Christopher Shackle noted that the omnibus has already established itself as the standard reference work.

==== Essays in Sikh History, Tradition, and Society ====
A collation of his most significant essays, the collection was published by Oxford University Press in 2007.
