= Gurinder Singh (disambiguation) =

Baba Gurinder Singh Ji (born 1954) is the spiritual head of Radha Soami Satsang Beas.

Gurinder Singh may also refer to:

- Gurinder Singh (cricketer) (born 1992), Indian cricketer
- Gurinder Singh (field hockey) (born 1995), Indian field hockey player
- Gurinder Singh (volleyball) (born 1989), Indian volleyball player
- Gurinder Singh Garry Punjab MLA and politician

== See also ==
- Gurvinder Singh (disambiguation)
- Gurjinder Singh (disambiguation)
- Gurwinder Singh
