= Baring Union Christian College =

Baring Union Christian College is a postgraduate college in Batala, Punjab, India. It is affiliated with Guru Nanak Dev University in Amritsar. The campus includes the palace of Maharaja Sher Singh.

== History ==
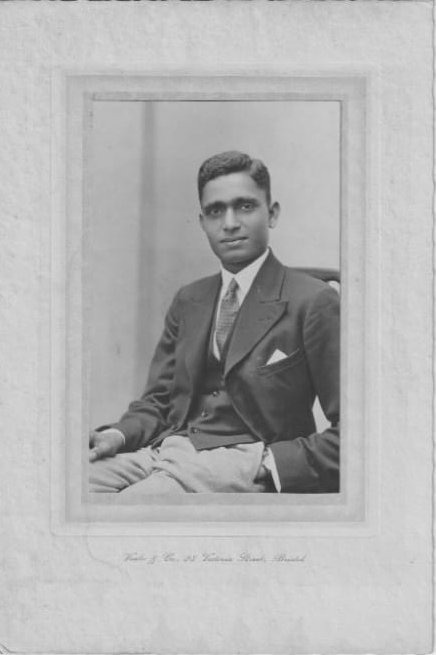
Terence Khushal-Singh, founder and first principal of Baring Christian College

Reverend Francis Henry Baring, a missionary, established Baring Boys boarding school on behalf of the Church Mission Society in April 1878. Baring High School was opened in the 1930s. Baring Union Christian College was established in June 1944.

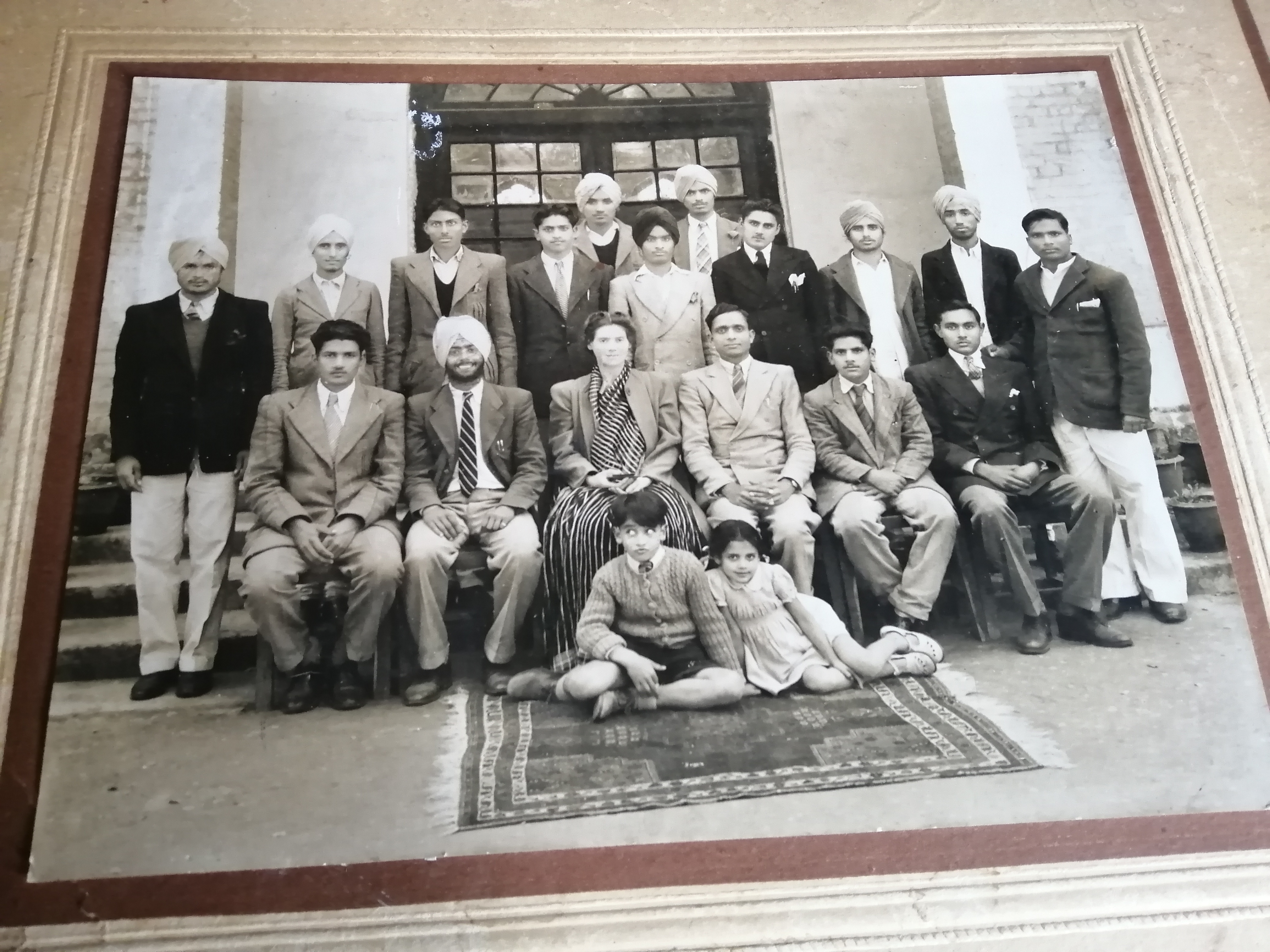
A whole school photograph at Baring Christian College

Baring Union Christian College, Batala, Punjab, sprang from the seeds of a simple school founded by Miss Sarah Maria Tucker, in about 1886 for the purpose of teaching children Bible stories. But she also had a profound interest in the welfare of the people of Batala and, locally, she was affectionately known as A.L.O.E. (A Lady Of England). She teamed up with Francis Henry Baring, who had already come to Batala and, together, they set up the Boys High School for the teaching of Christian Leadership. It was to this school that, in 1942, Terence Khushal-Singh M.A. B.A. LL.B (Allahabad University) Diploma of Education, Bristol, England, was sent by the Church Missionary Society (CMS) to become principal.

Nearby, Khushal-Singh saw the now empty and neglected Anarkali Palace, once owned by Maharajah Sher Singh, and he had the inspiration to turn it into a college of further education. With his passion, hardworking dedication, and with the support of his English wife, Jessica, an M.A. of Cambridge University, the CMS agreed to support him, with a strong recommendation from the Bishop of Lahore. The transformation went ahead. In 1944, Baring Christian College was founded.

In 1947/8 with Independence, and Partition, there was confusion when, for a while, Batala and the Baring College was first allotted into Pakistan, along with most other Christian colleges, but was then returned to India. During the turbulence, all education came to a standstill and Khushal Singh, risking his life on an almost daily basis, found himself running a refugee camp in the grounds of Baring Christian College, where Lady Edwina Mountbatten also asked him to set up a Handicraft Section for refugee women.

In March 1948, Khushal Singh was able to reopen the college and, by 1949, it had progressed from being an Intermediate College, to a full degree College.

But Khushal Singh’s personal triumph of 1949 turned to bitter disappointment when, following Indian independence, the CMS decided to withdraw from Batala. Baring Christian College was handed over to an American Presbyterian Church with a new principal, Ranjit M Chetsingh, and Khushal Singh was sent by the CMS to Pune to become principal of St. Mary’s teacher Training College. He was heartbroken, as were his Baring students:

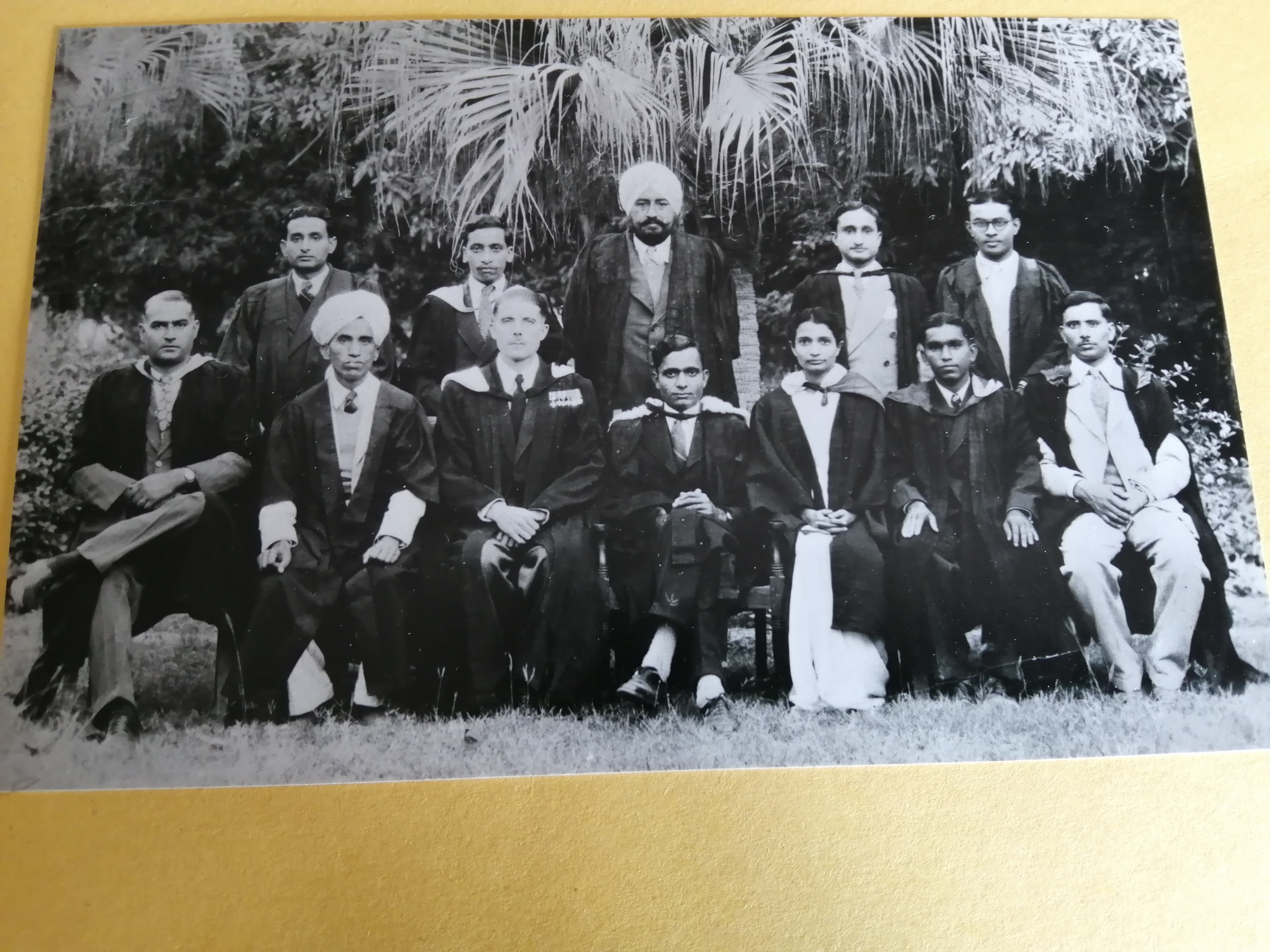
The first staff photograph at Baring Christian College

A Farewell to the First Principal

The Gardener of the Garden of Knowledge

The Founder of the Baring College

The Priest of the Temple of Light

The True Patriot from Heart’s Height

But neither the CMS nor the American Presbyterians wanted this to be seen as any kind of schism between the two Christian bodies, or those Christian colleges which, though founded in India, had been placed in Pakistan. So, another word was added to the name of the Batala college: Union. From then on, the college was known as Baring Union Christian College.

The college continued under the leadership of principal R.M. Chetsingh until he left to take up a place with the Friends World Committee for Consultation in London in 1954.

Further principals were Dr Loughlin, Dr McLeod, and Dr. Webster, who was particularly interested in Sikhism. Mr. Clarence McMullin who, for a year, officiated as Principal of Baring Union Christian College, was subsequently Director of the Christian Institute for Sikh Studies – a post he held with great influence for 30 years until he retired.

Baring Union Christian College continues to this day, presently under Principal Dr. Edward Masih.

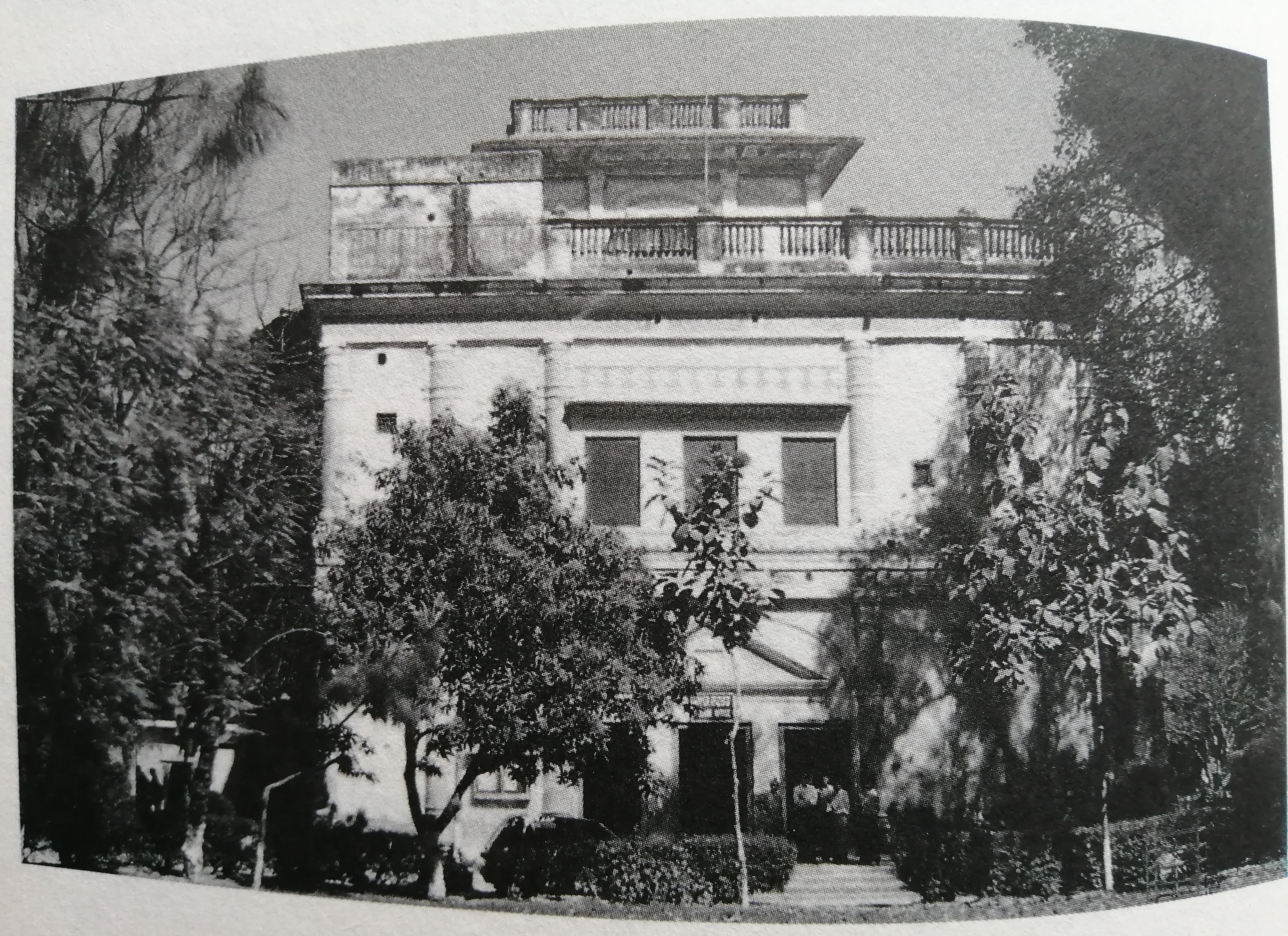
Anarkali Palace, which was converted into a campus for Baring Christian College
