= Jaswant Singh Neki =

Punjabi poet (1925–2015)

- Born: 27 August 1925; Murid, Jhelum district, Punjab, British India
- Died: 11 September 2015 (aged 90); New Delhi, India
- Occupations: Doctor, Poet, Scholar
- Spouse: Kanwerjit Neki (m. 1945)
- Children: 2
- Writing career
- Notable work: Simriti De Kiran Ton Pehlan (Before Shedding Memory) (1975)
- Literary movement: Metaphysical poetry

Jaswant Singh Neki (27 August 1925 – 11 September 2015) was a leading Indian Sikh scholar, significant neo-metaphysical Punjabi language poet and former Director of PGI Chandigarh and Head of the Psychiatry Department at All India Institute of Medical Sciences (AIIMS), Delhi.

As a poet he is known mostly for his poetry collections, Asle to Ohle Tak (Illusion and Reality, 1955) and autobiographical, Koi Naon Na Jane Mera (2000). He was awarded the Sahitya Akademi Award in Punjabi in 1979 for his work, Karuna Di Chuh Ton Magron. His long autobiographical poem Simriti De Kiran Ton Pehlan (Before Shedding Memory) published in 1975, is considered among the masterpieces of Indian literature. His works as a scholar of Sikhism include, Ardaas: Darshan Roop Te Abhiyas, Sada Vigas, Achetan di Leela, Divine Intimations, Prophet of Devotion and Pilgrimage to Hemkunt.

== Early life and education ==
He was born in the village of Murid, District of Jhelum (in present-day Pakistan). His father was S. Hari Gulab Singh and his mother was Smt. Sita Wanti. When he was still an infant, his parents moved to Quetta in (Baluchistan) in present-day Pakistan.

== Education ==
It was in Quetta that he joined Khalsa High School whence he matriculated in 1941 securing the highest marks in Baluchistan and setting up a new record. He joined the Forman Christian College, Lahore, for his premedical studies.

There he enjoyed two merit scholarships – one granted by the University and the other by the college. In his FSc (Medical) exam, he stood second in the university. For his graduate course in medicine and surgery, he joined King Edward Medical College, Lahore, where he also received a merit scholarship granted by the Government of Baluchistan.

In 1947 when the country was partitioned, he left Lahore and joined Government Medical College, Amritsar, where he completed his medical studies to graduate in 1949. He worked first as a House Physician, then as an Assistant Registrar, and then as a Demonstrator in Medical College, Amritsar, with a short stint, in between, as Demonstrator in Christian Medical College Ludhiana. While teaching there, he passed his M.A. (Psychology) exam as a teacher candidate from Aligarh Muslim University, securing First Division and first position in the University. He passed his DPM exam from All India Institute of Mental Health, Bangalore, and Mysore University, in 1958 with double distinction and setting up a new record. Thus he qualified as a psychiatrist.

== Professional career ==
As a psychiatrist, rising through the ranks, he became Professor & Head of Psychiatry Department at the All India Institute of Medical Sciences, New Delhi and occupied that chair for about a decade (1968–1978). He was then appointed Director of the Post Graduate Institute of Medical Education and Research, Chandigarh (PGI) where he spent three years (1978–1981). From there, he was picked up by the World Health Organization, Geneva, as a consultant for a project in Africa where he served for over four years (1981–1985). He came back home in 1985, and then engaged in private practice. In between, he had a short engagement with the United Nations Development Programme and United Nations Fund for Drug Abuse (South-East Asia).

He also served as Chairman of the Board of Consultants constituted by the Delhi Sikh Gurdwara Management Committee for setting up of an Institute of Medical Sciences. In 1974, he was elected as a Fellow of the National Academy of Medical Sciences and in 1989, he received Kohli Memorial Award for being the Best Professional of the Year.

== Literary activities ==
He is a well-recognized metaphysical poet in Punjabi who has contributed ten volumes of original verse. His opus magnum is his autobiography in verse. He also wrote powerful, inspiring prose as evidenced by his books Achetan di Leela, Meri Sahitak Swaijeevani and Ardas. He has won several prestigious awards in literature. These include: Sahitya Akademi Award, Asan Memorial Award, Shiromani Sahitkar Award (Languages Deptt.), Sarvotam Sahitkar Award (Punjabi Akademy, Delhi) in 2009 for Sada Vigaas (prose)., Bhai Vir Singh Award, KS Dhaliwal Award, Puran Singh Memorial Award. Guru Nanak Dev University conferred on him Ph.D. honorous causa for his contribution to literature. He has been a member of the jury (Punjabi) for Sahitya Akademy Awards and member of the Advisory Committee (Punjabi) for Jnan Peeth Award. He was one of the past Chairmen of Punjabi Academy, Chandigarh.

He also served as Honorary General Secretary of Bhai Vir Singh Sahitya Sadan, New Delhi.

== Religious activities ==
Belonging to a devout religious family, Dr Neki always evinced keen interest in religion. Like his family, he also observed unbigoted, liberal views. During his student life, he became President of the All India Sikh Students Federation and organised training camps for the Sikh youth in the Sikh lore. He produced two authentic books. One is Ardas – Darshan, Roop te Abhias which has been evaluated as an 'all-time classic'. The second one, Vishva Ardas, is a collection of over 300 prayers from different religious groups, tribes and communities of different times and places, translated into Punjabi verse. This has been called "a landmark piece of work". Commissioned by Guru Nanak Dev University, he wrote The Spiritual Heritage of the Punjab which traces the evolution of spiritual thought and practice from the pre-Aryan times up to Guru Gobind Singh. Lately, he has produced an exquisitely produced book Pilgrimage to Hemkunt that compares with high international standards.

For several years, he was a member of the Dharam Prachar Committee of Shiromani Gurdwara Prabandhak Committee, the elected body that administers Sikh shrines. He was honoured with the 'Order of the Khalsa' Award on the 300th Anniversary of the Khalsa, celebrated in Anandpur Sahib on 13 April 2000. He represented his community at various international forums including The Parliament World Religions 1993, Unesco Conference on Religion and World Peace 1998, Unesco Center Catalunya Conference on Universal Ethics 1998, World Thanksgiving Conference 1999

In 2001, he received the Giani Lal Singh memorial award for his work in the field of poetry.

== Personal life ==
In 1955, he married Kanwerjit, the eldest daughter of his own Professor, Lt. Col. Dr. Gurbaksh Singh. Neki died on September 11, 2015, In New Delhi. He had two children: a daughter who died in 2024 and a son who lives in the United States.

== Publications ==
1955	Asle te Ohle	Singh Brothers, Amritsar	Punjabi Poetry
1965	Eh Mere Sanse Eh Mere Geet	Singh Brothers, Amritsar	Punjabi Poetry
1975	Simrati de Kiran Ton Pehlan	Navyug Publishers, New Delhi	Punjabi Poetry
1978	Karuna Di Chuh Ton Magron	Navyug Publishers, New Delhi	Punjabi Poetry
1980	Pratibimban De Sarovar'chon	Punjabi Writers Coopoerative, New Delhi	Punjabi Poetry
1985	Na Eh Geet Na Birharha	Navyug Publishers, New Delhi	Punjabi Poetry
1989	Birkhe Heth Sabh Jant	Navyug Publishers, New Delhi	Punjabi Poetry
1989	Ardas: Darshan Roop Te Abhiaas	Singh Brothers, Amritsar	Sikh Religion
1990	Paani Wich Patase	Bhai Vir Singh Sahitya Sadan, New Delhi	Punjabi Poetry (Rhymes for Children)
1992	Geet Mera Sohila Tera	Singh Brothers, Amritsar	Punjabi Poetry
1992	Meri Sahitik Sve Jivanee	Punjabi University, Patiala	Literary Autobiography
1997	Vishav Ardas	Singh Brothers, Amritsar	Punjabi Poetry (World Prayers)
1998	Achetan Di Leela	Guru Nanak Dev University, Amritsar	Psychology
2000	Koi Naon Na Jaane Mera	Singh Brothers, Amritsar	Punjabi Poetry (Autobiography)
2000	Spiritual Heritage of Punjab	Guru Nank Dev University, Amritsar	Spirituality
2002	Pilgrimage to Hemkunt	UBSPD and NIPS	Spiritual Travelogue
2004	Sungad Abnoos Di	ARSEE Publishers, Delhi	Punjabi Poetry
2004	Prophet of Devotion	SATVIC Media Pvt. Ltd., Amritsar	Life & Teachingsof Sri Guru Angad Dev
2005	My Ardas & My Gurus' Bani	SNP Panpac Pte Ltd, Singapore	Ardas, Japji Sahib, Rahiras and Sohila for Children
2006	Divine Intimations – Nitnem	Hemkunt Publishers, New Delhi	Banis Japji Sahib, Jap Sahib, Sawayyas, Rehras Sahib, Sohila Sahib and Ardas
2007	Guru Granth Sahib and Its Context	Bhai Vir Singh Sahitay Sadan	Essays on different aspects of Guru Granth Sahib
2011	Asal Vidya	Sukrit Trust, Ludhiana	Anectodes from Author's life
