= Gurinder Singh Mann =

Sikh scholar

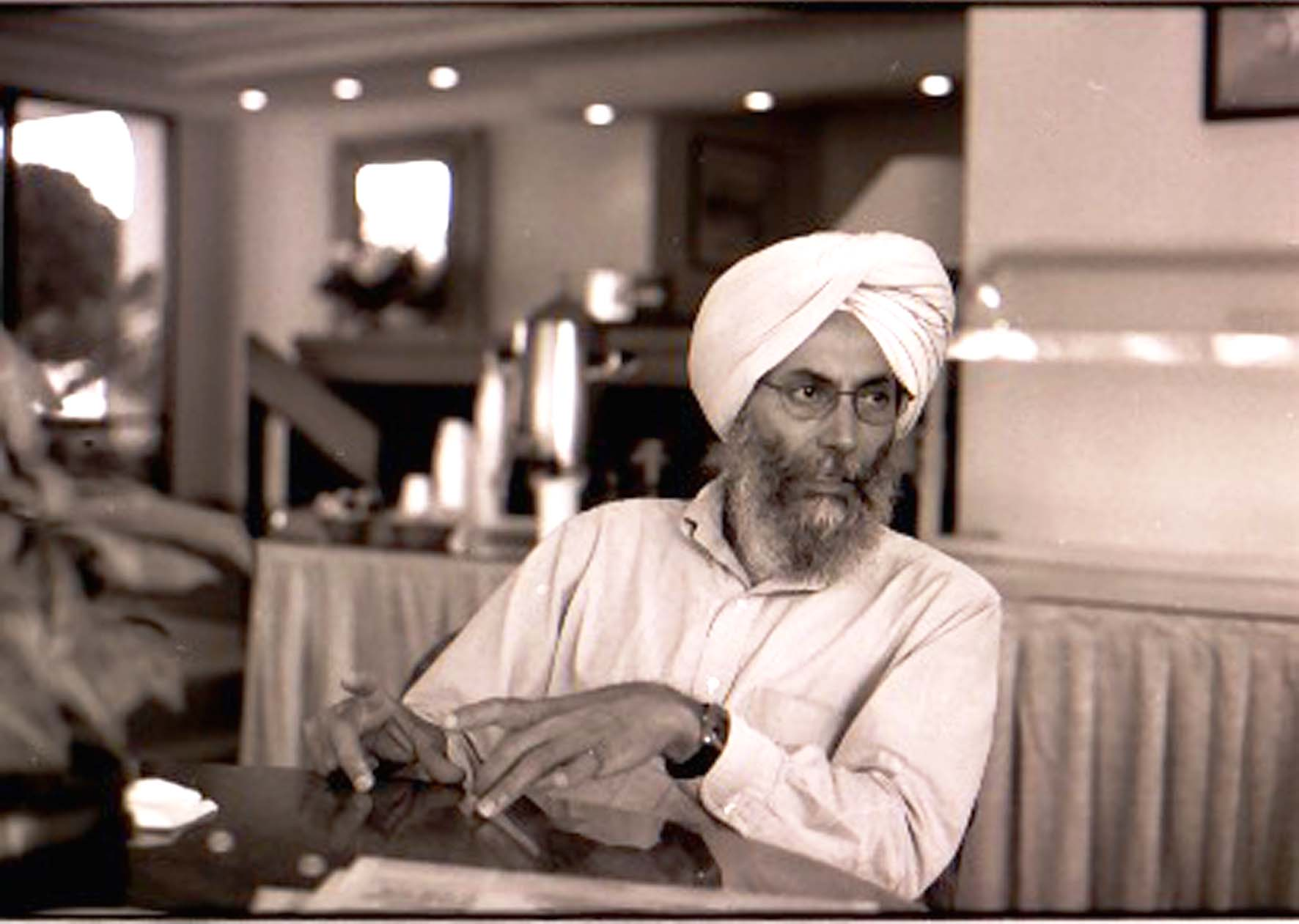
Gurinder Singh Mann at Goleta, California in 2001.

Gurinder Singh Mann is a Punjabi-American scholar and professor of Sikh studies, and the author of multiple books on Sikh religion and society. Mann taught religion at Columbia University from 1988 to 1999 and then held the Kundan Kaur Kapany Chair in Sikh Studies from 1999 to 2015 at the University of California, Santa Barbara. He retired from Santa Barbara in 2015, and founded the Global Institute for Sikh Studies in New York City, which he presently directs.

== Education ==
Mann studied for a master's degree in English from Baring Union Christian College in Batala, Punjab, from 1965 to 1971, completed a diploma in English Studies at the Central Institute of English and Foreign Languages in Hyderabad, India, in 1975, and earned a second master's degree in English from the University of Kent at Canterbury, England, in 1976. From 1984 to 1987 he studied for Master of Theological Studies at Harvard University and completed his Ph.D. with distinction in Religion at Columbia University in 1993.

== Career ==
Mann taught English at Baring Union Christian College, Batala from 1971 to 1984, religion at Columbia University from 1988 to 1999 and then held the Kundan Kaur Kapany Chair in Sikh Studies at the University of California, Santa Barbara from 1999 to 2015.

In 2013, he came under investigation by UCSB's Title IX office for inappropriate "sexual conduct, both verbal and physical", with a female student, and for similar complaints from some other students. Mann denied the claims, but its report concluded that "more likely than not" inappropriate conduct did occur.

== Selected publications ==
Mann is the author or editor of:

- Studying the Sikhs: Issues for North America (edited with John Stratton Hawley, State University of New York Press, 1993)
- The Goindval Pothis: The Earliest Extant Source of the Sikh Canon (Harvard University Press, 1996)
- The Making of Sikh Scripture (Oxford University Press, 2001)
- Sikhism (Prentice Hall, Religions of the World Series, 2004; Japanese & Spanish editions, 2007)
- Buddhists, Hindus and Sikhs in America (with Paul David Numrich and Raymond Williams, Oxford University Press, 2008)
- Introduction To Punjabi: Grammar, Conversation And Literature (with Ami P. Shah et al., Punjabi University, 2011)
- Brill's Encyclopedia of Sikhism, Volume 1 (with Kristina Myrvold et al., for its review, please see http://giss.org/jsps_vol_25/webster-review.pdf)
- Four special issues of the Journal of Punjab Studies on 20th-Century Punjabi Literature, Guru Gobind Singh, W. H. McLeod, J. S. Grewal.
