= Harjot Oberoi =

Sikh scholar

Harjot Singh Oberoi is a Professor of Asian Studies at the University of British Columbia, Vancouver. He received his PhD from the Australian National University. His thesis earned him the J.G. Crawford Prize in 1987. He is known for his studies of Sikh history, particularly during the late 19th-century and early 20th-century.

== Book ==
Oberoi wrote The Construction of Religious Boundaries: Culture, Identity, and Diversity in the Sikh Tradition. The book examines the first four centuries of Sikh traditions, and shows that most Sikhs recognized multiple identities grounded in "local, regional, religious, and secular loyalties". Sikhs did not establish distinct religious boundaries until the Singh Sabha Movement, according to Oberoi. His book is described by the publisher as "a major reinterpretation of religion and society in India".

Sociologist T. N. Madan states Oberoi is a "careful Sikh scholar", while the Sikhism historian W. H. McLeod has called his book as "superb" that "successfully challenges the accepted historiography and is "very significant" to Sikh history studies. Tony Ballantyne states that Oberoi's studies of late 19th-century and early 20th-century religious developments in British India is the "most sophisticated cultural analysis of social change". In contrast, Surinder Jodhka states that Oberoi study is highly controversial within the Sikh community, though many consider it as a "landmark study of Sikh history".

== Papers ==
- Oberoi, Harjot S. "From Punjab to" Khalistan": Territoriality and Metacommentary", Pacific Affairs (1987): 26-41
- Oberoi, Harjot Singh. "The worship of Pir Sakhi Sarvar: Illness, healing and popular culture in the Punjab", Studies in History 3, no. 1 (1987): 29-55.
- Oberoi, Harjot Singh. "From Ritual to Counter Ritual: Rethinking the Hindu-Sikh Question'." The Sikh History and Religion in the Twentieth Century, Toronto, University of Toronto (1988).
- Oberoi, Harjot. "Popular saints, goddesses, and village sacred sites: rereading Sikh experience in the nineteenth century." History of Religions 31, no. 4 (1992): 363-384
- Oberoi, Harjot. "Brotherhood of the Pure: The Poetics and Politics of Cultural Transgression." Modern Asian Studies 26, no. 1 (1992): 157-197.
- Oberoi, Harjot. "Mapping Indic fundamentalisms through nationalism and modernity." Fundamentalisms comprehended 5 (1995): 96-114.
- Oberoi, Harjot. "The Making of a Religious Paradox: Sikh, Khalsa, Sahajdhari as Modes of Early Sikh Identity." Bhakti Religion in North India: Community Identity and Political Action (1995): 35-66.
- Oberoi, Harjot. "Imagining Indian diasporas in Canada: An epic without a text?" In Culture and economy in the Indian diaspora, pp. 195-208. Routledge, 2003.
- Oberoi, Harjot. "Empire, Orientalism, and Native Informants: The Scholarly Endeavours of Sir Attar Singh Bhadour." JPS 17 (2010): 1-2.
