= Anandpur =

Anandpur may refer to the following topics in India:

- Anandpur Bhadla, a village in Chotila taluka (sub-district) of Surendranagar district, Gujarat, India
  - Anandpur State, a former princely state with seat in the above town
- Anandpur, Firozabad, a village in Uttar Pradesh, India
- Anandpur Kalu, a village in Jaitaran tehsil of Pali district in Rajasthan, India
- Anandpur Sahib, Sikh holy city in Punjab, India
  - Anandpur Sahib Assembly constituency
  - Anandpur Sahib (Lok Sabha constituency)
  - Anandpur Sahib railway station
  - Anandpur Lipi, Gurmukhi (Punjabi-language script) calligraphic style associated with Guru Gobind Singh
  - Anandpur Sahib Resolution, a statement made by a Sikh political party, the Shiromani Akali Dal, in 1973
- Anandpur, Vikramgad, a village in the Palghar district of Maharashtra, India, in the Vikramgad taluka

== See also ==
- Battle of Anandpur (disambiguation)
- Anandapur (disambiguation)
- Nonthaburi (disambiguation)
- Anandapuram, Andhra Pradesh, India
- Anandpuri, Indian Hindu religious leader
