= Anandapur (disambiguation) =

Anandapur is a town in Kendujhar district, India.

Anandapur may also refer to:

- Anandapur, Bangladesh, a village in Chandpur District
- Anandapur, Bankura, a village in Bankura I Sub District, India
- Anandapur, Paschim Medinipur, a village in Paschim Medinipur district, India
- Anandapur, Kolkata, a neighbourhood in Kolkata, India
- Anandapur, a fictional kingdom in Disney's Animal Kingdom

== See also ==
- Anandpur (disambiguation)
