= Sikh copper-plate inscriptions =

Inscribed copper plates donated by Guru Gobind Singh to Hindu temples

Sikh copper-plate inscriptions (Tamar Patar) are historical Sikh inscribed copper plates that were commissioned by Guru Gobind Singh and gifted by him to three-known Hindu temples during his guruship period. (Note: The term "tamar-patar" is alternatively transliterated as 'tamba-patra', 'tamar-patra', 'tamra-patra'. These artefacts are also known as 'tamra-shasan' or 'tamarashasana'.) Three inscribed copper plates of this kind are known.

== Description ==
The copper plates were etched in the Gurmukhi script by the sevadars or scribes in the service of the tenth Sikh guru. They were likely created by blacksmiths serving the Sikh court, who then printed the inscriptions on the plate. The Sikh guru gave the command for the commissioning of a copper plate in the morning-time, leaving the blacksmiths to create the product and paraphrase the Guru's command to writing in the form of the inscriptions present on the plates. When the copper plate was ready, it was bestowed to a local priest of the temple.

It had been a custom of the Rajput Rajas, of the Punjab Pahari Hills region, to commission and gift inscribed copper plates to Hindu temples falling within the jurisdiction of their polity. Guru Gobind Singh, who had been becoming more influential in the regions of Paonta and Anandpur, emulated the Hill Rajas by commissioning and gifting his own copper plates to prominent Hindu temples in the area his entourage resided in. By adopting and imitating local royal customs of the region, this was a sign of the growing power and influence of the Sikh guru. The temples of particular regions accepting copper plates issued by the Sikh guru served as a symbol of their "formal submission to Sikh authority".

The inscribed copper plates were brought to the light of mainstream Sikh Studies through the research and fieldwork of Gurinder Singh Mann. The inscribed copper plates of this region and era served as a symbol of political patronage, benevolence, and authority. Between the years 1650 to 1725, twenty-six extant examples of such copper plates are known, which were gifted by local Hill polities to Hindu temples in the Naina Devi region. The current familial custodians of the Sikh-commissioned copper plates all vouch for their authenticity and have preserved them due to their importance related to the sites they were gifted to.

=== Naina Devi ===
The Naina Devi temple near Paonta was a recipient of a copper plate by the Sikh guru. The presentation of this inscribed copper plate to the Naina Devi temple is recorded in a late 18th-century Sikh text called Sudharam Marag Granth ('Book of the Good Religious Path'). This source asserts that Guru Gobind Singh gifted the copper plate to a Brahmin of Naina Devi named Bhadia while the guru visited the temple. Bhadia was the head priest of a Havan ceremony being performed and had been paid 100,000 rupees by the Sikh guru. However, Bhadia rejected this monetary sum and requested that the guru gift him something that will last for a long-time and survive throughout the generations to be revered. As a result, the Sikh guru bestowed an inscribed copper plate, with its inscription in the form of a Hukam edict, to the Brahmin of Naina Devi instead. The inscription etched on this copper plate was scribed in the Anandpuri Lipi style of Gurmukhi. This style of Gurmukhi script can also be found in Hukamnama manuscripts and Khas Patra pages of historical manuscripts of the Dasam Granth, which had been handwritten by the Sikh guru himself. Contemporary Sikh sources make no mention of the issuing of an inscribed copper plate to the Naina Devi temple by the Sikh guru.

A translation of the inscription of the copper plate is rendered as follows:

Salutations to Naina (Namo Naine). Bhadia is our priest (purohit). Those who follow us should acknowledge him.

— G. S. Mann, Sources for the Study of Guru Gobind Singh's Life and Times, page 240

The Naina Devi copper plate was examined by G. S. Mann in the Summer of 2000. Mann discovered that the name 'Bhadia' does appear in the genealogical records (kursinama) of the current custodians of the copper plate and traced the year this ancestor would have flourished to the year 1700 based on generational counts and lengths.

=== Kapal Mochan ===
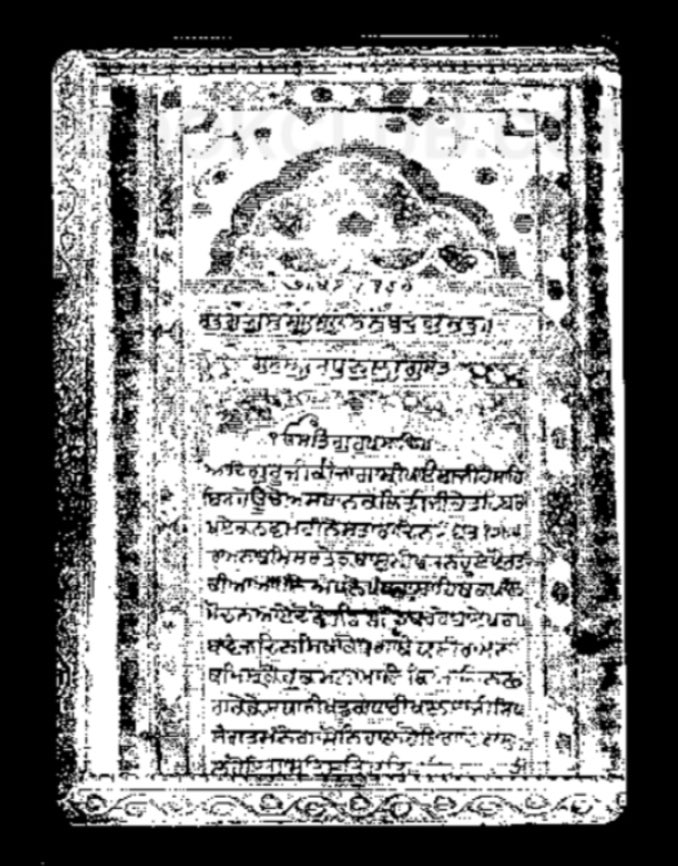
A hukamnama from Kapal Mochan temple recording the visit of Guru Gobind Singh in 1679

A Shiva temple in Kapal Mochan, located near Anandpur, had been gifted a copper plate by Guru Gobind Singh. It had been recently rediscovered. Kapal Mochan was visited by the tenth Guru when he travelled between Paonta and Anandpur. The copper plate was bestowed to the temple in the year 1679 and was a sign of the Sikh guru's interest in ruling near the area. (Note: The inscribed copper plate states the exact date it was issued. The inscribed Indic date is as follows: Samat 1736, katak badi panchami din mangalvar (Analogous to 'Tuesday, October 14, 1679' in the Gregorian calendar).) The inscription on this copper plate contains the Ardaas supplication. The inscribed copper plate employs regular (non-calligraphic) Gurmukhi font rather than Anandpuri Lipi. Curiously, the guru's name is inscribed as 'Guru Gobind Singh', containing the Singh appellation, even though the copper plate was issued to the temple in 1679, twenty years before the traditional dating of 1699 for the establishment of the Khalsa Panth. This has been used as evidence that the Khalsa may have been established earlier or at-least there were pre-cursory features of it already present amongst the Sikhs before 1699. G. S. Mann asserts that this is evidence that the tenth Guru had adopted the 'Singh' title earlier in the year 1675.

A translation of the inscription of the copper plate is rendered as follows:

One God, with the grace of the Guru. The Khalsa belongs to the Immortal one. Guru Gobind Singh bestowed the hukamnama on Jawala Das Brahman [Brahmin] on Tuesday, October 14, 1679. My Sikh, who will follow this hukamnama, will be blessed.

— G. S. Mann, Sources for the Study of Guru Gobind Singh's Life and Times, page 241

The current custodians of the copper plate claim the Sikh guru visited the Kapal Mochan temple two times, with the visits taking place in 1679 and 1688 respectively. According to them, while the Guru gifted an inscribed copper plate in 1679, he also gifted an illuminated Hukamnama document during his 1688 visit to the premises. A contemporary Sikh account of the guru's 1688 visit to the temple makes no reference to the gifting of a Hukamnama.

=== Kurukshetra ===
A temple located in Kurukshetra also received an inscribed copper plate from the Sikh guru. However, the inscribed copper plate was lost in early 1980 while it was being displayed in a local gurdwara and no photographs or etchings of its inscription are known to exist or be publicly available, rendering its contents unknown. The former, familial custodians of the plate also claimed to have had in their possession a Hukamnama document gifted to them by the tenth Sikh guru, however it was confiscated by the Shiromani Gurdwara Prabandhak Committee in the 1970s.

== Gallery ==
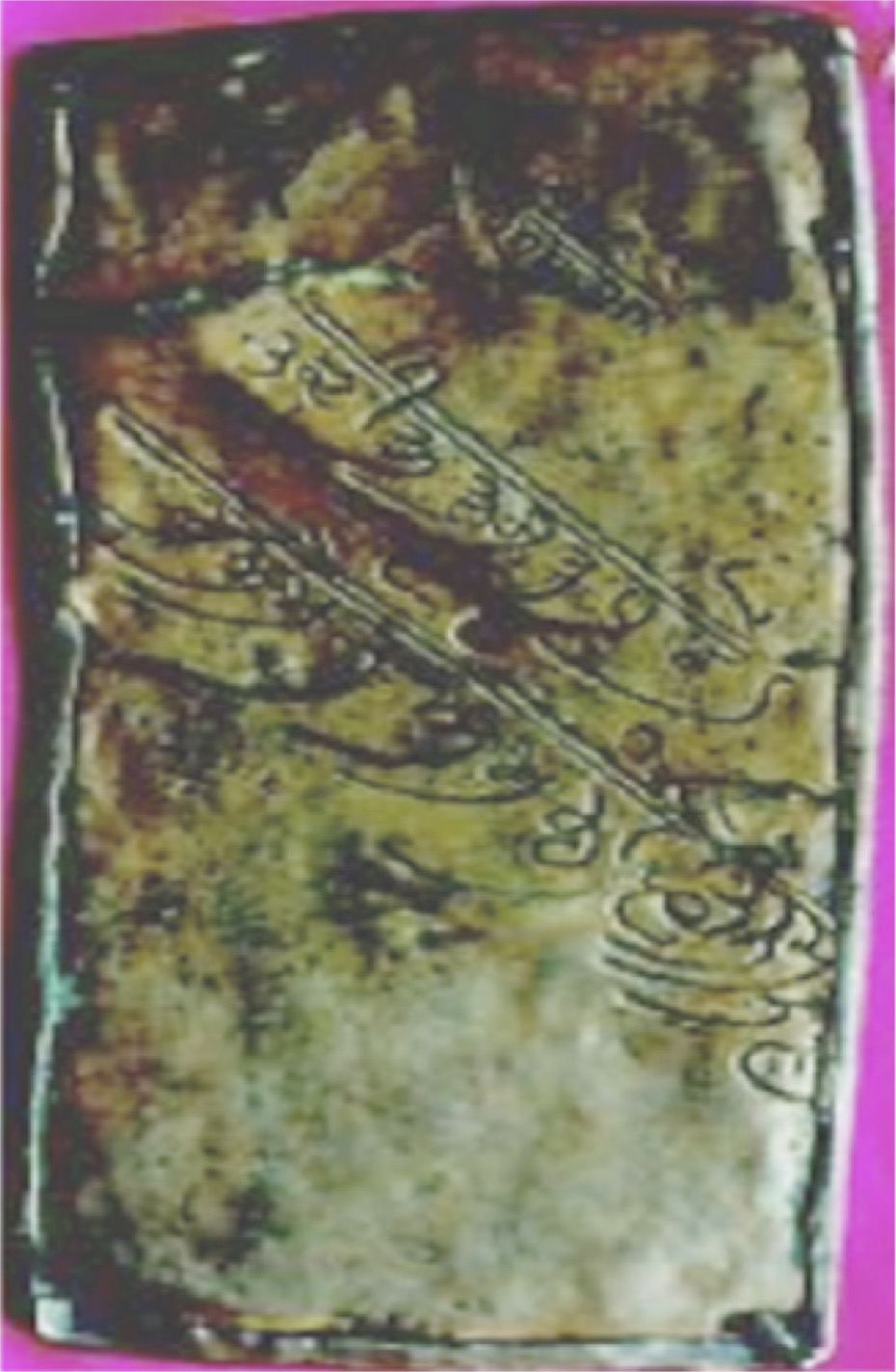
Photograph of the inscribed copper-plate gifted by Guru Gobind Singh to a Brahmin named Bhadia of the Naina Devi temple near Anandpur

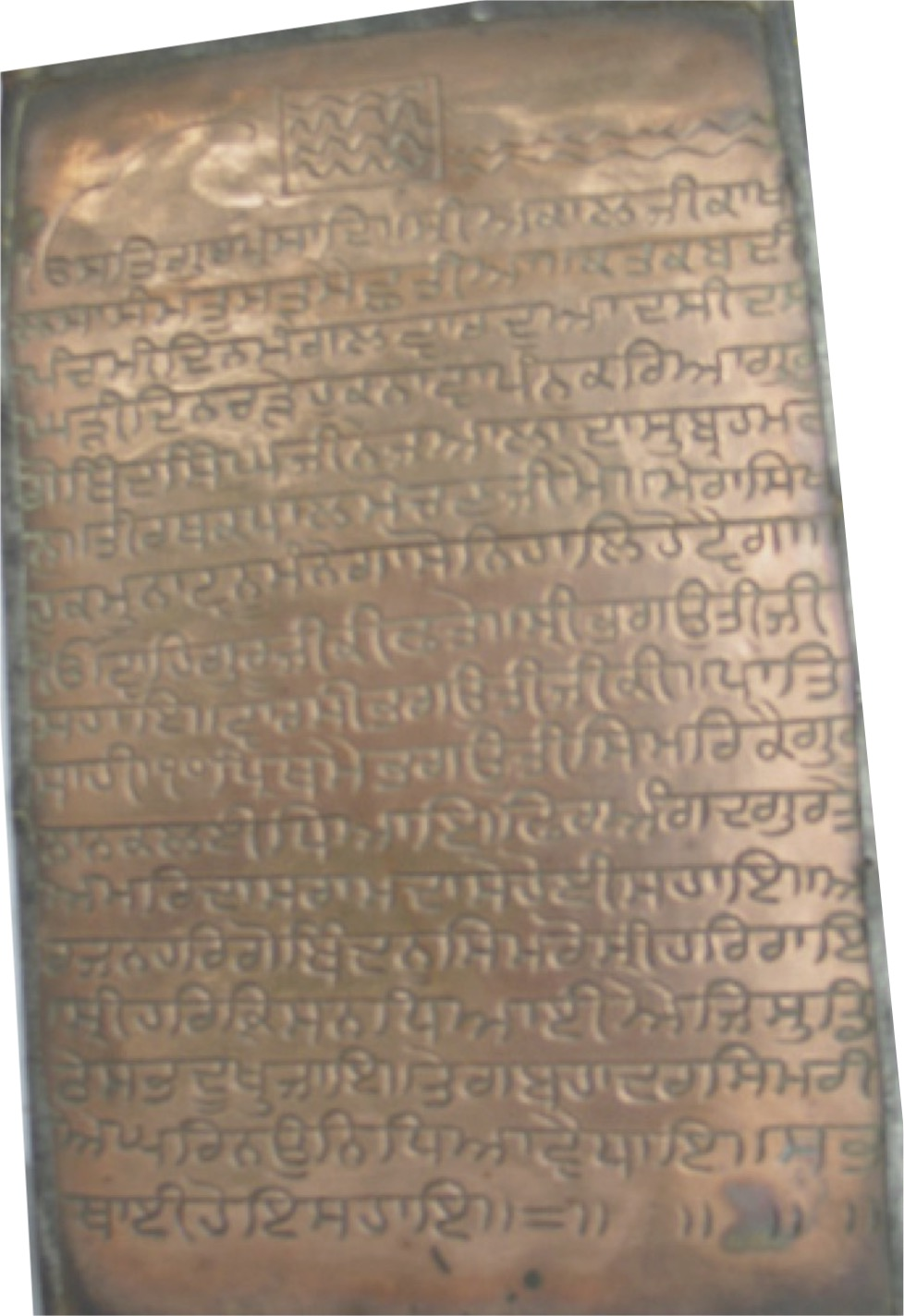
Photograph of the inscribed copper-plate gifted by Guru Gobind Singh to a Brahmin named Jawala Das of the Shiva temple of Kapal Mochan near Paonta, dated to 1679

== See also ==
- Paliya
- Hero stone
