= Standard English =

Substantially regularized variety of English

In an English-speaking country, Standard English (SE) is the variety of English that has undergone codification to the point of being socially perceived as the standard language, associated with formal schooling, language assessment, and official print publications, such as public service announcements and newspapers of record.

All linguistic features are subject to the effects of standardization, including morphology, phonology, syntax, lexicon, register, discourse markers, pragmatics, as well as written features such as spelling conventions, punctuation, capitalization and abbreviation practices. SE is local to nowhere: its grammatical and lexical components are no longer regionally marked, although many of them originated in different, non-adjacent dialects, and it has very little of the variation found in spoken or earlier written varieties of English. According to Peter Trudgill, Standard English is a social dialect pre-eminently used in writing that is distinguishable from other English dialects largely by a small group of grammatical "idiosyncrasies", such as irregular reflexive pronouns and an "unusual" present-tense verb morphology.

The term "Standard" refers to the regularization of the grammar, spelling, usages of the language and not minimal desirability or interchangeability. For example, there are substantial differences among the language varieties that countries of the Anglosphere identify as "standard English": in England and Wales, the term Standard English identifies British English, the Received Pronunciation accent, and the grammar and vocabulary of United Kingdom Standard English (UKSE); in Scotland, the variety is Scottish English; in the United States, the General American variety is the spoken standard; in Australia, the standard English is Cultivated Australian. By virtue of a phenomenon sociolinguists call "elaboration of function", specific linguistic features attributed to a standardized dialect become associated with nonlinguistic social markers of prestige (like wealth or education). The standardized dialect itself, in other words, is not linguistically superior to other dialects of English used by an Anglophone society.

Unlike with some other standard languages, there is no national academy or international academy with ultimate authority to codify Standard English; its codification is thus only by widespread prescriptive consensus. The codification is therefore not exhaustive or unanimous, but extensive and well-documented.

== Definitions ==
English is a pluricentric language because it has multiple standard varieties in different countries. Although standard English is usually associated with official communications and settings, it is diverse in registers (stylistic levels), such as those for journalism (print, television, internet) and for academic publishing (monographs, academic papers, internet). This diversity in registers also exists between the spoken and the written forms of SE, which are characterised by degrees of formality; therefore, Standard English is distinct from formal English, because it features stylistic variations, ranging from casual to formal. Furthermore, the usage codes of nonstandard dialects (vernacular language) are less stabilised than the codifications of Standard English, and thus more readily accept and integrate new vocabulary and grammatical forms. Functionally, the national varieties of SE are characterised by generally accepted rules, often grammars established by linguistic prescription in the 18th century.

English originated in England during the Anglo-Saxon period, and is now spoken as a first or second language in many countries of the world, many of which have developed one or more "national standards" (though this does not refer to published standards documents, but the frequency of consistent usage). English is the first language of the majority of the population in a number of countries, including the United Kingdom, the United States, Canada, Republic of Ireland, Australia, New Zealand, Jamaica, Trinidad and Tobago, the Bahamas, and Barbados, and is an official language in many others, including India, Pakistan, the Philippines, South Africa, and Nigeria; each country has a standard English with grammar, spelling, and pronunciation particular to the local culture.

As the result of colonisation and historical migrations of English-speaking populations, and the predominant use of English as the international language of trade and commerce (a lingua franca), English has also become the most widely used second language. Countries in which English is neither indigenous, nor widely spoken, as an additional language may import a variety of English via instructional materials (typically British English or American English) and consider it "standard" for teaching and assessment purposes. Typically, British English is taught as standard across Europe, the Caribbean, sub-Saharan Africa, and South Asia, and American English is taught as standard across Latin America and East Asia. This does, however, vary between regions and individual teachers. In some areas a pidgin or creole language blends English with one or more native languages.

== Grammar ==
Although the standard Englishes of the anglophone countries are similar, there are minor grammatical differences and divergences of vocabulary among the varieties. In American and Australian English, for example, "sunk" and "shrunk" as past-tense forms of "sink" and "shrink" are acceptable as standard forms, whereas standard British English retains only the past-tense forms of "sank" and "shrank". In Afrikaner South African English, the deletion of verbal complements is becoming common. This phenomenon sees the objects of transitive verbs being omitted: "Did you get?", "You can put in the box". This kind of construction is infrequent in most other standardized varieties of English.

== Origins ==
In the past, different scholars have meant different things by the phrase "Standard English", when describing its emergence in medieval and early modern England. In the nineteenth century, it tended to be used in relation to the wordstock. Nineteenth-century scholars Earle and Kington-Oliphant conceived of the standardization of English in terms of ratios of Romance to Germanic vocabulary. Earle claimed that the works of the poets Gower and Chaucer, for instance, were written in what he called "standard language" because of their amounts of French-derived vocabulary.

Subsequently, attention shifted to the regional distribution of phonemes. Morsbach, Heuser, and Ekwall conceived of standardization largely as relating to sound-change, especially as indicated by spellings for vowels in stressed syllables, with a lesser emphasis on morphology.

Mid-twentieth-century scholars McIntosh and Samuels continued to focus on the distribution of spelling practice but as primary artefacts, which are not necessarily evidence of underlying articulatory reality. Their work led to the publication of the Linguistic Atlas of Late Mediaeval English, which aims to describe dialectal variation in Middle English between 1350 and 1450. The final date was chosen to reflect the increasing standardization of written English. Although as they note, "The dialects of the spoken language did not die out, but those of the written language did".

A number of late-twentieth-century scholars tracked morphemes as they standardized, such as auxiliary do, third-person present-tense -s, you/thou, the wh- pronouns, and single negation, multiple negations being common in Old and Middle English and remaining so in spoken regional varieties of English.

=== Present-day investigations ===
In the twenty-first century, scholars consider all of the above and more, including the rate of standardization across different text-types such as administrative documents, the role of the individual in spreading standardization, influence of multilingual and mixed-language writing, and the Book of Common Prayer, standardization of the word stock, evolution of technical registers, standardization of glyphs and morphemes, and the partial standardization of Older Scots.

=== Late West Saxon ===
After the unification of the Anglo-Saxon kingdoms by Alfred the Great and his successors, the West Saxon variety of Old English began to influence writing practices in other parts of England. The first variety of English to be called a "standard literary language" was the West Saxon variety of Old English.

However, Lucia Kornexl defines the classification of Late West Saxon Standard as rather constituting a set of orthographic norms than a standardized dialect, as there was no such thing as standardization of Old English in the modern sense: Old English did not standardise in terms of reduction of variation, reduction of regional variation, selection of word-stock, standardization of morphology or syntax, or use of one dialect for all written purposes everywhere.

The Norman Conquest of 1066 decreased the usage of Old English, but it was still used in parts of the country for at least another century.

=== Mixed language ===
Following the changes brought about by the Norman Conquest of 1066, England became a trilingual society. Literate people wrote in Medieval Latin and Anglo-Norman French much more often than monolingual English. In addition, a widely used system developed which mixed several languages together, typically with Medieval Latin as the grammatical basis, adding in nouns, noun-modifiers, compound-nouns, verb-stems and -ing forms from Anglo-Norman French and Middle English. This mixing of the three in a grammatically regular system is known to modern scholars as mixed-language, and it became the later fourteenth and fifteenth-century norm for accounts, inventories, testaments and personal journals.

The mixed-language system was abandoned over the fifteenth century, and at different times in different places, it became replaced by monolingual supralocal English, although it was not always a straightforward exchange. For example, Alcolado-Carnicero surveyed the London Mercers' Livery Company Wardens' Accounts and found that they switched back and forth for over seventy years between approximately 1390 and 1464 before finally committing to monolingual English.

Individual scribes spent whole careers in the mixed-language stage, with no knowledge that monolingual English would be the eventual outcome and that it was, in fact, a stage of transition. For much of the fourteenth and fifteenth centuries, writing in mixed-language was the professional norm in money-related text types, providing a conduit for the borrowing of Anglo-Norman vocabulary into English.

=== Middle English ===
From the 1370s, monolingual Middle English was increasingly used, mainly for local communication. Up until the later fifteenth century, it was characterised by great regional and spelling variation. After the middle of the fifteenth century, supralocal monolingual varieties of English began to evolve for numerous pragmatic functions.

Supralocalisation is where "dialect features with a limited geographical distribution are replaced by features with a wider distribution".

Over the later fifteenth century, individuals began to restrict their spelling ratios, selecting fewer variants. However, each scribe made individual selections so that the pool of possible variants per feature still remained wide at the turn of the sixteenth century. Thus, the early stage of standardization can be identified by the reduction of grammatical and orthographical variants and loss of geographically marked variants in the writing of individuals.

=== Demise of Anglo-Norman ===
The rise of written monolingual English was due to the abandonment of Anglo-Norman French between 1375 and 1425, with subsequent absorption into supralocal varieties of English of much of its word stock and many of its written conventions. Some of these conventions were to last, such as minimal spelling variation, and some were not, such as digraph ⟨lx⟩ and trigraph ⟨aun⟩.

Anglo-Norman was the variety of French that was widely used by the educated classes in late medieval England. It was used, for example, as the teaching language in grammar schools. For example, the Benedictine monk Ranulph Higden, who wrote the widely copied historical chronicle Polychronicon, remarks that, against the practice of other nations, English children learn Latin grammar in French. Ingham analysed how Anglo-Norman syntax and morphology written in Britain began to differ from Anglo-Norman syntax and morphology written on the Continent from the 1370s onwards until the language fell out of use in Britain in the 1430s.

After the last quarter of the fourteenth century Anglo-Norman written in England displayed the kind of grammatical levelling which occurs as the result of language acquired in adulthood, and deduces that the use of Anglo-Norman in England as a spoken vehicle for teaching in childhood must have ceased around the end of the fourteenth century. An examination of 7,070 Hampshire administrative (episcopal, municipal, manorial) documents written 1399–1525 showed that Anglo-Norman ceased to be used after 1425.

The pragmatic function for which Anglo-Norman had been used—largely administering money—became replaced by monolingual English or Latin. Anglo-Norman was abandoned towards the end of the fourteenth century, though the consequent absorption of many of its written features into written English paralleled the socio-economic improvement of the poorer, monolingually English-speaking classes over that century.

=== Supralocal varieties ===
When monolingual English replaced Anglo-Norman French, it took over its pragmatic functions too. A survey of the Middle English Local Documents corpus, containing 2,017 texts from 766 different locations around England written 1399–1525, found that language choice was conditioned by the readership or audience: if the text was aimed at professionals, then the text was written in Latin; if it was aimed at non-professionals, then the text was written in Anglo-Norman until the mid-fifteenth century and either Latin or English thereafter. More oral, less predictable texts were aimed at non-professionals as correspondence, ordinances, oaths, conditions of obligation, and occasional leases and sales.

The supralocal varieties of English which replaced Anglo-Norman in the late fifteenth century were still regional, but less so than fourteenth-century Middle English had been, particularly with regard to morphemes, closed-class words and spelling sequences. As some examples: less regionally-marked features "urban-hopped" in texts from Cheshire and Staffordshire ("urban-hopping" refers to texts copied in cities being more standardized than those copied in smaller towns and villages, which contained more local dialect features); a lower frequency of regionally-marked spellings were found in wills from urban York versus those from rural Swaledale; and texts from Cambridge were less regionally marked than those from the surrounding Midlands and East Anglian areas.

However, these late fifteenth- and sixteenth-century supralocal varieties of English were not yet standardized. Medieval Latin, Anglo-Norman and mixed-language set a precedent model, as Latin and French had long been conventionalised on the page and their range of variation was limited. Supralocal varieties of English took on this uniformity by reducing more regionally-marked features and permitting only one or two minor variants.

=== Transition to Standard English ===
Later fifteenth- and sixteenth-century supralocalisation was facilitated by increased trade networks.

As people in cities and towns increasingly did business with each other, words, morphemes and spelling-sequences were transferred around the country by means of speaker-contact, writer-contact and the repeat back-and-forth encounters inherent in trading activity, from places of greater density to those of lower. Communities of practice such as accountants auditing income and outgoings, merchants keeping track of wares and payments, and lawyers writing letters on behalf of clients, led to the development of specific writing conventions for specific spheres of activity. English letter-writers 1424–1474 in one community of practice (estate administrators) reduced spelling variation in words of Romance origin but not in words of English origin, reflecting the pragmatics of law and administration, which had previously been the domain of Anglo-Norman and mixed-language.

This shows that the reduction of variation in supralocal varieties of English was due to the influence of Anglo-Norman and mixed-language: when English took over their pragmatic roles, it also took on their quality of spelling uniformity. Members of the gentry and professionals, in contradistinction to the nobility and lower commoners, were the main users of French suffixes in a survey of the Parsed Corpus of Early English Correspondence, 1410–1681.

This finding that the middling classes uptook French elements into English first is in keeping with estate administrators' reduction of spelling variation in words of French origin: in both cases, the literate professional classes ported Anglo-Norman writing conventions into their English.

Standard English was not to settle into its present form until the early nineteenth century. It contains elements from different geographical regions, "an urban amalgam drawing on non-adjacent dialects".

Examples of multiregional morphemes are auxiliary do from south-western dialects and third-person present tense -s and plural are from northern ones. An example of multiregional spelling is provided by the reflex of Old English /y(:)/ – Old English /y(:)/ was written as ⟨i⟩ in the north and north-east Midlands, ⟨u⟩ in the south and south-west Midlands, and ⟨e⟩ in the south-east and south-east Midlands. Standard English retains multiregional ⟨i, u, e⟩ spellings such as cudgel (Old English cycgel), bridge (Old English brycg), merry (Old English myrig).

Unlike earlier twentieth-century histories of standardization, it is no longer felt necessary to posit unevidenced migrations of peoples to account for movement of words, morphemes and spelling conventions from the provinces into Standard English. Such multiregionalisms in Standard English are explained by the fifteenth-century countrywide expansion of business, trade and commerce, with linguistic elements passed around communities of practice and along weak-tie trade networks, both orally and in writing.

== Superseded explanations ==
Although the following hypotheses have now been superseded, they still prevail in literature aimed at students. However more recent handbook accounts such as those of Ursula Schaeffer and Joan C. Beal explain that they are insufficient.

=== A. East Midlands ===
Bror Eilert Ekwall hypothesised that Standard English developed from the language of upper-class East Midland merchants who influenced speakers in the City of London. By language, Ekwall stipulated just certain ⟨a⟩ graphs and ⟨e⟩ letter-graphs in stressed syllables, present plural suffix -e(n, present participle suffix -ing, and pronoun they, which he thought could not be East Saxon and so must be from eastern Anglian territory. He, therefore, examined locative surnames in order to discover whether people bearing names originating from settlements in the East Midlands (in which he included East Anglia) migrated to London between the Norman Conquest of 1066 and 1360. By this method, he found that most Londoners who bore surnames from elsewhere indicated an origin in London's hinterland, not from East Anglia or the East Midlands.

Nevertheless, he hypothesised that East Midlands upper-class speakers did affect the speech of the upper classes in London. He thought that upper-class speech would have been influential, although he also suggested influence from the Danelaw in general. Thus his dataset was very limited, by "standard" he meant a few spellings and morphemes rather than a dialect per se, his data did not support migration from the East Midlands, and he made unsupported assumptions about the influence of the speech of the upper classes.

=== B. Central Midlands ===
Michael Louis Samuels criticised Ekwall's East Midlands hypothesis. He shifted Ekwall's hypothesis from the East to the Central Midlands, he classified late medieval London and other texts into Types I-IV, and he introduced the label "Chancery Standard" to describe writing from the King's Office of Chancery, which he claimed was the precursor of Standard English.

Samuels did not question Ekwall's original assumption that there must have been a migration from somewhere north of London to account for certain ⟨a⟩ graphs and ⟨e⟩ letter-graphs in stressed syllables, present plural suffix -e(n, present participle suffix -ing, and pronoun they in fifteenth-century London texts, but his work for the Linguistic Atlas of Late Mediaeval English did not support the possibility of an East Anglian or East Midland migration, and he replaced it by hypothesising a migration of people from the Central Midlands, although without historical evidence. Like Ekwall, Samuels was not dogmatic and presented his work as preliminary.

=== C. Types I–IV ===
Samuels classified fifteenth century manuscripts into four types. These divisions have subsequently proved problematical, partly because Samuels did not specify exactly which manuscripts fall into which class, and partly because other scholars do not see inherent cohesiveness within each type. Matti Peikola, examining Type 1 ("Central Midland Standard") spelling ratios in the orthography of 68 hands who wrote manuscripts of the Later Version of the Wycliffite Bible, concluded: "it is difficult to sustain a 'grand unifying theory' about Central Midland Standard".

Jacob Thaisen, analysing the orthography of texts forming Type 2 found no consistent similarities between different scribes' spelling choices and no obvious overlap of selection signalling incipient standardization, concluding "it is time to lay the types to rest". Simon Horobin, examining spelling in Type 3 texts reported "such variation warns us against viewing these types of London English as discrete... we must view Samuels' typology as a linguistic continuum rather than as a series of discrete linguistic varieties".

=== D. Chancery Standard ===
Samuels's Type IV, dating after 1435, was labelled by Samuels "Chancery Standard" because it was supposedly the dialect in which letters from the King's Office of Chancery supposedly emanated.

John H. Fisher and his collaborators asserted that the orthography of a selection of documents including Signet Letters of Henry V, copies of petitions sent to the Court of Chancery, and indentures now kept in The National Archives, constituted what he called "Chancery English". This orthographical practice was supposedly created by the government of Henry V, and was supposedly the precursor of Standard English. However, this assertion attracted strong objections, such as those made by Norman Davis, T. Haskett, R. J. Watts, and Reiko Takeda. Takeda points out that "the language of the documents displays much variation and it is not clear from the collection what exactly 'Chancery English' is, linguistically". For a critique of Fisher's philological work, see Michael Benskin 2004, who calls his scholarship "uninformed not only philologically but historically".

Gwilym Dodd has shown that most letters written by scribes from the Office of Chancery were in Medieval Latin and that petitions to the Crown shifted from Anglo-Norman French before c. 1425 to monolingual English around the middle of the century. Scribes working for the Crown wrote in Latin, but scribes working for individuals petitioning the king – it is likely that individuals engaged professionals to write on their behalf, but who these scribes were is not usually known – wrote in French before the first third of the fifteenth century, and after that date in English. As with mixed-language writing, there followed decades of switching back and forth before the Crown committed to writing in monolingual English so that the first English royal letter of 1417 did not signal a wholesale switchover.

Latin was still the dominant language in the second half of the fifteenth century. As Merja Stenroos put it, "the main change was the reduction in the use of French, and the long-term development was towards more Latin, not less. On the whole, the output of government documents in English continued to be small compared to Latin."

== Vocabulary ==
Comparing the vocabularies of British English, American English, and Australian English provides an illustration of the ways that a Standard English can be influenced.

American English	British English	Australian English
sidewalk	pavement	footpath
bell pepper	red/green pepper	capsicum
comforter	duvet	doona
truck	lorry	truck
eggplant	aubergine	eggplant
hood	bonnet	bonnet
cell phone	mobile phone	mobile phone
(potato) chip	crisp	chip
(French) fry	chip	chip
wrench	spanner	spanner
sweater	jumper	jumper
elevator	lift	lift
bathroom	toilet	toilet

== Spelling ==
With rare exceptions, Standard English uses either American or British spelling systems, or crossing between the two (such as in Australian English and Canadian English). British spellings usually dominate in Commonwealth countries.

== See also ==
- Standard language
- Comparison of American and British English
- International English
- Modern English
- World Englishes
