= Nishan (Sikhism) =

Type of Sikh calligraphy

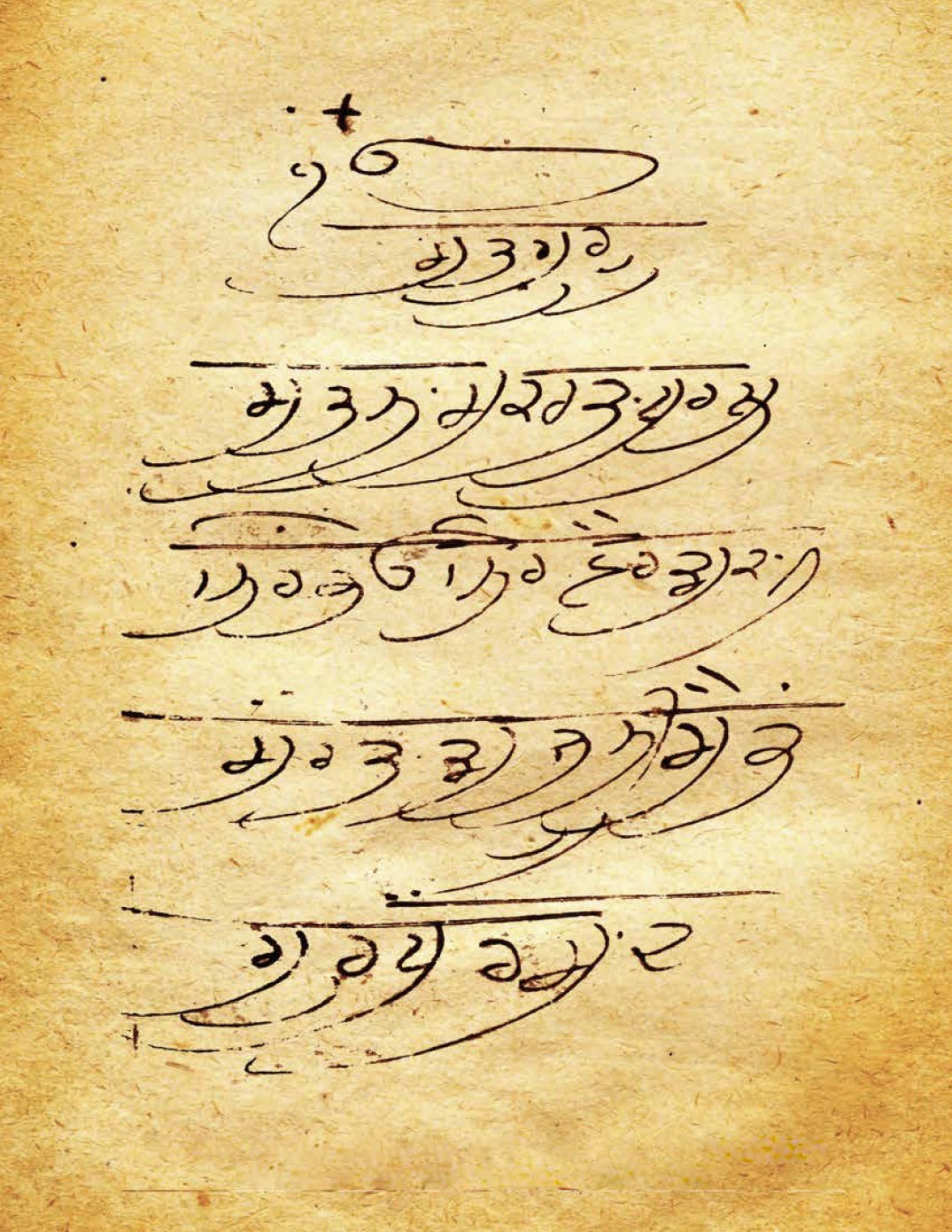
Nishan consisting of the Mul Mantar by Guru Gobind Singh, from a historical Guru Granth Sahib manuscript preserved at Takht Sri Harmandir Ji in Patna, Bihar, India

A Nishan, also spelt Nisan, is a type of calligraphic Sikh art produced by the Sikh gurus and other historical Sikhs. (Note: The word nishan (also spelt as nisan) comes from a Persian word meaning "sign" or "emblem". In the Sikh tradition, it is used to refer to the signature or autograph of a highly-reputed religious figure, such as a Sikh guru, often by scribing the Mul Mantar.) It usually consists of the Mul Mantar being scribed in a calligraphic Gurmukhi font, usually found in the opening section of historical manuscripts of Sikh scriptures, perhaps as an authentication measure. Nishans attributed to the gurus Arjan, Hargobind, Har Rai, Tegh Bahadur, and Gobind Singh have been identified and dated between 1600 and 1708.

== See also ==
- Anandpur Lipi
