= Battle of Anandpur =

Battle of Anandpur can refer to these battles at Anandpur Sahib, Punjab, India:

- Battle of Anandpur (1682), fought between the armies of the Sikh guru Gobind Singh and the state of Kahlur forces in 1682
- Battle of Anandpur (1699), fought between the Sikh forces led by Gobind Singh and the Hill State forces by Alim and Balia Chand in 1699
- Battle of Anandpur (1700), fought between the armies of Gobind Singh and the Mughal forces in 1700
- First siege of Anandpur, fought between the armies of Gobind Singh and an allied force of the Rajas of the Sivalik Hills in 1700
- First Battle of Anandpur (1704), fought between the armies of Gobind Singh and Mughals forces who were supported by the Rajas of the Sivalik Hills in 1704
- Second siege of Anandpur, fought between the armies of Gobind Singh and an allied force of the Rajas of the Sivalik Hills in 1704
- Battle of Anandpur (1753), fought by the Sikh forces led by Jassa Singh Ahluwalia and Mughal forces led by Adina Beg in 1753
- Battle of Anandpur (1812), fought between the armies of Sodhi Surjan Singh and the Rajput forces of Kahlur led by Raja Mahan Chand in 1812

== See also ==
- Anandpur (disambiguation)
