= Nonthaburi (disambiguation) =

Nonthaburi is a city in Thailand.

Nonthaburi may also refer to:

- Nonthaburi province, a province of Thailand
- Mueang Nonthaburi district, the capital district of Nonthaburi Province, Thailand

== See also ==
- Anandpur (disambiguation)
