= Ardhanagari =

Brahmic script

Ardhanagari (also: Arddhanagari, Bhatachhari, or Bhattachari), an abugida, was a mixture of Nagari, used in Malwa, particularly Ujjain, and Siddha Matrika or the Siddham script, a variant of the Sharada script used in Kashmir. In northwest India, the script was used in Bathinda, Sindh, and Western Punjab. It is one of the proponent scripts that Gurmukhi is theorized as being derived from, which is argued by G. B. Singh. The script was mentioned by Al-Biruni:

"The alphabet used for Sindhi language in Southern Sindh towards sea- coast, was 'Malwari. In Bahmanva (al- Mansurah), 'Saindhva Script' was most commonly used. Lari writing system was in use in Lar Desha, whereas 'Ardhanagari Script' was commonly used by the people of Bhatia area and other parts of Sindh."
