= Anandpur Lipi =

Calligraphic style of Gurmukhi associated with Guru Gobind Singh and his entourage

Anandpur Lipi Anandpuri Lipi ਆਨੰਦਪੁਰ ਲਿਪੀ
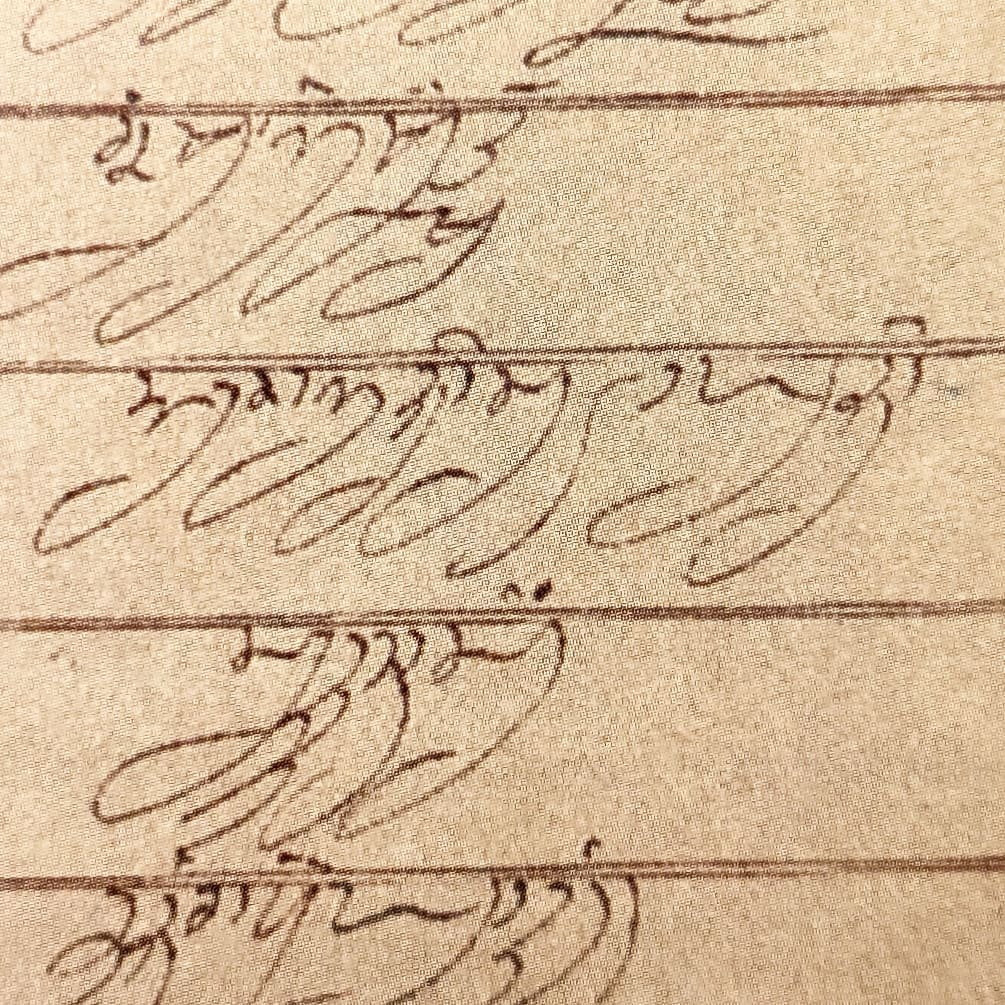
- Detailed example of calligraphic Gurmukhi (Anandpur Lipi) in the hand of Guru Gobind Singh, from a manuscript held in the Bhai Rupa Collection
- Script type: Abugida
- Period: 1670's–Unknown
- Languages: Sant Bhasha

Related scripts
- Parent systems: Egyptian: Proto-Sinaitic; Phoenician; Aramaic; Brahmi script; Gupta; Sharada; disputed; Gurmukhi; Anandpur Lipi

Anandpur Lipi (Punjabi: ਆਨੰਦਪੁਰ ਲਿਪੀ; also known as Anandpuri Lipi or Shehkasteh) is a calligraphic (Punjabi: Shikasta (Note: Alternatively transcribed as "shiksata".)) style of the Gurmukhi script associated with Guru Gobind Singh. It is commonly found among early manuscripts of the Dasam Granth scripture as the employed script.

== Features ==
The font is characterized by "long flowing animated strokes".

== History ==
=== Origin ===
According to Sikhologist Gurinder Singh Mann, Anandpur Lipi first appears in the decade of the 1670's, developing further in the following three decades after. Surviving examples of the font can be found on copper plates and scriptural manuscripts from the time-period. The script was used in Hukamnama edicts, Khas Patra ('important pages') found within historical Dasam Granth manuscripts, and on the inscribed copper plate gifted to the Naina Devi temple by the tenth guru. In early Dasam Granth manuscripts, the calligraphic font is employed alongside regular, non-calligraphic Gurmukhi writing. The development of its physical appearance may have been influenced by Persian.

=== Decline ===
After Guru Gobind Singh, the style of writing was not continued by his wives or his followers who survived him.

=== Decipherment ===
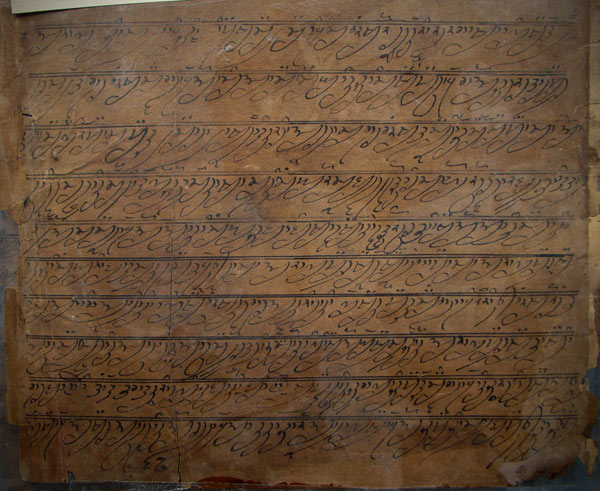
Page from the Anandpuri Marco Bir

In 1963, the late Sikh scholar Manohar Singh Marco rediscovered a historical Sikh scripture, which came to be known as the Anandpuri Bir. The manuscript was rediscovered in a highly-decayed condition in the home of Pandit Om Prakash in Anandpur Sahib. It was found lying amid other historical, handwritten texts. The manuscript was written in the calligraphic Anandpur Lipi font. Marco would later devise a key to decipher the glyphs of the calligraphic font and match each glyph to their modern-Gurmukhi counterpart. He accomplished this by separating each glyph individually. A pamphlet was published by the Delhi Gurdware Parbandak Committee to inform the Sikh congregation about the discovering of the manuscript and its deciphering. The manuscript used to decipher the script has since been conserved, restored, microfilmed, and digitized.

== See also ==
- Nishan (Sikhism)
