= Anandpur Kalu =

- rural
- Nickname: Kalu
- Location in Rajasthan, India Anandpur Kalu (India)
- Coordinates: 26.3667°N 73.9833°E
- Country: India
- State: Rajasthan
- District: Pali
- Elevation: 307 m (1,007 ft)

Population (2001)
  - Total: 13,326

Languages
  - Official: Hindi
- Time zone: UTC+5:30 (IST)
- PIN: 306301
- Telephone code: 02939
- Vehicle registration: RJ-22
- Sex ratio: 949 ♂/♀

Anandpur Kalu is a village in Jaitaran tehsil of Pali district in the Indian state of Rajasthan.

== Geography ==
Anandpur Kalu is located at 26.3667°N 73.9833°E. It has an average elevation of 307 metres (1007 feet).

== Demographics ==
As of 2011 India census, Anandpur Kalu had a population of 8,334. Males constitute 51% (4,276) of the population and females 49% (4,058). The mother tongues are Rajasthani and Hindi. Men wear mainly safa and women wear lahnga.
