= Anandpur, Vikramgad =

Village in Maharashtra

Anandpur
- village
- Location in Maharashtra, India Anandpur (India)
- Coordinates: 19.8607374°N 73.0139616°E
- Country: India
- State: Maharashtra
- District: Palghar
- Taluka: Vikramgad
- Elevation: 163 m (535 ft)

Population (2011)
  - Total: 687
- Time zone: UTC+5:30 (IST)
- 2011 census code: 551774

Anandpur is a village in the Palghar district of Maharashtra, India. It is located in the Vikramgad taluka.

== Demographics ==
According to the 2011 census of India, Anandpur has 134 households. The effective literacy rate (i.e. the literacy rate of population excluding children aged 6 and below) is 49.65%.

Demographics (2011 Census)
	Total	Male	Female
Population	687	349	338
Children aged below 6 years	117	65	52
Scheduled caste	0	0	0
Scheduled tribe	686	349	337
Literates	283	172	111
Workers (all)	449	221	228
Main workers (total)	412	202	210
Main workers: Cultivators	245	120	125
Main workers: Agricultural labourers	158	74	84
Main workers: Household industry workers	1	1	0
Main workers: Other	8	7	1
Marginal workers (total)	37	19	18
Marginal workers: Cultivators	18	9	9
Marginal workers: Agricultural labourers	11	5	6
Marginal workers: Household industry workers	0	0	0
Marginal workers: Others	8	5	3
Non-workers	238	128	110
