= Anandapur, Bangladesh =

- Location in Bangladesh
- Coordinates: 23°14′N 91°0′E
- Country: Bangladesh
- Division: Chittagong Division
- District: Chandpur District
- Time zone: UTC+6 (Bangladesh Time)

Anandapur, Bangladesh is a village in Chandpur District in the Chittagong Division of eastern Bangladesh.
