= Gurmukhi =

Script used to write the Punjabi language

Gurmukhī ਗੁਰਮੁਖੀ
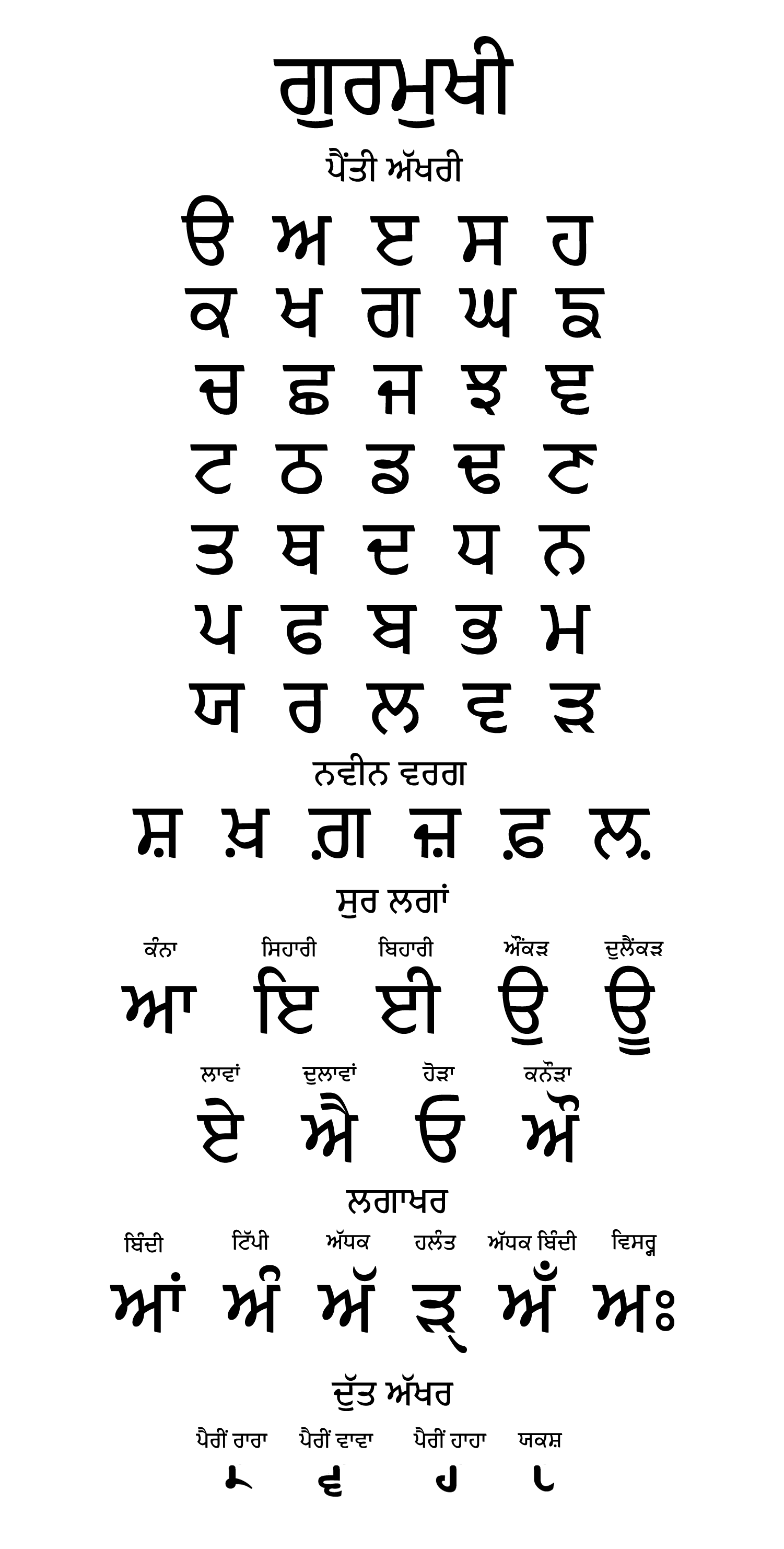
- Gurmukhi letter set divided into 35 original letters (ਪੈਂਤੀ ਅੱਖਰੀ), 6 additional consonants (ਨਵੀਨ ਵਰਗ), 9 vowel diacritics (ਸੁਰ ਲਗਾਂ), 3 special diacritic marks (ਲਗਾਖਰ), 3 historical diacritic marks, and 4 subscript letters (ਦੁੱਤ ਅੱਖਰ)
- Script type: Abugida
- Period: 16th century CE-present
- Direction: Left-to-right
- Languages: Punjabi; Punjabi dialects; Sant Bhasha (historical); Sindhi (historical); Braj (historical)

Related scripts
- Parent systems: Egyptian hieroglyphs: Proto-Sinaitic; Phoenician; Aramaic; Brahmi; Gupta; Sharada; disputed; Gurmukhī
- Child systems: Anandpur Lipi
- Sister systems: Khudabadi, Khojki, Mahajani, Multani

ISO 15924
- ISO 15924: Guru (310), Gurmukhi

Unicode
- Unicode alias: Gurmukhi
- Unicode range: U+0A00–U+0A7F

Gurmukhī (Punjabi: ਗੁਰਮੁਖੀ [ˈɡʊɾᵊmʊkʰiː], Shahmukhi: گُرمُکھی) is an abugida popularly believed to have been standardized and used by the second Sikh guru, Guru Angad (1504–1552). Although some scholars trace its development to before Guru Angad. Commonly regarded as a Sikh script, Gurmukhi is used in Punjab, India as the official script of the Punjabi language. Historically, it was also used for Sindhi.

Its use by the Sikhs is attested from the early 16th century onwards. The primary scripture of Sikhism, the Guru Granth Sahib, is written in Gurmukhī, in various dialects and languages often subsumed under the generic title Sant Bhasha or "saint language", in addition to other languages like Persian and various phases of Indo-Aryan languages. Modern Gurmukhī has thirty-five original letters, hence its common alternative term paintī or "the thirty-five", plus six additional consonants, nine vowel diacritics, two diacritics for nasal sounds, one diacritic that geminates consonants and three subscript characters.

== Etymology ==
The prevalent view among Punjabi linguists is that as in the early stages the Gurmukhī letters were primarily used by the Guru's followers, gurmukhs (literally, those who face, or follow, the Guru); the script thus came to be known as gurmukhī, "the script of those guided by the Guru." A further expansion on this theory is that the Gurmukhs revered the script and meditated on the glyphs used to write Waheguru, explicitly ਵ, ਹ, ਗ, and ਰ, with this set of four characters originally being called Gurmukhi, later the term's meaning expanded to include the entire script.

Although the word Gurmukhī has been commonly translated as "from the mouth of the Guru", the term used for the Punjabi script has somewhat different connotations. This usage of the term may have gained currency from the use of the script to record the utterances of the Sikh Gurus as scripture, which were often referred to as Gurmukhī, or from the mukhă (face, or mouth) of the Gurus. Consequently, the script that was used to write the resulting scripture may have also been designated with the same name.

The name for the Perso–Arabic alphabet for the Punjabi language, Shahmukhi, was modeled on the term Gurmukhī.

== History and development ==
=== Antecedents ===
The Gurmukhī script is generally believed to have roots in the Proto-Sinaitic alphabet by way of the Brahmi script, which developed further into the Northwestern group (Sharada-based), the Central group (Nagari-based) and the Eastern group (Siddhaṃ-based), as well as several prominent writing systems of Southeast Asia, in addition to scripts used historically in Central Asia for extinct languages like Saka and Tocharian. Gurmukhi is derived from Sharada in the Northwestern group, of which it is the only major surviving member, with full modern currency. Notable features include:

- It is an abugida in which all consonants have an inherent vowel, [ə]. Diacritics, which can appear above, below, before or after the consonant they are applied to, are used to change the inherent vowel.
- When they appear at the beginning of a syllable, vowels are written as independent letters.
- To form consonant clusters, Gurmukhi uniquely affixes subscript letters at the bottom of standard characters, rather than using the true conjunct symbols used by other scripts, which merge parts of each letter into a distinct character of its own.
- Punjabi is a tonal language with three tones. These are indicated in writing using the formerly voiced aspirated consonants (gh, dh, bh, etc.) and the intervocalic h.

=== Origin ===
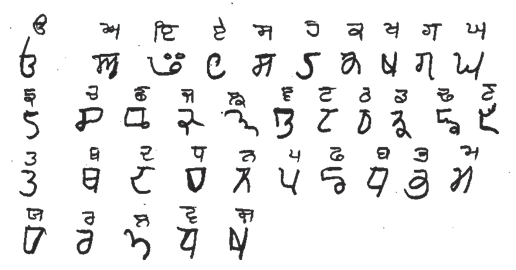
Pictorial depiction of Proto-Gurmukhi script (13th century) with current glyphs displayed above each character

There are various theories regarding the origin of Gurmukhi, with most agreeing that Gurmukhi ultimately originated from Sharada but differing in regards to which intermediary script between Gurmukhi and Sharada that Gurmukhi was immediately derived from. The theories are as follows:

- it derived from Devāśeṣa script, argued by Tarlochan Singh Bedi
- it derived from Ardhanagari, a script used in Bathinda, Sindh, and Western Punjab, argued by G. B. Singh
- it derived from Landa scripts
- it derived from Takri scripts
- Other theories posit connections to Devanagari and Siddham/Siddhamatrika

Phoenician	𐤀	𐤁		𐤂	𐤃		𐤄	𐤅	𐤆				𐤇		𐤈		𐤉	𐤊		𐤋	𐤌	𐤍				𐤎	𐤏	𐤐		𐤑	𐤒		𐤓	𐤔	𐤕	
Aramaic	𐡀	𐡁		𐡂	𐡃		𐡄	𐡅	𐡆				𐡇		𐡈		𐡉	𐡊		𐡋	𐡌	𐡍				𐡎	𐡏	𐡐		𐡑	𐡒		𐡓	𐡔	𐡕	
Brahmi	𑀅	𑀩	𑀪	𑀕	𑀥	𑀠	𑀏	𑀯	𑀤	𑀟	𑀚	𑀛	𑀳	𑀖	𑀣	𑀞	𑀬	𑀓	𑀘	𑀮	𑀫	𑀦	𑀗	𑀜	𑀡	𑀰	𑀑	𑀧	𑀨	𑀲	𑀔	𑀙	𑀭	𑀱	𑀢	𑀝
Gurmukhi	ਅ	ਬ	ਭ	ਗ	ਧ	ਢ	ੲ	ਵ	ਦ	ਡ	ਜ	ਝ	ਹ	ਘ	ਥ	ਠ	ਯ	ਕ	ਚ	ਲ	ਮ	ਨ	ਙ	ਞ	ਣ	(ਸ਼)	ੳ	ਪ	ਫ	ਸ	ਖ	ਛ	ਰ	ਖ	ਤ	ਟ
IAST	a	ba	bha	ga	dha	ḍha	ē	va	da	ḍa	ja	jha	ha	gha	tha	ṭha	ya	ka	ca	la	ma	na	ṅa	ña	ṇa	śa*	ō	pa	pha	sa	kha	cha	ra	ṣa*	ta	ṭa
Greek	Α	Β		Γ	Δ		Ε	Ϝ	Ζ				Η		Θ		Ι	Κ		Λ	Μ	Ν				Ξ	Ο	Π		Ϻ	Ϙ		Ρ	Σ	Τ	
Possible derivation of Gurmukhi from earlier writing systems. (Note: The Gurmukhi character ਖ [kha] may have originally evolved from the Brahmi character denoting [ṣa], as the Sanskrit sounds /ʂə/ and /kʰə/ merged into /kʰə/ in Punjabi. Any phonemic contrast was lost, with no distinct character for [ṣa] remaining. Similarly, the characters representing /sə/ and /ʃə/ may have also converged into the character representing /ʃə/ as the sounds merged into /sə/.; The predecessor of the Gurmukhi character ੜ [ṛa] was derived at a subsequent point, likely around the period of the Laṇḍā scripts, as preceding scripts lacked a character for this sound. It may ultimately share a mutual parent character with Gurmukhi ਡ [ḍa].) The Greek alphabet, also descended from Phoenician, is included for comparison.

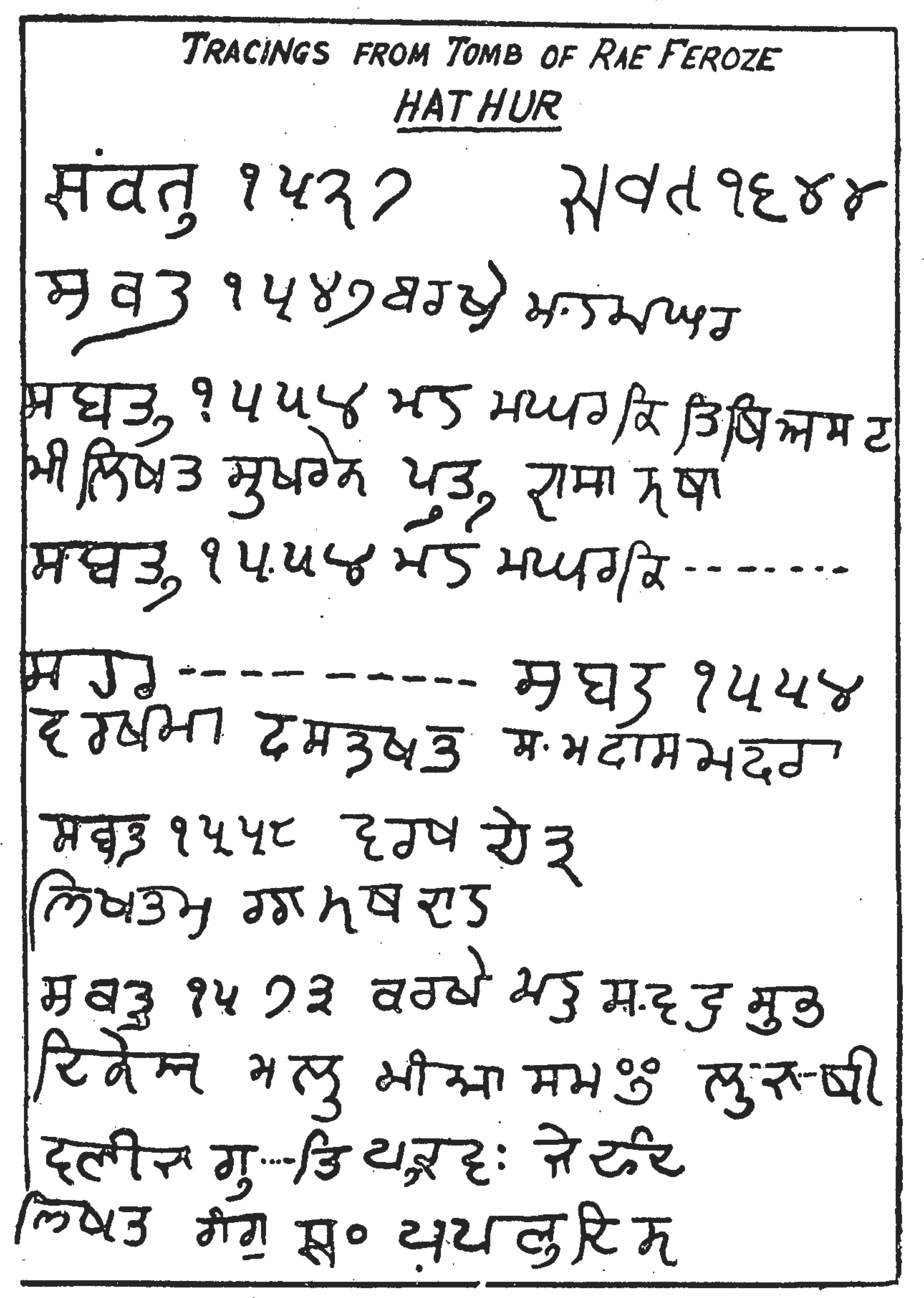
Proto-Gurmukhī writing dated to c. 1470–1490 from the tomb of Rae Feroze in Hathur, Ludhiana, Punjab.

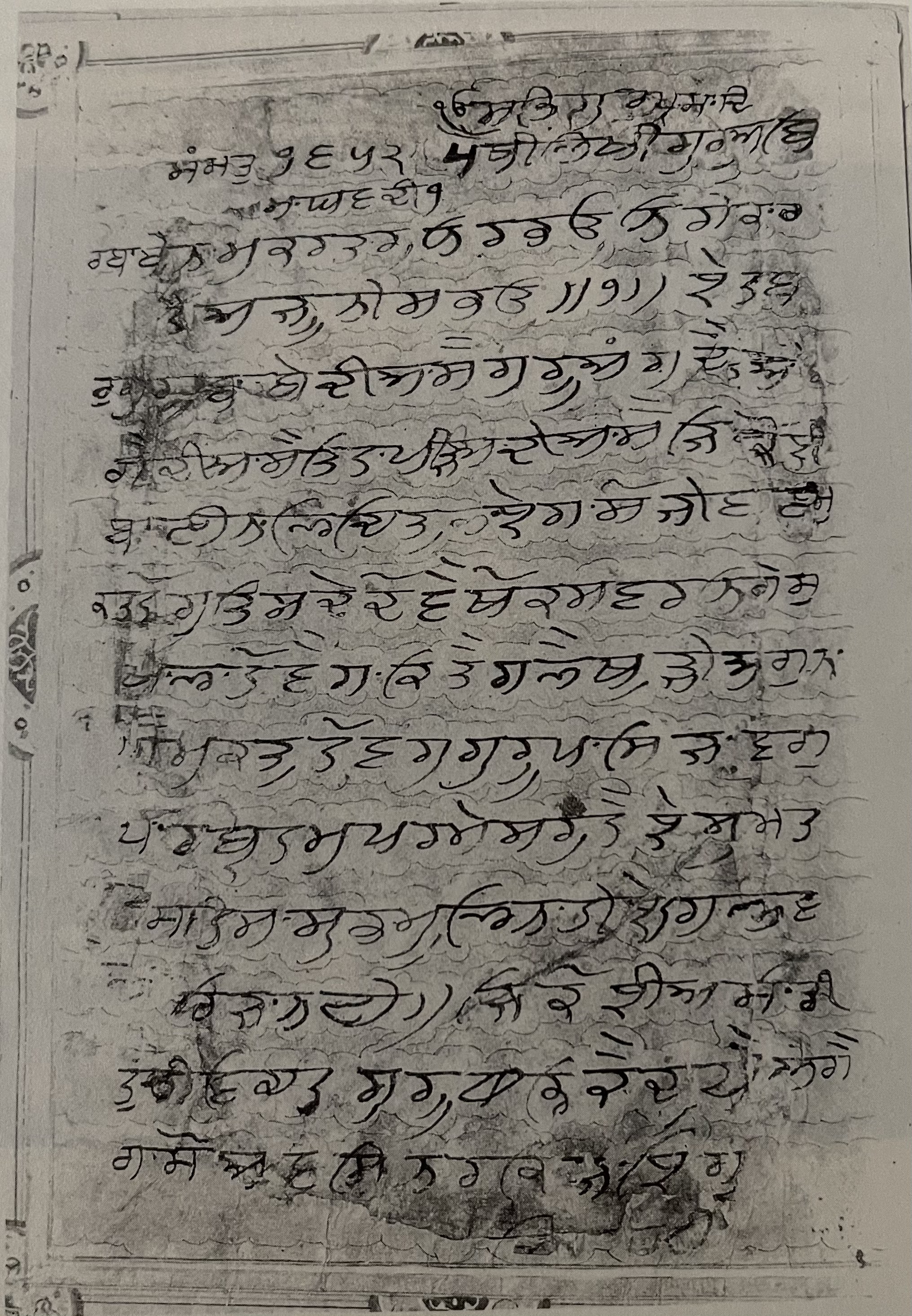
A transcription of a Goindwal pothī, or produced text excerpt of Sikh scripture or auxiliary writings, carried out by Sahansar Ram, Guru Amar Das' grandson, c. late 16th century. It showcases an early form of the Gurmukhi script with affinities to other Laṇḍā scripts.

Gurmukhi evolved in cultural and historical circumstances notably different from other regional scripts, for the purpose of recording scriptures of Sikhism, a far less Sanskritized cultural tradition than others of the subcontinent. This independence from the Sanskritic model allowed it the freedom to evolve unique orthographical features. These include:

- Three basic bearer vowels, integrated into the traditional Gurmukhi character set, using the vowel diacritics to write independent vowels, instead of distinctly separate characters for each of these vowels as in other scripts;
- a drastic reduction in the number and importance of conjunct characters (similar to Brahmi, the letters of which Gurmukhi letters have remained more similar to than those of Nagari have, and characteristic of Northwestern abugidas);
- a unique standard ordering of characters that somewhat diverges from the traditional vargiya, or Sanskritic, ordering of characters, including vowels and fricatives being placed in front;
- the recognition of Indo-Aryan phonological history through the omission of characters representing the sibilants [ʃ] and [ʂ], retaining only the letters representing sounds of the spoken language of the time; these sibilants were naturally lost in most modern Indo-Aryan languages, though such characters were often retained in their respective consonant inventories as placeholders and archaisms while being mispronounced. These sibilants were often variously reintroduced through later circumstances, as [ʃ] was to Gurmukhi, necessitating a new glyph;
- the development of distinct new letters for sounds better reflecting the vernacular language spoken during the time of its development (e.g. for [ɽ], and the sound shift that merged Sanskrit [ʂ] and /kʰ/ to Punjabi /kʰ/);
- a gemination diacritic, a unique feature among native subcontinental scripts, which serve to indicate the preserved Middle Indo-Aryan geminates distinctive of Punjabi;

and other features.

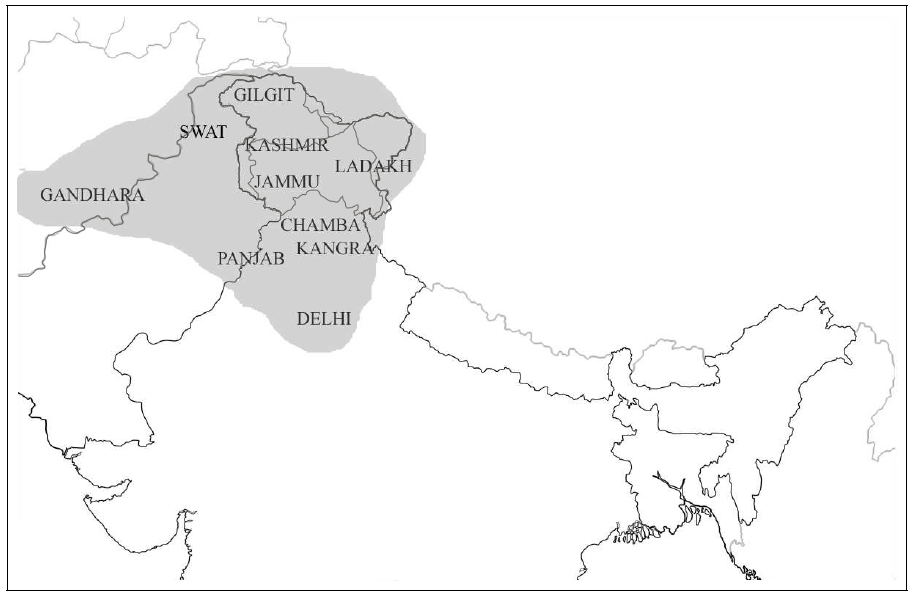
Historical geographical distribution of Sharada script

From the 10th century onwards, regional differences started to appear between the Sharada script used in Punjab, the Hill States (partly Himachal Pradesh) and Kashmir. Sharada proper was eventually restricted to very limited ceremonial use in Kashmir, as it grew increasingly unsuitable for writing the Kashmiri language. With the last known inscription dating to 1204 C.E., the early 13th century marks a milestone in the development of Sharada. The regional variety in Punjab continued to evolve from this stage through the 14th century; during this period it starts to appear in forms closely resembling Gurmukhī and other Landa scripts. By the 15th century, Sharada had evolved so considerably that epigraphists denote the script at this point by a special name, Dēvāśēṣa. Tarlochan Singh Bedi (1999) prefers the name prithamă gurmukhī, or Proto-Gurmukhī. Chatterjee (1963) noted that in 17th century Punjab, the scripts being used were Perso-Arabic, Nagari, and Gurmukhi. G. B. Singh (1981) argues that the script existed prior to its adoption by the Sikhs.

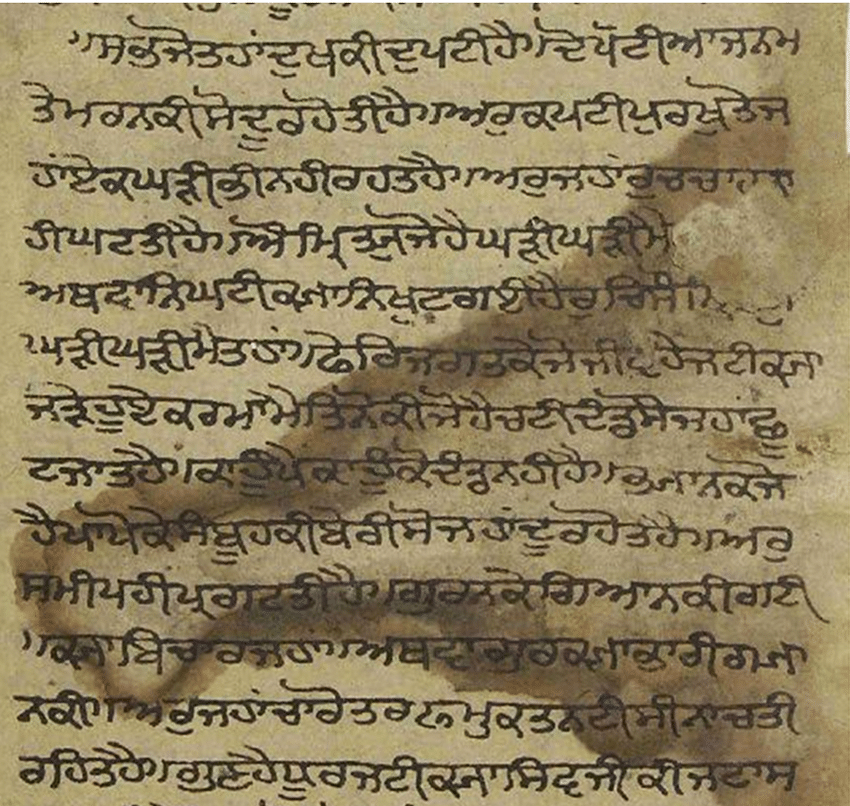
A sample of a mediaeval, handwritten Gurmukhi document

Meanwhile, the mercantile scripts of Punjab known as the Laṇḍā scripts were normally not used for literary purposes. Laṇḍā means alphabet "without tail", implying that the script did not have vowel symbols. In Punjab, there were at least ten different scripts classified as Laṇḍā, Mahajani being the most popular. The Laṇḍā scripts were used for household and trade purposes. In contrast to Laṇḍā, the use of vowel diacritics was made obligatory in Gurmukhī for increased accuracy and precision, due to the difficulties involved in deciphering words without vowel signs. The glyphs ਅ, ਹ, ਚ, ਦ, ਣ, and ਲ experienced minor orthographical changes before 1610. Major changes involved the ਙ and ਞ characters and the ਬ was a later invention.

=== Sikhism ===
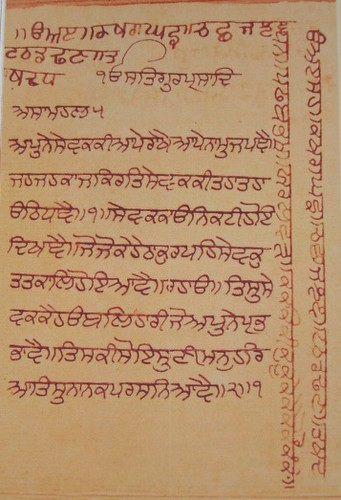
Adi Granth folio scribed by Guru Arjan with the original 35 letters (paintī) plus vowel, nasalization, and punctuation diacritics of the Gurmukhī script at the top and right side of the page

Guru Nanak was born into a mercantile family, meaning he would have been familiar with local scripts that were employed by such merchant and scribal communities in northwest India at the time, namely the Mahajan, Kayastha, and Khatris. The Sikh gurus adopted Proto-Gurmukhī to write the Guru Granth Sahib, the religious scriptures of the Sikhs. It was through its recording in Gurmukhi that knowledge of the pronunciation and grammar of the Old Punjabi language (c. 10th–16th century) was preserved for modern philologists. It has been described as being "tailor-made" to writing the Punjabi language as it existed in the 16th century. The adoption of a distinct script was an assertion of a separate religious identity. As part of the adoption by the Sikhs, the characters ਸ and ਹ were shifted to the first line and ੳ was made the first letter.

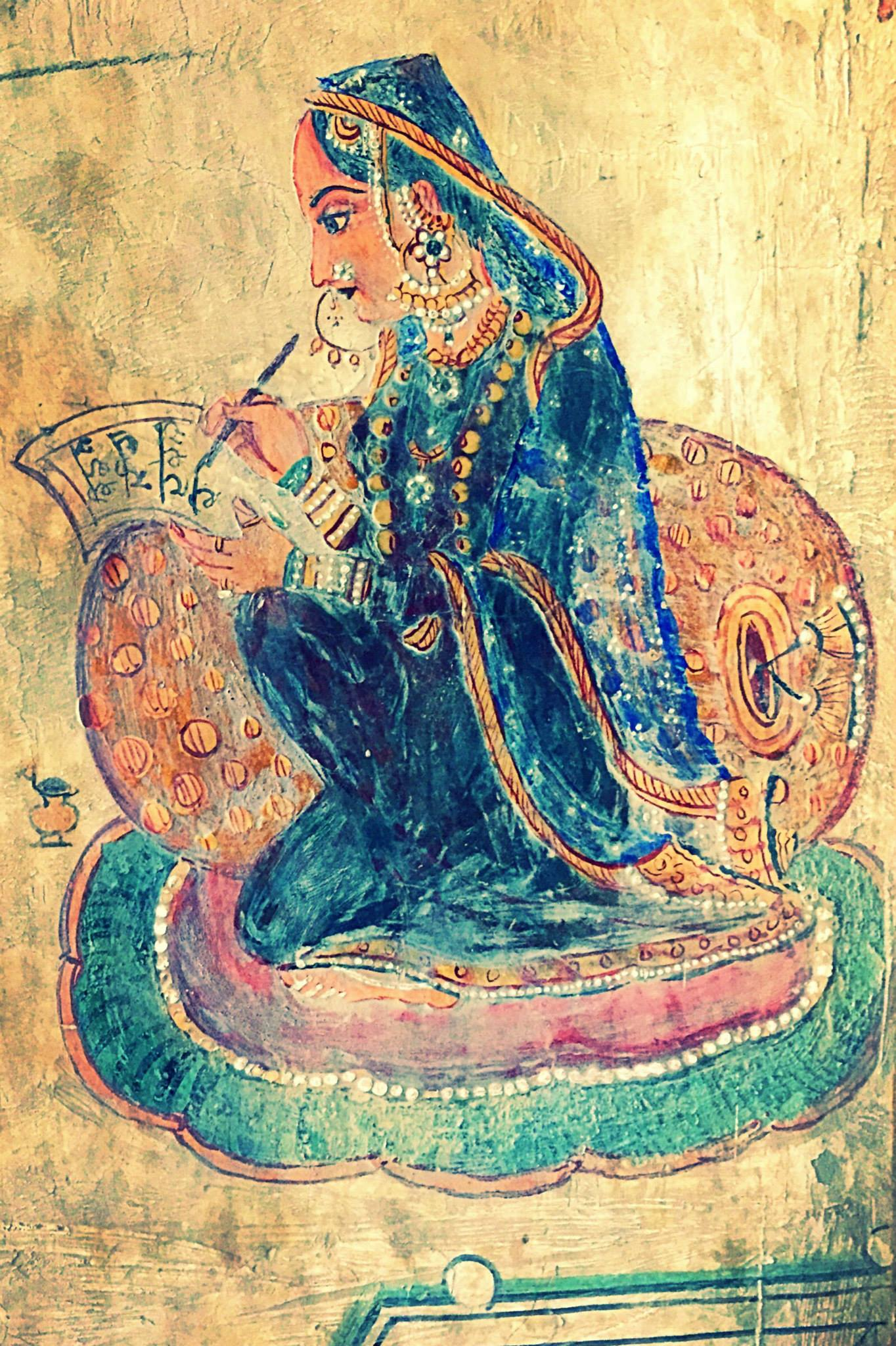
18th century fresco of a woman writing in Gurmukhī from Pothimala, Guru Harsahai, Punjab.

The original Sikh scriptures and most of the historic Sikh literature have been written in the Gurmukhi script, for which the script is revered by Sikhs. Guru Angad is popularly credited in the Sikh tradition with the creation and standardization of Gurmukhi script from earlier Śāradā-descended scripts native to the region. Whilst the creation of the Gurmukhi script is commonly attributed to the second guru of the Sikhs, Guru Angad, according to Mangat Bhardwaj the Gurmukhi script or its antecedents pre-date the development of Sikhism by several centuries. Sikh scholars themselves, such as Kahn Singh of Nabha (1930), G. B. Singh (1950), Piara Singh Padam (1954), and G. S. Sidhu (2004), have documented Gurmukhi prior to the arising of Sikhism. The glyphs and symbols employed in Gurmukhi pre-date Sikhism and it is more likely that Guru Angad standardized the pre-existing scripts around 1530–1535 to create the standard Gurmukhi script under the purview of Guru Nanak.

In the following epochs, Gurmukhī became the primary script for the literary writings of the Sikhs. Playing a significant role in Sikh faith and tradition, it expanded from its original use for Sikh scriptures and developed its own orthographical rules, spreading widely under the Sikh Empire and used by Sikh kings and chiefs of Punjab for administrative purposes. In seventeenth and eighteenth-century Punjab, the script was also employed to write scientific and poetic literature from both Sanskritic and Persian traditions in the Braj language. Helping to foster a distinct Sikh culture and contributing to the consolidation of the Sikh religion, expanding from its original role as the vehicle of Sikh religious literature, Gurmukhi became particularly important in the eighteenth and nineteenth centuries when the Sikhs established political hegemony over Punjab and Kashmir. Also playing a major role in consolidating and standardizing the Punjabi language, it served as the main medium of literacy in Punjab and adjoining areas for centuries when the earliest schools were attached to gurdwaras.

In Jammu Division, Takri, which developed through the Dēvāśēṣa stage of Sharada from the 14th-18th centuries developed into Dogri, which was a "highly imperfect" script later consciously influenced in part by Gurmukhi during the late 19th century, possibly to provide it an air of authority by having it resemble scripts already established in official and literary capacities, though not displacing Takri.

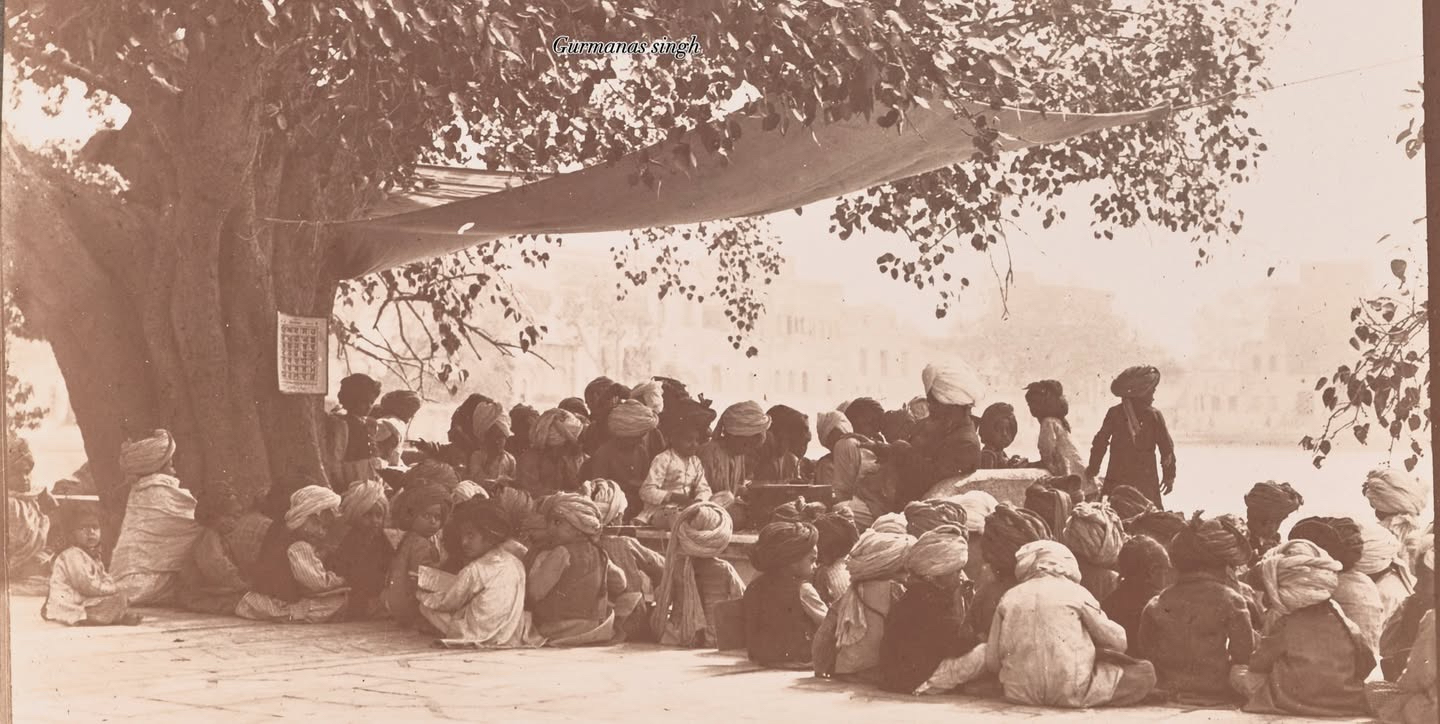
Photograph of a pathasala class held at the Golden Temple complex in Amritsar, Punjab, 1908. Pinned on the tree, there is a poster of the thirty-five glyphs of the Gurmukhi script, known in Punjabi as the painti akhri.

Further changes occurred during the first half of the 19th century involving the characters ਅ, ਹ, and ਲ.

=== Colonial period ===
Early British writers on the Punjab, such as John Malcolm, linked Gurmukhi to Punjabi and the Sikhs in their works. Between 1851–54 Punjab administration reports claimed that Gurmukhi was held as sacred by the Sikhs, but also claimed it had a declining influence and usage:

Goormookhee, though of sacred origin, and in the days of Seikh supremacy both a courtly and priestly tongue, is now rapidly falling into desuetude.

— "General Report on the Administration of the Punjab...for the Years 1851-52 and 1852-53," in Selections from the Records, p. 184

Christian missionary organisations, such as the Serampore Mission Press and especially the Ludhiana Mission Press, adopted the script in their works and were active in publishing Gurmukhi translations, grammars, and dictionaries. The first natively produced grammars of the Punjabi language were written in the 1860s in Gurmukhi. The Singh Sabha movement of the late 19th century, a movement to revitalize Sikh institutions which had declined during colonial rule after the fall of the Sikh Empire, also advocated for the usage of the Gurmukhi script for mass media, with print media publications and Punjabi-language newspapers established in the 1880s. In 1882, the Lahore Singh Sabha petitioned Charles Aitchison, Governor of Punjab, to adopt Gurmukhi as a medium of instruction in school, at least for Sikhs. However, the proposal was declined. In 1895, Gurmukhi was adopted as a school script for Punjabi at the first-grade level at an Amritsari school for the medium of instruction. The Oriental College, Lahore offered Punjabi courses in Romanisation and Gurmukhi in Vidwan, Budhiman, and Gyani.

=== Modern times ===
==== India ====
Official recognition of Gurmukhī was made a prerequisite by the Akali Dal for political partnership in the 1940s leading up to the 1947 partition, including in failed talks with the Muslim League. Later in the 1960s, after the struggle of the Punjabi Suba movement, the script was given the authority as the official state script of the Punjab, India, where it is used in all spheres of culture, arts, education, and administration, with a firmly established common and secular character, and is now the standard writing script for the Punjabi language in India. It was adopted as the official script on 18 April 1968. The Panjab Official Language Act of 1967 made Panjabi, written in Gurmukhi script, as Punjab state's official language, mandating all legislative documents to be published in Panjabi within the state.

With technological advances introduced in the 1970s, including the computer and the offset press, Gurmukhī usage would flourish in news media. It is one of the official scripts of the Indian Republic, and is currently the 14th most used script in the world. In recent years, Gurmukhi has been influenced by English punctuation, such as the usage of full-stops to mark the end of sentences rather than the traditional dandi.

==== Pakistan ====
After independence, some Pakistani Punjabi writers advocated for the usage of Gurmukhi to write the Punjabi language, such as P. D. Raphael, who believed it was more phonetically-accurate than Perso-Arabic script and that its use would maintain socio-cultural connections between Pakistani and Indian Punjabis. In response, Sardar Muhammad Khan in 1953 took an opposing view and advocated for the usage of Perso-Arabic, stating that the phonetic nature of Gurmukhi made it difficult to create a unified orthographic norm as people spell words by how they personally pronounce them, which leads to many spelling variations for words. Furthermore, Khan stated that by the nature of their larger population, the spellings of the uneducated would be dominant in such a Gurmukhi landscape. Khan argued that Gurmukhi lacked specific glyphs to represent the Persian and Arabic phonemes ع (Ain) [tˤ], ط (Ṭoe) [ʕ] and غ (Ghain) [ɣ̞]. He also stated that using Perso-Arabic for Punjabi would be complimentary for Urdu, which is also written in Perso-Arabic and the official language of Pakistan. Later in 1956, Khan argued regarding the historical precedence of writing Punjabi in Perso-Arabic and that it pre-dates the usage of it for Urdu.

== Characters ==
=== Letters ===
The Gurmukhī alphabet contains thirty-five base letters (akkhară), traditionally arranged in seven rows of five letters each. The first three letters, or mātarā vāhakă ("vowel bearer"), are distinct because they form the basis for independent vowels and are not consonants, or vianjană, like the remaining letters are, and except for the second letter aiṛā (Note: This letter is also commonly referred to as āṛā are never used on their own; see § Vowel diacritics for further details.) The pair of fricatives, or mūlă vargă ("base class"), share the row, which is followed by the next five sets of consonants, with the consonants in each row being homorganic, the rows arranged from the back (velars) to the front (labials) of the mouth, and the letters in the grid arranged by place and manner of articulation. The arrangement, or varṇămāllā, is completed with the antimă ṭollī, literally "ending group." The names of most of the consonants are based on their reduplicative phonetic values. The varṇămāllā is as follows:

Group Name (Articulation) ↓		Name		Sound [IPA]	Name		Sound [IPA]	Name		Sound [IPA]	Name		Sound [IPA]	Name		Sound [IPA]
mātarā vāhakă (Vowels)	mūlă vargă (Fricatives)	ੳ	ūṛā [uːɽaː]	–	ਅ	aiṛā [ɛːɽaː]	a [ə]	ੲ	īṛī [iːɽiː]	–	ਸ	sassā [səsːaː]	sa [s]	ਹ	hāhā [ɦaːɦaː]	ha [ɦ]
Occlusives →		Tenuis			Aspirates			Voiced Stops			Tonal			Nasals		
kavargă ṭollī (Velars)		ਕ	kakkā [kəkːaː]	ka [k]	ਖ	khakkhā [kʰəkʰːaː]	kha [kʰ]	ਗ	gaggā [gəgːaː]	ga [ɡ]	ਘ	ghaggā [kə̀gːaː]	gha [ kə̀ ]	ਙ	ṅaṅṅā [ŋəŋːaː]	ṅa [ŋ]
cavargă ṭollī (Affricates/Palatals)		ਚ	caccā [t͡ʃət͡ʃːaː]	ca [t͡ʃ]	ਛ	chacchā [t͡ʃʰət͡ʃʰːaː]	cha [t͡ʃʰ]	ਜ	jajjā [d͡ʒəd͡ʒːaː]	ja [d͡ʒ]	ਝ	jhajjā [t͡ʃə̀d͡ʒːaː]	jha [ t͡ʃə̀ ]	ਞ	ñaññā [ɲəɲːaː]	ña [ɲ]
ṭavargă ṭollī (Retroflexes)		ਟ	ṭaiṅkā [ʈɛŋkaː]	ṭa [ʈ]	ਠ	ṭhaṭṭhā [ʈʰəʈʰːaː]	ṭha [ʈʰ]	ਡ	ḍaḍḍā [ɖə'ɖːaː]	ḍa [ɖ]	ਢ	ḍhaḍḍā [ʈə̀ɖːaː]	ḍa [ ʈə̀ ]	ਣ	nāṇā [naːɳaː]	ṇa [ɳ]
tavargă ṭollī (Dentals)		ਤ	tattā [t̪ət̪ːaː]	ta [t̪]	ਥ	thatthā [t̪ʰət̪ʰːaː]	tha [t̪ʰ]	ਦ	daddā [d̪əd̪ːaː]	da [d̪]	ਧ	dhaddā [t̪ə̀d̪ːaː]	dha [ t̪ə̀ ]	ਨ	nannā [nənːaː]	na [n]
pavargă ṭollī (Labials)		ਪ	pappā [pəpːaː]	pa [p]	ਫ	phapphā [pʰəpʰːaː]	pha [pʰ]	ਬ	babbā [bəbːaː]	ba [b]	ਭ	bhabbā [pə̀bːaː]	bha [ pə̀ ]	ਮ	mammā [məmːaː]	ma [m]
Approximants and liquids
antimă ṭollī (Sonorants)		ਯ	yayyā [jəjːaː]	ya [j]	ਰ	rārā [ɾaːɾaː]	ra [ɾ]~[r]	ਲ	lallā [ləlːaː]	la [l]	ਵ	vāvā [ʋaːʋaː]	va [ʋ]~[w]	ੜ	ṛāṛā [ɽaːɽaː]	ṛa [ɽ]

The nasal letters ਙ ṅaṅṅā and ਞ ñaññā have become marginal as independent consonants in modern Gurmukhī. (Note: According to Bhardwaj, "the only commonly used words in which [ਙ and ਞ] occur are ਲੰਙਾ laṅṅā "lame," ਕੰਙਣ kaṅṅaṇă "bracelet," ਵਾਂਙੁ vāṅṅŭ "in the manner of," ਜੰਞ jaññă "wedding party" and ਅੰਞਾਣਾ aññāṇā, "ignorant" or "child."" Besides these archaic spellings, others words include the folk word ਤ੍ਰਿੰਞਣ triññaṇă "a women's gathering," and the early modern loanword ਇੰਞਣ iññaṇă "engine, train".) The sounds they represent occur most often as allophones of [n] in clusters with velars and palatals respectively.

The pronunciation of ਵ can vary allophonically between [[ʋ] ~ [β]] preceding front vowels, and [[w]] elsewhere.

The most characteristic feature of the Punjabi language is its tone system. The script has no separate symbol for tones, but they correspond to the tonal consonants that once represented voiced aspirates as well as older *h. To differentiate between consonants, the Punjabi tonal consonants of the fourth column, ਘ kà, ਝ cà, ਢ ṭà, ਧ tà, and ਭ pà, are often transliterated in the way of the voiced aspirate consonants gha, jha, ḍha, dha, and bha respectively, although Punjabi lacks these sounds. Tones in Punjabi can be either rising, neutral, or falling:

- When the tonal letter is in onset positions, as in the pronunciation of the names of the Gurmukhī letters, it produces the falling tone on the syllable nucleus, indicated by a grave accent (◌̀).
- When the tonal letter is in syllabic coda positions, the tone on the syllable nucleus is rising, indicated by an acute accent (◌́).
- When the tonal letter is in intervocalic positions, after a short vowel and before a long vowel, the following vowel has a falling tone. Between two short vowels, the tonal letter produces a rising tone on the preceding vowel.

The letters now always represent unaspirated consonants, and are unvoiced in onset positions and voiced elsewhere.

==== Supplementary letters ====
In addition to the 35 original letters, there are six supplementary consonants in official usage, referred to as the navīnă ṭollī or navīnă vargă, meaning "new group", created by placing a dot (bindī) at the foot (pairă) of the consonant to create pairĭ bindī consonants. These are not present in the Guru Granth Sahib or old texts. These are used most often for loanwords, though not exclusively, (Note: The sounds [f]~[ɸ] and [ʃ] can natively occur as allophones of [pʰ] and [t͡ʃʰ] respectively.) and their usage is not always obligatory.

Letter	ਸ਼	ਖ਼	ਗ਼	ਜ਼	ਫ਼	ਲ਼
Name [IPA]	sassē pairĭ bindī Punjabi pronunciation: [səsːeː pɛ:ɾɨ bɪn̪d̪iː]	khakkhē pairĭ bindī Punjabi pronunciation: [kʰəkʰːeː pɛ:ɾɨ bɪn̪d̪iː]	gaggē pairĭ bindī Punjabi pronunciation: [gəgːeː pɛ:ɾɨ bɪn̪d̪iː]	jajjē pairĭ bindī Punjabi pronunciation: [d͡ʒəd͡ʒːeː pɛ:ɾɨ bɪn̪d̪iː]	phapphē pairĭ bindī Punjabi pronunciation: [pʰəpʰːeː pɛ:ɾɨ bɪn̪d̪iː]	lallē pairĭ bindī Punjabi pronunciation: [ləlːeː pɛ:ɾɨ bɪn̪d̪iː]
Sound [IPA]	śa [ʃ]	xa [x]	ġa [ɣ]	za [z]	fa [f]	ḷa [ɭ]

The letter ਸ਼, already in use by the time of the earliest Punjabi grammars produced, along with ਜ਼ and ਲ਼, enabled the previously unmarked distinction of /[s]/ and the well-established phoneme /[ʃ]/, which is used even in native echo doublets e.g. rō̆ṭṭī-śō̆ṭṭī "stuff to eat"). The loansounds [f], [z], [x], and [ɣ] as distinct phonemes are less well-established, decreasing in that order and often dependent on exposure to Hindi-Urdu norms.

The character ਲ਼ (ḷa), the only character not representing a fricative consonant, was only recently officially added to the Gurmukhī alphabet. It was not a part of the traditional orthography, as the distinctive phonological difference between /lə/ and /ɭə/, while both native sounds, was not reflected in the script, and its inclusion is still not currently universal. (Note: Masica notes that ungeminated /l/ in non-initial positions tends to undergo retroflexion as a general rule regardless in Northwestern Indo-Aryan, and the distinction in writing is "commonly ignored"; according to Bhardwaj, [ɭ] is not universally phonemic, and "most of those who use it are not in favour of a having a separate letter ਲ਼ for this sound.") Previous usage of another glyph to represent this sound, [ਲ੍ਰ], has also been attested. The letters ਲ਼ ḷa, like ਙ ṅ, ਞ ñ, ਣ ṇ, and ੜ ṛ, do not occur word-initially, except in some cases, like in the letters' names.

Other characters, like the more recent [ਕ਼] /qə/, are also on rare occasion used unofficially, chiefly for transliterating old writings in Persian and Urdu, the knowledge of which is less relevant in modern times. (Note: According to Bhardwaj, "the use of [ਲ਼ and ਕ਼] (especially ਕ਼) is regarded as unnecessarily pedantic by most writers." Shackle notes [q] as "absent from the Panjabi phonemic inventory.")

==== Subscript letters ====
Three "subscript" letters, called ਦੁੱਤ ਅੱਖਰ duttă akkhară ("joint letters") or ਪੈਰੀਂ ਅੱਖਰ pairī̃ akkhară ("letters at the feet") are utilised in modern Gurmukhī: forms of ਹ ha, ਰ ra, and ਵ va.

The subscript ਰ ra and ਵ va are used to make consonant clusters and behave similarly; subjoined ਹ ha introduces tone.

Subscript letter	Name, original form	Usage
੍ਰ	pairī̃ rārā ਰ→ ੍ਰ	For example, the letter ਪ (pa) with a regular ਰ (ra) following it would yield the word ਪਰ /pəɾə̆/ ("but"), but with a subjoined ਰ would appear as ਪ੍ਰ- (/prə-/), resulting in a consonant cluster, as in the word ਪ੍ਰਬੰਧਕ (/pɾəbə́n̪d̪əkə̆/, "managerial, administrative"), as opposed to ਪਰਬੰਧਕ /pəɾᵊbə́n̪d̪əkə̆/, the Punjabi form of the word used in natural speech in less formal settings (the Punjabi reflex for Sanskrit /pɾə-/ is /pəɾ-/) . This subscript letter is commonly used in Punjabi for personal names, some native dialectal words, loanwords from other languages like English and Sanskrit, etc.
੍ਵ	pairī̃ vāvā ਵ→ ੍ਵ	Used occasionally in Gurbani (Sikh religious scriptures) but rare in modern usage, it is largely confined to creating the cluster /sʋə-/ in words borrowed from Sanskrit, the reflex of which in Punjabi is /sʊ-/, e.g. Sanskrit ਸ੍ਵਪ੍ਨ /s̪ʋɐ́p.n̪ɐ/→Punjabi ਸੁਪਨਾ /sʊpə̆na:/, "dream", cf. Hindi-Urdu /səpna:/. For example, ਸ with a subscript ਵ would produce ਸ੍ਵ (sʋə-) as in the Sanskrit word ਸ੍ਵਰਗ (/sʋəɾᵊgə/, "heaven"), but followed by a regular ਵ would yield ਸਵ- (səʋ-) as in the common word ਸਵਰਗ (/səʋəɾᵊgə̆/, "heaven"), borrowed earlier from Sanskrit but subsequently changed. The natural Punjabi reflex, ਸੁਰਗ /sʊɾᵊgə̆/, is also used in everyday speech.
੍ਹ	pairī̃ hāhā ਹ→ ੍ਹ	The most common subscript, this character does not create consonant clusters, but serves as part of Punjabi's characteristic tone system, indicating a tone. It behaves the same way in its use as the regular ਹ (ha) does in non-word-initial positions. The regular ਹ is pronounced in stressed positions (as in ਆਹੋ āhō "yes" and a few other common words), word-initially in monosyllabic words, and usually in other word-initial positions, (Note: Word-initial /h/ in unstressed positions may also often be elided and yield a falling tone; for example, in the words ਹਿਸਾਬ hisābă /hɪsaːbə̆/ ("account, estimate") and ਸਾਹਿਬ sāhibă /saːhɪbə̆/ (an honorific, "sir, lord", etc.). Unstressed short vowels may be reduced to yield h(a)sābă /həsaːbə̆/ and sāh(a)bă /saːhəbə̆/, and further h-elision in unstressed initial positions may yield near-homophones only distinguished by tone: ਸ੍ਹਾਬ sā̀bă /sàːbə̆/ and ਸਾਬ੍ਹ sā́bă /sáːbə̆/ respectively. Word-initial /h/ may also produce a tone without being elided.) but not in other positions, where it instead changes the tone of the applicable adjacent vowel. The difference in usage is that the regular ਹ is used after vowels, and the subscript version is used when there is no vowel, and is attached to consonants. For example, the regular ਹ is used after vowels as in ਮੀਂਹ (transcribed as mĩh (Punjabi pronunciation: [míː]), "rain"). The subjoined ਹ (ha) acts the same way but instead is used under consonants: ਚ (ca) followed by ੜ (ṛa) yields ਚੜ (caṛă), but not until the rising tone is introduced via a subscript ਹ (ha) does it properly spell the word ਚੜ੍ਹ (cáṛĭ, "climb"). This character's function is similar to that of the udātă character (ੑ U+0A51), which occurs in older texts and indicates a rising tone.

In addition to the three standard subscript letters, another subscript character representing the subjoined /j/, the ਯਕਸ਼ yakaśă or pairī̃ yayyā ( ੵ U+0A75), is utilized specifically in archaized sahaskritī-style writings in Sikh scripture, where it is found 268 times for word forms and inflections from older phases of Indo-Aryan, as in the examples

- ਰਖੵਾ /Punjabi pronunciation: [ɾəkʰːjaː]/ "(to be) protected"
- ਮਿਥੵੰਤ /Punjabi pronunciation: [mɪt̪ʰjən̪t̪ə]/ "deceiving"
- ਸੰਸਾਰਸੵ /Punjabi pronunciation: [sənsaːɾəsjə]/ "of the world"
- ਭਿਖੵਾ /Punjabi pronunciation: [pɪ̀kʰːjaː]/ "(act of) begging", etc.

There is also a conjunct form of the letter yayyā, ਯ→੍ਯ, a later form, which functions similarly to the yakaśă, and is used exclusively for Sanskrit borrowings, and even then rarely. In addition, miniaturized versions of the letters ਚ, ਟ, ਤ, and ਨ are also found in limited use as subscript letters in Sikh scripture.

Only the subjoined /ɾə/ and /hə/ are commonly used; usage of the subjoined /ʋə/ and conjoined forms of /jə/, already rare, is increasingly scarce in modern contexts.

=== Vowel diacritics ===
Vowel diacritics, with dotted circles representing the bearer consonant
Vowel			Transcription		IPA	Closest English equivalent
Ind.	Dep.	with /k/	Name	Usage	IPA	Closest English equivalent
ਅ	(none)	ਕ	mukḁ̆tā ਮੁਕਤਾ	a	[ə]	like a in about
ਆ	ਾ	ਕਾ	kannā ਕੰਨਾ	ā	[aː]~[äː]	like a in car
ਇ	ਿ	ਕਿ	siā̀rī ਸਿਹਾਰੀ	i	[ɪ]	like i in it
ਈ	ੀ	ਕੀ	biā̀rī ਬਿਹਾਰੀ	ī	[iː]	like i in litre
ਉ	ੁ	ਕੁ	auṅkaṛă ਔਂਕੜ	u	[ʊ]	like u in put
ਊ	ੂ	ਕੂ	dulaiṅkaṛă ਦੁਲੈਂਕੜ	ū	[uː]	like u in spruce
ਏ	ੇ	ਕੇ	lā̃/lāvā̃ ਲਾਂ/ਲਾਵਾਂ	ē	[eː]	like e in Chile
ਐ	ੈ	ਕੈ	dulāvā̃ ਦੁਲਾਵਾਂ	ai	[ɛː]~[əi]	like e in sell
ਓ	ੋ	ਕੋ	hōṛā ਹੋੜਾ	ō	[oː]	like o in more
ਔ	ੌ	ਕੌ	kanauṛā ਕਨੌੜਾ	au	[ɔː]~[əu]	like o in off

To express vowels (Punjabi: ਸੁਰ, romanized: sură), Gurmukhī, as an abugida, makes use of obligatory diacritics called Punjabi: ਲਗਾਂ, romanized: lagā̃. Gurmukhī is similar to Brahmi scripts in that all consonants are followed by an inherent schwa sound. This inherent vowel sound can be changed by using dependent vowel signs which attach to a bearing consonant. In some cases, dependent vowel signs cannot be used – at the beginning of a word or syllable for instance – and so an independent vowel character is used instead.

Independent vowels are constructed using the three vowel-bearing characters: ੳ ūṛā , ਅ aiṛā, and ੲ īṛī. With the exception of aiṛā (which in isolation represents the vowel [ə]), the bearer vowels are never used without additional vowel diacritics.

Vowels are always pronounced after the consonant they are attached to. Thus, siā̀rī is always written to the left, but pronounced after the character on the right. When constructing the independent vowel for [oː], ūṛā takes an irregular form instead of using the usual hōṛā.

==== Orthography ====
Gurmukhī orthography prefers vowel sequences over the use of semivowels ("y" or "w") intervocally and in syllable nuclei, as in the words:

- Punjabi: ਦਿਸਾਇਆ, romanized: disāiā "caused to be visible" rather than disāyā
- Punjabi: ਦਿਆਰ, romanized: diāră "cedar" rather than dyāră
- Punjabi: ਸੁਆਦ, romanized: suādă "taste" rather than swādă, permitting vowels in hiatus.

In terms of tone orthography, the short vowels [ɪ] and [ʊ], when paired with [h] to yield /ɪh/ and /ʊh/, represent [é] and [ó] with high tones respectively, e.g:

- Punjabi: ਕਿਹੜਾ, romanized: kihṛā (Punjabi pronunciation: [kéɽaː]) 'which?'
- Punjabi: ਦੁਹਰਾ, romanized: duhrā (Punjabi pronunciation: [d̪óɾaː]) "repeat, reiterate, double."

The compounding of [əɦ] with [ɪ] or [ʊ] yield [ɛ́ː] and [ɔ́ː] respectively, e.g:

- Punjabi: ਮਹਿੰਗਾ, romanized: mahingā (Punjabi pronunciation: [mɛ́ːŋgaː]) "expensive"
- Punjabi: ਵਹੁਟੀ, romanized: vahuṭṭī (Punjabi pronunciation: [wɔ́ʈːiː]) "bride."

=== Other signs ===
The diacritics for gemination and nasalization are together referred to as Punjabi: ਲਗਾਖਰ, romanized: lagākkhară ("applied letters").

==== Gemination ====
The diacritic ਅੱਧਕ áddakă ( ੱ ) indicates that the following consonant is geminated, and is placed above the consonant preceding the geminated one. Consonant length is distinctive in the Punjabi language, and the use of this diacritic can change the meaning of a word, as below:

Without áddakă	Transliteration	Meaning	With áddakă	Transliteration	Meaning
ਦਸ	dasă	ten	ਦੱਸ	dassĭ	tell (verb)
ਪਤਾ	patā	aware of/address	ਪੱਤਾ	pattā	leaf
ਬੁਝਣਾ	bújăṇā	to burn out, be extinguished	ਬੁੱਝਣਾ	bújjăṇā	to think through, figure out, solve
ਕਲਾ	kalā	art	ਕੱਲਾ	kallā	alone (colloquialism)

It has not been standardized to be written in all instances of gemination; there is a strong tendency, especially in rural dialects, to also geminate consonants following a long vowel (/a:/, /e:/, /i:/, /o:/, /u:/, /ɛ:/, /ɔː/, which triggers shortening in these vowels) in the penult of a word, e.g. ਔਖਾ aukkhā "difficult", ਕੀਤੀ kī̆ttī "did", ਪੋਤਾ pō̆ttā "grandson", ਪੰਜਾਬੀ panjā̆bbī "Punjabi", ਹਾਕ hākă "call, shout", but plural ਹਾਕਾਂ hā̆kkā̃. (Note: This does not include consonants which are not naturally geminated, i.e. ਹ ha, ਣ ṇa, ਰ ra, ਵ va, ੜ ṛa, and the navīnă ṭollī consonants.) Except in this case, where this unmarked gemination is often etymologically rooted in archaic forms, and has become phonotactically regular, the usage of the áddakă is obligatory.

It is also sometimes used to indicate second-syllable stress, e.g. ਬੱਚਾ ba'cā, "save".

==== Nasalisation ====
The diacritics ਟਿੱਪੀ ṭippī ( ੰ ) and ਬਿੰਦੀ bindī ( ਂ ) are used for producing a nasal phoneme depending on the following obstruent or a nasal vowel at the end of a word. All short vowels are nasalized using ṭippī and all long vowels are nasalized using bindī except for dulaiṅkaṛă ( ੂ ), which uses ṭippī instead.

Diacritic usage	Result	Examples (IPA)
Ṭippī on short vowel (/ə/, /ɪ/, /ʊ/), or dependent long vowel /u:/, before a non-nasal consonant	Adds nasal consonant at same place of articulation as following consonant (/ns/, /n̪t̪/, /ɳɖ/, /mb/, /ŋg/, /nt͡ʃ/ etc.)	ਹੰਸ /ɦənsə̆/ "goose" ਅੰਤ /ən̪t̪ə̆/ "end" ਗੰਢ /gə́ɳɖə̆/ "knot" ਅੰਬ /əmbə̆/ "mango" ਸਿੰਗ /sɪŋgə̆/ "horn, antler" ਕੁੰਜੀ /kʊɲd͡ʒiː/ "key" ਗੂੰਜ /guːɲd͡ʒə̆/ "rumble, echo" ਲੂੰਬੜੀ /luːmbᵊɽiː/ "fox"
Bindī over long vowel (/a:/, /e:/, /i:/, /o:/, independent /u:/, /ɛ:/, /ɔː/) before a non-nasal consonant not including /h/	Adds nasal consonant at same place of articulation as following consonant (/ns/, /n̪t̪/, /ɳɖ/, /mb/, /ŋg/, /nt͡ʃ/ etc.). May also secondarily nasalize the vowel	ਕਾਂਸੀ /kaːnsiː/ "bronze" ਕੇਂਦਰ /keːn̯d̯əɾə̆/ "center, core, headquarters" ਗੁਆਂਢੀ /gʊáːɳɖiː/ "neighbor" ਭੌਂਕ /pɔ̀ːŋkə̆/ "bark, rave" ਸਾਂਝ /sáːɲd͡ʒə̆/ "commonality"
Ṭippī over consonants with dependent long vowel /u:/ at open syllable at end of word or ending in /ɦ/	Vowel nasalization	ਤੂੰ /t̪ũː/ "you" ਸਾਨੂੰ /saːnũː/ "to us" ਮੂੰਹ /mũːɦ/ "mouth"
Ṭippī on short vowel before nasal consonant (/n̪/ or /m/)	Gemination of nasal consonant Ṭippī is used to geminate nasal consonants instead of áddakă	ਇੰਨਾ /ɪn̪:a:/ "this much" ਕੰਮ /kəm:ə̆/ "work"
Bindī over long vowel (/a:/, /e:/, /i:/, /o:/, /u:/, /ɛ:/, /ɔː/), at open syllable at end of word, or ending in /ɦ/	Vowel nasalization	ਬਾਂਹ /bã́h/ "arm" ਮੈਂ /mɛ̃ː/ "I, me" ਅਸੀਂ /əsĩː/ "we" ਤੋਂ /t̪õː/ "from" ਸਿਊਂ /sɪ.ũː/ "sew"

Older texts may follow other conventions.

==== Vowel suppression ====
The ਹਲੰਤ halantă, or ਹਲੰਦ halandă, ( ੍ U+0A4D) character is not used when writing Punjabi in Gurmukhī. However, it may occasionally be used in Sanskritised text or in dictionaries for extra phonetic information. When it is used, it represents the suppression of the inherent vowel.

The effect of this is shown below:

ਕ – kə

ਕ੍ – k

==== Punctuation ====
The ਡੰਡੀ ḍaṇḍī (।) is used in Gurmukhī to mark the end of a sentence. A doubled ḍaṇḍī, or ਦੋਡੰਡੀ doḍaṇḍī (॥) marks the end of a verse.

The visarga symbol (ਃ U+0A03) is used very occasionally in Gurmukhī. It can represent an abbreviation, as the period is used in English, though the period for abbreviation, like commas, exclamation points, and other Western punctuation, is freely used in modern Gurmukhī.

=== Numerals ===
Gurmukhī has its own set of digits, or ਅੰਗੜੇ aṅgăṛē, which function exactly as in other versions of the Hindu–Arabic numeral system. These are used extensively in older texts. In modern contexts, they are sometimes replaced by standard Western Arabic numerals.

Numeral	੦	੧	੨	੩	੪	੫	੬	੭	੮	੯
Number	0	1	2	3	4	5	6	7	8	9
Name	ਸੁੰਨ	ਇੱਕ	ਦੋ	ਤਿੰਨ	ਚਾਰ	ਪੰਜ	ਛੇ	ਸੱਤ	ਅੱਠ	ਨੌਂ
Transliteration	sunnă	ikkă	dō	tinnă*	cāră	panjă	chē	sattă	aṭṭhă	na͠u
IPA	[sʊnːə̆]	[ɪkːə̆]	[d̪oː]	[t̪ɪnːə̆]	[t͡ʃaːɾə̆]	[pənd͡ʒə̆]	[t͡ʃʰeː]	[sət̪ːə̆]	[əʈːʰə̆]	[nɔ̃:]

*In some Punjabi dialects, the word for three is ਤ੍ਰੈ trai (Punjabi pronunciation: [t̪ɾɛː]).

=== Glyphs ===
Ik Onkār, a Sikh symbol (encoded as a single character in Unicode at U+0A74, ੴ)

The scriptural symbol for the Sikh term ਇੱਕੁ ਓਅੰਕਾਰੁ ikku ōaṅkāru (ੴ U+0A74) is formed from ੧ ("1") and ਓ ("ō").

== Palaeography ==
=== Vowels ===
The length of the kannā diacritic, used to indicate the ā vowel, in historical manuscripts is often considered when roughly estimating their ages. In earlier Gurmukhī texts, the is often indicated by a "mere dot." As the orthographic tradition developed, the kannā became a longer mark that starts at the top of the line where the words are connected and moving down to cover the top half of the letter space. Shorter kannā marks are indicative of a work dating to an earlier period.

=== Spacing ===
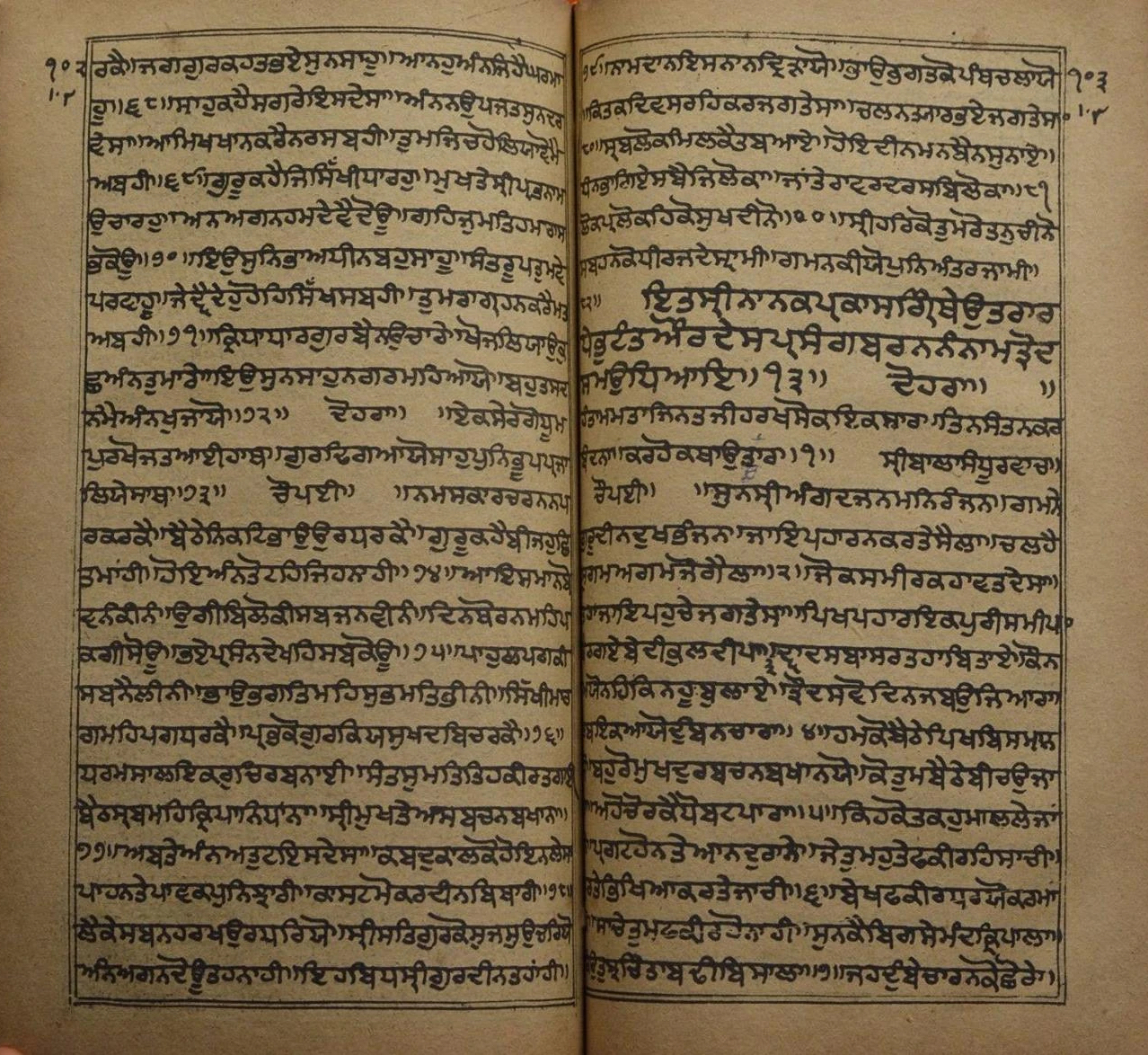
Photograph of folios written in laṛīvāră (scriptio continua) Gurmukhī script

Before the 1970s, Gurbani and other Sikh scriptures were written in the traditional scriptio continua method of writing the Gurmukhī script known as ਲੜੀਵਾਰ laṛīvāră, where there were no spacing between words in the texts. This is opposed to the comparatively more recent method of writing in Gurmukhī known as ਪਦ ਛੇਦ padă chēdă, or "verse perforation," which breaks the words by inserting spacing between them.

First line of the Guru Granth Sahib, the Mul Mantar, in laṛīvāră (continuous form) and padă chēdă (spaced form):

laṛīvāră: ੴਸਤਿਨਾਮੁਕਰਤਾਪੁਰਖੁਨਿਰਭਉਨਿਰਵੈਰੁਅਕਾਲਮੂਰਤਿਅਜੂਨੀਸੈਭੰਗੁਰਪ੍ਰਸਾਦਿ॥

padă chēdă: ੴ ਸਤਿ ਨਾਮੁ ਕਰਤਾ ਪੁਰਖੁ ਨਿਰਭਉ ਨਿਰਵੈਰੁ ਅਕਾਲ ਮੂਰਤਿ ਅਜੂਨੀ ਸੈਭੰ ਗੁਰ ਪ੍ਰਸਾਦਿ ॥

Transliteration: ikku ōaṅkāru sati nāmu karatā purakhu nirapàu niravairu akāla mūrati ajūnī saipàṅ gura prasādi

=== Styles ===
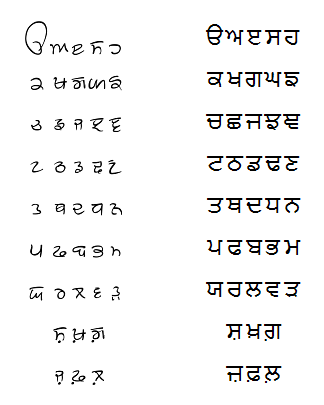
Gurmukhī can be digitally rendered in a variety of fonts. The Dukandar (shopkeeper) font, left, is meant to resemble informal Punjabi handwriting.

Various historical styles and fonts, or Punjabi: ਸ਼ੈਲੀ, romanized: śailī, of Gurmukhī script have evolved and been identified. A list of some of them is as follows:

1. purātana ("old") style
2. ardha śikastā ("half-broken") style
3. śikastā ("broken") style (including Anandpur Lipi)
4. Kaśmīrī style
5. Damdamī style

== Grapholinguistics ==
In India, various scholars and institutions have researched Gurmukhi. Some notable academics and bodies include Mohan Singh Diwana, Duni Chandra, Sant Singh Sekhon, Prem Prakash Singh, G. B. Singh, Vidya Bhaskar Arun, P. P. Singh, K. S. Bedi and the Languages Department, Patiala (which produced the Punjabi Vartik series, published in 1970, 1974, and 1975). Duni Chandra's works (1959 and 1964) covered topics like voiced aspirate symbols. The Linguistic Atlas of the Punjab (1973) covers Gurmukhi orthography.

== Unicode ==
Gurmukhī script was added to the Unicode Standard in October 1991 with the release of version 1.0.

Many sites still use proprietary fonts that convert Latin ASCII codes to Gurmukhī glyphs.

The Unicode block for Gurmukhī is U+0A00–U+0A7F:

Gurmukhi^{[1]}^{[2]} Official Unicode Consortium code chart (PDF)
	0	1	2	3	4	5	6	7	8	9	A	B	C	D	E	F
U+0A0x		ਁ	ਂ	ਃ		ਅ	ਆ	ਇ	ਈ	ਉ	ਊ					ਏ
U+0A1x	ਐ			ਓ	ਔ	ਕ	ਖ	ਗ	ਘ	ਙ	ਚ	ਛ	ਜ	ਝ	ਞ	ਟ
U+0A2x	ਠ	ਡ	ਢ	ਣ	ਤ	ਥ	ਦ	ਧ	ਨ		ਪ	ਫ	ਬ	ਭ	ਮ	ਯ
U+0A3x	ਰ		ਲ	ਲ਼		ਵ	ਸ਼		ਸ	ਹ			਼		ਾ	ਿ
U+0A4x	ੀ	ੁ	ੂ					ੇ	ੈ			ੋ	ੌ	੍		
U+0A5x		ੑ								ਖ਼	ਗ਼	ਜ਼	ੜ		ਫ਼	
U+0A6x							੦	੧	੨	੩	੪	੫	੬	੭	੮	੯
U+0A7x	ੰ	ੱ	ੲ	ੳ	ੴ	ੵ	੶									
Notes 1.As of Unicode version 18.0 2.Grey areas indicate non-assigned code points

== Digitization ==
=== Manuscripts ===
Panjab Digital Library has taken up digitization of all available manuscripts of Gurmukhī Script. The script has been in formal use since the 1500s, and a lot of literature written within this time period is still traceable. Panjab Digital Library has digitized over 45 million pages from different manuscripts and most of them are available online.

=== Internet domain names ===
Punjabi University Patiala has developed label generation rules for validating international domain names for internet in Gurmukhī.

== See also ==
- Punjabi Braille
- Shahmukhi alphabet

== Sources ==
- Jain, Danesh; Cardona, George (2007). The Indo-Aryan Languages. Routledge. ISBN 978-1-135-79711-9.
- Salomon, Richard (2007). "Writing Systems of the Indo-Aryan Languages". In Cardona, George; Jain, Dhanesh (eds.). The Indo-Aryan Languages. Routledge. pp. 68–114. ISBN 978-1-135-79711-9.
- Shackle, Christopher (2007). "Panjabi". In Cardona, George; Jain, Dhanesh (eds.). The Indo-Aryan Languages. Routledge. pp. 582–622. ISBN 978-1-135-79711-9..
- Masica, Colin (1993). The Indo-Aryan Languages. Cambridge, U.K.: Cambridge University Press. ISBN 978-0-521-29944-2.
- Bāhrī, Hardev (2011). "Gurmukhī". In Siṅgh, Harbans (ed.). Encyclopedia of Sikhism. Vol. II (E–L) (3rd ed.). Patiala: Punjabi University. pp. 181–184. ISBN 978-81-7380-100-6.
- Grierson, George A. (1916). "Pañjābī". Linguistic Survey of India. Vol. IX: Indo-Aryan family. Central group, Part 1, Specimens of Western Hindi and Pañjābī. Calcutta: Office of the Superintendent of Government Printing, India. pp. 624–629.
- Bhardwaj, Mangat Rai (2016). Panjabi: A Comprehensive Grammar. Routledge. doi:10.4324/9781315760803. ISBN 978-1-138-79385-9.
