= Anandpur, Firozabad =

Village in Uttar Pradesh, India

Anandpur
- Village
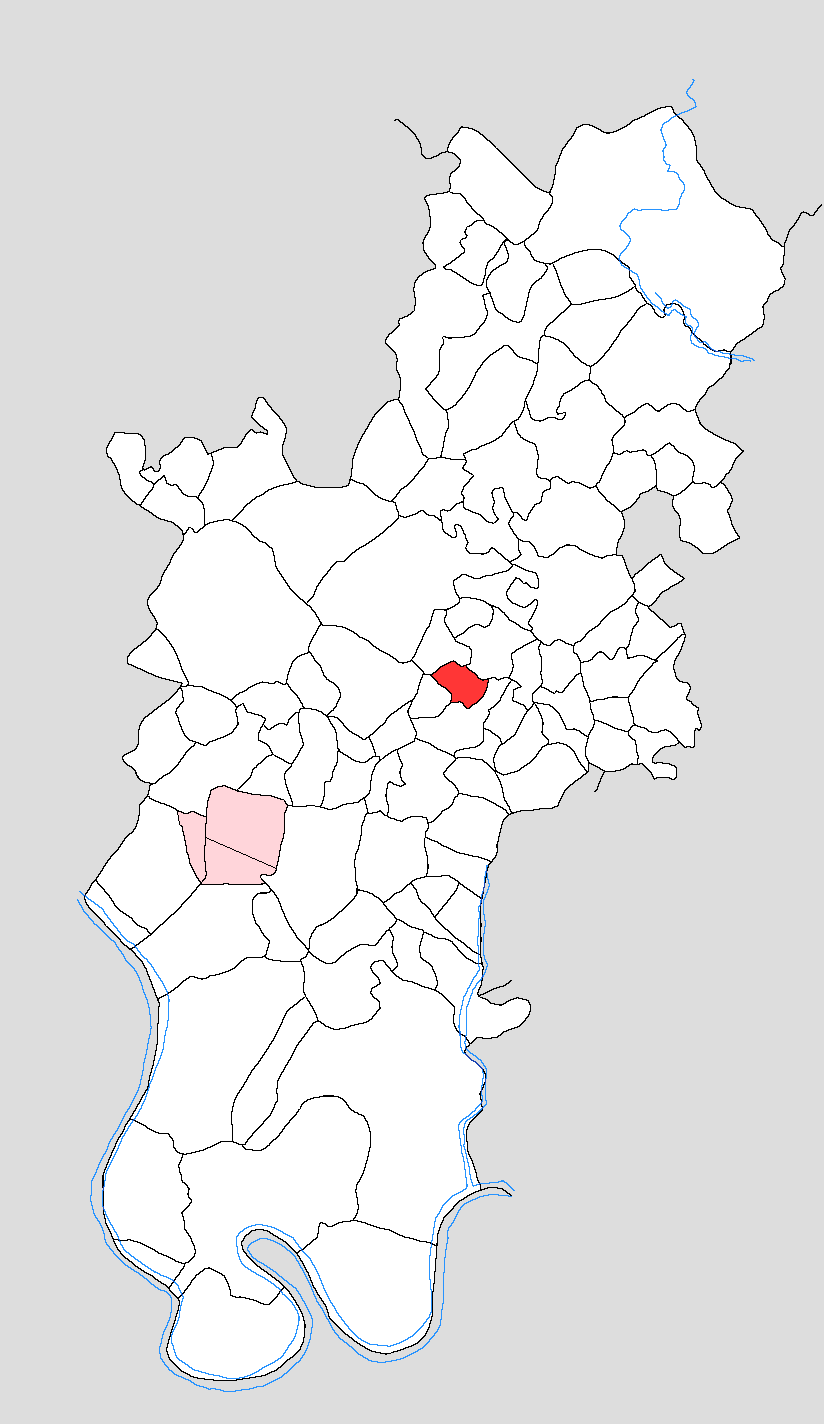
- Map showing Anandpur in Tundla block

- Location in Uttar Pradesh, India
- Coordinates: 27.2531878°N 78.2821509°E
- Country: India
- State: Uttar Pradesh
- District: Firozabad
- Tehsil: Tundla

Area
  - Total: 1.20 km^{2} (0.46 sq mi)

Population (2011)
  - Total: 682
  - Density: 568/km^{2} (1,470/sq mi)
- Time zone: UTC+5:30 (IST)

Anandpur (Ānandpur) is a village in Tundla block of Firozabad district, Uttar Pradesh. As of 2011, it has a population of 682, in 120 households.

== Demographics ==
As of 2011, Anandpur had a population of 682, in 120 households. This population was 53.2% male (363) and 46.8% female (319). The 0-6 age group numbered 121 (67 male and 54 female), making up 17.7% of the total population. 441 residents were members of Scheduled Castes, or 64.7% of the total.

The 1981 census recorded Anandpur as having a population of 479 people (283 male and 196 female), in 93 households and 87 physical houses.

The 1961 census recorded Anandpur as comprising 1 hamlet, with a total population of 348 people (186 male and 162 female), in 66 households and 37 physical houses. The area of the village was given as 299 acres.

== Infrastructure ==
As of 2011, Anandpur had 1 primary school and 1 maternity and child welfare centre. Drinking water was provided by hand pump; there were no public toilets. The village did not have a post office or public library; there was at least some access to electricity for all purposes. Streets were made of both kachcha and pakka materials.
