= Anandapur, Bankura =

Anandapur
- village
- Country: India
- State: West Bengal
- District: Bankura

Government
  - Type: Panchayati raj (India)
  - Body: Gram panchayat

Languages
  - Official: Bengali, English
- Time zone: UTC+5:30 (IST)
- ISO 3166 code: IN-WB
- Vehicle registration: WB-

Anandapur is a village in Bankura I Sub District in Bankura district, West Bengal, India.

== Demographics ==
According to 2011 census of India, the village has a population of 42; 22 are male and 20 female.
