= Battle of Anandpur (1812) =

- Part of Hill States-Sikh Wars
Date	1812
Location	Anandpur Sahib
Result	Sikh victory

Belligerents
Sikh Empire	Bilaspur State

Commanders and leaders
Ranjit Singh; Surjan Singh; Hukma Singh; Mahna Singh; Sukkha Singh	Raja Chand

Strength
5,000 under Surjan Singh; Unknown under Hukma Singh	Unknown

The Battle of Anandpur was fought in 1812 by the Sikh forces led by Sodhi Surjan Singh and the Rajput forces of Kahlur led by Raja Mahan Chand.

== Background ==
Sodhi Surjan Singh of Anandpur Sahib, detail of a miniature painting

The Sikhs had enemies in the Hill States, especially Kahlur. Anandpur was disputed between the Sikhs and Kahlur and they fought many battles starting from 1682 to determine who was the rightful owner of the city. After 1704, the Sikhs had left Anandpur and captured it during the reign of Banda Singh Bahadur. In 1812, the Kahlur Raja Mahan Chand asked Sodhi Surjan Singh to pay tax to him, claiming to own the city. When this was rejected, he attacked Anandpur.

== Battle ==
Sikh general Hukma Singh Chimni was camping near the city when he heard that there was an attack at Anandpur. He and his army marched to the city. There is a vaar called Anandpur Di Var, also referred to as Sodhian Di Var written by Ram Singh about the battle. The troops were defeated with heavy losses and were forced to retreat. The poet states that Bhai Sukkha Singh, author of the book Gurbilas Daswin Patshahi and Bhai Mahna Singh, the Jathedar of Kesgarh fought in this battle.

== Aftermath ==
Instead of receiving tax, the Hill State had to pay the Sikhs the tax. This was the last attack on Anandpur before the colonial era of Punjab.

== See also ==
- Nihang
- Martyrdom and Sikhism
