= Anandpur Bhadla =

Gujarati village

Anandpur Bhadla is a village in Chotila Taluka of Surendranagar district, Gujarat, India.

== History ==
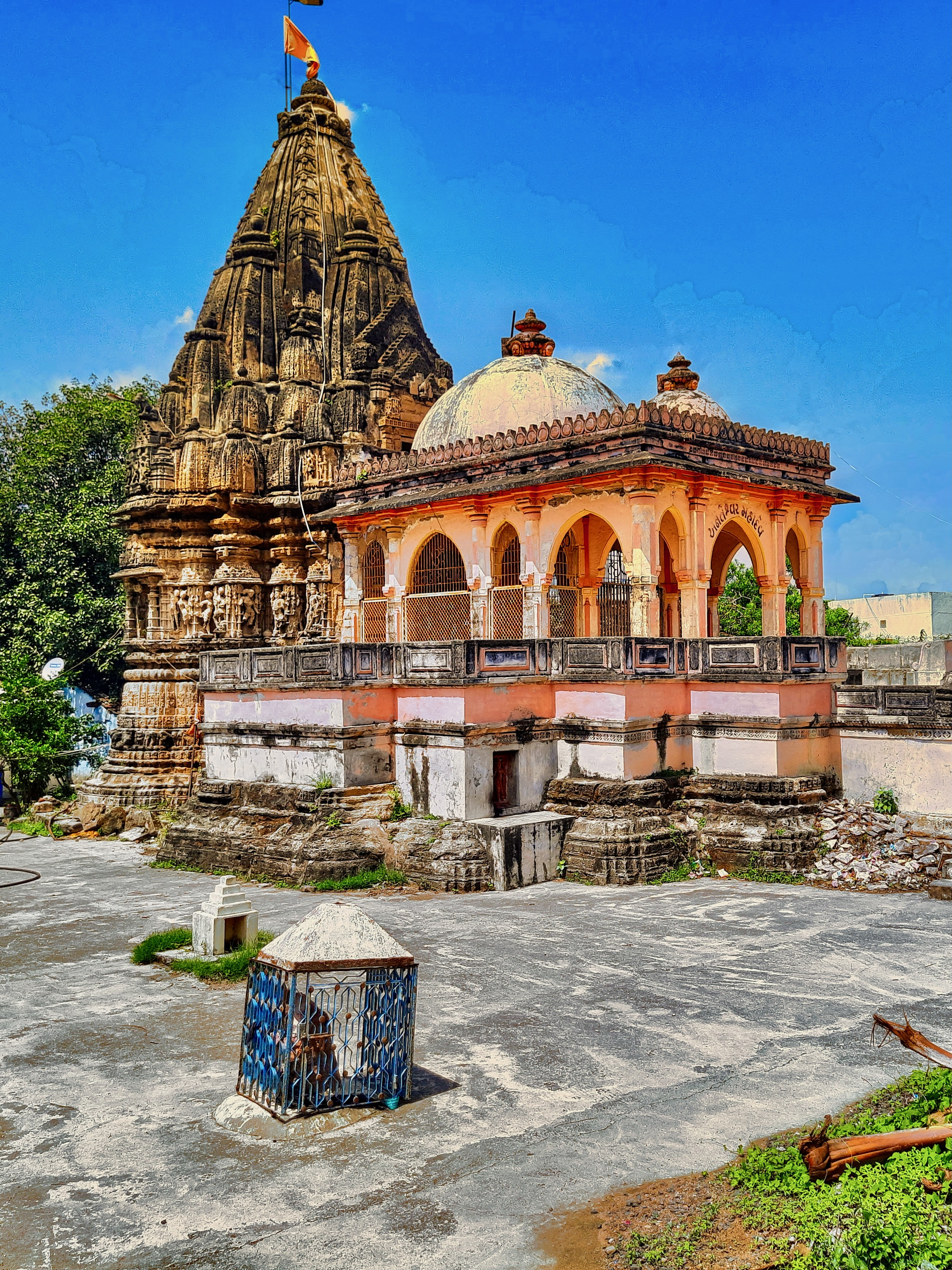
Anantheshwar (Anteshwar) Temple

In former times it was an outpost of the kings of Anhilwad Patan, and the temple there is said by some to have been built by Jayasimha Siddharaja, but the bards attribute it to Raja Anant Chudasma. It was founded according to the bards in 1068 (Samvat 1124) by Chudasama Anand or Anant who built the large temple to Mahadev there, calling it Ananteshvar now corrupted to Anteshvar. Anandpur became waste in about 1264 (S. 1320). It was repopulated by the Kathis so late as 1608. During Indian Rebellion of 1857, the temple rooms were used as hiding place. They are now known as the 'Brahmachari's Residence'. The temple was renovated by Kathis in 1857.

Anandpur is situated in the Thanga range of hills, some of which exceed a thousand feet in height. There is a fair held at the Thanganath temple in these hills on the last day of the dark half of the month of Shravan (July–August). The neighbourhood of Anandpur is famous for its excellent horses. The Anandpur Khachar Kathis are a branch of the house of Chotila who possessed it during the British period and was separate tribute paying state under Chotila thana.
