= English punctuation =

Punctuation of writing as used in the English language

Punctuation in the English language helps the reader to understand a sentence through visual means other than just the letters of the alphabet. English punctuation has two complementary aspects: phonological punctuation, linked to how the sentence can be read aloud, particularly to pausing; and grammatical punctuation, linked to the structure of the sentence. In popular discussion of language, incorrect punctuation is often seen as an indication of lack of education and of a decline of standards.

== Variants ==
=== British and American styles ===
The two broad styles of punctuation in English are often called British (typically used in the UK, Ireland, and most of the Commonwealth of Nations) and American (also common in Canada and places with a strong American influence on local English, as in the Philippines). These two styles differ mainly in the way in which they handle quotation marks with adjacent punctuation and the use or omission of the full point (period) with contraction abbreviations.

=== Open and closed punctuation ===
The terms open and closed punctuation have been applied to minimizing versus comprehensively including punctuation, respectively, aside from any dialectal trends. Closed punctuation is used in scholarly, literary, general business, and "everyday" writing. Open style dominates in text messaging and other short-form online communication, where more formal or "closed" punctuation can be misinterpreted as aloofness or even hostility.

==== Open punctuation ====
Open punctuation eliminates the need for a period at the end of a stand-alone statement, in an abbreviation or acronym (including personal initials and post-nominal letters, and time-of-day abbreviations), as well as in components of postal addresses. This style also eschews optional commas in sentences, including the serial comma. Open punctuation also frequently drops apostrophes.

Open punctuation is used primarily in certain forms of business writing, such as letterhead and envelope addressing, some business letters, and résumés and their cover letters.

==== Closed punctuation ====
In contrast, closed punctuation uses commas and periods in a strict manner.

Closed style is common in presentations, especially in bulleted and numbered lists. It is also frequently used in advertising, marketing materials, news headlines, and signage.

== Usage of different punctuation marks or symbols ==
=== Frequency ===
One analysis found the average frequencies for English punctuation marks, based on 723,000 words of assorted texts, to be as follows (as of 2013, but with some text corpora dating to 1998 and 1987):

Name	Symbol	Frequency (per 1000 words)
Full stop (period)	.	65.3
Comma	,	61.6
Double quotation mark	"	26.7
Apostrophe / single quotation mark	'	24.3
Hyphen	-	15.3
Question mark	?	5.6
Colon	:	3.4
Exclamation mark	!	3.3
Semicolon	;	3.2

=== Apostrophe ===
The apostrophe ⟨'⟩, sometimes called inverted comma in British English, is used to mark possession, as in "John's book", and to mark letters omitted in contractions, such as you're for you are.

=== Brackets ===
Brackets (⟨[ ]⟩, ⟨( )⟩, ⟨ { } ⟩, ⟨ ⟨ ⟩ ⟩) are used for parenthesis, explanation or comment: such as "John Smith (the elder, not his son)..."

=== Colon ===
The colon ⟨:⟩ is used to start an enumeration, as in Her apartment needed a few things: a toaster, a new lamp, and a nice rug. It is used between two clauses when the second clause otherwise clarifies the first, as in I can barely keep my eyes open: I hardly got a wink of sleep.

=== Comma ===
The comma ⟨,⟩ is used to disambiguate the meaning of sentences, by providing boundaries between clauses and phrases. For example, "Man, without his cell phone, is nothing" (emphasizing the importance of cell phone) and "Man: without, his cell phone is nothing" (emphasizing the importance of men) have greatly different meanings, as do "eats shoots and leaves" (to mean "consumes plant growths") and "eats, shoots and leaves" (to mean "eats firstly, fires a weapon secondly, and leaves the scene thirdly").

The comma is also used to group digits in numerals and dates: "2,000" and "January 7, 1985". A thin space is sometimes used instead for the thousands separator, especially in technical writing.

=== Dash and hyphen ===
The dash (⟨‒⟩, ⟨–⟩, ⟨—⟩) and hyphen or hyphen-minus ⟨-⟩ is used:

- as a line continuation when a word is broken across two lines;
- to apply a prefix to a word for which there is no canonical compound word;
- as a replacement for a comma, when the subsequent clause significantly shifts the primary focus of the preceding text.

=== Ellipsis ===
An ellipsis ⟨...⟩ is used to mark omitted text or when a sentence trails off.

=== Exclamation mark ===
The exclamation mark ⟨!⟩ is used to mark an exclamation.

=== Full point, full stop, or period ===
The character known as the full point or full stop in British and Commonwealth English and as the period in North American English ⟨.⟩ serves multiple purposes. As the full stop, it is used to mark the end of a sentence. It is also used, as the full point, to indicate abbreviation, including of names as initials:

Dwight D. Eisenhower's home in Gettysburg, Pa., was not very far from Washington, D.C.

The frequency and specifics of the latter use vary widely, over time and regionally. For example, these marks are usually left out of acronyms and initialisms today, and in many British publications they are omitted from contractions such as Dr for Doctor, where the abbreviation begins and ends with the same letters as the full word.

Another use of this character, as the decimal point, is found in mathematics and computing (where it is often nicknamed the "dot"), dividing whole numbers from decimal fractions, as in 2,398.45. In computing, the dot is used as a delimiter more broadly, as site and file names ("wikipedia.org", "192.168.0.1" "document.txt"), and serves special functions in various programming and scripting languages.

=== Question marks ===
The question mark ⟨?⟩ is used to mark the end of a sentence which is a question.

=== Quotation marks ===
Quotation marks (⟨‘ ’⟩, ⟨“ ”⟩, ⟨' '⟩, ⟨" "⟩) are used in pairs to set off quotation, with two levels for distinguishing nested quotations: single and double. North American publishers of English texts tend to favour double quotation marks for the primary quotation, switching to single for any quote-within-a-quote, while British and Commonwealth publishers may use either single or double for primary quotation, also switching to the alternative for any nested. Further nesting (quote-within-a-quote-within-a-quote) reverts to the primary marks, and so forth.

Question marks, exclamation marks, semicolons and colons are placed inside the quotation marks when they apply only to the quoted material; if they syntactically apply to the sentence containing or introducing the material, they are placed outside the marks. In British publications (and those throughout the Commonwealth of Nations more broadly), periods and commas are most often treated the same way, but usage varies widely. In American publications, periods and commas are usually placed inside the quotation marks regardless. The American system, also known as typographer's quotation, is also common in Canadian English, and in fiction broadly.

A third system, known as logical quotation, is strict about not including terminal punctuation within the quotation marks unless it was also found in the quoted material. Some writers conflate logical quotation and the common British style (which actually permits some variation, such as replacement of an original full stop with a comma or vice versa, to suit the needs of the quoting sentence, rather than moving the non-original punctuation outside the quotation marks). For example, The Chicago Manual of Style, 14th ed.: "The British style is strongly advocated by some American language experts. Whereas there clearly is some risk with question marks and exclamation points, there seems little likelihood that readers will be misled concerning the period or comma." It goes on to recommend "British" or logical quotation for fields such as linguistics, literary criticism, and technical writing, and also notes its use in philosophy texts.

=== Semicolon ===
The semicolon ⟨;⟩ is used to separate two independent but related clauses: My wife would like tea; I would prefer coffee. The semicolon is also used to separate list items when the list items contain commas: "She saw three men: Jamie, who came from New Zealand; John, the milkman's son; and George, a gaunt kind of man."

=== Slash ===
The slash, stroke, solidus or oblique (⟨/⟩, ⟨/ ⟩) is often used to indicate alternatives, such as "his/her", or two equivalent meanings or spellings, such as "grey/gray". The slash is used in certain set phrases, such as the conjunction "and/or".
