= Kalyanji–Anandji =

Indian music composer duo

Kalyanji-Anandji
- Kalyanji (left) - Anandji (right)

Background information
- Genre: Film score
- Occupations: Composer, music director, orchestrator, conductor
- Years active: 1954–1994
- Past members: Kalyanji Virji Shah; Anandji Virji Shah

Kalyanji–Anandji were an Indian composer duo, consisting of Kalyanji Virji Shah (30 June 1928 – 24 August 2000) and his brother Anandji Virji Shah (born 2 March 1933). In a career spanning over forty years, they composed music for about 250 films, working with many well-known filmmakers and singers.

== Personal lives ==
Kalyanji and Anandji were children of a Kutchi Jain businessman who migrated from Kundrodi village in Kutch to 'Bombay' (now Mumbai) to start a grocery and provision store. Their younger brother and his wife are the husband and wife duo Babla & Kanchan. The brothers began to learn music from a music teacher, who taught them in lieu of paying his bills to their father. One of their great-grandparents was a folk musician of some eminence. They spent most of their formative years in the Mumbai locality of Girgaum amidst Marathi and Gujarati environs and among some eminent musical talent that resided in the vicinity.

Kalyanji started his career as a musician, with a new electronic instrument called the clavioline. which was used for the famous "Nagin Been," used in the film Nagin (1954) which had the music of Hemant Kumar. Kalyanji then, with his brother Anandji, started an orchestral group called Kalyanji Virji and Party which organised musical shows in Mumbai and outside. This was the first attempt made for holding live musical shows in India.

Kalyanji Anandji's arrival in the Bombay film industry as music composers was a turning point. When music directors like S. D. Burman, Hemant Kumar, Madan Mohan, Naushad, Shankar–Jaikishan and O. P. Nayyar were renowned in the Hindi film music world and it was a golden period of film music, it was tough to make a place amongst them. They still managed to attain success amongst the competition.

== Career ==
=== 1954–1969: Early struggles and breakthrough ===
Kalyanji-Anandji began their career in the 1950s with films, such as Maha Puja (1954), Bajrangbali (1956), Satta Bazaar (1959), but all of them went unnoticed. They gained recognition in the year 1960 with Raj Kapoor starrer Chhalia and Dharmendra's debut film Dil Bhi Tera Hum Bhi Tere. While the former did well commercially, Dil Bhi Tera Hum Bhi Tere was not a success, but songs from both the films like "Dum Dum Diga Diga" and "Mujhko Is Raat Ki Tanhai Mein" proved to be hits. In the early-1960s, they continued to deliver music for moderately successful films like Bluff Master (1963), Phool Bane Angaare (1963), Dulha Dulhan (1964) and finally established themselves in 1965 with a number of successful films, out of which, Jab Jab Phool Khile and Himalay Ki God Mein were major blockbusters and had many chartbusters like "Affoo Khudaya", "Ek Tha Gul Aur Ek Thi Bulbul" and "Ye Samaa Samaa Hai Pyar Ka" (Jab Jab Phool Khile), "Chand Si Mehbooba Ho Meri" and "Main To Ek Khwab Hoon" (Himalay Ki God Mein). The music of Jab Jab Phool Khile also proved to be the fourth best-selling album of the 1960s.

Their successes count continued to increase in the late 1960s with films, such as Upkar (1967), Saraswatichandra (1968), Haseena Maan Jayegi (1968) and Bandhan (1969). All of them proved to be huge box office hits, especially Upkar which was an All Time Blockbuster with its soundtrack album being the sixth best-selling album of the decade and songs that remain popular till date like "Mere Desh Ki Dharti", "Kasme Waade Pyar Wafa" and "Aayi Jhoomke Basant". For Govind Saraiya's Saraswatichandra, Kalyanji-Anandji won National Film Award for Best Music Direction. It's songs, "Main To Bhool Chali Babul Ka Des", a solo by Lata Mangeshkar and "Phool Tumhe Bheja Hai Khat Mein", a duet by Mangeshkar and Mukesh received acclaim from critics as well as the audience.

=== 1970–1979: Career peak ===
The year 1970 proved to be a milestone in Kalyanji-Anandji's career as they composed for eight major hits, which were - Johny Mera Naam, Gopi, Safar, Purab Aur Pachhim, Ghar Ghar Ki Kahani, Geet, Sachaa Jhutha and Kab? Kyoon? Aur Kahan?. The memorable songs from these films, include "O Mere Raja, "Pal Bhar Ke Liye", "Ramchandra Keh Gaye", "Sukh Ke Sab Saathi", "Nadiya Chale Chale Re", "Zindagi Ka Safar", "Bharat Ka Rehnewala Hoon", "Om Jai Jagdish Hare", "Jai Nandlala, Jai Jai Gopala" and "Sama Hai Suhana Suhana", "Jo Dil Mein Basai Thi", "Mere Mitwa Mere Meet Re", "Meri Pyari Bahaniya, Yun Hi Tum Mujhse Baat Karti Ho, Ya Koi Pyar Ka Iraada Hai", "Dil To Dil Hai Kisi Din Machal Jaayega" and "Yeh Aankhen Jhuki Jhuki Si, Yeh Saansen Ruki Ruki Si". The albums of Johny Mera Naam, Sachaa Jhutha and Safar were the third, eighteenth and twenty-third best-selling Hindi albums of the 1970s, respectively.

The flow of hits continued in 1971 and 1972 with Maryada (1971), Apradh (1972) and Victoria No. 203 (1972), all of which had notable songs, such as "Chupke Se Dil De De" and "Zuban Pe Dard Bhari Dastaan Chali Aayi" (Maryada), "Tu Na Mili To Hum Jogi Ban Jayenge" and "Do Bechaare Bina Sahaare" (Victoria No. 203), "Hamaare Siwa Tumhaare Aur Kitne Deewane Hain", "Ae Naujawan, Hai Sab Kuch Yahan" (Apradh). In 1973, they worked with Prakash Mehra for Zanjeer, a blockbuster which made Amitabh Bachchan a star. Its song "Yaari Hai Imaan Mera", a solo by Manna Dey was a runaway hit and took top spot at the Binaca Geetmala annual list that year. Apart from Zanjeer, their notable works that year were in Samjhauta, Kahani Kismat Ki, Heera and Black Mail, which had evergreen songs "Samjhauta Gamon Se Karlo", "Rafta Rafta Dekho", "Chaley Chaley Re Pawan" and "Pal Pal Dil Ke Paas", respectively.

With this, Kalyanji-Anandji established themselves as one of the three leading music directors of the era alongside Laxmikant–Pyarelal and R. D. Burman.

They continued their winning streak in the mid-1970s with films like Kora Kagaz (1974), 5 Rifles (1974), Haath Ki Safai (1974), Dharmatma (1975), Chori Mera Kaam (1975), Do Anjaane (1976), Bairaag (1976), Hera Pheri (1976), Kalicharan (1976) and Adalat (1976). All these films proved to be huge commercial successes. Memorable songs from these films, include "Mera Jeevan Kora Kagaz" (Kora Kagaz), "Jhoom Barabar Jhoom Sharaabi" (5 Rifles), "Wada Kar Le Sajna" (Haath Ki Safai), "Kya Khoob Lagti Ho" (Dharmatma), "Are Kahe Ko, Kahe Ko" (Chori Mera Kaam), "Luk Chhip Luk Chhip Jao Na" (Do Anjaane), "Saare Shaher Mein Aap Sa Koi Nahin" (Bairaag), "Waqt Ki Hera Pheri Hai" (Hera Pheri), "Ja Re Ja O Harjaee" (Kalicharan) and "Tumse Door Rehke Hum Ne Jana Pyar Kya Hai" (Adalat). For their work in Anil Ganguly's Kora Kagaz, they received their first and only Filmfare Award for Best Music Director. Kalyanji-Anandji ended the decade on a high by delivering highly popular numbers in major box office successes, such as "Bani Rahe Jodi Raja Rani Ki Jodi Re" and "Main Teri Ho Gayee Tu Mera Ho Gaya" (Khoon Pasina), "Mere Noor Ke Charche Dur Dur" and "Zindagi Naam Hai, Waqt Ki Maar Ka" (Hatyara), "O Saathi Re", "Dil To Hai Dil" and "Salaam-E-Ishq Meri Jaan Zara Qubool Kar Lo" (Muqaddar Ka Sikandar), "Jiska Mujhe Tha Intezaar, Jiske Liye Dil Tha Bekaraar", "Khaike Paan Banaraswala" and "Yeh Mera Dil" (Don), "Aankh Ladi Humse" and "Dekho Sapne" (Ganga Ki Saugandh), "Ek Baat Kahoon Main Sajna" and Aaj Faisla Ho Jayega, Tum Nahin Ya Hum Nahin" (Karmayogi), "Main Hoon Kaun, Yeh Tujhko Nahin Hai Pata" and "Thoda Thoda Sach" (Ahinsa). The soundtrack albums of "Muqaddar Ka Sikandar" and "Don" emerged as the 6th and 13th highest-selling of the decade, respectively. For Don, Kalyanji-Anandji received a nomination in the Filmfare Award for Best Music Director category.

=== 1980–1994: Continued success, setback, resurgence and final works ===
Kalyanji-Anandji began the 1980s with huge blockbusters like Vinod Khanna starrer Qurbani (1980) and Amitabh Bachchan starrer Lawaaris (1981), both of which had notable songs like "Laila O Laila", "Hum Tumhain Chahte Hain" in the former and "Apni To Jaise Taise", "Mere Angne Mein" in the latter. The soundtrack of Qurbani proved to be the sixth best-selling Hindi film album of the 1980s with Kalyanji-Anandji receiving another nomination in Filmfare Award for Best Music Director category. In 1982, they delivered music in Subhash Ghai's top-grosser Vidhaata. Its songs "Hathon Ki Chand Lakeeron Ka" and "Udi Baba Udi Baba Udi Baba" were equally successful among the masses.

== Kalyanji's death ==
On 24 August 2000, Kalyanji passed away at the age of 72 in Mumbai. He was admitted at the Breach Candy Hospital following a prolonged illness, specifically suffering from acute asthma.

== Awards ==
Wins

- Padma Shri – 1992.
- National Film Award for Best Music Direction – 1968 – Saraswatichandra
- Bengal Film Journalists' Association – Best Music Director Award (Hindi) – 1970 – Saraswatichandra
- Filmfare Award for Best Music Direction – 1975 – Kora Kagaz
- Bengal Film Journalists' Association – Best Music Director Award (Hindi) – 1975 – Kora Kagaz
- IIFA Award (South Africa) – 2003 – Lifetime Achievement Award
- Sahara Parivar Award (United Kingdom) – 2004 – Lifetime Achievement Award
- BMI Award (United States) – 2006 – For Grammy Award-winning rap song "Don't Phunk with My Heart"
- GIMA (Great Indian Music Awards) – 2015 – Lifetime Achievement Award

Nominations

- Filmfare Award for Best Music Direction – 1966 – Himalay Ki God Mein
- Filmfare Award for Best Music Direction – 1968 – Upkar
- Filmfare Award for Best Music Direction – 1974 – Zanjeer
- Filmfare Award for Best Music Direction – 1977 – Bairaag
- Filmfare Award for Best Music Direction – 1979 – Don
- Filmfare Award for Best Music Direction – 1981 – Qurbani
- Filmfare Award for Best Music Direction – 1990 – Tridev
