= Kalyanji Virji Shah =

- Born: 30 June 1928; Kundrodi, Cutch State, British India
- Died: 24 August 2000 (aged 72) Mumbai, Maharashtra, India
- Genres: Film score
- Occupations: music director, orchestrator, conductor
- Years active: 1954–2000
- Labels: His Master's Voice; Saregama; Universal Music
- Formerly of: Kalyanji-Anandji

Kalyanji Virji Shah (30 June 1928 – 24 August 2000) was the Kalyanji of the Kalyanji-Anandji duo. He and his brother Anandji Virji Shah have been famous Indian film musicians, and won the 1975 Filmfare Award for Best Music Director, for Kora Kagaz. He is a recipient of the civilian honour of Padma Shri (1992), India's fourth-highest civilian honour.

== Birth and early life ==
Kalyanji was born to Virji Shah, a Kutchi businessman in Kundrodi, Kutch, Gujarat, who migrated from Kutch to Mumbai to start a Kirana (provision store). His younger brother and his wife are the husband and wife duo Babla & Kanchan.

He and his brothers began to learn music from a music teacher, who actually knew no music but taught them in lieu of paying his bills to their father. One of their four grand parents was a folk musician of some eminence. They spent most of their formative years in the hamlet of Girgaum (a district in Mumbai) amidst Marathi and Gujarati environs — some eminent musical talent resided in the vicinity.

Kalyanji's breakthrough was with the theme entitled Been music from the film Nagin (1954).

== Career ==
=== Solo Filmography ===
- Samrat Chandragupt (1958)
- Post Box No.999 (1958)
- Bedard Zamana Kya Jaane (1959)
- Oh Tera Kya Kehna (1959)

== Family ==
Kalyanji's son, Viju Shah, is also a music director based in India.
