= Purab Aur Pachhim =

- Poster
- Directed by: Manoj Kumar
- Written by: Shashi Goswami; Manoj Kumar
- Produced by: Manoj Kumar
- Starring: Ashok Kumar; Saira Banu; Manoj Kumar; Pran; Nirupa Roy; Prem Chopra; Vinod Khanna
- Cinematography: V.N. Reddy
- Edited by: B.S. Glaad
- Music by: Kalyanji-Anandji
- Production company: Vishal International Productions
- Release date: 1970
- Running time: 168 minutes
- Country: India
- Language: Hindi

Purab Aur Pachhim (transl. East and West) is a 1970 Indian Hindi-language drama film. The film was produced and directed by Manoj Kumar, and it stars Manoj Kumar, Saira Banu, Ashok Kumar, Pran and Prem Chopra in the lead roles. The music is by Kalyanji Anandji.

== Synopsis ==
In the wake of the Quit India Movement in 1942, Harnam (Pran) betrays a freedom fighter and as a result is rewarded, but the freedom fighter is killed, leaving his wife, Ganga (Kamini Kaushal) and her family devastated and destitute. Years later, after India won its independence, the freedom fighter's son, Bharat (meaning "India") (Manoj Kumar), grows up and goes to London for higher studies. On his arrival in Britain, Bharat meets his father's college friend, Sharma (Madan Puri) with his wife Rita (Shammi), daughter Preeti (Saira Banu) and hippie son Shankar (Rajendra Nath). Preeti, having fully become Westernised, has long blonde hair, wears mini-dresses (though in many scenes, they appear to resemble kimonos), smokes, drinks and has no idea of Indian values until she meets Bharat, who becomes shocked to see that many Indians in London are ashamed of their roots and even changed their names to sound Western. However, Bharat also realises that others do long for India but stay in Britain for financial reasons, like Sharma with his stack of K. L. Saigal records. He takes it upon himself to try and change their way of thinking, while he and Preeti fall in love with each other. Later on, with his mother's and Guruji (Ashok Kumar)'s approval, he promises to marry Preeti. Impressed by Bharat's idealism, Preeti agrees to marry him, but is not willing to come to India just yet. When Bharat persuades her, she eventually adopts the traditional lifestyle.

== Cast ==
- Manoj Kumar as Bharat
- Saira Banu as Preeti Sharma
- Ashok Kumar as Guruji
- Kamini Kaushal as Ganga, Bharat's mother
- Pran as Harnam
- Prem Chopra as "O.P." Omkar
- Nirupa Roy as Kaushalya, Harnam's wife
- Vinod Khanna as Shyamu
- Bharathi as Gopi
- Madan Puri as G.P. Sharma
- Shammi as Rita Sharma, Sharma's wife
- Rajendra Nath as Shankar Sharma, Preeti's brother
- Om Prakash as Baba
- Asit Sen as Lalchand
- Manmohan as Manmohan

== Release ==
=== Box office ===
In India, the film grossed ₹45 million (US$5.95 million). This made it the fourth highest-grossing film of 1970 at the Indian box office.

Overseas in the United Kingdom, the film was released in 1971 and ran for over 50 weeks in London. It grossed £285,000 in the UK, equivalent to ₹2.5 million (US$332,252.41). It broke the UK box office record of Do Raaste, which had released in the UK a year earlier in 1970. Purab Aur Paschim held the UK record for 23 years up until Hum Aapke Hain Kaun (1994).

In total, the film grossed an estimated ₹47.5 million (US$6.31 million) in India and the United Kingdom.

=== Reception ===
Purab aur Pachhim received generally positive reviews. Deepa Gahlot of Bollywood Hungama wrote: "By linking the story to the freedom struggle, Manoj Kumar was saying that freeing India from British rule is not enough if Indians do not feel proud of their Indianness. Manoj Kumar shot in London at the height of the "hippie" phase and caught both the beauty and ugliness of the English landscape. However, his simplistic view of the West was greed, lust and depravity, while India stood for love, honour and piety. However, the idea has endured, and in even in Aditya Chopra's cult hit Dilwale Dulhania Le Jayenge, Indian boy (Shah Rukh Khan) does not touch the Indian girl (Kajol), though he claims a chain of foreign girlfriends, and neither does he want to marry her without her father's consent. Then as now, Indian culture is represented with a lot of colour, rituals, song and dance. In Namastey London (2007), Akshay Kumar sells the same version of India to the London girl (Katrina Kaif) -- and a line in the film pays tribute to the original, when he tells her that if her boyfriend's uncle and their associates want to learn more about India, he'd give her a DVD of Purab Aur Pachhim which she should give to them."

== Soundtrack ==
The music of the film was composed by Kalyanji–Anandji and lyrics by Indivar, Prem Dhawan and Santosh Anand.

Song	Singer(s)	Notes	Lyricist(s)
"Dulhan Chali"	Mahendra Kapoor		Indeevar
"Koi Jab Tumhara Hriday Tod De"	Mukesh		Indeevar
"Om Jai Jagdish Hare"	Mahendra Kapoor, Brij Bushan, Shyama Chittar	Aarti	Shardha Ram Phillauri
"Purva Suhani Aayi Re"	Lata Mangeshkar, Mahendra Kapoor, Manhar Udhas		Santosh Anand
"Raghupati Raghav Raja Ram"	Mahendra Kapoor, Manhar Udhas		Traditional (Tulsidas)
"Twinkle Twinkle Little Star"	Asha Bhosle, Mahendra Kapoor	Picturised on Saira Banu and Manoj Kumar in a giant puppet show.	Prem Dhawan
"Bharat Ka Rehnewaala"	Mahendra Kapoor	In party where India is insulted and Madan Puri asks Manoj Kumar to sing something about India	Indeevar
