= Anandji Virji Shah =

Indian music director (born 1933)

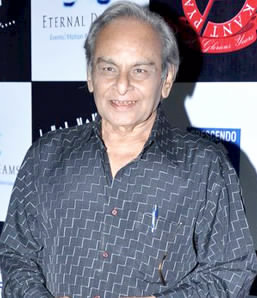

Background information
- Born: 2 March 1933 (age 92); Kundrodi, Cutch State, British India
- Genres: Film score
- Occupation(s): music director, orchestrator, conductor
- Years active: 1954–present
- Labels: His Master's Voice; Saregama; Universal Music
- Formerly of: Kalyanji-Anandji

Anandji Virji Shah (born 2 March 1933) is an Indian music director. Together with his brother he formed the Kalyanji-Anandji duo, and won the 1975 Filmfare Award for Best Music Director, for Kora Kagaz. In 1992, Anandji Shah received the Padma Shri, India's fourth-highest civilian honour.

== Life ==
Anandji was born to Virji Shah on 2 March 1933. Their father was a Kutchi businessman who had migrated from Kutch to Bombay to start a kirana (provision store). His younger brother and sister-in-law are the husband-and-wife duo Babla & Kanchan. The two brothers began to learn music from a music teacher. One of their four grandparents was a folk musician of some eminence. They spent most of their formative years in the hamlet of Girgaum (a district in Bombay) in the Marathi and Gujarati areas.
