= Kutchi people =

People native to Kutch in Gujarat, India

Kutchi people કચ્છી ڪڇي कच्छी
Total population
- c. 1 million

Regions with significant populations
- India, Pakistan

Languages
- Kutchi; Additionally: Gujarati, Jangbari, Hindi-Urdu, or Sindhi

Religion
- Majority: Hinduism, Minority: Jainism, Islam

Related ethnic groups
- Sindhis, Gujaratis, other Indo-Aryan peoples

The Kutchi people (Kutchi and Gujarati: કચ્છી (Gujarati script); Sindhi: ڪڇي (Perso-Arabic); कच्छी (Devanagari), IPA: [kətːʃʰiː]) traditionally hail from the Kutch district of the western Indian state of Gujarat and the Sindh province of Pakistan.

== History ==
The Kutchi Memons are a Kutchi people who converted from Hinduism to Islam in the 15th century A.D., due to the influence of Sunni Pirs, such as Saiyid Abdullah. Kutchis, being a part of the Indian diaspora, have maintained their traditions abroad; in 1928, Kutchi Hindus in Nairobi held a Swaminarayan procession which 1200 people attended. The Kutchis have been living in southern part of Sindh for decades and call themselves Sindhis.

Many Kutchi people are also part of the Khoja community, an international diaspora of individuals from Gujarat and its surrounding areas. From the 14th century onwards, they were influenced by the Isma'ili Nizari Pirs such as Pir Sadrudin and converted from Hinduism to Isma'ilism. In the 19th and 20th century, many of them immigrated to East Africa in search of economic opportunities, in addition to North America, the United Kingdom, and Oman.

== Notable Kutchi people ==
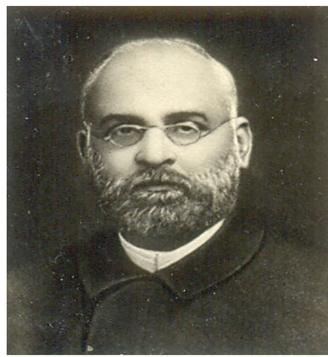
Shyamji Krishna Varma

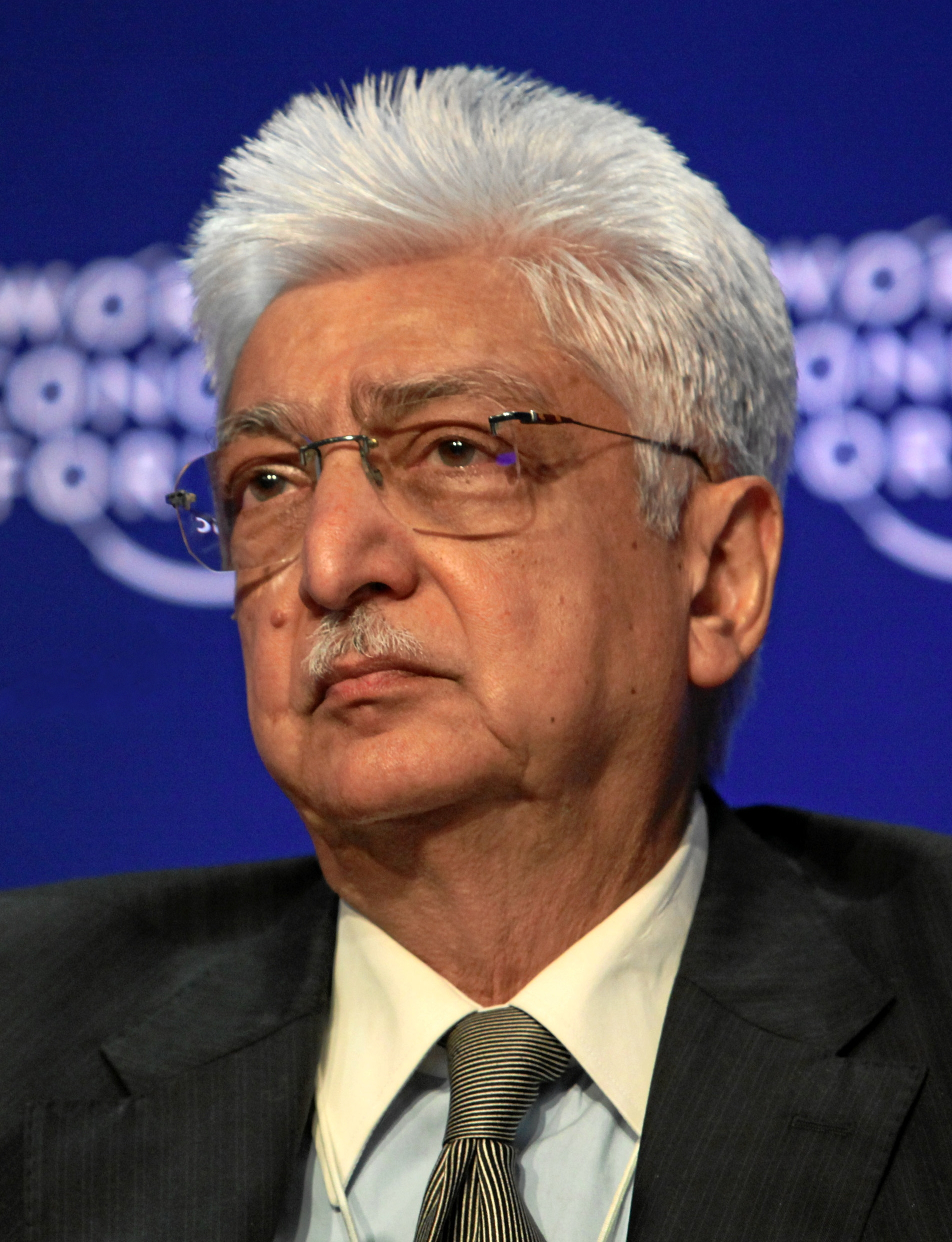
Azim Premji

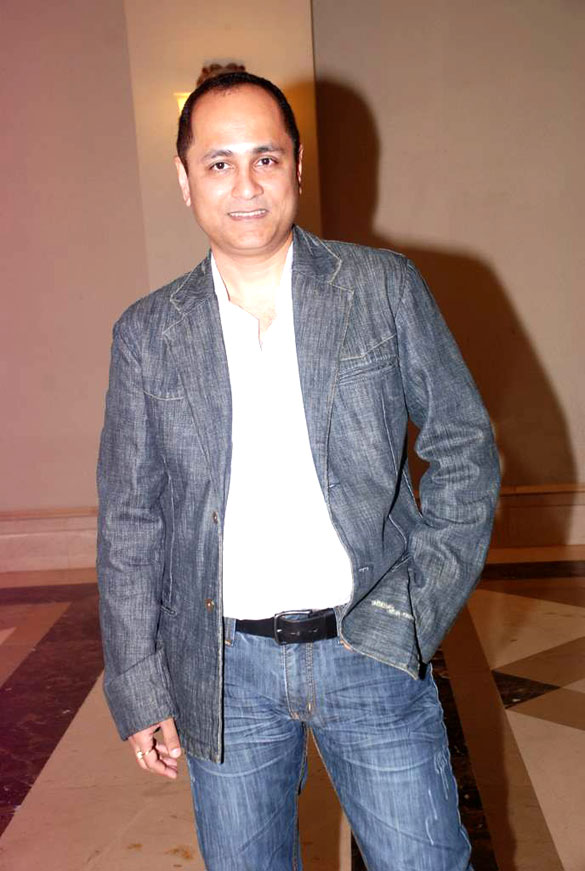
Vipul Shah

- Shyamji Krishna Varma, revolutionary, lawyer, and journalist
- Sunit Khatau, an Indian industrialist and the former chairman of the Khatau Group.
- Abdullah Hussain Haroon, Former Permanent Representative of Pakistan to the United Nations
- Abdul Qadir Patel, Pakistani Politician and Pakistan Peoples Party Parliamentarians Member National Assembly of Pakistan from NA-248 (Karachi West-I).
- Seth Khora Ramji - coal mine pioneer
- Rai Bahadur Jagmal Raja - industrialist
- Rai Bahadur Jairam Valjee - industrialist
- Azim Premji, industrialist
- El-Farouk Khaki
- Fahmida Mirza, first female Speaker of the National Assembly of Pakistan
- Faisal Devji
- Gulgee, Pakistani artist
- Hussain Shah, Pakistani boxer
- Harish Bhimani, Indian voiceover artist
- Ian Iqbal Rashid
- Irfan Razack - Indian Real Estate Businessman
- Janvi Chheda, Actress, director, and model
- John Nuraney, Canadian politician
- Anandji Virji Shah, Bollywood music director
- Kalyanji Virji Shah, Bollywood music director
- Rai Saheb Mulji Jagmal -miner
- J. D. C. Bytco - industrialist & philanthropist
- Rajesh Chauhan - bowler, cricketer
- Laxmichand "Babla" Virji Shah, musician and percussionist
- Naheed Nenshi, 36th mayor of Calgary
- Omar Sachedina, CTV Broadcaster
- Salim Merchant
- Shafique Virani
- Shekhar Ravjiani from the music duo Vishal–Shekhar
- Sulaiman Merchant
- Viju Shah, music director
- Vipul Amrutlal Shah, Bollywood director producer
- Chandra Hirjee, World Amateur Snooker Championship winner 1958, Indian Open Billiards Championship winner 1947, 56 and 58.
- Dhairya Dand Indian American inventor and artist
- Mamai Dev is regarded as the first and earliest writer of Kutchi literature.

== See also ==
- Kutch State
- Cutch State
- Cutch Agency
