= Ananta Chaturdashi =

Hindu observance

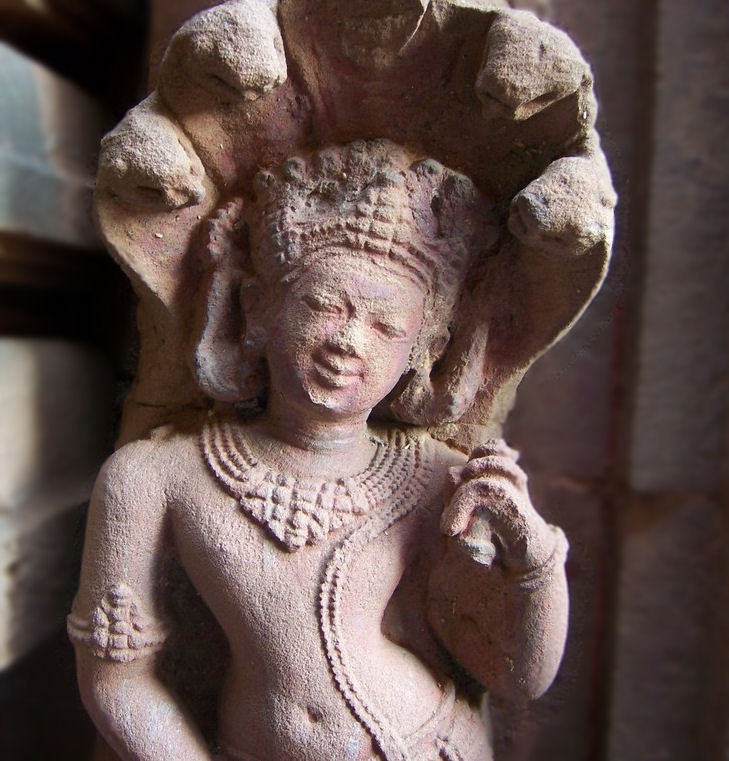
- Sculpture of Vishnu sheltered by Ananta at Parsurameswara Temple, Bhubaneswar
- Observed by: Hindus.
- Type: Religious, Indian subcontinent
- Significance: Honours Lord Vishnu’s Ananta Rup (limitless form)
- Observances: Immersion of Ganesha idols, Wearing sacred thread (yajnopavita), Prayers, Religious rituals (see puja, prasada)
- Date: 25 September 2026; Bhadrapada Shukla Chaturdashi
- Frequency: annual

Ananta Chaturdashi (Sanskrit: अनंतचतुर्दशी, romanized: Anantacaturdaśī) is a festival dedicated to Vishnu, observed and celebrated by Hindus. It is marked on the fourteenth day of the moon's waxing phase during the Hindu month of Bhadrapada. According to the Agni Purana, the Ananta (Shesha; the divine serpent) manifestation of Vishnu is venerated on this occasion to free adherents from sins.

Ananta Chaturdashi is also marked as the last day of the ten-day-long Ganesh Chaturthi festival and is also called Ganesh Chaudas, when devotees bid adieu to the deity Ganesha by immersing (visarjana) his idols in water.

== Legend ==
A legend behind the Ananta Chaturdashi is found in the Mahabharata. It recounts the story of a woman named Sushila, who encountered a group of women worshipping Ananta near a riverbank. They explained that the performance of this vrata (pious observance) would earn great merit for the performer and offer them safety. The form of Ananta was made out of darbha (sacred grass) and placed in a basket, whereby it was offered worship with scented flowers, oil lamp, incense sticks, and food they had prepared. Sushila joined the women in undertaking the ritual, whereupon a 14 knotted-sacramental thread was tied to her wrist. She then returned to join her husband, a sage called Kaundinya.

The couple reached a town called Amaravati, whose residents welcomed them for their piety and offered them a spacious house. Kaundinya began to prosper and became very rich. One day, Kaundinya noticed the thread on Sushila's wrist. When he heard from her that the reason behind his wealth was her observance of the vrata, he was displeased and maintained that their wealth was not because of Ananta, but because of his own efforts. Saying hence, Kaundinya took the thread from Sushila's hand and threw it into the fire, despite her pleas.

Following this, misfortune fell upon them: they were reduced to extreme poverty, their neighbours turned away from them, and their house caught fire. The repentant Kaundinya understood that it was punishment for having dishonoured Ananta. He roamed from place to place, asking a number of creatures and lakes if they could tell him where he could find the deity, coming across a number of unusual sights. Finally, Ananta assumed the guise of an old Brahmin man and appeared before him, following which Kaundinya pleaded for forgiveness. After explaining the significance of the unusual sights Kaundinya had observed during his wanderings, Ananta forgave Kaundinya. He asked him to observe the Ananta Chaturdashi vow for fourteen years, promising him prosperity and an eternal abode in the stars after his demise. Thus, Kaundinya and Sushila observed the vow and led a happy life thereafter.

== Jain religious observance ==
This is an important day in the Jain calendar of festivities. Jains observe the Parv Paryushana in the last 10 days of the bhado month- Digambar Jains observe ten days of the Dus Lakshan Parv and Chaturdashi (also known as Ananta Chaudas) is the last day of Daslakshan Parv. Kshamavani, the day the Jains ask for forgiveness for mistakes they have made intentionally or otherwise, is observed one day after Ananta Chaturdashi. This is the day when Vasupujya, the 12th tirthankara of the present cosmic cycle, attained nirvana.

== Hindu religious observance ==
In parts of Nepal, Bihar and Eastern Uttar Pradesh, the festival is closely linked to Kshira Sagara (Ocean of Milk) and Vishnu's Anantarupa (form of Ananta). Fourteen tilakas (small vertical strips) of kumkuma or sindoor (vermilion powder) are made on a wooden plank. Fourteen puris (fried wheat bread) and 14 puas (deep fried sweet wheat bread) are placed on the vermilion strips. A bowl containing panchamrita (made of milk, curd, jaggery or sugar, honey and ghee) symbolizing the Ocean of Milk is placed on this wooden plank. A thread with 14 knots, symbolizing the Anantarupa of Vishnu, is wrapped on a cucumber and is swirled five times in the panchamrita. Later, this Ananta thread is tied on the right arm above the elbow by men. Women tie this on their left arm. This Ananta thread is removed after 14 days. In addition to the special rituals, devotees perform a fast (upavasa) on this day.

== See also ==
- Ganesh Chaturthi
- Cultural depictions of elephants
- Durga Puja
- Mantrapushpanjali
