= Jawahir Singh Kapur =

Sikh reformer, civil servant and author (1858-1910)

Bhai Sahib Jawahir Singh Kapur
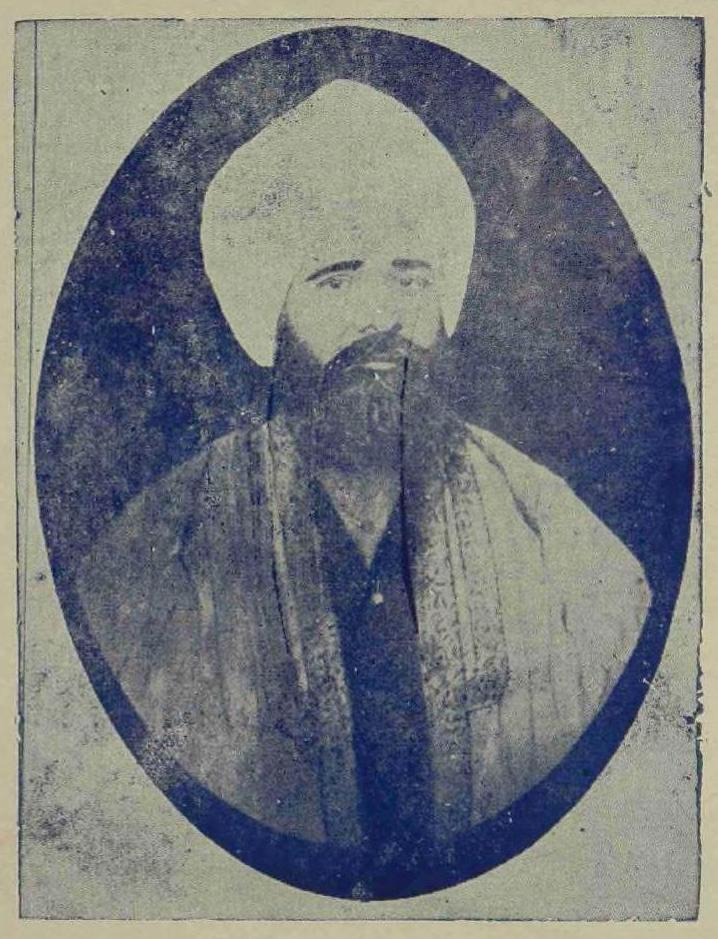
- Born: 1858; Amritsar, Punjab, British India
- Died: 14 May 1910 (aged 51–52); Lahore, Punjab, British India
- Education: Punjab University
- Occupations: Publicist; Polemist; Social reformer
- Years active: 1858-1910
- Known for: Singh Sabha Movement
- Board member of: Committee of Management of Maharaja Sher Singh's Samadh; Assessor/Juror in Lahore; Member of the Punjab Text Book Committee; Member of the Punjab Public Library
- Awards: Fellow of the Ajuman-I-Punjab; Elected member of the Calcutta Literary Society; Best Chronogram in Persian

Vice-President of Lahore Singh Sabha
- Preceded by: Diwan Buta Singh
- Succeeded by: Bhai Basant Singh

Bhai Jawahir Singh Kapur (1858- 14 May 1910) was a leading figure of the Singh Sabha Movement, specifically the Lahore Singh Sabha. He was a social reformer, a civil worker, a poet, writer and proponent of the Khalsa Diwan (Lahore).

In his youth he was a proponent of the Gulabdasi sect, then the Arya Samaj, and finally he worked to improve the status of his own community, the Sikhs. He was a leading Sikh figure in the late 1800s owing to his contributions to the Sikh community by giving speeches and publications. Though he did not actively participate in the literary brawls between the Amritsar and Lahore Singh Sabhas, he still used his Anglo-Vernacular education to his advantage to strengthen the Sikh message among the rural populations. He was also a moderate when it came to politics and issues during the time and created many controversies relating to his views.

After the excommunication of Prof. Gurmukh Singh in 1887, the unofficial title of leader of the Singh Sabha Movement fell on Bhai Jawahir Singh Kapur, till his death, and afterward on Sundar Singh Majithia.

"A highly intellectual man, of a handsome physique and suavity of manner that, added to his hospitality, won him the unstinted admiration and regard of his compatriots, particularly of the majority of the members of the Lahore Khalsa Diwan and the Khalsa College Council."

— Bhagat Lakshman Singh, Bhagat Lakshman Singh Autobiography

== Early life and family ==
Maharaja Ranjit Singh had made the Kapur family the hereditary Head Granthis of the Golden Temple due their historical relevance in Kirtan in Amritsar and the Golden Temple, specifically his grandfather Bhai Mohar Singh, the Head Granthi of the Golden Temple, Amritsar and his father Bhai Atma Singh Kapur, also a Granthi in the Golden Temple who had a landholding in the Gujranwala District. Jawahir Singh Kapur and was born in Amritsar, in 1858. It is unknown whether he had a wife or children.

=== Gulabdasi Sect ===
He was a follower of the Gulabdasi sect in his youth which was a materialistic sect that rose to prominence after the fall of the Sikh Empire in 1849. This was where he met his lifelong friend, Bhai Ditt Singh who also visited Gulabdasi congregations in his youth, especially in Rataul and Chatian Wala, where the saints Gulab Das and Piro Preman were born in. He was the inspiration for Bhai Ditt Singh, to move from the Gulabdasi sect to the Arya Samaj, and from there to the Singh Sabha.

Jawahir Singh Kapur was affiliated with one Sant Bahadur Singh. After a ban placed on the Gulabdasi sect by Maharaja Narinder Singh of Patiala, the sect rapidly declined, and most of them reverted to either Sikhism or Hinduism. The Khalsa Diwan (Amritsar) attacked Bhai Jawahir Singh Kapur and Bhai Ditt Singh for being Gulabdasis in the past, though neither of them paid much heed to the allegations. Jawahir Singh, although, did state that he wished to correct 'folk Sikhism'.

== Arya Samaji career ==
He joined the Arya Samaj along with Bhai Ditt Singh and Bhai Maya Singh. In 1883 he was one of the main promoters of the D.A.V. College and helped found it as well. Soon later at the age of 19 he became the President of Arya Samaj, Lahore. He was the head of Arya Paropkarini Sabha from 1878-1883. Originally the Arya Samaj and Sikhs were on good terms, though it did not last very long.

He broke all ties with the Arya Samaj on 25 November 1885, when an Arya Samaji preacher named Pandit Guru Dutta spoke derogatorily about Guru Nanak Dev and Guru Gobind Singh on the eleventh annual meeting of the Arya Samaj. The base of the Arya Samaj broke up as all Sikhs who supported it left the Arya Samaj and created the Lahore Singh Sabha to fight against the Hindu and Christian crusade against Sikhism.

Raja Bikram Singh Ahluwalia and Sir Attar Singh of Bhadaur invited him into the Lahore Singh Sabha so that they could use his services, and he could give his services to his own community.

== Sikh religious career ==
He left the Arya Samaj very bitter, and his first public appearance was addressing meetings in Amritsar telling his Sikh audiences that the Arya Samaj had its institutions to teach Sanskrit and the Vedas, the Muslims had made provision for the teaching of the Quran at Aligarh, but the Sikhs had no institution for the study of Gurmukhi and the Guru Granth. His biographical details distinctly represent many of the features that I have associated with an Évolué class: the high ritual standing of an upper caste; a bureaucratic job, Anglo-Vernacular education, familiarity and use of 'print culture' and an active promotion of new voluntary associations. Bhagat Lakshman Singh called him 'the most learned Sikh of his time'.

He was a prolific publicist and polemicist in the Khalsa Akhbar newspaper and was often editing and writing articles and poems for the newspaper.

=== Head Granthi of Golden Temple ===
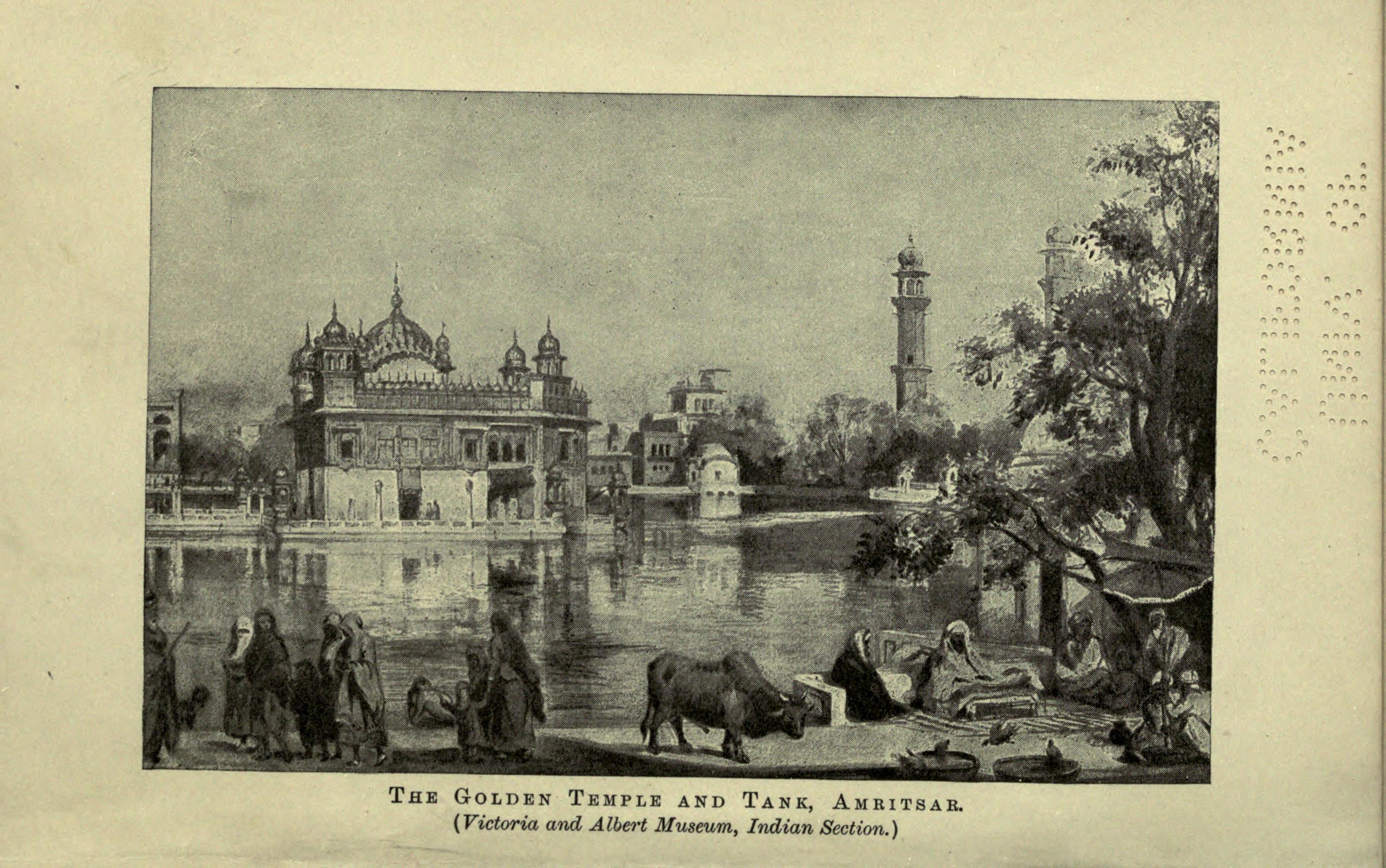
The Golden Temple and a Tank, Victoria and Albert Museum, London.

He had applied for the position of Head Granthi, Golden Temple in December 1885 and the position was narrowed down to two men, Bhai Harnam Singh and Bhai Jawahir Singh Kapur. His education (he spoke in five languages including Persian, Urdu, Sanskrit, Punjabi, and English) and the fact that his grandfather was the earlier Head Granthi improved his case. His candidature was rejected owing to his earlier religious affiliations and due to his earlier statements against Maharaja Duleep Singh. Though the civil administration and most Lahore Singh Sabha members wished for him to be the Head Granthi, he was far too controversial a figure and would not shy away from his socio-political viewpoints.

=== Arya Samaj ===
After leaving the Arya Samaj, he decided to launch an intellectual crusade against their stronghold in Rajputana State. He first published three books criticising the Arya Samaj and sent them to Maharana Sajjan Singh of Udaipur who was regarded as the head of Arya Samjists. The Maharana sent his thanks and dissociated from the Samaj the next year, the books are kept at the Khalsa College Library, Amritsar. Rajadhiraj Sir Nahar Singh Bahadur of Ajmer also promoted his literature against the Arya Samaj. There has been speculation that the Anti-Arya Samaji view of the ruler of Ajmer could have led to the lack of medical facilities provided to Dayananda Saraswati. There were multiple threats of lawsuits and violence against Jawahir Singh, but he was still unfazed by it and continued to publish and speak against the Arya Samaj.

== Political career ==
=== Indian National Congress ===
He spoke vehemently against the Indian National Congress in 1888, owing to more controversy. He stated that the Sikh community should remain aloof from their activities. The decision was unanimously approved by all members of the Singh Sabha, to not give support to the Indian National Congress during their annual meeting at Lahore and work for the Sikh community instead.

=== Maharaja Duleep Singh Controversy ===
In April 1886, Maharaja Duleep Singh professed that he would come back to India and embrace Sikhism in the Madras Presidency in an open letter. There were attempts to translate these feelings of sympathy towards the Maharaja into a political force by the Amritsar Singh Sabha and the Lahore Singh Sabha. Most of the supporters were Namdharis who were peasants, artisans and agriculturalists who had nothing to lose, but wished to see Punjab drowned in blood. One Bawa Nihal Singh had published a book called 'Khurshid Khalsa', which emphasised that Duleep Singh would expel the British and receive prime ministership over the Punjab. He was expelled by all Singh Sabhas in April 1886, until he received a pardon from the British Government. All Singh Sabhas but Amritsar, Rawalpindi and Faridkot accepted the expulsion. During the festivities of the establishment of Guru Nanak Panth Parkash Sabha, Lahore on 31 October 1887 the Amritsar Singh Sabha leaders placed a photograph of Maharaja Duleep Singh on a Gaddi and put flowers, garlands, and lit lamps on the occasion in Guru Ram Das' birthplace, Jawahir Singh expelled all the leaders who took part in the blasphemous event and expelled the priest-in-charge of the temple the next morning.

==== Meeting with the Exiled Princesses of Punjab ====
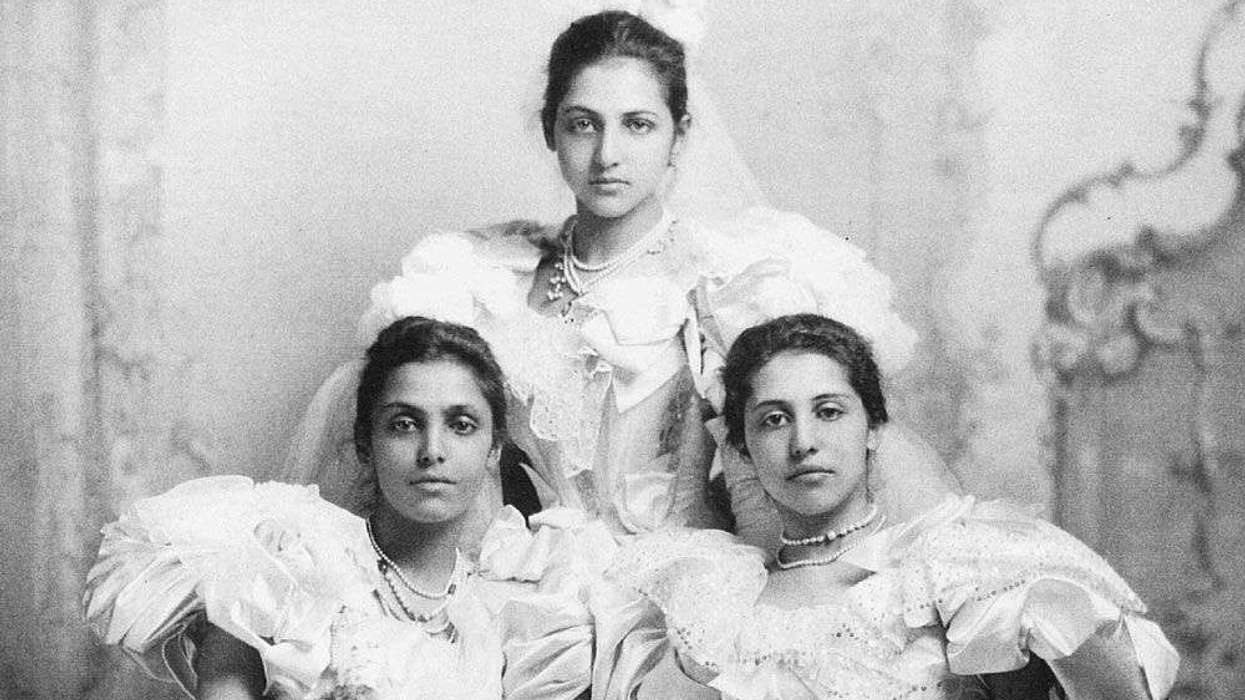
Bamba, Catherine and Sophia Duleep Singh.

He had a secret meeting with Princess Sophia Duleep Singh and Princess Bamba Sutherland as they were doing a secret trip across their lands. They were the granddaughters of Maharaja Ranjit Singh, Emperor of the Punjab, Jammu & Kashmir and the North Western Frontier Province. Bhai Jawahir Singh, who had been invited one day to see the princesses at the bungalow where they had been lodged, took Bhagat Lakshman Singh with him. Arriving there he left the Bhagat in his hackney carriage on the road and went to report himself. Before he was admitted in, he accosted an old Muslim nobleman and exchanged a few words with him. When he returned half an hour after he seemed to have been deeply moved. Apparently the Faqir cried like a child, because he could not bear the sight of the grand-daughters of the illustrious benefactor of his family living as guests in the very capital of the Empire over which their father and the mighty grandfather had held high positions. Rai Bahadur Kunj Behari Thapar was a scion of the Faqir's family.

== Representing the Sikh community ==
Bhai Jawahir Singh approached Viceroy of India, Lord Frederick Hamilton of Dufferin in November 1888 and read the Khalsa Diwan Farewell Address to his excellency in the Government House, Lahore. He pressed the claim that the Sikhs were a separate community and nation. He also stated that the natives (referring to Sikhs) should have the lion's share in their own loaves and fishes. This secured a promise from Lord Dufferin to help in the Sikh cause of education. Sir James Broadwood Lyall also kindly promised to help in the matter.

Bhai Jawahir Singh read the Khalsa Diwan welcome Address to Sir Dennis Fitzpatrick in the Lawrence Hall, Lahore, on 20 April 1892. He emphasised the relevance of Sikhs being taught in their mother tongue, Punjabi, as a staple medium for media communication. Bhai Jawahir Singh acted as Sikh Secretary to the committee of Reception to Lord Frederick Roberts of Roberts formed at Lahore in December 1892, and he read the Sikh Address to His Excellency in the Jubilee Town Hall at a large gathering held early in January 1893.

Bhai Jawahir Singh read the Welcome Address of the Khalsa Diwan to Sir Mackworth Young on 24 April 1897, in the Lawrence Hall, Lahore. Shortly afterwards Bhai Jawahir Singh presented the General Sikh Address to Lord James Bruce of Elgin, at Simla on 26 June 1897, on the occasion of the Diamond Jubilee of Her Late Majesty. In his letter dated 10 June 1897, the Hon’ble Mr. Dane wrote to the Bhai who was Secretary to the Deputation as under: “I am to add that as the Address purports to be from Princes, Chiefs and people of the Panjab, it would be well if possible to have it signed by some at any rate of the Sikh Princes.”

Accordingly Bhai Jawahir Singh obtained the signatures of Maharaja Rajinder Singh of Patiala, Raja Hira Singh of Nabha and Raja Ranbir Singh of Sangrur. The Raja of Kapurthala being then in London, the signature of Sardar Bhagat Singh, C.I.E., Prime Minister, was obtained. The Raja of Faridkot had authorised his name to be put on the Address, but Mr. Dane in letter No. 407 S. of 24 June 1901, informed the Bhai that his Casket and Address had already been sent to the Government of India, and as the Raja of Faridkot had sent in a separate Address, he thought, he (Bhai Jawahir Singh) would hardly think it necessary to add his name to the General Khalsa Address.

On 5 April 1899, Bhai Jawahir Singh read the Khalsa Diwan Address to Lord George Curzon of Kedleston in the Government House, Lahore. In this Address the Government was asked to encourage the publication of the new translation in English of the Sikh Scriptures. Max Arthur Macauliffe's books were edited by him and sent out for publication a while later. He praised Jawahir Singh Kapur stating, “I should be glad if you, as one of the foremost among the enlightened Sikhs, would kindly lend your aid in obtaining proper remuneration for my labours.”

At the request of certain representative Sikhs, Bhai Jawahir Singh prepared the Coronation Address in the name of the whole of the Sikh community as was done by him for the Diamond Jubilee Address in 1897, but in obedience to the wish of the Punjab Government as conveyed in Mr. Burton on 15 July 1902, to Mr. Younghusband, the Coronation Address was altered and reprinted in the name of Khalsa Diwan which body was subsequently asked to and did adopt it.

== Civil Service career ==
After graduating from school he entered service in the Sind-Punjab and Delhi Railway Company in 1876, and then attended law classes for a year at Punjab University. In January 1886 he joined the North-Western Railways and slowly rose through the ranks and became Superintendent North-Western Railways. His early exposure to western norms of rationality, modernity, and scientific knowledge and to the emerging 'print culture' led him to a life of devotion to associational activities. He inaugurated Lansdowne Bridge at Sakkhar in 1889, the Governor of Bombay, Donald Mackay, 11th Lord Reay, had presented him with the award of 'Best Chronogram in Persian'. Appointed member of the Committee of Management of Maharaja Sher Singh's Samadh at Shah Bilawal, Lahore in July 1897. He was also an Assossor/Juror in Lahore. He had friendly relations with Patiala, Nabha, Jind and Kapurthala, present in the only photo with Maharaja Bhupinder Singh and Maharaja Ripudaman Singh, he was given the unofficial title of "The Bhai Sahib" by the states of Patiala, Nabha and Jind. He also had cordial relations with the Maharanas of Rajputana, including (Shahpura) Ajmer, Udaipur and Jodhpur.

=== Khalsa College ===
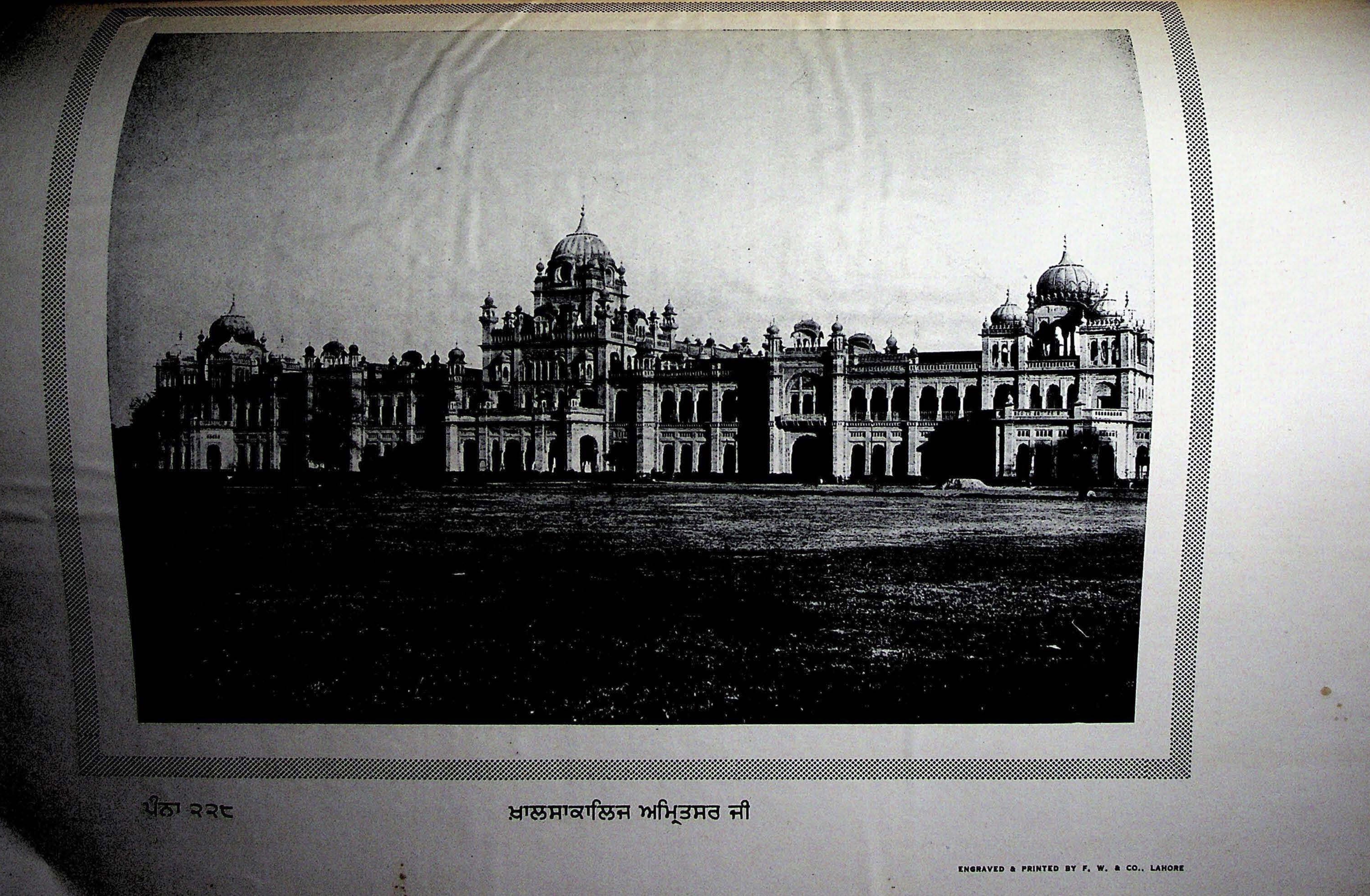
Khalsa College in Amritsar, published in the Mahan Kosh (1930).

After the Amritsar Singh Sabha was long forgotten and the rise of the Lahore Singh Sabha had started, they began to create a college for Sikhs. An Englishman, Dr. S. C. Oman, was appointed the principal. The Chief Justice of the Punjab High Court, W. H. Rattigan, became president of the college establishment committee, which was controlled by the Vice-President, Sir Attar Singh of Bhadaur, and the secretary, Jawahir Singh Kapur. The five founders of the Khalsa College were Sir James Broadwood Lyall, Sir Attar Singh of Bhadaur, Gurdial Singh Mann of Nabha, Diwan Gurmukh Singh of Patiala and Bhai Jawahir Singh Kapur of Lahore. Financial contributions were made by the states of Patiala, Jind, Kapurthala, Nabha and Kalsia along with Sunder Singh Majithia.

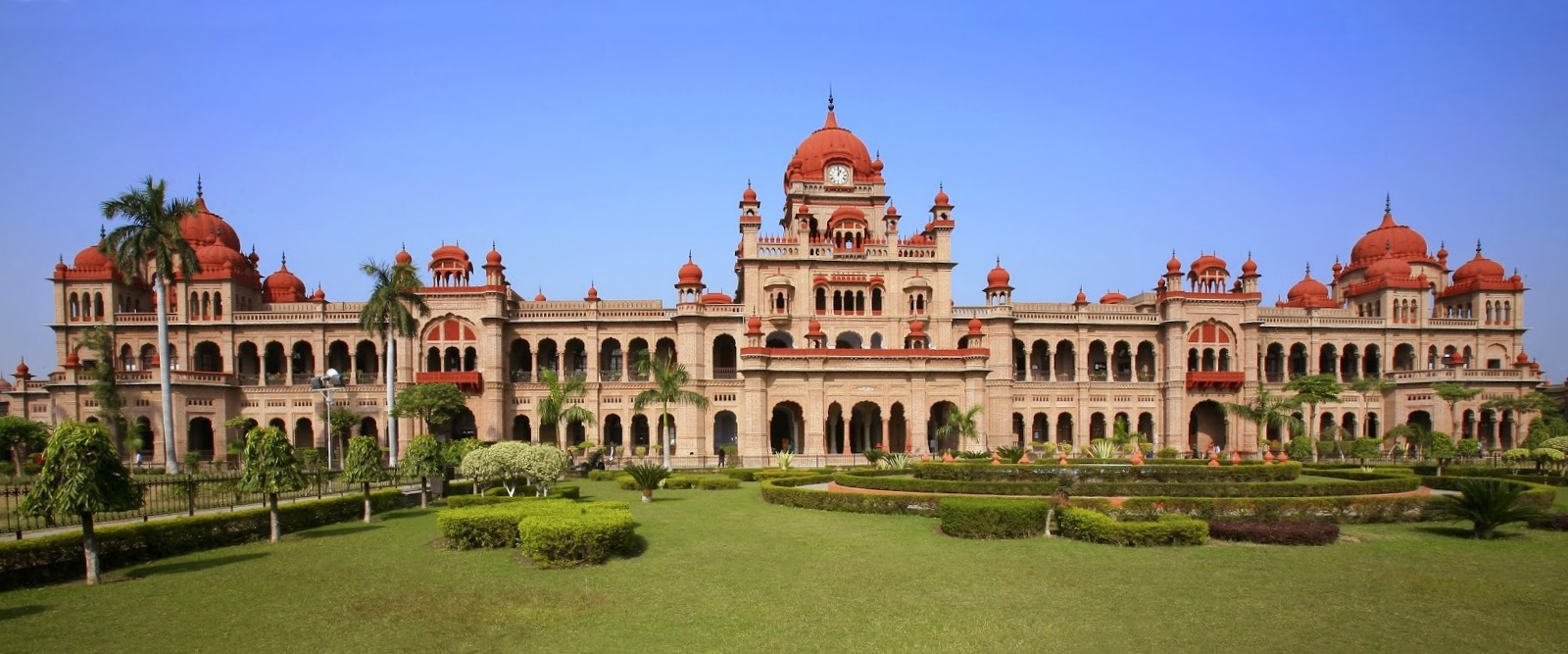
Photograph of the Khalsa College.

The committee founded the Khalsa College and the academic programme started in 1894. Jawahir Singh Kapur and Sunder Singh Majithia were pioneers in the establishment of the Khalsa College. The Sikhs maharajas made their contribution financially and Bhai Jawahir Singh served as secretary of the Khalsa College managing committee for 20 years. Meanwhile, Mohindra College was set up at Patiala by Maharaja Patiala and Randhir College at Kapurthala by the Raja of Kapurthala.

== Literary career ==
In 1885 he was appointed Fellow of the Anjuman-I-Punjab in recognition of his services to Sikh literature and education. Bhai Jawahir Singh was elected as a member of the Calcutta Literary Society in September 1897. In November 1899 he became a member of the Punjab Text Book Committee. He was a live member of the Punjab Public Library and had his own library, which was the largest in Lahore known as the Jawahir Library. He was appointed by the Punjab University as an Examiner of the Budhiman, Widhwan and Giani Examinations of the Oriental College, Lahore. Fellow of the Punjab university in November 1904. "Bhai Jawahir Singh- Allow me to congratulate you as the best poet of all we tried", stated the director of the North-Western Railway. Pressed claims of the Punjabi language in 1882 in front of the Hunter Commission.

== Death ==
He died at the age of 52 in Lahore, Punjab, British India, after a brief illness on 14 May 1910. Bhagat Lakshman Singh wrote an obituary for the death of the Lahore Singh Sabha mentioning the role of Bhai Jawahir Singh Kapur.

For several decades they had worked for the uplift of the community at a tremendous sacrifice and in the teeth of an opposition under which hearts less brave would have quailed. They were men of humble means. They could not trace high lineage. But they were giants among men and what they achieved was with their own moral and intellectual strength with which they were plentifully endowed. They were the founders of the Singh Sabha Movement. Practically it began with them and died with them to all ends and purposes. Its soul departed with them, leaving its skeleton behind. They were strangers to Lahore and left it as strangers without leaving any impressions behind. The first to die was Bhai Ditt Singh. He owed much to Bhai Jawahir Singh who was in fact his brains, his chief source of inspiration, to whom he clung fast, except during the last few months of this false world, when he wavered under the bewitching ways of his erstwhile opponents, who wanted to win him over and thus get into the good books of a host of his admirers. Neither do I remember having seen Bhai Jawahir Singh, thereafter, who, too, died (14 May 1910) in harness not long after, holding his head erect and retaining to the last his dignity and grace for which he was so much loved and respected."

— Bhagat Lakshman Singh, Bhagat Lakshman Singh Autobiography

== Publications ==
He has 18 works, 43 publications in 5 languages, and 89 library holdings to his credit. Two of them were reviewed well by British newspapers like the Homeland Mail, these include Itihas-I-Hind or The Poverty of India, and Dharam Vichar or Thoughts on Duty. Some of his works include:

- Itihas-I-Hind or The Poverty of India
- Dharam Vichar or Thoughts on Duty
- Khalsa Dharam or The Khalsa's Duty
- A Guide to Punjabi in the Gurmukhi Script
- Dayananda Itihas or Thoughts of Dayananda
- Amal-i-Arya or Acts of the Aryas
- Radd-I-Baltan
- Taryaq-I-Sarasvati Phobia
- Japji Sahib (Urdu translation)
- Sikhan De Raj Di Vithia (1901), English translation of an original book written by Sharda Ram Phillauri

== Gallery ==
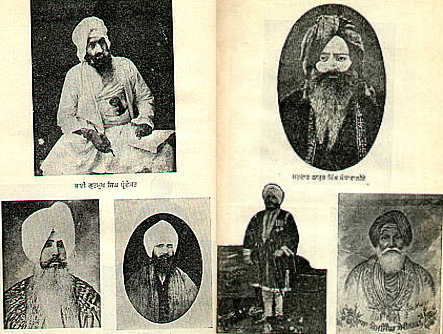
Bhai Jawahir Singh Kapur on a list of prominent Singh Sabha members. He is bottom-right on the first page, or bottom-centre left in the image.

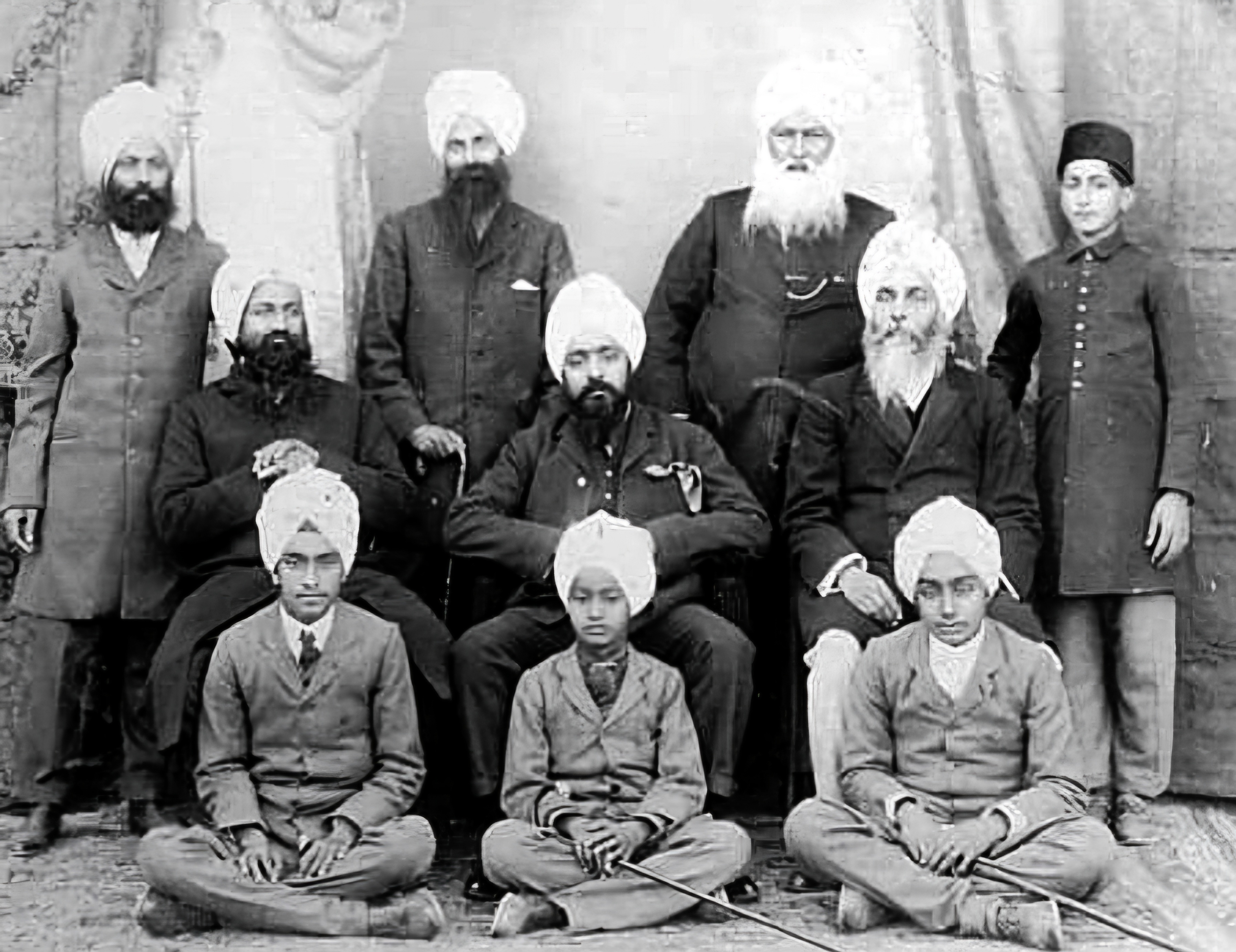
Sitting on chairs are Bhai Jawahir Singh Kapur, Maharaja Ripudaman Singh and Bhai Kahn Singh Nabha.

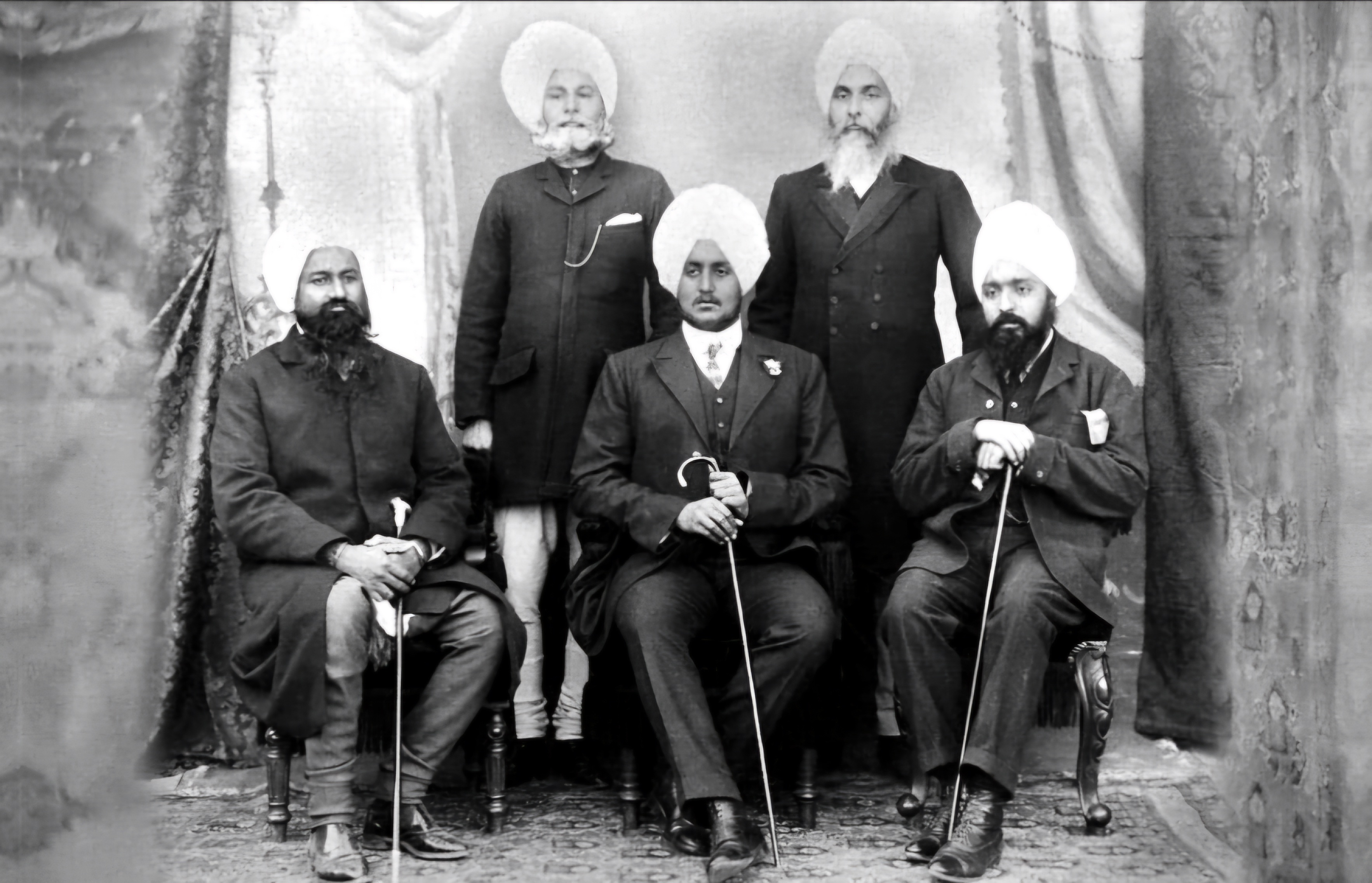
Sitting are Bhai Jawahir Singh Kapur of Lahore, Maharaja Bhupinder Singh of Patiala, Maharaja Ripudaman Singh of Nabha and standing are Raja Gurdit Singh of Retgarh and Bhai Kahn Singh of Nabha.
