= Om Jai Jagdish Hare =

Hindi Hindu hymn dedicated to Vishnu (1870)

- by Shardha Ram Phillauri
- Genre: Hymn, Aarti, Religious music
- Written: c. 1870
- Language: Hindi

Om Jai Jagdish Hare (Hindi: ॐ जय जगदीश हरे) is a Hindu religious song written by Shardha Ram Phillauri. It is a Hindi-language composition dedicated to the deity Vishnu, popularly sung during the ritual of arti.

It has been described as a "film arti" due to its inclusion in the film Purab Aur Paschim (1970), after which it became immensely popular such that it entered temple pujas. Due to its popularisation by Bollywood cinema, it has been described as a "national arti" that is sung on any given religious occasion. In the late 1980s, it was associated with younger educated people whose notions of religious ritual had had greater influence from Hindi cinema than local religious tradition.

== Significance ==
During aarti, or the circling of a murti with an oil lamp or camphor flame, this bhajan is sung as universal regardless of god; Joyce Flueckinger and Paul Brians note it as a "universal aarti",, while Om Lata Bahadur states its use for gods as diverse as Krishna, Ganesha, and Murugan. Additionally, Jacqueline Hirst and John Zavos have noted its use in locations as disparate as New Delhi, Toledo, and Leicester.

== Lyrics ==
Original (Hindi transliteration)	English translation
Om Jai Jagdish Hare, Swami Jai Jagdish Hare; Bhakt jano ke sankat Das jano ke sankat Kshan mein door kare Om Jai Jagdish Hare	Oh Lord of the whole Universe, Mighty Lord of the whole Universe, All Thy devotees’ agonies, All Thy devotees’ sorrows Instantly Thou banisheth, Oh Lord of the whole Universe.
Joe dhyave phal paave Dhukh binse mann ka Swami dukh binse mann ka Sukh sampati ghar ave Kasht mite tan ka Om Jai Jagdish Hare	He who’s immersed in devotion, He reaps the fruits of Thy love. Lord, he reaps the fruits of Thy love. Floating in a cloud of comforts, Free from all the worldly problems, Oh Lord of the whole Universe.
Maat pita tum mere Sharan gahun mein kiski Tum bin aur na duja Prabhu bin aur na duja Aas dharun mein jiski Om Jai Jagdish Hare	Thou art Mother and Father, At Thy feet I seek eternal truth. Lord, at Thy feet I seek eternal truth. There’s none other than Thee, Lord. Guardian of all our hopes, Oh Lord of the whole Universe.
Tum puran parmatma Tum antaryaami, Swami tum antaryaami Paar Brahma Parmeshwar; Paar Brahma Parmeshwar; Tum sab ke Swami; Om Jai Jagdish Hare	Thou art Godly perfection, Omnipotent Master of all. Lord, omnipotent Master of all. My destiny’s in Thy Hand, My destiny’s in Thy Hand. Supreme Soul of all Creation, Oh Lord of the whole Universe.
Tum karuna ke sagar Tum palan karta, Swami tum palan karta Mein murakh khal kami Mein murakh khal kami Kripa karo bharta Om Jai Jagdish Hare	Thou art an ocean of mercy, Gracious protector of all. Lord, gracious protector of all, I’m Thy humble devotee. Grant me Thy divine grace. Oh Lord of the whole Universe.
Tum ho ek agochar Sub ke pranpati, Swami sab ke pranpati Kis vidh miloon Dayamay; Kis vidh miloon Dayamay; Tum ko mein kumati Om Jai Jagdish Hare	Thou art beyond all perception, Formless and yet multiform. Lord, Grant me a glimpse of Thyself, Guide me along the path to Thee. Oh Lord of the whole Universe.
Dheen Bandhu dhukh harta Thakur tum mere, Swami rakshak tum mere Apne haath oothao Apne haath oothao Dwar pari (para) tere Om Jai Jagdish Hare	Friend of the helpless and feeble, Benevolent saviour of all. Lord, Offer me Thy hand of compassion. I seek refuge at Thy feet. Oh Lord of the whole Universe.
Vishya vikar Mitavo; Paap haro deva, Swami pap haro deva Shradha bhakti badhao Shradha bhakti badhao Santan ki seva Om Jai Jagdish Hare	Surmounting the earthly desires, Free from the sins of this life. Lord, Undivided faith and devotion, In eternal service unto Thee. Oh Lord of the whole Universe.
Om Jai Jagdish Hare, Swami Jai Jagdish Hare; Bhakt jano ke sankat Das jano ke sankat Kshan mein door kare Om Jai Jagdish Hare	Oh Mighty Lord of the whole Universe, All Thy devotees’ agonies, All Thy devotees’ sorrow Instantly Thou banisheth. Oh Lord of the whole Universe.

== Popular culture ==
- In the 1952 movie, Anand Math, the Govinda damodar Stotram of Sri BilvaMangala Thakura is adapted with the Jai Jagdish Hare refrain.(video search)
- In Purab Aur Paschim (1970), the prayer symbolizes the continuity of the Indian tradition before and after India's independence.(video search)
- In the 2001 movie, Freddy Got Fingered, the prayer is chanted while Gord (played by Tom Green) delivers a baby and swings it through its umbilical cord to wake it up.
- The prayer inspired the movie "Om Jai Jagadish" in 2002.
- In the Movie "Baghban (2003 film)", as a prayer (Aarti) "Om Jai Jagdish" in the voice of Udit Narayan & Sneha Pant.
