= Bhagyawati =

Early Hindi novel

Bhagyawati is an 1877 novel by Shardha Ram Phillauri. The book is now acknowledged as one of the first novels in Standard Hindi. Later, Lala Sri Niwas had written his Hindi novel Pariksha guru, which was published in 1882. Bhagyawati is believed to have been written mainly in Amritsar.

== Description ==
According to The Tribune (India), the novel was written specifically to "bring an awakening" amongst Indian women. The book's main character was a woman, and it offered a progressive perspective on women's rights and status. At a time when widow remarriage were considered unholy and impure, child marriage was common, neglect of education, the novel advocated widow marriage, condemned child marriage, and affirmed the equality of male and female children. The book was often given to daughters at marriage as a part of the dowry.
