= Shardha Ram Phillauri =

Indian writer, poet and social reformer (1837–1881)

Pandit Shardha Ram Phillauri Phillauri
- Born: Shardha Ram; September 1837; Phillaur, Dallewalia Misl, Sikh Empire
- Died: 24 June 1881 (aged 43); Lahore, Punjab Province, British India
- Occupations: Writer, poet, social Reformer
- Spouse: Mehtab Kaur
- Writing career
- Language: Punjabi, Hindi, Sanskrit
- Notable works: Om Jai Jagdish Hare; Bhagyawati; Sikhan De Raj Di Vithia; Punjabi Batcheet; Satya Dharm Muktavli; Shatopadesh; Satyamrit Pravaha

Shardha Ram Phillauri (September 1837 – 24 June 1881) was an Indian writer, poet and social reformer, known for his contributions to Hindi and Punjabi literature. He is best known for his Hindu arti (religious hymn) Om Jai Jagdish Hare and Bhagyawati, one of the first novels in Hindi. Phillauri has also been called the "father of modern Punjabi prose". Born in Phillaur, he visited cities across Punjab and died in Lahore in 1881. He was proficient in the Punjabi, Hindi, Urdu, and Sanskrit languages.

== Early life ==
Shardha Ram was born in September 1837, to a Punjabi Hindu Brahmin family in the town of Phillaur in the Sikh Empire under the reign of Ranjit Singh. His father, Jai Dyalu, was an astrologer. Their gotra was Moudgil. His father was a hereditary priest of the Bhandari Khatris of Phillaur. He did not have any formal education as such. By age ten, he had studied Hindi, Sanskrit, Persian, astrology, and music. He learnt classical Indian music from his father. At Rishikesh he studied the Vedic and Uppanashadic literature of Hinduism. Later, he was also a missionary of traditional Hinduism (Sanatana dharma), with him revering the Vedas, Puranas, and Dharamashastras. He was able to publicly recite the Mahabharata, Ramayana, and Bhagvata Purana by the time he was nineteen.

== Career ==
He began working as a translator for the Christian missionaries at the American Presbyterian Mission of Ludhiana, namely Reverend J. Newton, and taught the missionaries the local languages.

At Phillaur, he was commissioned by the British to write works, such as the Sikhan de Raj di Vithya in 1865. In his books, Shardha Ram documented Punjabi culture and language. He later became a Hindu street-preacher. Shardha Ram gave forceful lectures on the Mahabharata, and because of this was charged with conducting propaganda against the British government in 1865. As a result, he was exiled temporarily from his home town, Phillaur. Sharda Ram often visited Amritsar and adjoining Lahore, especially in connection with astrology. During this time, he earned a reputation as an astrologer and wrote several books in Hindi. Between 1867–68, he co-founded alongside Munshi Yamuna Prasad a Hindu school in Ludhiana that taught Sanskrit and Persian. He also founded a Hindu Sabha at Ludhiana to propagate the religion, it was the Hindu Dharm Prakashik Sabha with a printing-press to produce Hindu literature.

== Death ==
Shardha Ram died on 24 June 1881, aged 43, at Lahore.

== Works ==
In 1886, Sikhan De Raj Di Vithia (Punjabi: The Story of Sikh Rule, first written in 1865) he published, an account of Sikh religion and the rule of Maharaja Ranjit Singh. The last of its three chapters documents Punjabi culture and language, including its customs, usages, and folk songs. The book was often prescribed as a text book.

Shardha Ram has recently been acknowledged as having written the first novel in Hindi. His novel Bhagyawati, believed to have been written mainly in Amritsar, was first published in 1888, after Shardha Ram's death. The novel's portrayal of women and women's rights was progressive for its day.

Work	Year	Language	Description	References
Sikhan De Raj Di Vithia (The Story of Sikh Rule)	1865	Punjabi	The book is an account of Sikh religion and the rule of Maharaja Ranjit Singh. The last of its three chapters documents Punjabi culture and language, including its customs, usages, and folk songs. The book was often prescribed as a text book.	
Dharm Kasauti	1874	Urdu		
Satya Dharm Muktawali	1875	Urdu		
Dharm Samvad	1876	Urdu		
Punjabi Batcheet	1876	Punjabi	This book was specifically written to help the British understand the local dialect. It may have been the first book transliterated into Roman script from Gurmukhi script. The study of this was a requirement for admission into the administrative services. The book is taught to this day at schools affiliated with the Punjab School Education Board (PSEB) Mohali.	
Bhagyawati	1877	Hindi	This book is believed to be the first novel in Hindi.	
Om Jai Jagdish Hare	1870s	Punjabi	Translated in Punjabi the first time	
Shatopadesh	1886	Hindi	Published posthumously.	
Satyamrit Pravaha	Unknown			
Bijmantra	Unknown			
Ramlakamdhenu	Unknown			
