= Baarmati religion =

Religion founded by Dhani Matang Dev around 1100 AD

The Baarmati religion, also called the Barmati Panth, is a religious tradition founded by the saint Matang Dev in the 1100s. It developed in the Sinth region of modern Pakistan and also parts of western India, fusing Hindu Tantric practices, Nath traditions, Vedantic philosophy and the elements of Nizari Ismaili Islam.

Its followers use Ginans (sacred verses) in religious ceremonies and they believe in powers associated with figures like Shiva and Shakti. They believe these rituals are intended to provide spiritual comfort and purification. Historically, the Barmati tradition also offered marginalized communities, especially the Meghwar community, a shared religious identity.

== History ==
The religion was founded in the 12th century by the saint Matang Dev in the Sindh region. It developed within communities that faced discrimination as a result of the caste system. The tradition was shaped by several religious philosophies, including Hindu Tantric practices, Nath traditions, Vedantic philosophy and the elements of Nizari Ismaili Islam.

After Matang Dev, other religious leaders helped develop the tradition. Lurang Dev, Matai Dev and Mamai Dev helped contribute to Barmati's religious teachings and literature. The Ginans described its beliefs, rituals and powers associated with its gurus. These writings were composed in Kutchi, Sindhi and Saurashtri and were preserved through manuscripts.

During the medieval period, followers performed ceremonies that were intended to give spiritual protection and relief. The tradition also developed different types of worship involving Shiva, Shakti and other figures. However, Barmati rejected particular practices associated with other Tantric groups, separating their own religious customs from theirs.

In the modern era, Barmati's history is documented in its Ginans, manuscripts, shrines and continuing religious practices, albeit much of its sacred literature hasn't been collected and published in a singular complete edition.

== Beliefs ==
Followers believe that Mamai Dev died around 1415 CE and commemorate his death every year with a pilgrimage known as Jāţar, held on the fourth day of the dark moon of Vaishakh based off of the Hindu calendar at this shrine in Makli, Thatta.

== See also ==
- Satpanth
- Panchorath Yuga
- Mamaidev
