= Sikhān de Rāj dī Vithiā =

1865 historical work on Sikhs

Sikhan de Raj di Vithya ("History of Sikh Rule") is a 1865 Punjabi work by Shardha Ram Phillauri written by him while he was commissioned by the British colonial administration of Punjab. It was written for a British audience to educate them on the region's history, covering Guru Nanak to the annexation of the Sikh Empire in 1849. It is divided into three parts: the first on the Sikh gurus (with many factual errors present), the second covers the period of Sikh-rule till annexation, the third part covers Punjabi customs, rites, folk-songs, pro-verbs, and religious sects. The work concludes with Janamsakhi anecdotes.

Louis E. Fenech dates the original work to 1868, with K. S. Thapar stating it was written in 1866 and published in 1868. An English translation of the work under the title History of the Sikhs was published in 1888 by Henry Court with the assistance of Pandit Nihal Chand of Lahore. Another English translation of the work by Jawahir Singh was published in 1901, with an introduction section covering the errors of the original work. According to Thapar, the work is rife with errors due to its original author not being well-versed with Sikh theology and history.
