= Karmayogi =

Karmayogi may refer to

- Karmayogi (1978 film), an Indian Hindi-language film by Ram Maheshwari
- Karmayogi (2012 film), an Indian Malayalam-language film by V. K. Prakash, adaptation of Shakespeare's Hamlet

== See also ==
- Karma yoga, a spiritual path in Hinduism
- Karma Yoga (book), a 1896 book of lectures by Swami Vivekananda
- Karma Yoga (Bhagavad Gita), the third chapter of the Bhagavad Gita
