= Chandra Hirjee =

Indian billiards and snooker player (1924–1989)

Personal information
- Nickname: The Stylist
- Born: c. 1924 Calcutta, Bengal Presidency, British India
- Died: c. 1989 (aged 65) Kolkata, West Bengal, India

Sport
- Sport: Snooker

Tournament wins
- World Championship: 1958

Chandra Hirjee
Medal record

Men's english billiards

Representing India

Indian Open Billiards Championship
Gold medal – first place	1946	Singles
Gold medal – first place	1947	Singles
Silver medal – second place	1952	Singles
Silver medal – second place	1954	Singles
Silver medal – second place	1955	Singles
Gold medal – first place	1956	Singles
Silver medal – second place	1957	Singles
Gold medal – first place	1958	Singles

Men's snooker

Representing India

Indian Snooker Championship
Silver medal – second place	1952	Singles
Silver medal – second place	1953	Singles
Silver medal – second place	1954	Singles
Silver medal – second place	1955	Singles
Silver medal – second place	1956	Singles
Silver medal – second place	1957	Singles
Silver medal – second place	1958	Singles

Chandrasinh Hirjee Jewraj (1924–1989), known simply as Chandu to friends and fans and often referred to by the media as The Stylist, was an Indian amateur billiards and snooker player. He represented Bengal and India in domestic and world championships - the World Amateur Billiards Championship and the World Amateur Snooker Championship. He won the inaugural World Amateur Snooker Championship held at Kolkata (then Calcutta) in 1958. He was also Indian Open Billiards Championship winner in 1946, 47, 56 and 58, runner-up in 1952, 54, 55, 57 and Indian Snooker Championship runner-up in 1952, 53, 54, 55, 56, 57 and 58.
