= Babla & Kanchan =

Indian musician duo

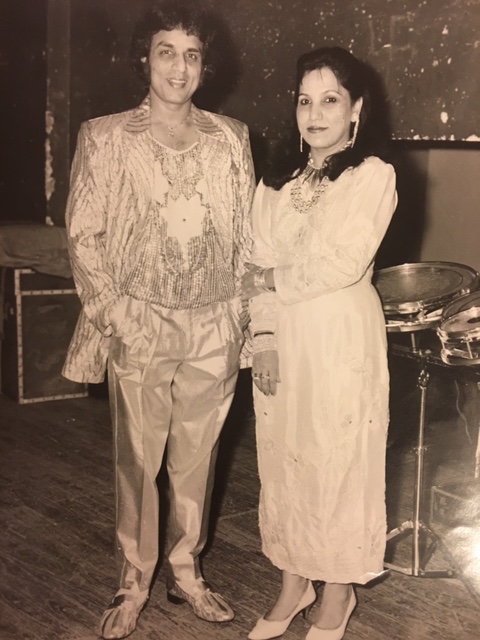
Babla & Kanchan

Laxmichand "Babla" Virji Shah and Kumari Kanchan Dinkarrao Mali-Shah were an Indian husband-wife musical group best known for work in the chutney music and Desi Folk music genres. They performed together for forty years until Kanchan died in 2004. Babla Shah is the younger brother of famous music director duo Kalyanji Anandji.

== Biography ==
Babla was born as Laxmichand Virji Shah, son of Virji Shah, into a Kutchi Jain family of trading background. His family hailed from the village of Kundrodi in Kutch, Gujarat. His father had moved to Mumbai and set up a shop in Girgaum. The music director duo of Kalyanji and Anandji are Babla's elder brothers.

Babla sang some songs for films and also tried his hand at music direction like his older brothers. According to film music expert Rajesh Subramanian, the song "Khaike Pan Banaraswala" was composed by Babla. He felt the need to differentiate himself from his famous brothers and he took up folk music-with-western-elements as his niche genre of music. He made this selection because he had a taste and talent for this type of hybrid music, as also a liking for live performance. He started his band in 1962, and the venture met with success. A form of traditional folk dance from the state of Gujarat called Dandiya Raas or Raas Garba was musically redefined (with western elements and instruments) by Shah in the 1970s. In 1980, he released an electronic disco album, Babla's Disco Sensation, which notably made early use of the Roland TR-808 drum machine. In 2011, Shah was awarded the Radio Mirchi Music Award for Outstanding Contribution to Hindi Film Music. Unfortunately, Kanchan was not there to cherish the moment. She had died in 2004. Today, Shah is a drummer, percussionist, live performing artist, composer and record producer.

Kumari Kanchan Dinkarrao Mali was born into a Hindu family of Marathi background. She was the daughter of Dinakar Rao Mali. She was a talented singer and her songs are there in the films Rafoo Chakkar, Dharmatma and Qurbani, all of whose music was scored by Kalyanji-Anandji. Kanchan's songs in these films included Kya Khoob Lagti Ho -- Phir Se kaho and Laila Oh Laila, which remain popular even today. Yet she did not get adequate recognition, despite the support of Babla's older brothers, and the reason was again (as with Babla) the need to differentiate her voice and style from that of other established singers. Perhaps for this reason, her career as a playback singer for Hindi films was rather limited. She distinguished herself by moving to chutney and chutney-soca, which was sung in Bhojpuri, a language popular throughout the Indian diaspora of descendants of indentured laborers. She found greater success there. Her solo albums like Kaise Bani were popular with the Indian diaspora. Her popularity even led to product endorsement deals for various consumer brands including Johnson & Johnson. She had meanwhile become close to Kalyanji-Anandji and their family. She married Babla and joined her husband's troupe or band.

The husband-wife duo performed and toured around the globe together. Their international engagements in chutney and chutney-soca music kept them away from Hindi (Bollywood) film music, which they gradually abandoned. The decade of the 1980s was their heyday for live performances. They were mostly popular among Indians in Trinidad and Tobago, Guyana, Suriname, other Caribbean countries, Fiji, South Africa, Mauritius, and their diasporas in Canada, the United States, the United Kingdom, the Netherlands, Australia, and New Zealand. They covered soca hits like Hot Hot Hot. They also revived older hits by other chutney singer such as Sundar Popo from Trinidad and Tobago, Neisha Benjamin, Halima Bissoon and Kassri Narine from Guyana, and Bidjanwatie Chaitoe from Suriname. Due to their extensive touring support, their LP albums including Kuch Gadbad Hai sold well for an Indian group traveling abroad.

== Songs ==
Many of Babla & Kanchan's songs were remakes of older chutney songs or were soca classics with Hindi lyrics.

- "Kaise Bani" (originally by Sundar Popo)
- "Chaadar Bechaow" (originally by Sundar Popo)
- "Benji Darling" (originally by Neisha Benjamin)
- "Ai Ai O" ("Buss Up Shot" by Baron)
- "Kuch Garbar" Hai ("Hot Hot Hot" by Arrow)
- "Tiny Winy" ("Tiny Winey" by Byron Lee & The Dragonaires)
- "Kuch Kuch Baby" ("Rock It" by Merchant)
- "Hum Na Jaibe" (originally by Sundar Popo)
- "Na Manu" (originally by Bidjanwatie Chaitoe)
- "Leggo Me Na Raja" (originally by Halima Bissoon)

== Family ==
The couple has two children, daughter Nisha and son Vaibhav. Nisha toured with her parents since birth. Vaibhav is a drummer on the TV show Sa Re Ga Ma Pa Lil' Champs.
