= Muqaddar Ka Sikandar =

Muqaddar Ka Sikandar may refer to:

- Muqaddar Ka Sikandar (1978 film), an Indian Hindi-language film
- Muqaddar Ka Sikandar (1984 film), a Pakistani Urdu-language film
