= Joyce Burkhalter Flueckiger =

American anthropologist

- Occupation: Anthropologist
- Spouse: Michael Flueckiger
- Awards: Guggenheim Fellowship (2014)

Academic background
- Education: Goshen College; University of Wisconsin-Madison
- Thesis: Study of a Central Indian Folklore Region: Chhattisgarh (1984)
- Doctoral advisor: Velcheru Narayana Rao

Academic work
- Discipline: Religious studies
- Sub-discipline: Religion and gender; Gender in India
- Institutions: Emory University

Joyce Burkhalter Flueckiger is an American anthropologist who specializes in the intersection of religious studies and gender studies. A 2014 Guggenheim Fellow, she has written several gender studies books on Indian culture. She worked as a professor at Emory University until 2021.

== Biography ==
Joyce Burkhalter Flueckiger was born to Ramoth Isabel (née Lowe) and Edward Burkhalter, who were both missionaries for the Mennonite Commission on Overseas Mission. Raised in India during her youth, she and her siblings studied at Woodstock School (class of 1970) in Landour, a hill station in the state of Uttarakhand. She obtained her BA in English at Goshen College and her PhD in South Asian Language and Literature at the University of Wisconsin-Madison; her doctoral dissertation Study of a Central Indian Folklore Region: Chhattisgarh was supervised by Velcheru Narayana Rao. After an unsuccessful search for Hindi language-related jobs, she was inspired to go into anthropology after doing research for what would become her book Amma's Healing Room more than a decade later. In 1992, she moved to Emory University, where she eventually became professor. She retired from Emory in August 2021 and was promoted to Professor Emerita of Religion.

Flueckiger's work specializes in the intersection of religious studies and gender studies. She has written several gender studies books on Indian culture (particularly Hinduism and Islam), particularly Gender and Genre in the Folklore of Middle India (1996), In Amma's Healing Room (2006), and When the World Becomes Female (2013). She was awarded a 2014 Guggenheim Fellowship in Religion, as well as a National Endowment for the Humanities, as part of her 2020 book Material Acts in Everyday Hindu Worlds. Additionally, she edited the volumes Oral Epics in India (1989) and Boundaries of the Text (1991) and wrote the textbook Everyday Hinduism (2015).

Flueckiger is married to Michael Flueckiger. Her brother-in-law Jonathan P. Larson is a memorist who wrote Making Friends Among the Taliban.

== Bibliography ==
- (ed. with Stuart H. Blackburn, Peter J. Claus, and Susan Snow Wadley) Oral Epics in India (1989)
- (ed. with Laurie J. Sears) Boundaries of the Text (1991)
- Gender and Genre in the Folklore of Middle India (1996)
- In Amma's Healing Room (2006)
- When the World Becomes Female (2013)
- Everyday Hinduism (2015)
