= Mantrapushpanjali =

Hindu prayer

Mantrapushpanjali (Sanskrit: मन्त्रपुष्पाञ्जलि, IAST: mantrapuṣpāñjali) is a Hindu prayer meaning "offering flowers in the form of mantra". It comprises four hymns from Vedic sources, and is the final prayer sung at the end of āratīs. The word Mantrapushpanjali is made up of three elements, mantra (incantation), pushpa (flower), and anjali (a bowl-shaped cavity formed by hollowing and joining open palms together, as when offering or receiving alms).

Mantrapushpanjali is an appendix of a set of traditional recital called Deve (Sanskrit: देवे) from Shukla Yajurveda branch of Vedic tradition. The hymns of Mantrapushpanjali are chanted at an extremely slow pace, elongating the deergha svarit (Sanskrit: दीर्घस्वरित) accents more than usual.

== Text ==
Devanagari

ॐ य॒ज्ञेन॑ य॒ज्ञम॑यजन्त दे॒वास्तानि॒ धर्मा॑णि प्रथ॒मान्या॑सन् ।
ते ह॒ नाकं॑ महि॒मान॑: सचन्त॒ यत्र॒ पूर्वे॑ सा॒ध्याः सन्ति॑ दे॒वाः ॥१॥

ॐ राजाधिराजाय प्रसह्यसाहिने नमो वयं वैश्रवणाय कुर्महे
स मे कामान्कामकामाय मह्यम् कामेश्वरो वैश्रवणो ददातु
कुबेराय वैश्रवणाय महाराजाय नमः ॥२॥

ॐ स्वस्ति
साम्राज्यं भौज्यं स्वाराज्यं वैराज्यं पारमेष्ठ्यं राज्यं
माहाराज्यमाधिपत्यमयं समंतपर्यायी स्यात्सार्वभौमः सार्वायुष आंतादापरार्धात्पृथिव्यै समुद्रपर्यंताया एकराळिति ॥३॥

तदप्येषः श्लोको ऽभिगीतो
मरुतः परिवेष्टारो मरुत्तस्यावसन् गृहे
आविक्षितस्य कामप्रेर्विश्वे देवाः सभासद इति ॥४॥

वि॒श्वत॑श्चक्षुरु॒त वि॒श्वतो॑मुखो वि॒श्वतो॑बाहुरु॒त वि॒श्वत॑स्पात् ।
सं बा॒हुभ्यां॒ धम॑ति॒ सं पत॑त्रै॒र्द्यावा॒भूमी॑ ज॒नय॑न्दे॒व एक॑: ॥ ५ ॥

IAST

1. om yajñena yajñamayajanta devāstāni dharmāṇi prathamānyāsan.
te ha nākam mahimānaḥ sacanta yatra pūrve sādhyāḥ santi devāḥ.

2. om rājādhirājāya prasahyasāhine namovayam vaiśravaṇāya kurmahe
sa me kāmānkāmakāmāya mahyam kāmeśvaro vaiśravaṇo dadātu
kuberāya vaiśravaṇāya mahārājāya namaḥ.

3. om svasti
sāmrājyam bhaujyam svārājyam vairājyam pārameṣṭhyam rājyam
māhārājyamādhipatyamayam samantaparyāyī syātsārvabhaumaḥ sārvāyuṣa āntādāparārdhātpṛthivyai samudraparyantāyā ekarāḷiti.

4. tadapyeṣa śloko 'bhigīto
marutaḥ pariveṣṭāro maruttasyāvasan gṛhe
āvikśitasya kāmaprerviśve devāḥ sabhāsada iti.

5. viśvataścakṣur uta viśvatomukho viśvatobāhur uta viśvataspāt.
sam bāhubhyāṁ dhamati sam patatrair dyāvābhūmī janayan deva ekaḥ.

Meaning

== Meaning ==
=== Verse 1 ===
By means of sacrifice the Gods accomplished their sacrifice: these were the earliest ordinances. These Mighty Ones attained the height of heaven, there where the Sādhyas, Gods of old, are dwelling.

Origin: Verse 1 (yajñena ... devāḥ) is from Ṛgveda, Mandala 1, Sūkta 164, Ṛc 50. This Verse also occurs in Ṛgveda, Mandala 10, Sūkta 90, Ṛc 16 and in Atharvaveda, Kāṇḍa 7, Sūkta 5, Mantra 1.

=== Verse 2 ===
We bow to Rājādhirāja Prasahyasāhī Vaiśravaṇa. May he, Kāmeshvara Vaiśravaṇa, grant me my desires for enjoyment of pleasures. [We] bow to Mahārāja Vaiśravaṇa Kubera.

Verse 2 honours Vaiśravaṇa Kubera, a Vedic deity. Vaiśravaṇa (descendant of Viśravas), Rājādhirāja (king of kings), Prasahyasāhī (victorious conqueror), Kāmeshvara (god of wishes or desires), and Mahārāja (a great king) are all epithets of Kubera.

Origin: Verse 2 (rājādhirājāya ... namaḥ) is from Taittiriya Aranyaka, Prapāṭhaka 1, Anuvāka 31, Mantra 6.

=== Verse 3 ===
... Universal sovereignty, enjoyment (of pleasures), independence, distinguished distinction as a king, the fulfilment of the highest desires, the position of a king, of a great king, and supreme mastership, that he might cross (with his arms) the universe, and become the ruler of the whole earth during all his life, which may last for an infinitely long time, that he might be the sole king of the earth up to its shores bordering on the ocean.

Verse 3 is a wish-list of a priest for his Kśattriya host of the Mahābhiśeka ("great inauguration") ceremony. Context for Verse 3 is provided by the portion [...] below from the translation by Haug.

[Fourth chapter (The Mahābhisheka ceremony performed on a King. What Rishis performed it, and for what Kings they performed it.) 15. (The consequences of Mahābhisheka. The oath which the King must take before the priest performs the ceremony.) The priest who, with this knowledge (about the Mahābhisheka ceremony) wishes that a Kshattriya should conquer in all the various ways of conquest, to subjugate all people, and that he should attain to leadership, precedence, and supremacy over all kings, and attain everywhere and at all times to ] universal sovereignty, enjoyment (of pleasures), independence, distinguished distinction as a king, the fulfilment of the highest desires, the position of a king, of a great king, and supreme mastership, that he might cross (with his arms) the universe, and become the ruler of the whole earth during all his life, which may last for an infinitely long time, that he might be the sole king of the earth up to its shores bordering on the ocean; [such a priest should inaugurate the Kshattriya with Indra's great inauguration ceremony. But before doing so, the priest must make the king take the following oath: "Whatever pious works thou mightest have done during the time which may elapse from the day of thy birth to the day of thy death, all together with thy position, thy good deeds, thy life, thy children, I would wrest from thee, shouldest thou do me any harm." The Kshattriya then who wishes to attain to all this, should well consider and say in good faith all that is above mentioned (thou mayest wrest from me, &c. &c.)]

Monier Williams provides different translations of some words. For example, Monier Williams translates bhuaujya as "the rank of a king with the title of bhoja", vairājya as "extended sovereignty", māhārajya as "the rank of a reigning prince or sovereign", pārameṣṭhya as "highest position, supremacy", samantaparyāyin as "all-embracing", and sārvāyuṣa as "possessing full vitality or vigour".

Origin: Verse 3 (sāmrājyam ... ekarāḷiti) is from Aitareya Brahmana, Pañcikā VIII, Khaṇḍa 15.

=== Verse 4 ===
Regarding this event there is the following Stotra chanted: "The Maruts resided as the distributors of food in the house of Marutta, the son of Avikshit, who had fulfilled all his desires; all the gods were present at the gathering.”

Verse 4 describes an episode about Marutta, a king inaugurated with the Mahabhiśeka ceremony, who went on to conquer the whole earth and performed the horse offering. Context for Verse 4 is provided by the portion [...] below from the translation by Haug.

[21. (What kings had the Mahābhisheka ceremony performed; their conquest of the whole earth, and the horse sacrifices. Stanzas on Janamejaya, Vishvakarma and Marutta.) … With this inauguration ceremony Samparta, the son of Angiras, inaugurated Marutta, son of Avikshit. Thence Marutta went conquering everywhere over the whole earth up to its ends, and offered the ceremonial horse.)] Regarding this event there is the following Stotra chanted: “The Maruts resided as the distributors of food in the house of Marutta, the son of Avikshit, who had fulfilled all his desires; all the gods were present at the gathering.”

Monier Williams translates Āvikśita as a descendant of Avikśit, and Kāmapri as son of Kāmapra, name of Marutta. Monier Williams also translates viśve devāḥ as "all the gods collectively" or the "All-gods" (a particular class of gods, plural of viśva deva, forming one of the nine gaṇas enumerated under gaṇadevatā).

Origin: Verse 4 (tadapyeṣa ... iti) is also from Aitareya Brahmana, Pañcikā VIII, Khaṇḍa 21.

The auspicious salutations ॐ (om) and ॐ स्वस्ति (om svasti) are later additions to the original Vedic text.

=== Verse 5 ===
Verse 5 is often skipped in currently prevalent recitals of Mantra Pushpanjali performed after Arati. But the original scriptures of Deve have this chanted in a slow rhythm. The mantra comes originally from Rigveda (10.081.003). It describes the only ultimate supreme truth (एकःदेवः) that created and encapsulates the entire universe and how with its metaphorical strong arms and legs manages the lifecycle of celestial bodies such as stars and earth.

== Recitation ==
After everyday worship (puja) or special puja like Satyanarayana, Lord Ganesh Sthapana, etc Mantrapushpanjali is sung after the āratīs (to Ganesh, Shankar, Durga, and other deities). Unlike the āratis and the bhajan, Mantrapushpanjali is not accompanied by clapping or by hand cymbals. Mantrapushpanjali is enunciated reverentially by devotees holding flower(s) in their palms. After the recitation, the flowers are offered to the deity.

== See also ==
- Āratī
- Ganesh festival
