= Mamaidev =

11th century Sindhi saint

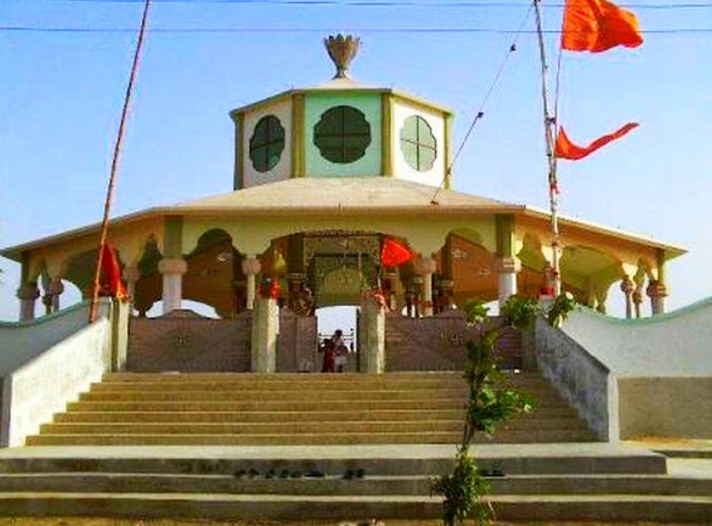
Tomb of Mamaidev located at Makli, Pakistan

Mamai Dev (also known as Mamai Pandit and Guru Mam) was a religious teacher or guru of Maheshwari Meghawal Samaj and Raajguru of Jadeja Dynasty. He was born in India in the 11th - 12th century. He is considered to be an incarnation of Lord Brahma and his religious identity described as "Pandh Mamai, Jeev Varma Jo Karam Ameyarakh" means his body name is Mamai and his soul is Brahma in the religious texts of Baarmati religion of Maheshwari Samaj. He preached religion to the Meghwar community of Saurashtra, Kutch of Gujarat and Sindh, in present day Pakistan. He also preached to the poor Sinbhariya Meghwar for Dharma. He described and formulated ancient Barmati Panth. His tomb is located in the Thatta District in the Sindh province of Pakistan.

Mamai Dev lived during the reigns of the Jadeja Samma rulers of Kutch and the Samma rulers of Thatta. He composed numerous Barmati Gitanans in Sindhi, Kutch, and Halari languages; these sacred verses are known as Mamai Dev jo Ginan. He died in Thatta, where a shrine named Mamai Dev Astan was later built in his honor. Each year, devotees make a pilgrimage to this shrine to commemorate his death.

Mamai Dev is regarded as the first and earliest writer of Kutchi literature. He is the fourth Guru of the Barmati Panth. Mamai Dev can also be considered the first scholar of Matang Dev and the Barmati Panth, because it is through his compositions and teachings that we gain important knowledge about Matang Dev and the Barmati Panth today.
