= Arti (Hinduism) =

Hindu ritual of light-waving

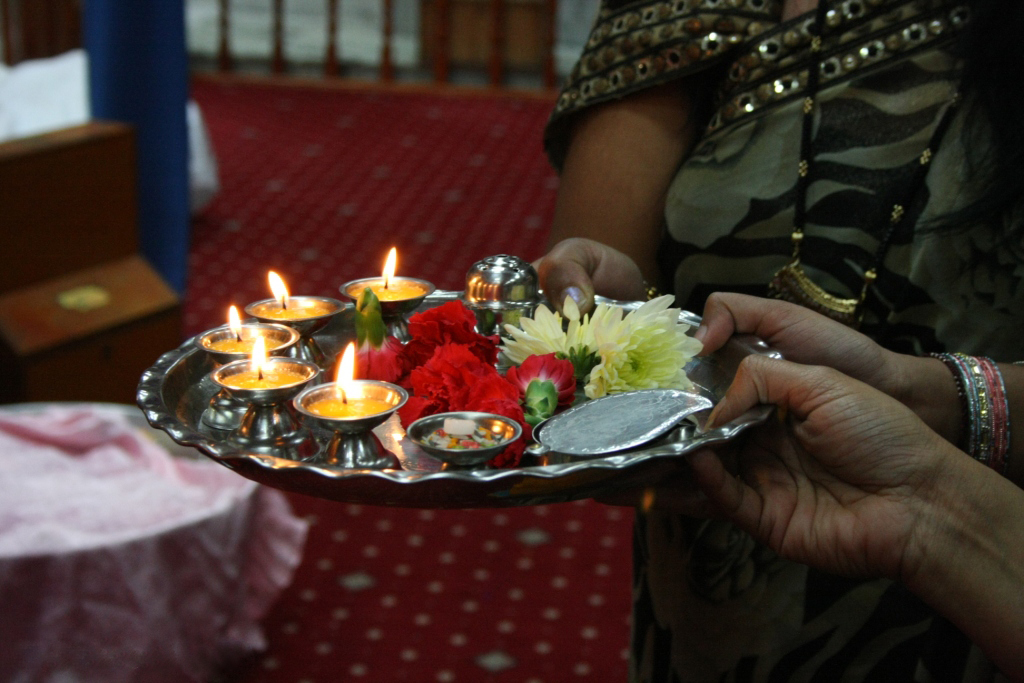
Arti plate

Arti (Note: Hindi: आरती, romanized: Āratī) or Arartikya (Note: Sanskrit: आरार्तिक्य, romanized: Ārārtikya) is a Hindu ritual employed in worship, part of a puja, in which light from a flame (fuelled by camphor, ghee, or oil) is ritually waved in a clock-wise motion to venerate deities. Arti also refers to the hymns sung in praise of the deity, when the light is being offered. Sikhs have Arti kirtan which involves only devotional singing; the Nihang order of Sikhs also use light for arti.

== Etymology and origin ==
Arti is thought to have descended from Vedic fire rituals, or yajna. The word arti derives from the Sanskrit आरात्रिक (ārātrika), meaning "that which removes rātrī", or darkness. A Marathi language reference notes it is also known as Mahānīrāñjanā (Sanskrit: महानीराञ्जना). The term can also be understood as "before night," symbolizing the devotee's passage out of a material state of being into the light of God, a devotion where the darkness of "night" cannot touch them.

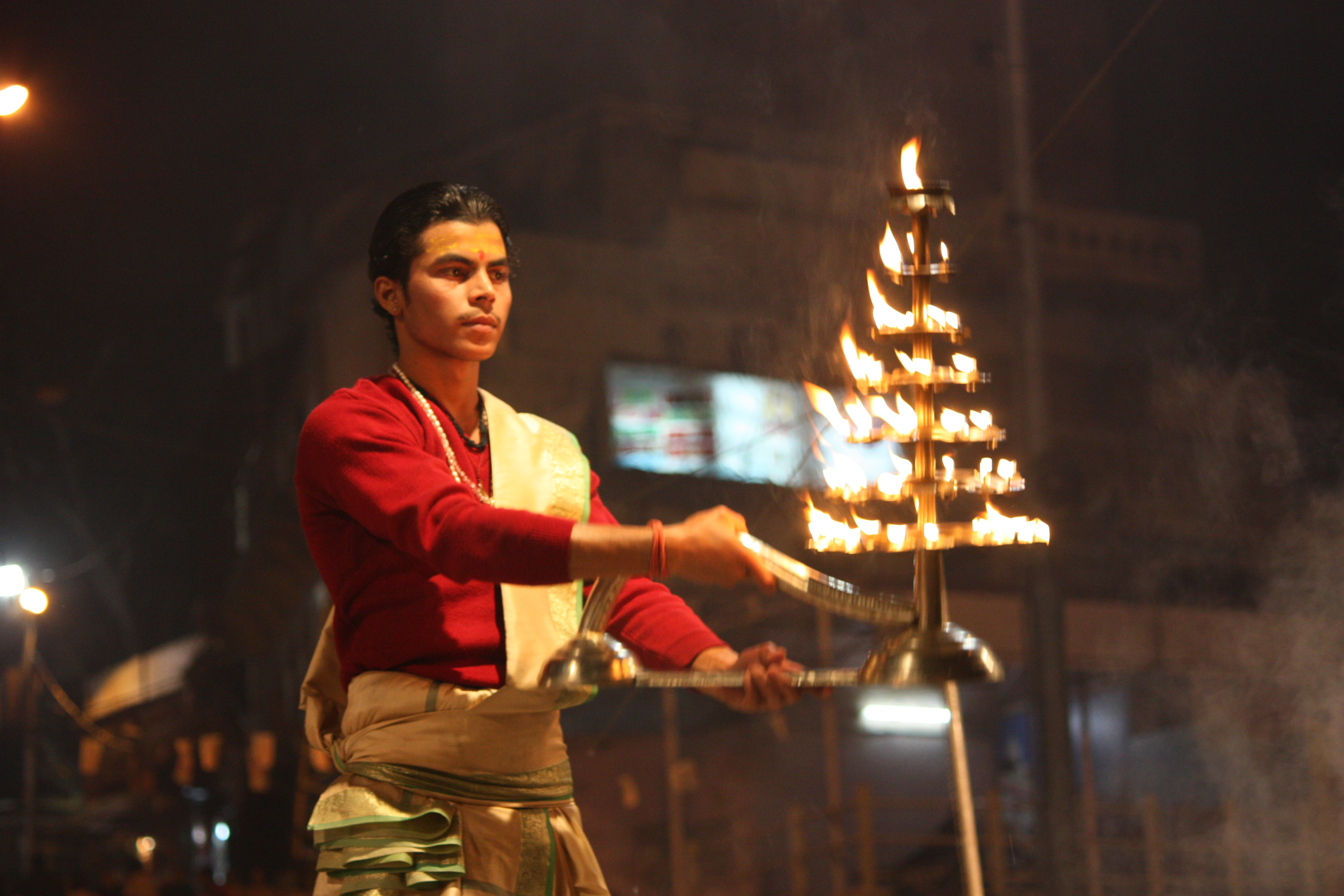
Arti performed in Rishikesh

== Practice ==
Arti ranges from simple acts of worship to extravagant rituals, but almost always includes a jyoti (flame or light). It is performed up to eight times daily, depending on the specific Hindu tradition and temple. It is performed as part of most Hindu liturgies and occasions and typically involves circling a diya (lamp) clockwise before a murti (sacred image) of a deity, accompanied by hymns. After the lamp has been waved before the deity, it is brought to the devotee, who then briefly places both their palms above the sanctified flame to receive its warmth. It is believed that the flame has acquired the power and grace of the deity. The devotee then raises their hands in supplication, bringing both palms toward to their forehead and touching their eyes in a gesture of self-purification and connection with the Divine.

The diya (lamp) used for arti is most often made of brass or other materials, and holds a cotton wick soaked in camphor, ghee, or oil. The arti plate may contain other offerings like flowers, incense, and akshata (rice).

== Significance ==
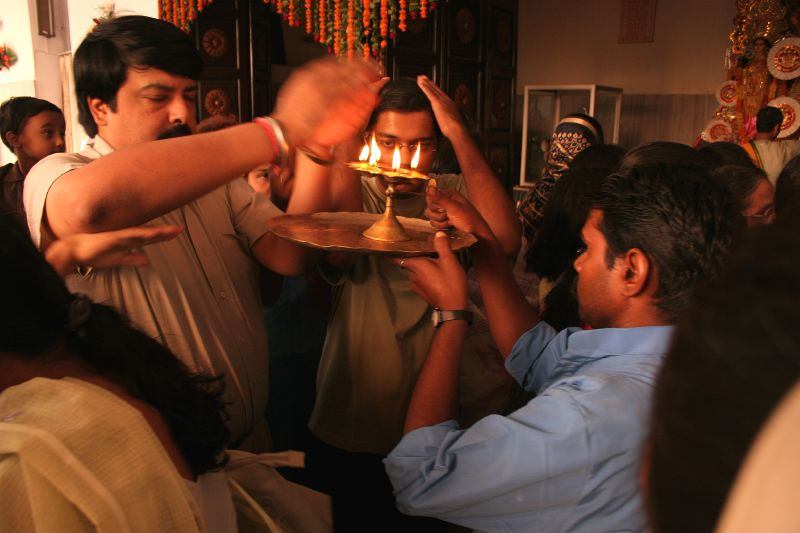
Taking arti blessing during a Durga puja celebration.

Arti is an expression of many aspects including love, benevolence, gratitude, prayer, or desire depending on the reason it is performed. For example, it can be a form of respect when performed for elders, prayers when performed to deities, or hope when performed within the home. Emotions and prayers are often silent while performing arti, but this is determined by the person carrying out the ritual or the holiday involved. It is also believed that blessings can be taken through symbolic hand movements over the flame.

Arti also represents one's self—thus, arti signifies that one is peripheral to godhead or divinity.

Another understanding of the arti ritual is that it serves as a reminder to stay vigilant so that the forces of material pleasures and desires cannot overcome the individual. Just as the lighted wick provides light and chases away darkness, the vigilance of an individual can keep away the influence of the material world.

The purpose of arti is to wave light before the deity in a spirit of humility and gratitude, wherein the faithful become immersed in a God's divine form. The five elements are represented by all accoutrements used for arti:

1. Akasha(ether) - yak-tail fan represents ether and space
2. Vayu(wind) - peacock fan represents the movement of air
3. Agni(fire) - lamp or candle represents the heat of fire
4. Jalam(water) - water and handkerchief represent the liquidity of water
5. Prithvi(earth) - flowers represent the solidity of the Earth

The first thing that the devotee offers is their heart and then any other accoutrements. The devotee may offer incense as well. The burning of the incense represents the purifying of the mind and so the offering of incense can be a symbolic gesture meant to represent the offering of a purified mind. Having to remember the timings, order of offerings, and other parts of the ritual exercise the intelligence of the devotee and so through the arti ritual one's intelligence is also offered to the deity. Through all these different offerings one's "entire existence" is surrendered to God through the arti ceremony.

== Types of arti ==
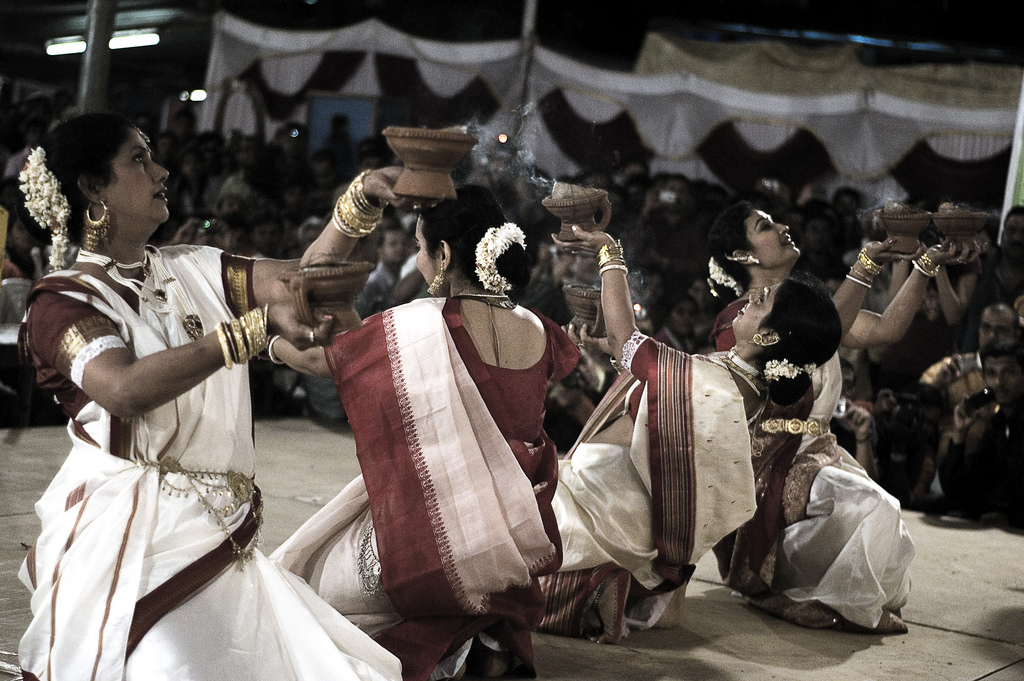
Arti dance in Bangalore, 2009.

Hinduism has a long tradition of songs sung as an accompaniment to the ritual of arti. It primarily extols the virtues of the deity that the ritual is being offered to, and several sects have their own versions of the common arti songs that are often sung on chorus at various temples, during evening and morning artis. Sometimes they also contain snippets of information on the life of the deity.

The most commonly sung arti is that which is dedicated to all deities called Om Jai Jagdish Hare, known as "the universal arti". Other arti's are used for other deities as well such as Om Jai Shiv omkara, Om Jai Lakshmi mata, Om Jai Ambe gauri, Om Jai Adya Shakti, Om Jai Saraswati Mata, Om Jai Gange Mata, Om Jai Tulsi Mata and Om Jai Surya Bhagvaan. In Ganesha worship, the arti "Sukhakarta Dukhaharta" is popular in Maharashtra.

In Swaminarayan Mandirs, Jay Sadguru Swami is the arti that is sung. In most temples in India, arti is performed at least twice a day, after the ceremonial puja, which is the time when the largest number of devotees congregates.

In Pushtimarg Havelis, arti is performed by a sole mukhiyaji (priest) while "Haveli Sangit" (kirtan) is being sung. Devotees only watch the arti being done and do not get to take a major part in it. During bhajan or utsavs (festivals) celebrated at home, "Jai Jai Shree Yamuna" is sung while devotees perform arti. It is said that Sandhya arti is done to see if Lord Shrinathji had gotten hurt while playing outside because it is performed after sundown.

== Durga puja ==
During the Bengali festival Durga puja ritual drummers – dhakis, carrying large leather-strung dhak's, show off their skills during ritual dance worships called arti or Dhunuchi dance.

== Across other traditions ==
=== Arti within Sikhism ===
In Sikhism, Gagan mai thaal is a type of arti recited by first guru, Guru Nanak in either 1506 or 1508 at Jagannath Temple, Puri, during his Udaasi (journey) to the east of the Indian subcontinent. Amritsar Sikhs sing Arti kirtan, which comprise a few shabads from Guru Nanak, Ravidas and other Bhagats and Gurus. According to them, it is the arti of divine wisdom in the form of the Guru Granth Sahib – Sikhism's eternal Guru and chief scripture. It is considered the equivalent of bowing on one's knees before the Guru Granth Sahib. This arti does not employ ritual items, but is instead sung after the daily recitation of the Rehraas Sahib and Ardās at Harmandir Sahib in Amritsar, and most Gurdwaras worldwide.

An exception is the Nihang order, whose members first recite Aarta (prayers derived from banis in the Dasam Granth and Sarbloh Granth – scriptures of secondary and tertiary importance in the faith), and as in Hindu practise, employ diya, flowers, conch shells, bells, incense during the ritual. This form of Sikh arti is also recited at Patna Sahib and Hazur Sahib.

=== Arti within Jainism ===
The practice of waving lamps is similarly integrated into the Jain tradition. Within the Jain tradition, the dipak is waved in a temple in the morning and at night. The arti if offered at the end of all pujas. Small amounts of sandalwood mixed with water, milk, and more water are offered on a plate after which the devotee recites the names of the 24 Tirthakaras and the namaskara mantra. The arti happens at the very end.

== See also ==
- Arti (given name)
- Blessing
- Jay Sadguru Swami
- Mantrapushpanjali
- Om Jai Jagdish Hare
- Shankha
