= Kundrodi =

- village
- Location in Gujarat, India Kundrodi (India)
- Coordinates: 22°58′0″N 69°47′49″E
- Country: India
- State: Gujarat
- District: Kutch (Kachchh)
- Taluka: Mundra

Government
  - Body: Gram Panchayat

Population (2011)
  - Total: 986

Languages
  - local: Kutchi, Gujarati, Hindi
- Time zone: UTC+5:30 (IST)
- PIN: 370410
- Nearest city: Gandhidham

Kundrodi is a small village in Mundra Taluka in Kachchh District of Gujarat, India, and is located between Anjar and Mundra. It is around 40 km from Gandhidham and around 60 km from Bhuj. The postal code is 370410. Kundrodi is surrounded by Mandvi Taluka towards west, Anjar Taluka towards North, Adipur Taluka towards East and Bhuj Taluka towards North. Kundrodi is 10 – 15 km from Mundra port.

== Demographics ==
As of the 2011 census there are 229 households with a total population of 986. Gujarati is the local language, but, most people speak Kutchi.

== Places of worship ==
Though Kundrodi is very small village, it houses a temple of Momai.

Kundrodi also has many other temples which are maintained and attended by locals.
