= Thakur Singh Sandhawalia =

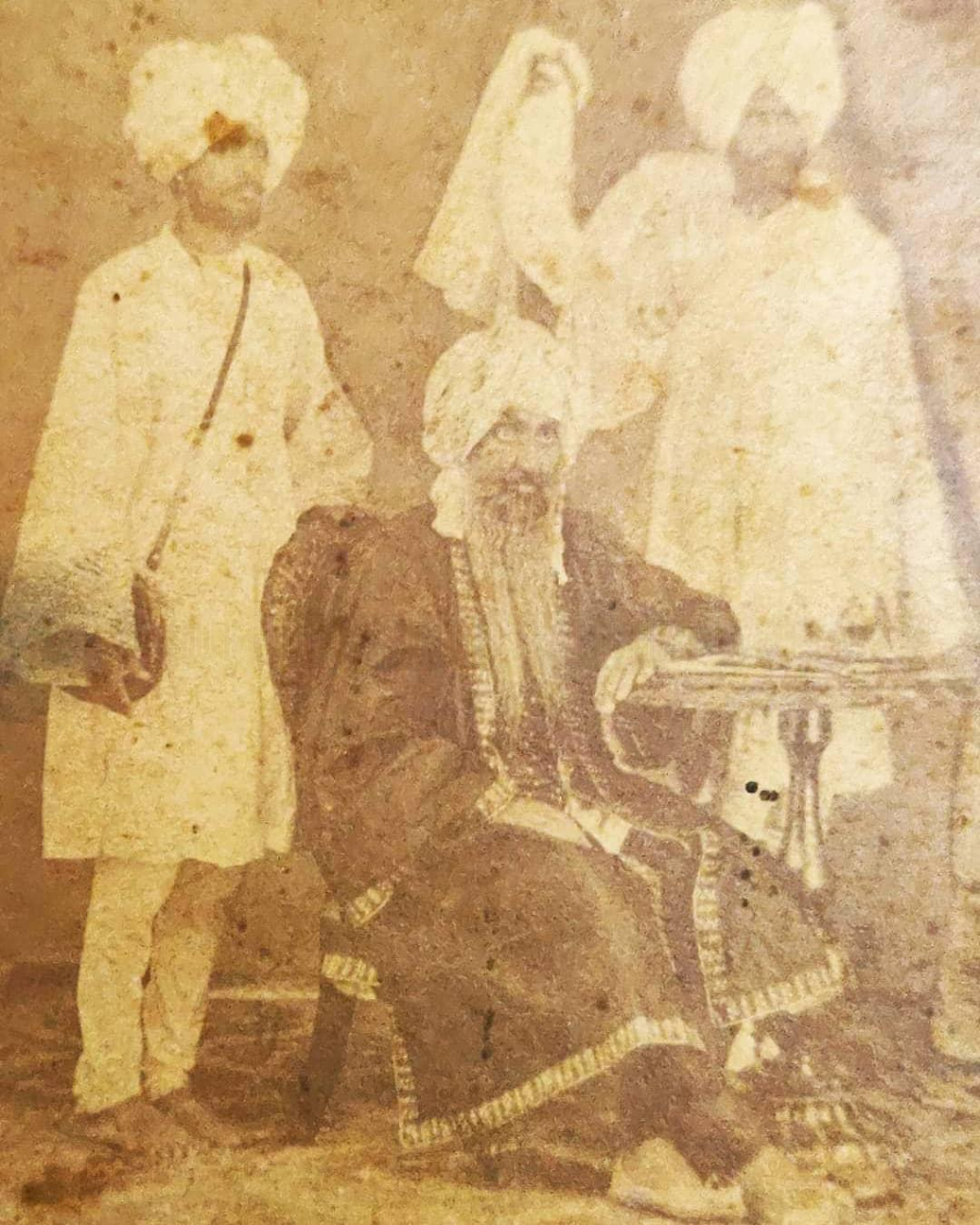
Photograph of Thakur Singh Sandhawalia (seated) with two attendants

Thakur Singh Sandhawalia (1837–1887) was a Sikh leader and reformer. He was a co-founder of the Singh Sabha movement, alongside Bhai Gurmukh Singh. Thakur Singh belonged to the Sandhawalia family and was the son of Lehna Singh Sandhawalia. As a cousin of Duleep Singh, he is credited with re-converting Duleep Singh to Sikhism and he tried in vain to re-install Duleep Singh as maharaja of Punjab. He had been in communication with Duleep Singh since 1870, informing him about the confiscated property of the former Sikh Empire and that Duleep Singh was prophesized to return to power and become the eleventh guru of the Sikhs. Thakur Singh became the prime minister or chief minister of a Sikh government in-exile.
