= Khalsa Akhbar =

Weekly newspaper published from Lahore

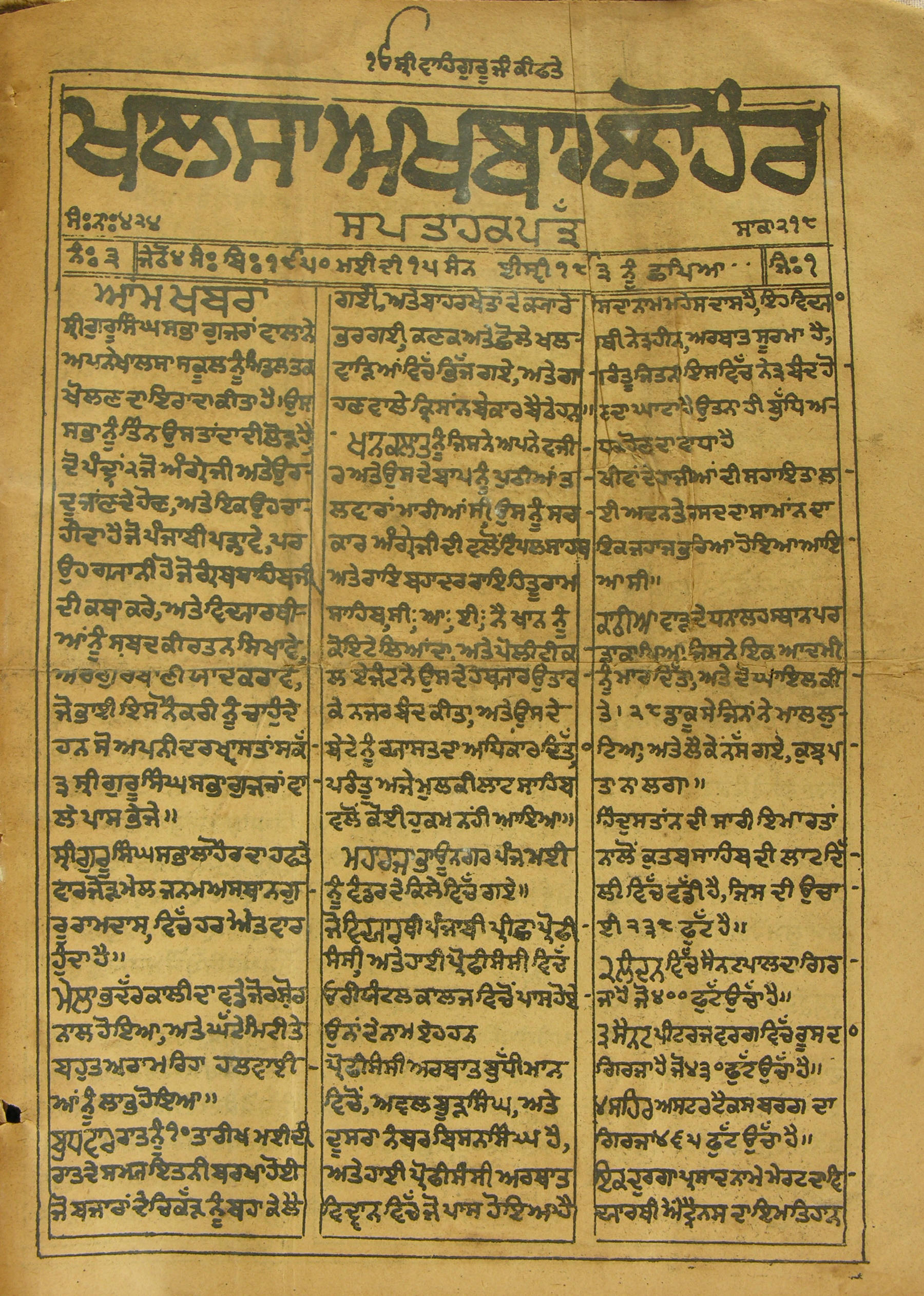
- Khalsa Akhbar Lahore, 15 May 1893. Digitized by Panjab Digital Library.
- Type: Weekly newspaper
- Owner: Giani Ditt Singh
- Founder: Gurmukh Singh
- Publisher: Lahore Khalsa Diwan
- Editor: Jhanda Singh; Basant Singh; Maeeya Singh Ahluwalia
- Founded: 1883 or 13 June 1886
- Ceased publication: 1889 (temporary); 1905 (permanent)
- Relaunched: 1 May 1893

The Khalsa Akhbar (Punjabi: ਖ਼ਾਲਸਾ ਅਖ਼ਬਾਰ (Gurmukhi), خالصہ اخبار (Shahmukhi)), Lahore, was a weekly newspaper and the organ of the Lahore Khalsa Diwan, a Sikh society. Published from Lahore in the Punjabi language (Gurmukhi script), the newspaper was established in 1886 and functioned sporadically till 1905. Founded by Bhai Gurmukh Singh, a professor of Punjabi at the Oriental College, Lahore, who also established the Khalsa Press in Lahore, the paper was taken over by Giani Ditt Singh, a scholar and a poet. It was one of the most prominent and influential Sikh periodicals prior to 1920.

== History ==
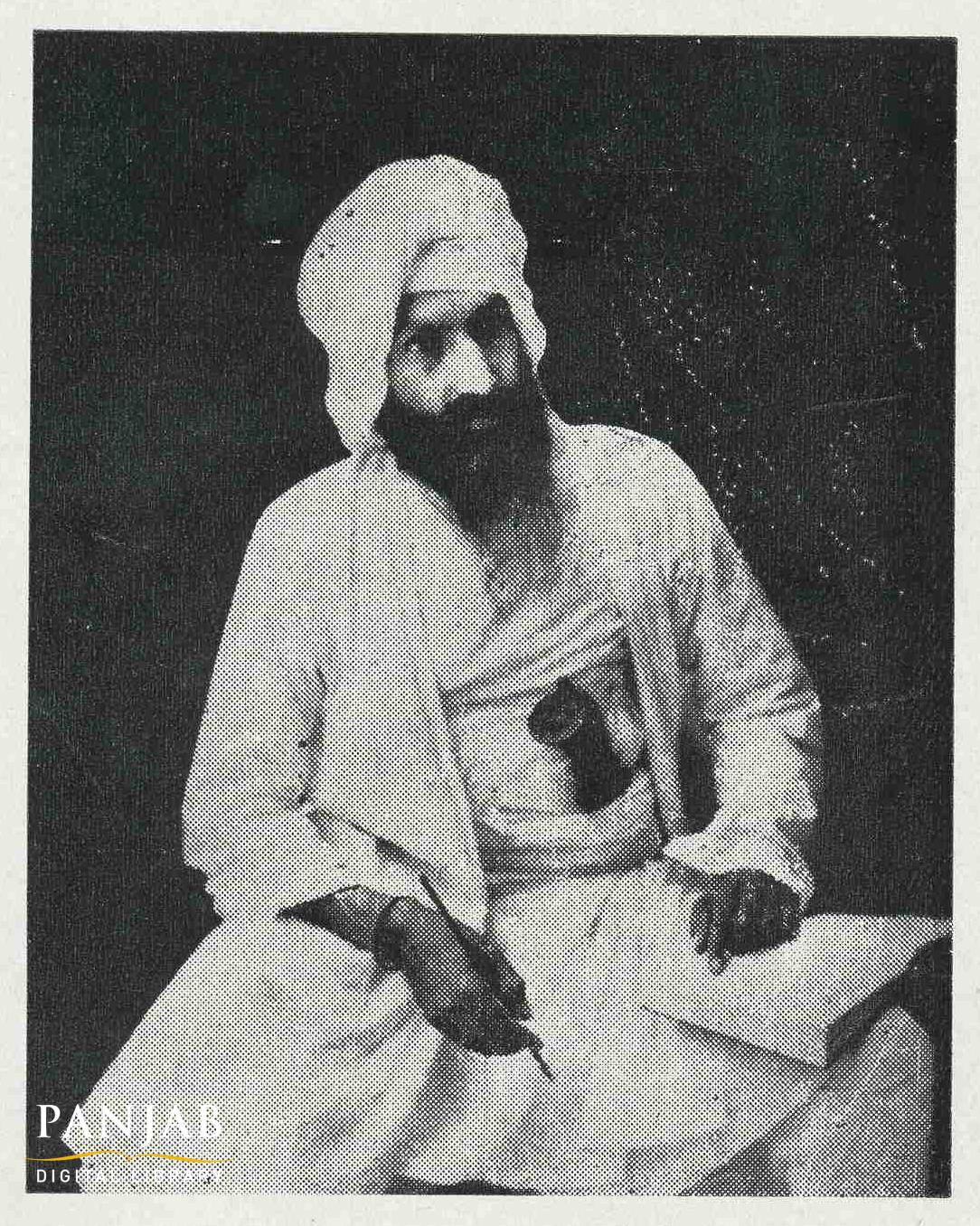
Photograph of Prof. Gurmukh Singh (1849–1898). He was a professor of Punjabi at Oriental College Lahore, and was the founder of the Khalsa Akhbar Lahore. He also was one of the founders of Singh Sabha Lehar (Singh Sabha movement).

The newspaper was published with effect from 13 June 1886 through the efforts of Bhai Gurmukh Singh from Lahore. However, Norman G. Barrier claims the paper was established in 1883. The newspaper was founded through the joint-efforts of Gurmukh Singh, Jhanda Singh, and Ditt Singh, after the three had established the Khalsa Press in 1883. Maharaja Hira Singh of Nabha State aided with the establishment of the Khalsa Press.

It was a weekly newspaper of the Khalsa Diwan society being published in lithography and in Gurmukhi script. Its first two editors were Giani Jhanda Singh Faridkot and Sardar Basant Singh. Another editor who worked on the paper was Mayya Singh. Later on, it was handed over to Giani Ditt Singh. The newspaper became a champion of the reformist elements of the contemporary Sikh society.

In the 1 January 1887 new-year issue of the newspaper, it stated the following regarding the management situation of the Golden Temple in Amritsar, being one of the earliest precursory voices of the Gurdwara Reform movement:

We appeal before the Khalsa community and the Government ... that the present committee for the management of the Golden Temple is neither based on the principles of the Khalsa Panth nor on Government legislation ... The administration is not supposed to interfere in religious matters.

— Khalsa Akhbar, 1 January 1887 issue

The newspaper continued to be published until 1889. After this, its publication stopped for sometime due to a legal libel suit filed by the Amritsari party regarding the publication of a play called Swapan.

It resumed publication again on 1 May 1893 with Giani Ditt Singh as its editor. An experienced scholar and an expert in debates and discussions, he entered into many heated debates with representatives of Arya Samaj. The revived paper had around 1,000 subscribers.

Giani Ditt Singh was an excellent writer of Punjabi prose and poetry and wrote many of his editorials in verse. He was the right-hand man of Bhai Gurmukh Singh and one of the pillars of Singh Sabha Lahore. He died in 1901. After him, Sardar Maeeya Singh Ahluwalia became the editor of Khalsa Akhbar and continued until 1905. The newspaper ceased publication in 1905 after the dissolution of Singh Sabha Lahore and due to some other reasons.
