= Ditt Singh =

Sikh reformer

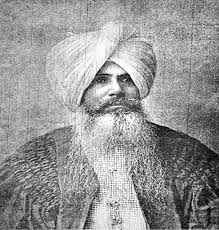
Portrait of Giani Ditt Singh

Giani Ditt Singh (c. 1850–1901) was a historian, scholar, poet, editor and an eminent Singh Sabha reformer. Singh wrote over 70 books on Sikhism, the most famous of which is Khalsa Akhbar. His Sadhu Dayanand Te Mera Samvad and Durga Parbodh are considered major texts of Sikh philosophy.

== Early life ==
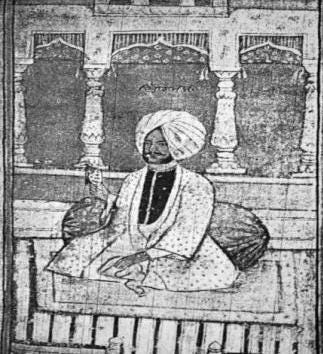
Giani Ditt Singh at age 21

There is little information regarding the early life of Singh, despite a resurgence of interest in him caused by the desire of some people to recast his life as that of a Chamar hero. Anshu Malhotra has argued that such a recasting says more about the motives of the present-day researchers than it does about the effects of social status on Singh himself.

While Singh's date of birth is generally recognised as being 21 April, the year is variously stated as 1850, 1852 and 1853. His father, Diwan Singh's knowledge of the Nyaya and Vedanta religious philosophies was passed on to his son. The family origins lay in the Chamar caste, from which they had moved to self-identify as members of the relatively ritually clean Ravidasia weaving community, described by Malhotra as an "upwardly mobile section of the Chamar community".

After initial schooling given by his father, Singh was sent at the age of 8 or 9 to be taught by Gurbakhsh Singh and Lala Dayanand in the village of Tiur, Ambala district. There he studied Gurmukhi, Urdu and Persian, as well as prosody, Niti Shastra and Vedanta, until aged around 16. Gurbakhsh Singh was an adherent of the Gulabdasi sect and his pupil's next move was to the Gulabdasi centre at Chathian Wala, near Lahore.

Formally initiated into the sect of Sant Desa Singh, he became a Gulabdasi preacher. Not long afterwards, he came under the influence of Bhai Jawahar Singh, formerly a follower of Gulabdasi sect, who had joined the Arya Samaj.

== Early reform activities ==
Soon, Singh was drawn into the Sikh fold through Bhai Gurmukh Singh, then an active figure in the Singh Sabha Movement. In 1886, he became a principal contributor to and subsequently the second editor of the weekly Khalsa Akhbar Lahore, a newspaper founded by Bhai Gurmukh Singh following the establishment of the Lahore Khalsa Diwan.

Singh had passed the Gyani examination the same year and was appointed a teacher at the Oriental College. He used the Khalsa Akhbar as a vehicle for the spread of Singh Sabha ideas.

When the Amritsar Khalsa Diwan excommunicated Bhai Gurmukh Singh, Ditt Singh responded by publishing excerpts from his book Svapan Natak, a thinly veiled satire ridiculing the Amritsar leaders, in the Khalsa Akhbar. This resulted in a lawsuit filed by one of the targets of the satire, which, although eventually dismissed, cost the Khalsa Akhbar dearly in time and money to defend. The paper shut down in 1889. With support from the Maharaja of Nahba, the paper resumed publication in 1893, again under Ditt Singh as editor. This led to the eventual launch of an English-language weekly, titled simply Khalsa.

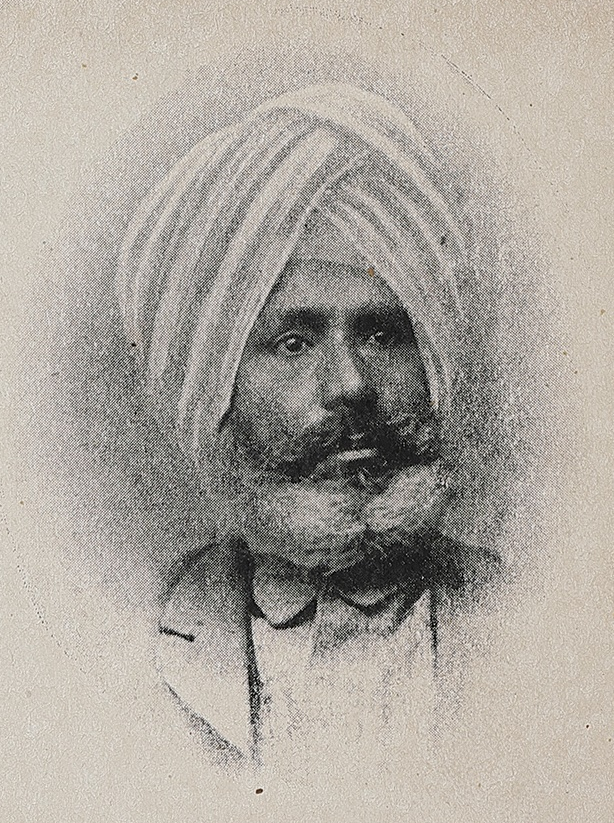
Portrait of Bhai Ditt Singh Giani, detail from the frontispiece of 'The Sikh Religion' (1909), by Lal Singh Musawir

Through all of his Sikh Sabha activities, Singh had maintained his ties to the Arya Samaj, but in 1888, the increasing discord between the Arya Samaj and Sikh leaders led to Singh's ultimate departure from the movement. After this, he threw himself entirely into the work of the Singh Sabha.

As an educator, Singh helped in the setting up of Khalsa College, Amritsar, and wrote textbooks for the students of the college.

== Discussion with Swami Dayanand ==
Swami Dayanand was the founder of the Arya Samaj movement, but Singh found Dayanand's belief in the supremacy of the Vedas and the role of Hinduism as the sole true religion at odds with the multi-cultural and multi-religious world of the time. Singh planned to set things right. During a religious gathering in 1877 at Lahore, Singh visited Dayanand "to know his mind and to know his ideals." Singh published these dialogues in his book Sadhu Daya Nand Naal Mera Sambad. During the course of the discussion, Singh takes issue with Dayanand's beliefs, and attempts to expose the fallacies therein. Malhotra describes the discussions with Dayanand as "putative" and the booklet as "controversial".

== Literary career ==
Singh wrote prolifically, producing both prose and verse. He wrote books and pamphlets on Sikh theology and history and on current polemics.

Well-known among his works are:

- Guru Nanak Prabodh
- Guru Arjan Chariltar
- Dambh Bidaran
- Durga Prabodh
- Panth Prabodh
- Raj Prabodh
- Sadhu Dayanand Te Mera Samvad
- Naqh Siah Prabodh
- Panth Sudhar Binai Pattar
- Abla Naari

He also published accounts of the martyrdoms of Tara Singh of Van, Subeg Singh, Matab Singh Mirankotia, Taru Singh and Bota Singh.

== Personal life ==
Singh's married Bishan Kaur in a Sikh rite in Lahore in 1880. They had two children: a son, Baldev Singh, born in 1886, and a daughter, Vidyavant Kaur, born in 1890.

== Death ==
The death of Singh's daughter on 17 June 1901 was a great blow to Singh, who was already suffering exhaustion from his workload as leader of the Singh Sabha. He continued to work, but his health deteriorated rapidly and he fell seriously ill. Singh died at Lahore on 6 September 1901.

== Memorials ==
After Singh's death, Bhai Vir Singh wrote a poem in his honor that was published in the Khalsa Akhbar. In addition, the Giani Ditt Singh Memorial International Society works to keep Singh's memory alive.
