= Singh Sabha movement =

Sikh movement in Punjab from the 1870s onwards

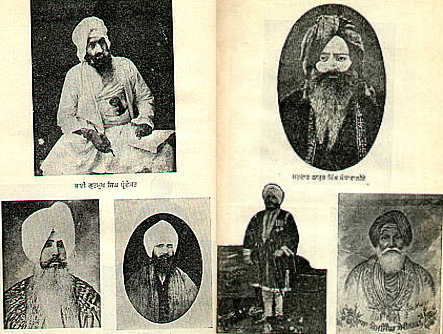
Prominent figures of the Singh Sabha movement. Their names, starting top-left and going clockwise, are as follows: Bhai Gurmukh Singh (1849–1898), Thakur Singh Sandhawalia (1837–1887), Khem Singh Bedi (1832–1905), Kanwar Bikram Singh (1835–1887), Jawaher Singh Kapur (1859–1910), and Giani Ditt Singh (1853–1901).

The Singh Sabhā movement, also known as the Singh Sabhā Lehar, was a Sikh movement that began in Punjab in the 1870s in reaction to the proselytising activities of Christians, Hindu reform movements (Brahmo Samaj, Arya Samaj) and Muslims (Aligarh Movement and Ahmadiyah). The movement was founded in an era when the Sikh Empire had been dissolved and annexed by the British, the Khalsa had lost its prestige, and mainstream Sikhs were rapidly converting to other religions. The movement's aims were to "propagate the true Sikh religion and restore Sikhism to its pristine glory; to write and distribute historical and religious books of Sikhs; and to propagate Gurmukhi Punjabi through magazines and media." The movement sought to reform Sikhism and bring back into the Sikh fold the apostates who had converted to other religions; as well as to interest the influential British officials in furthering the Sikh community. At the time of its founding, the Singh Sabha policy was to avoid criticism of other religions and political matters.

Singh Sabha was successful in almost doubling the Sikh population by bringing new converts into Sikh fold. Between 1901 and 1941, many Jats, OBC's, and Dalits converted to Sikhism due to outreach and preaching efforts of Singh Sabha movement. The movement was allied with the Theosophical Society. The movement led to the development of Modern Standard Punjabi as a standardized form of Punjabi.

== Background ==
=== Khalsa period ===
Increased Mughal persecution of the Sikhs in the eighteenth century forced the Khalsa, which had raised arms against the state, to yield gurdwara control to mahants, or custodians, who often belonged to Udasi, Nirmala, or other Brahmanical-influenced ascetic heterodox sects, or were non-Sikh altogether due to their lack of external identification, as opposed to initiated Sikhs. The Khalsa at this time engaged in guerilla campaigns against the Mughals and the rajas of the Sivalik Hills allied to them; having vacated the Punjab plains, they launched attacks from the refuges of the northern hilly areas adjoining Punjab, and the desert areas to the south. They later fought the Afghans and established themselves as local leaders.

Meanwhile, mahant control of gurdwaras continued into the nineteenth century, particularly a pujari priestly class under the patronage of the Sikh elites and aristocracy. This new Jatt Sikh nobility would begin to imitate Rajput kings, the customary embodiment of royal prestige of the region, following them in the process of Sanskritisation, and taking on their customs and religious beliefs, including astrology, Brahmin patronage, cow veneration, and sati, alongside their own.

The religious functionaries allied with such groups would write exegeses, while the Khalsa focused on political power at the time, as Sikh jatthas solidified into the Sikh misls of the Dal Khalsa. The Dal Khalsa would establish the Sikh Empire, which, in the midst of reaching new levels of political power in the face of Mughal and Afghan attacks, came at the expense of reestablishing direct control over Sikh institutions and the eroding of Sikh mores, a development that Khalsa would have to contend with when the Sikh Empire was lost to the British.

=== British annexation ===
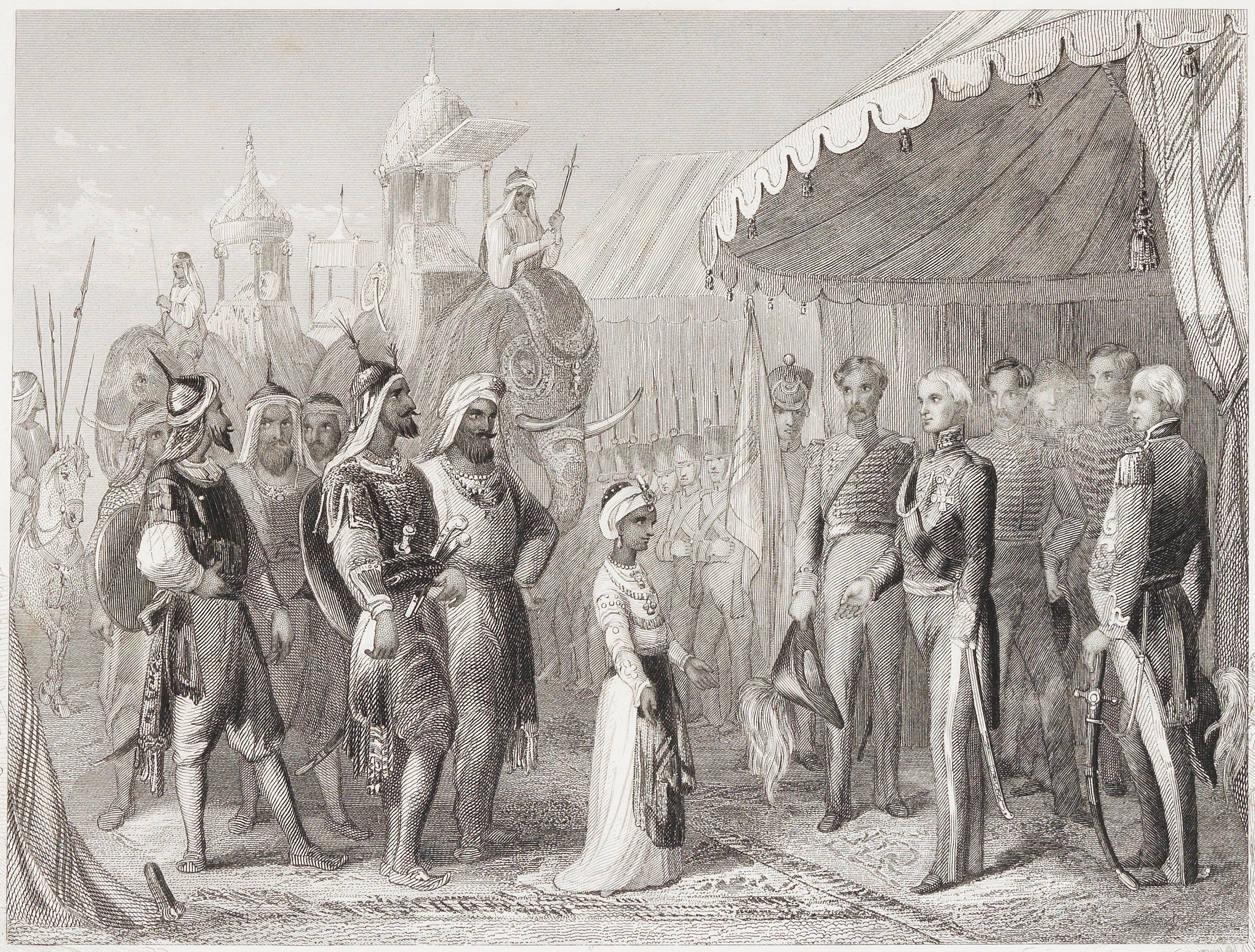
The surrender of Maharajah Duleep Singh to Sir Henry Hardinge, February 1846. Drawn by Hablot K. Browne, engraved by Browne and R. Young, circa 1846.

The British East India Company annexed the Sikh Empire in 1849 after the Second Anglo-Sikh War, ending the central Sikh government founded by Ranjit Singh in 1799 and replacing the existing ruling class. Thereafter, Christian missionaries increased proselytising activities in central Punjab. In 1853, Maharajah Dalip Singh, the last Sikh ruler, was controversially converted to Christianity. The British colonial rulers, after annexing the Sikh empire in mid-19th-century, continued to patronise and gift land grants to these mahants, thereby increasing their strength and helped sustain the idolatry in Sikh shrines.

The annexation of the Punjab to the British Empire in the mid-19th century saw severe deterioration of gurdwara management. Recognising the centrality of religion among the Sikhs, the British particularly took care to control central Sikh institutions, notably those at Amritsar and Tarn Taran, where British officers headed management committees, appointed key officials, and provided grants and facilities. They sought to cosset and control the Sikhs through the management of the Golden Temple and its functionaries, even ignoring its own dictates of statutory law which required the separation of political and religious matters, neutrality in the treatment of religious communities. and the withdrawal from involvement in religious institutions. The need to control the Golden Temple was held to be more paramount, and along with control of Sikh institutions, measures included the legal ban of carrying weapons, meant to disarm the Khalsa who had fought against them in the two Anglo-Sikh Wars.

In this way the Khalsa army was disbanded and the Punjab demilitarised, and Sikh armies were required to publicly surrender their arms and return to agriculture or other pursuits. Certain groups, however, like those who held revenue-free lands (jagirdars) were allowed to decline, particularly if they were seen as “rebels”. The British were wary of giving the Sikhs unmitigated control of their own gurdwaras, and drew from Sikh factions seen as loyal to the British, like the Sikh aristocracy and Sikhs with noted family lineages, who were given patronage and pensions, and Udasis, who had gained control of historical gurdwaras in the eighteenth and early nineteenth centuries, were allowed to retain proprietary control over lands and buildings.

The British administration went to considerable lengths to insert such loyalists into the Golden Temple in order to exert as much control over the Sikh body-politic as possible. One reason for this was the growth of Sikh revivalist groups, like the Nirankaris and the Namdharis, shortly after annexation; this revivalism was spurred by a growing disaffection within the ranks of ordinary Sikhs about the perceived decline of proper Sikh practices.

==== Community concerns ====
Parallel to the end of Sikh sovereignty in Punjab and the gradual appropriation of Sikhism by the Brahminical social order, within two decades British colonial rule effected several changes in Punjabi society and culture: the decline of Sikh aristocracy, the gradual emergence of an urban middle class, the dissipation of the "national intellectual life" of the Punjab owing to the neglect and decay of indigenous education, and a new bureaucratic system with Western-style executive and judicial branches, necessitating emphasis on western education and attainment of skills required for new occupations such as law, administration and education. Western science and Christian ethics also spurred the need for self-examination and evolution, and modernisation aroused among the Sikhs concern for survival and self-definition. Further challenges included the proselytisation of the deistic Brahmo Samaji and neo-Hindu Arya Samaji reform movements of Hinduism, the Muslim Ahmadiyah of Qadian and Anjuman-i-Himayat-i-Islam movements in Lahore, and British-backed Christian movements.

Sikh institutions deteriorated further under the administration of the mahants, supported by the British, who in addition to being considered as ignoring the needs of the Sikh community of the time, allowed the gurdwaras to turn into spaces for societal undesirables like petty thieves, drunks, pimps, and peddlers of unsavory and licentious music and literature, with which they themselves took part in such activities. In addition, they also allowed non-Sikh, Brahmanical practices to take root in the gurdwaras, including idol worship, caste discrimination, and allowing non-Sikh pandits and astrologers to frequent them, and began to simply ignore the needs of the general Sikh community, as they used gurdwara offerings and other donations as their personal revenue, and their positions became increasingly corrupt and hereditary. Hindu priesthood, which had begun to make way into Sikh places of worship under the mahants during the Empire, had come to guide Sikh rites and ceremonies after annexation. Some local congregations marshalled popular pressure against them and to relinquish control, but the large revenue derived from gurdwara estates empowered them to resist such pressure.

=== Antecedents ===
In response to these developments arose several Sikh movements: Nirankari, Namdhari, the Singh Sabha ("revivalism and renaissance") and the Panch Khalsa Diwan ("aggressive fundamentalism").

==== Nirankārīs ====
Growing sentiments against these creeping practices would give rise to the first reformist movement, the Nirankari movement, started by Baba Dyal Das (1783–1855). The Nirankaris condemned the growing idol worship, obeisance to living gurus, and influence of Brahminical ritual that had crept into the Sikh Panth. Though not an initiated Khalsa, he urged Sikhs to return to their focus to a formless divine (niraṅkār) and described himself as a niraṅkārī, favoring the revival of the traditional simplicity, austerity, and purity of Sikh rites and ceremonies.

He was particularly opposed to all idol worship, including the practice of keeping idols and pictures of the ten Sikh Gurus and praying before them, which had begun during the time of the Sikh Empire. Maharaja Ranjit Singh of the Sikh Empire was said to have appreciated his teachings, but the death rites of Ranjit Singh, including the sati of his queens and maidservants, would provide further impetus to Dyal Das to return to Sikh fundamentals. Gurdwara Peshawarian in Rawalpindi, Dyal Das' headquarters, which had been granted a jagīr by Ranjit Singh, would come to be occupied by the British as they looked upon his movement with suspicion. The movement would survive by relocating out of town to continue propagating its teachings, and would remain potent and active campaigners in the late 19th century and early 20th century for the removal of all idols and images from the Golden Temple and other gurdwaras.

==== Nāmdhārīs ====
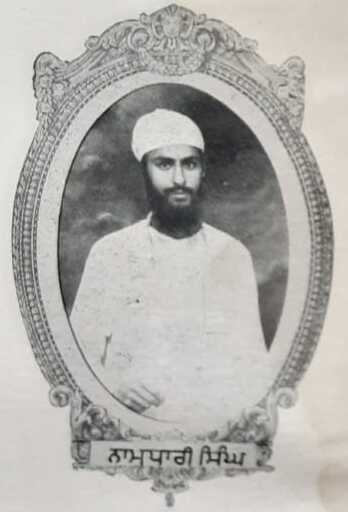
Namdhari Sikh, detail from portrait photographs of Sikh men from various kinds, appearances, and sects of Sikhism, from the 1930 first edition of Mahan Kosh

The Namdhari sect was founded as one of the Sikh revivalist movements during the late rule of Ranjit Singh by Balak Singh, then carried forth by Ram Singh after he left Nau Nihal Singh's regiment of the Sikh Khalsa Army at the end of the First Anglo-Sikh War in 1845. They did not believe in any religious ritual other than the repetition of God's name, including the worship of idols, graves, tombs, gods, or goddesses. The Namdharis had more of a social impact due to the fact that they emphasised Khalsa identity and the authority of the Guru Granth Sahib, particularly from the middle of nineteenth century onward.

In addition to the religious aspect of his teachings opposing idolatry and Brahminical ritual at Sikh sites, the sect also introduced a political aspect, rejecting anything British, including the boycott of British courts, postal system, foreign cloth, and cooperation, drawing the attention of colonial authorities. It grew significantly in the 17 subahs of the colonial state, particularly in the Amritsar, Sialkot, Jalandhar, Ferozepur, Ludhiana, Ambala, Karnal, Malerkotla, Nabha and Patiala subahs. In 1862, upon his assuming leadership, Ram Singh had prophesied the rebirth of Guru Gobind Singh and the establishment of a new Sikh dynasty to displace the British, introducing a political element alongside what had been an exclusive focus on social reform. The sect's anti-British stand brought them into conflict with the British army and police. They would destroy idols, tombs, and graves, drawing local ire and resulting in their gatherings being banned in 1863, and the arrest and execution of 65 Namdharis in July 1872 along with the exile of its leader to Burma, and the execution of 61 more in 1878 by cannon for going on weapons raids and attacking cow butchers in Malerkotla, an idiosyncrasy of the sect.

The impact of the two revivalist movements, created a feeling among Sikh masses for reform and a return to Sikh fundamentals, would set the stage for the Singh Sabha. Unlike these movements, however, the changes sought by the Singh Sabha would not be simply religious in nature or lead to new sectarianisms, but had mass appeal influencing the entire community, striving with considerable success to restore the old purity of religious thought and practice.

== Foundation and growth ==
Singh Sabha movement co-founders
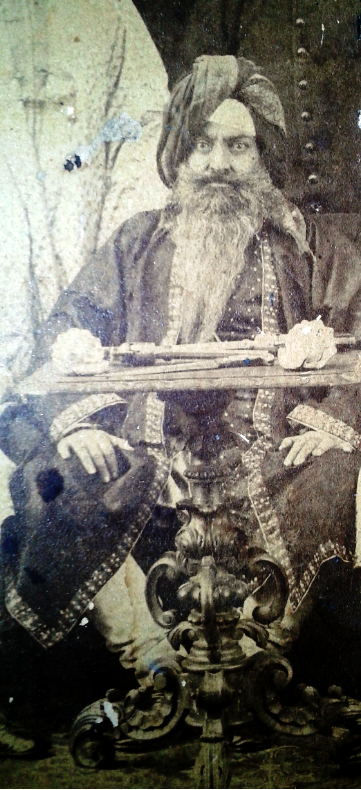
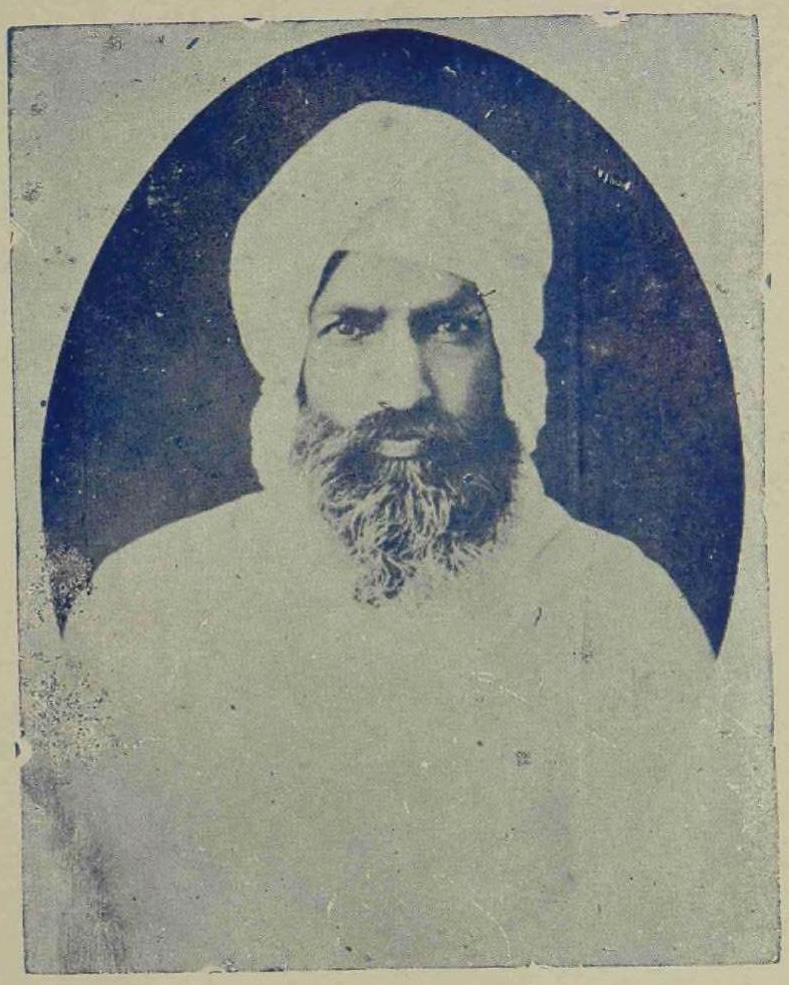
Thakur Singh Sandhawalia (left) and Bhai Gurmukh Singh (right)

The Singh Sabha movement was co-founded by Thakur Singh Sandhawalia and Bhai Gurmukh Singh. The first Singh Sabha was founded in 1873 in Amritsar as a response to what were identified as three main threats:

- Christian missionary activity, and the conversion of four Sikh youth in the Amritsar Mission School that year,
- the “reverse-proselytising” of the Arya Samaj with their Shuddhi ("purification") campaigns, which were part of the rising tide of Hindu nationalist consciousness fomenting in the country, and
- the possibility of losing British patronage of Sikhs in general due to the rebellious actions of groups like the Namdharis.

The objectives of the Singh Sabha were as follows:

- Restoration of Sikh rites and elimination of other religious practices,
- propagation of Sikhism as directed by the Sikh gurus,
- publishing and distributing Sikh literature to these ends (with the first printing press in the Punjab, with Punjabi in Gurmukhi in Lahore in 1876),
- promotion of the Punjabi language, counteracting a strong trend towards Braj classicism in literary and scholarly tradition. Earlier advanced by the Sikh intelligentsia of G. W. Leitner's Anjuman-i-Panjab society in the 1860s, which worked to legitimise Punjabi and Gurmukhi as successors to Persian in educational (successful by 1877) and administrative capacities, and later by the Sikh Educational Conference;
- opening Sikh colleges and schools to educate in Sikh traditions and way of life,
- avoidance of all politics from the movement,
- confining Singh Sabha membership to Sikhs alone, not enrolling patits until expiation and reconverting,
- nothing disparaging to other faiths would be preached,
- authorising the management to permit enrollment of those among the ruling classes who sympathised with the movement's objectives.

Along with the British had come English-educated Bengalis and Kayasthas that served as the lower rung of the British administration in Punjab. The Bengali middle-elite began to introduce values and ideologies from British-ruled Bengal, and introducing the Brahmo Samaj, a Hindu reform movement composed of English-speaking Bengalis had set up branches in several Punjabi cities in the 1860s. The newly English-educated in Punjab, overwhelmingly Hindu, initially accepted Bengali modernity, before tensions between this English-educated class in Punjab and the Brahmo Samaj in the 1870s and 1880s led to the region's Hindus turning to the more aggressive, less syncretic Arya Samaj movement, founded by Swami Dayanand Saraswati, a Brahmin from Gujarat, who arrived in Punjab in 1877, at the invitation of Anglicised Hindu Punjabis, Bengalis, and Sardar Vikram Singh Ahluwalia. Promoting the use of Hindi, the "ārya bhāṣā," as the medium of education and as a mother tongue, and influenced by colonial rationality and science, the movement attracted newly educated sections of the colonial Hindu populace in particular, finding it more relevant to the religiously competitive northwest. In 1885, the Singh Sabha, Arya Samaj, and Theosophical Society contributed to the founding of the Indian National Congress.

=== Amritsar Singh Sabha ===
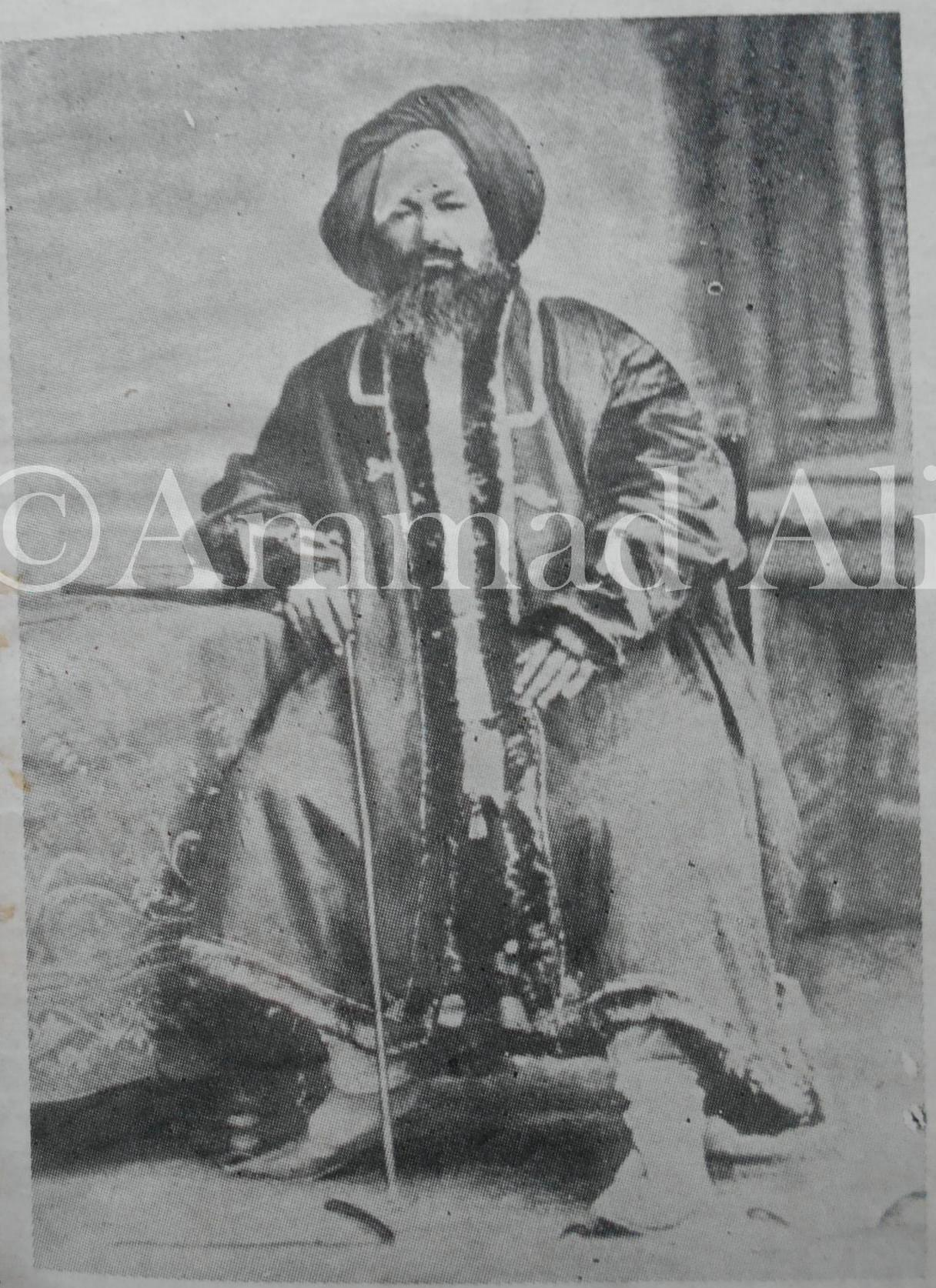
Photograph of Khem Singh Bedi seated, circa mid-to-late 19th century

This first Singh Sabha, the Sri Guru Singh Sabha Amritsar, led by Khem Singh Bedi, convened a founding meeting in Guru Bagh, Amritsar, on 30 July 1873, with its first formal meeting, or jor-mel, taking place in front of the Akal Takht on 1 October 1873. Sardar Thakur Singh Sandhawalia was appointed its chairman, Giani Gian Singh as secretary, Sardar Amar Singh as assistant secretary, and Bhai Dharam Singh of Bunga Majithia as treasurer. The initial membership numbered 95, with most of its members being elites, making it one of the richest Singh Sabhas.

Though largely concerned with defending Sikhism against Hindu and Christian criticism, it saw Sikhism as part of a "broadly defined" Hinduism, and was set up and backed by a faction of Khatri Sikhs, Gianis, and granthis, many of whom where direct descendants of the early Sikh Gurus. They had rejected the Khalsa initiation practices like the Khande di Pahul ceremony on the grounds that it threatened their caste and polluted their ritual boundaries which they considered as primary. They had gained social prominence in the pre-British 18th- and colonial-era 19th-century Punjab by taking over gurdwaras and Sikh institutions, while Khalsa warriors confronted the Mughal state and Afghan forces for the survival of the Sikh community.

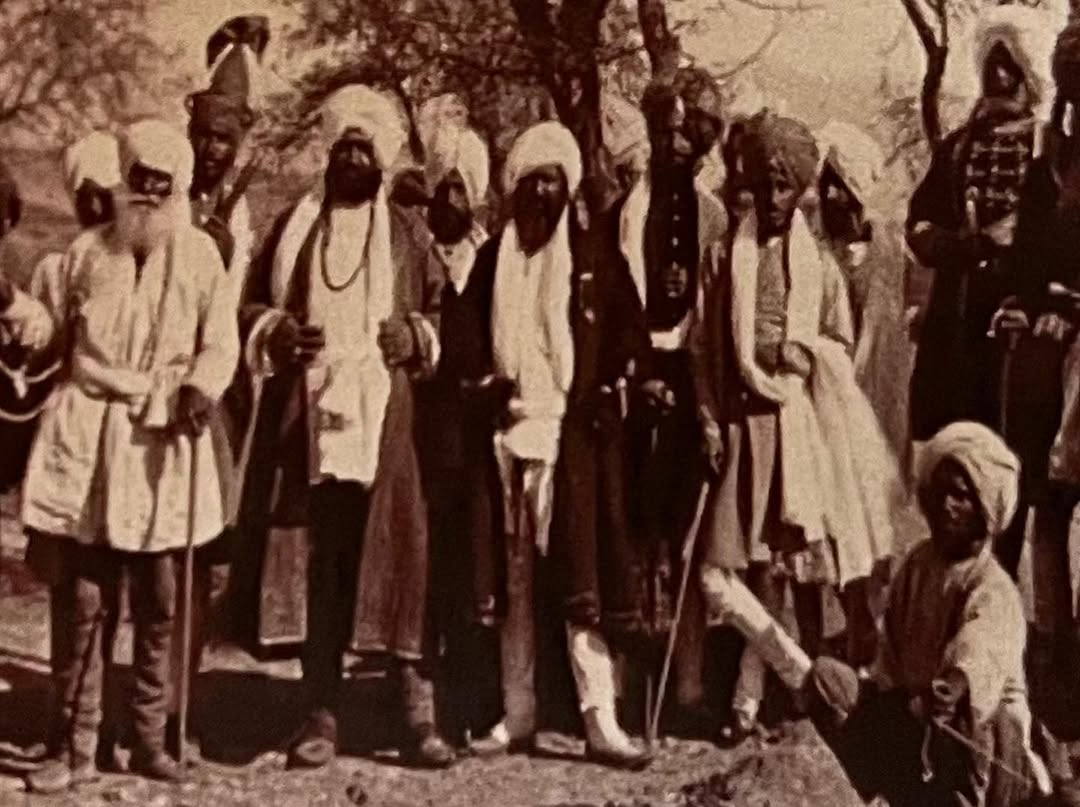
Photograph of Baba Khem Singh Bedi and followers on a hunt, Hasan Abdal, Punjab, 1885

While the Amritsar faction resented the democratic tendency within the Khalsa groups, they continued to co-exist within the broader Sikh panth, even as they remained aloof from the mainstream Khalsa practices. They considered Guru Nanak to be an avatar, or incarnation, of the Hindu deity Vishnu, and saw Sikhism as a tradition aligned with Vaishnavism; and these included the Nirmala, Udasi, and Giani schools of Brahminical thought. As such, they aligned Sikh tradition with the Brahminical social structure and caste ideology; their predominant concern was to protect the social framework in which they held status. For these groups the principle of authority of Sikh tradition was invested in living gurus (as Khem Singh Bedi, leader of the Amritsar faction, liked to be regarded) rather than the principle of shabad-guru, or the Guru Granth Sahib as the Guru, which was upheld by the dominant Khalsa tradition. In addition to himself, Khem Singh claimed special reverence for all members of clans to which the Gurus had belonged.

=== Lahore Singh Sabha ===
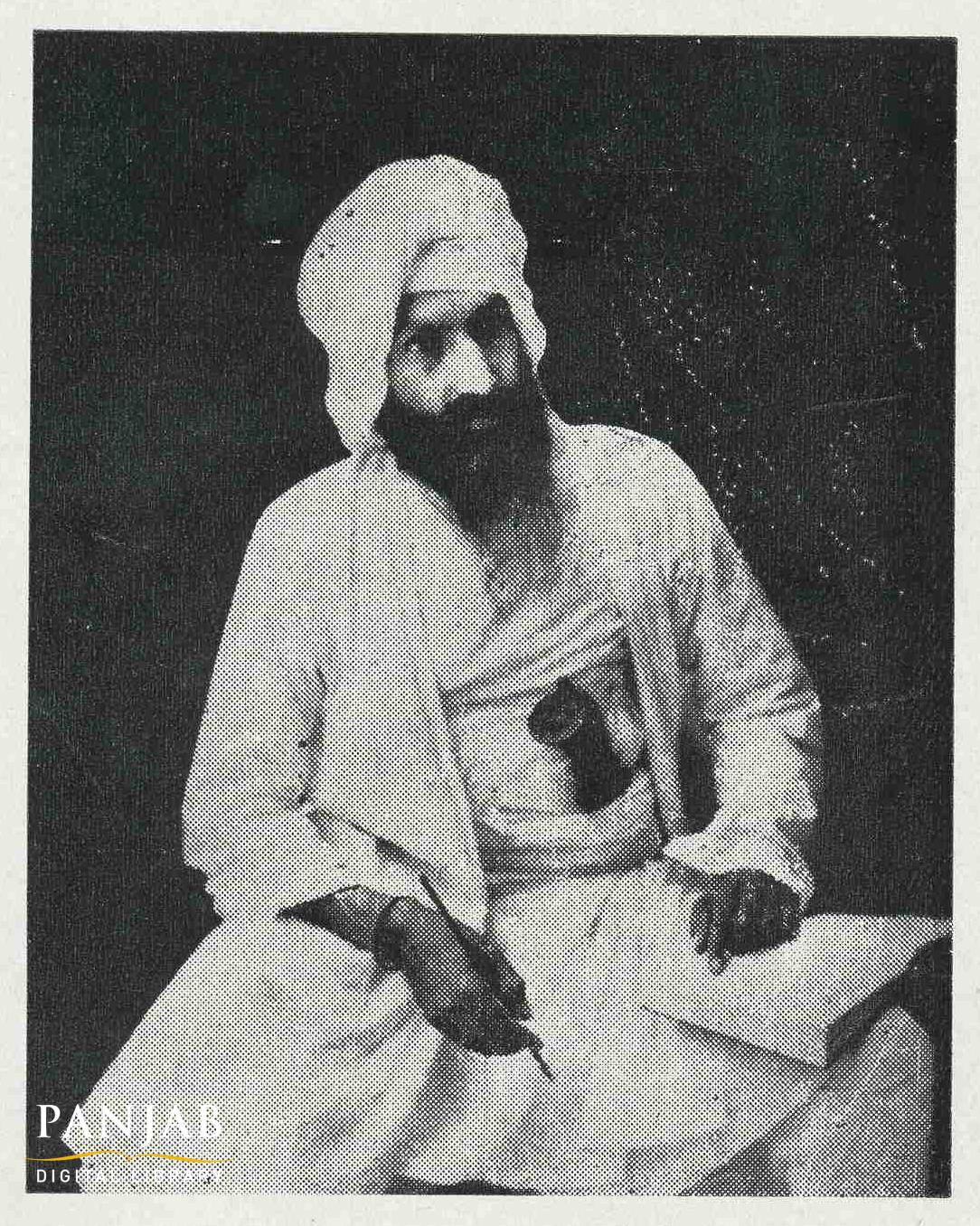
Photograph of Prof. Gurmukh Singh

Professor Gurmukh Singh, a teacher of Punjabi and mathematics at the Punjab University College and graduate of Oriental College, where Harsha Singh, a Darbar Sahib granthi from Tarn Taran, had been the first teacher of Punjabi, would interest prominent Sikh citizens of Lahore, such as Diwan Buta Singh and Sardar Mehar Singh Chawla, along with Harsha Singh, in Singh Sabha goals. Gurmukh Singh believed Sikhism to be a sovereign religion having equality of all believers without distinction of caste or status as its basic social creed. The Sri Guru Singh Sabha Lahore was founded on 2 November 1879, holding weekly meetings with Diwan Buta Singh as president, Gurmukh Singh as secretary and Harsha Singh, Ram Singh and Karam Singh as members formed its working committee.

Shortly thereafter, Nihang Sikhs began influencing the movement, followed by a sustained campaign by the Tat Khalsa. The Amritsar faction was opposed by these predominant groups of the Sikhs, particularly those who held Khalsa beliefs, who through access to education and employment, had reached a position to challenge them, forming the Tat Khalsa faction, or "true Khalsa," in 1879, headed by Gurmukh Singh, Harsha Singh Arora, Diwan Buta Singh, Mehar Singh Chawla, Ram Singh and Karam Singh, later joined by Jawahir Singh and Giani Ditt Singh, and the Lahore Singh Sabha. The Tat Khalsa's monotheism, iconoclastic sentiments, egalitarian social values and notion of a standardised Sikh identity did not blend well with the polytheism, idol worship, caste distinctions, and diversity of rites espoused by the Amritsar faction. The Tat Khalsa met with immediately successful organisational and ideological challenging of the Amritsar faction as early as the early 1880s, emerging successful, representing the Tat Khalsa faction. Ditt Singh, as a Mazhabi Sikh, was critical of Khem Singh Bedi's views on pollution, ritual, and lack of distinct identity.

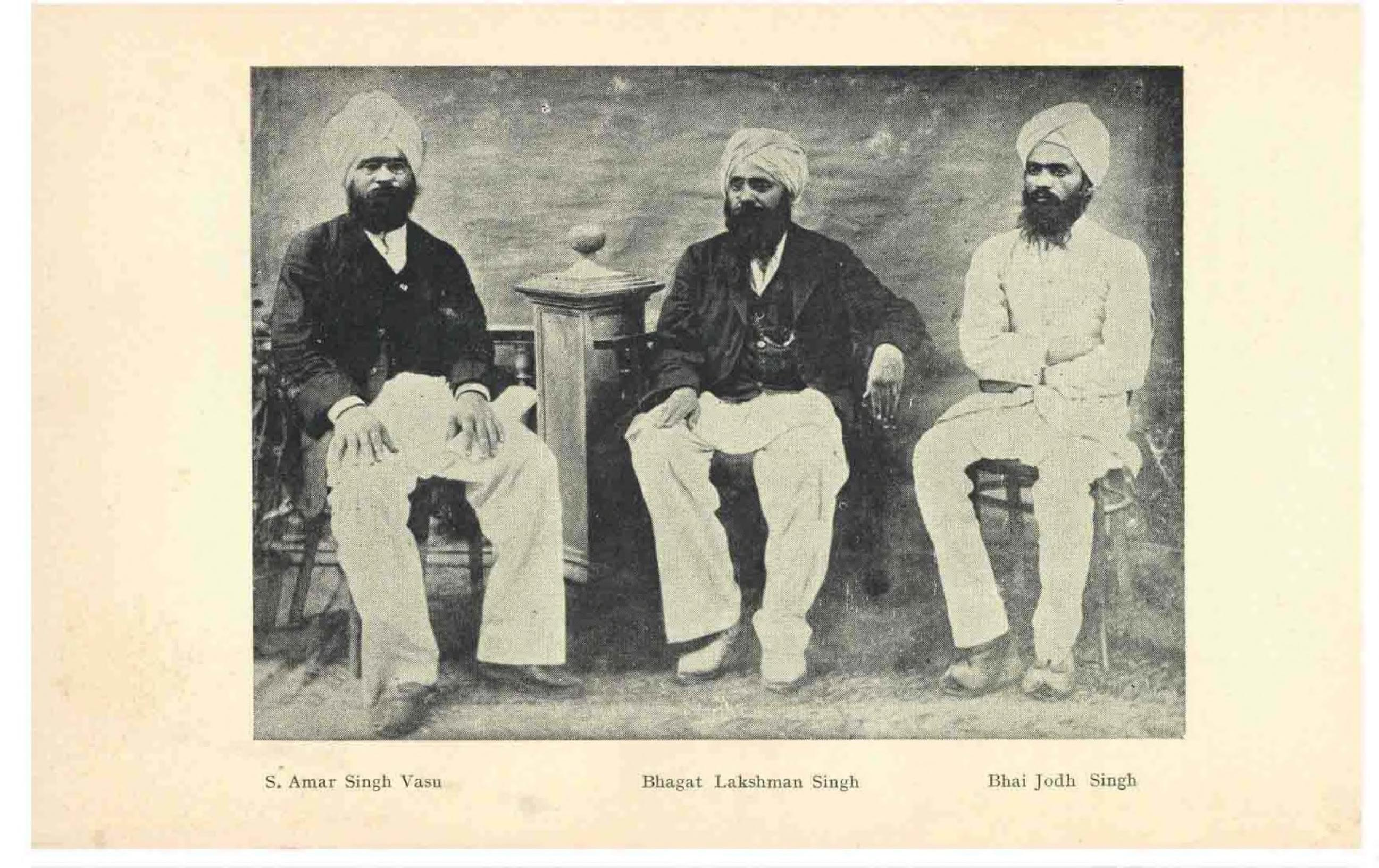
Photograph of Sardar Amar Singh Wasu, Bhagat Lakshman Singh, and Bhai Jodh Singh seated together

Between the 1870s and 1890s, the efforts of Tat Khalsa reformers had focused on reinforcing the distinct Sikh identity separate from Muslim and Hindu practices, the primacy of the Khalsa initiation and codes of conduct, and setting up schools and colleges in town and villages, initiatives that continued through the following CKD period. Through print media newspapers and publications, like the Khalsa Akhbar (in Gurmukhi Punjabi, the first Punjabi newspaper) and The Khalsa (in English), the Singh Sabha solidified a general consensus of the nature of Sikh identity, and that the source of authentic Sikhi was the early Sikh tradition, specifically the period of the Sikh Gurus and immediately after. The Adi Granth was held to be the authoritative Sikh literature, along with compositions by Guru Gobind Singh, the works of Bhai Gurdas, the janamsakhis, and Gurbilas literature and the Rahitnamas, later codified by the SGPC as the Sikh Rehat Maryada. Non-Sikh practices accumulated during the period of institutional neglect by the British and mahant control, including idol worship, the primacy of non-Sikh Brahmins, caste discrimination, superstitious cults of folk heroes and Hindu deities, and Vedic rites officiated by Brahmins during the mahant period, were banished, and Sikh rites and symbols including the Khalsa initiation, the names “Singh and “Kaur,” the 5 Ks, Sikh birth, death, and marriage rites, and the compulsory learning of Gurmukhi and Punjabi in Khalsa schools, an institution found in modern gurdwaras worldwide, were formalised.

=== Other Singh Sabhas ===
After the Lahore Singh Sabha, many other Singh Sabhas modeled after it were formed in every town and many villages throughout Punjab, exceeding over 100 in number by the end of the 19th century with many affiliated to the Lahore Sabha, or remaining unaligned. Each chapter, while similar in composition, differed greatly in stability and constitution, with memberships ranging from five to hundreds. As the movement gained momentum, Singh Sabhas not only throughout Punjab, but in several other parts of India and abroad, from London, England to Shanghai, China.

The Karachi Singh Sabha had a fifteen-member executive committee, with six positions reserved for sahajdhari Sikhs. The Karachi Singh Sabha consisted of both keshdhari and sehajdhari Sikhs. The Ferozpur and Tarn Taran Sabhas had female members playing an active role alongside the men, with the Tarn Taran Sabha having a special female branch, the Istri Sat Sang Sabha. Bhai Takht Singh (1860–1937) of the Singh Sabha Ferozepur also advocated for women's education. A Ferozepur Sikh Kanya Mahavidyala (boarding school for girls) was established by Takht Singh in the 1890s. The Gurmat Granth Pracharak Sabha in Amritsar, established on 8 April 1885, researched and published books on ideological and historical topics. The Shuddhi Sabha, for conversions and reconversions into Sikhism, was founded in April 1893 by Dr. Jai Singh. The Sri Guru Hitkarni Singh Sabha, which would break with the Lahore Sabha in 1886 over its advocacy of the restoration of Duleep Singh to the throne, hence entailing involvement in politics, would reconcile with the Singh Sabha in 1895. The Sri Guru Upkar Pracharni Sabha, in addition to propagating Sikhism, would counterattack on Sikhism from the Arya Samaj's Arya Kumar Sabha. The Singh Sabha Tarn Taran and the Khalsa Diwan Majha pushed for reform in Sikh shrines in Tarn Taran and Amritsar.

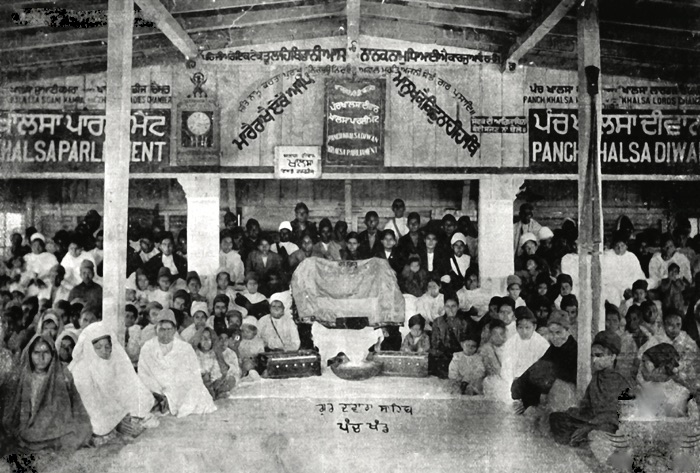
Photograph of a congregation of the Panch Khalsa Diwan, established by Teja Singh Bhasaur

Among the local Singh Sabhas, the Singh Sabha Bhasaur, later the Panch Khalsa Diwan Bhasaur, established in 1893 under Teja Singh (1867–1933) was the most active. Particularly strict, egalitarian, and unwavering on Khalsa ethos, identity, and practice, it drew heavily from the middle and lower strata of society. Its fundamentalism would draw it away from the Singh Sabha mainstream. The Bhasaur Singh Sabha was marked by militancy. It distributed leaflets condemning prevailing Sikh practices and promoted Sikhs to undergo the pahul and become baptised Khalsa.

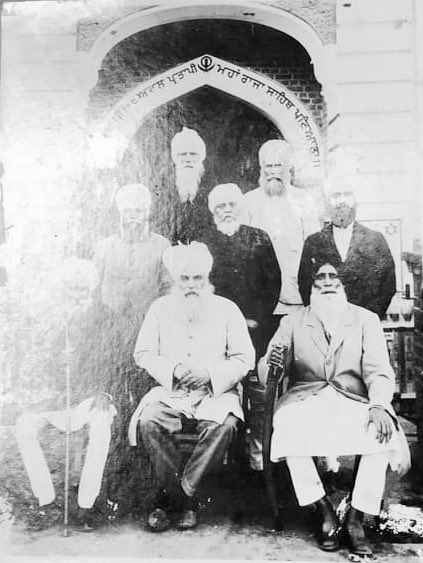
Photograph of a gathering of some of the stalwarts of the Singh Sabha movement at the durbar of Bhupinder Singh of Patiala State, ca.1900–1938

Sikh princes allied themselves with various political and social factions within the Singh Sabha. The first to be involved prominently was Raja Bikrama Singh of Faridkot, with the Amritsar Singh Sabha and various Sikh educational projects. Meanwhile, Maharaja Hira Singh Nabha and Maharaja Rajinder Singh of Patiala sustained Sikh newspapers of the Lahore Singh Sabha, with the Khalsa Tract Society created by Vir Singh in 1894. Kahn Singh Nabha would also serve the movement in various capacities under Hira Singh's patronage, as would Pandit Varyam Singh, whose services would also be sought and sponsored by other aristocratic families including the Sodhis of Kartarpur. All the Sikh princes donated heavily to the establishment of Khalsa College, Amritsar, receiving seats on the college board. Its 1892 establishment had been spurred by the 1886 founding of the D.A.V. College Lahore.

=== Khalsa Diwans ===
The rivalry of the Lahore and the Amritsar factions was often intense, as the Amritsar faction was dominated by elites and aristocrats who wanted more total say, and the Lahore faction who drew from all castes, including traditionally non-elite castes, and was more democratic in nature. Despite this, under the common goal of reform, Sikh public leaders formed a central committee and a Singh Sabha General in 1880. On April 11, 1883, this General Sabha evolved into Khalsa Diwan Amritsar, with about 37 affiliated local Singh Sabha chapters. Other Singh Sabhas, however, opposed it and there were also internal dissensions, as Khem Singh and Raja Bikram Singh opposed measures to democratise, wanting more absolute power and not wanting Lahore leaders to be more than ordinary members. The Singh Sabha chapters could not agree on its constitution or its leadership structure, ultimately leading to a split into two Khalsa Diwans, which would differ greatly in nature and composition.

The Khalsa Diwan Amritsar, remaining with about 7 chapters, re-organised itself as a bicameral body consisting of the Mahan Khand (the aristocracy) and Saman Khand (the priestly class and body of believers), while the breakaway Khalsa Diwan Lahore, with about 30 chapters, set up on 10–11 April 1886, with Sardar Attar Singh Bhadaur as President and Professor Gurmukh Singh as secretary, retained a much more equal footing between members, in line with its principles. The Amritsar faction was largely defunct thereafter, with eventually three chapters remaining at Amritsar, Faridkot, and Rawalpindi, as it failed to gain popular support; decisions from the Saman Khand commoner house were subject to the supervision and approval of the Mahan Khand elite house, and the majority of the Singh Sabha would shift allegiance to the egalitarian, decentralised Lahore Sabha.

In its first of several defeats, the Amritsar faction proposed renaming the Singh Sabha to the Sikh Singh Sabha in 1883, as he perceived that the Singh Sabha had already become synonymous with the Khalsa Sikhs, and wanted to attract unbaptised and other minor Sikh sects to the organisation. The opposition to this initiative was so overwhelming that Khem Singh Bedi was forced to drop it in the next meeting of the Diwan in April 1884. Despite this, both Diwans, even despite disagreements and even litigation, worked for common goals with the same programs, even as the Khalsa Diwan Lahore overtook its rival in popularity.

Though the two terms would begin to become synonymous, Singh Sabhas tended to form in small towns, while Khalsa Diwans formed in larger towns and cities. Khalsa Diwan meetings were held biannually.

== Sikh-Arya Samaj relations ==
The Arya Samaj espoused a "purified," rationalistic, codified Hinduism, based on the sole infallibility of the Vedas and dismissing most post-Vedic literature and tradition, and a "Vedic Golden Age" upon which to model Hindu society, conceived by specific interpretations of cultural traditions while retaining some post-Vedic thought. It rejected contemporary Hindu practices like polytheism, idol and avatar worship, temple offerings, pilgrimages, the widow remarriage prohibition, child marriage, and sati as degenerate accretions, as well as the priestcraft of Brahmins, considered to have misled the masses through introducing such deviations. These repudiations were in accord with Sikh tradition, which the Arya Samaj first saw as a reforming movement akin to their own, and many young Sikh reformists had initially coordinated with them to counteract the growing influence of the Christian missionaries, including Jawahir Singh Kapur, Giani Ditt Singh, Maya Singh, and Bhagat Lakshman Singh, with the understanding that the purging of error among the Hindus would bring them closer to the purer Sikhism of yesteryear. Dayanand initially seldom criticised Sikhs, focusing mainly on Christian missionaries, "orthodox" Hindus in particular, and increasingly Muslims; any strong or violent opposition to him came solely from those orthodox Hindu forces, most condemned by him, who would vilify him and write counterattacks.

=== Shuddhi ===
Primarily focused on proselytisation, and noting Christian missionary success in proselytising to lower castes, the militant Samajis developed their own conversion ritual, a novelty in Hindu tradition, called shuddhi, to convert Muslims or Christians and to "purify" the untouchable castes into Hinduism, who traditionally had been denied access to Hindu texts by the priestly class. Orthodox Brahminism did not permit admission of outcastes or readmission of lapsed adherents, and not until the rise of the Arya Samaj that such reconversion was encouraged, which elicited continued "Sanatanist" opposition. Shuddhi was reinterpreted under the influence of Christian conversion from a caste purification ritual to a conversion ritual, to convert non-Hindus and outcastes into dvija or pure-caste Hindus, between 1889 and 1891. This was followed slowly and reluctantly by other Samajis, and was disapproved by traditionalists. Though at first there was no standard procedure for the new practice, and more conservative Samaji leaders were reluctant to sponsor them, shuddhi for caste readmission was originally the full orthodox prāyaścitta, involving bathing in the Ganges, feeding Brahmins, and the consumption of the panchagavya, or cow products: milk, butter, curd, urine and dung; it would be simplified by 1893 to tonsure, hom, janeu, and the recitation of the Gayatri Mantra, showing a new confidence in the practice by then.

=== Innovations ===
In addition to Dayanand's new Western-influenced ideas about a "highly specific scriptural canon," along with a long list of traditional Hindu writings to be condemned and repudiated, another religious innovation of the Arya Samaj was the nationalistic idea of a nationwide Hinduism, as opposed to a myriad of different dharmas previously always qualified by subregion or type, which was besieged by, and opposed to, both foreign interference and "unreformed Brahmanical hierarchies". This established the organisation as an important factor in the development of Hindu religious nationalism. In addition to boosting the collective morale of the Hindus in Punjab, by enabling a shift in self-identification from a regional minority with no political heritage to part of a national majority, Samaji identity would also provide an answer to criticisms of superstition and casteism from other communities, though at the expense of their Punjabi linguistic identity and traditional modes of Punjabi saint-worship, in favor of a wider Hindu ethnoreligious identity and the traditional Hindu pantheon. The confrontational character of the Arya Samaj would lead to the decline of the more Western-oriented, syncretic Brahmo Samaj in Punjab after 1877. The Arya Samaj would nevertheless build on Brahmo Samaj techniques, as well as those of Christian missionaries and both modern and traditional native ones, thus reinterpreting Hinduism into a pracharak-dharma, or conversion religion, able to compete for converts.

=== Decline and end ===
Hindu-Sikh relations first began to decline with the publication of Saraswati's polemical and ideological Satyarth Prakash, published in 1875, the year of the sect's first establishment in Bombay, which portrayed the Sikh gurus as "misguided and ill-educated simpletons" who had diverted people from the Vedas.

Two years later in 1877, Dayanand would visit Punjab, establishing the sect in Lahore. It was not until he reached Amritsar did he begin to belittle Sikhism, its founders, and current practices, provoking Nihang hostility and threats. Addressing Sikhism briefly in his book, he wrote that "Nanakji [the founder of Sikhism], had noble aims, but he had no learning. He knew the language of the villages of his country. He had no knowledge of Vedic scriptures or of Sanskrta," without which he lacked Vedic knowledge and was thus incapable of permanent accomplishment, teaching little of value. He considered the state of Sikhs to be as ignorant and degenerate as Puranic Hindus, and as worthy to be noted, refuted, and forgotten, stating that while "[t]hey do not worship idols," their treatment of the Guru Granth Sahib was essentially bibliolatrous. According to Khushwant Singh, "It did not take the orthodox Sikhs long to appreciate that Dayanand's belief in the infallibility of the Vedas was as uncompromising as that of the Muslims in the Koran.... Dayanand set the tone; his zealous admirers followed suit." He regarded the Guru Granth Sahib as a book of secondary importance, the Sikh gurus and theologians as unlearned particularly due to their ignorance of Sanskrit (to be thus deemed as maha murkh or "great fool"), and denounced Guru Nanak. His followers deemed the infallibility of the uneducated Guru Nanak among Sikhs to be a threat to the infallibility of the educated Dayanand, and the points of convergence between the two regarding renewal to instead lead to competition.

In correspondence after having left Punjab, he would write that his opinion of Sikhism had changed after his stay, and the objectionable content would be removed in the next edition. This would not be done before his death in 1883, however, and the second edition would attack Sikhs, Sikhism, and its scriptures even more directly, as would other Samaji publications; beginning in the Arya Patrika newspaper in 1885, which described a Sikhism that was begun with noble aims as having degenerated. Along with the increased hostility of its followers, this would disillusion some Sikh followers and sympathisers of the movement.

==== Mahatma party ====
Some notable Arya Samaj members expressed disagreement with Samaji conduct and attempted to reconcile with the Sikhs. Lahore judge Lala Amolak Ram Munsif, who in an 1887 public letter deemed Dayanand's word as neither infallible or binding upon its members, and his opinion as "wrong," decried the "jealous effort" of "instigating our respected and glorious Sikh brethren against the Arya dharma." This would help to reconcile earlier Sikh allies to some extent, but would not last as subsequent Samaj leaders would increase attacks on the Sikhs. Three Samajis in particular, socially radical and religiously militant, would determine the course of the Arya Samaj: Pandit Lala Guru Datt, Pandit Lekh Ram, and Lala Mahatma Munshi Ram, later known as "Swami Shraddhanand". (Note: These names are preceded by honorifics; "Lala" is an Arora honorific, "Pandit" is for religious scholars and leaders, and "Swami" is for ascetics.)

Guru Datt, Dayanand's successor, would come to increasingly reinterpret Dayanand as a rishi, or sage, and the Satyarth Prakash as a sacred text to be followed unquestioningly. Guru Datt would accrue a worshipful following (including Munshi Ram), who treated him as a spiritual guide, and he would attack Sikh leaders and ideology. Later, Lekh Ram, unlike Dayanand or Guru Datt, was not educated in the Western style and would not focus on orthodox Hinduism or Christianity, but on Islam. By 1893 their "Mahatma" faction would overpower and eventually split from the more conservative faction led by Lala Sain Das, Lala Hans Raj, Lala Lajpat Rai, and Lal Chand, which was less religiously militant and more concerned with educational institutes; the more moderate faction was called the "College Party."

With increasingly radicalised dogmatism, along with its kernani (Christian), kurani (Muslim), and purani (orthodox Hindu) opponents, propaganda targeting Sikhism continued to be published in the Arya Samaj press through the 1880s, further aggravating relations with the Sikhs, and culminated in an article written in 1888 titled Sikhism Past and Present, which ridiculed Guru Nanak and denigrated the state of contemporary Sikhism as even worse than that of the Hindus: "While the prejudices of the Hindu community are gradually fading away before the progress of western civilisation, those of the Sikh community are acquiring fresh strength by their reluctance to keep pace with the march of times.... The intellectual forces brought into play by the spread of English education are slowly and imperceptibly infusing a spirit of liberalism into the Hindu mind, but it is our individual opinion, and we think we have good grounds to come to such a conclusion, that the Sikh is as much a bigoted and narrow-minded being now as he was thirty years back...," thus backsliding into superstition and ignorance, having been left backwards by their loss of political dominance.

The increasingly shrill anti-Sikh tone continued into the next few years, and the Arya Samaj would condemn the descendants of the Gurus forming a religious aristocracy in the 1887 Arya Patrika, as the Amritsar Singh Sabha was characterised by.

===== 11th anniversary =====
Continued public antagonism continued towards Sikhism by the Arya Samaj leading up to its 11th anniversary celebration at Lahore in November 1888, when the anti-modernist leader Pandit Guru Datt chose to publicly attack Sikhism, repeating the anti-Sikh remarks of the Satyarth Prakash in his speech. Guru Datt denigrated Guru Gobind Singh as "not even a hundredth part like our Maharishi Swami Dayanand Saraswati," Sikhs as ignorant and hardly having religion, and stated, "if Swami Dayanand Saraswati Maharaj called Guru Nanak a great fraud, what did it matter? He held the sum of the Vedas in his hands, so if he wanted to compare this light with anything, what was that?" Other Samaj leaders like Swami Swatmananda, Lala Murlidhar, and Lekh Ram seconded the comments, the latter two rising to do so.

This was followed by Lekh Ram's speech, attacking Sikhs further and physically insulting the Guru Granth Sahib placed before him. While approved by the majority of Samajis present, Sikhs also present in the meeting, including Lahore Samaj Vice President Jawahir Singh, Giani Ditt Singh, and Maya Singh would resign their Samaj membership and join the Lahore Singh Sabha movement, where they were welcomed by Gurmukh Singh; Jawahir Singh and Giani Ditt Singh would go on to become leading figures in the Sikh resurgence.

Jawahir Singh and Ditt Singh had sought Arya Samaj partnership based on common ground, having ignored Dayanand's insults of Guru Nanak to do so. Jawahir Singh has accompanied Dayanand during his tour of Punjab, serving as vice-president of the Arya Samaj's Paropkarini Sabha from 1878 to 1883, as Secretary of the Lahore Arya Samaj since its inception, and Secretary of the Dayanand Anglo-Vedic Fund College Committee.

Thereafter only a few Sikhs would remain with the Arya Samaj, fully accepting its platform.

====== Reaction ======
The Sikhs held a protest meeting denouncing the Arya Samaj, specifically Guru Datt. Both Sikh and non-Sikh newspapers denounced the Arya Samaj habit of constantly attacking the leaders and doctrines of other faiths, and Jawahir Singh wrote of his disillusionment with the Arya Samaj in his tract Amal-i-Arya ("Acts of the Aryas") and released a critical biography of Swami Dayanand in 1889.

In response, Radha Kishen Mehta, another prominent Samaji, would release Nuskha-i-Granthi-Phobia ("Prescription for 'Granth-Phobia'"), a "low point for even Punjab polemics," lobbing obscene accusations at the Sikh gurus and Jawahir Singh, and criticising Sikhs. The Arya Samaj continued anti-Sikh street preaching personally criticising the Sikh gurus, and Guru Datt and Lekh Ram continuing their attacks via their newspapers.

This would in turn invite a response from Ganda Singh of the Gurū Upkār Prachārnī Sabhā, Prescription for the Insanity of Dayananda's Followers, answering Arya Samaj insults towards Sikhism, portraying Swami Dayanand as an "uncouth braggart" who spent his time dividing Indians with "daggers of bad words," and defending Sikhism's sovereignty and Punjabi as a viable language not only suited for "rustics and uneducated men".

With the increased need for didactic literature defending and defining the faith, the Khalsa Tract Society would be founded by Vir Singh in 1894. Members paid dues, formed subcommittees to select manuscripts and handle accounts, and had to follow the following conditions: write concise Punjabi, and avoid speaking against other religions.

==== Shuddhi Sabha ====
Attacks from neo-Hindus like the earlier Brahmos as well as the Aryas Samajis had existed since before there had been Punjabis literate in English to counter them; these sustained attacks would result in the breaking of ties with the Arya Samaj and the definitive end of Sikh support in 1888, replacing an earlier perception of shared goals; Arya Samaj attacks during the 1880s would irrevocably embitter relations with the Sikhs, as well as those other communities, and their aggressiveness would be met with protective associations of Sikhs, amongst others. It had been the Singh Sabhas of the Lahore faction that had earlier sought cooperation with the Arya Samajis, and occasional instances of cooperation on mutual interest like opposing Christian conversions would continue.

First cooperating in Rawalpindi in 1885 against a Muslim conversion, later the Lahore Shuddhi Sabha would be jointly run by the Sikhs and Samajis through the 1890s against Christian and Muslim conversion efforts, as shuddhi had become a major plank of the radical Samajis by 1893. While the three entities operated variously in alliance or independently, Shuddhi Sabha and the Singh Sabhas were largely controlled by Sikhs, and the Arya Samaj, particularly the Mahatma faction would progressively lessen their cooperation with them, to ensure that the "purified" would become Samajis, rather than Sikhs. The Mahatmas, being strict vegetarians unlike the Tat Khalsa and the College Party Arya Samajis, also opposed the use of the controversial "pork test" for converts from Islam. The decrease in support from the predominant Samajist faction would in turn raise Sikh consciousness of its identity, amid continued conflict and mutual denial of being reforming leaders, Sikhs would increasingly accentuate their distinct identity. Shuddhi Sabha conversions to Sikhism would accelerate in 1896, spurring further conversion efforts towards outcastes.

Following the 1897–1898 Arya Samaj split, the College Party Arya Samaj would come to publicly support the Sikhs, denouncing the Mahatma attacks on Sikhism that had begun in Amritsar, calling Dayanand's knowledge of Gurmukhi "imperfect" and rejecting his comments on Guru Nanak as secondhand information not endorsed by the Arya Samaj. This incensed the Mahatma faction, who would again attack Guru Nanak and Sikhism to defend Dayanand's sanctity, while College Party moderates would remain with their Shuddhi Sabha allies.

=== 20th century ===
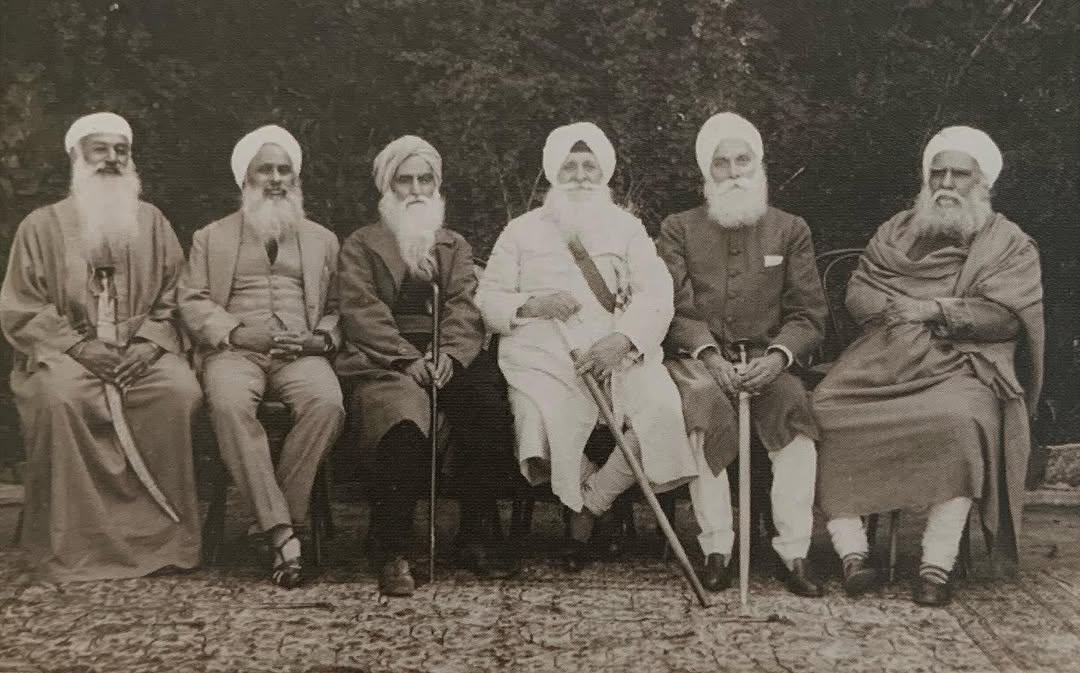
Group photograph of Sikh luminaries of the early 20th century taken in Shimla. From left-to-right: Arjan Singh Bagrian, Jogindra Singh, Umrao Singh Shergill, Gurdial Singh Maan, Kahn Singh Nabha, and Sundar Singh Majithia.

Beginning in 1897, letters in the "Lahore Tribune" newspaper raised the question, "Are Sikhs Hindus?", prompting an inconclusive exchange of literature in response. The issue of Sikh identity was further sharpened by vociferous Arya Samaj attacks on the Sikh faith, issuing pamphlets claiming Sikhism as a reformist strain to be incorporated within Hinduism, even though for a long time the Arya Samaj itself had rebuffed the name Hindu, and led campaigns against it. Nevertheless, a section of Sahajdari Sikh leaders would declare they were Hindus in 1897 before a large public gathering to mark the diamond jubilee of Queen Victoria in Lahore, and Jagat Singh, a Sikh who had stayed with the Arya Samaj after the Lahore anniversary, opined that Sikhism was just an earlier Arya Samaj. The issue of Sikh identity took a legal turn with the death of Dyal Singh Majithia in 1898, when his will was contested in the Punjab High Court as not falling under the Hindu code of inheritance, and the verdict of which elicited disagreement from the Tat Khalsa.

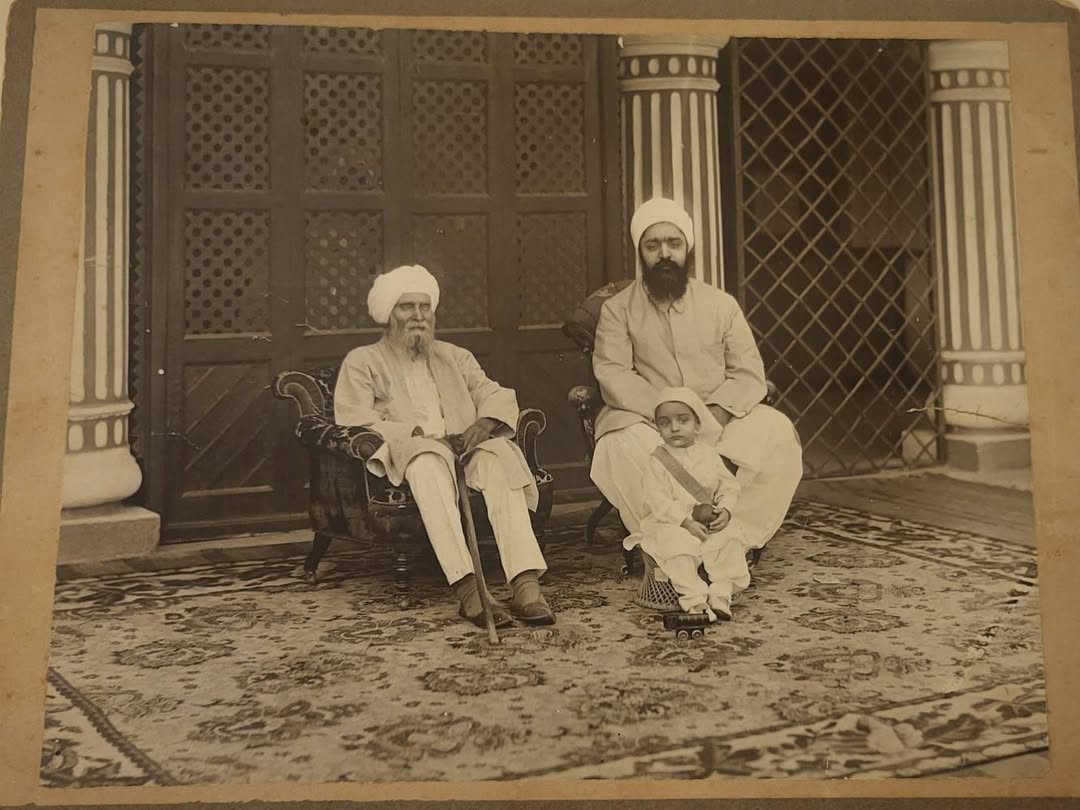
Photograph of Giani Gian Singh with Maharaja Ripudaman Singh of Nabha State and the child Pratap Singh of Nabha State, ca.1920–21

In response to Thakar Das and Bawa Narain Singh's Sikh Hindu Hain ("Sikhs Are Hindus"), Kahn Singh Nabha published his 1899 classic tract Ham Hindu Nahin, which made the case for a distinct Sikh identity. The debate would yield several Sikh types, from the pure Khalsa Sikh dedicated to their distinctness, to those more ancestrally steeped in Hindu practices.

==== Rahtia conversions ====
Shuddhi would go on to have a major impact in the relationship between Hindu and Sikh identities, as, inspired by the then-defunct Shuddhi Sabha, Mahatma Samajis spotted an opportunity to convert Mazhabi Sikhs, who traditionally were seen as polluting to Hindus. A shuddhi conversion ceremony of outcaste Sikhs in 1900 in Lahore, in which two hundred Rahtia Sikhs, seeking purified caste status, had their heads and beards shaved to make them "caste" Hindus and given janeu threads, was decried by the Sikh community, who condemned such efforts to convert Sikhs to Hinduism in protest meetings, the Sikh lack of action, and the refusal of Hinduised Sikh custodians to let them into the Darbar Sahib, criticised by Khalsa Sikhs. Supporting the Rahtia conversions, the College Party Samajis would break their alliance with the Lahore Sabha in 1904. Amid growing disillusionment with the Arya Samaj and less and less willingness to opt into "Hindu" identity, many now saw Samaji conversion as direct a threat as Christian and Muslim conversion, passing resolutions condemning the Arya Samaj, and decrying the concept of shuddhi. Unlike the Arya Samaj shuddhi, the Sikh tradition of conversion and initiation was long established.

In 1905, Sikh reformers would succeed in having idols, and Brahmins officiating rituals thereof, removed from the Darbar Sahib, as intrusions of another faith that was contrary to Sikh teachings. The same dynamics that led Arya Samajis to criticise orthodox Sikhism were used to criticise orthodox Hinduism; in search of a "respectable and defensible" Hinduism, shorn of much of its traditional structure, they had contributed significantly to the ruin of communal harmony in Punjab.

==== Language ====
Language would also become a point of contention between the Arya Samaj and the Singh Sabha by 1900; while both opposed Urdu as the official language of Punjab under the British, the two movements would disagree over which language and script to replace it with. The Arya Samaj favored Hindi (then called "Shastri") in Devanagari, while the Tat Khalsa favored Punjabi in Gurmukhi, considering Hindi to be as foreign to Punjab as Persian or Urdu.

When Punjabi had been successfully inducted into the Punjab University Lahore curriculum through Singh Sabha efforts, and the oriental College Lahore by 1877, this had been opposed by the Hindu board members of the college. This would solidify the perception of Punjabi as a Sikh language, with its literary output largely confined to Sikh writers.

Communal competition was also increasingly driven by economic and job competition.

=== Identity in the 19th century ===
==== Hindu ====
There was no debate about Hindu-Sikh identity until the late nineteenth century, when a new "Hindu" consciousness emerged. According to D. N. Jha, "No Indians described themselves as Hindus before the fourteenth century," and "Hinduism was a creation of the colonial period and cannot lay claim to any great antiquity," as "[t]he British borrowed the word 'Hindu' from India, gave it a new meaning and significance, [and] reimported it into India as a reified phenomenon called Hinduism." The term 'Hindu', ultimately a foreign (Persian) exonym derived for populations adjoining the Indus River, had itself been repurposed around 1830 as 'Hinduism' to refer to the culture and religion of Brahmins, then adopted by other Indians as an anti-colonial national identity. Largely a colonial construct of 19th-century Western hermeneutics, and not historically attached to any doctrine or community, even by the late 19th century this homogenised identity was far from universally claimed or recognised as a religion, with identification rather by sect or caste still common in the 1881 census.

===== Sanatanist =====
The phrase sanatana dharma, previously used in Hindu scriptures to describe various conducts and aphorisms, was also repurposed in the late nineteenth century to refer to this new religious identity in native terms; prior to British colonisation, the phrase did not mean "eternal religion," nor did it delineate "Hinduism" from other religions, as it would come to. However, sanatana dharma would come to denote initially opposing factions of burgeoning Hindu identity, with the reactionary "Sanatanists" ("orthodox" Brahminic traditionalism) who defended the traditional varnashrama, ritualism, murtis, and shunning of outcastes, versus the reformist "Samajist" faction that opposed these.

The Sanatanist Hindu faction in Punjab had not shown any interest in Sikh identity in its first report in 1889. Its earliest known leader, Shardha Ram Phillauri, in his 1865 book Sikhan de Raj di Vithia ("History of Sikh Rule"), written to acquaint the British with the Sikh population and practice, had made no reference to any Hindu-Sikh identity. It was not until a Lahore meeting in 1897 that the Sanatanist Hindu faction passed a resolution proclaiming Sikhs as Hindus, a matter that then acquired legal significance with Sardar Dyal Singh Majithia's death in 1898.

===== Samajist =====
Following the founding and spread of its educational movement in Punjab and beyond in 1883, Arya Samaj publications also assailed other faiths, including Christianity, Islam, Jainism, and Buddhism, exacerbating entrenched communal faultlines with its odium theologicum. Ganda Singh in fact considered the "Hindu-Sikh tension" of subsequent times to have been a recent misnomer as of 1961, and that it had more accurately originated as the Sikh-Arya Samaj tension.

The initial Samajist impact on the Hindu community was divisive, pitting militants against the orthodox; the Sanatanist and Samajist factions would only begin to reconcile on shuddhi and increase cooperation under the Hindu Mahasabha in the 1920s, first with tacit and increasing approval from pandits of shuddhi, the "ārya bhāṣā" Hindi, the "ved bhāṣā" Sanskrit, and Samaji reforms. According to Ganga Prasad Upadhyaya in 1939, "Forty years ago the Arya Samaj was looked upon as a great defiler of the Hindu religion by bringing in an alloy from outside. Today the Arya Samajist is counted as a great defender of the faith." Based on their common view of Vedas, the Arya Samaj would be eventually absorbed into pan-Hindu revivalist framework; the forces of Hindu communalism resulting from this blend, with a modernised identity based on a reinterpreted tradition, would export its techniques to the rest of India; this attempt to create a new, modernised, respectable religious tradition would change relations with other communities in Punjab.

Its criticism of both modern Hinduism and Sikhism as polytheistic corruption (including instances of Arya Samaj members smashing and trampling idols in other Hindu temples, and Dayanand writing in 1883 that "while it was true that [Sikhs] do not practise idolatry," he saw the Sikh reverence of the Guru Granth Sahib as tantamount to such) treatment of Sikhs as a Hindu sect (despite calling on its membership to identify as "Aryas" and not degraded "Hindus" during the 1891 census, on account of its Persian etymology), meddling in Sikh affairs (including attempts to keep the mahants' idols within the Darbar Sahib despite its own iconoclasm and denunciation of idolatry), and attempts to "purify" Sikhs back to what Arya Samaj called as the "monotheistic Vedic Hinduism," based solely on the infallibility of the Vedas, found little acceptance among Sikhs and had a major impact in Punjab.

Apart from Sikhs, the compulsion to spread the "Hindu" identity to lower castes as well, in shuddhi "purifications," had also been motivated by political concerns, when the registering of Dalits as non-Hindu would have rendered caste "Hindus" a minority. It was seen as a way to boost the demographics of a projected "Hindu" community.

==== Sikh ====
In contrast, in Sikh scripture (tīsar panth), 16th-century exegesis (Bhai Gurdas) and pre-colonial 19th-century commentaries (the tisra mazhab of Kavi Santokh Singh, whose Nirmala incorporation of some Vedantic themes would, however, help give rise to sanatan interpretations later that century), older janamsakhis (B-40), Qazi Nur Muhammad's 18th-century Afghan jangnama, and 17th-century Persian sources (Dabestan-e Mazaheb), there is clear evidence of an established sense of identity among the Sikh community, from both within and without, distinct from the "Hindu" and "Turk" (Islam) panths, well before colonial times.

The crystallisation of Sikh identity in relation to nascent "Hinduism" and subsequent Sikh apprehensions in the Indian state are traceable to the Arya Samaj attacks and attempts to subsume Sikhism, using a combination of persuasion and ideological attack. Sikh coordination against the antagonism of the Arya Samaj, and the nature and character of the Singh Sabha's modernising zeal, was largely a response to the transformation of the original term Hindu which meant "non-Muslim inhabitant of India" to a term that embodied those who identified with this new "Hinduism." The Chief Khalsa Diwan sought to coordinate a political response and protect the Sikh identity from being viewed as "tiny sect within a broader pan-Hinduism".

== Further developments ==
=== Chief Khalsa Diwan (CKD) ===
In the 1890s, Sikhs groups formed many Khalsa Diwans in towns and cities, while rural groups formed their own Sikh Sabhas. By 1902, there were over 150 Singh Sabhas and Khalsa Diwans in existence. Another attempt brought 29 of these Khalsa Diwans and other Sikh societies under the Chief Khalsa Diwan, or CKD, partly due to the need for greater political coordination in the face a far more powerful common adversary, the Arya Samaj, by now the main representative of political Hinduism in Punjab. This body would be created in 1902 to unite the Lahore and Amritsar Singh Sabhas with their respective satellite Singh Sabhas, and would act as the main voice of the Sikhs for the next 18 years. A lack of coordination between the local Singh Sabhas and larger Khalsa Diwans, compared to municipal committees and district boards, had been noted in the Khalsa Samachar newspaper, and was to be ameliorated by the CKD.

According to J.S. Grewal, while there were disagreements, the Singh Sabhas and Diwans were all concerned with religious reform and to collectively addressing the growing threat from Christian missionaries who were converting Sikhs into Christians, after the much-publicised celebrity conversions earlier such as of Maharaja Dalip Singh and Kanwar Harnam Singh Ahluwalia. Sikh publications by the various Sikh Sabhas expressed their fear for the Sikh identity in early 20th-century given the success of the Christian missionaries, as well the rising threat of Muslim and Arya Samaj proselytisation efforts. The Sikh leaders were concerned about Christian missionary schools targeting the Sikh youth. They welcomed the English language education but opposed the Christian theology that was also being taught in these schools.

The Chief Khalsa Diwan was officially registered and recognised by the colonial British government on July 9, 1904. The new body was financially supported by the affiliated Singh Sabhas, and Sikh aristocrats. It also attracted dedicated Sikh preachers or Updeshak. By 1920, the Chief Khalsa Diwan oversaw 105 affiliates. It developed an elaborate structure with the Chief Khalsa Diwan having three types of advisors and various committees, all paid a monthly salary from dues collected from the affiliates and members. While Sikh newspapers championed the Chief Khalsa Diwan and the British colonial government recognised it as representing the entire Sikh community and all the Sikh Sabhas, in late 1900s and throughout 1910s significant internal disagreements led important Sikh activists to challenge the authority of the Chief Diwan Khalsa. The Amritsar faction, who still exerted administrative dominance amid predominant Tat Khalsa strength, and growing unease over its own conservative stance, were concerned with staying on good terms with the British, who anxiously wanted to uphold the validity of their settlement instated at the beginning of their administration of the Punjab in 1849, in which ownership of gurdwaras was conferred upon whoever could claim it. In late 1920, Sikh revolutionaries, irritated at the loyal obedience of the CKD to the British, would announce two decisions at the Akal Takht reached by the newly formed Central Sikh League: the formation of the SGPC to manage all Sikh shrines, and the formation of the Akali Dal. The CKD would be overtaken by the more activist Akali movement, led by the Akali Dal, which would train men to confront the government and reclaim gurdwaras.

=== Akali movement ===
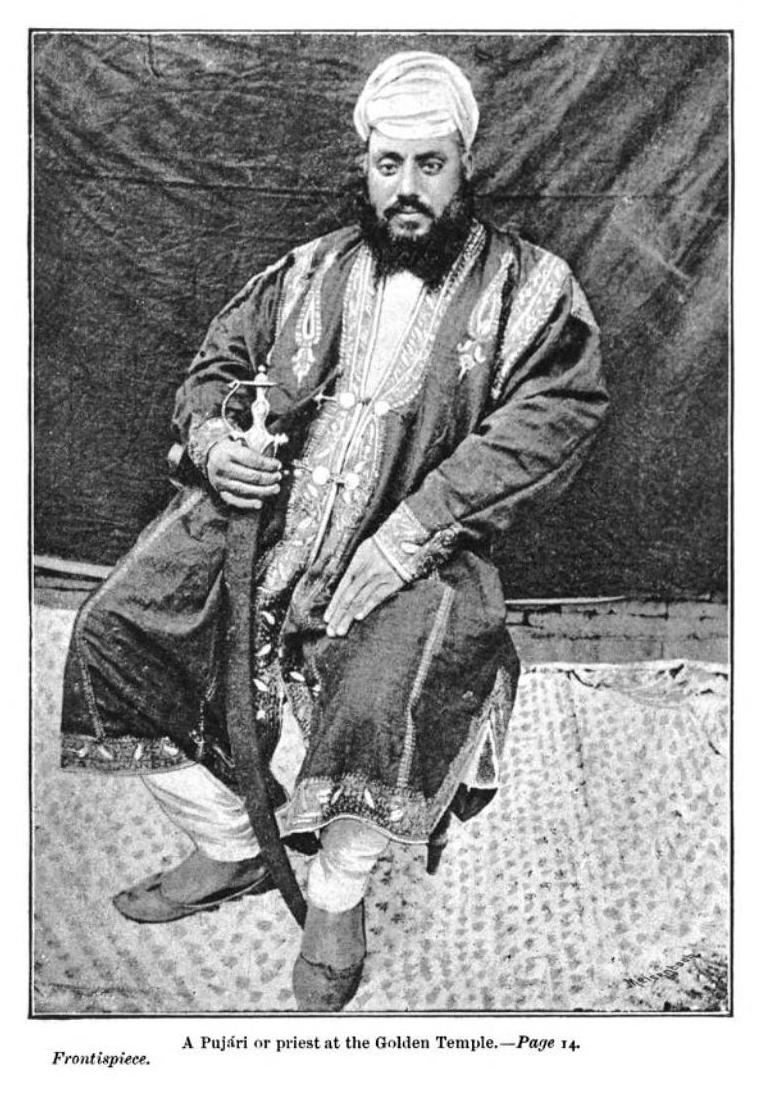
Seated photograph of a pujari or priest at the Golden Temple complex in Amritsar, Punjab, ca.1889

In the early decades of the 20th century, the Tat Khalsa, through the Akali movement, also contributed to two major legal victories, the 1909 Anand Marriage Act, and the Sikh gurdwaras Act, 1925, which re-established direct Khalsa control of the major historical gurdwaras, previously run by British-supported mahants and pujaris, or Hindu priests, and their rites. The reestablishment of Sikh control of gurdwaras, after the non-violent Akali Movement, also known as the gurdwara Reform Movement, was touched off in 1920 following General Reginald Dyer’s invited visit to the Golden Temple failed to pacify the Sikhs. The Akali Movement, lasting from 1920 to 1925, culminated in the transfer of gurdwara control to the Shiromani gurdwara Parbandhak Committee (SGPC); the Akali Movement is the forerunner of the modern Akali Dal political party. In 1919, the internal disagreements led some Sikh leaders to form the Central Sikh League, while in 1920 the Shiromani gurdwara Prabandhak Committee, or SGPC, emerged for the same reasons.

In 1932, a general meeting of the Sikhs formed the Khalsa Darbar as an attempt to form a united front triggered by the colonial British government's Communal Award of seats to the Punjab Legislative Council. The Central Sikh League formed in 1919 merged into the Khalsa Darbar. However, in 1937, the Sikhs split into Shiromani Akali Dal and Congressite Sikhs. The Singh Sabhas of the late 19th-century were overwhelmed by these organisations as Britain attempted to gain Indian soldiers for their World War II efforts and from the dynamics of religion-based political partition of the Indian subcontinent in the final decades of colonial rule. The SGPC, as a democratic institution, has represented the majority opinion of Sikhs, and is the authoritative voice of the Sikhs.

== Women and the Singh Sabha movement ==
The Singh Sabha reformists promoted a framework for Sikh women to aspire to that was not very different from what the Arya Samaj or Brahmos promoted, consisting of progressiveness due to emancipation but also being constrainted by Victorian-era social-norms. Women's popular-culture was seen as a threat to the idealised image of a Sikh woman. To the reformers, the ideal Sikh woman was one who was devoted to her husband and the family, was not superstitous, dressed modestly, wore minimal jewelry, and had knowledge of her religion so she could pass it on to her children. Women were supposed to not sing sitthnias (a traditional marriage practice where the bride's side mocks the groom's side, exposes their faults, and their errors), perform siapa, mourn by beating their chest, and avoid some other rituals deemed contrary to the reformers' envisionment of womanhood. The title Kaur was promoted and standardised for Sikh women to uptake as part of their name rather than the commonly used Devi or Bai.

In-contrast to the ideal Sikh woman, the "depraved" woman (known as a kapatti by the reformers) was one who was married into a respectable Sikh family yet still maintained beliefs and practices rooted in Punjabi folk religion (which was seen as superstition by the reformers), or were quarrelsome, superstitious, lazy, or gluttonous.

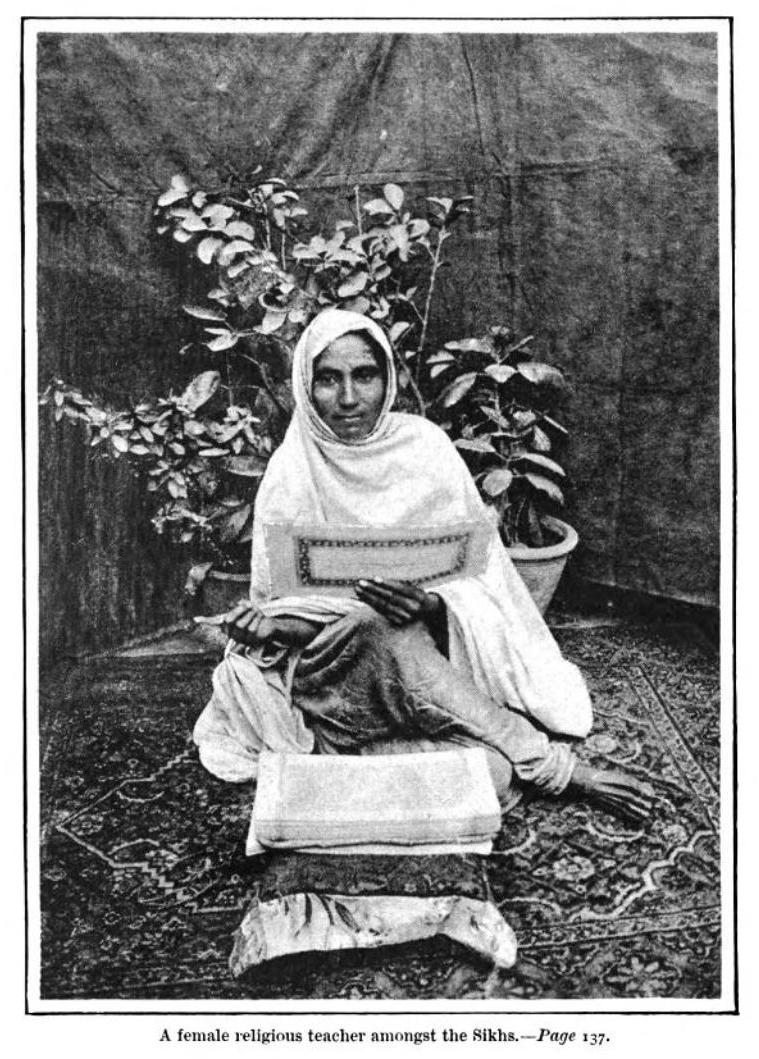
Photograph of Bibi Devki of Jhang, a woman-preacher of the Singh Sabha movement, published in 'None of Self and All of Thee, A Table of Indian Life' (1889)

One of the first Sikh woman-preacher of the movement was Bibi Devki of Jhang, daughter of Chetan Shah of Jhang. In November 1886, she published a piece of literature, namely Kumatt Kaur te Sumatt Kaur, modelled after an Urdu tract geared toward Muslim women named Mirat-ul-Uroos, which showcases the story of a "kapatti" Sikh woman named Kumatt Kaur, who is lazy, kills ants, and fights with her mother-in-law. In-contrast, Sumatt Kaur, Kumatt Kaur's friend, embodies all the values of a "good" Sikh woman as defined by the reformers. In the text, a visit to the shrine of Heer proposed by Kumatt Kaur is refuted by Sumatt Kaur as being against Sikh dharam. Throughout the story, Kumatt Kaur, the "bad" Sikh woman, is juxtaposed by Sumatt Kaur, the "good" one, until eventually Sumatt Kaur's influence gradually turns Kumatt Kaur into an ideal Sikh woman.

In the Punjabi novels Sundari (1898), Bijay Singh (1899), and Satwant Kaur (two parts published in 1900 and 1927) by Vir Singh, an image of an ideal Sikh woman is portrayed. Specifically in Sundari, set in the 18th century, a Hindu Khatri girl character named Surasti is abducted by a Muslim man and saved by her Khalsa brother, with her dedicating herself to the Khalsa thereafter. The Khalsa Tract Society founded by Vir Singh published many pamphlets outlining what an ideal upper-class and middle-class urban Sikh woman should be to formalise and unify Sikh feminity, which had been fluid and ambiguous along religious boundaries prior. This was done by attempting to manage women's bodies and practices. An ideal Sikh woman in those works was devoted to their husband (patibrata), had knowledge of modern medicine, hygiene, anatomy, and reproduction, but also was versed in Sikh history, practices, and marriage. They were also urged to manage their own households, work which had been previously done by Muslim or low-caste servants. One Khalsa Tract Society pamphlet stated:

Keep your [women's] body clean and your behaviour chaste. Always obey your husband and know your happiness as his happiness and his happiness as yours. Raise your children. But not out of foolish love, but out of compassion.

— Khalsa Tract Society (1911), Ghar wich Surg arthat Grihasth wich Sukh Kikur Maanida hai ("Heaven inside home, meaning how to be happy within domestic life"), translated by Arora (2022, p. 103)

To improve women's knowledge on modern medicine, anatomy (such as pregnancy), and science, Mohan Singh Vaid (1881–1936) founded the Swadesh Bhasha Pracharak Ladi, which translated works covering these subjects into the local vernacular in the form of pamphlets and books and promoted celibacy before marriage and restraint within marriage. The Sikh Kanya Mahavidyalaya (1892–1947) was founded to provide Sikh girls a modern education on the subjects of women's anatomy, English, history, and Gurmat to prepare them to become ideal future mothers. It also published the first Sikh woman magazine Punjabi Bhain (1907–1912) which published many articles on women's reproductive health. The women's movement in India arose in the 1920s, with women taking a more active role in social movements and regulation against child marriage being passed. In the Phulwari magazine (est. 1924), educated women authors (such as Jiwan Kaur, Tej Kaur, Amar Kaur, and Lakhmir Kaur) wrote on various topics and a special women's edition was issued in July 1937, known as the Nari Number, which discussed women's legal rights, such as to divorce and their engagement in politics.

== Perspectives ==
While W. H. McLeod considers the dominance of the Khalsa identity to last well into the 19th century, Harjot Oberoi sees the emergence of a "Sanatan Sikh tradition" that displaced the eighteenth-century "Khalsa episteme."

According to Oberoi, the first Singh Sabha formed in 1873 aimed at interreligious tolerance and cooperation between Sikhs and Hindus. With the arrival of Arya Samaj in 1877 and its criticism of Sikhism, the dynamics changed. According to the Indologist T.N. Madan, Sikhs and Hindus not only lived together before 1870s, they shared a common cultural life with common symbols and orientations. The Arya Samaj activity and the Singh Sabha movement's response to it created several competing definitions of Sikh identity. After the early struggles within the Singh Sabha movement, new social and cultural elites emerged. These, states Oberoi, displaced preceding Sikh ties, replaced them with a "series of inventions: the demarcation of Sikh sacred space by clearing holy shrines of Hindu icons and idols, the cultivation of Punjabi as the sacred language of the Sikhs, the foundation of cultural bodies exclusively for Sikh youth, the insertion of the anniversaries of the Sikh Gurus into the ritual and sacred calendar and most important of all, the introduction of new life-cycle rituals".

However, while Harpreet Singh cites "perhaps, the best critique of Oberoi's work" by Cynthia Mahmood, that Oberoi completely omits the role of the period of Sikh persecution and religious conflict in the development of a heightened sense of Sikh religious identity, Oberoi does in fact concede that older Sikh exegeses "are not completely unaware of boundaries." according to W. H. McLeod, Oberoi's mentor, there is scriptural support from the writing of both Guru Arjan and Bhai Gurdas that a strong sense of identity had already come to exist by the sixteenth century, matching a "reasonable expectation that the intellectual elite within the Panth moved more rapidly towards a sense of distinct identity than did the body of believers," and that "[t]he 'boundaries' might be indistinct but not the 'centre'," with a lag of various degrees between the panth's elites and its masses during the preceding century. Neither the fluidity and diversity of the 18th century preclude a strong identity, nor was uniformity required for it, according to J. S. Grewal.

Harnik Deol states that Oberoi's analysis may be termed as the "hegemony approach," which seeks to explain how the rising middle class used religious reform to gain cultural hegemony by gaining control over sacred centres and by defining a uniform, undifferentiated religious discourse with discrete boundaries. According to Oberoi, this new class of leadership provided the Sikhs with a distinct and separate Sikh identity with a standardised history, rites of passage, sacred space and observances, though he fails to explain what was new about this message or innovative about the Sikh initiation ritual, as "iconoclastic monotheism and egalitarian social values" had been the exact teachings of the Sikh gurus. This is only a partial understanding of the impact of the Singh Sabha movement, done by stripping the Sikh initiation of its deeper, symbolic significance, and reducing it "merely to its overt function as an ethnic marker," and Deol considers Oberoi's analysis to contradict his own earlier observations, as he himself states that the Khalsa had already established their distinct rites of passage, birth, death and initiation by the 18th century. In reference to the religious and moral codes a true Khalsa must follow that were established by Guru Gobind Singh, it is the rigor and difficulty in living up to these codes, says Deol, that is the reason why only a small fractional percentage of Sikhs undergo the initiation rite even today.

According to Pashaura Singh, while some Sikhs embraced Hindu practices in the 19th century, "it is questionable whether this was always so," and "to imply that Sikh identity was always predominantly fluid, with free mixing of Sikh and Hindu practices," is questionable. Harpreet Singh also contends that while "the existence of the aforementioned rahit and well-defined boundaries does not mean that individual Sikhs never engaged in practices that were proscribed by the normative tradition," "not every practice performed by a Sikh becomes Sikhism." From as early as the period of Guru Arjan, Sikhs "clearly were encouraged to think of themselves as a new community." The Singh Sabha movement had many shades of views. The Amritsar Singh Sabha's Khem Singh Bedi saw Sikh identity as distinct, the need for a living guru, supported the idea of them being divine incarnations, and the idea that "Hindus and Sikhs were indivisible" as a society. The Lahore Singh Sabha's Gurmukh Singh held the middle ground stating that Sikhs had their own distinct scripture and practices, the issue of Sikh-Hindu relationship was redundant, and that all those who accepted Sikh scripture were Sikhs whether they undergo Khalsa initiation and live by its religious code or those who do not undergo initiation and do not follow some of the Sikh religious and moral codes. The Bhasaur Singh Sabha's Teja Singh represented the more radical view during this movement with the view that those who have not undergone Khalsa initiation should have "no place in the Sikh panth", and to speak of Hindu-Sikh relationship is to insult Sikhism. Eventually, the middle ground view of Gurmukh Singh prevailed.

According to W. H. McLeod, the Singh Sabha "systematised and clarified" the Khalsa tradition, but Khalsa identity was neither a totally new invention, nor mere purging of "alien excrescence," nor the "restoration of a corrupted original.' The Khalsa identity of the Singh Sabha reformers contained both "old and new" elements, quotes Pashaura Singh. According to Barrier and Singh, "On the theological plane, modern Sikhism is a continuation of the Singh Sabha restoration. While it retains its creedal unity and its adherence to its original metaphysics and symbolism, it has found enough resilience in the framework it has inherited to adapt itself to the modern course of progress without compromising on the fundamentals. Deeply conscious of its eventful history, its outlook is essentially forward-looking."

== List of Singh Sabhas ==
A list of 117 Singh Sabhas established between 1873 and 1900 was recorded by Harjot Oberoi is as follows (with additions to the base list as per references):

List of Singh Sabhas founded between 1873 and 1900 (with additions) (Note: Singh Sabhas established outside of the Indian subcontinent are shaded.)
No.	Location	Date of establishment (if known)
1	Amritsar	1873
2	Lahore	1879
3	Sarkar (Jalandhar district)	
4	Sohana	1900
5	Lyallpur	1898
6	Saharanpur	
7	Sadhora (Ambala district)	
8	Singhpura (Gurdaspur district)	
9	Sohla (Amritsar district)	
10	Harpalpur (Patiala state)	
11	Kapurthala	
12	Kulim (Malaysia)	
13	Kidaha (Malaysia)	
14	Khemkaran (Lahore district)	
15	Gurdaspur	
16	Chakwal (Jhelam district)	
17	Tarn Taran (Amritsar district)	
18	Bhagowal (Gujrat district)	
19	Muktsar (Ferozepore district)	
20	Randhawa (Sialkot district)	
21	Lucknow	
22	Panjkora (Ambala district)	1893
23	Ludhiana	1884
24	Sunam (Patiala state)	
25	Hargobindpur	
26	Kahuta (Rawalpindi district)	1899
27	Sukho (Rawalpindi district)	
28	Datta Khel	1899
29	Biaul (Rawalpindi district)	1899
30	Quetta	1890
31	Gharauan (Patiala state)	
32	Bilga (Jalandhar district)	
33	Sikhwala (Ferozepore district)	
34	Bagumajra (Ambala district)	1900
35	Wazirabad	1891
36	Saranda (Malaysia)	
37	Sahiwal	
38	Jalandhar	
39	Jhelam	1892
40	Nararu (Patiala State)	
41	Dadan Khan	
42	Darul (Patiala state)	
43	Ponch (Poonch territory)	
44	Ferozepore	1884
45	Bagrian (Ludhiana district)	
46	Dipalpur (Montgomery district)	
47	Kasuli	1894
48	Sivi	1896
49	Tatla (Gujranwala district)	1896
50	Delhi	1896
51	Karnal	1896
52	Sangrur	
53	Jacobabad	1897
54	Maumnabad	1898
55	Bhawalpur	
56	Dagshahi	
57	Bhaun (Jhelam district)	1898
58	Peshawar	1892
59	Morinda (Ambala district)	1898
60	Bishnadaur (Jhelam district)	1898
61	Ghanuri (Patiala state)	
62	Gujjarkhan (Rawalpindi district)	
63	Hong Kong	
64	Sayyidwala (Montgomery district)	
65	Kakkarval (Patiala state)	
66	Dinga (Gujrat district)	
67	Kohat	1887
68	Montgomery	1891
69	Dera Khalsa (Rawalpindi district)	
70	Dhariwal	1895
71	Nago Ke (Amritsar district)	
72	Agra	1895
73	Budala	1895
74	Gilgit	
75	Sri Nagar	
76	Dhoitian (Amritsar district)	
77	Penang (Malaysia)	
78	Sabathu	1895
79	Chupal	1894
80	Mehraj (Ferozepore district)	
81	Ghila (Rawalpindi district)	1895
82	Mahendargarh (Patiala state)	1895
83	Gujranwala (Ludhiana district)	1885
84	Kaluwal (Sialkot district)	1896
85	Badowal (Ludhiana district)	1896
86	Multan cantonment	
87	Jind	1896
88	Ambala cantonment	1890
89	Sabathu	
90	Timawal	
91	Jandraka (Montgomery district)	1896
92	Daudpura	1886
93	Ajmer	
94	Khumano	
95	Chamkaur Sahib	1887
96	Jhansi	
97	Kalka	
98	Lidhran	
99	Maghiana	
100	Saludi	
101	Tiska	1888
102	Rangoon	
103	Hoshyarpur	1886
104	Rupar	
105	Sakhar	
106	Jaunpur	
107	Nadrai	
108	Sialkot	1884
109	Mode	1886
110	Khanna	
111	Bhinder	1886
112	Simla	1885
113	Rawalpindi	1883
114	Faridkot	
115	Jhang	1885
116	Dera Baba Nanak	1885
117	Ramnagar	1892
118	Shanghai	before 1900
119	Singapore	25 June 1918

== Bibliography ==
- Deol, Harnik (2000). Religion and Nationalism in India: The Case of the Punjab (Routledge Studies in the Modern History of Asia) (1st ed.). New York City, U.S.A.: Routledge. pp. 65–78. ISBN 978-0415201087.
- Gandhi, Surjit Singh (1993). "Genesic Roots". Perspectives on Sikh Gurdwaras Legislation. Atlantic Publishers & Dist. pp. 1–47. ISBN 978-81-7156-371-5.
- Sarhadi, Ajit Singh (1970). "The Sikh Resurgence and the Emergence of the Akali Dal". Punjabi Suba: The Story of the Struggle. Delhi: U. C. Kapur and Sons. pp. 1–29.
- Barrier, N. Gerald; Siṅgh, Nazer (2004). "Siṅgh Sabhā Movement". In Siṅgh, Harbans (ed.). Encyclopedia of Sikhism. Vol. IV (S–Z) (2nd ed.). Patiala: Punjab University. pp. 205–212. ISBN 9788173805301.
- Oberoi, Harjot (1994). The Construction of religious boundaries: culture, identity, and diversity in the Sikh tradition. University of Chicago Press. ISBN 978-0-226-61593-6.
- Singh, Gurdarshan (1989). "The Singh Sabha Movement". In Singh, Mohinder (ed.). History and Culture of Panjab. New Delhi: Atlantic Publishers and Distributors. pp. 95–104. ISBN 9788171560783.
- Mandair, Arvind-Pal Singh (2013). Sikhism: A Guide for the Perplexed. Bloomsbury Academic. pp. 78–86. ISBN 978-1-4411-0231-7.
- Singh, Pashaura; Fenech, Louis E. (2014). The Oxford Handbook of Sikh Studies. Oxford University Press. pp. 28–31. ISBN 978-0-19-969930-8.
- Grewal, J. S. (1997). Historical perspectives on Sikh identity. Publication Bureau, Punjab University Patiala. ISBN 9788173803598.
- Grewal, J. S. (2011). History, Literature, and Identity: Four Centuries of Sikh Tradition. Oxford University Press. ISBN 9780199080427.
- Singh, Ganda (April 1961). "The Origin of the Hindu-Sikh Tension in Punjab". The Journal of Indian History. 39 (1): 119–123.
- Jones, Kenneth W. (November 1968). "Communalism in the Punjab: The Arya Samaj Contribution". The Journal of Asian Studies. 28 (1). Duke University Press: 39–54. doi:10.2307/2942838. JSTOR 2942838.
- Jones, Kenneth W. (May 1973). "Ham Hindū Nahīn: Arya-Sikh Relations, 1877-1905". The Journal of Asian Studies. 32 (3). Duke University Press: 457–475. doi:10.2307/2052684. JSTOR 2052684. S2CID 163885354.
- Singh, Harbans (1964). "Reorientation". The Heritage Of The Sikhs. New York: Asia Publishing House. pp. 138–147. ISBN 9780836410068.
