= Khatri =

Caste in South Asia

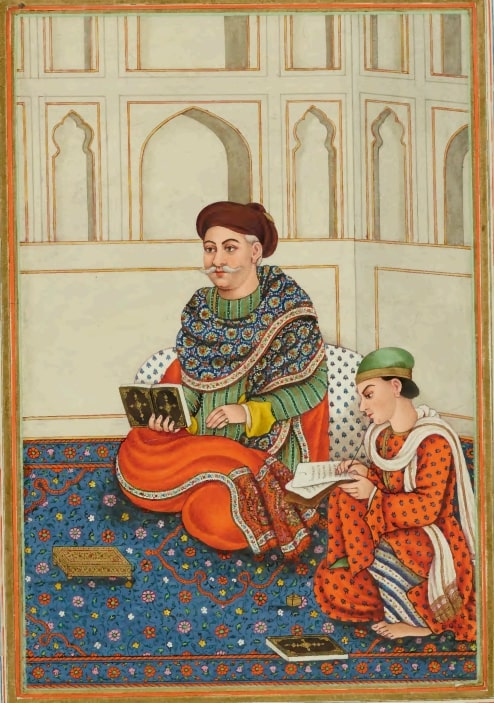
- Khatri nobleman in Kitab-i Tasrih al-Aqvam by James Skinner (1778–1841)
- Religions: Majority: Hinduism; Minority: Sikhism, Islam
- Languages: Major: Punjabi, Potohari, Hindko, (Multani/Saraiki); Minor: Hindi, Gujarati, Dogri, Kangri, Sindhi, Pashto, Urdu, Kutchi
- Country: India, Pakistan and Afghanistan
- Region: Punjab, Sindh, Delhi, Jammu and Kashmir, Himachal Pradesh, Haryana, Gujarat, Maharashtra, Uttar Pradesh

Khatri (IPA: [kʰət̪ɾiː]) is a caste originating from the Malwa and Majha areas of Punjab region of South Asia that is predominantly found in India, and in small numbers in Pakistan. In the Indian subcontinent, they were mostly engaged in mercantile professions such as banking and trade. In late-medieval India they were the dominant commercial and financial class, while in Punjab some were hereditary landholding agriculturalists and others worked as artisans, such as silk weavers.

The Khatris of Punjab, specifically, were scribes and traders during the medieval period, with the Gurmukhi script used in writing the Punjabi language deriving from a standardised form of the Lāṇḍa script used by Khatri traders; the invention of the script is traditionally ascribed to Guru Angad. During the medieval period, with the rise of Persian as an elite vernacular due to Islamic rule, some of the traditional high status General caste literate elite such as the Khatris, Kashmiri Brahmins and Kayasthas took readily to learning Persian from the times of Sikandar Lodi onwards and found ready employment in the Imperial Services, specifically in the departments of accountancy (siyaq), draftsmanship (insha) and offices of the revenue minister (diwan).

In the 15th century, Sikhism was founded by Guru Nanak, a Bedi Khatri. The second guru, Guru Angad was a Trehan Khatri. The third guru, Guru Amar Das was a Bhalla Khatri. The fourth through tenth gurus were all Sodhi Khatris. In the Sikh Empire, many Khatris formed the military vanguard of the Khalsa Army and its administrative class as Dewans of several provinces. Hari Singh Nalwa, the commander-in-chief of the Sikh Khalsa Army, was an Uppal Khatri and responsible for most of the Sikh conquests up until the Khyber Pass. Others such as Mohkam Chand commanded the Sikh Army against the Durrani Empire at Attock while those such as Sawan Mal ruled Multan after wrestling it from the Afghans.

== Etymology ==
Scholars, including W. H. McLeod and Louis Fenech, Peter Hardy, and A. R. Desai agree that the Punjabi term Khattrī has its origin in the Sanskrit Kṣatriya, not particularly surprising as Punjabi evolved from Old Indo-Aryan through intermediate stages of Middle Indo-Aryan and Apabhraṃśa, making it a descendant of the Sanskrit lineage. The Shabda-Sāgara, a Sanskrit–English lexicon, also supports this etymology, stating “the word Khattrī – used for the caste of Hindus from Punjab – derives from the Sanskrit Kṣatriya, with the female member being a Khatrānī (Skt. Kṣatrāṇī).”

Dr. Dharamvir Bharati comments that in Punjabi language, Kṣatriya is pronounced as Khattrī. As per Dr. G. S Mansukhani and R. C. Dogra, "Khatri appears to be unquestionably a Prakritised form of Sanskrit word Kshatriya." According to the philologist Ralph Lilley Turner, in his etymological Dictionary of the Indo-Aryan Lexicon, it is the Punjabi word "khattrī", meaning "warrior", derived from Sanskrit "kṣatriya", whereas another Gujarati word "khātrī", meaning "a caste of Hindu weavers", derives from Sanskrit "kṣattr̥", meaning "carver, distributor, attendant, doorkeeper, charioteer, son of a female slave".

John Stratton Hawley and Mann clarify the word Khatri derives from the Sanskrit Kshatriya, in Punjab's context Khatri refers to a "cluster of merchant castes including Bedis, Bhallas and Sodhis". Purnima Dhavan sees the claim as originating from a conflation of the phonetically similar words Khatri and Kshatriya, but refers to Khatris as a "trading caste" of the Sikh Gurus.

== History ==
=== Early modern era ===
Emperor Jahangir in his autobiography Jahangirnama while talking about the castes observed "The second highest caste (after Brahmins in the caste system) is the Chhatri which is also known as Khattri. The Chhatri caste's purpose is to protect the oppressed from the aggression of the oppressors".

==== Punjab ====
Historian Muzaffar Alam describes the Khatris of Punjab as a "scribe and trading caste". They occupied positions in revenue collection and record keeping and learnt Persian during Mughal era. However, this profession often created conflicts with the Brahmin scribes who discontinued the use of Persian and started using Marathi in the Deccan districts of the Mughal Empire. Because the Khatris were not only scribes but also merchants and traders, by the 1700s (but likely earlier) they dominated trade in Punjab, Afghanistan, and many parts of India. This complete domination by the eighteenth century has led some historians to hypothesize that the Khatris may have been present in Bengal before the Mughals arrived in 1576.

According to a 17th-century legend, Khatris continued their military service until the time of Aurangzeb, when their mass death during the emperor's Deccan Campaign caused him to order their widows to be remarried. The order was made out of sympathy for the widows but when the Khatri community leaders refused to obey it, Aurangzeb terminated their military service and said they should be shopkeepers and brokers. This legend is probably fanciful: McLane notes a more likely explanation for their revised position was that a Sikh rebellion against the Mughals in the early 1700s severely compromised the Khatri's ability to trade and forced them to take sides. Those who were primarily dependent on the Mughals went to significant lengths to assert that allegiance in the face of accusations they were in fact favouring "Jat Sikh followers of the rebel leader Banda". The outcome of their assertions - which included providing financial support to the Mughals and shaving their beards - was that the Khatris became still more important to the Mughal rulers as administrators at various levels, in particular because of their skills in financial management and their connections with bankers.

Khatri standards of literacy and caste status were such during the early years of Sikhism that, according to W. H. McLeod, they dominated it.

==== Kashmir ====
Sukh Jiwan Mal, a Dewan of Ahmad Shah Durrani, was a Khatri officer from Bhera. He liberated Kashmir from Afghan dominancy in 1754 and ratified his control over the valley by assuming his duties as a Raja. Mal was subsequently defeated in 1762 by Nur-ud-Din Bamzai, a general deputed by Durrani himself.

==== Bengal ====
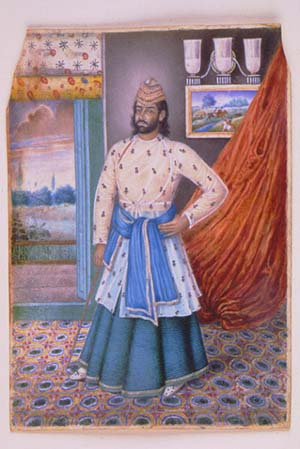
Mehtab Chand of Burdwan, c. 1860-65

In Bengal, Burdwan Raj (1657–1955) was a Khatri dynasty, which gained a high social position for Khatris in the region resulting in the increased migration of Khatris from Punjab to Bengal. When Guru Tegh Bahadur visited Bengal in 1666, he was welcomed by the local Khatris, thereby supporting earlier waves of migration of Khatris to Bengal as well.

==== Trans-regional trading history ====
The Khatris, as a part of the diaspora community known as Multani or Shikarpuri, played an important role in India's trans-regional trade during the period, being described by Levi as among the "most important merchant communities of early modern India." Levi writes: "Stephen Dale locates Khatris in Astrakhan, Russia during the late 17th century and, in the 1830s, Elphinstone, was informed that Khatris were still highly involved in northwest India's trade and that they maintained communities throughout Afghanistan and as far away as Astrakhan". According to Kiran Datar, they often married Tatar local women in Astrakhan and the children from these marriages were known as Agrijan. As per Stephen Dale, the children born out of Indo-Turkic alliance were in sufficient number to form an Agrizhan suburb in the city.

Dale states most of the 10,000 (as estimated by Jean Chardin) Indian merchants and money-lenders in Isfahan (Iran) in 1670, belonged to the Khatri caste of Punjab and north-west India. In Iran's Bazaars, Khatris sold cloth and various items and also practised money-lending. Dale believes Khatris had possibly been travelling from Punjab via caravans since the era of Ziauddin Barani (around 1300 AD). Chardin specifically stereotyped and expressed disapproval of the money-lending techniques of the Khatri community. According to Dale, this racist criticism was ironic given Chardin's non-English background but adds it was Chardin's way of giving an "ethnic explanation" to the economic disparity between Iran and India at that time.

==== Afghanistan ====
According to historians Roger Ballard and Harjot Oberoi, Afghan Hindus and Sikhs descend from the members of the country's indigenous Khatri population who resisted the conversion from Buddhism to Islam between 9th and 13th centuries. Later, they aligned themselves to the teachings of Guru Nanak, himself a Khatri and converted to Sikhism. Hence, Khatris of Afghanistan are in no way of "Indian origin" but are components of the original population of the region. George Campbell says "I do not know the exact limits of Khatri occupation to the West, but certainly in all Eastern Afghanistan they seem to be just as much part of the community as they are in the Punjab. They find their way into Central Asia."

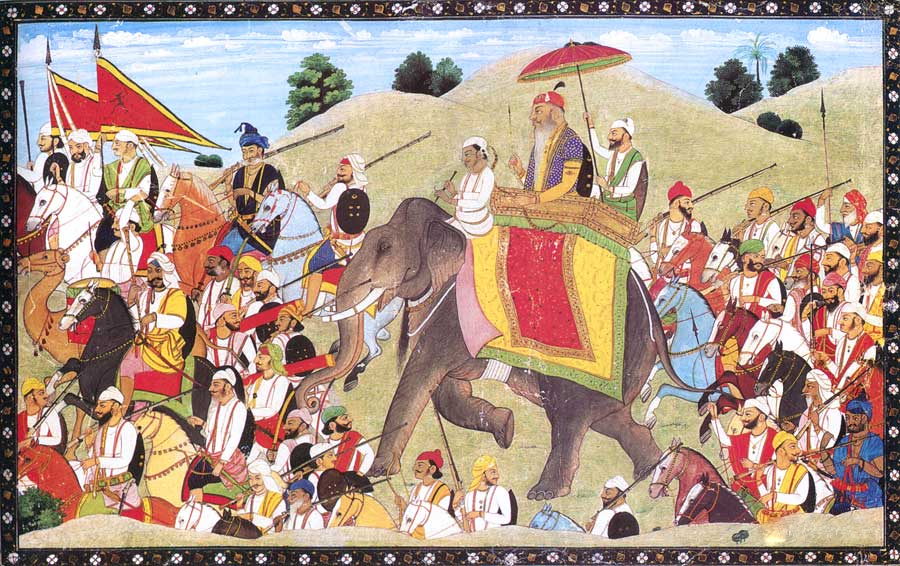
ca. 19th century, paint on paper A military procession of Hari Singh Nalwa (1791–1837), one of the greatest generals of the Sikh Empire. The military procession depicted is led by two horsemen carrying battle standards

==== Sikh Empire ====
Sardar Gulab Singh Khatri founded the Dallewallia Misl, an independent 18th century Sikh sovereign state in Ludhiana and Jalandhar districts that would be later on conquered by Maharaja Ranjit Singh. Purnima Dhawan described that together with Jat community, the Khatris gained considerably from the expansion of the Mughal empire, although both groups supported Guru Hargobind in his campaign for Sikh self-government in the Punjab plains.

According to the Khalsa Darbar records, most of Maharaja Ranjit Singh's army was composed of Jats followed by Khatris. In the Sikh Empire, Hari Singh Nalwa (1791–1837), an Uppal Khatri from Gujranwala, became a commander of the Sikh Khalsa Army. He was responsible for expanding the frontier of Sikh Empire to beyond the Indus River, up to the mouth of the Khyber Pass. Mohkam Chand (1750–1814) also became a distinguished leader of the Khalsa Army. He was the commander in Battle of Attock which defeated Durrani Wazir Fateh Khan and Dost Mohammad Khan. His son Moti Ram and grandson Kirpa Ram were governors of Kashmir.

Another Khatri Sawan Mal served as governor of Multan, while his son Mulraj Chopra (1814–1851), the last Punjabi ruler of Multan led a rebellion against the British in the siege of Multan. He was arrested after the fall of Multan and was exiled.

=== British colonial era ===
In Punjab, they were moneylenders, shopkeepers and grain-dealers among other professions. A Peshawari Khatri family in Hyderabad State would become part of the Hyderabadi nobility and occupy the post of Prime Minister of Hyderabad. Notable individuals of the family include Maharaja Kishen Prasad, GCIE who would serve as Prime Minister of the State twice. In Hyderabad, around the mid-20th century, Khatris and Padmasalis were the leading "Hindu weaving castes" who owned 43% of the looms. The Khatris specialised in silk, while the Padmasalis in cotton weaving.

In the early 19th century, the Khatris, Bhatias and Lohanas were the main trading castes in Rajasthan, Delhi, Agra, Sind and Punjab. Banking, trading and business were considered "traditional occupations of the Khatri in Rajasthan".

During the Partition of British India in 1947, Khatris migrated en masse to India from the regions that comprise modern-day Pakistan.

=== Post independence ===
Harish Damodaran says the rise of Khatri industrialists in post-1947 India was a consequence initially of the cataclysmic Partition, which pushed them in droves towards Delhi and its neighbourhoods. This exodus opened new opportunities for them. A combination of enterprise, articulation, and strategic closeness to the national capital— which, in itself, was becoming a major growth hub - created conditions for Khatri capital to flourish in the post-Partition period.

Damodaran adds the land Khatris originally belonged to had very little industry and rail infrastructure until the 20th century and hence were not comparable to merchant groups like the Banias in terms of scale and spread of operation. Before independence they were only regional players and their rise in phenomenal proportions was a post-independence feature. Since then, they have produced leading entities in fields of pharmaceuticals, two-wheelers, tractors, paper, tyre-making and hotels with the groups of Ranbaxy, Hero, Mahindra, Ballarpur Industries, Apollo Tyres and Oberoi respectively. They have also co-founded companies like Snapdeal, Hotmail, YesBank, IndiaToday, AajTak, IndiGo Airlines, Sun Microsystems, Max Group etc.

Punjabi Khatris and others, together with the traditionally "urban and professional" castes, formed a part of the elite middle class immediately after independence in 1947. According to P. K. Verma, "Education was a common thread that bound together this pan Indian elite" and almost all the members of these General castes communities could read and write English and were educated beyond school.

In Kashmir many Khatris had to face the brunt of 1990 Kashmiri Hindu Exodus.

Anthropologist Irawati Karve, based on the post-Independence research of castes in Konkan, Maharashtra, classified Marathi Khatris (Note: Khatris claimed to live near the Bombay island from at least the mid-1800s and would speak Marathi.) as one of the "professional/advanced castes" as they were doctors, engineers, clerks, lawyers, teachers, etc. during independence. She states their traditional professions was silk weaving and working as merchants although they had entered other professions later.

== Demographics ==
=== After partition ===
Apart from Punjab, Khatris arrived in Delhi and Haryana among other regions after the partition where they make up 9% and 8.0% of the population respectively.

Delhi's population increased by 1.1 million in the period 1941–1951. This growth of 106% largely resulted from the influx of Partition migrants among other reasons. These were members of the Hindu and Sikh Khatri/Arora castes of the West Punjab. Many moved to the city for better economic opportunities.

The Khatris of Himachal Pradesh are the numerically most important commercial classes and are mostly concentrated in Mandi, Kangra and Chamba.

According to Inderjeet Singh, in Afghanistan, Afghan Hindus and Afghan Sikhs are mainly of Khatri and Arora origin.

=== Before partition ===
The French traveller Jean de Thévenot visited India during the 1600s where he commented "At Multan, there is another sort of gentiles whom they call Catry, the town is properly their country and from thence they spread all over the Indies." According to Dr. Madhu Tyagi, Thevenot is referring to the Hindu Khatri caste here.

The last caste-based census was conducted by the British in 1931 which regarded Khatri and Arora as a different caste. During 1931, Khatris were prominent in the West Punjab and North-Western Frontier Province (NWFP), which is now known as Khyber Pakhtunkhwa (KPK). The Khatris spoke Hindko and Potohari language. The highest concentration of Khatris (excluding Aroras) was in the Potohar regions of Jhelum and Rawalpindi. In NWFP, the Khatris were found mainly in Peshawar and Hazara.

Arora-Khatris were centered in the Multan and Derajat regions of Punjab and NWFP. In the NWFP, the Aroras which are considered a sub-caste of Khatris by some scholars and were concentrated in the districts of Bannu, Kohat and Dera Ismail Khan. The Aroras spoke the Jatki language which is the 9th century version of Saraiki according to Ibbetson.

They were also found in Afghanistan at a population of 300,000 in 1880. According to an 1800s colonial source referred by Shah Hanifi, "Hindki is the name given to Hindus who live in Afghanistan. They are Hindus of Khatri class and are found all over Afghanistan even amongst the wildest tribes. They are wholly occupied in trade and form numerous portion of the population of all the cities and towns, and are also to be found in the majority of large villages."

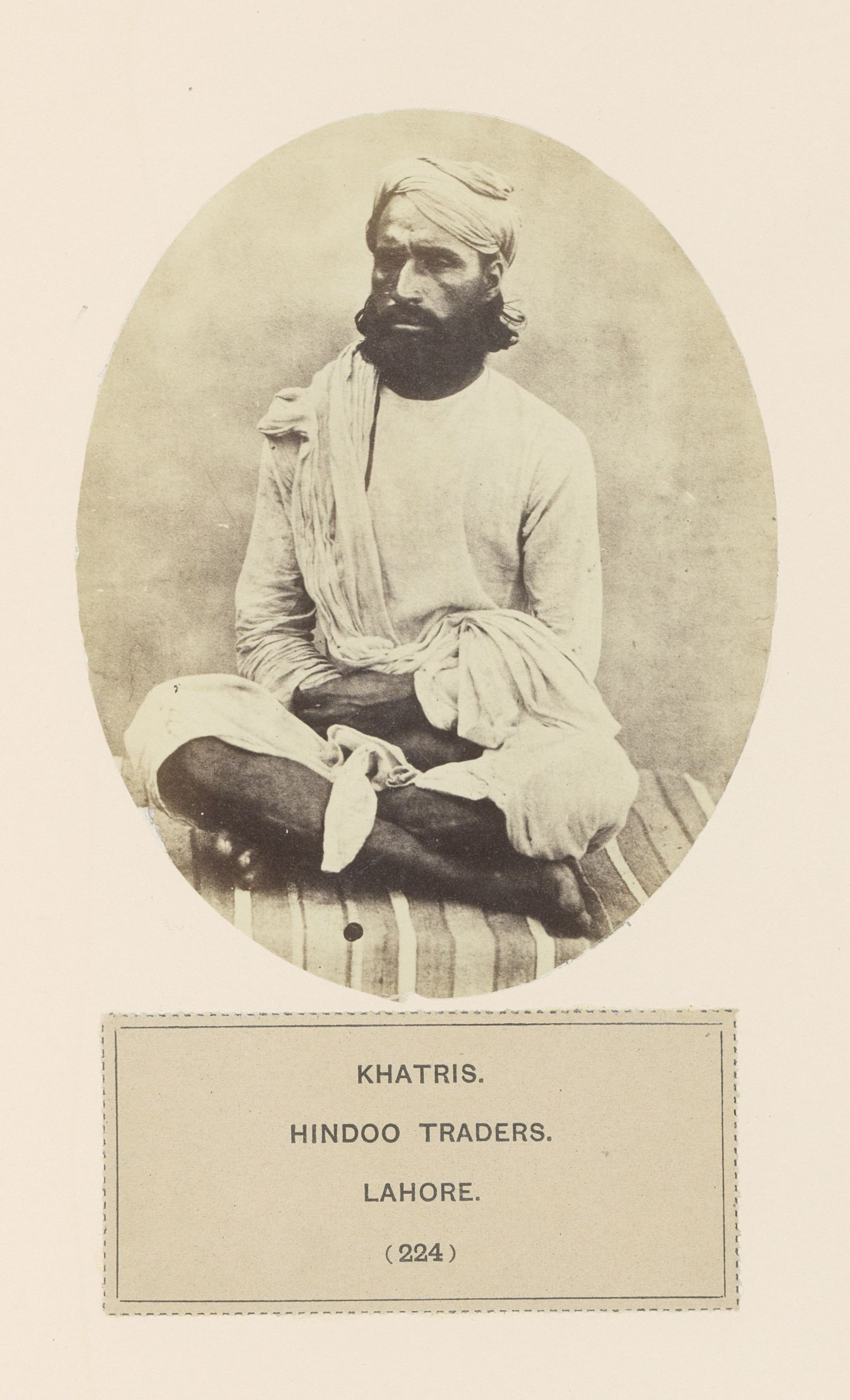
Photograph of a Hindu Khatri man of Lahore c. 1859-1869

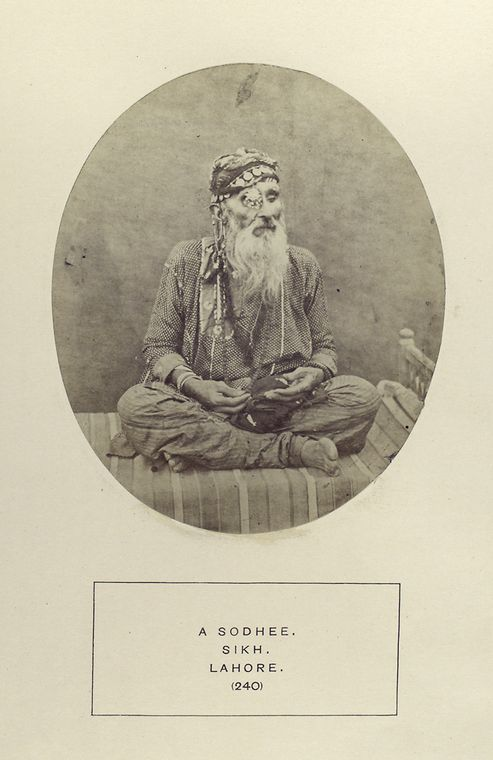
Sikh of Sodhi clan, Lahore.

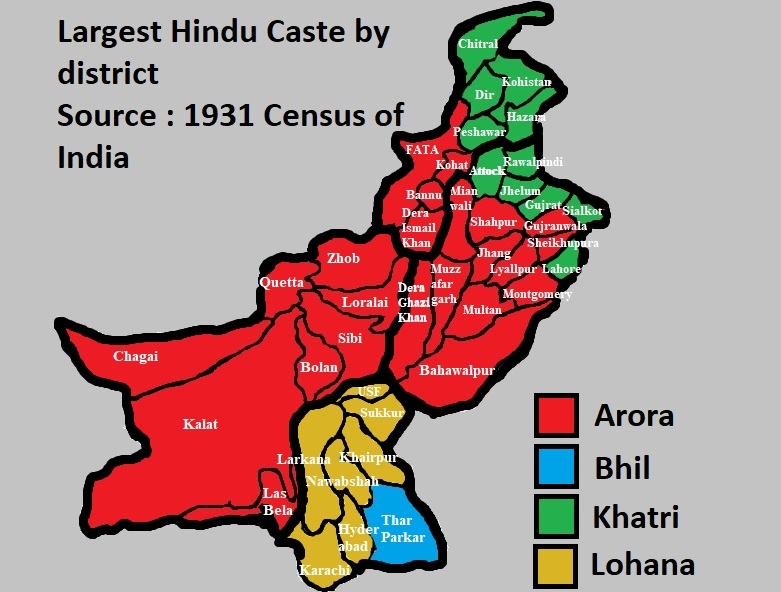
Map depicting the most numerous community by district according to Census of India 1931.

Population Concentration of Khatris & Aroras by region (Note: The numbers are expected to be more since many Hindus boycotted the Census)
Region	State	Total % pop.	Khatri	Arora	Year	Ref
Amritsar district	Punjab (East)	05.47%	03.30%	02.17%	1901	
Attock dist.	Punjab (West)	09.90%	07.32%	02.58%	1901	
Bahawalpur dist.	Punjab (West)	07.36%	00.50%	06.86%	1931	
Balochistan	Balochistan	01.93%	00.03%	01.90%	1931	
Bannu dist.	KPK	07.83%	00.50%	07.30%	1921	
DG Khan dist.	Punjab (West)	10.01%	00.79%	09.22%	1891	
DI Khan dist.	KPK	09.86%	00.72%	09.14%	1901	
Dir, Chitral & Swat	KPK	20.33%	16.32%	04.01%	1901	
Ferozpur dist.	Punjab (East)	03.57%	01.11%	02.46%	1901	
Gujranwala dist.	Punjab (West)	10.01%	04.46%	05.55%	1931	
Gujrat district	Punjab (West)	06.30%	02.46%	03.84%	1901	
Gurdaspur dist.	Punjab (East & West)	01.98%	01.83%	00.15%	1901	
Hazara district	KPK	02.97%	02.29%	00.68%	1901	
Jammu Province	Jammu-Kashmir	03.01%	03.01%	00.00%	1901	
Kangra district	Himachal Pradesh	00.87%	00.85%	00.02%	1931	
Kohat district	KPK	05.07%	01.50%	03.57%	1921	
Jalandhar dist.	Punjab (East)	02.88%	02.78%	00.10%	1901	
Jhang district	Punjab (West)	15.06%	04.34%	10.72%	1931	
Jhelum district	Punjab (West)	09.77%	07.27%	02.50%	1881	
Lahore district	Punjab (West)	08.01%	05.10%	02.91%	1931	
Lyallpur district	Punjab (West)	07.50%	01.82%	05.68%	1931	
Mianwali district	Punjab (West)	13.20%	02.24%	10.96%	1931	
Montgomery dist	Punjab (West)	11.91%	01.09%	10.82%	1901	
Multan district	Punjab (West)	14.05%	01.53%	12.52%	1901	
Muzzafargarh dist	Punjab (West)	09.67%	00.45%	09.22%	1931	
Patiala district	Punjab (East)	01.29%	01.14%	00.15%	1901	
Peshawar dist.	KPK	04.34%	02.26%	02.08%	1921	
Rawalpindi dist.	Punjab (West)	10.01%	07.71%	02.30%	1891	
Shahpur district	Punjab (West)	11.08%	03.02%	08.06%	1901	
Sheikhupura dist	Punjab (West)	05.50%	02.18%	03.32%	1931	
Sialkot district	Punjab (West)	04.01%	02.01%	02.00%	1921	

== Varna status ==
M. N. Srinivas states Khatri made different Varna claims at different times in the Census of India before Independence. In 1911, they did not make any Varna claim, while in 1921 they claimed a Kshatriya status but later in 1931 they claimed a Vaishya status. However, most scholars do not agree with the Khatris' claims to Kshatriya varna. They consider castes in north India, like Khatri and Kayastha to be merchant castes who claimed higher status based on the educational and economic progress they made in the past.

According to Anand Yang, the Khatris in the Saran district of Bihar, were included in the list of "Bania" along with Agarwals and Rastogis of the Vaishya Varna. According to Yang, their position in the Varna system should be "just below" the twice-born varnas. Jacob Copeman writes "Agarwal, Khatri, and Bania usually denote people of merchant-trader background of middling clean-caste status, often of Vaishya varna".

The Saraswat Brahmins are the purohits of Khatris and accept gifts only from them. Jürgen Schaflechner cites the historian Rowe who states such Saraswat Brahmins who were considered a low caste, formed a symbiotic relationship with Vaishya castes such as Khatris, Lohanas, etc. who were trying to raise their varna status - which in turn would benefit the Saraswats as well. For this purpose, certain religious texts were written during the British Raj era.

According to Christophe Jaffrelot, majority of the male members of the Arya Samaj in the late 19th century Punjab came from the Arora and Khatri merchant castes. He cites Norman G. Barrier to show that the philosophy of the Arya Samaj founder, Dayananda Saraswati, was responsible for the aspirations of these Vaishya castes from Punjab to higher status:

Dayananda's claim that caste should be determined primarily by merit not birth, opened new paths of social mobility to educated Vaishyas who were trying to achieve social status commensurate with their improving economic status

While some historians agree with the claim of Khatris to be of Kshatriya varna, many others do not. According to some historians, even though they participated in mercantile or other occupationally diverse professions such as Agriculture, they were originally Kshatriyas. In Indian historian Satish Chandra's opinion, certain castes like Khatris and Kayasthas "do not quite fit" in the Hindu Varna system. According to him, Khatris are neither Vaishyas nor Kshatriyas but are "par excellence traders".

Susan Bayly states the Khatris had scribal traditions and despite this Khatri caste organisations in the British Raj era tried to portray their caste as Kshatriyas. Similar caste glorifying ideas were written by the historian Baij Nath Puri who describes Khatris as "one of the most acute, energetic, and remarkable race [sic] in India", "pure descendants of the old Vedic Kshatriyas" and "true representatives of the Aryan nobility". Puri also tried to show the Khatris as higher than the Rajputs whose blood he considered "impure", mixed with ‘inferior’ Kolis or ‘aborigines’. She considers his views to represent those of "pre-Independence race theorists". Bayly further describes the Khatris as a "caste title of north Indians with military and scribal traditions". Hardip Singh Syan says Khatris considered themselves to be of pure Vedic descent and thus superior to the Rajputs, who like them claim the Kshatriya status of the Hindu varna system.

=== Punjab ===
Historian Kenneth W. Jones states the Khatris of Punjab had some justification in claiming Kshatriya status from the British government. However, the fact that this claim was not granted at the time showing their ambiguous position in the varna system. Although Jones also classifies Khatris as one of the Vaishya caste of Punjabi Hindus, he shows that their social status was higher than the Arora, Suds and Baniyas in the 19th century Punjab. He quotes Ibbetson who states that the Punjabi Khatris who held prominent military and civil posts were traditionally different from the Aroras, Suds or Baniyas who were rural, of low status and mostly commercial. Punjabi Khatris, on the other hand, were urban, usually prosperous and literate. Thus, the Khatris led the Vaishyas in seeking a higher social position in the flexible Varna hierarchy based on their superior achievements. Similar social mobility efforts were followed by other Hindus in Punjab.

McLane also describes them as a "mercantile caste who claimed to be Kshatriyas". In the 19th century, British failed to agree whether their claim of Kshatriya status should be accepted. Nesfield and Campbell were leaning towards accepting this claim but Risley and Ibbetson cast doubts on it. McLane opines that the confusion was caused since Khatris pursued mercantile occupations and not military ones. However, he adds that this Vaishya occupation fact was balanced by their origin myths, the "possible" derivation of the word Khatri from Kshatriya, their large physical stature, the superior status accorded to them by other Punjabis as well as the willingness of the Saraswat Brahmins, their chaplains, to accept cooked food from them.

In the case of Sikh Khatris, their Kshatriya claim reflects a contradictory attitude towards the traditional Hindu caste system. It is evident in Guru Granth Sahib, which on the one hand rises above the Hindu caste paradigm and on the other hand seeks to portray the Khatri gurus as a group of warrior-defenders of their faith, just as with the Kshatriya varna.

Majority of the male members of the Arya Samaj in the late 19th century Punjab came from the Arora and Khatri merchant castes. In Punjab, the Kshatriya castes who were ritually higher than the Aroras and Khatris had been disempowered and thus the Brahmins who had lost their patrons had to turn to these non-Kshatriya castes. Christophe Jaffrelot explains the attraction of these trading castes to the Arya Samaj as a means of social mobility associated with their prosperity during the British rule. He cites N. G. Barrier to show that the philosophy of the Arya Samaj founder, Dayananda Saraswati, was responsible for the aspirations of these Vaishya castes from Punjab to higher status:

Dayananda's claim that caste should be determined primarily by merit not birth, opened new paths of social mobility to educated Vaishyas who were trying to achieve social status commensurate with their improving economic status

=== Rajasthan, Gujarat and Maharashtra ===
Dasharatha Sharma described Khatris of Rajasthan as a mixed pratiloma caste of low ritual status but they could be a mixed caste born of Kshatriya fathers and Brahmin mothers. Banking, trading, agriculture and service are traditional occupations of the Khatris in Rajasthan. The literacy rate is appreciably high among them.

Ashok Malik, former press secretary to the President of India, says that there were two groups of Khatris in Gujarat, that arrived right after the Mughal invasion and during the reign of Akbar respectively. The latter considered themselves superior to the former and they called themselves "Brahmakshatriyas" after arriving in Gujarat. When the older Khatri community of Gujarat started prospering, they also started calling themselves "Brahmakshatriya", causing the new Khatri community to panic and adopt the name "Nayar Brahmakshatriyas" for themselves. In addition, another community - the Gujarati Telis, considered an Other Backward Class (OBC) in India began to call themselves Khatris. Malik calls this as Sanskritization.

Historian Vijaya Gupchup from the University of Mumbai states that in Maharashtra, Brahmins showed resentment in the attempt by the Marathi Khatris or Koshti to elevate themselves from ritually low status to Kshatriya by taking advantage of the British neutrality towards castes. She quotes a translation from a Marathi publication that gave a Brahminic opinion of this attempt:

Everyone does what he wants, Sonars have become Brahmins, Treemungalacharya was insulted by throwing cowdung at him in Pune, but he has no shame and still calls himself a Brahmin. Similarly a Khatri or Koshti who are included in Panchal at places other than Bombay, call themselves Kshatriya in Bombay and say their needles are the arrows and their thimbles are the sheaths. How surprising that those Sonars and Khatris at the hands of whom even Shudras will not take water have become Brahmins and Kshatriyas. In short day by day higher castes are disappearing and lower castes are prospering.

== Clan organisation ==
Historically, Khatris were divided into various hierarchal endogamous sections. This includes urhai/dhai ghar, char ghar, barah ghar/bahri and bunjayee or bavanjah ghar which translated to House of 2.5, 4, 12 and 52 respectively. They formed the majority of Khatris and were deemed superior. This was followed by Sareen Khatris who formed a minority. Another sub-group of Khatris include Khukhrain which had split up from the bunjayees.

Group	Clan names
House of 2.5	Kapoor, Khanna and Mehra/Malhotra
House of 4	Including the above 3, Seth (also known as Kakar) is also added which forms this unit
House of 12	Including the above 4, Chopra, Dhawan, Mahindru/Mohindra, Mehrotra, Sehgal, Talwar, Tandon, Vohra and Wadhawan is added
House of 52 (Bunjahis)	Abhi, Bagga, Bahl, Bakshi, Bassi, Beri, Bhambri, Bhandari, Chandok, Chhachhi, Chaudhary, Dheer, Dhoopar, Duggal, Ghai, Handa, Jalota, Jhanjhi, Johar, Kandhari, Katyal, Khullar, Kochhar, Lamba, Mal, Madhok, Mago, Maini, Makkar, Mangal, Nanda, Puri, Rana, Rekhi, Sachar, Sial, Sibal, Soi, Soni, Tangri, Thapar, Tuli, Uppal, Vij, Vinaik and Wahi
Khukrains	Anand, Bhasin, Chadha, Kohli, Ghai, Sabharwal, Sahni (Sawhney), Sethi and Suri.
Aroras	Ahuja, Allawadi, Aneja, Babbar, Bajaj, Batra, Baweja, Bhutani, Chhabra, Chhimba, Chhapola, Channa, Chandna, Chawla, Chugh, Dawar, Dhingra, Dhuria, Dua, Dudeja, Juneja, Gambhir, Gaba, Gandhi, Gera, Grover, Gulati, Gumber, Hans, Huria, Kalra, Kamra, Kaura, Khattar, Khetarpal, Khurana, Luthra, Madaan, Manchanda, Mehndiratta, Mehmi, Mehta, Midha, Miglani, Munjal, Nagpal, Narang, Narula, Pasricha, Pruthi, Rajpal, Rawail, Sachdeva, Saini, Saluja, Sardana, Sethi, Suneja, Taneja, Tuteja, Wadhwa and Walia
Others (including Sareens)	Abrol, Arya, Ajimal, Alagh, Badhwar, Baijal, Bawa, Bedi, Bhagat, Bhalla, Bindra, Chatrath, Chhatwal, Chhura, Dang, Dhariwal, Diwan, Goindi, Gujral, Jaggi, Jolly, Julka, Kanwar, Kashyap, Kaushal, Keer, Khalsa, Kharbanda, Khehar, Khosla, Lal, Majithia, Malik, Marwah, Nagrath, Nayyar, Nijhawan, Oberoi, Ohri, Pahwa, Passi, Popat, Qanungo, Ratra, Rekhi, Saggar, Sarna, Saund, Shroff, Sobti, Sodhi, Takiar, Thakkar, Trehan, Varma and Vig (Whig)

=== Related communities ===
==== Arora ====
The Arora is a community that Levi describes as a sub-caste of Khatris. They originate in Punjab and Sindh region. The name is derived from their native place Aror and the community comprises both Hindus and Sikhs. As per W. H. McLeod, a historian of Sikhism, "traditionally the Aroras, though a relatively high caste were inferior to the Khatris, but the difference has now progressively narrowed. Khatri-Arora marriages are not unknown nowadays."

==== Gaddi ====
Gaddi is a nomadic shepherding tribe that resides in the mountainous terrains of the Himalayas. Gaddi is an amalgamation of various groups such as Khatris, Rajputs, Brahmins etc. Most Gaddis of Himachal Pradesh call themselves Khatris. There is a popular saying among them "Ujreya Lahore te baseya Bharmaur" meaning that when Lahore was deserted (possibly by the Muslim invasion), Bharmour was inhabited. Some Khatris clans are known to have settled there during Aurangzeb's reign.

== Religious groups ==
=== Hindu Khatris ===
The vast majority of Khatris are Hindu. Many Hindu Khatris made their first newborn a Sikh. Daughters were married into both Hindu and Sikh families according to the Khatri sub-hierarchy rules. Hindu-Sikh intermarriages among Khatris and Aroras were common in the cities of Peshawar and Rawalpindi. They worship Hinglaj Mata, Chandi Mata, Shiva, Hanuman and Vishnu's avatars. Worship of totemistic symbols such as snakes and trees used to be common among them. Meditation upon the flame while reciting Vidhyavasini's hymns was a common practice and reverence was paid to the dead ancestors. They are both vegetarian and non-vegetarian depending on their affiliations with the sects of Vaishnavism and Shaktism respectively. Sects of Arya Samaj, Nirankari and Radhasoami are also followed.

=== Sikh Khatris ===
All the ten Sikh Gurus were from various Khatri clans. The early followers of Guru Nanak were Khatris but later a large number of Jats joined the faith. Some clans associated with the Khatri community, such as Sodhi and Uppal, are also found among Jat communities in Punjab. Khatris and Brahmins opposed "the demand that the Sikhs set aside the distinctive customs of their castes and families, including the older rituals."

Bhapa (pronounced as Pahpa) is a term used in a derogatory sense to denote Sikhs who left Potohar Region of modern-day Pakistan during Partition, specifically of Khatri and Arora caste. Bhapa translates to elder brother in the Potohari dialect spoken around Rawalpindi region. McLeod, referring to the Khatris and Aroras says "The term is typically used dismissively by Jats to express opprobrium towards Sikhs of these castes. Until recently it was never used in polite company or print, but today the word is used quite openly" According to Birinder Pal Singh, Jat Sikhs consider only themselves as Sikhs and consider Khatris as "bhapas". In Nicola Mooney's opinion, Jat Sikhs consider Arora Sikhs as "Hindu Punjabis" which reserves Sikhism for the Jats alone, denying even the fully baptised Arora as Sikhs.

=== Muslim Khatris ===
According to Historian B. N. Puri, Muslim Khatris are commonly known as Khojas in Punjab. The Khattak tribe of Pashtuns is credited having originated from the Khatris, but beliefs regarding its descent are divided, according to the 1883 book "Glossary of the Tribes and Castes of the Punjab and North-West Frontier Province".

== Occupations ==
They were the dominant commercial and financial administration class of late-medieval India. Some in Punjab often belonged to hereditary agriculturalist land-holding lineages, while others were engaged in artisanal occupations such as silk production and weaving.

In the 1830s, Khatris were working as governors in districts like Bardhaman, Lahore, Multan, Peshawar and Hazara, but independently from Mughal rule.

During the British colonial era, they also served as lawyers and engaged in administrative jobs in the colonial bureaucracy. Some of them served in the British Indian army after being raised as Sikhs.

Khatris have played an active role in the Indian Armed Forces since 1947, with many heading it as the Chief of Army or Admiral of the Navy. Some such as Vikram Batra and Arun Khetarpal have won India's highest wartime gallantry award, the Param Vir Chakra.

== Culture and lifestyle ==
According to Prakash Tandon, during Khatri weddings, a ritual is carried out to test the Khatri groom's strength. The groom is supposed to slice the thick branch or stem of a Jandi Tree (Prosopis cineraria) in one blow using a sword. During the pregnancy period of a female, a baby shower ceremony called "reetan" or "goadbharai" is carried out amongst Khatris and Aroras. During the event, gifts are showered to the pregnant mother from family and friends among other traditions.

== Sikh theology and literature ==
=== Sikh theology ===
In Guru Granth Sahib, the primary scripture of Sikhism, Khatri is mentioned as one among the four varnas.

ਖਤ੍ਰੀ ਬ੍ਰਾਹਮਣ ਸੂਦ ਵੈਸ ਉਪਦੇਸੁ ਚਹੁ ਵਰਨਾ ਕਉ ਸਾਝਾ ॥ (SGGS, ang 747)

Khatri brahman sud vais updesu cahu varna ku sanjha Kshatriyas, Brahmins, Shudras and Vaishyas all have the same mandate

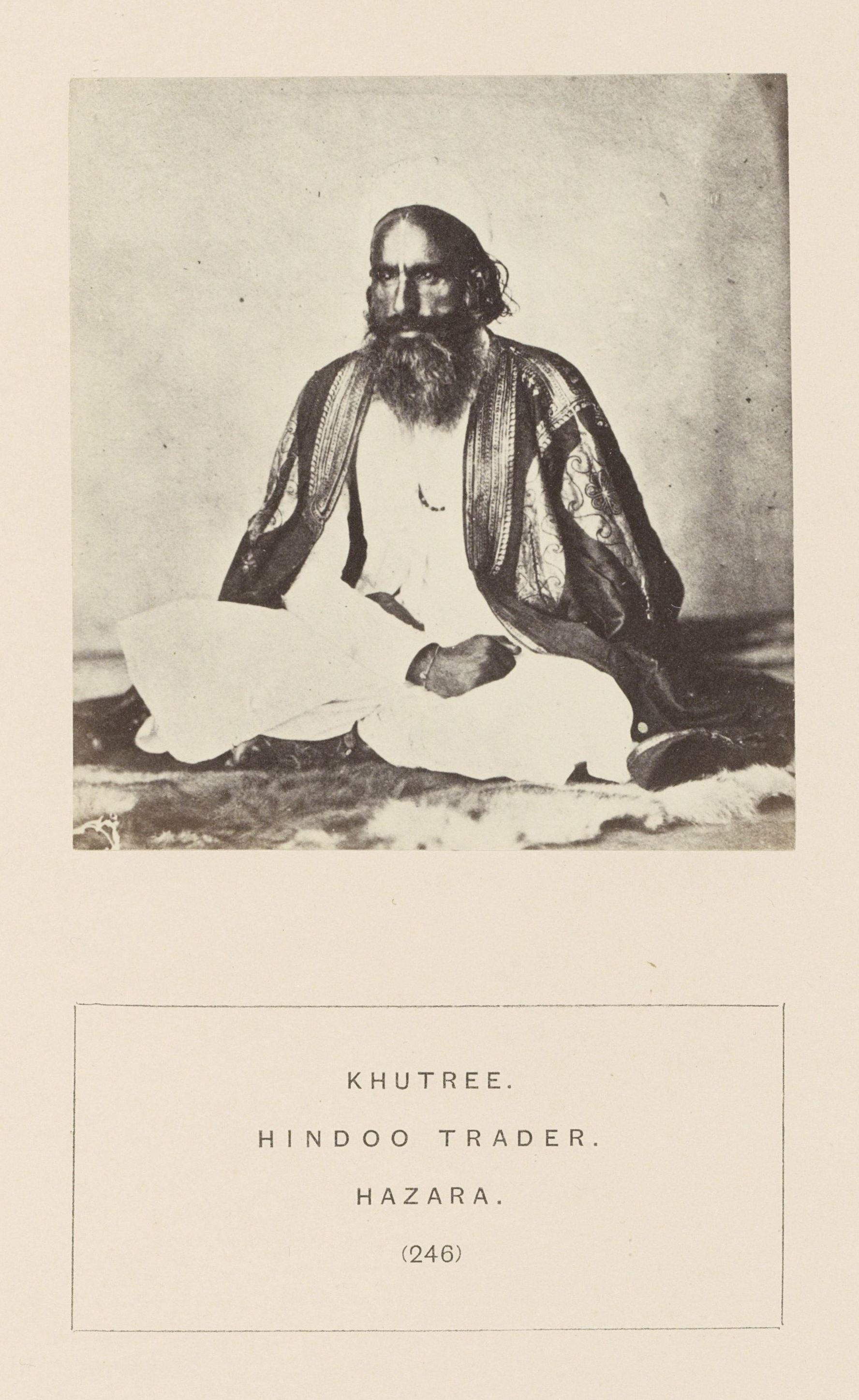
Photograph of a Hindu Khatri man of Hazara c. 1868-1872

Guru Gobind Singh, said the following in a swayya:

Chattri ko poot ho, Baman ko naheen kayee tap aavat ha jo karon; Ar aur janjaar jito greh ko tohe tyaag, kahan chit taan mai dharon, Ab reejh ke deh vahey humko jo-oo, hau binti kar jor karoon; Jab aao ki audh nidaan bane, att hi ran main tab jujh maroon.

I am the son of a Chhatri, not of a Brahmin and I will live according to my Dharma. All other complications of life are meaningless for me, and I set my heart on the path of righteousness. I humbly beseech thee God Almighty that when the time comes for me to fulfill my Dharma, may I die with honour in the field of battle.

— Translated by Vanit Nalwa

=== Punjabi literature ===
Khatris are mentioned in a popular Punjabi literature "Heer Ranjha" written by Waris Shah.

Heer's beauty slays rich Khojas and Khatris in the bazaar, like a murderous Kizilbash trooper riding out of the royal camp armed with a sword

— Waris Shah (Translated by Charles Frederick Usborne)

== Notables ==
- List of Khatris
