= Kochhar =

Indian Surname

Kochhar or Kochar is a surname found among the Punjabi Khatri community of India.

== History ==
Before 1947, Kochhars were located in the districts of Gujrat and Jhang in Punjab, Pakistan. According to historian R. C. Dogra, Kochhar comes from the word "Kavach" meaning armour.

Among the Khatris, it is part of the Bunjahi sub-caste which consists of clans such as Duggal, Handa, Johar, Puri, Nanda, Thapar, Vij, Wahi and 44 other clans.

The Kochhar clan has produced Dewan Mokham Chand, described as one of the most important generals of Maharaja Ranjit Singh of Sikh Empire who was responsible for defeating the Durrani Empire.

== Notable people ==
=== Historical figures ===
- Dewan Mokham Chand (died 1814), Indian general of the Sikh Empire
- Moti Ram (1770–1837), Indian administrator of the Sikh Empire
- Diwan Ram Dayal (1792–1820), Indian general and administrator of the Sikh Empire
- Diwan Kirpa Ram (died 1842), Indian general and administrator of the Sikh Empire

=== Modern ===
- Atul Kochhar, Indian chef who is the first person to receive a Michelin Star
- Ajay Kochhar, Rear Admiral serving Flag officer in the Indian Navy
- Archana Kochhar (born 1972), Indian fashion designer
- Chanda Kochhar (born 1961), Indian banker, retired MD and CEO of ICICI Bank
- Dheeraj Kumar (born 1944), Indian actor and producer
- Gaurav Kochar (born 1992), Indian cricketer
- Pradeep Kochar (born 1959), Indian cricketer
- Samir Kochhar (born 1980), Indian actor in Sacred Games
- Saadiya Kochar, Indian traveler and photographer
- Tahira Kochhar (born 1990), Indian actress
- Vikram Kochhar (born 1983), Indian actor
- Vim Kochhar (born 1936), Indo-Canadian businessman and first Senator from the community
