= Bindra =

Bindra (Punjabi: ਬਿੰਦਰਾ) is a Punjabi surname found among Jats and Khatris. Many Khatris clans were native to the Rawalpindi district of West Punjab before the Partition of India.

== Notable people ==
Notable people with the surname, who may or may not be affiliated with the Surname, include:

- Abhinav Bindra (born 1982), Indian sports shooter
- Dalbir Bindra (1922–1980), Canadian psychologist
- Dolly Bindra (born 1970), Indian actress
- Ishar Bindra (1921–2015), Indian-American investor, entrepreneur and philanthropist, founder-trustee of the Sikh Forum of New York, USA
- Inderjit Singh Bindra, Indian cricketer and cricket administrator
- Jagjeet (Jeet) S. Bindra, member of the board of directors of LyondellBasell.
- Mahesh Bindra, New Zealand politician
- Prerna Singh Bindra, Indian environmental journalist and travel writer
- Satinder Bindra, Canadian TV news reporter
