= Abrol =

Abrol is an Indian (Punjabi) surname found among Khatri Hindus and Sikhs. Notable people with the surname include:

- Anjali Abrol, Indian actress
- Mohit Abrol (born 1988), Indian television actor
- Vijay Kumar Abrol (born 1950), known by his pen name Zahid, Indian poet

== See also ==
- Abro, Sindhi Sammat tribe
