= Katyal =

Katyal is an Indian Khatri surname.

== Origin ==
Katyals originally belonged to the Jhang district especially the town of Chiniot where they were rich zamindars. In Jhang city, a mohalla (neighborhood) dedicated to Katyals as well as Maghu Khatris is present near the Chowk Bazar.

Katyals has a kaushal gotra on the name of kaushal rishi

kuldevi -shivay mata

kuldevta -hanuman ji

== Notable people ==
- Akhil Katyal (born 1985), Indian poet
- Nand Katyal (born 1935), Indian artist
- Neal Katyal (born 1970), Indian-American lawyer
- Rupin Katyal (1974/75–1999), Indian hijacking victim during the Indian Airlines flight 814 hijacking
- Sonia Katyal, American legal scholar and politician
- Vilayati Ram Katyal (1935–1988), Indian politician
