= Beri (surname) =

Beri, alternatively spelled Berry (Punjabi: ਬੇਰੀ) is a Punjabi surname found among Khatris. According to folklore, their ancestor was born under a Beri tree which is how they derive their name. They were originally Chopras. They are found in Jagraon and Ludhiana.

== Notable people ==
- Ambica Beri, Indian art gallery owner
- Narendra Nath Bery, Indian dentist
- Pankaj Berry (born 1956), Indian actor
- Prem Bery, Indian social worker and civil servant
- Rajinder Beri (born 1962), Indian politician and President of the District Congress Committee Jalandhar
- Ritu Beri (born 1972), Indian fashion designer
- Sudesh Berry, Indian actor
- Suman Bery, Indian economist, academic and writer
- Suraj Berry, Vice Admiral of Indian Navy
- Tara Alisha Berry (born 1988), Indian actress
- Vikas Berry (born 1977), Indian-American chemical engineer, scientist and academic
- Vijay Kumar Berry (born 1938), Indian brigadier
