= Khetarpal =

Khetarpal, also spelled Khetrapal, is a surname used by Punjabi Hindus and Sikhs of the Khatri caste.

Notable people with the surname, who may or may not be affiliated to the clan, include:

- Abha Khetarpal (born 1968), Indian activist
- Arun Khetarpal (1950–1971), decorated Indian army officer
- Aushim Khetarpal, Indian actor and producer
- Chunni Lal Khetrapal (1937–2021), Indian chemical physicist
- Poonam Khetrapal Singh, Indian health administrator
- Reva Khetrapal (born 1952), Indian judge
- Sudha Kheterpal (born 1982), British-Indian musician
- [Sambhav Khetarpal] (born 1991), Indian screenwriter
