= Yash Ghai =

Kenyan academic

Yash Pal Ghai CBE

Chairman of the 2013 Constitutional Commission, Fiji Commission
- In office June 2012 – December 2012
- President: Epeli Nailatikau

Personal details
- Born: 20 October 1938 (age 87) Nairobi, Kenya Colony
- Party: Independent
- Education: Oxford (BA), (MA), (DCL); Harvard University (LLM)
- Occupation: Constitutional Lawyer
- Profession: Lawyer
- Positions: Professor, UEA–DAR (1968-70); Lecturer, Yale Law (1971-73); Research fellow, Uppsala (1973-78); Professor, Warwick (1978-89); Professor, HKU (1989-)

Yash Pal Ghai, CBE (born 20 October 1938) is a Kenyan academic in constitutional law. As of 2007, he was the head of the Constitution Advisory Support Unit of the United Nations Development Programme in Nepal. Until 2008, he was a Special Representative of the UN Secretary General in Cambodia on human rights. In September 2008, he resigned his post, following bitter arguments with the Government of Cambodia. He has been a Fellow of the British Academy since 2005.

Yash Pal Ghai is a writer and a poet .His known texts majoring in constitutional law discourse in Africa

== Early life and education ==
His grandparents were from the Khukhrain family-group of Khatris, who came from the Punjab region of North India, and were part of the waves of Indian migration in East Africa, sponsored by the British Empire. His father sent Ghai to Oxford University to study.

== Career ==
He was the Sir YK Pao Professor of Public Law at the University of Hong Kong starting in 1989. He has been an Honorary Professor there since his retirement in 2005. Prior to that, Ghai taught and did research in law at the University of Warwick, Uppsala University in Sweden, the International Legal Center in New York City, and Yale Law School. He has also taught courses at the University of Wisconsin Law School, as part of an exchange program.

He was the Chairman of the Constitution of Kenya Review Commission (which attempted to write a modern constitution for Kenya) from 2000 to 2004. Professor Ghai was also recently selected by the Fijian Military Government to be the Chairperson of Fiji's Constitutional Committee.

Ghai has also advised and assisted NGOs on human rights law-related work. He drafted the Asian Human Rights Charter—A People's Charter, a project of the Asian Human Rights Commission.

Ghai has written several books on law in Africa, the Pacific islands, and elsewhere.

== Honours and awards ==
Professor Ghai has received the following honours and awards:

=== Honours ===
- Papua New Guinea: Independence Medal, 1976
- Vanuatu: Vanuatu Independence Medal, 1980
- New Hebrides: Queen's Medal for Distinguished Service, 1980
- United Kingdom: Commander of The Most Excellent Order of the British Empire, 1980

=== Awards ===
- 2001: Distinguished Research Achievement Award from the University of Hong Kong

=== Honorary ===
- University of the South Pacific, Honorary degree, 1995
- Society for Advanced Legal Studies, Honorary fellow, 1997
- Law Society of Kenya, Honorary Life Member, 1998
- Queen's University, Canada, Honorary Doctorate of Laws (LLD), 2014
