= Dheer =

Dheer (also spelled as Dhir) is an Indian surname, it is used by Kashmiri Pandits and Punjabi Khatris. It can also be a masculine given name.

== Notable people ==
=== Given name ===
- Dheer Momaya, Indian film producer
- Dheer Charan Srivastav (born 1967), Indian actor
- Dhir Singh Pundir, 12th-century Indian king
- Kunwar Dhir, 17th-century Indian king

=== Surname ===
- Anuja Dhir (born 1968), British circuit judge and the first non-white judge to be appointed to sit at the Old Bailey court in London
- Ashwni Dhir (born 1968), Indian screenwriter,, director of the TV show "Athithi Tum Kab Jaoge" and producer of "Taarak Mehta Ka Ooltah Chashmah"
- Jagdish Lal, born Dhir Jagdish Lal (1920–1997), Indian cricketer
- Kewal Dheer (born 1938), Indian writer
- Maninder Singh Dhir (1952–2018), Indian politician
- Naman Dhir (born 1999), Indian cricketer
- Nikitin Dheer, Indian actor
- Pankaj Dheer (1956–2025), Indian actor who played the role of Karna in the TV series Mahabharat
- Ravinder Kumar Dhir, serving Air Marshal in the Indian Air Force
- Rishi Dhir, Canadian indie rock musician
- Santokh Singh Dhir (1920–2010), Indian Punjabi language writer
- Sunita Dhir (born 1971), Canadian politician
- Vijay K. Dhir, American engineer and researcher, former Dean of the University of California, Los Angeles (UCLA)
