= Oberoi =

Oberoi (also spelled as Uberoi, Oberai and Obhrai) is a surname used by the Punjabi Khatri caste of northern India.

== Notable people ==
Notable people bearing the name Oberoi, who may or may not be associated with the Khatri caste, include:

- Akshay Oberoi (born 1985), American-born Hindi film actor of Punjabi origin, nephew of Suresh Oberoi
- Anahita Uberoi (born 1967), Indian actress
- Deepak Obhrai (1950–2019), Tanzania-born Canadian politician
- Harjot Oberoi, Canadian Sikh scholar
- J. P. S. Uberoi (1934–2024), Indian sociologist and anthropologist
- Karan Oberoi (singer), Indian television actor, anchor and singer
- Karan Oberoi (model) (born 1987), an Indian fitness and fashion model
- Kavita Oberoi OBE (born 1970), British entrepreneur
- Mohan Singh Oberoi (1898–2002), founder of the Oberoi hotel chain
- Mohan Singh Diwana (1899–1984), Indian literary scholar and poet
- Neha Oberoi, Indian actress who has acted in Tollywood and Bollywood films
- Neha Uberoi (born 1983), American tennis player and psychotherapist
- Ojaswi Oberoi, now Ojaswi Aroraa (born 1985), an Indian television actress
- Praveen Oberoi (born 1953), Indian cricketer
- Prinal Oberoi, Indian actress who primarily works in Hindi serials & Gujarati films
- Prithvi Raj Singh Oberoi (born 1929), the Executive Chairman of EIH Limited
- Ranki Oberoi (born 1993), Dutch Paralympic athlete
- RJ Disha Oberoi, known as RJ Disha, Indian radio Jockey
- Salil Oberoi (born 1983), Indian cricketer
- Shelly Oberoi (born 1983), Indian politician
- Shikha Uberoi (born 1983), American tennis player
- Shivaleeka Oberoi (born 1995), Indian actress predominantly working in the Hindi film industry
- Suresh Oberoi (born 1946), Indian character actor
- Tirath Singh Oberoi, Indian Army officer and governor
- Vikas Oberoi (born 1969), Indian businessman
- Vinay Sheel Oberoi (1957–2020), IAS Officer
- Viresh Oberoi (born 1956), Indian businessman
- Vivek Oberoi (born 1976), Indian film actor, son of Suresh Oberoi

== See also ==
- List of Khatris
- Oberoi International School
- Oberoi Udaivilas
