= Bhapa =

Pejorative for Khatri and Arora Sikhs

Bhapa (also spelt as Bhappa or Bhaapa) is a term used in Punjab by the members of the Sikh community in a pejorative sense for Sikhs that migrated from Pakistan after the Partition of India in 1947. The term originally referred to Khatri and Arora Sikh migrant business-orientated families who originated from the Pothohar region (including Rawalpindi) but later evolved to encompass the entire Khatri Sikh community, both local and non-local.

== Description ==
=== Original meaning ===
Bhapa is a term used in the Potohari dialect in the Pothohar area (Jhelum, Rawalpindi, Peshawar, Bannu, and Kuhat) used by peoples from all religious backgrounds. It was a common term for the elder brother or father and is still often used in that sense. It is somewhat equivalent to sir. Derived from Sanskrit Bappa or Vapra, it is a cognate to Bawa. The term has occasionally been used as a royal title in some regions of India. The best-known king with the title was Bappa Rawal, the founder of the Guhilot dynasty.

=== As a pejorative ===
During the partition of Punjab in 1947, many Khatri Sikh business families from West Punjab migrated to what is today India. The migrants were especially welcomed by the Maharaja of Patiala, where they settled in Patiala. The term derives from the local Rawalpindi dialect of Punjabi. The slur was adopted from the term bhapa, which was used by the community to refer to both a father and elder brother. The term came to be used as a pejorative to refer to Khatri Sikhs, essentially to mark them as non-Jatts. The Khatri Sikhs came into conflict with the Banias, another trading caste, and the Jatt Sikhs, with there being a notable divide between Jatt and Khatri Sikhs. The Khatris and Jatts do not intermarry. Since the late 1960s, many Jatt Sikh youths in India started trimming their beards and wearing the turban with shorn/unshorn hair (Jatt Sikhs in foreign countries also began not wearing turbans), whereas Khatri Sikh youth rarely do this.

According to H. S. Bhatti, it is a popular term used to refer to urbanized Khatri Sikhs. Shiv Kumar Batalvi used the term "Bhaapawaad" to denote merchant class exploitation. He critiqued Balwant Gargi's poetry, and said Punjabi is language of common people, not of merchant class to benefit from it and exploit people.

Bhapa describes Sikhs who migrated to India, especially from the Rawalpindi area, also known as the Khukhrain's area, and its neighbouring regions. The Bhapa name at first was only associated with migrated Sikh traders/shopkeepers.
