= Tandon =

Tandon (Tandan, Tanden, or Tondon) is a surname found among the Hindu Khatris and Sikhs of Punjab, India.

== Notable people ==
Notable people with the surname, who may or may not be affiliated to the Surname, include:

=== Activists ===
- Purushottam Das Tandon (1882–1962), Bharat Ratna, Indian freedom fighter

=== Entertainment ===
- Amit Tandon, Indian singer, television actor
- Ayush Tandon (born 1998), Indian actor who played "Pi" in Life of Pi
- Kushal Tandon (born 1985), Indian model, television actor
- Lavina Tandon (born 1991), Indian actress
- Priya Tandon, Indian actress
- Raveena Tandon (born 1972), Indian actress
- Sachet Tandon (born 1989), Bollywood playback singer who has sung the song "Bekhayali"
- Saumya Tandon (born 1984), Indian television actress and host

=== Administrators ===
- B. B. Tandon, IAS officer who served as the 14th Chief Election Commissioner of India
- Chandrika Tandon (born 1954), Indian-American businesswoman and vice chairman at NYU Tandon School of Engineering
- Gulshan Lal Tandon (died 2012), Indian bureaucrat and former chairman of Coal India Limited
- Harish Tandon (born 1964), Indian judge
- Neera Tanden (born 1970), American political consultant and staff secretary to President Joe Biden since 2021
- Prakash Tandon (1911–2004), Indian effective, former chairman at Hindustan Lever and author

=== Artists ===
- Grace Martine Tandon, better known by her stage name Daya (born 1998), American singer and songwriter
- Loveleen Tandan, Indian casting and film director, co-director of Slumdog Millionaire
- Lekh Tandon (1929–2017), Indian filmmaker
- Manik Lal Tandon, Indian filmmaker
- Pratap Narayan Tandon (born 1935), Indian Hindi social novelist and literary critic
- Ravi Tandon (1935–2022), Indian film director and producer
- Shamir Tandon, Indian music composer and director

=== Athletes ===
- Ansh Tandon (born 2001), Indo-Emirati international cricketer
- Rakesh Tandon (born 1953), Indian cricketer
- Ramit Tandon (born 1992), professional squash player who represents India. He was ranked number 46 in the world and India rank 2.
- Shikha Tandon (born 1985), Indian swimmer with 146 national medals, and 36 medals in international competitions, including five gold medals. Arjuna Award winner.

=== Entrepreneurs ===
- Devdutt Tandon (1902–1980), founder of Tandon Motorcycles
- Rakhee Kapoor Tandon (born 1986), Indian-American business entrepreneur and venture capitalist. She is one of "India’s 25 Most Influential Women", according to India Today.
- Sirjang Lal Tandon (born 1942), Indian manufacturer of Tandon PC and disk drive, founder of Tandon Corporation

=== Politicians ===
- Ajay Tandon (born 1954), Indian politician
- Annu Tandon (born 1957), Indian politician, MP in the 15th Lok Sabha from Unnao, Uttar Pradesh
- Ashutosh Tandon (1960–2023), Indian politician and currently serving as Minister of Urban Development, Urban Employment and Poverty Alleviation in the UP Government.
- Balram Das Tandon (1927–2018), Indian politician and the former Governor of Chhattisgarh
- Mukesh Tandan, Indian politician
- Lalji Tandon (1935–2020), Indian politician who served as the Governor of Madhya Pradesh and Governor of Bihar.
- Sanjay Tandon (born 1963), Indian politician, Chandigarh State President of the Bharatiya Janata Party
- Shiv Narayan Tandon (died 1999), Indian politician
- Yash Tandon (born 1939), Indian-Ugandan policymaker, political activist, professor, author and public intellectual.

=== Scientists and doctors ===
- Atul Tandon (1948–2015), Indian professor of management
- Badri Nath Tandon (1931–2018), Indian gastroenterologist, hepatologist, medical researcher and academic
- Maya Tandon (born 1936), Indian anesthesiologist and road safety activist
- Prakash Narain Tandon (born 1928), Indian neuroscientist and neurosurgeon. Padma Bhushan awardee
- Pramod Tandon (born 1950), Indian Plant Biotechnologist and academic
- Nikhil Tandon (born 1963), Indian endocrinologist
- Nina Tandon, American biomedical engineer and tissue engineering researcher
- Rajesh Tandon, Indian practitioner of participatory research and development. He is one of the founding fathers of Participatory Research.
- Sampat Kumar Tandon (born 1945), Indian geologist. He is a former pro-vice chancellor at Delhi University
- Usha Tandon (born 1961), Indian academic and legal scholar
- Veena Tandon (born 1949), Indian parasitologist, academic and a NASI senior scientist
- Vibha Tandon, Indian academic and scientist in the fields of chemistry and molecular medicine

=== Others ===
- Lata Tondon (born 1980), Indian chef and marathon cook

== See also ==
- Tandon Corporation
- Tandon v. Newsom
