= Bawa =

Bawa may refer to:

== People ==
=== Surname ===
- Avantika Bawa (born 1973), Indian-American artist, curator, and professor
- Hemi Bawa (born 1948), Indian painter and sculptor
- Kamaljit S. Bawa (born 1939), Indian evolutionary ecologist, conservation biologist and professor
- Manjit Bawa (1941–2008), Indian painter
- Mohamed Bawa (born 2004), Libyan footballer
- Ranjit Bawa (born 1991), Panjabi Sikh singer
- Robin Bawa (born 1966), Canadian ice hockey player
- Samridh Bawa (born 1990), Indian model, television actor and director
- Vikram Bawa (born 1970), Indian fashion, advertising and landscape photographer
- Raj Angad Bawa (born 2002), Indian cricketer
- Geoffrey Bawa (1919 - 2003) Sri Lankan architect

=== Given name ===
- Bawa (sultan), Sultan of Kano 1660–1670
- Bawa Balwant (1915–1972), Indian writer, poet and essayist
- Bawa Jain (born 1957), secretary-general for the World Council of Religious Leaders
- Bawa Muhaiyaddeen (died 1986), Sri Lankan Tamil-speaking teacher and Sufi mystic
- Bawa Andani Yakubu (1926–2002), police officer, politician and king

== Other uses ==
- British Athletics Writers' Association
- Birds Australia Western Australia
- Bawa Falls, in South Africa
- Bawa, Iran, a village in Iran
