= Pasricha =

Pasricha may refer to:

- 21719 Pasricha (1999 RR115), a main-belt asteroid
- Avinash Pasricha, Indian photographer
- Jay Pasricha, Indian physician and researcher
- Josephine Acosta Pasricha (1945–2020), Filipino Indologist
- Neil Pasricha (born 1979), Canadian author and entrepreneur
- Parvinder Singh Pasricha, Indian police officer and commissioner
- Satwant Pasricha, Indian psychologist
- Sharan Pasricha (born 1980), Indian entrepreneur
- Ssumier Pasricha (born 1980), Indian actor, singer, and businessman
- Teenaa Kaur Pasricha, Indian filmmaker
