= Chandok (surname) =

Chandok (also spelled Chandiok, and Chandhok) is a Punjabi surname, found in the Khukhrain community.

== Notable people ==
- Archana Chandhoke (born 1982), Indian actress
- Kanika Kapoor Chandok (born 1978), Indian singer
- Karun Chandhok (born 1984), one of the first F1 race drivers of India
- Suhail Chandhok (born 1987), Indian commentator and actor
- Vicky Chandhok (born 1957), Indian race driver
