= Hans (surname) =

Hans is a surname. Notable people with the surname include:

- Charles Hans (1892–1951), French racing cyclist
- Hans Raj Hans (born 1962), Indian singer and politician
- Navraj Hans, Indian singer, actor, entrepreneur, cricket player and performer, son of Hans Raj Hans
- Oscar Hans (1910–after 1954), German war criminal
- Peter Hans, president of the University of North Carolina system beginning in 2020
- Sanne Hans (born 1984), Dutch singer-songwriter and guitarist
- Yuvraj Hans, Punjabi actor and singer, son of Hans Raj Hans

== See also ==
- Hans (given name)
