= Multanis =

Diaspora group centered in Multan

Multanis were an influential merchant diaspora from the Indian subcontinent that was widely active in Central and Western Asia between 14th and 19th centuries. They were centered in the city of Multan in modern-day Punjab, Pakistan.

The term 'Multanis' derived from the Multan region. During the medieval period, Multan or Multanistan was a subha located between Punjab and Sindh. In the 14th century, Zia al-Din Barani identified Multanis as important financiers and transregional agents of the Delhi Sultanate, distinct from other merchant and moneylender groups.

Historically, Multanis compromised two main ethnoreligious groups: Multani Muslims and Multani Hindus. Most Multanis Muslims were largely from the Lohana and Lohani communities, while Multani Hindus were mainly from the Bania and Khatri castes. Thevenot noted that a Hindu caste called Ca-try or Khatri, from Multan spread across India. As a leading merchant community under Mughal patronage, many Multanis and Banias mentioned in historical sources were likely Khatris. (Note: Although Bania (caste) and Khatri are two distinct Indian caste groups.)

== See also ==
- Multani (caste)
- Multani people
- Seraiki people
