= Nārang =

Nārang or Narang may refer to:

== Places ==
- Narang Mandi, a city in the Muridke Tehsil of Seikhupura District, Punjab, Pakistan
  - Narang railway station
- Nārag, or Nārang, a town of Chakwal District, in the Punjab province of Pakistan
- Narang Gewog, a gewog (village block) of Mongar District, Bhutan

== People ==
=== Given name ===
- Narang Pornsiriporn (born 2001), Thai swimmer

=== Surname ===
- Ankit Narang (born 1989), Indian television actor
- Arun Narang, Indian politician from Punjab
- Gagan Narang (born 1983), Indian sport shooter
- Gopi Chand Narang (1931–2022), Indian theorist, literary critic, and scholar
- Kirpal Singh Narang (1912–2019), Indian historian and educator
- Prineha Narang (born 1989), American scientist and quantum engineer
- Pulkit Narang (born 1994), Indian cricketer
- Shammi Narang (born 1956) Indian voice-over artist, news anchor, and entrepreneur
- Shivin Narang, Indian television actor
- Ved Narang, Indian politician
- Vipin Narang, American political scientist and federal official
- Narang, a fictional police officer portrayed by Manmohan Krishna in the 1975 Indian film Deewaar
- Veera Narang, a fictional character (daughter of the police officer) portrayed by Neetu Singh in the 1975 Indian film Deewaar

== See also ==
- Narangi, village in Maharashtra, India
- Narangi railway station, railway station in Guwahati, Assam, India
- Narangi Anchalik Mahavidyalaya, school in Guwahati, Assam, India
- Narangi Dam, dam in Vaijapur, Maharashtra, India
