= Nijhawan =

Nijhawan is a surname used by Punjabi Hindus and Sikhs of the Khatri caste. Notable people with the surname, who may or may not be affiliated to the clan, include:

- Bal Raj Nijhawan (1915–2014), Indian metallurgist and author
- Preetish Nijhawan, American entrepreneur
- Sonia Nijhawan, American astronomer
- Sumit Nijhawan (born 1978), Indian actor

== See also ==
- 21710 Nijhawan, minor planet
