= Puri (surname) =

Indian surname

Puri is an Indian surname. The Dictionary of American Family Names notes that it is found among the Khatris of Punjab and that puri means a small town in Punjabi but it is uncertain whether this is related to the surname.

== Bankers ==
- Aditya Puri, managing director, HDFC Bank
- K. R. Puri, former governor of the Reserve Bank of India, former MD at LIC India

== Businessmen and managers ==
- Amit Puri (born 1979), Indian chef and entrepreneur
- Aroon Purie (born 1944), Indian businessman and the founder and editor in chief of India Today
- Deepak Puri, founder of Moser Baer
- Madhabi Puri (born 1965), chairperson of the securities regulatory body Securities and Exchange Board of India
- Ratul Puri (born 1972), chairman of the board of directors of Hindustan Power

== Actors ==
- Aarti Puri (born 1985), Indian actress and model
- Akanksha Puri, Indian actress and model
- Amrish Puri (1932–2005), Indian actor in Hindi and American cinema
- Amrita Puri (born 1983), Indian actress in Hindi cinema
- Chaman Puri (1914–1988), Indian actor
- Koel Purie, Indian actress, producer and TV presenter
- Madan Puri (1915–1985), Indian actor in Hindi cinema
- Mayur Puri, Indian screenwriter, lyricist, actor and film-maker
- Neeta Puri, Indian actress and model
- Om Puri (1950–2017), Indian actor in Hindi and American cinema
- Pearl V Puri (born 1989), Indian television actor
- Preeti Puri, Indian actress
- Rajesh Puri, Indian actor
- Satyajeet Puri (born 1960), Indian actor
- Shashi Puri, Indian actor
- Vardhan Puri (born 1990), Indian actor
- Vibhu Puri (born 1980), Indian film director, writer and lyricist

== Independence activists and martyrs ==
- Ram Nath Puri (1881–1974), Indian freedom fighter best known as the editor of Circular-i-Azadi
- Haqiqat Rai Puri (1720–1734), Indian Hindu martyr

== Journalists and authors ==
- Balraj Puri (1928–2014), Indian journalist, writer and human rights activist
- Belle Puri, Canadian journalist
- Kailash Puri (1925–2017), Indian writer, poet and yoga teacher
- Kavita Puri, British journalist, radio broadcaster, and author
- Narottam Puri (born 1946), Indian sports journalist and broadcaster
- Pratima Puri (died 2007), Indian journalist best known for being Doordarshan's first newsreader
- Rajinder Puri (1934–2015), Indian cartoonist, veteran columnist and political activist

== Politicians ==
- Hardeep Singh Puri (born 1952), Indian cabinet minister
- Lakshmi Puri (born 1952), Indian diplomat and former assistant secretary-general at the United Nations and the former deputy executive director of UN Women
- Manjeev Singh Puri (born 1959), Indian civil servant of the Indian Foreign Service cadre and the former Ambassador of India to Nepal
- Naresh Puri (born 1970), Indian politician
- Raghunath Sahai Puri (1938–2007), Indian politician and Minister for Housing & Urban Development in Punjab Government
- Ranjeev Puri (born 1984), American state representative

== Singers ==
- Sanam Puri, lead vocalist of the independent music band SANAM, and Bollywood singer
- Samar Puri, guitarist in the band SANAM, popularly known as 'Flying Guitarist'; the sibling of Sanam Puri

== Science and academia ==
- Baij Nath Puri (1916–1996), Indian historian and author
- Harish Puri (born 1938), Indian political scientist and historian
- Ishwar Puri (born 1959), Indian-American and Canadian scientist, engineer, and academic
- Jyoti Puri, professor of sociology at Simmons University
- Madan Lal Puri (born 1929), Indian-American mathematician and statistician
- Manju Puri, Indian-American economics professor at Duke University and editor at the Review of Financial Studies. Currently he is the director of the American Finance Association.
- Munish Chander Puri (1939–2005), professor emeritus of mathematics at IIT Delhi
- Neel Kamal Puri (born 1956), Indian author and teacher
- Ruchir Puri, Indian-American scientist
- Sanjay Puri (born 1961), Indian statistical physicist

== Spirituality ==
- Harbhajan Singh Puri (1929–2004), spiritual director of the 3HO (Healthy, Happy, Holy Organization)

== Sports ==
- Abhinav Puri (born 1944), Indian cricketer
- Devraj Puri (1916–1971), Indian cricketer
- Gaurav Puri (born 1991), Indian cricketer
- Indu Puri (born 1953), Indian table tennis player
- Rishi Puri, Indian Sudoku champion
- Sangeeta Puri (born 1979), Indian Olympic swimmer
- Sunita Puri (died 2020), Indian field hockey player

== See also ==
- List of Khatris
