= Ghai =

Indian surname from Punjab

Ghai is a surname that is used by the Hindu and Sikh Khatri community of India.

== Notable people ==
- Anita Ghai (1958–2024), Indian academic
- Gaurav Ghei (born 1968), Indian golfer
- Kiran Ghai (born 1949), Indian politician and national vice president of the Bharatiya Janata Party
- Maleeka Ghai, Indian actress
- Rajinder Ghai (born 1960), Indian cricketer
- Rajiv Ghai, Indian general
- Shivani Ghai (born 1975), British Indian actress
- Subhash Ghai (born 1945), Indian film maker
- Ved Kumari Ghai (1931–2023), Indian Sanskrit scholar
- Yash Ghai (born 1938), Kenyan academic, constitutional scholar and Fellow of the British Academy
