= Kaushal =

- Gender: Male
- Language: Sanskrit, Bengali, Hindi

Origin
- Meaning: Clever
- Region of origin: India, Sri Lanka and Nepal

Other names
- Variant form: Kushal

Kaushal is a Hindu given name and surname common in India, Sri Lanka and Nepal.

== List of people ==
=== Given name ===
- Kaushal Acharjee, Indian cricketer
- Kaushal Inamdar, Indian singer
- Kaushal Kishore, Indian politician
- Kaushal Lokuarachchi, Sri Lankan cricketer
- Kaushal Silva, Sri Lankan cricketer
- Kaushal Singh, Indian cricketer
- Kaushal Kumar Verma, Indian mathematician
- Kaushal Yadav (soldier), Indian military commander

=== Surname ===
- Alka Kaushal, Indian actress
- Avdhash Kaushal, human rights activist
- Kamini Kaushal, Indian Actress
- Jagannath Kaushal, Indian politician
- Raj Kaushal, Indian director
- Swaraj Kaushal, Indian politician and lawyer
- Swati Kaushal, Indian author
- Tharindu Kaushal, Sri Lankan cricketer
- Vicky Kaushal, Indian actor
