= Rajpal =

Rajpal is a surname and a given name belonging to Khatri and Arora communities. Notable people with the name include:

Surname:

- Karam Rajpal, Indian television actor and a photographer
- Mahashay Rajpal, founder of Rajpal & Sons, an Indian publishing house in Delhi
- Monita Rajpal (born 1974), Canadian journalist
- Munisha Rajpal, Indian story, screenplay and dialogue writer
- Neha Rajpal (née Chandna) (born 1978), producer, singer and anchor in the Indian music industry
- Rohit Rajpal (born 1971), Indian professional tennis player
- Sushil Rajpal, Indian director and producer

Given name:

- Rajpal Abeynayake, the Editor in Chief of the Daily News (Sri Lanka)
- Rajpal Singh Baliyan, Indian politician, member of the Uttar Pradesh Assembly
- Rajpal Kashyap (born 1976), Indian politician, member of Uttar Pradesh Legislative Council
- Rajpal Singh Saini, Indian politician, Member of the Parliament of India representing Uttar Pradesh
- Rajpal Singh Shekhawat (born 1962), Indian politician, Member of the Rajasthan Legislative Assembly
- Rajpal Singh (born 1983), former captain of India national hockey team
- Rajpal Singh Sirohi (born 1943), Indian optics physicist, academic administrator, educator, researcher
- Rajpal Singh Yadav (born 1958), Indian scientist in the field of vector ecology and management
- Rajpal Yadav (born 1971), Indian actor and comedian

== See also ==
- Rajpal & Sons, an Indian publishing house in Delhi
