= Sobti (surname) =

Punjabi Khatri clan

Sobti is a Punjabi Khatri surname.

== Background ==
They were also found in the town of Alamgarh in Gujrat district. According to a local legend, a clan of Khatris, the Sobati, fought against Alexander the Great. Bhai Daya Singh, a Panj Pyara, was the first man to sacrifice his life for Guru Gobind Singh.

== Notable people ==
- Barun Sobti (born 1984), Indian model and actor
- Daya Singh (1661–1708), Sikh official, soldier and martyr
- Krishna Sobti (1925–2019), Indian Hindi-language fiction writer
- Praveen Kumar Sobti (1947–2022), Asian Games gold medalist in discus throw and hammer throw; Indian actor, politician and soldier
- Ranbir Chander Sobti (born 1948), Indian cell biologist, former vice chancellor of Panjab University, Chandigarh
- Romesh Sobti, Indian banker
- Tarun Sobti, Vice Admiral in the Indian Navy
