= Pruthi (surname) =

Pruthi is a Punjabi surname found among Punjabi Hindus and Punjabi Sikhs of the Khatri and Arora communities. While often identified with North Indian regions the name carries deep historical associations with the ancient warrior traditions of the Indian subcontinent.

== Etymology ==
The surname is traditionally believed to mean descendant of Great King Porus (also known as Purushottama or Pôros), the ancient Indian king who fought and defeated Alexander at the Battle of the Hydaspes in 326 BC. Historians suggest the name identifies its bearers as descendants of this lineage or the broader Pūru Vedic tribe. Others suggest a linguistic connection to the Sanskrit word Prithvi, meaning "earth".

== Distribution ==
Historically, members of the Pruthi clan belong to the Kshatriya varna. Following the Partition of India in 1947, many Pruthi families migrated from West Punjab to various parts of India, particularly Delhi, Haryana, and East Punjab. A small diaspora also exists in the Balkans, specifically in Kosovo.

== Notable people ==
- Hem Singh Pruthi, Indian entomologist and former Director of the Zoological Survey of India.

== See also ==
- Khatri
- Arora
