= Wahi (surname) =

Family name

Wahi is a Punjabi Khatri surname. According to Shyam Singh Shashi, they are related to the ancient clan of Bālhikas. They were found in Pindigheb and Rawalpindi in West Punjab.

== Notable people ==
- Adita Wahi, Indian actress
- Arushee Wahi, Indian swimmer & three-time winner of The Sheikh Hamdan Award
- Jasmine Wahi (born 1986), Indian-American curator, educator, and activist
- Karan Wahi (born 1986), Indian actor and host
- Prem Nath Wahi (1908–1991), Indian doctor, former director general of the Indian Council of Medical Research (ICMR)
- Purshottam Lal Wahi (1928–2000), Indian cardiologist
- Rakesh Wahi (born 1959), Indian military veteran and founder of CNBC Africa and Forbes Africa Magazine
- Satya Pal Wahi (died 2017), Indian army veteran, executive, former chairman at ONGC and CCI
- Sunayna Wahi (born 1990), Surinamese Surinder
- Tarun Kumar Wahi, Indian comic book artist and the chief writer for Raj Comics and creator of the superheroes Doga, Parmanu, Bheriya

== See also ==
- SEC v. Wahi, US insider trading case
