= Saund =

Saund is a surname. Notable people with the surname include:

- Dalip Singh Saund (1899–1973), American politician
- Daz Saund, British club DJ and Remixer, active 1988–present

== See also ==
- Sand (surname)
