= Mohindra =

Mohindra is an Indian name.

== People with the given name ==
- Mohindra Kumar Ghosh (born 1893), Indian politician

== List of people with the surname ==
- Anjli Mohindra (born 1990), British actress
- Atul Mohindra (born 1966), Indian former cricket player
- Brahm Mohindra (born 1946), Indian politician
- Gagan Mohindra (born 1978), British politician
- Vijat Mohindra (born 1985), American fashion photographer

== See also ==
- Mahendra
