= Manchanda =

Manchanda is a surname, commonly used in India. Manchanda are mostly Kshatriyas found in Punjab, Haryana, Himachal Pradesh and some parts of Uttrakhand. Manchanda is a surname found predominantly in northern India, especially in the states of Punjab, Haryana, and Delhi. The surname is associated with a number of Hindu communities, and its origins have been described in different ways across regional and historical contexts.

== Community Identification ==
According to community traditions and oral genealogies, some lineages bearing the Manchanda surname identify as part of the Khatri(Kshatriya) community and associate themselves with the Kshatriya varna of Hindu society. These traditions trace the community’s ancestry to the Suryavanshai (Solar Dynasty), which is historically linked to figures such as Lord Rama and King Ikshvaku.

This identification is largely based on cultural and familial narratives within the community. It is reflected in the usage of Rajput titles and adherence to Rajput customs in certain regions. However, the association has not been universally documented in scholarly or government classification systems.

Notable people with the surname include:

- Anushka Manchanda (born 1984), Indian singer, music producer, composer, actress, and former VJ
- Raj Manchanda (1945–2024), Indian squash player
- S. C. Manchanda, Indian cardiologist, and author
- Sunil Manchanda, Indian film director, producer, and advertisement producer

== See also ==
- Rajinder Manchanda Bani (1932–1981), Indian poet
