= Zahid Abrol =

Well-versed Indian Urdu poet (born 1950)

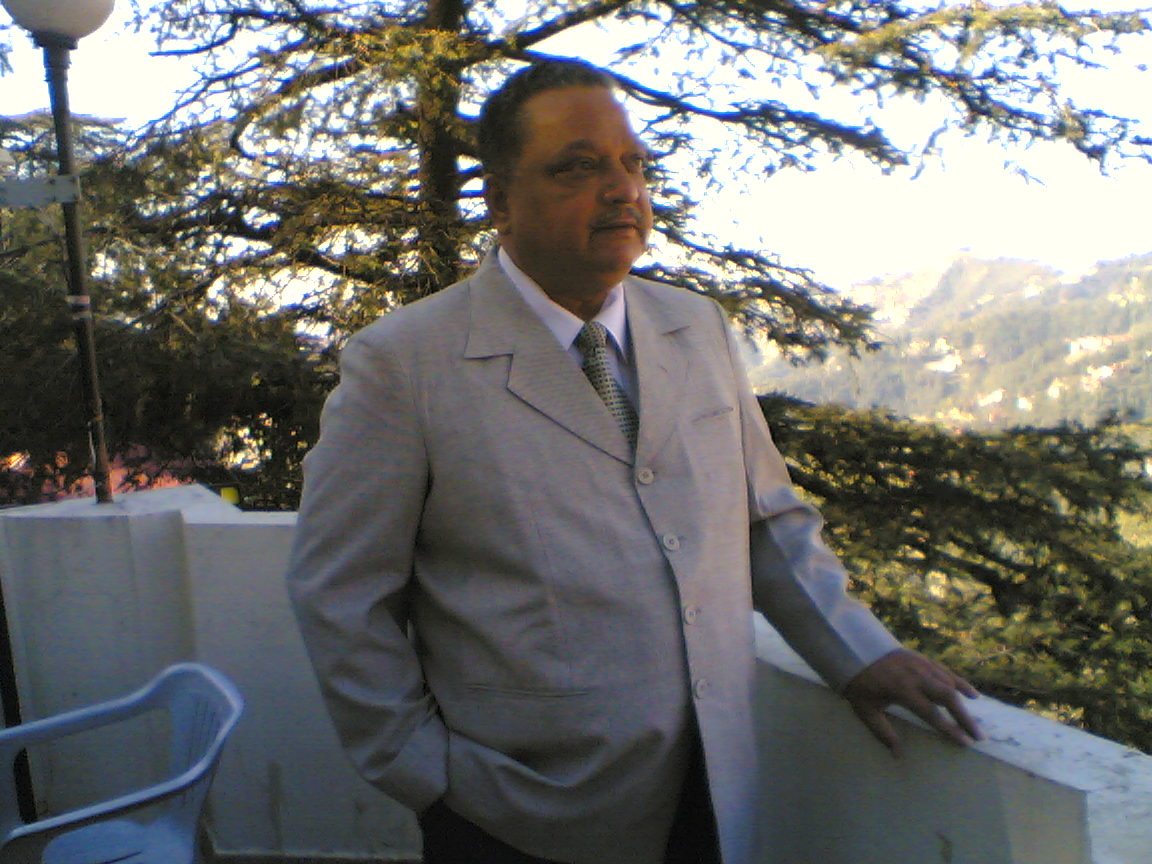
Zahid Abrol

Vijay Kumar Abrol, better known by his pen name Zahid Abrol, is an Indian Urdu poet who did the first Urdu translation of the 12th century Sufi-poet Baba Farid's shlokas and shabads.

== Poetic career ==
Andha Khuda was his first collection published in 1978 followed by Ek Saf-ha Purnam in 1986. His later publication is the poetic translated version, Faridnama, exhibits the original Gurmukhi version, its Roman transcript, Urdu translation in verse in Urdu and Devnagari scripts in a well produced volume and has won accolades from experts. This way he has reproduced tributes paid to Sheikh Baba Farid's poetry in all the three languages.

== Publications ==
- Andha Khuda – Jalandhar, Deepak Publishers, 1978
- Ek Saf-ha Purnam – Hoshiarpur, Charvak Publications, 1986
- Faridnama - Poetical Translation of Shiekh Farid's Punjabi Verses in Urdu and Hindi Scripts -[Delhi, Ajanta Books International, ISBN 978-81-202-0587-1, 2003
- Darya Darya Sahil Sahil - Urdu Ghazals in Urdu and Hindi separately, 2014/2015
- Khwabon Ke Ped Taley - Urdu Nazams in Urdu and Hindi separately, 2016
- A Three-Step Journey - Poetic translations of Zahid Abrol's selected Urdu Poetry into English by Dr. Lalit Mohan Sharma, 2016
