= Jagjeet (Jeet) S. Bindra =

Indian chemical engineer

Jagjeet (Jeet) Bindra is a director of Edison International and one of the United States’ largest electric utilities, Southern California Edison. Jeet is also a member of the board of directors of LyondellBasell and WorleyParsons. Jeet currently chairs the University of Washington College of Engineering Visiting Committee. In the past Jeet was a member of the board of directors of Transocean, Larsen & Toubro. Reliance Petroleum, GS Caltex and Caltex Australia (as CEO and managing director). His career has included several senior executive roles in refinery operations, refinery and upstream engineering, strategic planning, capital projects and engineering technology.

== Career ==
Edison International and Southern California Edison announced on April 22, 2010 Bindra's appointments to their boards. Edison International, headquartered in Rosemead, is the parent company of Southern California Edison.

Before his positions with Edison, Bindra served as president of Chevron Global Manufacturing from 2004 until he retired in 2009, during which time he led the company's worldwide manufacturing operations, including those of 19 refineries. His entire career at Chevron spanned 32 years and began with his work there as a research engineer and progressed through increasing levels of leadership.

During this time, he also served as president of Chevron Pipeline Co. (1997–2002), senior vice president of Pipelines, Chevron Overseas Petroleum (1995–1997) and managing director and CEO of Caltex Australia (2002–2003). In addition to his positions with Edison, Bindra is on the board of directors of Larsen & Toubro, India; Transfield Services, Australia and Sriya Innovations, Kennesaw, Georgia; and chairs the board of directors at the IIT Kanpur Foundation.

Bindra's responsibilities have spanned North America, Europe, Africa, Russia, Kazakhstan, Korea, Thailand, Singapore, Australia and India. One of his more notable international achievements was successfully negotiating the development of a U.S. $2.8 billion pipeline from the Tengiz Field in Western Kazakhstan to the Black Sea.

== Early life ==
Jeet grew up in India. After earning his Bachelor of Technology degree with distinction in chemical engineering from Indian Institute of Technology, Kanpur in 1969, he moved to the United States and earned his master's degree in chemical engineering from the University of Washington in Seattle, Washington, in 1970. He is a "Distinguished Alumnus" of University of Washington, College of Engineering, as well as of Indian Institutes of Technology, Kanpur.

Jeet Bindra also holds a Master of Business Administration (honors) from Saint Mary's College of California.

Jeet Bindra is a graduate of the London Business School's Senior Executive Program and has served with many professional organizations, including the American Institute of Chemical Engineers, the Construction Industry Institute, the American Petroleum Institute and the Construction Industry Institute.
