= Narula =

Surname of Indian origin

Narula is a surname. Notable people with the surname are listed below:

- Aki Narula (born 1968), Indian fashion designer
- Harpinder Singh Narula (born 1953), UK-based Indian businessman
- Herman Narula (born 1988), British businessman
- Jaspinder Narula, Punjabi singer and Bollywood playback singer
- Mukesh Narula (born 1962), Indian cricketer
- Nirmaljit Singh Narula, Indian spiritual leader
- Poonam Narula (born 1976), Indian actress
- Prince Narula, Indian model and television personality
- Rajneesh Narula (born 1963), British economist and academic
- Ranjit Singh Narula (1908–2005), Indian judge

== See also ==
- Narula Institute of Technology, private engineering college in Kolkata, West Bengal, India
