= Dhir Singh Pundir =

Rajput vassal

- Raja Dhir Singh Pundir
- Born: Saharanpur
- Died: Lahore
- House: Suryavanshi • Pundir
- Dynasty: Chahamana dynasty
- Father: Chandra Pundir

Dhir Singh Pundir (also known as Dheer Singh Pundir) was a Rajput vassal associated with the Chahamana (Chauhan) dynasty during the reign of Emperor Prithviraj Chauhan.

Regional historical accounts describe him as a military commander and feudatory of the Chauhans, with responsibilities in the north-western frontier regions of the Chahamana realm.

Later traditions associate members of the Pundir Rajput clan with resistance against early Ghurid incursions into northern India during the late 12th century, particularly during conflicts involving Muhammad of Ghor. These narratives are primarily derived from regional histories rather than contemporary court chronicles.

According to later regional and clan-based records, following the defeat of Prithviraj Chauhan in 1192 CE, Dhir Singh Pundir is said to have withdrawn from major military affairs and focused on the administration and welfare of deprived rural communities in areas corresponding to present-day Haridwar and Saharanpur. These accounts emphasize his role in local governance and protection of vulnerable populations, though such details are not corroborated by contemporary historical sources.

The Pundir clan were allies and vassals of the Chauhan dynasty. Genealogical traditions describe Dhir Singh Pundir as the elder son of Chandra (or Chand) Pundir, a regional ruler associated with the Haridwar region. Claims regarding close marital alliances with Prithviraj Chauhan are mentioned in later traditions but lack firm corroboration.
