= Nand Katyal =

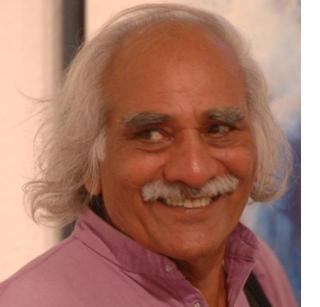
- Born: January 30, 1935; Lahore, Pakistan
- Died: December 16, 2024
- Website: www.nandkatyal.com

Nand Katyal (born January 30, 1935, in Lahore), is an Indian artist. His family came to Delhi from Lahore after Partition, and settled there when he was around twelve years of age. His father, Ram Lal Katyal, was himself a painter. Hence Nand was exposed to art materials and the art circle of Lahore at an early age. He studied Fine Art at the Polytechnic in Delhi and worked as an art teacher. In the early 1960s, Katyal joined the American Center and served as the art director of Span magazine for many years before turning to art as a freelance practitioner.

He served as the secretary of Delhi Silpi Chakra for the period 1963–1967 and was the director of 10th Triennale India in 2001. He was part of the five-member jury for National Awards of Lalit Kala Akademi in 2004. Katyal was awarded with the National Award in 1995, and was given a Felicitation, 10th Rashtriya Kala Mela, in 1997.

His one-man shows have been held in various galleries including Shridharani in Delhi and Cymroza in Mumbai, and he has also participated in various group shows, including some international workshops and camps. His work has been exhibited in important national exhibitions as well as the Triennale and other international shows. His works can be seen in the collections of the National Gallery of Modern Art in Delhi, Bharat Bhavan, Bhopal and with other institutions and individuals in the country.

Nand Katyal lives in Delhi and works from his studio at Garhi.

| Year | Solo exhibitions and significant group shows |
|---|---|
| 2012 | Uttarayan Art Centre Camp, Baroda |
| 2006 | Lalit Kala Akademi Art Camp, Lakshadweep |
| 2004 & 09 | Art Heritage, New Delhi (Solo shows) |
| 2003 | ITDC Art Camp, Ladakh |
| 1998 | Art Motif Pastel Show, New Delhi |
| 1996 | Art Alive Gallery: Group Shows and Camps, New Delhi |
| 1995 | "Art and Nature: Two Renewable Resources", Buddha Jayanti Park, New Delhi |
| 1992 | ECymroza Gallery, Mumbai (Solo show) |
| 1985 | Festival of India: Exhibit Designer on Indian Architecture, Paris |
| 1982 | Triennale, New Delhi |
| 1978 & 97 | Dhoomimal Gallery Annual and Group Shows |
| 1976, 79 & 88 | Dhoomimal Gallery (Solo shows) |
| 1975 | Black Patridge Gallery Art Camp, New Delhi |
| 1971 | Kunika Chemould Gallery (Solo show) |
| 1967, 91 & 95 | Shridharani Gallery, New Delhi (Solo shows) |
| 1963-65 | Delhi Silpi Chakra |
| 1962 | Delhi Silpi Chakra (Solo show) |
| 1959, 62 & 68 | Exhibited in National Exhibitions of Lalit Kala Akademi |
