= Hemi Bawa =

Indian painter and sculptor

- Born: Delhi, India
- Occupations: Painter sculptor
- Known for: Modern art
- Spouse: Inderjit Singh Bawa
- Awards: Padma Shri
- Website: Website

Hemi Bawa (born 1948) is an Indian painter and sculptor. Her works include acrylic and glass paintings and sculptures made of cast glass, fibre glass and copper-fired glass.

== Early life ==
Bawa was born in Delhi and did not have any formal training when she started painting in 1962. Later, she studied Scandinavian glassmaking techniques and started working on that medium and also in combination with metal, wood and acrylic.

In 1996, Coca-Cola commissioned her for a sculpture, to be displayed during the 1996 Summer Olympics in Atlanta and the eight-foot high work is now on display at the Coca-Cola Museum in the city. She has had solo and group exhibitions in India and abroad, including the Glass Dimension show and India Art Fair 2012 in Delhi.

The Government of India awarded her the fourth highest civilian honour of the Padma Shri, in 2009, for her contributions to Arts. Her life and works have been documented in Hemi Bawa, a book by Alka Pande, published in 2010. She is married to Inderjit Singh Bawa, an industrialist, and the couple lives in Delhi, along Hailey Road.
