= Alagh =

Alagh is a surname. Notable people with the surname include:

- Anjori Alagh (born 1981), Indian actress and model
- Maya Alagh, Indian television actress
- Sunil Alagh, Indian businessman
- Yoginder K Alagh (born 1939), Indian economist
