= Saluja =

Saluja is an Indian surname.

It may refer to:

- Radha Saluja, Indian actress
- Renu Saluja (1952–2000), Indian film editor
- Roopak Saluja (born 1975), Indian businessman
- Sapreet Kaur Saluja (born 1976), American civil rights activist
