= Kaushal Kumar Verma =

Indian mathematician

- Born: 7 March 1971 (age 54)
- Citizenship: India
- Known for: Complex analysis
- Awards: Shanti Swarup Bhatnagar Prize, 2014 B.M. Birla Science Award, 2009

Kaushal Kumar Verma (born 7 March 1971) is an Indian mathematician who specializes in complex analysis. He earned a B.Tech degree in engineering physics from IIT Bombay in 1992. He then obtained a PhD in mathematics from Indiana University Bloomington, and also worked at Syracuse University for a year, followed by working at the University of Michigan, Ann Arbor, for 3 years. He was awarded the Shanti Swarup Bhatnagar Prize in 2014. He is a mathematics professor and dean of mathematical and physical sciences at Indian Institute of Science, Bangalore.
