= Rawail =

Rawail is a given name and surname. Notable people with the given name and surname include:

== Surname ==
- Harnam Singh Rawail (1921–2004), Indian filmmaker
- Rahul Rawail (born 1951), Indian film director
- Rajat Rawail, Indian film producer, director and actor

== Given name ==
- Rawail Singh (born 1956), Indian academic and Professor of Punjabi at Delhi University
