= Kharbanda =

Kharbanda is a surname. Notable people with this surname include:

- Kriti Kharbanda (born 1990), Indian actress
- Kulbhushan Kharbanda (born 1944), Indian actor
- Sikandar Kharbanda (born 1979), Indian television actor
