= Vig (surname) =

Family name

Vig is an Indian (Punjab): Hindu Kshatriya and Sikh surname.

== Vig's and Sanskrit ==
Vig is derived from the Sanskrit word Vijñāna. Vijñāna (Sanskrit: विज्ञान) or viññāṇa (Pali: विञ्ञाण) is translated as "consciousness", "life force", "mind", or "discernment".

The term vijñāna is mentioned in many early Upanishads, where it has been translated by terms such as understanding, knowledge, and intelligence.

In the Pāli Canon's Sutta Pitaka's first four nikāyas, Vijñāna is one of three overlapping Pali terms used to refer to the mind, the others being manas and citta. Each is used in the generic and non-technical sense of "mind" in general, but the three are sometimes used in sequence to refer to one's mental processes as a whole. Their primary uses are, however, distinct.

== Vig's and Kashmir Shaivism ==
Vigs were descendants of the followers of the Vigyan Bhairav Tantra (Sometimes spelled Vijñāna-bhairava-tantra) tradition. This is a Shiva Tantra, of the Kaula Trika tradition of Kashmir Shaivism. Kashmir Shaivism, is a nondualist Hindu tradition of Shaiva-Shakta Tantra which originated in Kashmir sometime after 850 CE. Since this tradition originated in Kashmir, it is often called "Kashmiri Shaivism".

The institutional basis and support for the Kashmir Shaivism tradition mostly disappeared with Islamic conquests of the region leading to the slow decline and contraction of the tradition (thought it continued to be passed down and practiced well into the 18th century).

== Vig's and Sikhism ==
Although originating as Kashmiri Hindus that followed the tradition of Kashmir Shaivism, during the time of Guru Nanak's Third Udasi: (1514-1518 AD), Guru Nanak visited the 5000 year old Shiva Amarnath temple in 1516/17 while on his way back from Mount Kailash to Punjab where he had discussions on spirituality and religion with the Hindu Kashmiri Pundits there. Around this time period, many Vig Hindus sought the path of Sikhism through Guru Nanak's teachings.

In May 1675, a congregation of Kashmiri Pundits requested help against Aurangzeb's oppressive policies, and Guru Tegh Bahadur decided to protect their rights. According to Trilochan Singh in Guru Tegh Bahadur: Prophet and Martyr, the convoy of Kashmiri Pandits who tearfully pleaded with the Guru at Anandpur were 500 in number and were led by a certain Pandit Kirpa Ram, who recounted tales of religious oppression under the governorship of Iftikhar Khan.

The Kashmiri Pandits decided to meet with the Guru after they first sought the assistance of Shiva at the Amarnath Temple, where one of them is said to have had a dream where Shiva instructed the Pandits to seek out the ninth Sikh guru for assistance in their plight and hence a group was formed for carrying out the task. Guru Tegh Bahadur left from his base at Makhowal to confront the persecution of Kashmiri Pandits by Mughal officials but was arrested at Ropar and put to jail in Sirhind. Four months later, in November 1675, he was transferred to Delhi and asked to perform a miracle to prove his nearness to God or convert to Islam. The Guru declined, and three of his colleagues, who had been arrested with him, were tortured to death in front of him: Bhai Mati Das was sawn into pieces, Bhai Dayal Das was thrown into a cauldron of boiling water, and Bhai Sati Das was burned alive. Thereafter on 11 November, Tegh Bahadur was publicly beheaded in Chandni Chowk, a market square close to the Red Fort.

During this interaction with Guru Tegh Bahadur, many Kashmiri Hindus and followers of Kashmir Shaivism sough the path of Sikhism.

== Notable people ==
- Chahat Vig, Indian actress
- Gautam Vig (born 1987), Indian model and actor
- Khushwant Lal Wig (1904–1986), Indian doctor, medical researcher, administrator and writer
- Mohindar Lal Whig (born 1925), Indian brigadier
- N. N. Wig (1930–2018), Indian psychiatrist
- Renu Vig, Indian computer scientist, academic and professor
