= Chunni Lal Khetrapal =

Indian chemical physicist (1937–2021)

- Born: 25 August 1937; Uttar Pradesh, British Raj
- Died: 21 July 2021 (aged 83)
- Education: Allahabad University; Atomic Energy Establishment Training School; Tata Institute of Fundamental Research; Bombay University; University of Basel; Kent State University
- Known for: Studies on Nuclear magnetic resonance spectroscopy
- Awards: 1982 Shanti Swarup Bhatnagar Prize; 1996 UGC C. V. Raman Award; 1998 Goyal Prize; 1996 Goyal Prize; 2002 ISCA P. C. Ray Memorial Medal; 2005 ICS Lifetime Achievement Award
- Scientific career
- Fields: Chemical physics; Nuclear magnetic resonance spectroscopy
- Workplaces: National Institutes of Health; Raman Research Institute; Indian Institute of Science; Allahabad University; Sanjay Gandhi Postgraduate Institute of Medical Sciences; Centre of Biomedical Magnetic Resonance

Chunni Lal Khetrapal (25 August 1937 – 21 July 2021) was an Indian chemical physicist and a vice chancellor of the Allahabad University. He was known for his studies in chemical physics, particularly in the field of Nuclear magnetic resonance spectroscopy. He was an elected fellow of the Indian National Science Academy and the National Academy of Sciences, India. The Council of Scientific and Industrial Research, the apex agency of the Government of India for scientific research, awarded him the Shanti Swarup Bhatnagar Prize for Science and Technology, one of the highest Indian science awards, in 1982, for his contributions to chemical sciences.

== Biography ==
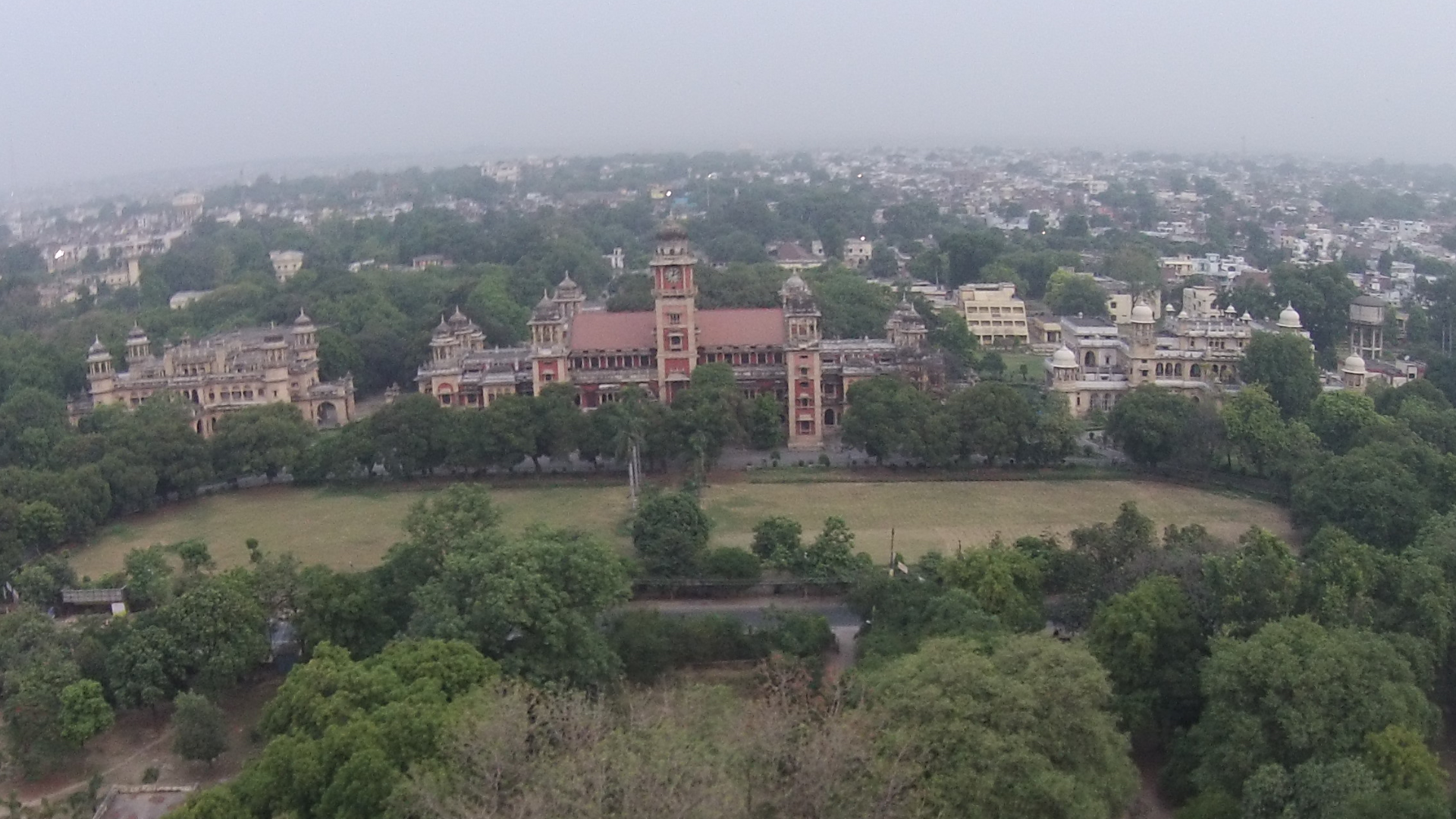
University of Allahabad

C. L. Khetrapal, born on 25 August 1937 in the Indian state of Uttar Pradesh, did his college studies at the Allahabad University from where he graduated in 1957 and completed his master's degree in 1959. He started his career by joining the Atomic Energy Establishment Training School, Mumbai the same year, simultaneously doing his doctoral research at Mumbai University to secure a PhD in 1965. In between, he worked at the Tata Institute of Fundamental Research under S. S. Dharmatti for a while and moved to Switzerland where he did his post-doctoral studies at the University of Basel from 1967 till 1969. Then he shifted his base to the US to work at the Liquid Crystal Institute of Kent State University as a research assistant. He returned to India in 1973 and joined the Raman Research Institute as an assistant professor where he spent over eleven years till his move to the Indian Institute of Science as a professor and the head of the Sophisticated Instruments Facility in 1984. On his superannuation from service in 1998, he was appointed the vice chancellor of the Allahabad University. When his tenure ended in 2001, he joined the Sanjay Gandhi Postgraduate Institute of Medical Sciences as a distinguished professor for a five-year term (2001–06) and also held the directorship of Centre of Biomedical Magnetic Resonance, Lucknow, an autonomous research centre of the Government of Uttar Pradesh. In between, he had two stints at the National Institutes of Health as a visiting scientist during 1979–80 and in 1984.

== Legacy ==
Using nuclear magnetic resonance spectroscopy (NMR), Khetrapal studied the molecular orientation in the nematic phase of liquid crystals, the non-planar distortions in peptides in the liquid phase and weak molecular interactions involved in hydrogen bonding. Apart from pioneering NMR studies in India, he established the Institute of Interdisciplinary Studies and the Institute of Professional Studies at Allahabad University. His contributions are also reported to be behind the establishment of the National Centre on NMR in Bangalore. He has published a number of articles and books, besides contributing chapters to books published by others including the 8-volume Encyclopedia of Nuclear Magnetic Resonance. He was one of the founders of the National Magnetic Resonance Society and the Centre of Biomedical Magnetic Resonance and served as the first president of the former and was an incumbent director of the latter.

== Awards and honors ==
The Council of Scientific and Industrial Research awarded Deb the Shanti Swarup Bhatnagar Prize, one of the highest Indian science awards, in 1982. He is also a recipient of the C. V. Raman Award of the University Grants Commission of India (1996), Goyal Prize (1996), P. C. Ray Memorial Medal of the Indian Science Congress Association (2002) and the Lifetime Achievement Award of the Indian Chemical Society (2005). He has delivered several award orations including the R. K. Asundi Memorial Lecture Award of the Indian National Science Academy in 1990 and N. R. Dhar Memorial Lecture Award of National Academy of Sciences, India in 2005. He was an elected fellow of the Indian National Science Academy and the National Academy of Sciences, India.

== See also ==
- Nuclear magnetic resonance spectroscopy
