= Khukhrain =

Khatri clan

- Khokhrain

Profile
- Region: Punjab
- Ethnicity: Punjabi
- Khukhrain no longer has a chief, and is an armigerous clan
- Historic seat: Bhera

The Khukhrain or Khokhrain is a sub-group composed of eight clans of the Khatri caste that originally hailed from the areas of the Salt Range in northern Punjab.

== History and religion ==
The Khukhrains were historically spread over Khushab, Chakwal, Pind Dadan Khan, Peshawar, Nowshera and Lahore. The Indian historian Baij Nath Puri believes that their origin lies among those Khatris who supported Khokhars under Jasrath Khokhar during his power struggle against Delhi Sultanate, explaining why they formed a distinct subgroup of their own.

The Khukhrain clans were originally Hindu. Later clan members embraced Sikhism and Islam. Khukhrains of all these faiths collectively form one kinship. In Pakistan there continues to be a large number of Muslim Khukhrains, living especially in the Pakistani Punjab. Some scholars such as Muhammad Ikram Chughtai believe that a number of Khukhrains were converted to Islam by the Sufi saint Baba Farid.

== Clans ==
- Anand : Named after a common ancestor "Ananda" which translates to "joy" in Sanskrit.
- Bhasin : They were mostly concentrated in Rawalpindi district (1208 families) according to 1881 Census of India conducted by British.
- Chadha : According to a local account, the ancestors of Chadhas fought with Babur in a war. However, all of them died except for one man who hid behind an aak bush. This person continued the progeny of the Chadha clan. To pay tribute to the aak bush which saved the Chadha clan from extinction, the Chadhas visit Eminabad in Gujranwala district to perform prayers and worship the Aak tree as a former tradition
- Chandhoke (Chandhok) : They were concentrated in Peshawar and Kabul.
- Ghai :They are mentioned in Bhai Gurdas's Vaar 11 ਵਡਾ ਭਗਤੁ ਹੈ ਭਾਈਅੜਾ ਗੋਇੰਦੁ ਘੇਈ ਗੁਰੂ ਦੁਆਰੇ। (Translation : Bhaiara and Govind are devotees belonging to Ghai sub-caste. They remain at the door of the Guru.)
- Sabharwal : The sub-caste is also mentioned in Bhai Gurdas's Vaar 11 "ਸਨਮੁਖ ਭਾਈ ਤੀਰਥਾ ਸਭਰਵਾਲ ਸਭੇ ਸਿਰਦਾਰਾ।" (Translation : Bhai Tirtha was the leader among all the Sikhs of Sabharval sub- caste.)
- Sahni (Sawhney) :The Sahnis were the inhabitants of Bhera town located on the eastern bank of Jhelum River prior to the partition of India. Sahni families were also the governors of Wazirabad tehsil. According to B.N Puri, Sahni is derived from "Senani" meaning "general of an army"
- Sethi : According to B.N Puri, Sethi is derived from "shrestha" meaning "the headman"
- Suri : As per Baij Nath Puri, Suri translates to "hero"

== See also ==
- Hinduism in Punjab
- List of Khatris
