= Sarna (Polish surname) =

Sarna is a Polish surname. Notable people with the surname include:

- Angelika Sarna (born 1997), Polish athlete
- Jonathan Sarna (born 1955), American historian
- John Sarna (1935–2021), American politician
- Linda Sarna, American nursing researcher and academic
- Mirosława Sarna (born 1942), Polish athlete
- Nahum Sarna (1923–2005), American Bible scholar
- Paweł Sarna (canoeist) (born 1984), Polish slalom canoeist
- Paweł Sarna (poet) (born 1977), Polish writer and academic
- Yehuda Sarna, Canadian-American rabbi
