= Tangri =

Tangri may refer to:

- Tangri (god) or Tengri a Turkic pagan celestial chief divinity who personifies Heaven
  - Tengrism, the religion centred on the deity
- Tangri river, a seasonal river in Haryana, India
- Jyotica Tangri, Indian singer
- Nina Tangri, Indian-Canadian politician
- Roger Tangri (born 1941), British professor of political science
- Sandra Schwartz Tangri (1936–2003), American feminist psychologist
