= Nagpal =

Nagpal (snake protector) is an Indian surname of Sanskrit origin. Notable people with the name include:

- Amitosh Nagpal, Indian film actor, screenwriter and lyricist
- Deepshikha Nagpal (born 1968), Indian actress
- Devendra Nagpal, Indian politician
- Durga Shakti Nagpal (born 1985), Indian civil servant
- Harish Nagpal (born 1964), Indian politician
- Harit Nagpal (born 1961), Indian businessman
- Mahander Nagpal (born 1959), Indian politician
- Nisha Nagpal, Indian television actress
- Nirmala Nagpal, Indian dance choreographer
- Radhika Nagpal, Indian computer scientist
- Smriti Nagpal, Indian TV presenter
- Simba Nagpal, Indian actor and model
- Vinod Nagpal, Indian film actor and classical singer
