= Duggal =

Surname of Indian origin

Duggal (or Dugal) is a surname used by Punjabi Khatris.

== Origin ==
According to historian Baij Nath Puri, Duggal is derived from Dourgal who were people connected with a fort and its security.

== Notable ==
Notable people who bear the name Duggal, who may or may not be associated with the Khatri caste, include:

- Diamond Duggal (DJ Swami), British-Indian music producer, composer, sound designer and multi-instrumentalist
- Kartar Duggal (1917–2012), Indian journalist, writer, intellectual and authority on Sikhism
- Mukesh Duggal, Indian film producer who produced movies like Gopi Kishan and Saathi
- Pavan Duggal, Advocate at the Supreme Court of India, New Delhi
- Rajendra Krishan Duggal (1919–1987), Indian poet, lyricist and songwriter
- Rajneesh Duggal (born 1979), Indian model, Mr. India 2003
- Rasika Dugal (born 1985), Indian actress
- Rohit Duggal (1976–1992), British teenage murder victim
- Shefali Razdan Duggal (born 1971), Indian-American political activist
- Sunil Duggal, Indian entrepreneur and business executive, CEO at Dabur
- Sunita Duggal (born 1968), Indian politician and MP of Sirsa
- Vinod Kumar Duggal (born 1944), Indian politician and bureaucrat
