= Charles Hans =

French cyclist

Personal information
- Born: 9 August 1892
- Died: 2 January 1951 (aged 58)

Cycling career
- Sport: Cycling
- Role: Rider

Charles Hans (9 August 1892 – 2 January 1951) was a French racing cyclist. He rode in the 1921 Tour de France.
