= Vij =

Indian Khatri surname

Vij is an Indian surname of the Khatri community.

== Notable people ==
Notable people with the surname include:

- Amit Vij (born 1977), Indian politician
- Anil Vij (born 1953), Indian politician
- Bharati Vij (born 1967), Indian cricketer
- Deepak Balraj Vij, Indian film director
- Kirpa Ram Vij (1935–2022), Singaporean civil servant
- Mahii Vij (born 1982), Indian model and actress
- Manav Vij (born 1977), Indian actor
- Meher Vij, Indian actress
- Nirmal Chander Vij (born 1943), Indian Chief of Army Staff
- Parmod Kumar Vij, Indian politician
- Rajinder Kumar Vij (born 1939), Indian sport shooter
- Rama Vij, Indian actress
- Riya Vij (born 1998), Indian actress
- R K Vij (born 1961), Indian policeman
- Sourabh Vij (born 1987), Indian shot putter
- Swami Shraddhanand (born Munshi Ram Vij, 1856 - 1926), Hindu guru and activist
- Vikram Vij (born 1964), Indian-born Canadian chef

== See also ==
- Vij's Restaurant, an Indian restaurant in Vancouver, Canada
