= Trehan =

Hamlet in Cornwall, England

Coordinates: 50°24′00″N 4°14′50″W

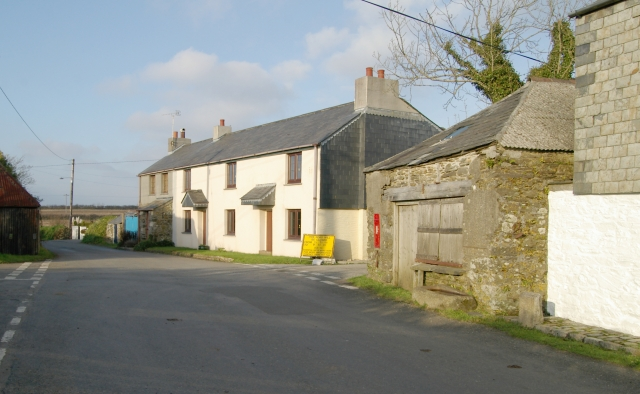
Longlands Cross, near Trehan

Trehan is a hamlet near Saltash in Cornwall, England, United Kingdom.
