= Soi (surname) =

Soi is a surname. Notable people with the surname include:

- Brian Soi (born 1985), American football defensive tackle
- Edwin Soi (born 1986), Kenyan runner
