= Nārag =

Narang Syedan
- Village
- Narang Syedan
- Location within Pakistan
- Coordinates: 33.17°N 72.76°E
- Country: Pakistan
- Province: Punjab
- District: Chakwal
- Time zone: UTC+5 (PST)

Nārang Syedan (also Nārag Syedan; Narag or Narang) is a village of Chakwal District in the Punjab province of Pakistan. Its postal code is 48721.

It is famous for its ancient saints (Awliyas). There are many saints buried in this land. The famous are Syed Haji Ameen Bad Sha, Syed Haider Shah Bad Sha (Bagh Wale) and Syed Wali Bad Sha. These saints died between the 16th to 19th centuries. They are considered to be descendants of Syed Sakhi Shah Ishaq (Dhudial) whose maternal grandfather is Sher Shah Sori (Emperor of Sub-Continent).

It has natural sceneries such as water canals, berry trees, rosewood, eucalyptus, red mud dunes, and green full place Bagh. Buildings like Darbar Syed Haider Shah Bad Sha (Bagh Wale), Darbar Syed Haji Ameen, Darbar Syed Wali, Imambargahs and mosques play a key role.

Its weather is mostly severe (hot in summers and cold in winters). Mostly people here do farming for their livelihood.

The education quality is poor. Only a few goes for higher education there.

Health facilities are provided through private clinics at basic level.
