= Ambica Beri =

Indian art gallery owner

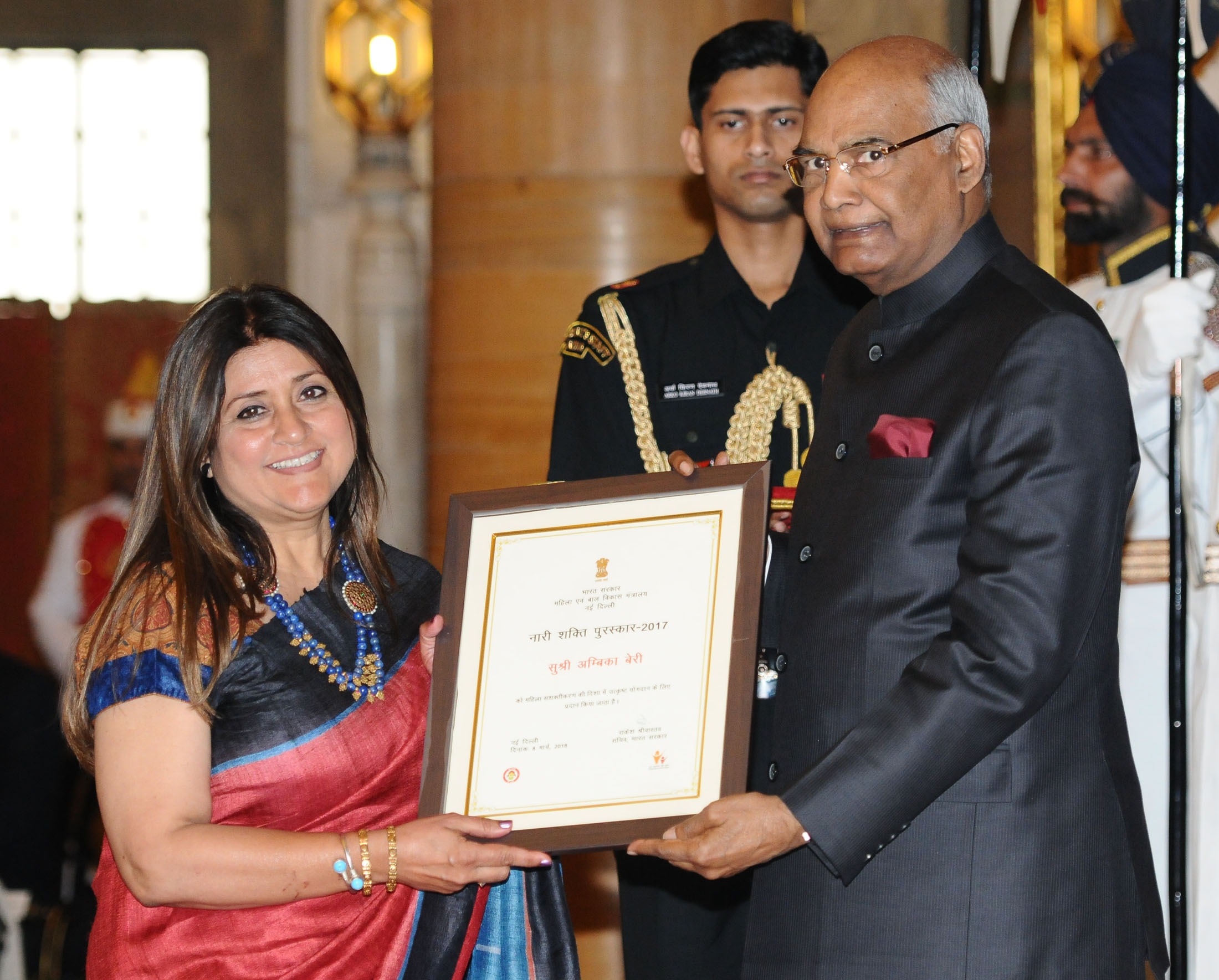
- Born: Ambica Subherwal
- Occupation: art gallery owner
- Known for: establishing a retreat for artists

Ambica Beri born Ambica Subherwal is an Indian art gallery owner. She was awarded the Nari Shakti Puraskar in 2018 for establishing a retreat for artists.

== Life ==
Ambica Subherwal was interested in art as a girl. Her father was an architect.

Beri is known as an art gallery owner. Her gallery opened in about 1990 and is known as Gallery Sanskriti and it is in Kolkata.

Beri established a retreat for artists. It is called "Art Ichol" and it was said to be "India’s only permanent creative retreat for artists, writer and sculptors". The retreat is in the small village of Ichal which is 140 km from the tourist area of Khajuraho.

Beri restored the house of Allauddin Khan who was a Bengali sarod player, multi-instrumentalist and composer who lived in Maihar. This house makes up one of three parts - the other two are the artists retreat and there is another, Amariya, for writers. The facility includes a three-acre sculpture park that is laden with work on display including a statue of Allauddin Khan playing the sarod.

Beri was awarded the "highest civilian honour for women" known as the Nari Shakti Puraskar in 2018. On International Women's Day2018 Beri was awarded the Nari Shakti Puraskar. The award was made by the President of India Ram Nath Kovind at the Presidential Palace (Rastrapati Bhavan) in New Delhi with the Prime Minister of India, Narendra Modi and the Minister for Women & Child Development, Maneka Sanjay Gandhi also attending. About 30 people and nine organisations were honoured that year, receiving the award and a prize each of $R 100,000.
