= Prerna Singh Bindra =

Wildlife conservationist and author from India

- Other names: Prerna Bindra
- Occupations: Environmentalist, journalist
- Years active: 2006

Prerna Singh Bindra from Gurgaon, India is one of India's leading environmental journalists and travel writers. She is also a visiting faculty member at National Centre for Biological Sciences and has received the Carl Zeiss Wildlife Conservation Award.

== Education ==
Prerna holds a Masters in Labour Welfare from Gujarat University and has done graduate work in Economics at St Xaviers (Ahmedabad).

== Career ==
=== Author and writer ===
She started her career in management from Indian Institute of Management, Ahmedabad as a Research Associate. After she found that her true call calling was writing, she started writing from Sanctuary Asia. Later she worked on daily newspapers The Asian Age, The Pioneer, The Times of India and others.

Prerna authored more than 1,500 articles on nature and wildlife in mainstream media. Prerna took to concentrating on working with governments at the local, regional and federal levels, to conserve India's wildlife and wild habitats through policy and legal reform, the promotion of education and awareness, and by supporting effective action on the ground.

She is the editor of Tigerlink, a journal which collates and analyses information about tigers from across their range countries.

=== Positions served ===
Prerna has served on the Uttarakhand State Board for Wildlife and was a member of the National Board for Wildlife and part of its core Standing Committee between 2010 and 2013. She is part of the team of the National Tiger Conservation Authority (NTCA) to assess the management effectiveness of tiger reserves in an IUCN framework.

She was part of the committee appointed by the Ministry of Tourism to study relevant issues concerning tourism and wildlife in Uttarakhand which ultimately led to the creation of buffers around reserves and guidelines for tourism for tiger reserves.

== Awards ==
- 2007 ABN-AMRO Sanctuary Asia Wildlife Service Award, for in-depth and consistent coverage of conservation issues
- 2007 Carl Zeiss Wildlife Conservation Award
- 2012 Nominated for International Visitor Leadership Program
- 2014 Chevening-Gurukul Scholarship for Leadership & Excellence

== Books ==
- 2006 The King and I: Travels in Tigerland
- 2010 Voices in the Wilderness
- 2017 The Vanishing India's wildlife crisis.
- 2017 When I Grow Up I Want to be a Tiger
