= Avinash Pasricha =

Indian photographer

Avinash Pasricha is an Indian photographer who has predominantly worked with and photographed Indian classical artists.
