= Prakash Tandon =

Prakash Tandon (1911–2004) was an influential Indian business leader in the second half of the 20th century. He attained fame for his classical account of Punjabi life in the autobiographical book Punjabi Century, the first part of a trilogy of which the next two parts were Beyond Punjab and Return to Punjab.

He directed Hindustan Lever during the important transitional phase of Indian management. He was the first Indian Chairman of Hindustan Lever Ltd. (now known as Hindustan Unilever Ltd.). A Chartered Accountant, trained in London, he was one of the pioneers of professional management in India. He served as the chairman of the State Trading Corporation and Punjab National Bank and is credited with earning distinction as a CEO who for his systems, efficiency and honesty in running PSU's. In 1974 Reserve Bank of India constituted a study group headed by Shri Prakash Tandon (then Chairman of Punjab National Bank), with a view to study the entire gamut of Bank's finance for working capital and suggest ways for optimum utilization of Bank credit. This was the first elaborate attempt by the central bank to organise the Bank credit. The report of this group is widely known as Tandon Committee report. Most banks in India even today continue to look at the needs of the corporates in the light of methodology recommended by the Group.

== Biography ==
Prakash Tandon is son of a civil engineer and born in a canal colony in the Punjab. His autobiographical writings, published in the second half of the twentieth century, give vivid accounts of life in Punjab from the late nineteenth century. Following schooling in Gujrat (Punjab) and Lahore Government College, Tandon sailed for Britain in 1929, aged eighteen years old. His elder brother, Manohar, was already in London. Tandon enrolled at Manchester University with the view to become a Chartered Accountant(CA), of which there were very few qualified Indians at the time.

Tandon spent eight years in Britain. He got involved in the University debating team, and following his degree at Manchester stayed in London to pursue some economics research and his accountancy qualifications. At a students' congress in Oxford, he met his future wife, a Swedish woman, Gärd.

In 1937, Tandon returned to India. He settled in Bombay and he eventually got a job at Unilever. Despite his accountancy qualification, Tandon was employed in the advertising department and earnt less than his British colleagues. He eventually became director of Unilever in 1951. He had become a member of the first board of Hindustan Lever in 1956 and then the first Indian Chairman in 1961. Tandon was an extremely influential business leader in independent India, and one of the pioneers of professional management in India.

In the Punjabi Century (in 1961), Tandon describes the period of the British Raj as a "benevolent bureaucracy which gave much opportunity for building and therefore attracted men who liked pioneering..." Tandon goes on to write about his generation, who "took for granted" the "blessings" of the British Empire.
