= List of Khatris =

List of notable members of the Khatri community

Following is a list of notable members of the Khatri community in India.

== Religious figures ==
=== Sikhism ===
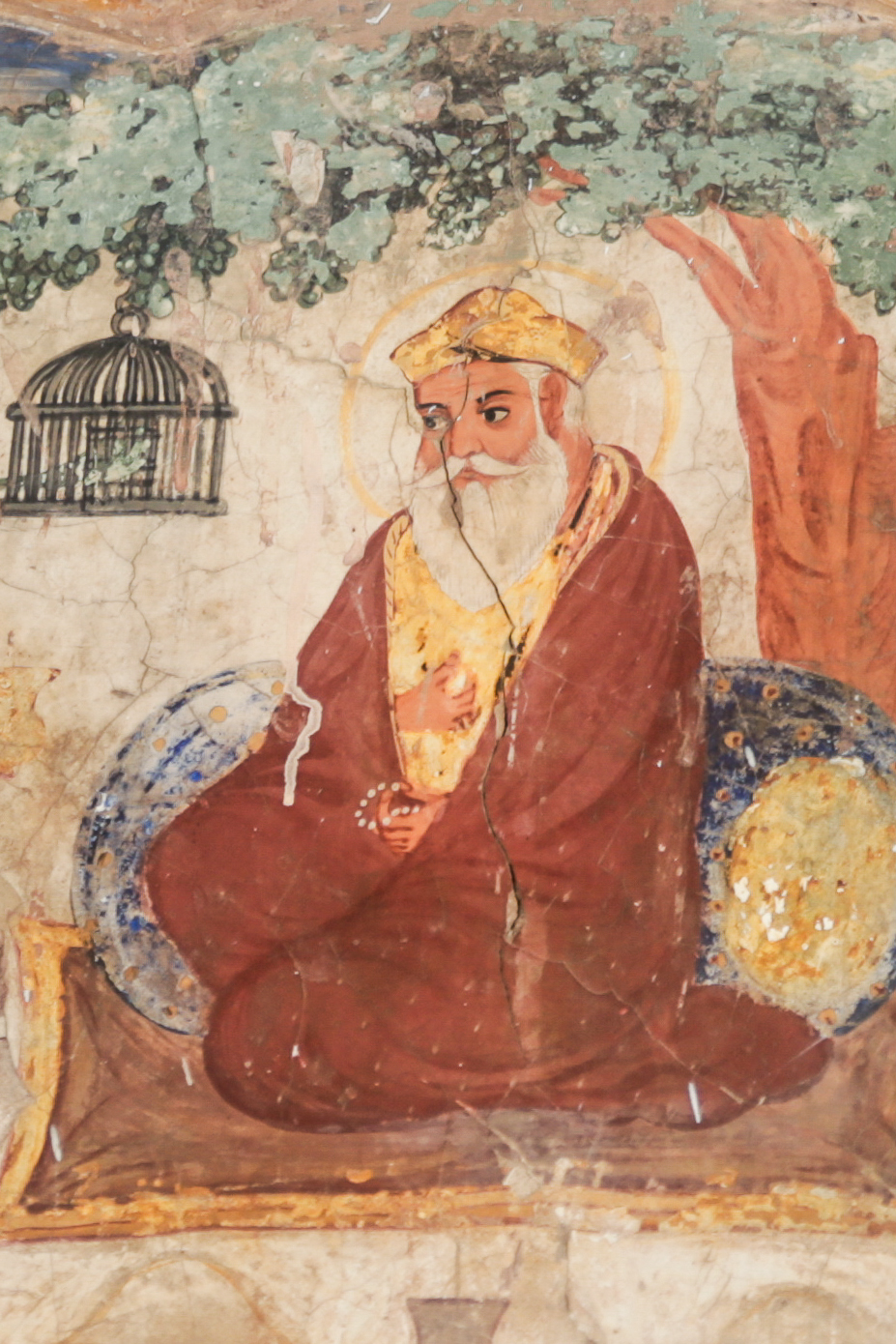
Guru Nanak

- Sikh Gurus
  - Guru Nanak Dev Bedi, founder of Sikhism
  - Guru Angad Dev, Trehan
  - Guru Amar Das, Bhalla
  - Guru Ram Das, Sodhi
  - Guru Arjan Dev, Sodhi
  - Guru Har Gobind, Sodhi
  - Guru Har Rai, Sodhi
  - Guru Har Krishan, Sodhi
  - Guru Tegh Bahadur, Sodhi
  - Guru Gobind Singh, Sodhi, founder of Khalsa
- Bhai Daya Singh Sobti, the first of the Panj Pyare (the initial members of the Khalsa), belonged to the Sobti clan of the Khatris
- Baba Sri Chand was the founder of the ascetic sect of Udasin and was the elder son of Guru Nanak, first Guru and founder of Sikhism.
- Baba Prithi Chand Sodhi (1558–1618), the eldest son of Guru Ram Das after the younger brother Guru Arjan was the founder of the Mina sect.
- Bhai Gurdas (1555–1636), a Bhalla Khatri who served as the first Jathedar of Akal Takht and the first scribe of the Adi Granth
- Ram Rai Sodhi, the eldest son of Guru Har Rai was the founder of Ram Raiyas sect of Sikhism.
- Shiv Dayal Singh, founder of the Radhasoami religious movement.
- Baba Dayal Singh Malhotra, founder of Nirankari
- Baba Binod Singh, Sikh warrior, and first jathedar of Buddha Dal, commander of Khalsa Fauj
- Vadbhag Singh Sodhi, one of the companion of Sikh Gurus originally from Sodhi-Bans (lineage)
- Haqiqat Rai, beheaded at the age of 14 for refusing to convert to Islam by Governor Zakariya Khan. Puri stood up against his classmates ridiculing Hindu deities.

== Historic political figures ==
=== Sikh Empire ===
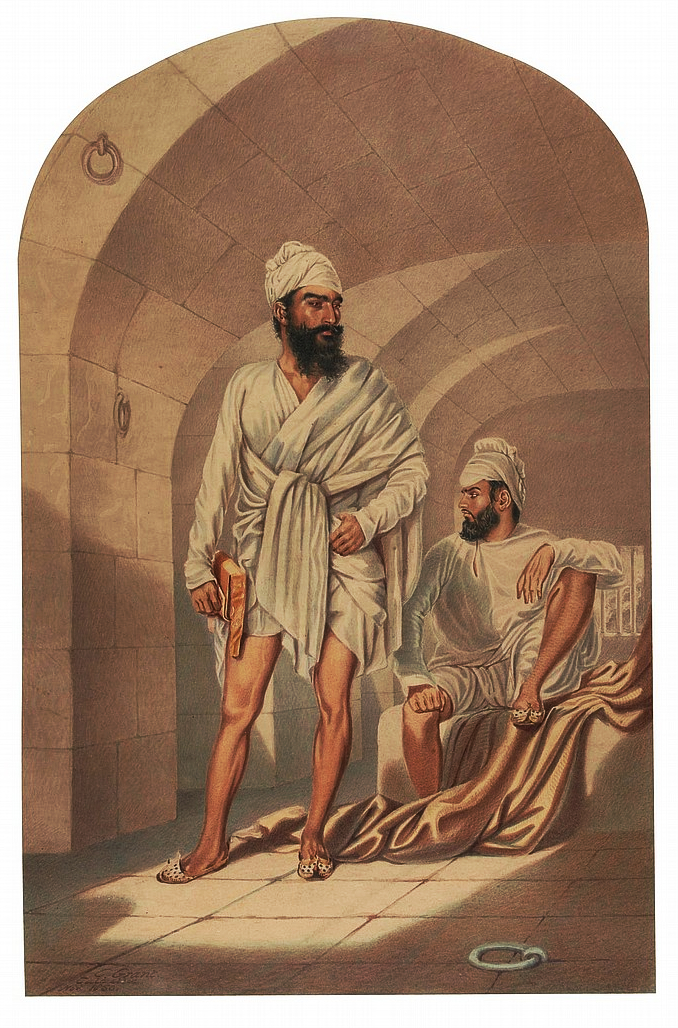
Diwan Mulraj Chopra

- Hari Singh Nalwa (Uppal Khatri) (1791–1837), the Commander-in-Chief of the Khalsa Army of the Sikh Empire under Ranjit Singh, Diwan of Kashmir, Hazara, and Peshawar
- Mohkam Chand Kochhar (1785–1814), general of the Khalsa Army under Ranjit Singh
- Moti Ram, son of Mohkam Chand, governor of Kashmir
- Kirpa Ram, son of Moti Ram, governor of Kashmir
- Sawan Mal Chopra, governor of Lahore and Multan, commander in the Khalsa Army
- Mulraj Chopra (1814–1851), governor of Multan, leader of a rebellion against the British which led to the Second Anglo-Sikh War
- Sardar Gulaba Khatri, founder of Dallewalia Misl which controlled Nakodar, Talwan, Badala, Rahon, Phillaur, Ludhiana at its peak.

=== Others ===
- Maharaja Bijay Chand Mahtab Kapoor GCIE, KCSI, IOM, with origins from Kotli, Sialkot was the ruler of Bardhaman Raj in Bengal from 1887 till his death in 1941. At its height, the kingdom extended to around 5,000 square miles (13,000 km) and included many parts of what is now Burdwan, Bankura, Medinipur, Howrah, Hooghly and Murshidabad districts
- Maharaja Uday Chand Mahtab of Bardhaman Raj, K.C.I.E., (14 July 1905 – 10 October 1984) was the last ruler of Burdwan Raj, who ruled from 1941 until 1955
- Maharaja Chandu Lal was the prime minister (1833–1844) for 3rd Nizam of Hyderabad Sikandar Jah.
- Maharaja Kishen Pershad, GCIE (1864–1940) came from a Peshkari Hyderabadi Noble family and served as the Prime Minister of Hyderabad State twice
- Raja Sukh Jiwan Mal, the ruler of Kashmir (1754–1762)
- Omichund, a merchant and broker during the Nawabi period of Bengal

== Indian military ==
- Vikram Batra, Param Vir Chakra awardee during the 1999 Kargil War.
- General Pran Nath Thapar, 4th Chief of the Indian Army.
- General J.J. Singh Marwah, 21st Chief of Indian Army
- Admiral Sardarilal Mathradas Nanda, 7th Chief of the Indian Navy.
- Air Marshal Om Prakash Mehra, Chief of the Indian Air Force.

== Indian independence activists ==
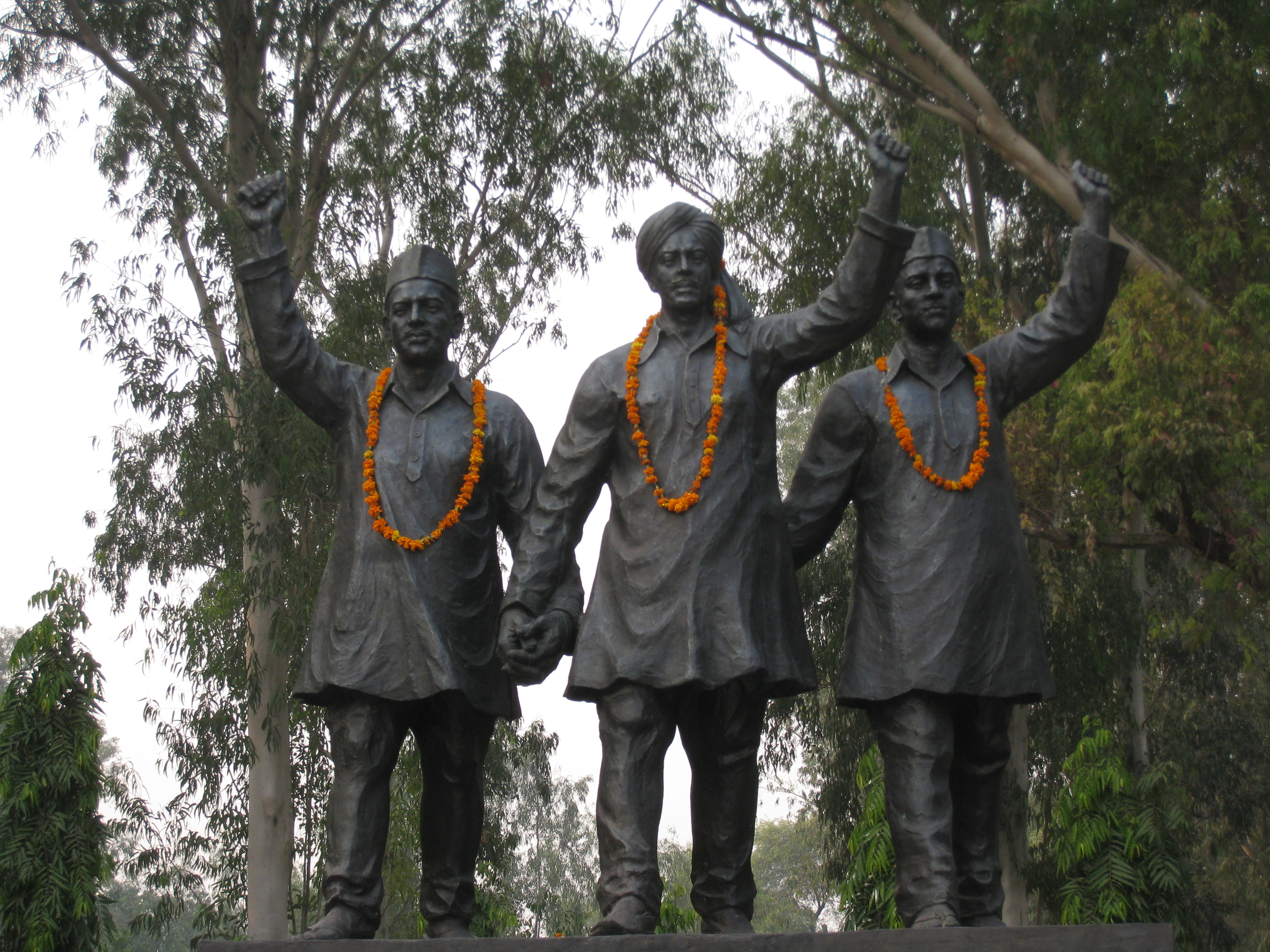
Statue of Sukhdev Thapar, along with Bhagat Singh and Rajguru

- Sukhdev, Indian freedom fighter, he participated in several actions alongside Bhagat Singh and Shivaram Rajguru, and was hanged by the British authorities on 23 March 1931 at the age of 23. He was a Thapar Khatri.
- Madan Lal Dhingra, Indian freedom fighter, While studying in England, he assassinated William Hutt Curzon Wyllie, a British official.
- Prem Krishan Khanna, Indian freedom fighter and a member of the Hindustan Republican Association. One of the revolutionaries prosecuted for the Kakori Conspiracy.
- Purushottam Das Tandon, Indian freedom fighter who opposed the partition of India, British rule over India. He was awarded the Bharat Ratna, India's highest civilian award in 1961.

== Science, technology and academics ==
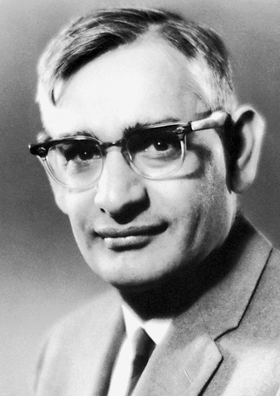
Hargobind Khorana, Nobel Prize Winner in Medicine in 1968

- Satish Dhawan, former chairman of the Indian Space Research Organisation (ISRO)
- Narinder Singh Kapany, Indian-American physicist and the inventor of fiber optics.
- Har Gobind Khorana, awarded the Nobel Prize in Physiology or Medicine in 1968 for his work on nucleic acid structures.
- Harish-Chandra Mehrotra, Indian-American mathematician and physicist, recipient of the Padma Bhushan and the Cole Prize in Mathematics for his papers on representations of semisimple Lie Algebras and Groups. He was considered for a Field's Medal in 1958.
- Daya Ram Sahni, first director-general of the Archaeological Survey of India (ASI)
- Ram Nath Chopra, Father of Indian Pharmacology
- Birbal Sahni, Indian Paleobotanist and elected a Fellow of the Royal Society of London (FRS)
- Mahesh Prasad Mehray, Indian ophthalmologist who was awarded the Padma Shri in 1955 and the Padma Bhushan in 1970.
- Mahatma Hansraj, co-founder of Dayanand Anglo-Vedic Schools (D.A.V) on whose memory Hansraj College was established.
- Faqir Chand Kohli, founder of Tata Consulltancy Services (TCS)

== Business and finance ==
- J.C and K.C Mahindra, founders of Mahindra & Mahindra. It is a part of the Mahindra Group, an Indian mu conglomerate
- Mohan Singh Oberoi, founder and chairman of The Oberoi Group
- Karam Chand Thapar, of the Thapar Group of companies.
- HP Nanda, founder of Escorts Limited
- Ponty Chadha, founder of Wave Group
- Om Prakash Munjal, founder of Hero MotoCorp and Hero Cycles
- Lala Jagat Narain, founder of Punjab Kesri
- Lala Harkishen Lal, co-founder of Punjab National Bank

== Bollywood ==
- Dev Anand, Indian actor
- Kanika Kapoor, Indian singer
- Prithviraj Kapoor, Indian actor
- Raj Kapoor, Indian actor
- Balraj Sahni, Indian actor
- B.R Chopra, Indian director
- Rajesh Khanna, Indian actor
- Ayushmann Khurrana, Indian actor
- Parineeti Chopra, Indian actress

== Literature and poetry ==
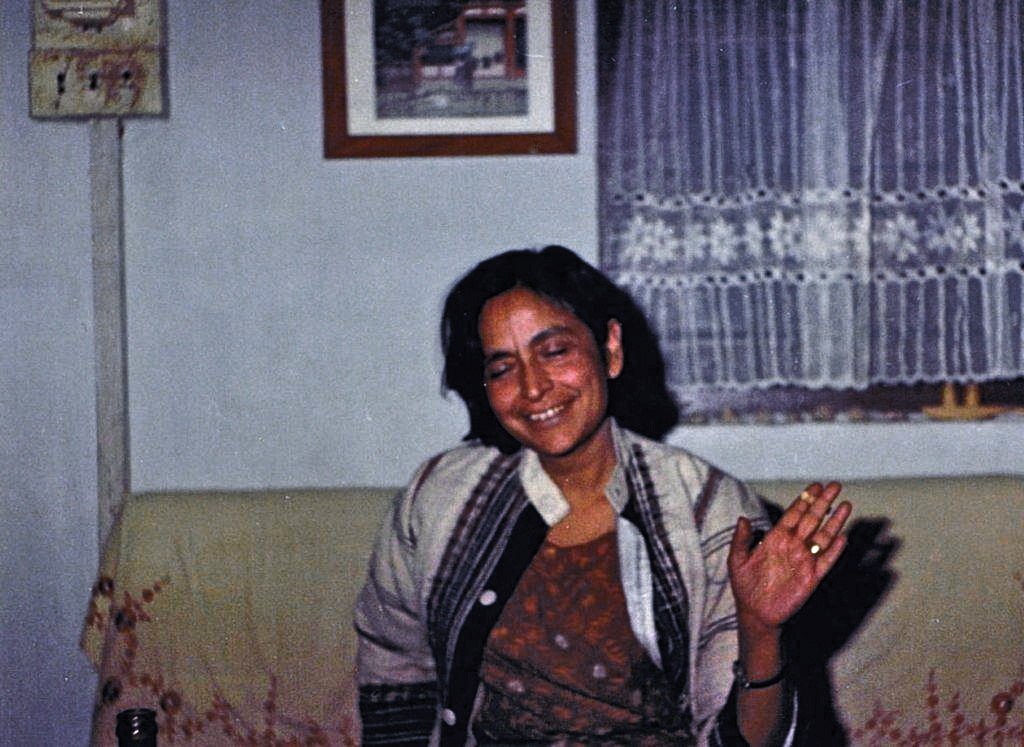
Amrita Pritam, Punjabi novelist

- Mirza Hasan Qatil, 18th-century Urdu and Persian poet
- Anand Ram Mukhlis, 18th-century Persian writer
- Mohammad Ibrahim Zauq, 18th-century Urdu poet
- Sujan Rai Bhandari, 17th-century historian
- Amrita Pritam (born in Gujranwala), Punjabi author
- Devaki Nandan Khatri, Hindi author and novelist

== Politics ==
- Inder Kumar Gujral (born in Jhelum), 12th Prime Minister of India
- Gulzarilal Nanda (born in Sialkot), Two-time Acting Prime Minister of India
- Giani Gurmukh Singh Musafir (born in Attock), Former Chief Minister of Punjab
- Balraj Madhok, RSS veteran and founder of ABVP & BJS
- Sheila Kapoor Dikshit (born in Kapurthala), Former Chief Minister of Delhi
- Madan Lal Khurana (born in Lyallpur), former chief minister of Delhi
- Tara Singh, Indian political and religious leader
- Manmohan Singh (born Gah), 13th prime minister of India from 2004 to 2014, former finance minister of India, economist
