= List of Padma Shri award recipients in trade and industry =

Recipients of a civilian award in India

This is a list of recipients of the Padma Shri award, the fourth-highest civilian award of the Republic of India, in the field of Trade and Industry. Service. As of 2025, a total of 125 individuals have been awarded Padma Shri for their contributions in this category.

== 1950–1959 ==
Year	Name	State	Field
1955	Tata Shri Jehangir Ratanji Dadabhai	Maharashtra	Trade and Industry
1957	Ghanshyamdas Birla	Rajasthan	Trade and Industry
1958	Jehangir Ghandy	Maharashtra	Trade and Industry
1958	Aragula Nagaraja Rao	Andhra Pradesh	Trade and Industry
1959	Atma Ram	West Bengal	Trade and Industry

== 1960–1969 ==
Year	Name	State	Field
1960	Adinath Lahiri	West Bengal	Trade and Industry
1961	Krishnaswamy Venkataraman	Maharashtra	Trade and Industry
1964	Dara Nussarwanji Khurody	Lebanon	Trade and Industry
1965	Shantanu Lakshman Kirloskar	Maharashtra	Trade and Industry
1965	Hanumanbax Kanoi	Rajasthan	Trade and Industry
1965	Krutartha Acharya	Odisha	Trade and Industry
1965	Verghese Kurien	Gujarat	Trade and Industry
1966	Babubhai Maneklal Chinai	Maharashtra	Trade and Industry
1966	Verghese Kurien	Gujarat	Trade and Industry
1966	Ramprasad Ramchand Khandelwal	Uttar Pradesh	Trade and Industry
1967	Vasantrao Patil	Maharashtra	Trade and Industry
1967	Nagappa Chettiar	Tamil Nadu	Trade and Industry
1967	Ved Rattan Mohan	Uttar Pradesh	Trade and Industry
1967	Vithaldas Hakamchand Shah	Maharashtra	Trade and Industry
1968	Gujarmal Modi	Uttar Pradesh	Trade and Industry
1969	Kasturbhai Lalbhai	Gujarat	Trade and Industry
1969	Kasturiswami Sreenivasan	Tamil Nadu	Trade and Industry
1969	Keshav Prasad Goenka	West Bengal	Trade and Industry
1969	K. Shaikabdulkhader Ghulamohideen	Tamil Nadu	Trade and Industry
1969	Ram Lal Rajgarhia	Delhi	Trade and Industry
1969	Upendra Maharathi	Bihar	Trade and Industry

== 1970–1979 ==
Year	Name	State	Field
1970	Dattatraya Mahadeo Dahanukar	Maharashtra	Trade and Industry
1970	Govind Ram Hada	Delhi	Trade and Industry
1970	Phul Chand	West Bengal	Trade and Industry
1971	Bhalchandra Digambar Garware	Maharashtra	Trade and Industry
1971	Devchand Chhaganlal Shah	Maharashtra	Trade and Industry
1971	Jogesh Chandra De	West Bengal	Trade and Industry
1971	Kedar Nath Mookerjee	West Bengal	Trade and Industry
1971	Mangtu Ram Jaipuria	Uttar Pradesh	Trade and Industry
1971	Manibhai J. Patel	Madhya Pradesh	Trade and Industry
1971	Ramrao Madhaorao Deshmukh	Maharashtra	Trade and Industry
1971	Suresh Chandra Roy	West Bengal	Trade and Industry
1971	Ved Rattan Mohan	Uttar Pradesh	Trade and Industry
1971	Coorg Narasimhaiengar Krishna Murthy	Uttar Pradesh	Trade and Industry
1971	Yelavarthy Nayudamma	Tamil Nadu	Trade and Industry
1971	Debi Sahai Jindal	Haryana	Trade and Industry
1971	Devan Venkata Reddi	West Bengal	Trade and Industry
1971	Hari Dev Shourie	Delhi	Trade and Industry
1971	Harnam Dass Wahi	West Bengal	Trade and Industry
1971	Khailshankar Durlabhji	Rajasthan	Trade and Industry
1971	Maqbool Ahmed Lari	Uttar Pradesh	Trade and Industry
1971	Prem Nath Sahni	Punjab	Trade and Industry
1971	Udaybhansinhji Natwarsinhji Jethwa	Gujarat	Trade and Industry
1972	Bharat Ram	Delhi	Trade and Industry
1972	Syed Husain Zaheer	Andhra Pradesh	Trade and Industry
1972	Mohan Mull Chordia	Tamil Nadu	Trade and Industry
1973	Raja Muthiah Annamalai Muthiah Chettiar	Tamil Nadu	Trade and Industry
1974	Patwardhan Waman Dattatraya	Maharashtra	Trade and Industry
1975	Narielwala Phirozeshah Ardeshir	Maharashtra	Trade and Industry
1976	Naoroji Pirojsha Godrej	Maharashtra	Trade and Industry

== 1980–1989 ==
Year	Name	State	Field
1983	Gulam Rusull Khan	Jammu and Kashmir	Trade and Industry
1985	Jadunath Supakar	Uttar Pradesh	Trade and Industry
1985	Nelly Homi Sethna	Maharashtra	Trade and Industry
1988	Col. Satya Pal Wahi	Uttarakhand	Trade and Industry
1988	Shivanarayan Motilal Rathi @ Babubhai Rathi	Maharashtra	Trade and Industry
1989	Rustomji Hoermusji Mody	Jharkhand	Trade and Industry
1989	Suresh Shankar Nadkarni	Maharashtra	Trade and Industry
1989	Kum. Kiran Mazumdar-Shaw	Karnataka	Trade and Industry
1989	Lila Firoz Poonawalla	Maharashtra	Trade and Industry

== 1990–1999 ==
Year	Name	State	Field
1990	Sumant Moolgaokar (Posthumous)	Maharashtra	Trade and Industry
1990	Banda Vasudev Rao	Maharashtra	Trade and Industry
1990	Mohammad Swaleh Ansari	Uttar Pradesh	Trade and Industry
1991	Hosagrahar Chandrashekhariah Visvesvaraya	Delhi	Trade and Industry
1991	Neelkanth Annappa Kalyani	Maharashtra	Trade and Industry
1991	Padamanur Ananda Rau	Tamil Nadu	Trade and Industry
1991	Ramesh Gelli	Karnataka	Trade and Industry
1991	Vasantrao Srinivassa Dempo	Goa	Trade and Industry
1992	Jehangir Ratanji Dadabhai Tata	Maharashtra	Trade and Industry
1992	Hasmukh Thakordas Parekh	Maharashtra	Trade and Industry
1992	Kandathil Mammen Mammen Mappillai	Tamil Nadu	Trade and Industry
1992	Lal Chand Hirachand	Maharashtra	Trade and Industry
1992	Meenakshi Saraogi	West Bengal	Trade and Industry
1992	Rukmini Baburao Pawar	Maharashtra	Trade and Industry
1998	Naushad Ismail Padamsee	Maharashtra	Trade and Industry
1999	Sohrab Pirojsha Godrej	Maharashtra	Trade and Industry
1999	Harshavardhan Neotia	West Bengal	Trade and Industry

== 2000–2009 ==
Year	Name	State	Field
2000	Maidavolu Narasimham	Telangana	Trade and Industry
2000	Ratan Tata	Maharashtra	Trade and Industry
2000	Nagavara Ramarao Narayana Murthy	Karnataka	Trade and Industry
2001	Bhupathiraju Vissam Raju	Telangana	Trade and Industry
2001	Dr.(Kum.) Amrita Patel	Gujarat	Trade and Industry
2001	Badrinarayan Ramulal Barwale	Maharashtra	Trade and Industry
2001	Mohan Singh Oberoi	Delhi	Trade and Industry
2001	Rahul Bajaj	Maharashtra	Trade and Industry
2001	Kallam Anji Reddy	Telangana	Trade and Industry
2001	Kandathil Mammen Philip	Maharashtra	Trade and Industry
2002	Henning Holck Larsen	Maharashtra	Trade and Industry
2002	Pravinchandra Varjivan Gandhi	Maharashtra	Trade and Industry
2003	Hari Shankar Singhania	Delhi	Trade and Industry
2003	Jamshyd Naoroji Godrej	Maharashtra	Trade and Industry
2003	Nalli Kuppuswami Chetti	Tamil Nadu	Trade and Industry
2004	Sharayu Daftary	Maharashtra	Trade and Industry
2005	Brijmohan Lall Munjal	Delhi	Trade and Industry
2005	Azim Premji	Karnataka	Trade and Industry
2006	Gunter Kruger (Posthumous)	Maharashtra	Trade and Industry
2006	Deepak S. Parekh	Maharashtra	Trade and Industry
2006	Subramanian Ramadorai	Maharashtra	Trade and Industry
2006	Tarun Das	Haryana	Trade and Industry
2006	Suresh Krishna	Tamil Nadu	Trade and Industry
2006	Shahnaz Husain	Delhi	Trade and Industry
2007	Jamshed J. Irani	Maharashtra	Trade and Industry
2007	N. Mahalingam	Tamil Nadu	Trade and Industry
2007	Osamu Suzuki	Japan	Trade and Industry
2007	Indra K. Nooyi	United States of America	Trade and Industry
2007	Sunil Bharti Mittal	Delhi	Trade and Industry
2007	Naina Lal Kidwai	Maharashtra	Trade and Industry
2007	Anantharamakrishnan Sivasailam	Tamil Nadu	Trade and Industry
2007	Rajinder Gupta	Punjab	Trade and Industry
2008	Lakshmi Niwas Mittal	United Kingdom	Trade and Industry
2008	N. R. Narayana Murthy	Karnataka	Trade and Industry
2008	P. R. S. Oberoi	Delhi	Trade and Industry
2008	Ratan Tata	Maharashtra	Trade and Industry
2008	Vikram Shankar Pandit	United States of America	Trade and Industry
2008	Baba Kalyani	Maharashtra	Trade and Industry
2008	K. V. Kamath	Maharashtra	Trade and Industry
2008	Shiv Nadar	Tamil Nadu	Trade and Industry
2008	Suresh Kumar Neotia	Delhi	Trade and Industry
2008	Amit Mitra	Delhi	Trade and Industry
2009	Ashok Sekhar Ganguly	Maharashtra	Trade and Industry
2009	Anilkumar Manibhai Naik	Maharashtra	Trade and Industry
2009	B. R. Shetty	UAE	Trade and Industry
2009	A. Sakthivel	Tamil Nadu	Trade and Industry
2009	R.K. Krishna Kumar	Maharashtra	Trade and Industry

== 2010–2019 ==
Year	Name	State	Field
2010	Prathap Chandra Reddy	Tamil Nadu	Trade and Industry
2010	Capt. C. P. Krishnan Nair	Maharashtra	Trade and Industry
2010	Kushal Pal Singh	Delhi	Trade and Industry
2010	Manvinder (Vindi) Singh Banga	United Kingdom	Trade and Industry
2010	Narayanan Vaghul	Tamil Nadu	Trade and Industry
2010	Shripaul Oswal	Punjab	Trade and Industry
2010	Brig. (Dr.) Kapil Mohan	Himachal Pradesh	Trade and Industry
2010	Alluri Venkata Satyanarayana Raju	Telangana	Trade and Industry
2010	Karsanbhai Khodidas Patel	Gujarat	Trade and Industry
2010	Ravi Pillai	Bahrain	Trade and Industry
2010	Deepak Puri	Delhi	Trade and Industry
2010	Irshad Mirza	Uttar Pradesh	Trade and Industry
2010	T.N. Manoharan	Tamil Nadu	Trade and Industry
2010	Venu Srinivasan	Tamil Nadu	Trade and Industry
2011	Azim Premji	Karnataka	Trade and Industry
2011	G. V. K. Reddy	Telangana	Trade and Industry
2011	Kallam Anji Reddy	Telangana	Trade and Industry
2011	Ajai Chowdhry	Delhi	Trade and Industry
2011	Analjit Singh	Delhi	Trade and Industry
2011	Rajendra Singh Pawar	Haryana	Trade and Industry
2011	S. Gopalakrishnan	Karnataka	Trade and Industry
2011	Yogesh Chander Deveshwar	West Bengal	Trade and Industry
2011	Chanda Kochhar	Maharashtra	Trade and Industry
2011	K. Raghavendra Rao	Tamil Nadu	Trade and Industry
2011	Mecca Rafeeque Ahmed	Tamil Nadu	Trade and Industry
2011	Sat Pal Khattar	Singapore	Trade and Industry
2012	B. Muthuraman	Maharashtra	Trade and Industry
2012	Murugappa Vellayan Subbiah	Tamil Nadu	Trade and Industry
2012	Swati A. Piramal	Maharashtra	Trade and Industry
2012	Priya Paul	Delhi	Trade and Industry
2012	Shoji Shiba	Japan	Trade and Industry
2012	Arun Hastimal Firodia	Maharashtra	Trade and Industry
2012	Gopinath Pillai	Singapore	Trade and Industry
2013	Adi Godrej	Maharashtra	Trade and Industry
2013	Ramamurthy Thyagarajan	Tamil Nadu	Trade and Industry
2013	Hemendra Prasad Barooah	West Bengal	Trade and Industry
2013	Milind Pralhad Kamble	Maharashtra	Trade and Industry
2013	Kalpana Saroj	Maharashtra	Trade and Industry
2013	Rajshree Pathy	Tamil Nadu	Trade and Industry
2013	Vandana Luthra	Delhi	Trade and Industry
2014	Mallika Srinivasan	Tamil Nadu	Trade and Industry
2014	Pratap Govind Pawar	Maharashtra	Trade and Industry
2014	Rajesh Kumar Saraiya	Maharashtra	Trade and Industry
2014	Ravi Kumar Narra	Telangana	Trade and Industry
2015	T. V. Mohandas Pai	Karnataka	Trade and Industry
2016	Dhirubhai Ambani (Posthumous)	Maharashtra	Trade and Industry
2016	Pallonji Shapoorji Mistry	Ireland	Trade and Industry
2016	Indu Jain	Delhi	Trade and Industry
2016	Keki Hormusji Gharda	Maharashtra	Trade and Industry
2016	Mahesh Sharma	Delhi	Trade and Industry
2016	Ajaypal Singh Banga	United States of America	Trade and Industry
2016	Dilip S Shanghvi	Maharashtra	Trade and Industry
2016	Saurabh Srivastava	Delhi	Trade and Industry
2017	Mohan Reddy Venkat Rama Bodanapu	Telangana	Trade and Industry
2018	Rameshwarlal Kabra	Maharashtra	Trade and Industry
2018	Jose Ma. A. Concepcion III	Philippines	Trade and Industry
2019	Anilkumar Manibhai Naik	Maharashtra	Trade and Industry
2019	John Chambers	United States of America	Trade and Industry
2019	Mahashay Dharam Pal Gulati	Delhi	Trade and Industry
2019	Shantanu Narayen	United States of America	Trade and Industry

== 2020–2025 ==
Year	Name	State	Field
2020	Anand Mahindra	Maharashtra	Trade and Industry
2020	Venu Srinivasan	Tamil Nadu	Trade and Industry
2020	Jai Prakash Agarwal	Delhi	Trade and Industry
2020	Sanjeev Bikhchandani	Uttar Pradesh	Trade and Industry
2020	Gafurbhai M. Bilakhia	Gujarat	Trade and Industry
2020	Chewang Motup Goba	Ladakh	Trade and Industry
2020	Bharat Goenka	Karnataka	Trade and Industry
2020	Nemnath Jain	Madhya Pradesh	Trade and Industry
2020	Vijay Sankeshwar	Karnataka	Trade and Industry
2020	Romesh Wadhwani	United States of America	Trade and Industry
2020	V. Prem Watsa	Canada	Trade and Industry
2021	Rajnikant Devidas Shroff	Maharashtra	Trade and Industry
2021	Rajni Bector	Punjab	Trade and Industry
2021	Jaswantiben Jamnadas Popat	Maharashtra	Trade and Industry
2021	P Subramanian (Posthumous)	Tamil Nadu	Trade and Industry
2021	Sridhar Vembu	Tamil Nadu	Trade and Industry
2022	N. Chandrasekaran	Maharashtra	Trade and Industry
2022	Krishna Murthy Ella and Smt. Suchitra Krishna Ella (Duo)	Telangana	Trade and Industry
2022	Satya Nadella	United States of America	Trade and Industry
2022	Sundar Pichai	United States of America	Trade and Industry
2022	Cyrus S. Poonawalla	Maharashtra	Trade and Industry
2022	Prahalad Rai Agarwala	West Bengal	Trade and Industry
2022	Sardar Jagjit Singh Dardi	Punjab	Trade and Industry
2022	Moirangthem Muktamani Devi	Manipur	Trade and Industry
2022	Ryuko Hira	Japan	Trade and Industry
2023	Kumar Mangalam Birla	Maharashtra	Trade and Industry
2023	Rakesh Radheshyam Jhunjhunwala (Posthumous)	Maharashtra	Trade and Industry
2023	Areez Khambatta (Posthumous)	Gujarat	Trade and Industry
2024	Young-Way Liu	Taiwan	Trade and Industry
2024	Kalpana Morparia	Maharashtra	Trade and Industry
2024	Shashi Soni	Karnataka	Trade and Industry
2025	Osamu Suzuki (Posthumous)	Japan	Trade and Industry
2025	Nalli Kuppuswami Chetti	Tamil Nadu	Trade and Industry
2025	Pankaj Patel	Gujarat	Trade and Industry
2025	Arundhati Bhattacharya	Maharashtra	Trade and Industry
2025	Onkar Singh Pahwa	Punjab	Trade and Industry
2025	Pawan Goenka	West Bengal	Trade and Industry
2025	Prashanth Prakash	Karnataka	Trade and Industry
2025	R G Chandramogan	Tamil Nadu	Trade and Industry
2025	Sajjan Bhajanka	West Bengal	Trade and Industry
2025	Sally Holkar	Madhya Pradesh	Trade and Industry
