= Seli Hydroelectric Plant =

The Seli Hydroelectric Plant aims to provide 400 megawatts (540,000 hp) of hydro electric power in Lahaul & Spitidistrict, Himachal Pradesh, India. The project has been awarded to Moser Baer through the international competitive bidding process. The project component comprises a concrete gravity dam of about 80 metres (260 ft) height above river bed level with two head race tunnels of approximately 4.2 km and an underground powerhouse complex on the right bank of river Chenab. Power would be generated by harnessing 114.92 metres (377.0 ft) average gross head between intake and tail race location.

== Project objectives ==
The Project shall provide:

- Peaking power
- Renewable energy which helps reduce carbon emissions
- Development of remote areas in higher reaches
- Sustainable business and lowering cost of generation of electricity

== CSR and R&R ==
CSR activities are being taken regularly under the name EECHHO (Education, Environment, Community Development, Health & Hygiene and Other Activities).

In phased manner tree plantation activity taken up in association with Forest Department. Deodar and other broad leaved species have been planted in the first phase of the drive. SHEPCL is promoting & sponsoring local sports & cultural activities, medical camps etc. for the benefit of local population.
