= Mohan Shakti National Heritage Park =

Indian Hindu temple complex

Shakti National Heritage Park
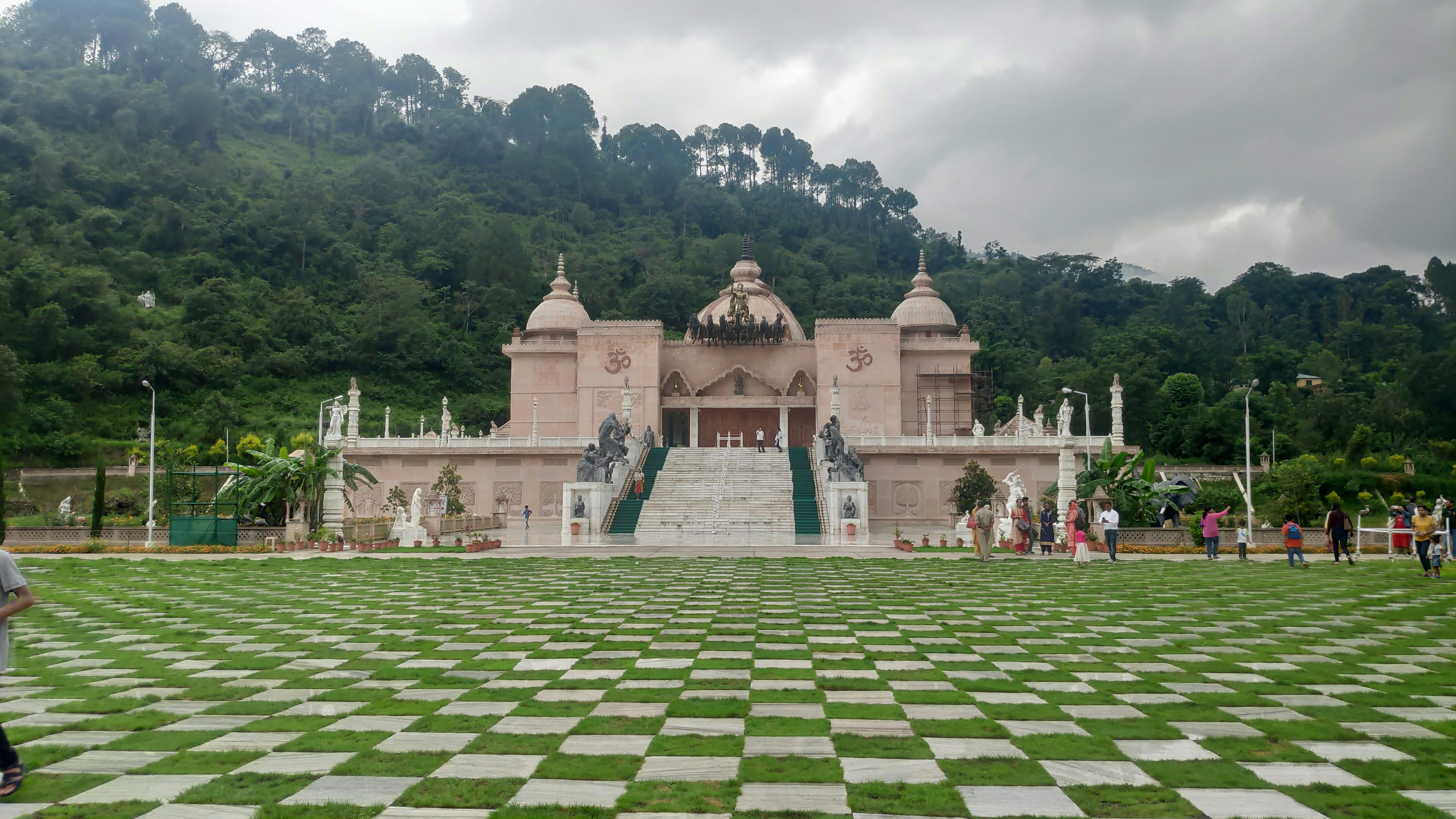

- Location within Himachal Pradesh Location within India

Religion
- Affiliation: Hinduism
- District: Solan district

Location
- Location: Solan
- State: Himachal Pradesh
- Country: India
- Interactive map of Shakti National Heritage Park
- Coordinates: 30°56′08″N 77°08′58″E

Architecture
- Creator: Brigadier Kapil Mohan, Retired
- Completed: 20th century

Mohan Shakti National Heritage Park, also referred to as the Solan Heritage Park, is a modern-era Indian heritage complex in Harat, near Solan, Himachal Pradesh, India. It is about 40 kilometers south of Shimla, about 15 kilometers north of Solan, and 85 kilometers northeast of Chandigarh. Spread over 40 acres of land, it was founded by Kapil Mohan – a retired Brigadier of the Indian Army, a Padma Shree awardee of India and an heir to the liquor-manufacturing family business Mohan Meakin Limited of Solan and Ghaziabad. The site is about 10 kilometers from the Solan "Old Monk" brewery operations of Mohan Meakin. The heritage complex costs around Rs 100 crore to build.

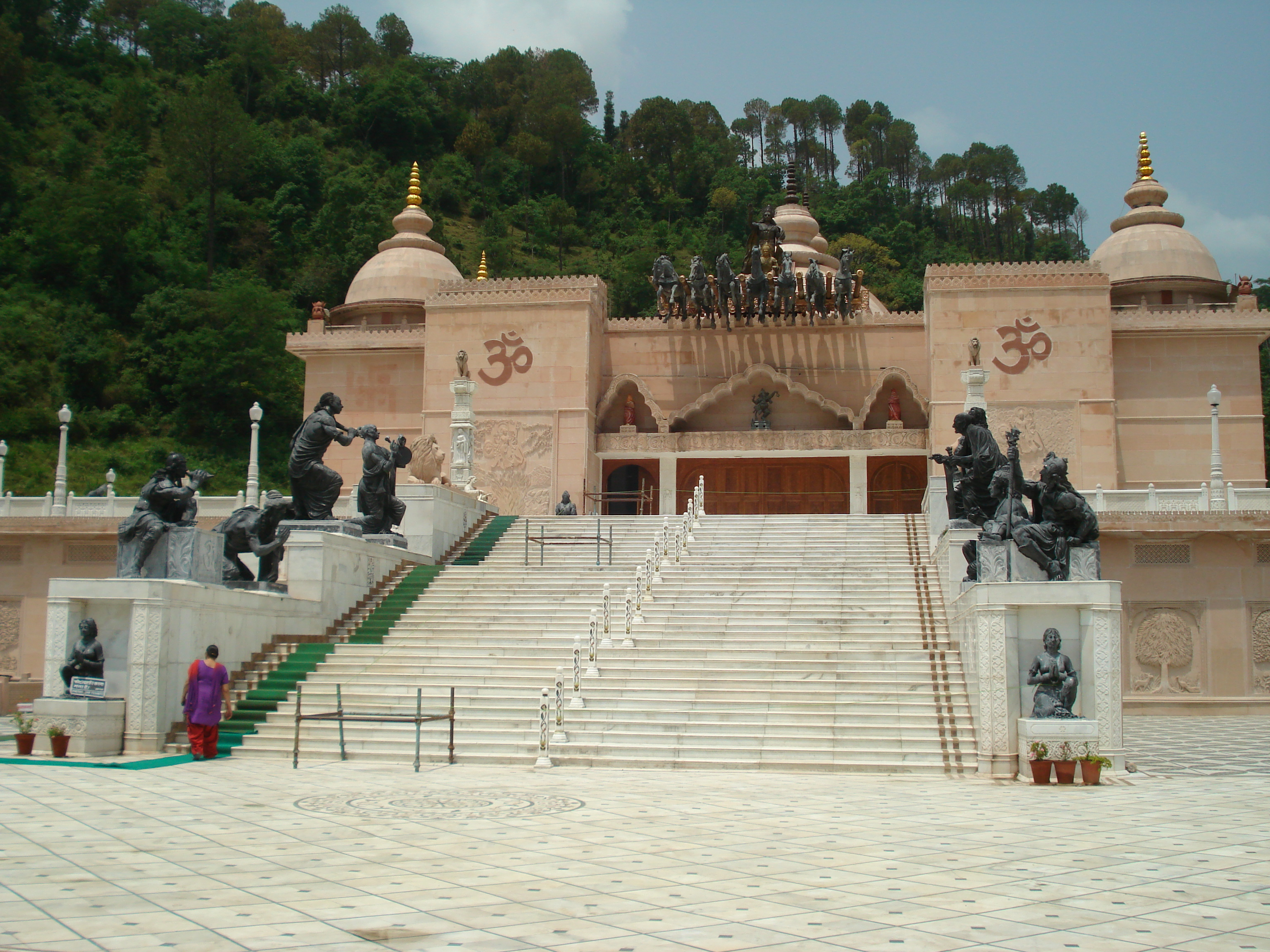
The temple-like building in the park

It is set on a hillside with a view of Ashwini Khad valley and the foothills of the Himalayas. The complex includes an expansive garden and park with a large Hindu temple at the top. The temple has two large "Om" symbols in the front, and Surya in a seven-horse chariot on the top. The temple features artwork of Hindu legends from the Vedas, the Ramayana and the Mahabharata. Motifs of Indian culture such as elephant, lion, tiger, peacock and river dolphin statues also dot the heritage park. The site includes life-size statues of famed Vedic rishis along with Hindu mythical figures and deities.

The park was inaugurated by Atal Bihari Vajpayee on Dec 01, 2002.

== Gallery ==
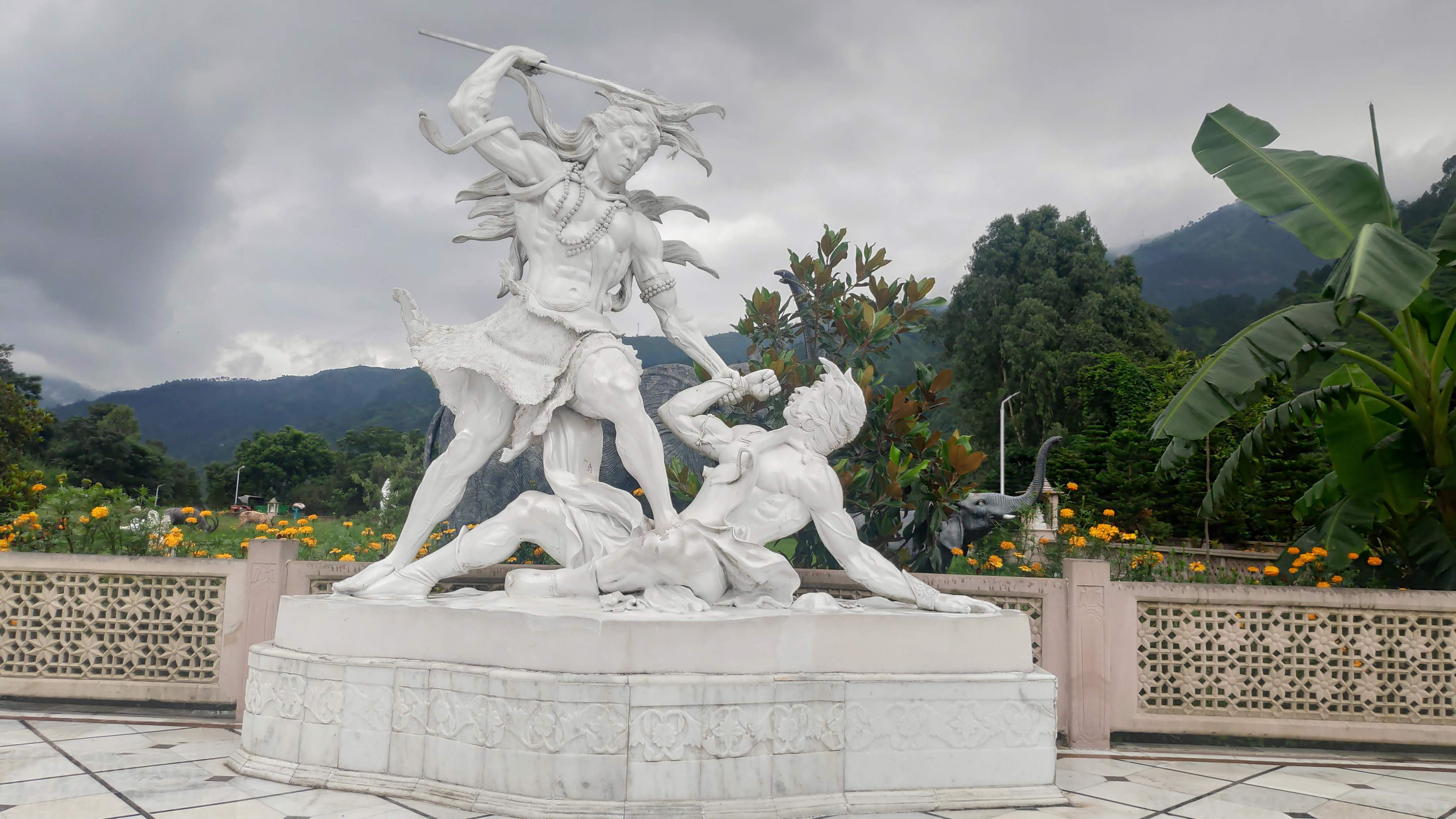
Shiva

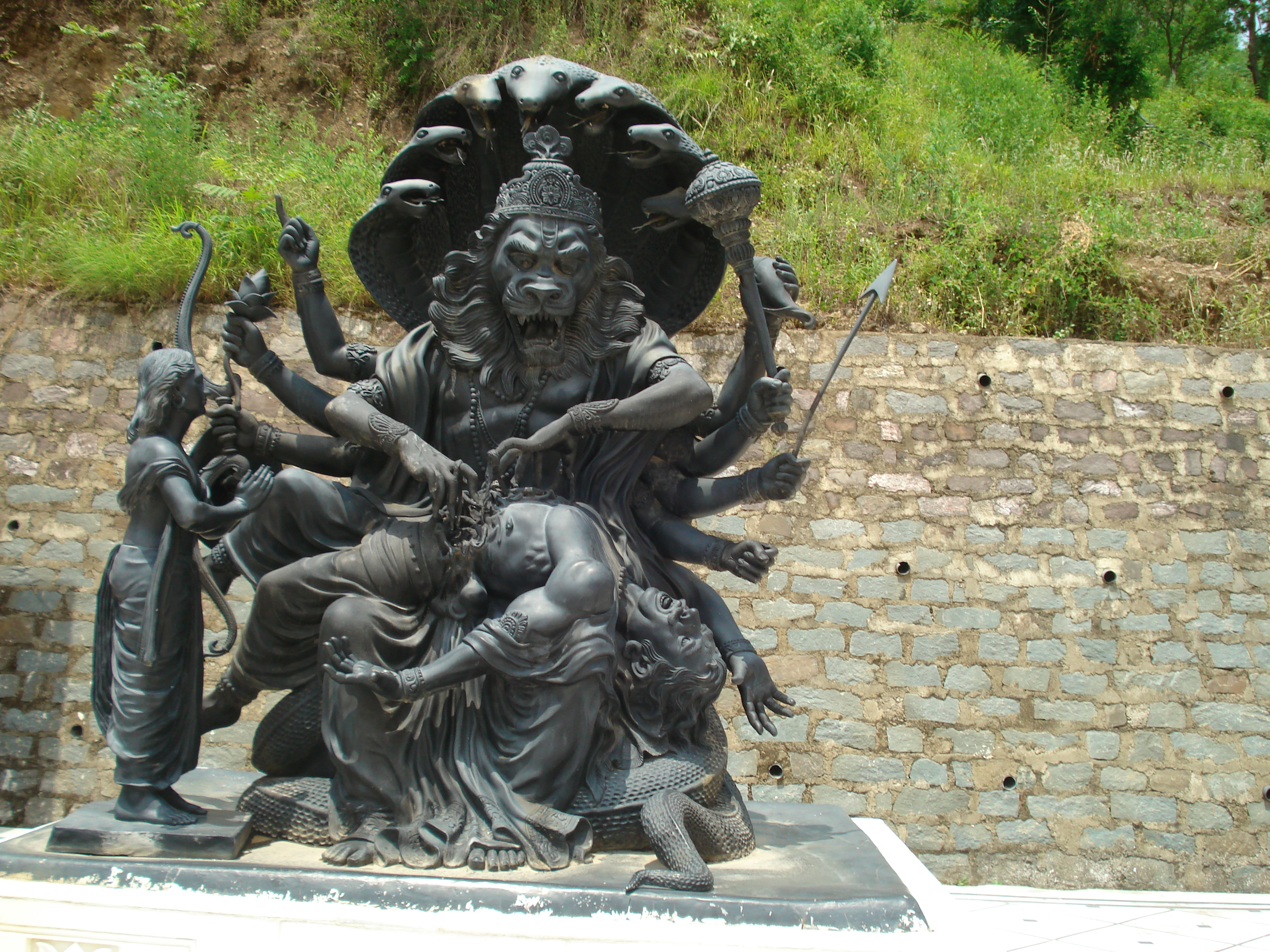
Narasimha legend

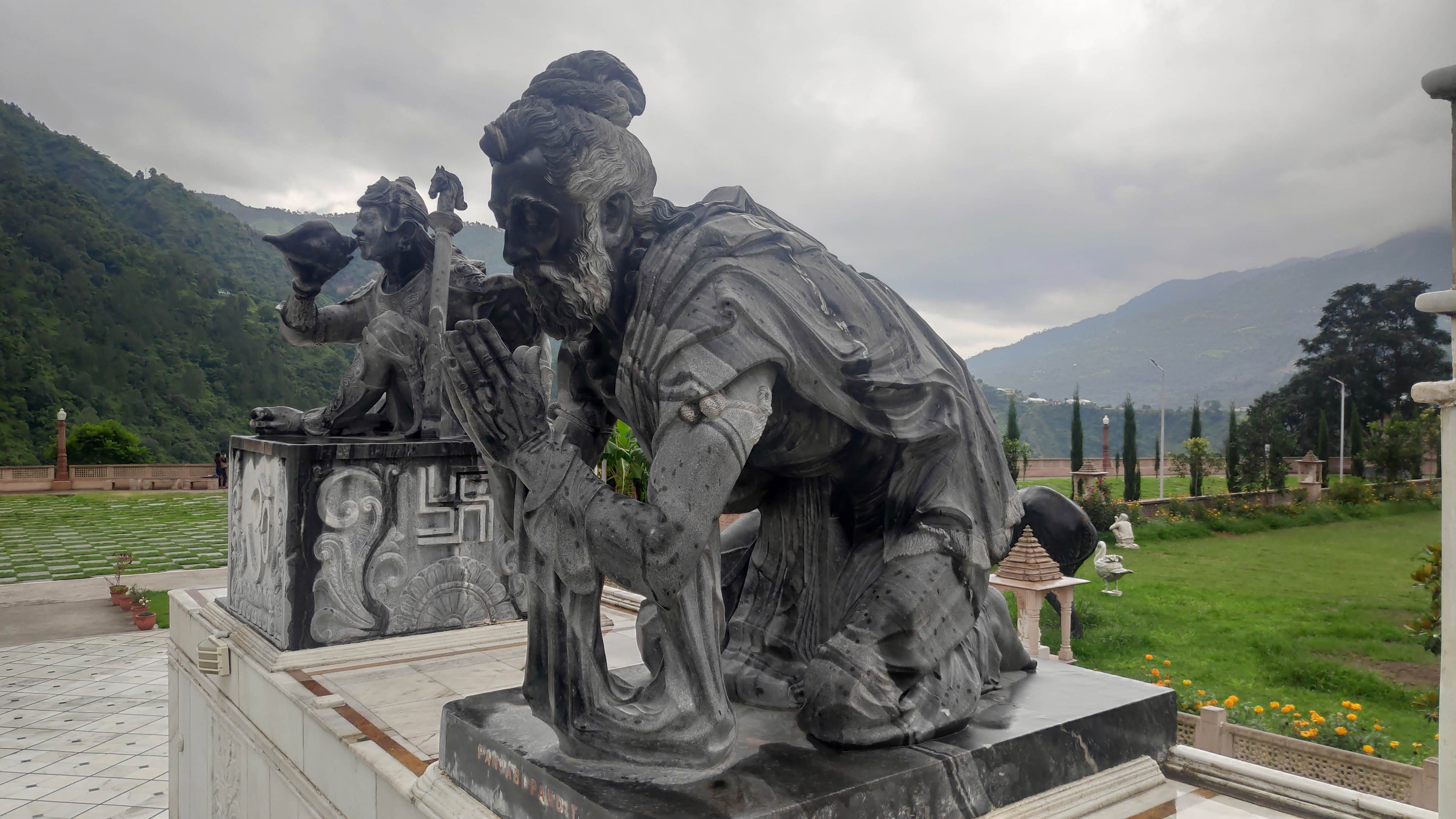
A rishi (sage-poet)

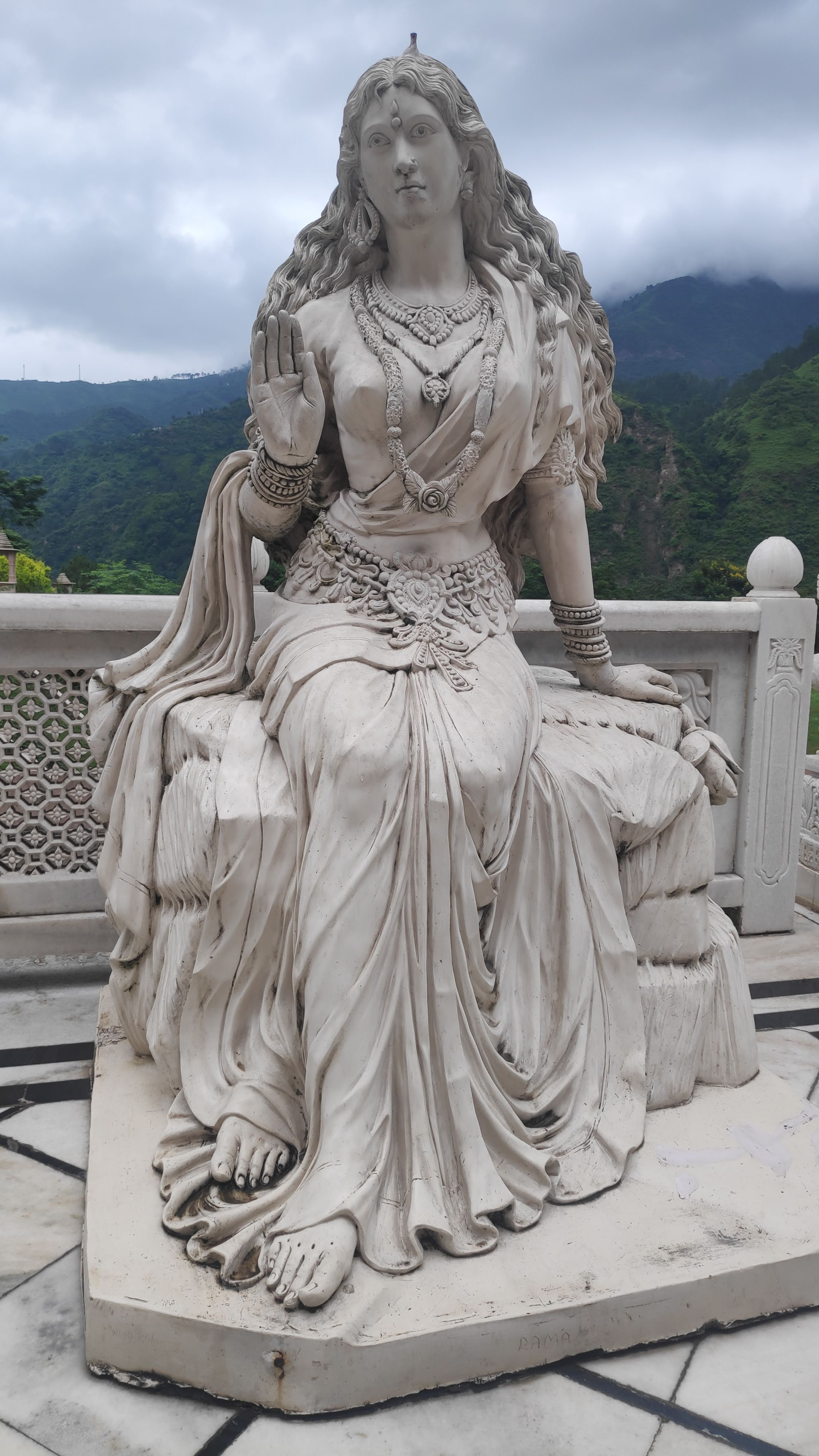
A Devi

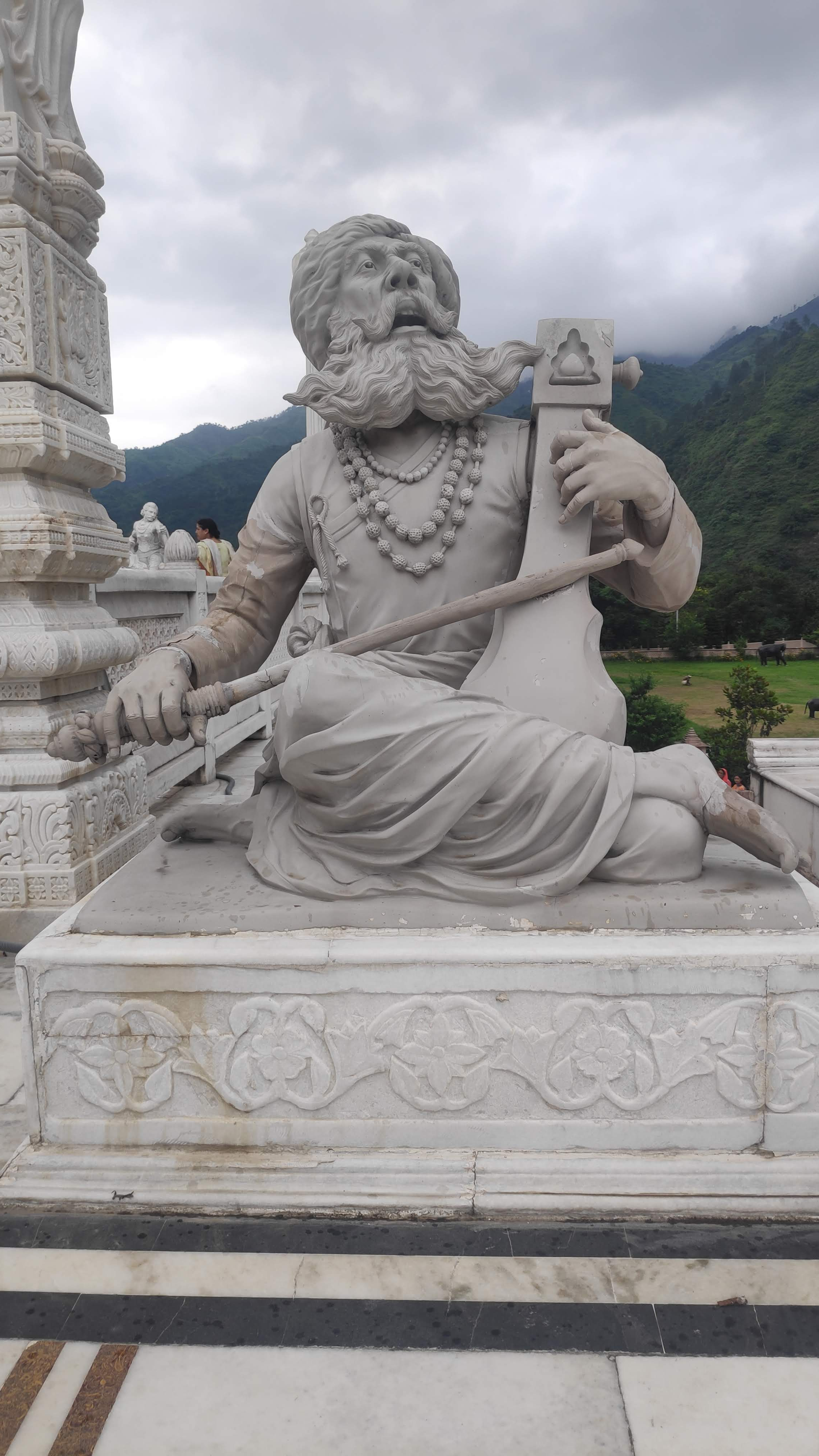
A singer–musician

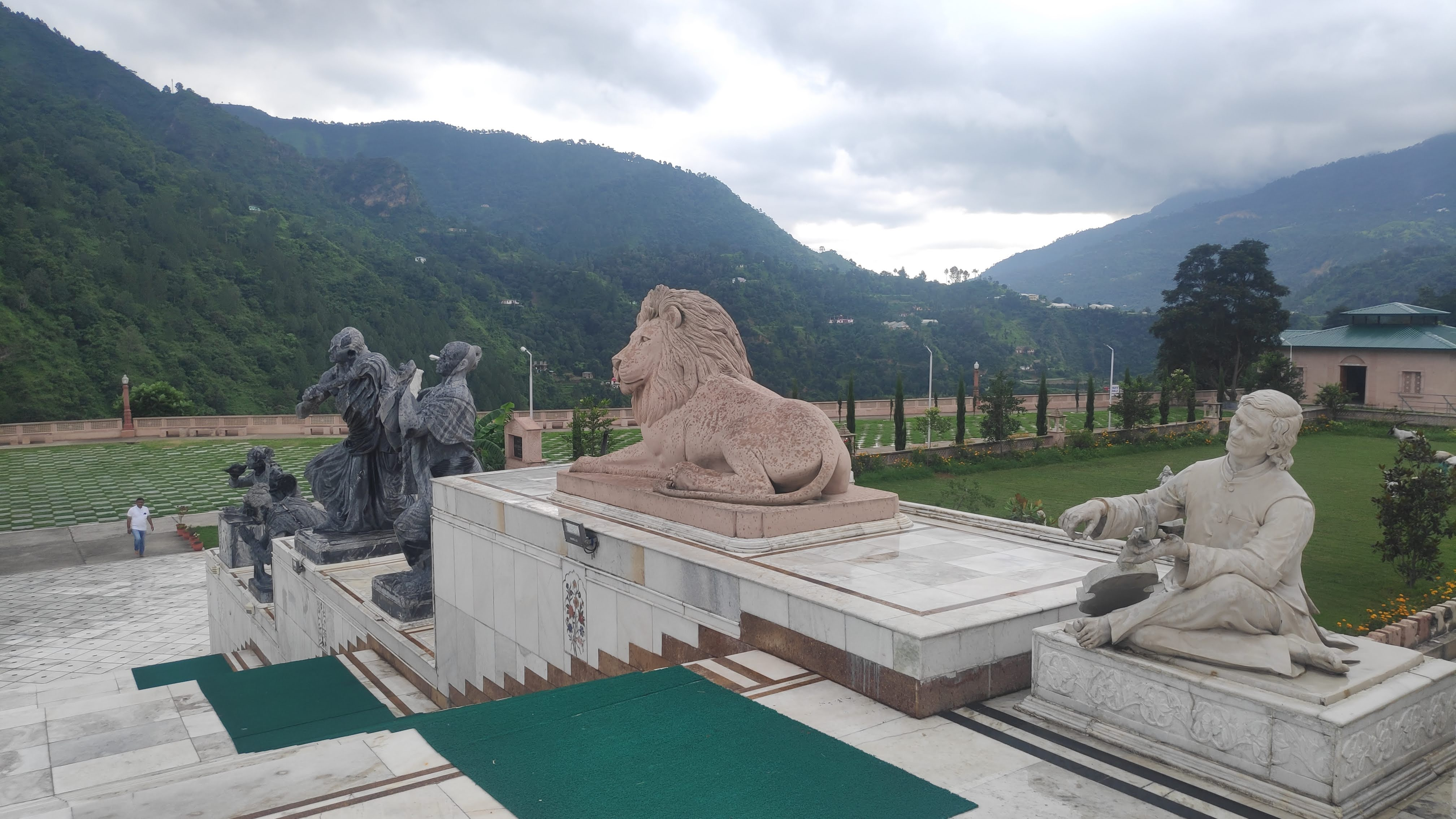
Mountain view from Mohan Shakti Heritage park

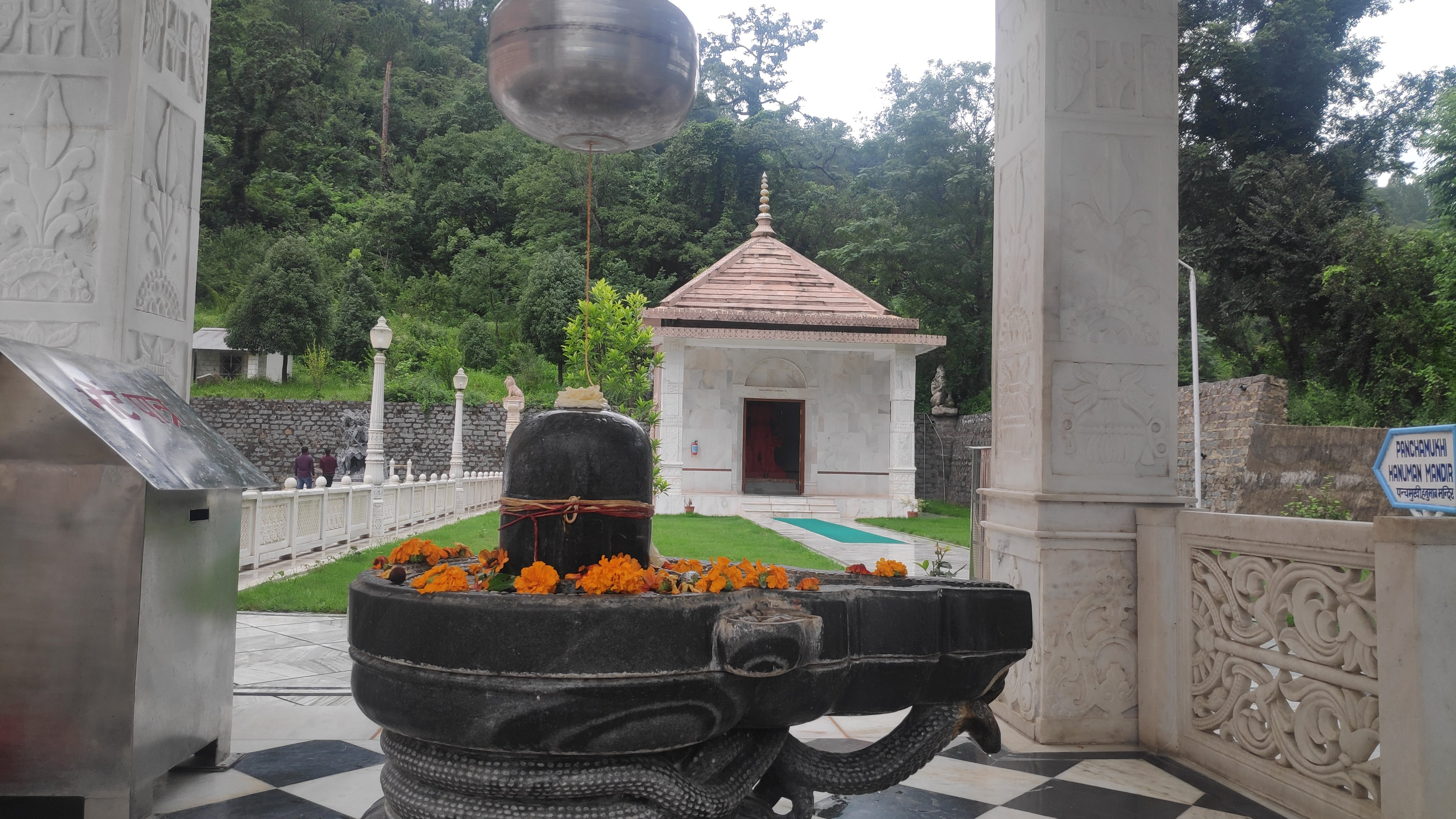
Shivling in the shrine

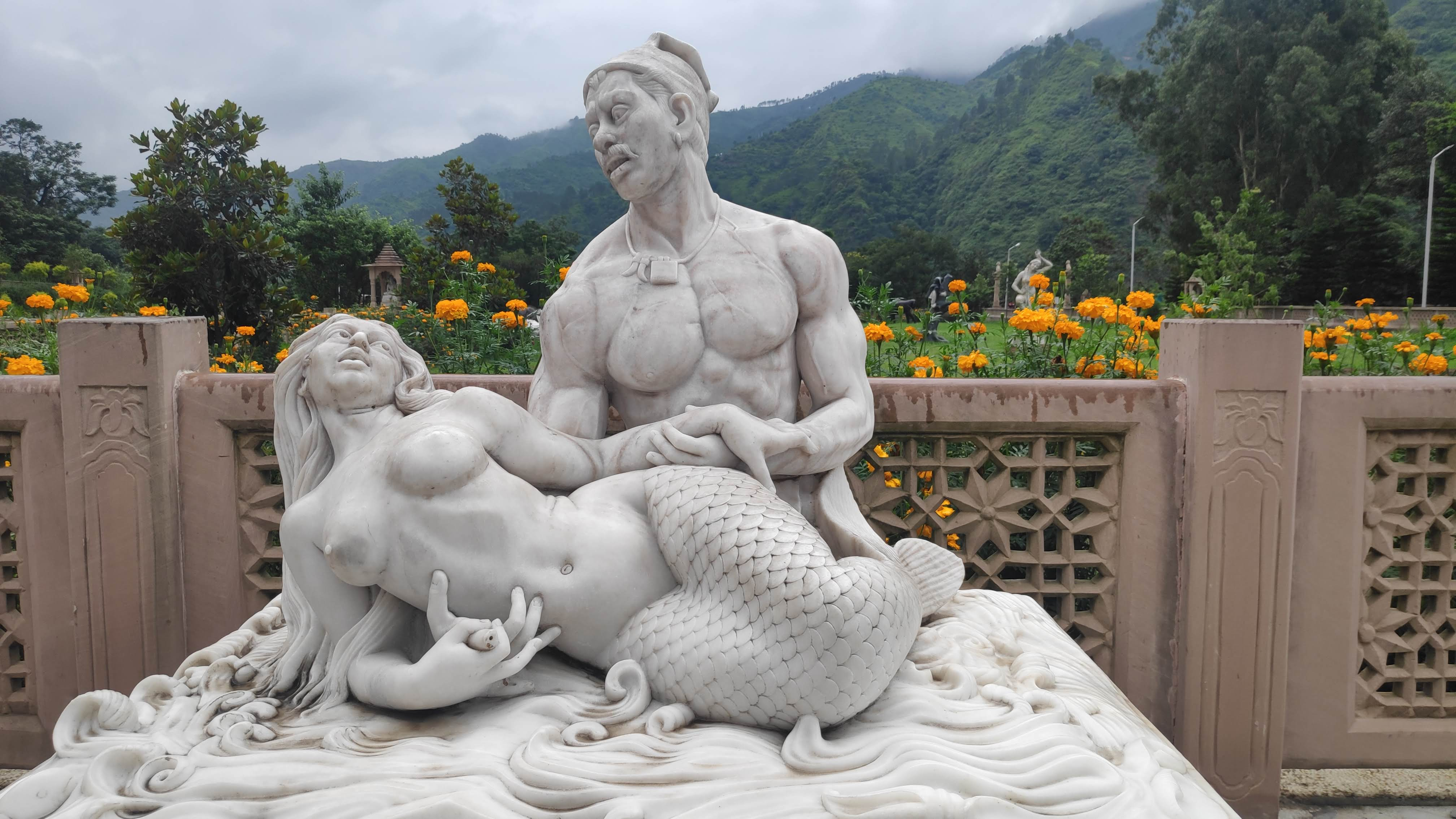
The Jalpari (water-fairy) legend
