= Ratul Puri =

Indian businessman (born 1972)

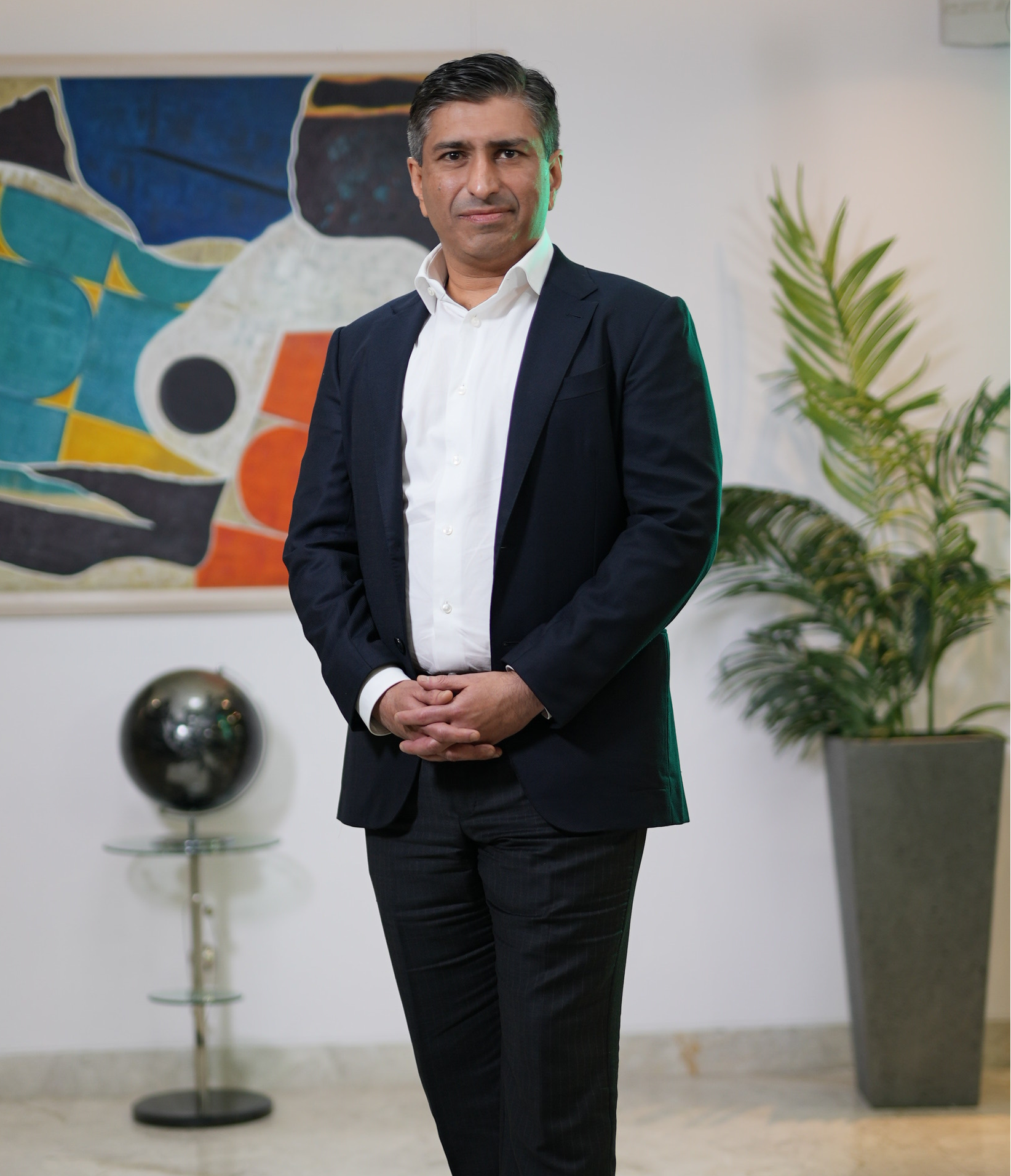
- Puri in 2022
- Born: 19 June 1972 (age 53); India
- Occupation: Businessman
- Known for: Chairman of Hindustan Powerprojects
- Spouse: Kavita
- Children: 3
- Parents: Deepak Puri (father); Nita Puri (mother)
- Website: ratulpuri.in

Ratul Puri (born 19 July 1972) is an Indian businessman who is the chairman of the Board of Hindustan Powerprojects. He was previously a senior manager in his fathers company Moser Baer.

In 2002, Puri was awarded the Ernst & Young "Entrepreneur of the Year" award for his contribution towards manufacturing industry in India.

== Early life and education ==
Ratul was born in India in 1972. He became an alumnus of Carnegie Mellon University, the Pittsburgh-based university with a bachelor's degree in computer engineering, mathematics, and computer science.

== Career ==
In 2008, Ratul started the business of power generation with Hindustan Powerprojects. Puri is the nephew of Congress party politician and former Madhya Pradesh Chief Minister Kamal Nath.

== Recognition ==
Ratul is part of a number think tanks that are evolving solutions to usher energy sufficiency in India and was part of the World Economic Forum as one of the Young Global leaders. In 2007, Business Today rated him among the "Top 21 Young Leaders" in the country who could shape India's destiny in the 21st century. Dataquest magazine has named him amongst the "Young Brigade in the IT Industry".

He was declared CMO Asia CEO of the Year award. In 2014, Puri was recognized as the ‘CEO of the year’ by World Brand Congress and acknowledged for his contribution to the infrastructure sector by ET Infrastructure.

== Investigation ==
In November 2019, the Indian Enforcement Directorate filed a charge sheet against Puri and his company Moser Baer for money laundering and bank fraud in the Agusta Westland chopper scam.
