= Rajashree =

Rajashree or Rajshree, Rajasri and Rajashri is an Indian name, an epithet of the goddess Lakshmi.

== People ==
- Rajasree (born 1945), also known as RajaSri, noted South Indian film actress of the 1960s
- Rajshree (born 1944), Indian actress who has acted in Hindi films
- Rajashree (actress), Tamil film actress
- Rajashree (novelist), Indian novelist and filmmaker
- Rajasri (writer) (1934–1994), dialogue and lyrics writer and music director in Telugu cinema industry
- Rajashree Choudhury (born 1965), Indian-born founder of USA Yoga and International Yoga Sports Federation
- Rajshree Pathy, eminent entrepreneur from Coimbatore, Tamil Nadu, India
- Rajshree Thakur (born 1981), Indian actress best known for her role as Saloni in the Hindi television drama Saat Phere
- Rajshree Ojha (born 1976), Indian film director and story writer
- Rajshri Nair (born 1977), Indian actress

== See also ==
- Rajshri Productions, Indian film company
  - Rajshri Media, its digital media arm
