= Saurabh Srivastava =

Saurabh Srivastava may refer to:

- Saurabh Srivastava (entrepreneur)
- Saurabh Srivastava (politician)
