= Pathy =

== Name ==
Pathy is a Hindic surname that may refer to

- Dinanath Pathy, Indian painter, author and art historian
- Mark Pathy, Canadian entrepreneur, and astronaut
- Rajshree Pathy, Indian entrepreneur

"Pathy" are mostly Brahmins.

== Morpheme ==
-pathy is a Greek suffix/infix/affix from "pathos" (suffering)

== See also ==
- Pathi
