= Bulandi (2000 film) =

- Directed by: T. Rama Rao
- Written by: Adesh K. Arjun (Dialogues)
- Story by: Erode Sounder
- Based on: Nattamai by Erode Sounder
- Produced by: Yogesh Anand
- Starring: Anil Kapoor; Rekha; Raveena Tandon
- Cinematography: M. S. Prabhu
- Edited by: P. Gowtham Raju
- Music by: Viju Shah
- Distributed by: Digital Entertainment
- Release date: 7 January 2000
- Running time: 175 minutes
- Country: India
- Language: Hindi

Bulandi is a 2000 Indian Hindi-language drama film directed by T. Rama Rao. It is a remake of the 1994 Tamil film Nattamai and stars Anil Kapoor in a dual role alongside Rekha and Raveena Tandon in the lead roles with an ensemble supporting cast. Rajinikanth appears in a special appearance, who reprised his role from the 1995 Telugu film Pedarayudu. It marks Rajinikanth's final Hindi film to focus on Tamil cinema.

== Plot ==
The story revolves around Dharamraj "Dada" Thakur. Since the death of his father Gajraj Thakur, Dada Thakur has been the head of the village. His family consists of his wife Lakshmi and two younger brothers, Arjun and Nakul. Dada Thakur and Lakshmi are virtually like parents to Arjun and Nakul. Dada Thakur is highly respected in society and his word is considered law. Arjun marries a city girl, Meena. At first, Meena resents her husband's subservience to his elder brother, but when she realizes that Dada Thakur helped her father in his business, she becomes respectful towards her brother-in-law. When Arjun is wrongly accused of raping a schoolteacher, everyone awaits Dada Thakur's decision, which affects everyone in the household.

In a later flashback Gajraj Thakur, the father of Dharamraj, Arjun & Nakul orders his nephew Jagannath to marry the villagers daughter whom he raped though he is the son of his sister Manorama. His brother-in-law Ranjit Singh shoots him as he is disappointed by his verdict. An enraged Gajraj Thakur gives his final verdict before dying to abandon their family for 18 years and whoever visits his house will receive the same punishment and also not to share even a glass of water with them. Gajraj Thakur also tells Dharamraj "Whenever we give a wrong verdict, that moment it is said that we die." At that second when he says that Gajraj Thakur dies. From then on, Jagannath is envious of his uncle's family and waits for an opportunity to take revenge on them. He plans to bring a lady as a teacher to the school in the village and tells her to make Arjun fall for her. She does so but Arjun refuses to betray his wife.

An angry Jagannath kills her and makes the villagers believe that she committed suicide due to Arjun's actions. Dharamraj sentences 10 years of exile for his brother's family. Now Jagannath learns of his daughter's love for the younger brother Nakul and tries to kill him with the help of his goons. Arjun goes to the rescue of his brother Nakul and a pregnant Meena goes to watch the annual festival where her water breaks and she gives birth. Meanwhile, Dharamraj fights Jagannath in a duel. Dharamraj's aunt Manorama rushes to Dharamraj and kills Jagannath. She finally reveals the truth and tells Dharamraj that he had punished his innocent brother without committing any mistake. She also tells him that all the crimes that were thrown onto Arjun were really committed by Jagannath.

Dharamraj immediately remembers his father's last words that whenever he gives a wrong verdict, that moment he dies. In that shock, Dharamraj dies knowing that he gave a wrong verdict. Now, Arjun is shown taking the ancestral throne from his brother and continues the family's traditions.

== Cast ==
- Anil Kapoor in a dual role as
  - Dharamraj "Dada" Thakur
  - Arjun Thakur
- Rekha as Laxmi Thakur
- Raveena Tandon as Meena Thakur
- Harish Kumar as Nakul Thakur
- Paresh Rawal in a dual role as
  - Gora Thakur
  - Mangala Thakur
- Sadashiv Amrapurkar as Gora's father
- Kulbhushan Kharbanda as Ram Singh Thakur
- Shakti Kapoor as Jagannath Singh
- Ranjeet as Ranjeet Singh
- Aruna Irani as Manorama Singh
- Raasi
- Rani (Raksha) as teacher Shilpa (who reprised her role from Tamil film Nattamai)
- Kalpana as Jagannath's wife
- Y. Vijaya
- Rajinikanth as Ghajraj Thakur (special appearance, who reprised his role from Telugu film Pedarayudu)

== Soundtrack ==
Bulandi

Soundtrack album by Viju Shah
- Released: 16 October 1999
- Genre: Feature film soundtrack
- Label: T-Series

The music was composed by Viju Shah and lyrics penned by Anand Bakshi. Notable playback singers Kumar Sanu, Udit Narayan, Abhijeet, Kavita Krishnamurthy, Alka Yagnik, Anuradha Paudwal, Sonu Nigam, Jaspinder Narula have rendered their voices in this album.

#	Title	Singer(s)
1	"Hungama Ho Jaaye"	Sonu Nigam, Jaspinder Narula
2	"Teri Akhiyon Main"	Udit Narayan, Kavita Krishnamurthy
3	"Teri Meri Ik Jind"	Heera Group UK, Vibha
4	"Mujhe Hichki Lagi"	Kumar Sanu, Anuradha Paudwal
5	"Ab Bujho Ri Bujho"	Udit Narayan, Jaspinder Narula
6	"Jab Gori Ne" ( Not in the Film)	Abhijeet, Alka Yagnik
7	"Saari Duniya Mein"	Udit Narayan, Kavita Krishnamurthy
8	"Humne Tumko Chun"	Kumar Sanu, Anuradha Paudwal
