= Chirunavvula Varamistava =

- Directed by: N. H. Chandra
- Written by: N. H. Chandra; Shantakumar (dialogues)
- Produced by: Mrs. Palguni Vijayakumar
- Starring: Vikram; Rani
- Cinematography: B. Kotiswara Rao
- Edited by: K. Madhu
- Music by: Vidyasagar
- Production company: Suryaa Super Vision
- Distributed by: Vijayakumar G
- Release date: 22 October 1993
- Running time: 128 mins
- Country: India
- Language: Telugu

Chirunavvula Varamistava (transl. Can you grant me a boon of smiling?) is a 1993 Indian Telugu-language romance film, written and directed by N. H. Chandra. The film stars Vikram and Rani.

== Plot ==
Vicky (Vikram), the son of a leading litigator, meets Vijaya (Rani), at college. They both initially clash with one another, however soon after Vicky falls in love with Vijaya, but Vijaya continues to resent him. In order, to win Vijaya's love Vicky ends up playing a trick; blowing out of proportion the stomach ache he gets and makes her believe that he has got cancer. On his father's insistence, taking pity on him, Vijaya agrees to act as if though she loves Vicky, just to make him happy while he is alive.

== Cast ==
- Vikram as Vicky
- Rani as Vijaya
- G. Maruti Rao as Vicky's father
- Murali Mohan as Vijaya's father
- Annapoorna as Vicky's mother
- Y. Vijaya
- Babu Mohan
- Suthi Velu
- Narra Venkateswara Rao

== Production ==
Director Nandam Harishchandra Rao cast Vikram in this film after liking his performance in Meera (1992).

== Soundtrack ==
The soundtrack album is composed by Vidyasagar. Vidyasagar later reused "Okate Korika" as "Malare Mounama" for Tamil film Karna (1995) and "Olave Mounave" for Kannada film Ganga Yamuna (1997). The song "Ennai Paada Paduthuthu" from the Tamil version reused the tune and footage of the song "Yentabagundi Basu" from Chala Bagundi (2000).

Telugu Track listing
No.	Title	Lyrics	Singer(s)	Length
1.	"Allatappa Pilladamo"			04:32
2.	"Chirunavvula Varamistava"	Vennelakanti	S. P. Balasubrahmanyam	03:23
3.	"Okate Korika"			04:03
4.	"Oyele"			05:19
5.	"Vachannu Vayasu"			05:28
6.	"Yemito Ente"			03:57

Tamil track listing
No.	Title	Length
1.	"Aadipatti Aasai"	04:32
2.	"Ennai Paada Paduthuthu"	03:23
3.	"Kaathal Thangakiliye"	04:03
4.	"Malaiye"	05:19
5.	"Oyile Oyile"	05:28
6.	"Pattam Poochi Pattalam"	03:57
7.	"Chokku Smilea"	04:55

== Dubbed version ==
It was dubbed and released in Tamil as Vicky in 2002, shortly after the success of Gemini, in which the lead pair had featured. The Tamil version featured the song "Yentabagundi Basu" from Chala Bagundi (featuring Raghava Lawrence, Mumtaj, Vadde Naveen and Srikanth) an additional song featuring Raju Sundaram and Ramya Krishnan. Several of the Telugu supporting actors were not featured in the Tamil version.
