= Mrs. Bectors Food =

Indian consumer goods company

Mrs. Bectors Food Specialties Limited
- Company type: Public
- Traded as: BSE: 543253; NSE: BECTORFOOD
- Founded: 1977
- Founder: Rajni Bector
- Headquarters: Ludhiana, Punjab, India
- Brands: Cremica; English Oven
- Revenue: ▲₹1,623 crore (US$170 million) (FY24)
- Net income: ▲₹140 crore (US$15 million) (FY24)
- Subsidiaries: Mrs. Bectors English Oven Limited
- Website: bectorfoods.com

Mrs. Bectors Food Specialties Limited is an Indian multinational fast-moving consumer goods (FMCG) company.

== History ==
Established in 1977 by Rajni Bector and headquartered in Ludhiana, Punjab, the company manufactures and markets various types of biscuits, including cookies, creams, crackers, digestives, and glucose, under its flagship brand "Mrs Bector's Cremica". Its products are also marketed under the brand name "English Oven".

The company exports its products to 60 countries. It also supplies Indian government entities such as Indian Railways and government canteens and has supply relationships with multinational fast food companies like McDonald's, Subway, and Yum! Brands.

In 2006, Goldman Sachs invested in the company but sold its stake in 2010 to a private equity firm. The company was listed on the National Stock Exchange of India in December 2020.

== Tax investigation ==
On October 17, 2023, the Income Tax Department searched the company's offices. Documents were seized and bank lockers and accounts searched. The company denied wrongdoing.
