= Meril Life Sciences =

Indian multinational medical device company

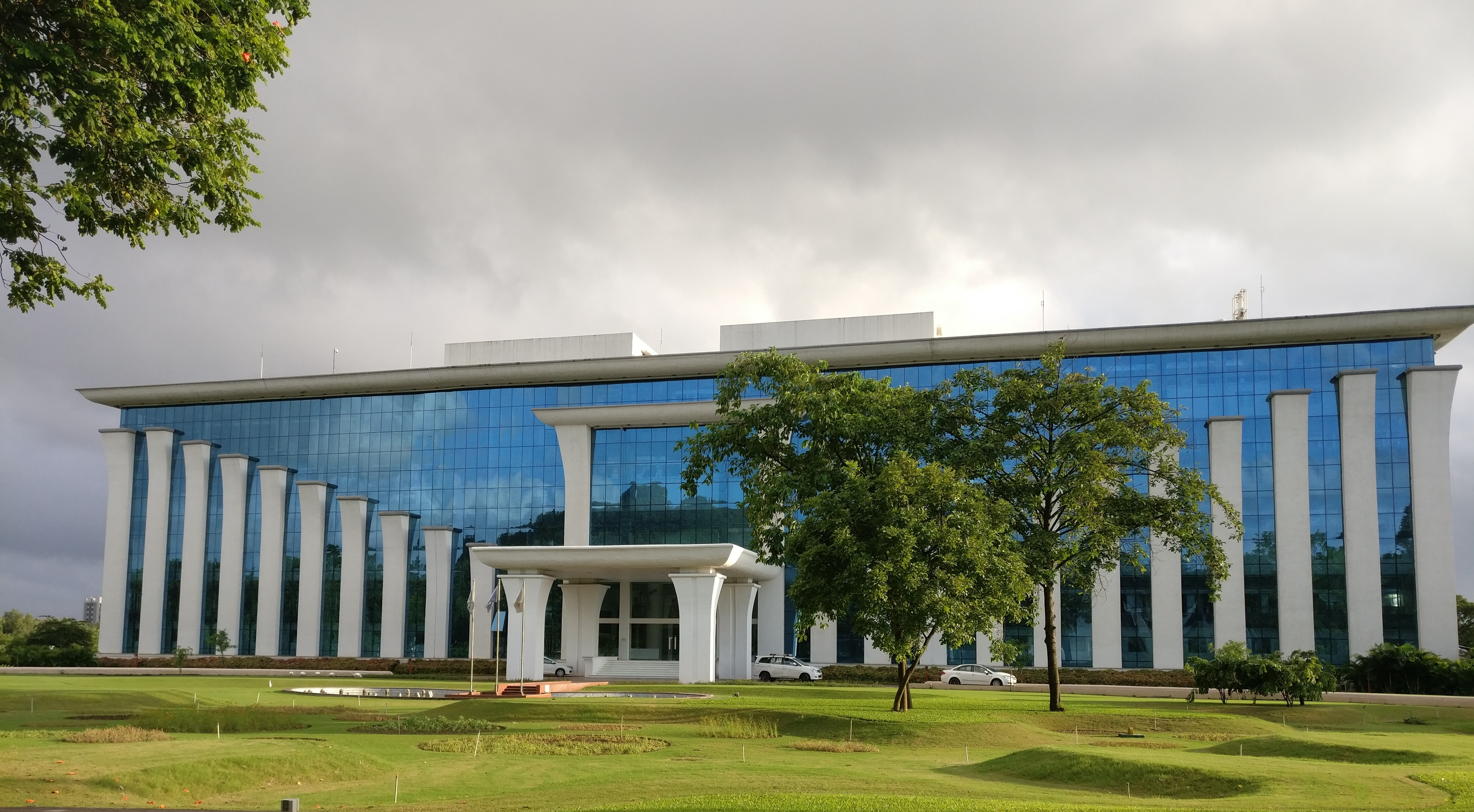
- Headquarters at Vapi, Gujarat
- Type: Private
- Industry: Medical device Health care
- Founded: 2006; 20 years ago
- Headquarters: Vapi, Gujarat, India
- Area served: Worldwide
- Revenue: ▲₹2,400 crore (US$249 million) (2023)
- Owner: Bilakhia Group
- Number of employees: 10000+ (2024)
- Parent: Bilakhia Holdings
- Website: www.merillife.com

Meril Life Sciences is an Indian multinational medical device company, with headquarters in Vapi, Gujarat, India. It was founded in 2006 and is a part of the Bilakhia Group. The company is engaged in the manufacturing of vascular intervention devices, orthopedic implants, robotics, endosurgery, ENT products and in-vitro diagnostics. Meril Life Sciences operates in over 150 countries and has employed 10000 people, as of 2024.

It develops and manufactures healthcare technologies and therapies. The company has also developed the MeRes100 bioresorbable scaffold (BRS), which is India's first domestically produced bio-resorbable scaffold for the treatment of coronary artery disease.

Its key innovations also include the indigenously developed Myval transcatheter aortic valve system for treating aortic stenosis—recognized internationally. MISSO, a robotic-assisted surgical system for orthopedic joint replacement procedures; designed and manufactured in India. And, the recently launched MyClip, an indigenously developed device for mitral valve repair via the transcatheter edge-to-edge repair (TEER) procedure.

== History ==
Meril Life Sciences was established in 2006 as a part of the Bilakhia Group's healthcare diversification plan.

In February 2022, the company raised funding of US$210 million (₹15.75 billion crores) from the private equity firm Warburg Pincus, facilitated through its Dutch affiliate, South Elm Investments BV.

In November 2023, the company entered into an agreement with the medtech company Japan Lifeline, granting exclusive rights for Japan Lifeline to promote Meril's transcatheter heart valve, Myval Octacor, upon approval by the Pharmaceuticals and Medical Devices Agency in Japan.

In 2024, Meril officially launched MISSO, its indigenously developed robotic-assisted surgical system, aimed at enhancing precision and consistency in orthopedic joint replacement procedures.

In October 2024, Prime Minister Narendra Modi virtually inaugurated Meril’s new medical devices manufacturing facility in Vapi, Gujarat. Set up under the Production Linked Incentive (PLI) scheme, the facility supports the vision of Atmanirbhar Bharat by strengthening domestic innovation and self-reliance in medtech.

In 2024, the LANDMARK trial results for the Myval THV series were presented at EuroPCR and published in The Lancet, a leading medical journal. The study confirmed Myval’s non-inferiority to other transcatheter heart valves, marking a key clinical milestone for Meril.

In 2025, Meril expanded its vascular intervention portfolio with the introduction of MyClip, a made-in-India device designed for mitral valve repair through the TEER (transcatheter edge-to-edge repair) procedure.

== Operations ==
It operates in more than 150 countries. It has established subsidiaries in countries such as the United States, Germany, Turkey, Brazil, South Africa, China, and Bangladesh.

It is also engaged in sale of specific medical devices like Surgical Robots to hospitals. The company has established research and development (R&D) facilities focusing on orthopedics, endosurgery, cardiovascular and in-vitro diagnostics. As of February 2017, the company derived 50 percent of its revenue from international operations.

== Products ==
Meril Life Sciences is engaged in the development and manufacturing of medical devices used in various medical fields. In December 2018, Meril Life Sciences introduced the indigenously designed and manufactured Myval Transcatheter Aortic Heart Valve (TAVR), making it the first Indian company to commercially launch Transcatheter Aortic Heart Valve replacement (TAVR) Therapy in the global market. The Myval TAVR technology received approval from the Central Drugs Standard Control Organization (CDSCO) in November 2018 and obtained European Conformity in June 2019.

In March 2021 Meril Life Sciences launched the MeRes100 BRS, a 100-micron Bioresorbable scaffold, which received approvals from the Drug Controller General of India and European Conformity. In February 2022, the National Pharmaceutical Pricing Authority, India's pharmaceutical regulator, granted a five-year rare exemption from price control for MeRes100 BRS under the provision of the Drug Price Control Order 2013. The development of MeRes100 took around two to three years to complete.

The company also has a range of surgical sutures, including absorbable and non-absorbable options like polydioxanone sutures, PGA & PGLA absorbable sutures, polyester sutures, and polypropylene sutures. It manufactures diagnostic equipment, reagents, and rapid tests for diseases such as Dengue, HIV 1 and 2, hCG, Ag, HCV, and Malaria.

In 2024, Meril introduced MISSO, a robotic-assisted surgical system developed in India to enhance precision in orthopedic joint replacement procedures. The system is designed to assist surgeons with consistent alignment and improved intraoperative control, supporting better clinical outcomes.

In 2025, Meril introduced MyClip, a transcatheter device developed in India for mitral valve repair using the edge-to-edge repair (TEER) technique. The device is designed to offer a minimally invasive treatment option for patients with mitral regurgitation, aiming to improve procedural efficiency and patient outcomes.

In 2025, Meril introduced MIZZO Endo 4000, an advanced soft-tissue surgical robotic system developed in India for minimally invasive procedures. The platform supports multiple specialities, including general surgery, gynaecology, urology, gastrointestinal surgery, and oncology. It features AI-based 3D visualisation and a 5G-enabled telesurgery framework to assist surgeons with enhanced precision and control.

== COVID-19 ==
During the COVID-19 pandemic in 2020, Meril manufactured its RT-PCR COVID-19 test kit. In June 2020, Meril Diagnostics was among the seven companies authorized by the Indian Council of Medical Research to manufacture the Covid Kavach ELISA IgG antibody test using Anti-body technology.

The company developed CoviFind, a self-use Rapid antigen test for COVID-19, which received approval from the Indian Council of Medical Research in June 2021, and is designed to provide results within approximately 15 minutes for individuals with a medium to high viral load of the virus. In August 2021, cricketer Mahendra Singh Dhoni was appointed as the brand ambassador for CoviFind. He appeared in two digital films and TV commercials, promoting testing to consumers.

== Other activities ==
Meril runs the Meril Academy which provides education and training to healthcare personnel. It has organized numerous workshops and conferences in specialties including general surgery, diagnostics, orthopedics, interventional cardiology, operation theater nursing, and hospital management. Since then, the initiative has grown into a global network, with 12 academies now established across key international locations.

== Awards and recognition ==
- It won the Frost & Sullivan's Emerging Medical Technology Company of the Year at the India Healthcare Excellence Award in 2015.
- In 2017, the Government of India's Department of Pharmaceuticals awarded the company with the India Medical Devices Company of the Year Award and the India Medical Devices Export Company of the Year Award.
- In 2017, Meril Life Sciences was awarded the Innovative Model for CSR implementation award by the Gujarat CSR Authority, Government of Gujarat, at the National CSR Conclave.
- In 2018, it received the Company of the Year Award in the Indian Cardiac Stents Provider category by Frost & Sullivan.
- In 2019, Meril Life Sciences was awarded the SME Business Excellence Award in the Mid-Corporate category by Dun & Bradstreet and RBL Bank.
- It received the Best Employer Award at the National Best Employer Brand Awards 2019 and 2022 by the Employer Branding Institute.
- The company won the Indian Medical Device Innovation of the Year award at the 7th edition of India Pharma and Indian Medical Device 2022, by the Department of Pharmaceuticals and the Federation of Indian Chambers of Commerce and Industry (FICCI). The award was given by Bhagwanth Khuba, the Minister of State for the Ministry of Chemicals and Fertilisers, in April 2022.
- Meril Life was named on the 2023 list of top health tech companies by the Healthcare Technology Report.
- In October 2023, the company received the WIPO National Award for Inventors from the World Intellectual Property Organization.
- Meril was named among the Top 100 Health Tech Companies of 2023 by Becker’s Hospital Review.
- The company was recognized as one of India’s Top 10 InVitro Diagnostics Manufacturers and among the Top 10 Most Promising In Vitro Diagnostics Manufacturers.
- The company received the Blackbuck Outstanding Researcher Award for contributions to healthcare innovation.
- In 2025, Meril’s MISSO Robotic System won Best Medical Technology at the Modi Prix Galien Awards, India.
- In 2025, Meril honoured as the Disruptive Healthcare Brand of the Year and Service Provider of the Year (Medical Devices) at the Economic Times Healthcare Awards.
- In 2025, Meril recognised as one of the Most Preferred Workplaces for Women 2025–26 by Marksmen Daily.
