= Gafurbhai M. Bilakhia =

Indian industrialist and philanthropist

- Occupations: Industrialist, philanthropist
- Known for: Founder of Bilakhia Group, Meril Life Sciences, Maa Foundation & Micro Life Sciences
- Awards: Padma Shri (2020)

Gafurbhai M. Bilakhia is an Indian industrialist and philanthropist, known for his contributions to trade, industry, and social welfare. He is the founder of the Bilakhia Group, which operates in healthcare, education, and technology. In 2020, he was awarded the Padma Shri, for his contributions to industry.

== Career ==
Bilakhia started his career in Vapi, Gujarat, managing a warehouse before identifying opportunities in the printing inks industry. He later founded Micro Inks, which became one of the largest ink manufacturers globally. Over time, the Bilakhia Group expanded into medical technology, education, and philanthropy.

== Recognition ==
In 2020, Bilakhia received the Padma Shri for his contributions to trade and industry.

== Legacy ==
Known as Bapuji, Bilakhia's sons currently manage the Bilakhia Group, ensuring the continuation of his vision and leadership.

== See also ==
- Meril Life Sciences
