= Hindustan Power =

Indian electrical power company

- Industry: Energy
- Founded: 2008; 18 years ago
- Headquarters: 239, Okhla Industrial Estate, Phase-III, New Delhi, Delhi, India
- Area served: India
- Key people: Ratul Puri (Chairman)
- Website: Official website & Ratul Puri's Official Blog

Hindustan Power is an electrical power developer in India, headquartered in New Delhi. Founded by Ratul Puri, it operates in power generation, power trading, EPC, and development and renewables across thermal, solar, hydro and mining vertical markets. The company holds assets of around ₹ 14,500 crore to date, and is the fastest growing integrated power company in India.

The company is headquartered in New Delhi, India. Hindustan Power plans to commission new power projects by the year 2020 in thermal, hydro and solar sectors. The company is at an advanced stage of commissioning over 5000 MW by 2017 of combined power assets at an estimated investment of INR 32,000 crores (US$5.15 bn).

Ratul Puri is the company Chairman. Awadh Bihari Giri is the CEO of the Hydro division; Birendra Kumar Sinha, President, Coal; Lajpat Shrivastav is the CEO of Thermal; Rajya Wardhan Ghei is the CEO of India Solar Business; Arun Kanchan is the CEO of New Business, and Dr. Harish Ahuja is the President for Strategy and Corporate Affairs.

Hindustan Power recently announced to plan its Unit IPO. The company backed by Blackstone Group LP (BX), plans to sell shares in its solar unit as it prepares to double investment in photovoltaic projects to $50 billion by 2016. The unit has a pipeline of projects that will require $45 billion of investment within the next two years.

== Divisions and operations ==
Hindustan Cleanenergy (Solar business) was incorporated in September 2008 to undertake development of solar projects in India and abroad to deliver clean energy. It is India's largest solar power development company, with solar projects under development across multiple states in India and strategic international markets like Germany, Italy, Japan, United States and United Kingdom. The solar arm of HPPPL was responsible for India's first 5 MW solar farm along with Asia's first 30 MW farm. Hindustan Cleanenergy is the largest solar farm developer in India with an installed capacity of ~ 350 MW generating carbon savings of approximately 500000 tonnes per year. The international solar business has an installed solar capacity of over 120 MW across locations like Germany, Italy, UK and US. The company is working towards launching the country's first 1 GW solar plant by the end of 2016 by launching IPO in end 2014 or early 2015.

Hindustan Thermalprojects (Thermal business) division of HPPPL was incorporated in 2008 with the aim of foraying into infrastructure and thermal power. Operations include coal or gas based generation, transmission and distribution. The company aims to build a thermal generation portfolio of 5000-6000 MW by 2020. Current projects include three ventures in Madhya Pradesh and Chhattisgarh, with a combined generation capacity of around 5000 MW. The company's 2520 MW thermal power project at Anuppur, Madhya Pradesh is slated for commission in 2014. Hindustan Thermalprojects, the thermal business of Hindustan Powerprojects (HPPPL) won the National Safety Council (NSCI) award towards implementing effective occupational safety and health practices in its Anuppur unit in Madhya Pradesh. This is the second time in row for this plant.

Natural Resources (Mining business) began its operations in 2008 for building coal assets in India and abroad to support the company's coal-based thermal segment and become a prominent coal supplier to contribute to HPPPL's organic growth. It also provides consultancy services to the mineral industry in form of planning, operation optimization and value addition. The division's first mining project resulted in form of a joint venture with Chhattisgarh Mineral Development Corporation Limited, a Government of Chhattisgarh undertaking, as a partner for development of a commercial coal block.
