= Ganga Yamuna =

- Theatrical release poster
- Directed by: S. Mahendar
- Written by: S. V. Krishna Reddy
- Produced by: Ghouse Peer; B. P. Thayagaraj
- Starring: Shiva Rajkumar; Malashri; Ravinder Maan; Suhasini
- Cinematography: Ramesh Babu
- Edited by: P. R. Soundar Raj
- Music by: Vidyasagar
- Production company: Megha Productions
- Release date: 4 April 1997
- Running time: 144 minutes
- Country: India
- Language: Kannada

Ganga Yamuna is a 1997 Indian Kannada-language romance drama film directed by S. Mahendar and produced by Ghouse Peer. The film stars Shiva Rajkumar, Malashri and newcomer Ravinder Maan. Actress Suhasini Maniratnam featured in a cameo role. The film is a remake of 1994 Telugu film Subhalagnam.

== Cast ==
- Shiva Rajkumar as Shankar
- Malashri
- Ravinder Mann
- Mukhyamantri Chandru
- Shobharaj
- Doddanna
- Sadhu Kokila
- Rekha Das
- Girija Lokesh
- Honnavalli Krishna
- Suhasini in a guest appearance

== Soundtrack ==
The soundtrack of the film was composed by Vidyasagar. The song "Olave Mounave" was reused from his own composition "Okate Korika" from the Telugu film Chirunavvula Varamistava (1993) while the other song "Priya Ninna Neeli" was reused from "Jab Se Tumko Dekha" from the Hindi film Damini.

Track listing
No.	Title	Lyrics	Singer(s)	Length
1.	"Olave Mounave"	R. N. Jayagopal	S. P. Balasubrahmanyam, S. Janaki
2.	"Priye Ninna Neeli Kannali"	R. N. Jayagopal	S. P. Balasubrahmanyam, S. Janaki
3.	"Banthu Banthu Maina"	R. N. Jayagopal	S. P. Balasubrahmanyam, S. Janaki
4.	"Nee Hele Giniye"	R. N. Jayagopal	S. P. Balasubrahmanyam
5.	"Noorondu Aase"	R. N. Jayagopal	Rajesh Krishnan, K. S. Chithra
6.	"Shrungara Sowbhagya"	R. N. Jayagopal	S. P. Balasubrahmanyam, S. Janaki
