= Rani (Tamil actress) =

Indian actress

- Other names: "O Podu" Rani; Raksha
- Occupations: Actress, television presenter and producer

Rani, also known as Raksha, is an Indian actress who appears in Tamil, Telugu, Kannada and Hindi-language films. She is best known for the song "O Podu" from Gemini, sung by Anuradha Sriram and picturised on her, and is often referred to as "O Podu" Rani. She won the Andhra Pradesh government Nandi award for best supporting actress for the film Nachavule (2008).

== Filmography ==
Year	Film	Role	Language	Notes
1992	Johny Walker	Chandini	Malayalam	Debut film
1992	Uncle Bun	Asha James	Malayalam	
1992	Priyapetta Kukku	Anu	Malayalam	
1992	Daddy	Shyama	Malayalam	
1992	Villu Pattukaran	Abhirami	Tamil	
1993	Chirunavvula Varamistava	Vijaya	Telugu	
1993	I Love India		Tamil	Special appearance
1994	Nattamai	Teacher	Tamil	
1994	Pathavi Pramanam		Tamil	Special appearances
1994	Namma Annachi		Tamil	Special appearances
1995	Raasaiyya		Tamil	Special appearances
1995	Karnaa		Tamil	Special appearances
1996	Andha Naal	Poornitha	Tamil	
1996	Avvai Shanmughi	Kousalya (Kousi)	Tamil	
1996	Kadhal Kottai		Tamil	Special appearance Vellarikka song
1997	Pudhalvan		Tamil	Special appearances
1997	Kadhal Palli		Tamil	Special appearances
1997	Oka Chinna Maata	Sireesha	Telugu	
1997	Ayyinda Leda	Agni Sakshi	Telugu	
1997	Gokulamlo Seeta	Shobana	Telugu	
1997	Rukmini	Nurse	Telugu	
1998	O Panaipothundi Babu		Telugu	
1998	Ulta Palta	Mohini	Telugu	
1998	One Man Army	Jhansi	Kannada	
1998	Yaare Neenu Cheluve		Kannada	Special appearance
1999	Yamajathakudu	Nirajaveni	Telugu	
1999	Edhirum Pudhirum		Tamil	Special appearances
1999	Sivan		Tamil	Special appearances
1999	Nenjinile		Tamil	Special appearances
1999	Olympiyan Anthony Adam	Ammu Issac	Malayalam	
1999	Chandranudikkunna Dikkil	Parthan's Love Interest	Malayalam	Special appearance
2000	Bulandi	Teacher	Hindi	
2000	Uyirile Kalanthathu		Tamil	Special appearance
2001	Kurigalu Saar Kurigalu	Kerala Kutty	Kannada	
2001	Baava Baamaida		Kannada	
2002	Gemini	Kamini	Tamil	
2002	Game		Tamil	Special appearance
2002	Indra		Telugu	Special appearance
2003	Kadhal Sadugudu		Tamil	Special appearance
2004	Varnajalam		Tamil	
2008	Nachavule	Luv's mother	Telugu	
2008	Pandhayam	Chinna Maami	Tamil	Special appearance
2009	Bumper Offer	Aishwarya's mother	Telugu	
2010	Nagavalli	Lakshmi Devi	Telugu	
2012	Nippu	Devi	Telugu	
2012	Ooh La La La	Surya's mother	Tamil	
2012	Racha		Telugu	
2012	Mem Vayasuku Vacham	Lucky's mother	Telugu	
2012	Vennela 1 1/2		Telugu	
2013	Pavitra	Munna's aunt	Telugu	
2014	Emo Gurram Egaravachu	Neelaveni's mother	Telugu	
2014	Brother of Bommali	Shruti's mother	Telugu	
2015	Rudhramadevi	Dancer	Telugu	Special appearance
2016	Pagiri	Madhu's mother	Tamil	
2017	Chitrangada	Sarita	Telugu	
2017	Duvvada Jagannadham	DJ's Aunt	Telugu	
2018	Pakka	Nattamai's wife	Tamil	

=== Television ===
Year	Serial	Role	Network	Language
2017	Vamsam	Keerthi	Sun TV	Tamil
2018	Nandini	Mallika	Sun TV; Udaya TV	Tamil Kannada
2023	Seetha Raman	Archana	Zee Tamil	Tamil
