= Deepak Puri =

Indian businessman

- Education: Mechanical engineering - Imperial College London
- Occupations: Chairman, Moser Baer
- Spouse: Nita Puri
- Children: Ratul Puri
- Website: https://www.hindustanpower.in/leadership/ratul-puri

Deepak Puri was the founder, chairman and managing director of Moser Baer, which was liquidated in 2018 due to insolvency.

Puri initially worked as junior executive with the oil company ESSO – in 1962 at Kolkata, and later with Shalimar Paints. In 1964, Puri floated his first company, Metal Industries in Calcutta, trading in aluminum wires and furniture. Two years later, he moved into manufacturing as well. Due to labour issues at Calcutta, he decided to migrate to New Delhi in 1983, where he started Moser Baer India joint venture with Switzerland-based Moser Baer.

== Education ==
Puri holds an undergraduate degree from Imperial College, London, and completed his education at St. Stephen's College and Modern School, New Delhi. He was also conferred the degree of Doctor of Philosophy (D.Phil.), honoris causa, in recognition of his exemplary efforts by Amity University.

== Personal life ==
Deepak Puri is the father of Ratul Puri, Chairman of Hindustan Power.

== Award ==
- Padma Shri award for his contribution to the growth of Indian industry in January 2010.
- ‘Electronics Man of the Year 2002’ recognition from ELCINA
- ‘IT Man of the Year’ by top IT publication Dataquest
- ‘Entrepreneur of the Year’ award
- ‘Innovator of the year’ by CNBC-TV18 for the year 2009
