= Ved Rattan Mohan =

Indian entrepreneur

- Born: Ghaziabad, Uttar Pradesh, India
- Died: 1973
- Occupation: Entrepreneur
- Known for: Old Monk
- Awards: 1967 Padma Shri; 1971 Padma Bhushan

Ved Rattan Mohan (died 1973) was an Indian entrepreneur and the creator of Old Monk, an iconic vatted Indian dark rum. Born to Narendra Nath Mohan, the founder of Mohan Meakin, he took over the company in 1969 after the death of his father. During his tenure as the managing director, the company expanded to add three distilleries and two breweries and added new lines of business such as breakfast food and juices, glass manufacturing, vinegars, and cold storage. He also introduced, Solan No. 1 and Golden Eagle, two popular liquor brands, besides Old Monk. He was the mayor of Lucknow for two terms and served as a member of Rajya Sabha. He sought the patronage of elder statesman Nirmal Chandra Chaturvedi, MLC for initiation in civic activities. The Government of India awarded him the Padma Shri, the fourth highest civilian award, in 1967. He received the Padma Bhushan, the third highest civilian award, in 1971.

Mohan died in 1970, at the age of 45. Rocky Mohan, who is no longer associated with Mohan Meakin, was his son and former managing director of the company, Kapil Mohan, was his brother.
