= Sikshana =

Sikshana is a grassroots effort at improving learning levels in public schools of developing countries like India. It was started by Sivasri Trust, a small non-profit organization, in Bangalore, India.

== The scaling challenge ==
India is a developing country with a large and growing population. The challenge of providing primary education to about 250 million children in over 30 different languages is a task that stretches the capacity of any single agency - private, public or the State.

Sikshana uses an inclusive model of participation which brings together all the stake holders in children's education - the local public school, its teaching staff, community of parents, local government bodies, private foundations and volunteers from around the world.

Its approach is to apply the management concepts that have been successfully applied in industry for solving problems of quality and scale.

The State Government of Karnataka has an 'adoption' program for its public schools wherein private organizations can partner with the State in improving the quality of public education. Sikshana started by adopting three schools in 2001. The project has expanded over the years to about 130 schools covering 20,000 children. In 2012-13 Sikshana was running nearly 1200 Government Schools. In North Karanataka it covers Dharawd district all thalukas, Kundgol, Kalaghtagi, Navalagund, Hubali, Dharawad.

== Partners ==
Sikshana is supported by Asha for Education, Charities Aid Foundation, Give India Foundation, Vibha and Association for India's Development (Columbus and TAMU chapters).
