= Prashanth Prakash =

Indian entrepreneur

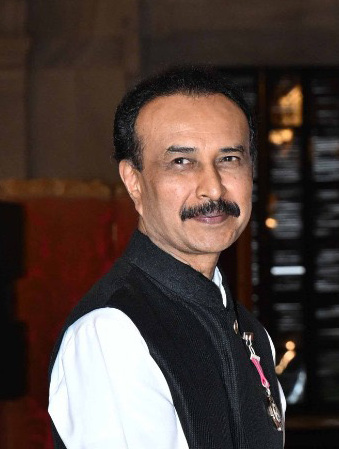
- Prakash in 2025
- Education: Bangalore University; University of Delaware
- Occupations: Venture Capitalist, entrepreneur
- Spouse: Amitha Prashanth
- Awards: Padma Shri (2025)

Prashanth Prakash is an Indian entrepreneur and venture capitalist based in Bengaluru. He is the founding partner of Accel India. He received the Padma Shri in 2025 from the Government of India for his contribution to trade and industry.

== Career ==
In 1995, Prashanth Prakash founded Visual Reality, one of India’s first animation companies. In 1997 he founded NetKraft, an offshore solutions company focusing on retail and healthcare.

Since 2004, he has been a venture capitalist for Indian startups. As a partner at Accel, Prakash has invested in Indian startups such as Flipkart, Ola, Freshworks, Book My Show, Swiggy and Bounce.

In 2008, Prakash, along with Subrata Mitra and Mahendran Balachandran, founded the Indian branch of the US venture capital firm Accel.

In 2021, he was appointed as an advisor to the Chief Minister of Karnataka, B. S. Yediyurappa. Prakash is also part of the Vision Group for Startups for the Government of Karnataka. He is also part of the National Startup Advisory Council.

In October 2024, Prakash became the joint owner of the Bengaluru franchise team in the second season of the Global e-Cricket Premier League (GEPL). Nikhil Kamath is one of the joint owners with him.

In August 2022, Prashanth Prakash partnered with the Indian Institute of Science (IISc) to set up a geriatrics wing as part of IISc's upcoming Bagchi-Parthasarathy Hospital. He is also the founding patron of the Longevity India initiative in IISc and the co-founder of the UnboxingBLR Foundation.

== Philanthropy ==
Prashanth has helped Sikshana, an organisation working to improve the education in schools, in expanding their work from 10 to 100 schools.

In 2021, Prashanth Prakash, in collaboration with other venture capitalists, established a ₹100 crore (equivalent to ₹122 crore or US$13 million in 2026) COVID-19 fund and created grants to encourage start-ups focused on developing products and services to tackle COVID-19 pandemic-related concerns. The investors did not take a stake in the sponsored ventures.

== Bibliography ==
Prashanth Prakash has co-authored a book titled Unboxing Bengaluru - The City of New Beginnings. It was launched by the 22nd Chief Minister of Karnataka, Sri Siddaramaiah.

== Awards and honours ==
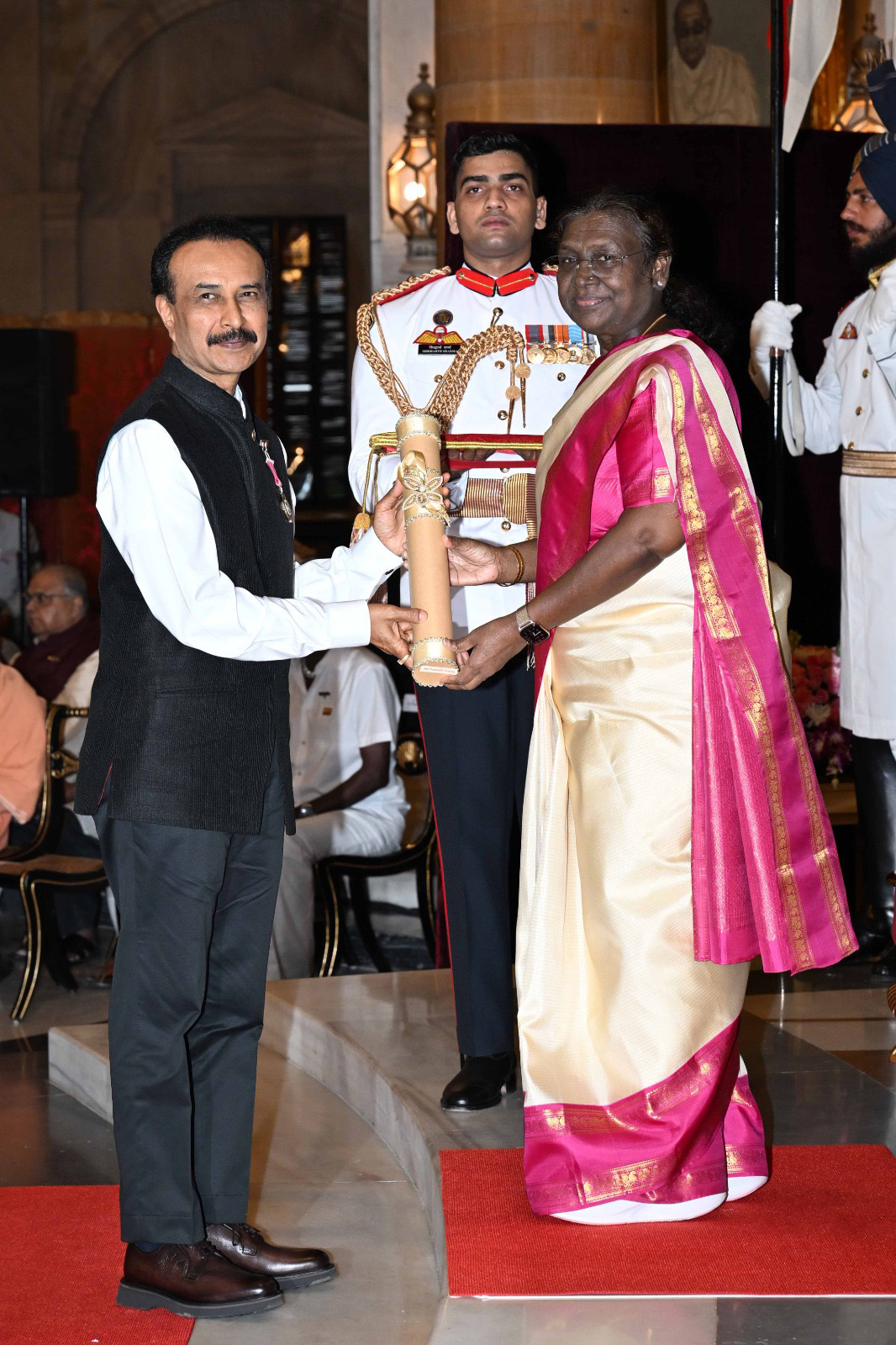
The President, Smt. Droupadi Murmu presenting the Padma Shri Award to Shri Prashanth Prakash at the Civil Investiture Ceremony-II at Rashtrapati Bhavan, in New Delhi on May 27, 2025.

- Padma Shri (2025) for contributions in trade and industry.
- Social Impact Leader 2021 for his philanthropic work by ASSOCHAM.
