= Osamu Suzuki (businessman) =

Japanese businessman (1930–2024)

Osamu Suzuki 鈴木 修
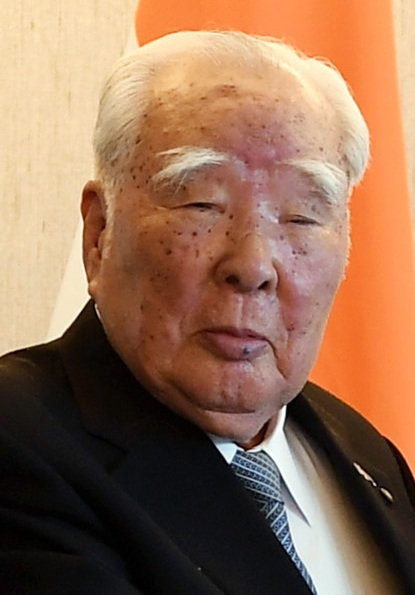
- Suzuki in 2022
- Born: Osamu Matsuda; January 30, 1930; Gero, Empire of Japan
- Died: December 25, 2024 (aged 94); Hamamatsu, Japan
- Employer: Suzuki (1958–2021)
- Title: President and CEO of Suzuki (1978–2000); Chairman of Suzuki (2000–2021)
- Spouse: Shoko Suzuki
- Children: 3; including Toshihiro
- Parent(s): Toshiki S. Matsuda; Shunzo
- Awards: Padma Vibhushan; Sitara-e-Pakistan; Middle Cross with the Star Order of Merit
- Website: Official web page of Suzuki Motor Corporation

Osamu Suzuki (鈴木 修, Suzuki Osamu; né Matsuda 松田; January 30, 1930 – December 25, 2024) was a Japanese businessman and the chairman of Suzuki Motor Corporation. From 1978, Suzuki was the CEO, president, and chairman of the company. In February 2021, Suzuki announced that he would retire in June 2021 and assume the role of adviser.

== Life ==
Osamu Matsuda was born in Gero, Gifu Prefecture, Empire of Japan, to Toshiki S. Matsuda and Shunzo on January 30, 1930. After graduating from Chuo University in 1953, Osamu started his career as a loan officer at a local bank.

He married Shoko Suzuki, the granddaughter of the patriarch of Suzuki Motor Corporation, Michio Suzuki, in the late 1950s. As the Suzuki family did not have a male heir, Osamu followed the Japanese custom of taking his wife's family name, becoming Osamu Suzuki. He became the fourth adopted son to run the company.

Shoko and Osamu Suzuki had three children and lived in Hamamatsu, Shizuoka Prefecture. Suzuki died from lymphoma at a hospital in Hamamatsu on December 25, 2024, at the age of 94.

== Career ==
Osamu Suzuki joined Suzuki Motor Corporation in April of 1958 and eventually rose to the rank of director in November of 1963. He became the junior managing director in 1967 and was promoted to the post of senior managing director in 1972. In 1978, Osamu became the president and the chief executive officer of the corporation, and, in 2000, he stepped down from his post as CEO to take the chairmanship of Suzuki Motor Corporation.

Having led Suzuki Motor Corporation for over three decades, Osamu Suzuki was reported to be one of the longest-serving leaders in the global auto industry.

== Career highlights ==
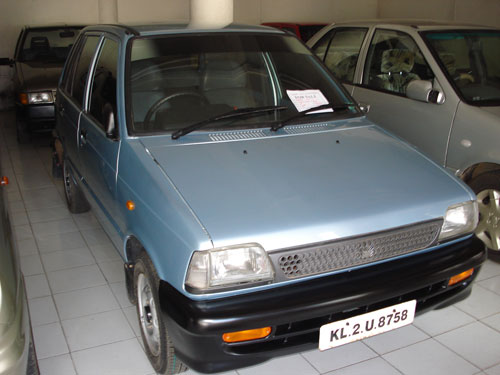
Maruti 800 AC

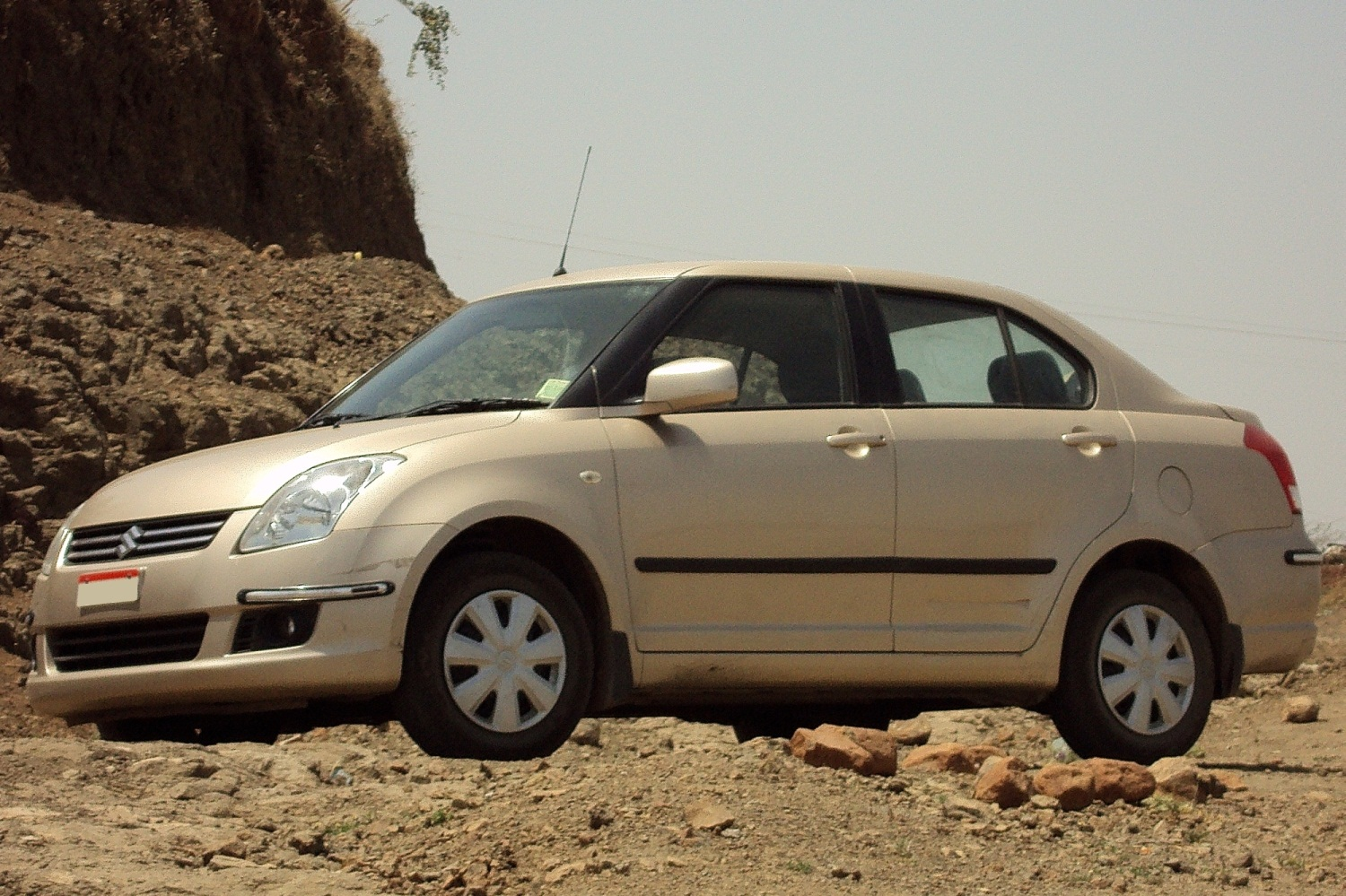
Maruti Suzuki Swift Dzire

Osamu Suzuki played a role in the growth of the Suzuki Corporation into a major manufacturer of small vehicles. During his initial two terms as President (1978 to 2000), Suzuki oversaw the company's achievement of a substantial market share in India. His strategy included identifying potential markets worldwide for affordable vehicles and utilizing diplomatic efforts to establish a presence through alliances.

Suzuki initiated overseas manufacturing in the late 1960s, beginning with the establishment of a facility in Thailand in 1967. Additional plants were subsequently opened in Indonesia in 1974 and the Philippines in 1975. By 1980, Suzuki had expanded manufacturing operations to Australia, followed by Pakistan in 1982. An alliance with General Motors facilitated Suzuki's entry into the European market. During the 1980s, Suzuki invested heavily in India, which became one of its major international markets.

In 1982, Suzuki and the Indian government formed a partnership, Maruti Udyog Limited. This venture shifted a market previously characterized by older, technologically outdated vehicles. Within ten years, the Maruti plant became a key Suzuki manufacturing center for the Indian subcontinent and East European, producing around 200,000 units a year. This investment in India contributed to the growth of the automotive manufacturing sector in the country.

Suzuki entered the New Zealand market in 1984 and, five years later, in 1989, expanded its reach to Canada while continuing in the markets of Nepal and Bangladesh through its Indian manufacturing unit, bringing total production to 10 million units. By 1993, Suzuki was responsible for 3 out of 4 cars sold in India and 2 out of 3 in Pakistan, selling more vehicles than any other Japanese manufacturer. The 1990s also saw Suzuki entering the Asian markets of Korea and Vietnam, as well as Egypt and Hungary.

Osamu Suzuki's strategic focus on overseas expansion contributed significantly to the company's growth. By the early 21st century, Suzuki operated 60 plants across 31 countries and had a sales presence in 190 countries. In 2003, the company reported a 33.7 percent increase in growth, with sales turnover reaching US$16.8157 billion. The following year, Suzuki became the largest small car manufacturer in Japan, with its two-wheeler division ranking third, behind Honda and Yamaha, and its outboard engine division making significant progress behind Honda and Yamaha, and its outboard engine division making significant progress.

Suzuki Corporation made a record profit of ¥ 107.5 billion and its shares rose 13 percent against the 3.5 percent decline experienced by the market.

In 2019, Osamu Suzuki oversaw the formation of a capital alliance with Toyota Motor Corp to collaborate on the development of self-driving vehicles.

== Legacy ==
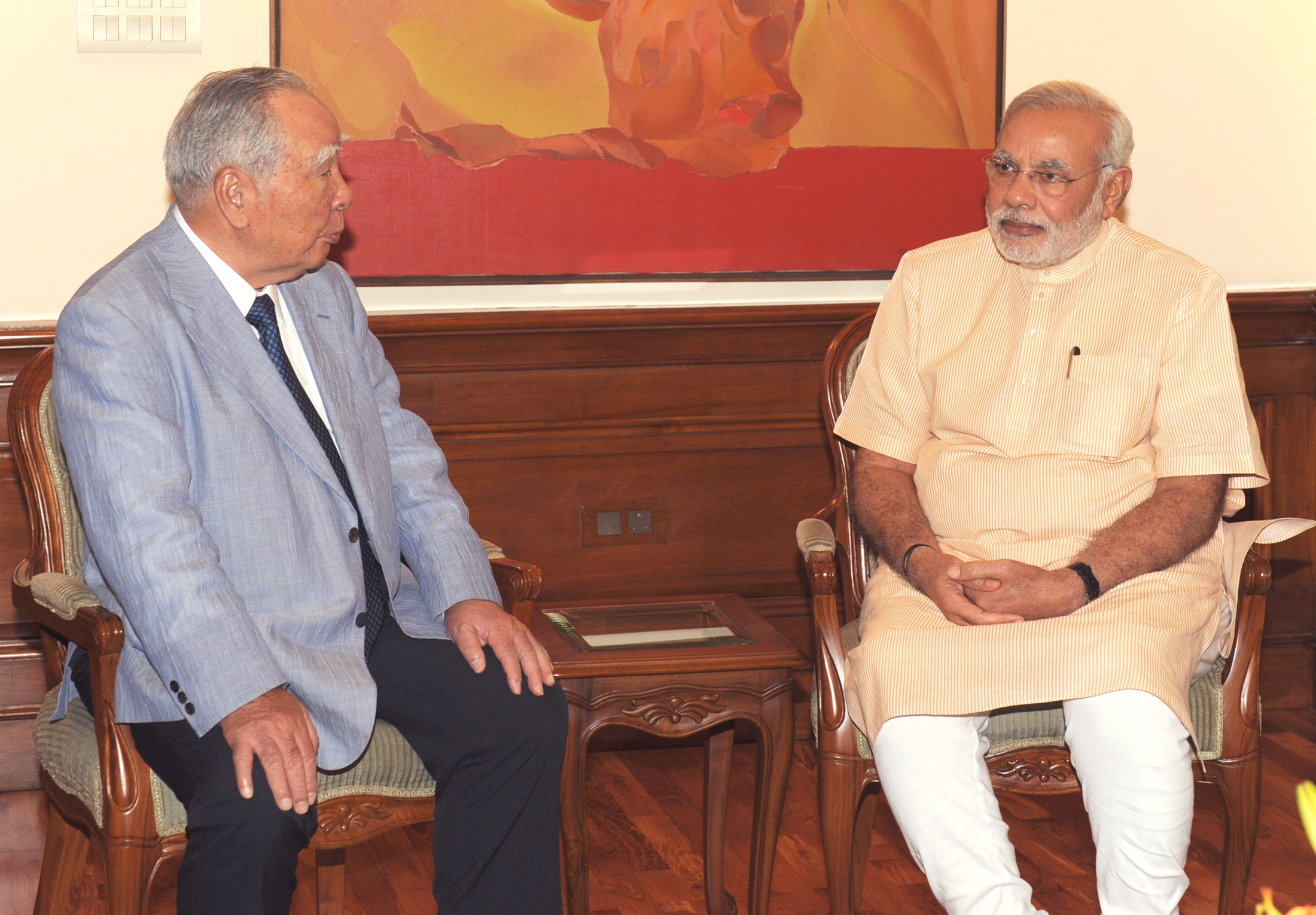
With Narendra Modi (in India on July 31, 2014)

Under Osamu Suzuki's leadership as CEO, Suzuki Corporation expanded into a global conglomerate. He extended Suzuki's presence to 190 countries. Instead of competing with the other leading global automative manufacturers that were focusing on cutting-edge technology, he focused on emerging markets with small, modern cars which influenced automobile trends in the countries where Suzuki expanded. In India, for example, he introduced small modern cars at a time when the market was dominated by older models, which contributed to significant changes in the auto industry.

Osamu Suzuki's fiscal prudence is often cited as a factor in Suzuki Motor Corporation's rise to prominence as an automotive company. Despite focusing on small, budget cars, Suzuki managed to maintain profitability.

== Awards and recognitions ==
- Padma Vibhushan – Government of India – 2025
- Padma Bhushan – Government of India – 2007
- Sitara-e-Pakistan – Government of Pakistan – 1984
- Commander's Cross Order of Merit - Republic of Hungary - 1993
- Commander's Cross with the Star Order of Merit – Republic of Hungary – 2004
- Grand Cross Order of Merit - Republic of Hungary - 2020
- The Order of the Rising Sun, Gold and Silver Star(2nd class) - Japan - 2000
- The Medal with Blue Ribbon - Japan - 1987
