= Saurabh Srivastava (entrepreneur) =

Indian entrepreneur

- Born: Uttar Pradesh, India
- Occupations: Entrepreneur; Investment professional
- Years active: Since 1988
- Known for: Entrepreneurship; Angel investment
- Awards: Padma Shri; Dataquest Lifetime Achievement Award; IITK Distinguished Alumnus Award; PM's IT Industry Award

Saurabh Srivastava is an Indian entrepreneur, investment professional, institution builder and a former chairman of NASSCOM, a non-profit trade organization for the promotion of Indian IT industry. A master's degree holder from Harvard University, he founded Infinity Venture, reportedly the first venture capital fund in India and is a recipient of Dataquest Lifetime Achievement Award, the IT Industry Award from the Prime Minister of India and Distinguished Alumnus Award from the Indian Institute of Technology, Kanpur. The Government of India awarded him the fourth highest civilian honour of the Padma Shri, in 2016, for his contributions to trade and industry.

== Biography ==
Saurabh Srivastava, after graduating in engineering from the Indian Institute of Technology, Kanpur, continued to his studies at Harvard University and secured a master's degree in science from the university. He started his career with IBM in the US and later worked at Tata Unisys in India before embarking on his entrepreneurial career. In 1989, he founded IIS Infotech Limited, an IT company and served as its chairman till 2001, oversaw its merger with Xansa, the British BPO, in 2000 and served as the executive chairman of Xansa India till 2006. He was one among the group of IT entrepreneurs who founded the National Association of Software Services Companies (later renamed as NASSCOM) in 1988 and served as its chairman from 1997 to 1999 after which he holds the position of the Chairman Emeritus. Infinity Venture, a venture capital founded by him in 1999, was reportedly the first such initiative in India and he has been serving as its chairman since inception. TiE New Delhi NCR, a non profit community promoting entrepreneurship, is one another institution founded by him and he has served as its chairman; he continues his association with the institution as its Chairman Emeritus and a board member.

Srivastava is the chairman Spice Digital, and has also chaired such associations as Electronics and Computer Software Promotion Council (ESC), Indian Venture Capital Association, Indian Private Equity and Venture Capital Association and the Indus Entrepreneurs. He is one of the founders and an individual member of the Indian Angel Network, the largest angel investor forum in India and one of the largest in the world. He sits in the advisory boards of Imperial College Business School, two Indian Institutes of Technology at Delhi and Kanpur and two universities, Uttarakhand Technical University and Himachal Pradesh University. He also serves as an adjunct professor of entrepreneurship at the Indian Institute of Technology, Mumbai.

== Awards and honors ==
Dataquest, the Indian magazine for IT industry, chose him for their 2014 Lifetime Achievement Award in 2015. He has received a doctorate (honoris causa) from the University of Wolverhampton and is a recipient of the IT Excellence Award of the Prime Minister of India. The Government of India awarded him the civilian honor of the Padma Shri in 2016. He is also a recipient of the Distinguished Alumnus Award of the Indian Institute of Technology, Kanpur.

== See also ==
- Angel investor
- Venture capital
