= National Pharmaceutical Pricing Authority =

Government-run regulatory body in India

Agency overview
- Formed: 29 August 1997
- Jurisdiction: India
- Headquarters: 3rd/5th Floor, YMCA Cultural Center Building 1, Jai Singh Road, New Delhi, India
- Agency executive: P. Krishnamurthy IAS, Chairman/Chairperson
- Parent department: Department of Pharmaceuticals, Ministry of Chemicals and Fertilizers
- Website: nppa.gov.in

The National Pharmaceutical Pricing Authority (NPPA) is a government regulatory agency that controls the prices of pharmaceutical drugs in India. National Pharmaceutical Pricing Authority (NPPA) was constituted vide Government of India Resolution dated 29 August 1997 as an attached office of the Department of Pharmaceuticals (DoP), Ministry of Chemicals and Fertilizers as an independent Regulator for pricing of drugs and to ensure availability and accessibility of medicines at affordable prices.

== Drug Price Control Orders (DPCO) ==
The NPPA regularly publishes lists of medicines and their maximum selling prices. On 1 April 2022, NPPA increased prices of over 800 medicines under the National List of Essential Medicines (NELM) by over 10%. the price increased was based on the Wholesale Price Index (WPI) data provided by the office of the Economic Advisor, Ministry of Commerce and Industry, the annual change in WPI works out as 10.76607% during the calendar year 2021 over the corresponding period in 2020. The latest DPCO was released in 2013 and has a list of 384 drugs. On 4 December 2017, it was announced that a multi-disciplinary committee of experts for consultation on matters about the implementation of the Drug Price Control Order (DPCO) including technicalities involved in pricing and new launches will be set up and it will have a member secretary of the National Pharmaceutical Pricing Authority (NPPA) as its convener.

== Functions ==
- To implement and enforce the provisions of the Drugs (Prices Control) Order in accordance with the powers delegated to it.
- To deal with all legal matters arising out of the decisions of the Authority.
- To monitor the availability of drugs, identify shortages, if any, and take remedial steps.
- To collect/ maintain data on production, exports and imports, market share of individual companies, the profitability of companies etc, for bulk drugs and formulations.
- To undertake and/ or sponsor relevant studies in respect of the pricing of drugs/ pharmaceuticals.
- To recruit/ appoint the officers and other staff members of the Authority, as per rules and procedures laid down by the Government.
- To render advice to the Central Government on changes/ revisions in drug policy.
- To help the Central Government in parliamentary matters relating to the drug pricing.

== Initiatives ==
=== Price monitoring and resource unit (PMRU) ===
Under its program called "Consumer awareness, publicity and price monitoring (CAPPMS)" the NPPA has set up 12 Price monitoring and resource units in various States and UTs.It has planned to set up such units in all 36 states and UTs for better outreach of NPPA in the states as these units will help the NPPA and State drug controller to ensure the accessibility of drugs at affordable prices. The PMRUs are societies registered under The Societies Registration Act, 1860 under the direct supervision of The State Drug Controller with its "board of governors" containing nominees of state and central government apart from other stakeholders. They will be funded by NPPA for their recurring and non-recurring expenses.
