= Areez Khambatta =

Indian businessman (1937–2022)

- Born: September 22, 1937
- Died: November 19, 2022 (aged 85); Ahmedabad
- Education: Gujarat College
- Awards: Padma Shri

Areez Pirojshaw Khambatta (22 September 1937 - 19 November 2022) was an Indian businessman and the founder of Rasna, a soft-drink concentrate company. He was posthumously awarded the Padma Shri in 2023.

== Early life and education ==
He graduated from the Gujarat College in 1959 with a degree in chemistry.

== Career ==
Areez joined his father's business in 1962. He created the soft drink concentrate brand Jaffe, named for Jaffna mangoes in the 1976. Jaffe was named Rasna in 1980. In 1997, his son Piruz took over the company.

== Other work ==
He was also the Chairman of Areez Khambatta Benevolent Trust and Rasna Foundation.

He was vice president of the Federation of Parsi Zoroastrian Anjuman of India.

== Personal life ==
He was married to Persis Khambatta, and had three children - Piruz, Delna, and Ruzan.
