= Moser Baer =

Indian multinational technology company

- Type: Public
- Traded as: BSE: 517140; NSE: MOSERBAER
- ISIN: INE739A01015
- Industry: Optical storage media, Solid state media (Flash based memory), Content Replication, Photovoltaic cell and module manufacturing, EPC for solar farms, Home entertainment
- Founded: 1983; 43 years ago New Delhi, India
- Defunct: September 20, 2018; 8 years ago
- Fate: Bankruptcy; assets liquidated; brand acquired by Vinpower, Inc.
- Headquarters: New Delhi, India
- Key people: Deepak Puri, Founder & CMD
- Products: DVD +/- R : dual and single layer, CD-R, Mini CDR and DVDR, Platinum DVDR/CDR, Inkjet Printable DVDR/ CDR, Rewritable Discs (RW), Light scribe Discs, Blu-ray Discs, Perfumed DVDRs, USB Drives, Flash cards, PV cells, PV modules, Movies on VCDs, Movies on DVDs, Movies on Blu-ray Discs
- Owner: Vinpower, Inc.
- Website: www.moserbaer.com

Moser Baer was an Indian multinational manufacturer of optical discs, storage devices, CDs, and DVDs, based in New Delhi. The company was present in over 100 countries, serviced through 15 marketing offices and representatives, and had tie-ups with other optical media storage manufacturers. Its products were manufactured at its three plants in New Delhi, which employed over 8,000 people. The company had subsidiaries that manufactured photovoltaic cells and modules using crystalline silicon and thin film technologies.

== History ==
Moser Baer India was founded in New Delhi in 1983 as a Time Recorder unit in technical collaboration with Maruzen Corporation (ja), Japan and Moser Baer Sumiswald (de), Switzerland. In 1988, it moved into the data storage industry, manufacturing 5.25-inch floppy diskettes. 1993, it started manufacturing 3.5-inch floppy diskettes (MFD).

In 1999, it set up a high-capacity plant to manufacture recordable Compact Disks (CD-Rs) and recordable Digital Versatile Disks (DVD-Rs). At the time, the company was the only large Indian manufacturer of magnetic and optical media data storage products, exporting around 85 percent of its production.

In 2006, the company expanded into the Photovoltaic cells and Home entertainment industries.

In 2016, NAND flash device controller supplier Phison Electronics partnered with Moser Baer and Sahasra Electronics, India's two largest electronics manufacturers, to expand its business in India, according to Phison chairman Khein Seng Pua.

The company was ordered liquidated due to its bankruptcy on 20 September 2018.

A forensic audit of the company's finances found several irregularities in Moser Baer's accounts on 26 September 2018.

The Central Bank of India declared Moser Baer's accounts as fraudulent on 20 April 2019.

The Central Bank of India filed a first information report against Moser Baer on 16 August 2019.

The Enforcement Directorate arrested Ratul Puri, a former executive director of Moser Baer and son of Deepak Puri, for a ₹354 crore bank fraud case on 20 August 2019. Ratul Puri, Deepak Puri, and several other directors have been charged with criminal conspiracy, cheating, forgery, and corruption.

Seeing a void in the tangible digital storage market, Vinpower, Inc. (dba Vinpower Digital), assumed the role by acquiring the rights to Moser Baer and introducing a new line of digital storage products under the Moser Baer brand. These products are focused on optical discs and flash media, continuing the Moser Baer MID and mix of professional and consumer grade storage products.

== Timeline ==
- 1983-Year of Incorporation
- 1985-Production of 8.0"/5.25" disks
- 1987-Production of 3.5" disks
- 1998-ISO 9002 certification
- 1999-Production of CD-Rs
- 2000-Production of CD-RWs
- 2002-Completely Integrated Manufacturing
- 2003-Production of DVD-R and DVD-RW, ISO Certification for all Facilities, launch of 'Moser Baer' Brand in Indian Market, signed one of Largest Outsourcing Deals in Indian manufacturing
- 2004-'Lightscribe' Deal with HP, HP Deal for India and SAARC Region, contributing member of Blu-ray Disk Association
- 2005-ISO 14001 & OHSAS 18001 certification for Moser Baer plants, commencement of Phase III of Greater Noida Plant, announced Moser Baer Photovoltaic Ltd as its wholly owned subsidiary, received status of SEZ developer from Govt. of India, announced a wholly owned subsidiary-Moser Baer SEZ, signed MoU with IIT, Delhi
- 2006-The first company in the world to start volume shipments of HD DVD-R, signed Technology MoU with IT BHU, patented technology approved by the Blu-ray Disc Association, in-house R&D Centre approved by Ministry of Science and Technology, launched USB Flash drives, forayed into entertainment space, enters Home Video market
- 2007-Acquired OM&T BV - a Philips' optical technology and R&D subsidiary, announced start of trial run of solar photovoltaic cell production facility, set up the world's largest Thin Film Solar Fab, launched US$150 mn FCCBs, Moser Baer Photo Voltaic announced commercial shipment of solar photovoltaic cells, Moser Baer Photo Voltaic announced US$880 million strategic sourcing tie-up with REC Group
- 2008-Moser Baer plans 600 MW Thin Film PV capacity with an estimated investment of over $1.5 bn, Moser Baer Photo Voltaic announces strategic sourcing tie-up with LDK Solar, announcement of successful trials of first Gen 8.5 Thin Film plant, Moser Baer gets the coveted Blu-ray product verification, Moser Baer signs exclusive home video licensing deal with UTV Motion Pictures, Moser Baer launches a digital video processing facility in Chennai, Moser Baer secures customer sales orders of $500 million for solar modules, Global investors inject Rs. 411 crore into Moser Baer's solar photovoltaic business, Moser Baer announces successful trials of first Gen 8.5 Thin Film plant, Moser Baer Photo Voltaic announces strategic sourcing tie-up with LDK Solar, Moser Baer plans 600 MW Thin Film PV capacity with an estimated investment of over $1.5 bn
- 2009-Moser Baer’s thin film solar modules are now IEC certified, Moser Baer to set up one of India’s largest rooftop solar PV installations in Surat, thin film line ready for production of ultra-large solar modules
- 2010-Moser Baer is among the few players to achieve world's highest single junction Thin Film module efficiency of 7.3% through its proprietary process, increasing the module wattage from 340 watt/panel to 400 watt/panel, Moser Baer launches micro SD Cards and content loaded drives, launch of e-commerce website offering Moser Baer products, joins hands with leading entertainment players to form an Anti-Piracy Coalition
- 2011-Commences production of YUKITA brand junction boxes in partnership with Yukita Electro for solar PV modules at its Plant in Greater Noida, sets up a PV reliability laboratory to study quality and reliability aspects of Crystalline Silicon and Thin Film PV modules, emerges as the first Indian Solar PV company to achieve installation of 100 MW under its own brand, commissioning of Moser Baer India's first 5MW Thin Film solar farm in Tamil Nadu, awarded a grant by MNER towards development of innovative CIGS solar cell technology, launches 'world's slimmest' USB flash Drive, Moser Baer Technologies and Universal Display Corporation announced technology and licensing agreement for energy efficient white OLED lighting, Moser Baer signs a MoU with C-MET Pune for R&D on "Hybrid Solar Cells based on Organic Polymers and Inorganic Nano particles"]
- In 2016, NAND flash device controller supplier Phison Electronics is partnering with Moser Baer and Sahasra Electronics, India's two largest electronics manufacturers, to expand its business in India, according to Phison chairman Khein Seng Pua.
- 2018-Liquidation due to insolvency.
- 2020- Vinpower, Inc., acquired and took over full production of the most common slate of Moser Baer media commodities, primarily optical discs and flash media.

Certifications & Recognition

- Recipient of "Best of all" Rajiv Gandhi National Quality Award in 2005
