= Rajni Bector =

Indian businesswoman

- Occupation: industrialist
- Known for: Mrs. Bectors Food
- Awards: Padma Shri

Rajni Bector is an Indian industrialist who founded Mrs. Bectors Food Specialities and Cremica Group of Companies. She was awarded India's fourth-highest civilian award, the Padma Shri, in 2021.
