= Kapil Mohan =

Indian entrepreneur (1929–2018)

- Born: 16 July 1929; India
- Died: 6 January 2018 (aged 88); Narinder Mohan Hospital, Mohan Nagar, Ghaziabad
- Occupation: Entrepreneur
- Known for: Old Monk Rum, Solan No.1, and Golden Eagle
- Spouse: Pushpa Mohan
- Children: 1
- Awards: Padma Shri; Vishisht Seva Medal

Kapil Mohan was an Indian entrepreneur and the chairman and managing director of Mohan Meakin, a brewer and distiller based in Ghaziabad. He was a recipient of the Vishisht Seva Medal and had served as a brigadier until the time of his retirement from the Indian Armed Forces.

== Education and work ==
Holder of a doctoral degree (PhD) and a former managing director of Trade Links Private Limited (1956-1966), Mohan was also a director of other group companies such as Arthos Breweries Limited, Mohan Rocky Springwater Breweries Limited, Sagar Sugars and Allied Products Limited, R. R. B. Energy Limited and Solchrome Systems India Limited. He was also the patron of General Mohyal Brahman Sabha, an organisation of the Brahman community of Punjab.

== Personal life ==
Mohan was married to Pushpa Mohan. Mohan was unwell over the last few years of his life, and had handed over day-to-day functioning of the various companies to his nephews, Hemant and Vinay Mohan.

== Awards ==
He was honoured by the Government of India, in 2010, with the fourth-highest Indian civilian award of Padma Shri.

== Death ==
He died due to cardiac arrest on 6 January 2018.
