= Vibha =

Vibha /ˈviːbə/ is an Indian feminine given name. The Sanskrit word vibhā has the meaning of "shining, bright".

== See also ==
- , for a list of people with the name
