= Rajshree Pathy =

Indian businesswoman

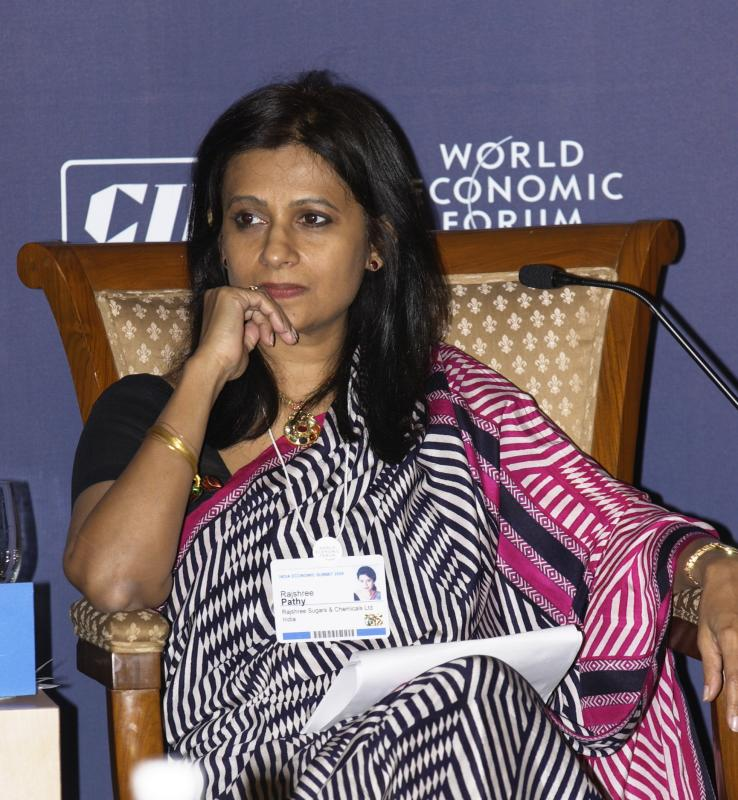
- Born: 15 April 1956 (age 69); Coimbatore, Tamil Nadu
- Occupation(s): Chairman and managing director, Rajshree Sugars and Chemicals, India Design Forum
- Spouse: S. Pathy
- Children: 2
- Awards: Padma Shri (2013)

Rajshree Pathy (born 15 April 1956) is an Indian entrepreneur from Coimbatore, Tamil Nadu. She is the chairperson and managing director of the Rajshree Group of Companies and founder of India Design Forum. The Rajshree Group has varied business interests, including food and agriculture, energy, travel, health, hospitality and the arts. Pathy also promotes performing arts and contemporary art movement in Coimbatore through the Contemplate Art Gallery and COCCA.

== Early life ==
Rajshree Pathy is the daughter of famous industrialist G. Varadaraj, of the PSG family, who are Telugus. She is married to S. Pathy, chairman and managing director of Lakshmi Mills.

== Professional career ==
Rajshree Sugars and Chemicals Ltd. is a company with interests across integrated fields such as sugar, distillery, power generation and biotechnology. It was founded by her father G. Varadaraj. Rajshree range of products includes white sugar, alcohol, organic manure, bio-products and power.

== Awards and recognition ==
- Global Leaders of Tomorrow (1996), World Economic Forum
- Eisenhower Exchange Fellowship (2000)
- Padma Shri (2013), Government of India
