= Dataquest =

Indian magazine focused on information technology

- Owner: Cyber Media India Limited
- Publisher: Pradeep Gupta
- Editor: Ibrahim Ahmad
- Associate editor: Shrikanth Govindarajan
- Founded: 1982
- Headquarters: New Delhi, India
- Website: www.dqindia.com

Dataquest is an Indian magazine focused on information technology related articles. The magazine is published monthly by Cyber Media India Ltd, South Asia's largest specialty media group. It was one of the first publications to champion energy/green issues and the application of IT in governance.

== History and profile ==
Dataquest Magazine started as an industry publication in 1982 to address the information needs of the then nascent IT industry in India. In the 1990s, it strengthened that position while broadening its coverage to include technology policies, markets and resellers. Between 2008 and 2011, the magazine transformed itself to a complete publication on IT targeting the enterprise IT users such as CIOs and IT managers. That is also the period when the magazine saw significant research-based content.

The magazine runs two special sections on these two areas: Green IT and eGovernance.
