= Chopra (surname) =

- Jāti: Khatri
- Religions: Hinduism, Sikhism
- Languages: Punjabi
- Country: India
- Region: Punjab, Haryana
- Heraldic title: Singh, Sardar, Rao

Chopra (IPA: [tʃoːpɽaː]) is a surname of the Khatri community mainly based in Haryana and Indian Punjab. Chopra Khatris belonged to the Bahri family-group, which also includes the subclans Dhawan, Kakkar, Kapoor, Khanna, Mehra, Malhotra, Sehgal, Seth, Tandon, Talwar, and Vohra.

The surname is also found among the Ramgarhia Sikhs and the Rors.

== Origin ==
The Chopras claims to originate from one man called "Chaupat Rai" who was killed in a battle with Sultan Mahmud of Ghazni. His descendants who were born before his death took the name of their forefather and hence came to be known as Chopra. Most Chopras are Hindu, with a minority also being Sikh.

== History ==
Todar Mal was Chopra. Diwan Mulraj and Diwan Sawan Mal were from Chopra Khatri families and served as army generals under Maharaja Ranjit Singh of the Sikh Empire. Sawan Mal Chopra was renowned for capturing Multan from the rule of Afghans, while Mulraj was known to have rebelled against the British which led to the 2nd Anglo-Sikh war. The ancestors of the Chopras were expert gamblers, so much so that they were called the incarnation of Maharaja Nala.

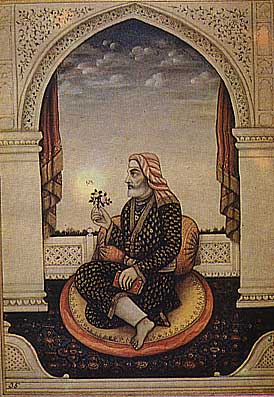
Diwan Sawan Mal Chopra, governor of Lahore and Multan

They were concentrated in the Majha region of Punjab in the modern-day countries of India and Pakistan which includes Gujranwala, Amritsar, Lahore etc. Dr. Satyapal, a prominent freedom fighter from Gujranwala who was arrested by the British along with Saifuddin Kitchlew was a Chopra Khatri. Kavi Tahikan was a soldier by profession who also served as one of the 52 poets/writers of Guru Gobind Singh. He belonged to a Chopra family from Jalalpur town of Gujrat district.

== Notable people ==
People listed may or may not be affiliated to the clans or the religions, include:

=== Athletes ===
- Aakash Chopra (born 1977), Indian cricketer who played for the Indian cricket team from late 2003 until late 2004
- Agni Chopra (born 1998), Indian cricketer
- Ajmer Singh Chopra (born 1953), Indian Olympic basketball player
- Anjum Chopra (born 1977), former captain of India national women's cricket team
- Aryan Chopra (born 2001), Indian chess prodigy who became a grandmaster in 2016, at the age of 14
- Daniel Chopra (born 1973), Swedish professional golfer with highest International ranking of 60
- Keshav Chopra (born 2001), American tennis player who won the IMG Academy 2019 Student Male Athlete of the Year Award
- Michael Chopra (born 1983), English footballer who played for Sunderland FC, Cardiff City & Ipswich Town
- Nikhil Chopra (born 1973), Indian cricketer and cricket analyst
- Neeraj Chopra (born 1997), Indian Olympic javelin thrower
- Pranav Chopra (born 1992), Indian badminton player with highest international ranking in Mixed Doubles being 13
- Prashant Chopra (born 1992), Indian cricketer
- Rahul Chopra (born 1994), Emirati cricketer
- Rajneesh Chopra (born 1974), Indian cricketer
- Rishi Chopra (born 1995), Irish cricketer
- Somnath Chopra (1915–1988), Indian hammer throw athlete
- Varun Chopra (born 1987), English cricketer, captained the English U-19 cricket team
- Varun Chopra (born 2000), Irish cricketer
- Vijay Chopra (born 1948), Indian cricketer

=== Authors ===
- Ashok Chopra (born 1949), Indian author
- Chandmal Chopra, Indian author
- Deepak Chopra (born 1946), Indian medical doctor, public speaker, and writer on subjects such as spirituality and Ayurveda
- Gotham Chopra (born 1975), American author and entertainment/media entrepreneur
- Mohan Chopra (1921–1969), Indian Hindi intellectual and author
- Mallika Chopra (born 1972), Indian American author and businesswoman
- Pushpinder Singh Chopra (1943–2021), Indian military historian and the author of several books, chiefly on military aviation
- Saloni Chopra, Indian-Australian actress, model and author
- Shaili Chopra (born 1981), Indian business journalist, author and entrepreneur, founder of SheThePeople
- Zuni Chopra, Indian author best known for her novel The House That Spoke

=== Directors ===
- Aditya Chopra (born 1971), Indian film producer, screenwriter and director
- Baldev Raj Chopra (1914–2008), Indian director and producer of Bollywood movies and television serials
- Jagmohan Chopra (1935–2013), Indian printmaker, painter and photographer who promoted printmaking in India
- Jaideep Chopra (born 1971), Indian film director, producer and writer
- Joyce Chopra (born 1936), American director and writer of feature films and television
- Pamela Chopra (1948–2023), Indian film producer, playback singer and writer
- Ramanand Sagar (1917–2005), birth name Chandramauli Chopra, Indian filmmaker
- Ravi Chopra (born 1946), Indian movie producer and director
- Tanuj Chopra, American filmmaker
- Vidhu Vinod Chopra (born 1952), Indian director and producer
- Vikram Chopra, Indian film director, screenwriter, and actor
- Yash Chopra (1932–2012), Indian filmmaker, film director, screenwriter, and Bollywood producer

=== Executives ===
- Amarjit Chopra, Indian chartered accountant who served as the president of Institute of Chartered Accountants of India (ICAI)
- Aneesh Chopra (born 1972), the first Federal Chief Technology Officer of the United States (CTO)
- Rohit Chopra (born 1982), American consumer advocate who is the 3rd director of the Consumer Financial Protection Bureau
- Sanjeev Chopra (born 1961), ex-Indian Civil Servant, former director at LBSNAA

=== Actors ===
- Akshat Chopra, Indian child film actor, model, dancer, anchor
- Deeya Chopra (born 1985), Indian television actor
- Gaurav Chopra (born 1979), Indian television and theatre actor
- Harshad Chopda (born 1983), Indian television actor
- Mannara Chopra (born 1991), Indian film actress who predominantly works in Telugu, Tamil, Hindi and Kannada films
- Meera Chopra (born 1983), Indian film actress who appears in Telugu and Tamil films
- Parineeti Chopra (born 1988), Indian actress
- Pawan Chopra, Indian actor
- Pransh Chopra (born 1984), Indian film actor who appears in Bollywood films
- Prem Chopra (born 1935), actor in Hindi and Punjabi films
- Priyanka Chopra (born 1982), Indian actress and former Miss World
- Roshni Chopra (born 1980), Indian actress, television presenter and the winner of NDTV Imagine's reality show, Dil Jeetegi Desi Girl
- Tisca Chopra (born 1973), Indian film actress, most known for her role in Taare Zameen Par (2007)
- Uday Chopra (born 1973), Bollywood actor, producer, and assistant director
- Ujjwal Chopra, Indian actor

=== Journalists ===
- Anupama Chopra (born 1967), Indian author, journalist and film critic
- Ashwini Kumar Chopra (1956–2020), Indian journalist and resident editor of the Punjab Kesari
- Lala Jagat Narain (1899–1981), Indian journalist
- Shaili Chopra (born 1981), Indian journalist, lead female anchor at ET Now, the Economic Times' business news channel
- Pran Chopra (1921–2013), Indian journalist, political analyst and newspaper editor
- Vijay Kumar Chopra (born 1932), Indian journalist, editor-in-chief of Punjab Kesari and the second son of Lala Jagat Narain

=== Models ===
- Gurleen Kaur Chopra, Indian model and actress
- Pooja Chopra (born 1986), Indian actress and model who won the title of Femina Miss India World 2009
- Sherlyn Chopra (born 1984), Indian model, singer, actress and model

=== Military officers ===
- Anil Chopra (air marshal), Air Marshal in Indian Air Force
- Anil Chopra (admiral), Vice Admiral in Indian Navy
- Mohindar Singh Chopra (1907–1990), Indian army officer and ambassador

=== Politicians ===
- Subhash Chopra (born 1947), Indian politician from Delhi
- Suneet Chopra (1941–2023), Indian politician and trade unionist

=== Scientists and academics ===
- Anil K. Chopra (born 1941), Indian-American civil engineer and professor
- Bashambhar Nath Chopra (1898–1966), Indian zoologist
- G. P. Chopra (1920–2011), Indian educationist, credited with the establishment of several educational institutions in India
- Jagjit Singh Chopra (1935–2019), Indian neurologist, medical writer and an Emeritus Professor at PGIMER
- Kasturi Lal Chopra (1933–2021), Indian materials physicist and a former director of the IIT Kharagpur
- Ram Nath Chopra (1882–1973), Indian Medical Service officer, considered the "Father of Indian Pharmacology" for his work on pharmaceuticals
- Renu Khanna Chopra (born 1949), Indian scientist
- Sanjiv Chopra (born 1949), American medical academic, Professor of Medicine and Faculty Dean for Continuing Medical Education at Harvard Medical School
- Shiv Chopra (1933–2018), Canadian microbiologist and human rights activist
- Virender Lal Chopra (1936–2020), Indian biotechnologist and director-general of the Indian Council of Agricultural Research with contributions in improving the wheat production of India
- Vineet Chopra, Indian–American medical doctor, chair of the Department of Medicine at the University of Colorado School of Medicine

=== Others ===
- Aisha Ali Chopra (born 1989), Indian singer, songwriter and contemporary dancer
