= Talwar (surname) =

Indian surname

Talwar (IPA: [t̪əlʋaːɾ]) is an Indian surname originating in the Khatri and Sikh communities of Punjab. It is derived from the word "talvar" meaning sword. Talwar is a Khatri clan traditionally associated with the Punjab region. Historical records classify the Talwar as a Khatri section and document the presence of Talwar families in areas of the former Punjab Province and the North-West Frontier Province, including the Peshawar District and Mardan District regions.

The A Glossary of the Tribes and Castes of the Punjab and North-West Frontier Province, compiled by H. A. Rose, lists Talwar among the Khatri sections. The Talwar are also recorded as a Khatri group in the Census of India records of the colonial and post-colonial period.

Historical sources also document Talwar families in the Mardan area of the former North-West Frontier Province. The area around Hoti-Mardan was historically part of the Peshawar region and is now located in Khyber Pakhtunkhwa, Pakistan.

== Notable people ==
- Aakash Talwar (born 1992), Indian actor
- Aarushi Talwar (died 2008), Indian teenage murder victim
- Amar Talwar (born 1949), Indian actor
- Bhagat Ram Talwar (1909–1983), Indian spy, revolutionary and independence activist
- Bhavna Talwar, Indian journalist and film director
- Ganga Sagar Talwar, known by his nom de plume Sagar Sarhadi (1933–2021), Indian fictional and film writer
- Gursaran Talwar (born 1926), Indian medical researcher and innovator
- Hari Kishan Talwar (1908–1931), Indian independence activist
- Isha Talwar (born 1987), Indian actress
- Janak Raj Talwar (1931–2002), Indian cardiovascular surgeon
- K. K. Talwar (born 1946), Indian cardiologist, medical researcher and writer
- Lala Ram Saran Das Talwar (1888–1963), Indian revolutionary and politician
- Mangla Devi Talwar, Indian politician
- Man Mohan Bir Singh Talwar (1931–2018), Indian fighter pilot
- Puneet Talwar (born 1965), American diplomat
- Ramesh Talwar (born 1944), Indian-American film director, producer and actor
- Raj Kumar Talwar (1922–2002), Indian banker
- Rajesh Talwar, Indian writer and lawyer
- Rohit Talwar (1965–2014), Indian cricketer
- Saanvi Talwar, Indian actress
- Sanjeev Talwar (born 1972), Indian politician
- Sarkar Talwar (born 1952), Indian cricketer
- Vaibhav Talwar (born 1981), Indian model and actor
- Veena Talwar Oldenburg, American historian and professor
- Vikram Talwar, Indian-American businessperson
