= Kakkar =

Indian Khatri surname

Kakkar or Kakar (IPA: [kəkːəɽ]) is an Indian surname originating with the founder of a Bahri clan. It is associated with the Khatri caste of Hindus, Sikhs and Muslims. Whilst the Dictionary of American Family Names states the etymology derives from the Sanskrit word karalagni, used in reference to the Sun and translating as "one who holds fire in its hands", historians R. C. Dogra and Baij Nath Puri, believe it is derived from the word Karkar, meaning strong or powerful.

== Notable people ==
Notable people bearing the name Kakkar, who may or may not be associated with the Khatri caste, include:

- Ajay Kakkar, Baron Kakkar (born 1964), British surgeon
- Akriti Kakar (born 1986), Indian singer
- Dipika Kakar (Born 1986), Indian Television Actress
- Loveleen Kacker, Indian bureaucrat and executive
- Neha Kakkar (born 1988), Indian playback singer
- Nina Kakkar (born 1955), Indian businesswoman
- Nitin Kakkar, Indian director
- Prahlad Kakkar (born 1950), Indian ad film director and media personality
- Prakriti Kakar (born 1995), Indian playback singer
- Rajeev Kakar, Indian banker and serial entrepreneur
- Santosh Kumar Kacker, Indian doctor and medical researcher
- Shyam Nath Kacker, Indian politician and lawyer
- Sonu Kakkar (born 1986), Indian playback singer
- Subbiraj Kakkar (died 2007), Indian actor
- Sudhir Kakar (born 1938), Indian Psychoanalyst, novelist and author
- Sukriti Kakar (born 1995), Indian singer
- Tony Kakkar (born 1984), Indian playback singer
- Vinit Kakar, Indian actor

== See also ==
- Kakkar Subdistrict
- Kakar
- Kekkar
