= Finish the Story =

UK Band

Finish the Story was a band formed in Evesham, England in 1981. The original members were Nicola Mumford, Garry Smout and Peter Bright. The band was part of the 'Evesham Scene' which included bands The Photos and The Dancing Did.

== History ==
The band formed as a cathartic reaction to the death of Nicola's boyfriend, Stuart Dyke, who was killed in a car crash in 1981. Stuart was the bass player with The Dancing Did. Tim Harrison, the singer with The Dancing Did, invited Nicola to put her angst into words and music and support his band at their next gig. With only a handful of songs and a home-made video, the much under-rehearsed Finish the Story appeared for a one-off gig at The Phoenix Club in Great Malvern as the support act for The Dancing Did.

In the audience was freelance journalist Mick Mercer, who was there to review the main act for Record Mirror. A review of the same gig appeared in ZigZag written by Sara Jones, who said,

"Finish the Story's debut gig was better than the second coming of Jesus Christ."

With only a few gigs to their credit, the band headlined in towns and cities like London, Birmingham, Bristol, and Exeter. Also they supported The Cure at Hammersmith Odeon. Other bands they have appeared with include Blurt, And Also The Trees. Finish the Story refused to compromise their artistic intensity to a record label which ultimately forced them apart.

Their first release was on Gunfire and Pianos (SITU 17), released by ZigZag/Situation Two. Also appearing on this album were Psychic TV, Jazz Butcher and All About Eve.

== Articles ==
- Clipping of 'one-off' Malvern gig in Record Mirror 8 August 1981 by Mick Mercer
- ZigZag clipping of 'one-off' Malvern gig September 1981 by Sara Jones
- Review of gig in Bristol by Dave Massey in Sounds 2 July 1983
- Interview in 'Women in Rock' published by The Daily Mirror 1983
- Review and interview with the BBC in 2005. There is a link on this page to an audio clip of the interview.
- Collection of a few reviews and quotes.
