= Anil Chopra =

Anil Chopra may refer to:

- Anil Chopra (air marshal), Indian Air Force officer
- Anil Chopra (admiral), Indian Navy officer
- Anil K. Chopra, American earthquake engineer
