= The Dancing Did =

UK musical group

- Origin: Evesham, Worcestershire, England
- Genres: Folk punk
- Years active: 1979–1983
- Labels: Fruit & Veg, Stiff, Kamera, Cherry Red
- Past members: Tim Harrison; Martin Dormer; Roger Smith; Chris Houghton; Peter Barry Mike Davies

The Dancing Did were a British post-punk/folk punk group formed in Evesham in 1979, who were described as "a cross between the Clash and Steeleye Span". They released an album in 1982 and split up the following year.

== History ==
In 1979 vocalist Tim Harrison convinced school friend and active guitarist Martyn Dormer to join him on his musical quest. Tim's brother Ollie played drums with The Photos and was roped in for two DIY independent singles, with the eponymous single in 1979, and then in 1980 for "Squashed Things On The Road", both on their own Fruit & Veg label. Both singles were imported & distributed into the USA via Neil Kempfer-Stocker's Wired Muzik firm. The band's name derived from "didicoi", a term for Romani people.

Supporting The Photos that year at a local gig convinced Tim he wanted to do a lot more of it, while Martyn insisted they needed a band, and so recruited his drumming friend Chris Houghton. A capable local muso Mick Davies (aka Dick Crazies) joined on bass, soon replaced by Stuart Dyke, who only appears on a recording for a Chainsaw fanzine flexi-disc of "The Rhythm Section Sticks Together". Dyke was killed in a car crash in 1981 (which led to the formation of the band Finish the Story by his girlfriend Nicola), by which time the Dids were making quite a live reputation for themselves and getting a lot of positive press. NME's Barney Hoskyns wrote: "This excellent four-piece is playing a highly original, wait for it, pastoral Edwardian rockabilly, a delightfully rough, tough little sound whose untapped source is mythical village England, specifically in their case the county of Worcestershire... They are wholly wonderful."

Replacing Stuart was Roger Smith. They released a single, "The Lost Platoon" with Stiff Records in 1981, and then switched to Kamera Records in 1982 to release two singles, "Badger Boys" and "The Green Man And The March Of The Bungalows", and an album, And Did Those Feet.

The band split up in 1983.

Mick Mercer regards them as his "all-time favourite British group" and followed up with a book about the band.

== Post-band activity ==
Harrison became a magazine designer, working for Punch, Chat, and Q, and had no further musical activity.

Dormer joined the band's former roadie Bod in the burlesque rock 'n' roll outfit The Big Beat Band, performing around the Cotswolds at balls and country house parties. He went on to own a clothes shop before becoming a mobile phone salesman.

Roger Smith studied farming, and worked with Rhythm Oil, and then Underneath.

Martyn moved to the West Country where he was in a folk duo, Man Overboard, and currently plays with Skiffle Haze. He is also forming a duo with Bill Smarme, The Red Hot Lovers.

Drummer Chris Houghton did not play for a long while until joining covers band The Bassetts in the mid-1990s, which led to R&B specialists The Disciples, which in turn morphed into a pub/club/function band of the same name. After leaving the Disciples he returned to the blues/r&b vein as a founder member of Doctor's Orders in around 2005 whose tagline was 'good time blues blues with a twist of funk, rock, swing & jazz', while also playing with Big Cats, a female-fronted pop covers band. At around the same time he teamed up with 20-year-old songwriter/singer/guitarist Emma Howett to form (with others) Will Dance For Chocolate whose music was described by a local reviewer as 'unashamed bubblegum pop' and by Emma as 'Stalker Pop'. In 2011, he joined Huw James on Guitar & vocals and Julian Caddy on bass to form The John Steeds. Houghton also served for around 10 years as the house band drummer for the weekly jam night at The Marr's Bar in Worcester. In 2016, he retired, both from working and from drumming. In June 2016, he and Jude (his wife) sold their house and, after two years travelling around Spain, France, and Portugal in their caravan, they are now living in southern Spain.

== And Did Those Feet ==
And Did Those Feet

Studio album by The Dancing Did
- Released: November 1982
- Recorded: Millstream Studios, Cheltenham, England
- Genre: Post-punk
- Label: Kamera
- Producer: The Dancing Did

The band's only album, And Did Those Feet, was released in November 1982, through record label Kamera. It gave the band their only chart success, reaching number 25 in the UK Independent Chart. After being unavailable for many years, it was reissued in 2007 by Cherry Red, with bonus live tracks and B-sides. In 2011 the New Musical Express ranked And Did Those Feet at #44 on their list of "100 Greatest Albums You've Never Heard".

=== Track listing ===
All lyrics are written by Tim Harrison; all music is composed by Martyn Dormer.

No.	Title	Length
1.	"Wolves of Worcestershire"	5:15
2.	"The Rhythm Section Sticks Together"	1:47
3.	"On the Roofs"	3:39
4.	"Squashed Things"	3:47
5.	"The Headmaster and the Fly"	3:43
6.	"Ballad of a Dying Sigh"	4:39
7.	"Charnel Boy"	3:56
8.	"Badger Boys"	3:58
9.	"The Dancing Did"	3:39
10.	"Within The Green Green Avon O"	3:12

Bonus tracks
No.	Title	Length
11.	"Dancing Did (Single Version)"	3:12
12.	"Squashed Things on the Road (B-side to 'The Haunted Tea Rooms')"	3:10
13.	"The Green Man and the March of the Bungalows (7-Inch Single A-Side)"	3:50
14.	"A Fruit Picking Fantasy (The Day Bo Diddley nearly came to Evesham (B-Side to 'The Green Man...')"	2:51
15.	"The World's Gonna End in Cheltenham (B-Side to 'Badger Boys')"	3:26
16.	"Wolves of Worcestershire (Live at Cheltenham College 1981)"	4:16
17.	"Badger Boys (Live at Cheltenham College 1981)"	3:47
18.	"Charnel Boy (Live at Cheltenham College 1981)"	4:23
19.	"Green Man (Live at Cheltenham College 1981)"	2:59
20.	"Lost Platoon (Live at Cheltenham College 1981)"	2:59

=== Critical reception ===
Dave Thompson, reviewing the album for AllMusic, described "Wolves of Worcestershire" as "almost Shakespearean in its lyrical vision", and called "Squashed Things" "the sound of The Cure meets The Wurzels". Bill Prince (aka Bill Black), in Noise! magazine, writes, "the tunes... mix a healthy Tenpole Tudor thrash with the slick licks of the B52's", and the words are "a novel variation from the usual run of rock'n'roll lyrics." In The Rock Album Maxim Jakubowski characterised And Did Those Feet as "a quirky assemblage of experimental dance material" with "minimal instrumentation and heavily passionate vocals".

=== Personnel ===
- Roger Smith – bass guitar, production
- Chris Houghton – drums, production
- Martyn Dormer – vocals, lead guitar, synthesizer, production
- Tim Harrison – vocals, production

Technical

- Mick Dolan – engineering
- Porky – mastering

== Musical style ==
The band's music has been described as "rustic rock 'n' roll", resembling "a cross between the Clash and Steeleye Span". Writer Dave Thompson described the band: "punkabilly madmen who looked at the directions drawn by Dexys on the one hand, Tenpole Tudor on the other, and then drove a gap-toothed grinning juggernaut through the heart of all of them". Record Collector magazine, reviewing the reissued album described the band as "a theatrical, intellectual outfit with a driven sound somewhere between early Bunnymen and Southern Death Cult", calling them "a true English oddity". Paul Du Noyer, reviewing the 1982 single release "Badger Boys", describes the Did's musical approach as being like "A Clockwork Orange transposed... to the rural past." Many of the band's lyrics have countryside themes, covering topics such as fruit-picking but given a distinctive, humorous, sometimes surreal, twist. Maxim Jakubowski describes the band's subject matter as "most unusual", embracing bizarre and unlikely topics including ghosts, Vikings, dandified street gangs, burning witches, lost army platoons, wandering funerary spirits, feral wolves, nuclear war, haunted tea rooms, and even roadkill.

== Discography ==
=== Albums ===
- And Did Those Feet (1982), Kamera - reissued in 2007 by Cherry Red with several bonus tracks

=== Singles ===
- "Dancing Did" / "Lorry Pirates" (1979), Fruit & Veg
- "The Haunted Tearooms" / "Squashed Things on the Road" (1980), Fruit & Veg
- "The Lost Platoon" / "The Human Chicken" (1981), Stiff
- "The Green Man and the March of the Bungalows" / "A Fruit Picking Fantasy" (1982), Kamera
- "Badger Boys" / "The World's Gonna End in Cheltenham" (1982), Kamera
- "Six Word Hex" / "House on the Edge of the Wood" (1983), Kamera - withdrawn
