= Gone to Texas (disambiguation) =

Gone to Texas was a phrase in use during the 19th century in the southern United States.

It can also refer to :

- Gone to Texas (novel), a 1975 title by Forrest Carter
- Gone to Texas (film), a 1986 television movie
- Gone to Texas, a 2006 album by American band Jessica's Crime
