= Johnsons =

Johnsons may refer to:

- The Johnsons, a 1992 Dutch horror film
- The Johnsons, original bandname of UK punk band Pussycat and the Dirty Johnsons
- Johnsons, California, a settlement in California, US
- The Shane Twins, a professional wrestling tag team formerly known as The Johnsons

== See also ==
- Anohni and the Johnsons, an American music group
- Johnson, the surname
- Johnsons Coach & Bus Travel
