= Lady Godiva: Back in the Saddle =

2007 British comedy film

- Directed by: Baz Taylor
- Written by: Heath Jones
- Produced by: Heath Jones
- Starring: Faye Tozer; Tony Slattery; James Fleet; Phil Cornwell; Christine Hamilton; Neil Hamilton
- Cinematography: Ian Howes
- Edited by: Sanjeev Mirajkar
- Music by: Stephen Frost
- Production companies: Koralis Pictures; Quantum Films Ltd.; Lady Godiva Productions
- Release date: 12 November 2007
- Running time: 96 min
- Country: United Kingdom
- Language: English
- Budget: £2 million

Lady Godiva: Back in the Saddle is a 2007 British comedy film directed by Baz Taylor and starring James Fleet, Caroline Harker and Phil Cornwell. It follows a teacher who attempts to stop an American gangster and a corrupt mayor building a casino on the site where Lady Godiva once rode in Coventry.

== Cast ==
- Phil Cornwell as Mayor Osbourne
- James Fleet as Alan Jenkins
- Caroline Harker as Catherine Osbourne
- Nick Holder as Ray Carlton
- Matthew Ashforde as Vincent Dengler
- Zak Maguire as Andrew Osbourne
- Tony Slattery as Tom O'Driscoll
- Faye Tozer as Chantelle
- Mark Sutton as Carlton's heavy 1
- Dave Bishop as Carlton's heavy 2
- Joanna Croll as Jane Carmichael
- Emma Jesson as Serena Moss
- Roger Sloman as Frank Gilmont
- Mohan Chopra as Sanjeev
- Christine Hamilton as Christina Hampton
- Neil Hamilton as Henry Hampton
- Dominic Cazenove as Michael Davies
- Michael Fenton Stevens as Roger Tompkins

== Production ==
The project is fundraised by two Coventry businessmen, Heath Jones and Dennis Timothy, via their company Koralis Pictures, for 18 months as of May 2004. The company won funding from Enterprise Investment Scheme, but no financing support from the British film establishment. In Dec 2004, they ran into funding problem locally.

Because they were born and raised in Coventry, Mr. Jones said he hoped the film would do for Coventry what The Full Monty did for Sheffield. The film was originally expected to be directed by Mark L. Lester, but later changed to Baz Taylor who had worked on Auf Wiedersehen, Pet.

== Release ==
The film premiered in UK on 13 Nov 2007 and open to the public on 16 Nov.
