= SheThePeople =

Indian digital media website

- Website type: News
- Available in: English, Hindi
- Country of origin: India
- Founder: Shaili Chopra
- Website: www.shethepeople.tv
- Registration: Optional
- Launched: 2015; 11 years ago
- Current status: Active

SheThePeople.TV is an Indian digital media website that focuses on women related news and entertainment in video format, though "The Women's Channel" has a large amount of text based content as well. It was launched in 2015 by an Indian journalist, Shaili Chopra. Until 2016, SheThePeople.TV had written stories about over 10,000 women, and by 2019 the number of stories had crossed 50,000. It portrays itself as "India’s largest digital media platform for women stories". The name of the website, "she the people" is inspired by the first three words of the Indian constitution in the preamble "We the people".

In 2016 Anand Mahindra invested in SheThePeople.TV. In December 2016, they tied up with Viacom18's channel Colors. In collaboration with Facebook, SheThePeople conducts an Online Safety Summit. They also host other events such as a Women Writers' Fest and Digital Women Awards. The Women Writers' Fest started in 2016; by 2019 18 editions had been held in various locations.
