= Oliver Harrison =

English filmmaker

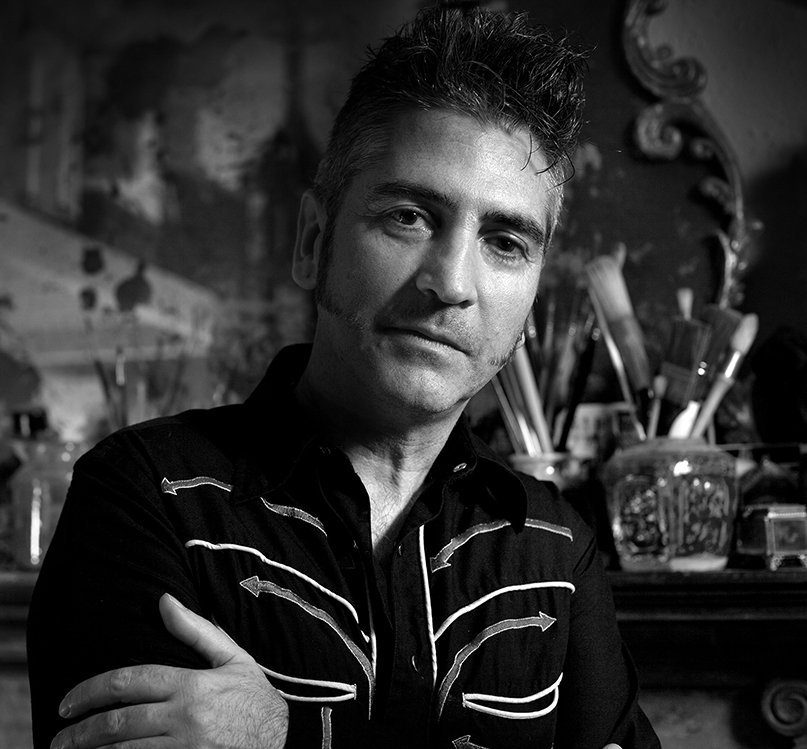
- Harrison in 2013
- Born: Stratford-upon-Avon, England
- Occupations: Filmmaker, artist, animator

Oliver Harrison is an English filmmaker, artist and animator. His films have been shown at film festivals around the world including Cannes Film Festival, New York Film Festival, San Francisco Film Festival and the London Film Festival. His feature film The Fallen Word premiered at the BFI Southbank in 2013. Influential in motion graphics, particularly in kinetic typography, Harrison's work has been featured at Tate Modern, The Barbican Centre and the Institute of Contemporary Arts.

== Film career ==
Following his graduation from St Martins School of Art in 1988, Harrison's student film Amore Baciami - set to a 50s Italian pop song sung by Nuccia Bongiovanni - received much critical acclaim. The film featured animated typography closely syncopated with the voice, a technique that would come to characterize Harrison's work; described as 'the beautiful precise and unparalleled marriage of sound and picture'. Harrison later said of Amore Baciami:

"I wanted the type to be the star, the letters: the heroes. This was not a film-title-sequence, type was not playing second-fiddle to live action, it was not a sequence in a pop promo, It was a new way of thinking about type and about graphics"

When David Puttnam introduced Amore Baciami on Thames TV's First Run he said of the film: 'I think it's quite brilliant'. Nominated for 'Best Animated Film' and 'Best Student Film' in the 1988 British Animation Awards, Amore Baciami was shown around the world in festivals including Hong Kong International Film Festival and the Spike and Mike's Festival of Animation in Los Angeles. Excerpts of the film were also shown on MTV's Liquid Television in the US.

Amore Baciami was bought by the advertising agency DMB&B. Part of the film was adapted for a long 90 second commercial called Letters of Love - a national campaign for The Royal Mail (Valentine's Day 1989). This cut down version of the film went on to win a Gold Lion at Cannes, a Gold Arrow at the British Television Advertising Awards, a D&AD Pencil and the Epica d'Or.

Following this success, Oliver was commissioned in 1992 to shoot the titles for Merchant Ivory's film Howards End which subsequently won a host of Oscars . The same year, Harrison signed up with Acme Filmworks in Hollywood and continued to make commercials throughout the 1990s, creating spots for Nike, Inc., Marie Claire, P&O Ferries, The Independent newspaper, Molson Beer, Toyota, IBD and MTV to name a few. Harrison's Toyota Rav 4 commercial, an experimental shoot combining motion control footage with live action, became 'Top spot of the Week' in Shoot magazine in 1996.

Despite his flourishing advertising career, Harrison was keen to continue making his own films. In a departure from his rostrum-based animation he chose to make his next film using a motion control rig. Spirit of Place (1992) was one the first films to take advantage of the relatively new technology, picking up an award at Cork Film Festival for its 35mm cinematography (D.O.P Doug Foster). Later - in 2015 - Spirit of Place featured in the Institute of Contemporary Arts' exhibition: Poetry FIlm Parallax curated by Zata Banks. In 2016 the exhibition was invited by the Bauhaus Film-Institut to play at the Backup Film Festival in Weimar.

Love is All (2000), a 'three-minute epic' notable for its use of multiple exposures, was shot on 35mm film using a 1917 Bell and Howell camera. The film was shown in over 70 festivals around the world and was selected for the Cannes Film Festival Director's Fortnight in 2000, also receiving the Jury Prize at the New York Expo of Short Films and the Jury prize at the Oberhausen Film Festival. The film went on general release in cinemas with various films in 2000; Time Out described Love is All as 'an ineffable sweet ode d’amour'. The film was screened at Tate Modern London has part of Thresholds of the Frame and was featured in the Barbican Centre exhibition: Passionate Obsessions.

Apocalypse Rhyme (2012) was commissioned by Channel 4's Random Acts and produced by Animate Projects in conjunction with Lupus Films. It was Oliver's first animated film using After Effects. Described by Lucy Felbusch as 'devastating and beautiful' in Savage, the film was also featured in the Italian magazine Artribune and listed in the Creative Bloc 'must see examples of kinetic typography'. The film went on to win Best Motion Graphics in the British Animation Awards 2014.

The Fallen Word (2013) was written and directed by Harrison and his first feature-length film. Described as 'a sinister fairy-tale', it starred Julian Bleach, Steve Smith, Will Strange, Jim Conway, Emma Hill, Dominic Cazenove and Gavin Molly. The film premiered at The BFI Southbank in May 2013, coinciding with the release of The Fallen Word and Collected Films DVD, which was published by Animate Projects and funded by Arts Council England. Jordan Mooney, writing in The Cat on the Wall, said of the film: ' His work has a quality that carries the unusual themes and fantastical elements that reminds one irresistibly of Kubrick'.

Harrison was commissioned by the Concertgebouw in Amsterdam to animate a series of short films for the opera Dream of the Song written by Sir George Benjamin and featuring the celebrated countertenor Bejun Mehta. The films were projected live behind the orchestra in two performances in January 2019.

Oliver Harrison is currently working on a new animated short film called Aria due to be finished in 2023.

== Early music career ==
Harrison played drums with the punk band Satan's Rats from Evesham and, at the age of 17, signed a record contract with DJM Records. The band released three singles, their third, "You Make me Sick", was produced by Dr Feelgood producer Vic Maile. Satan's Rats played in The Roxy in London and various clubs across the country, including Barbarella's in Birmingham. On 18 December 1977, they supported The Sex Pistols at their second gig at the Wolverhampton Lafayette Club, as part of the infamous Spots tour. Satan's Rats also played a one-off gig in HM Prison Long Lartin, where the band met John McVicar who was helping with the equipment.

In 1979, the band changed its name to The Photos and were joined by singer Wendy Wu. At the end of a bidding war the band ended up signing to CBS in 1980. It was the biggest record deal for an unknown band at that time. The Photos spent much of the time gigging, playing in the early days with The Adverts, The Cure, John Cooper Clarke and The Fall and later toured the UK supporting The Undertones and Squeeze. Once, at The Marquee in Wardour Street on 13 July 1980, they were supported by an unknown up and coming Irish group called U2. Later Jools Holland and the Millionaires supported The Photos on another UK tour.

When The Photos played Manchester Polytechnic, they were reviewed by Morrissey in the Record Mirror, writing under his full name Steven Morrissey. The review was also featured in the book, Morrissey and Marr the Severed Alliance. He said of Oliver:

…"Perhaps their only saving grace is their drummer Ollie whose playing is excellent. Will anything happen?"

At the height of their powers, The Photos went on a stadium tour supporting The Police in Europe. The band made a number of TV appearances including Top Pop in Holland in 1980 and The Old Grey Whistle Test in 1981. They headlined the Lyceum in London supported by the Thompson Twins in 1981. Their highest single entry was "Irene" which reached number 56 in the UK Singles Chart in May 1980. The eponymously named first album got to number 4 in the UK Albums Chart, although it was surrounded by controversy that the record company had hyped it (unbeknownst to the band).

The Photos recorded a second album with Tony Visconti in his Good Earth Studios in Soho, London. The album was not released until 2012 by Cherry Red Records. The band split from Wendy Wu in 1982, securing another record deal as a three piece with Rialto Records. The new line up released a couple of ill-fated singles. Disillusioned with the music industry, Harrison left in 1982 to pursue a career in art.

== Filmography ==
=== Short films ===
- Amore Baciami (1988)
- Time (1990)
- Spirit of Place (1992)
- Love is All (2000)
- Apocalypse Rhyme (2012)

=== Feature film ===
- The Fallen Word (2013)

=== Commissioned work ===
- Howards End - title sequence (1992)
- Dolly Thompsett - animated paintings (2011)
- Into the Little Hill - opera (2017)

=== Commercials ===
- Royal Mail - Letters of Love (1989)
- Marie Claire - You reach Me (1989)
- Nike - 180 (1989)
- Nike - All Conditions Gear (1990)
- P&O Ferries - Hotel (1991)
- Rav 4 - Typographer's Dream (1995)
- Molson Beer - Yin or Yang (1996)
- Independent Newspaper (1999)

=== Incidentals and Super 8 films ===
- Rose tinted Super 8 (2016)
- Love is All Super 8 - behind the scenes (2016)

== Awards ==
Film	Festival	Award	Year
Amore Baciami	British Animation Awards	Best Student Film nomination	1989
Amore Baciami	British Animation Awards	Best Animated Film nomination	1989
Amore Baciami - Letters of Love version	Cannes Advertising Festival	Gold Lion	1989
Amore Baciami - Letters of Love version	D&AD awards	D&AD Pencil	1989
Amore Baciami - Letters of Love version	Epica Awards	Epica d'Or	1989
Amore Baciami - Letters of Love version	British TV and Advertising Awards	Gold Arrow	1989
Spirit of Place	Cork Film Festival	Best Cinematography	1992
Love is All	New York Expo of Short Films	Jury Prize	2000
Love is All	Oberhausen Short Film Festival	Jury Prize	2000
Love is All	Cannes Film Festivall	La Quinzaine des Réalisateurs selection	2000
Love is All	Cork Film Festival	Best B/W Short Film	2000
Love is All	Rushes, Soho Short Film Festival	Rushes Prize	2000
Love is All	Court de Brest Film Festival	Short film award	2001
Love is All	TCM Classic Shorts	Highly Commended	2001
Love is All	Dahlonega Int. Film Festival	Audience Award	2001
Apocalypse Rhyme	British Animation Awards	Winner - Best Motion Graphics	2014
