= Kakar Khurasan =

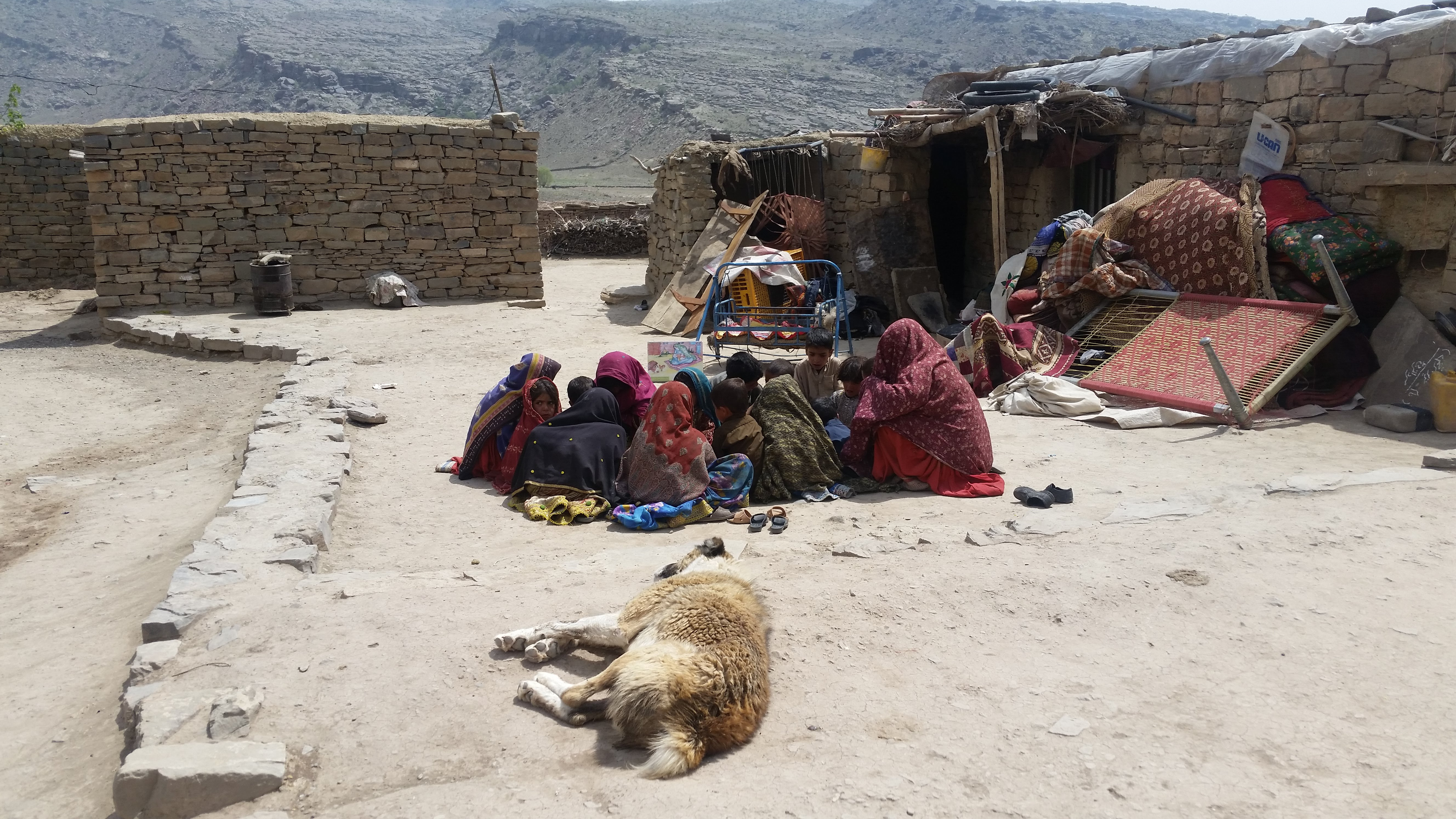
Tribal village in Kakar Khurasan

Kakar Khurasan Subdistrict or Kakkar Subdistrict is an administrative division of Zhob District, Balochistan province of Pakistan. It is named after the Kakar tribe of Pashtuns, some of whom live there, and Khurasan for the old province of Persia of which it was part.

There are two councils in the Kakar Khurasan Subdistrict, Qamar Din with 12 members, and Shafaloo with 11 members. There are two tehsils in Kakar Khurasan Subdistrict, Qamardin Karez Tehsil headquartered in the village of the same name and Ashwat sub-tehsil headquartered in Ashwat village. The kakar and Daavi tribes are the majority pashtoon tribes of this area and here one dam on the name of Daavi dam is located which was constructed some four hundred years ago by Daavi Qoom.

== Services ==
There is a post office departmental sub office at the village of Qamardin Karez. There is no airport and there are no paved (metaled) roads. There are no rail lines.

== See also ==
- Shaghalu
