= 1984: India's Guilty Secret =

2017 book

- Author: Pav Singh
- Publisher: Kashi Books
- Publication date: 2017

1984: India's Guilty Secret is a book by Pav Singh published by Kashi Books in 2017. In it Singh includes an account by Man Mohan Bir Singh Talwar and argues that the violence against Sikhs in 1984 was not spontaneous but planned and led by Congress politicians. He criticises the use of the word "riot", saying it downplays the scale and intent of the attacks, which he views as a deliberate genocide.
