= Jessica's Crime =

American rock band

Jessica's Crime is a sporadically active American independent rock band. Founding member and lead vocalist Aaron Bishop has cited the band's "day-jobs in professional academia" as the primary reason for their occasional, long periods of apparent quiescence. The band formed originally in 1989 as Mistress Christia, morphing into the SpeedKings by the early 1990s, before establishing themselves as Jessica's Crime in 1995, following a number of changes in personnel. Originally from Dallas, Texas, the band moved to Philadelphia, Pennsylvania, in 1999. As of the release of their 2006 record Gone to Texas, Jessica's Crime comprises two members: founder J. Aaron Bishop (guitars, vocals, bass, programming, etc.) and Michael P (guitars, vocals, bass, banjo, programming). Their musical style contains elements of punk rock, post-punk industrial music, dance, and older country music, à la Hank Williams and Lefty Frizzell. According to their website, they had not performed live since late 1999, though in the spring of 2010 they began to play the occasional show in the Dallas/Ft. Worth area.

== Early years ==
The original lineup that would become Jessica's Crime coalesced around Aaron Bishop and Boone in 1989, under the moniker Mistress Christia—a name taken from an obscure series of surrealist science fiction novels by British author Michael Moorcock, later abandoned in light of the disquieting consonance with the Night Ranger power ballad "Sister Christian".

== Musical style ==
The band have described their style as "Ophidian rock music for the cold-blooded intelligentsia and the chemical elite. Plenty of guitars and thundering, cyclopean drummachines. Pure gonzo hell." Critics have drawn comparisons with groups as varied as The Sisters of Mercy, Nick Cave, White Zombie, The Jesus and Mary Chain, Fields of the Nephilim, and even New Order and Johnny Cash. In a 2008 review of Gone to Texas, seminal Death-Rock music critic Mick Mercer picked up on the Sisters and Nephilim undercurrents, describing the record's eponymous track as "Preacher Man waltzing with Vision Thing," while the disc's third track––the jazz-tinged Gateway Shuffle––was likened, somewhat surprisingly, to Goth-folksters The Dancing Did.

== Cover songs ==
In addition to their original material, Jessica's Crime have long been known for their sometimes bizarre choices of cover songs, the arrangements and performances of which often stray far afield from the source material. Notable examples include The Jolly Rogers ode to Blackbeard the pirate, 'The Devil's Son', as well as the Bo Diddley standard, 'Who Do You Love', both from their 1998 LP, Psychosemantic; their second record, 2001's 'Scarecrow + Hizbollah' yielded a techno-metal take on 'Gimme Gimme Gimme (A Man After Midnight)' by Swedish pop icons ABBA, in addition to a surprisingly emotional rendition of Gary Numan's paean to robot-love, 'Are Friends Electric?'; their most recent offering, 2006's epic Gone to Texas included a bar-room singalong of traditional folk ballad, 'The House of the Rising Sun'. They have recently announced that their next project will be an album of cover songs titled PROJECT : GHOLA. While that has yet to materialize, a live album recorded during their 2010 Texas performances has been released, titled ERSATZ.

== Discography ==
- 1995 Wintersongs cassette EP
- 1998 Psychosemantic
- 1999 Psychosemantic (sub-figura 1.5)
- 2000 The Mutiny CD EP
- 2000 Don't Cry CD single
- 2001 Love is Vengeance CD single
- 2001 Scarecrow + Hizbollah
- 2001 Scarecrow (second jihad)
- 2002 Letters to Suzuka: An Anthology
- 2006 Gone to Texas
- 2009 Weird Tales & Gonzo Sleaze
- 2010 ERSATZ (live 2010)
- 2011 No Love in This World EP
- 2014 Myth That Kills

== Members ==
(1989) as Mistress Christia	Aaron Bishop: vocals, guitars, bass guitar, programming; Boone: bass guitar
(1990–92) as SpeedKings	Aaron Bishop: guitars, programming; Boone: bass guitar; Logan/Robert Cross: vocals
(1993)	Aaron Bishop: guitars, programming; Boone: bass guitar; Logan/Robert Cross: vocals; David Hellstrom: guitars
(1994)	Aaron Bishop: guitars, programming; David Hellstrom: guitars; Cliff: bass guitar; Roger Walker: vocals
(1995–96) as Jessica's Crime	Aaron Bishop: guitars, programming; David Hellstrom: guitars; Cliff: bass guitar; Janet Pippin: vocals
(1997–98)	Aaron Bishop: vocals, guitars, programming; David Hellstrom: guitars; Cliff: bass guitar
(1999–2002)	Aaron Bishop: vocals, guitars, bass guitar, programming; David Hellstrom: guitars
(2003–present)	Aaron Bishop: vocals, guitars, bass guitar, programming; Michael P.: guitars, vocals, other instruments, programming
