= P. S. Appu =

Former IAS officer

P.S. Appu
- Born: 1929
- Died: 28 March 2012
- Occupation: Civil Servant
- Organization: retired Indian Administrative Service

P.S. Appu (1929 – 28 March 2012) was an Indian civil servant who retired as the director of the Lal Bahadur Shastri National Academy of Administration (LBSNAA).

== Career ==
Appu started his career as a member of the Bihar cadre of Indian Administrative Service in 1951. In this state he served the Collector of Darbhanga, Saharsa, Finance Secretary and Chief Secretary. While on deputation from the state to the federal government, he served as the Land Reforms Commissioner in the Ministry of Agriculture and the Planning Commission from 1970 to 1975. He opted for voluntarily retirement from service in 1982 while holding the post of Director of LBSNAA.

As Chairman of the Committee on Land Reforms set up by the Planning Commission, he created a sensation by stating bluntly in 1972 that lack of political will was the reason for failure of land reforms in India. He became Chief Secretary of Bihar but left for a lower paid job in the Government of India when he found that the conditions he had stipulated for functioning effectively were not being observed by the political executive. As Director of Government of India's National Academy of Administration he took voluntary retirement on finding that the government would not punish a trainee guilty of reprehensible conduct. That led to such an uproar in Parliament that Prime Minister Indira Gandhi had to overrule Home Minister Giani Zail Singh and announced dismissal of the guilty trainee officer from the IAS.5.

== Award ==
P.S. Appu was awarded the Padma Bhushan by the Government of India, in 2006.
