= Dominic Cazenove =

English actor

- Born: 8 January 1975 (age 51); London, England
- Occupation: Actor
- Years active: 2000–present
- Website: domcazenove.com

Dominic Cazenove (born 8 January 1975) is an English film, television and stage actor.

He was educated at Eton College and Newcastle University, where he read zoology. He then trained at the Academy of Live and Recorded Arts.

Notable screen appearances include the film Lady Godiva: Back in the Saddle, and the Polish television series Londyńczycy, in which he was a regular playing the part of Peter in both series. In 2011, he played the role of Rocky Kelly in Doctors.

Cazenove is a keen golfer and regularly plays at courses around his South London home and at Royal West Norfolk Golf Club where his father was formerly president.

On stage, Cazenove has played in many new productions and revivals, including Shakespeare. In 2003 he was Algernon in a revival of Oscar Wilde's The Importance of Being Earnest. In 2005 he appeared as Sir Andrew Aguecheek in Twelfth Night at the Broadway Theatre Studio, in 2006 was Dromio of Syracuse in a touring production of A Comedy of Errors, and in 2007 played Benedick in Much Ado about Nothing. In 2008, he starred in Royce Ryton's Crown Matrimonial, opposite Patricia Routledge. In 2012, he toured the UK as a clergyman in Funny Peculiar with Suzanne Shaw, Vicky Entwistle, Craig Gazey and Gemma Bissix.
