= Kekkar =

Village in Karnataka, India

Coordinates: 14.3786°N 74.4619°E

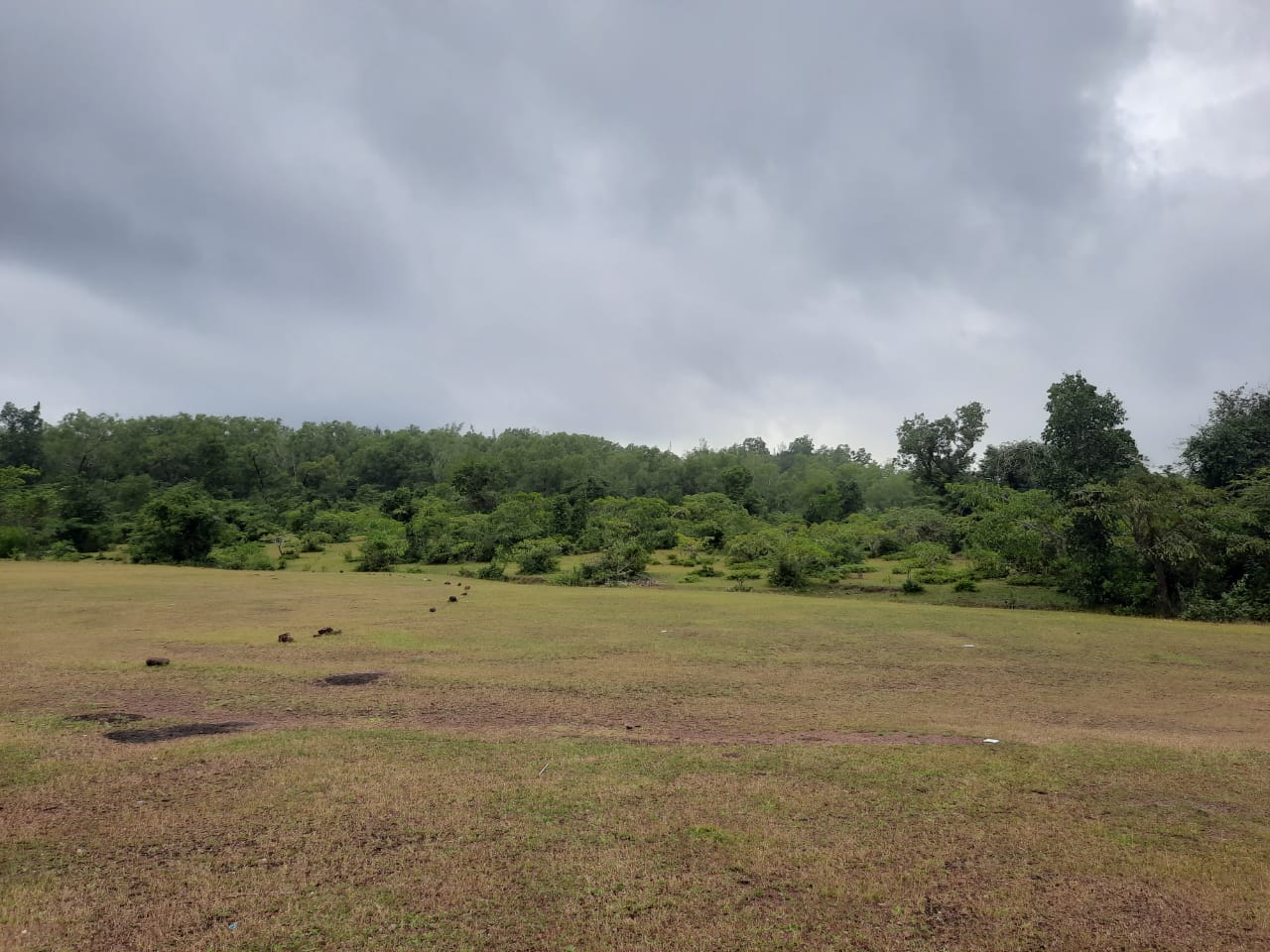
Sallevara cricket ground in Kekkar

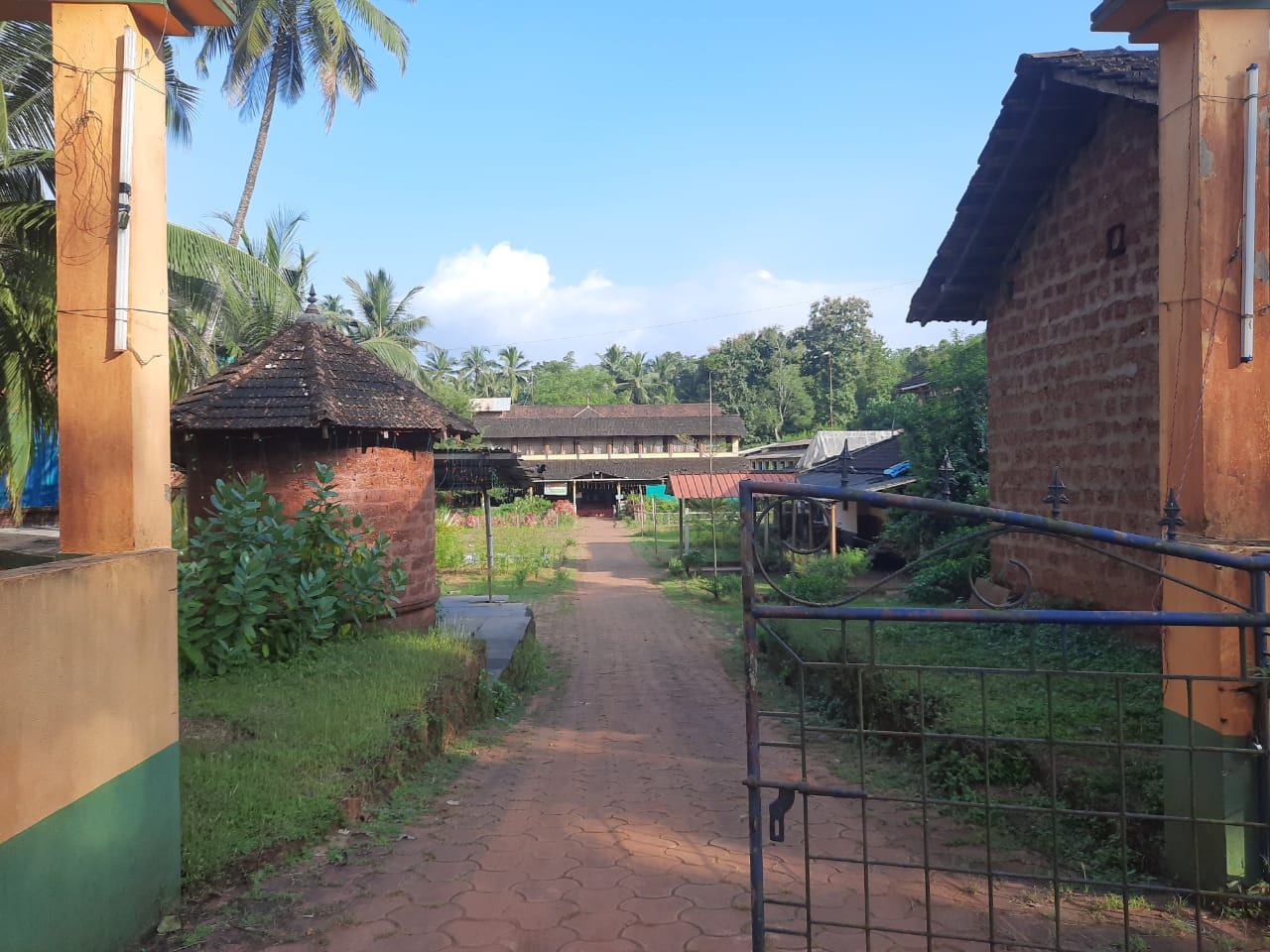
Sri Raghuttama Mutt in Kekkar

Kekkar or Kekkaru is a village in Honnavar Taluk, Uttara Kannada district, Karnataka, India. There is a branch of Ramachandrapura Mutt in the village.
