= Shaghalu =

- Town and union council
- Country: Pakistan
- Region: Balochistan
- District: Zhob District
- Time zone: UTC+5 (PST)

Shaghalu is a town and union council of Zhob District in the Balochistan province of Pakistan.
