= Vineet Chopra =

Indian Medical doctor

- Born: Delhi, India

Academic background
- Education: MD, Grant Medical College; MBBS, 2000, University of Mumbai; MSc, University of Michigan

Vineet Inder Chopra is an Indian–American hospitalist. Since 2021, Chopra has served as Professor and Chair of the Department of Medicine at the University of Colorado School of Medicine and Deputy Editor for the Annals of Internal Medicine journal. In 2025, he was named Executive Vice Dean (Clincal | Quality | Research) for the University of Colorado School of Medicine. Prior to moving to Colorado, Chopra was an associate professor of medicine and chief of the Division of Hospital Medicine at Michigan Medicine and the VA Ann Arbor (Michigan) Health System.

== Early life and education ==
Chopra was born in New Delhi, India, but attended schooling at various places in the world. He attended elementary school in Paris, France, middle school in Cairo Egypt and high school in Japan, before returning to India for medical school. In India, Chopra completed his Bachelor of Medicine and Bachelor of Surgery from the University of Mumbai and his medical degree from Grant Medical College. He then enrolled at the University of Michigan for his Master of Science degree and completed his internship and IM Residency at the Icahn School of Medicine at Mount Sinai in 2002.

== Career ==
Upon completing his internship and residency, Chopra spent several years as the served as the medical director and Lead Physician for the Division of Hospital Medicine at Dignity Health St. Joseph's Hospital and Medical Center. He was recruited to join the University of Michigan in 2008 and subsequently became their first hospital medicine research fellow. Upon completing his fellowship in 2012, Chopra joined the Michigan Medicine faculty as an investigator in hospital medicine. In this role, Chopra received the 2014 Blue Cross Blue Shield Foundation of Michigan's Frank J. McDevitt, DO Excellence in Research Award, which recognizes research that contributes to improving health and medical care in Michigan. He was also the recipient of the 2016 Society of Hospital Medicine Award of Excellence.

In July 2017, Chopra was appointed to the position of inaugural Chief of the Division of Hospital Medicine at Michigan Medicine. While serving in his role of Chief, Chopra received the 2019 MICHR Distinguished Clinical and Translational Research Mentor Award.

During the COVID-19 pandemic, Chopra was one of the front-line health workers responding to the pandemic. In March 2020, Chopra served as co-medical director for the Regional Infectious Containment Unit (RICU) along with Valerie Vaughn and Chris Smith. He also worked alongside Krishnan Raghavendran as part of India COVID SOS, a group of physicians, scientists and policy makers from across the country who were providing home care resources, medication, and equipment to people in India. In November, he co-authored Sixty-Day Outcomes Among Patients Hospitalized With COVID-19 which examined patients treated and released from hospitals in Michigan between March 16 and July 1. The results of the study showed that a third of the COVID-19 survivors reported ongoing health issues.

== Recent Events ==
In August 2021, Chopra left Michigan Medicine to become the chair of the Department of Medicine at the University of Colorado School of Medicine. Prior to joining the institution, Chopra was appointed a Deputy Editor for the Annals of Internal Medicine journal. In 2021, he was elected a Member of the American Society for Clinical Investigation.

Chopra has published over 300 peer-reviewed scientific articles. He is the author of five textbooks and numerous book chapters. He has an h-index of 66 (2025) and an i-10-index of 221, placing him among the top 1% of physician scientists in Hospital Medicine in the world. His research and output has influenced countless medical providers when it comes to decisions regarding intravenous devices. He is also the lead author of several articles on vascular access in UpToDate, a leading platform that provides guidance to clinicians across the world. In 2025, Chopra was named a Distinguished Professor in Hospital Medicine by the Society of General Internal Medicine. In 2026, Chopra was named a Master of Hospital Medicine by the Society of Hospital Medicine.
