= Hari Kishan Talwar =

Indian revolutionary (1908–1931)

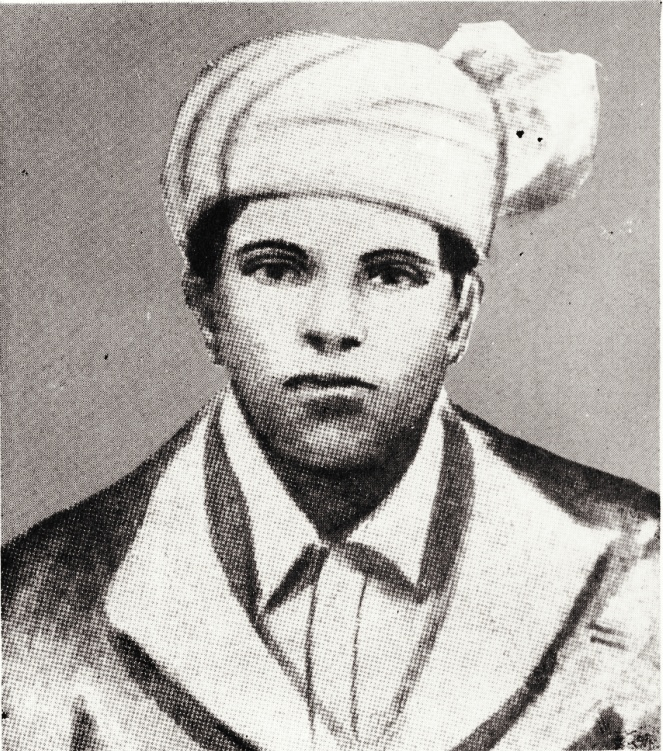
- Hari Kishan Talwar
- Born: 2 January 1908; Jalandhar, Mardan district, North-West Frontier Province, British India (Present-day Khyber Pakhtunkhwa, Pakistan)
- Died: 9 June 1931 (aged 23); Mianwali Jail, Punjab Province, British India
- Cause of death: Execution by hanging
- Other names: Hari Kishan Sarhadi
- Known for: Indian independence movement
- Parents: Lala Gurudas Mal Talwar (father); Shrimati Mathura Devi (mother)
- Relatives: Bhagat Ram Talwar (brother)

Hari Kishan Talwar (2 January 1908 – 9 June 1931) was an Indian revolutionary from North-West Frontier Province. He is known mainly for his attempt to assassinate the Governor of Punjab, Sir Geoffrey de Montmorency. He was a young disciple of Bhagat Singh. He was hanged on 9 June 1931 in Mianwali Jail.

== Early life and family ==
Hari Kishan was born on 2 January 1908. He hailed from the small feudal village of Jalandhar in Mardan district of North-West Frontier Province. He inherited his love for freedom from his father, Lala Gurudas Mal, a hunter who trained his son in marksmanship. Hari Kishan's mother name was Mathura. He instilled in his children a hatred against foreign rule and all the atrocital policies of the white rulers. There was thunder in the air, and the country's youth was afire with revolutionary thoughts.

Young Hari Kishan followed Bhagat Singh and others in Lahore conspiracy case and Ram Prasad Bismil and Ashfaqulla Khan in Kakori conspiracy case. The court statements of Bhagat Singh made a great impact on mind. He became convinced that only a revolution brought about by brave self sacrificing youth could wrest independence from the British Empire. He felt that he could not remain aloof while the country's manhood was being put to test.

Hari Kishan had two elder brothers Bhagat Ram Talwar and Kishori Lal Talwar and two younger brothers Jamna Das Talwar and Anant Ram Talwar. The entire Talwar family were devoted followers of Khudai Khidmatgar led by Badshah Khan and Frontier Gandhi.

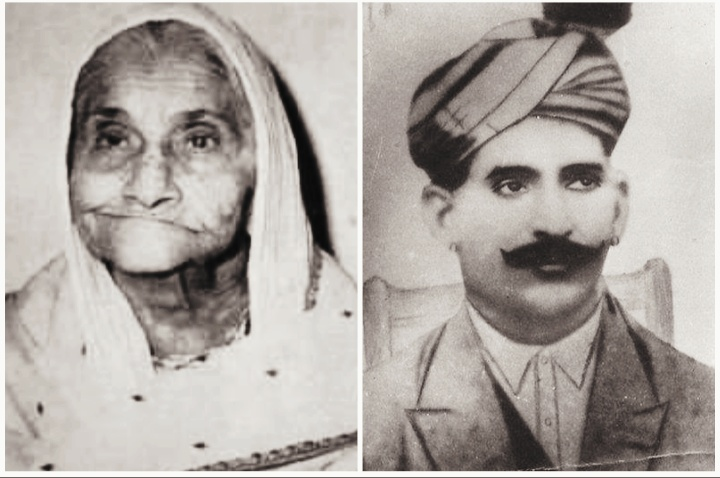
Parents of Hari Kishan, mother Shrimati Mathura Devi and Shri Gurudas Mal Talwar.

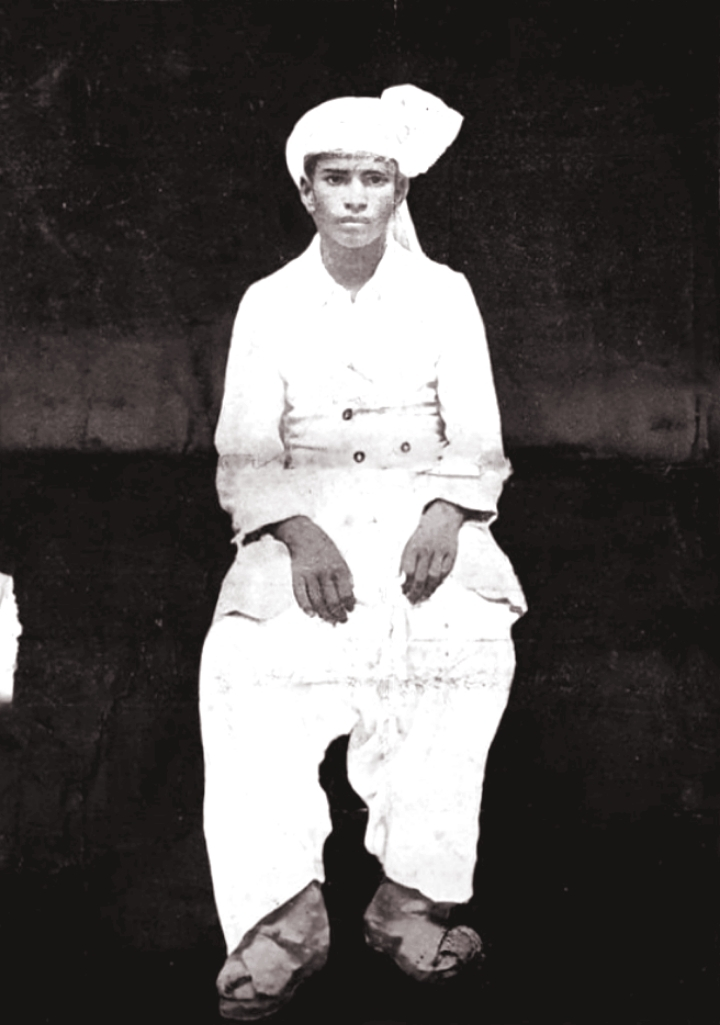
Martyr Hari Kishan Sarhadi (Talwar)

== Attempt to murder the Governor of Punjab ==
Hari Kishan came into contact with a few like-minded young men who had decided to assassinate the notorious Sir Geoffrey de Montmorency, Governor of Punjab. The date was 23 December 1930. The convocation of the University of the Punjab had just concluded between 1:15 and 1:20 p.m. and the Vice Chancellor requested the Chancellor to declare the function closed. When it was done, the procession started, strictly maintaining the order of precedence. Dr. Sarvepalli Radhakrishnan was also present to deliver his address at the university.

Hari Kishan entered the hall without the necessary pass, some time before the visitors had started dribbling in. He was seen sitting all the time in the visitors' gallery, in European dress. When Sir Geoffrey had gone a few paces forward, Hari Kishan stood up in his seat with a revolver in his hand and fired two shots in quick succession, one of which caused a flesh wound in the left arm of the Governor and the other caused a gazing wound to his back. Hari Kishan explained later that the shots had been erratic because the chair on which he was standing was placed on uneven ground and tilted when he pulled the trigger. Although the Governor alone was the target of the attack, there ensued panic in the hall and the audience ran helter skelter for safety.

As Dr. Radhakrishnan later recalled, a young boy of twenty-one tried to 'save' him, when Hari Kishan was trying to shoot the Governor. Hari Kishan is said to have told the future President of free India that he could not take the risk of "hitting Dr. Saheb".

The police on duty rushed to apprehend Hari Kishan. Not heeding his warning, Sub-Inspector Chanan Singh advanced towards him. Hari Kishan called out to the police officer to stand back with the promise that he would not try to escape. But Chanan Singh did not stop and was about to pounce upon Hari Kishan when he fired again, hitting Chanan Singh, who later that day died from his injuries in the Mayo Hospital. Sub-Inspector Wardhawan also advanced towards Hari Kishan, and was shot in the thigh. Wardhawan fell on the ground, bleeding profusely. In the chaos an Englishwoman, Dr. Medermott, also received injuries.

== After being captured ==
All his six bullets spent, Hari Kishan tried to reload his revolver, but he was overpowered and whisked away. He was beaten mercilessly. Later he was taken to the dreaded torture cells of the Lahore Fort and in that cold winter, was made to lie between the slabs of ice.

For fourteen days he was subjected to most brutal police treatment. His head was struck against the stone wall and blood streamed from his skull. Yet, when his father, Gurudas Mal saw Hari Kishan in the Fort for first time after his arrest, for identification purposes, the first question that the old patriot (his father) asked his son in Pashto language, was not about his physical condition; the father wanted to know how he missed the target, after so much hard training in shooting. Hari Kishan smiled and told how the jerky chair had let him down.

== Trial and sentence ==
After the preliminary investigation which was started on 2 January. The accused Hari Kishan was committed to the Sessions Court on 5 January 1931. Hari Kishan made statement before the trial court in the course of which he said

As non violent methods to win nation's freedom were frustrated by repression and thousands of my countrymen, and even women and children were jailed, beaten and insulted.

his belief changed from non violence to violence. His conviction was further accentuated by the speech of Winston Churchill, which led him to believe that an Englishman of this type would never let the slavery in India end. He was determined to do any sensation in order that the world could understand the situation of India. He held the Governor of Punjab, Sir Geoffrey, to responsible for severe repression. He purchased the revolver for Rs. 95. Being in possession of the weapon he decided to take action on the very convocation day as that would be in presence of not only a very large but a distinguished gathering. Hari Kishan was charged with murder of Sub-Inspector, Chanan Singh and was sentenced to death on 26 January 1931 (It is a coincidence that the Free Republic of India came into being on this day, nineteen years later). The sentence was confirmed by a Divisional Bench of the Lahore High Court presided over by Mr. Justice Johnston.

== Death ==
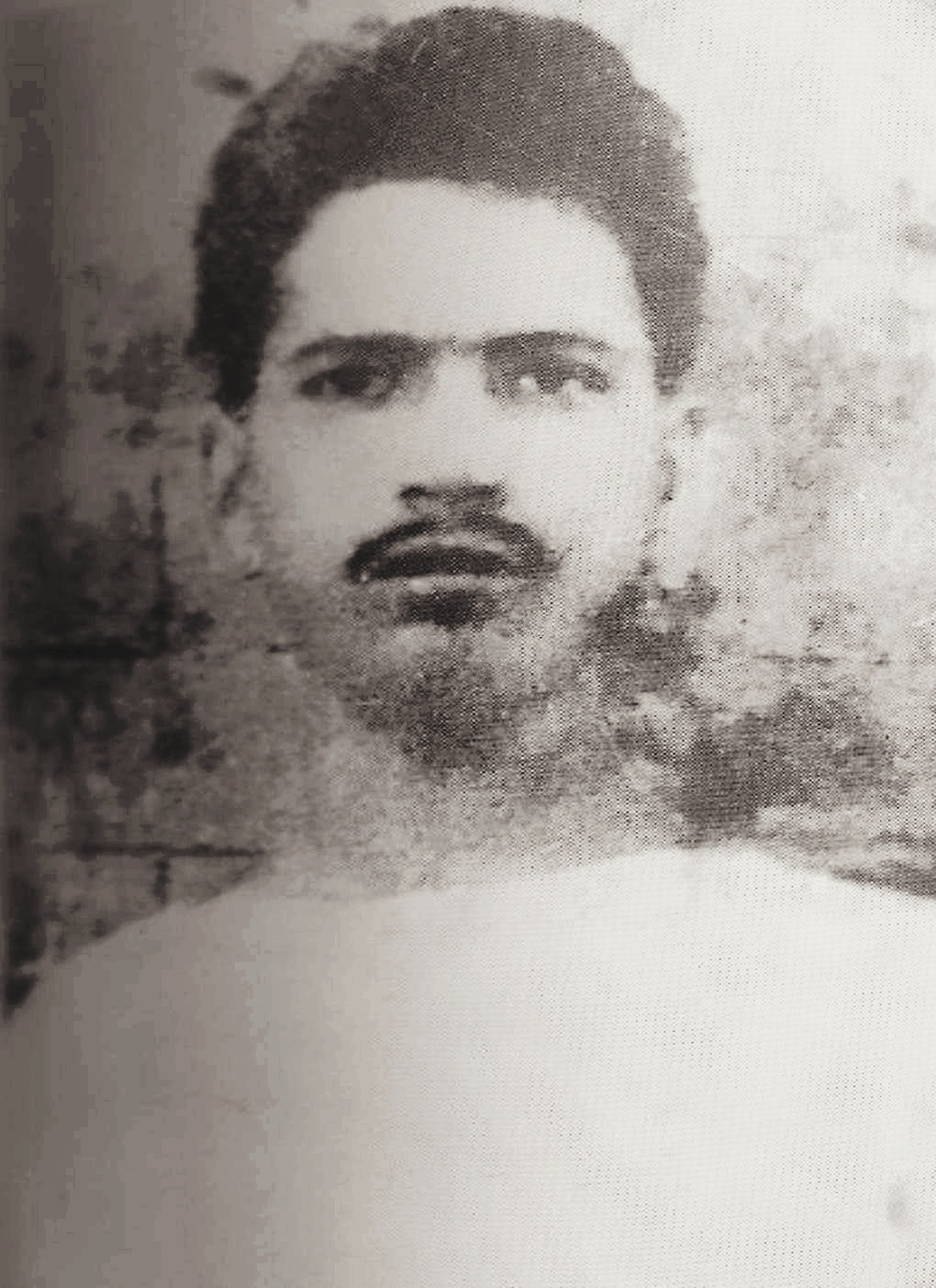
Original photograph of Hari Kishan, a few days before his execution, 1931.

A day before his execution, Hari Kishan told to his people his last wish:

I pray to God, that I may be reborn in this holy land, India so that I may continue to fight the foreign rulers and liberate my motherland.

He also wanted that if his body was released to them, they should cremate it at the same spot, where three martyrs Bhagat Singh, Shivaram Rajguru and Sukhdev Thapar were created and immerse the ashes in the Sutlej, where the remains of these dead heroes had also immersed.

While in jail, Hari Kishan had wished to see Sardar Bhagat Singh, who was lodged in the next cell of condemned prisoners. When the request was turned down, Hari Kishan went on a hunger strike. For nine days he went without food, when the authorities yielding to his firm resolve to meet Bhagat Singh for a sometime. On 6 June 1931, Hari Kishan's brother was informed that the last interview was to be taken place on the same day. On midnight of 9 June 1931, Hari Kishan ascended to the gallows in Mianwali Jail Lahore with a defiant smile on his lips and executed. Even his dead body was not delivered to his relatives. He was cremated just near the jail under strict official supervision. Thus Hari Kishan became one of the youngest martyrs to die for India's Freedom Struggle. Hari Kishan's father Gurudas was also arrested. His trial was going on in Lahore court. Frustrated due to the failure to kill Sir Geoffrey and the shock of the execution of his son, Hari Kishan, shattered the health of Gurudas and he died, 25 days after his son was hanged.
