= Lal Bahadur Shastri National Academy of Administration =

Government institute for civil servants in Musoorie, India

Coordinates: 30.4677°N 78.0540°E

- लाल बहादुर शास्त्री राष्ट्रीय प्रशासन अकादमी
- Seal of LBSNAA
- Former name: National Academy of Administration
- Motto: "शीलं परम भूषणम्" (Sanskrit) (Sheelam Param Bhushanam)
- Motto in English: Character is the highest virtue
- Anthems: "Hao Dharmete Dheer" ( Academy Anthem ); Jana Gana Mana ( National Anthem )
- Type: Civil Service training institute
- Established: 1958; 68 years ago
- Parent institution: Minister of Personnel, Public Grievances and Pensions
- Affiliations: Government of India
- Academic affiliations: Jawaharlal Nehru University
- Budget: ₹205.4 crore (US$21 million) (2025–26)
- Director: B Rajender, IAS
- Location: Mussoorie, Uttarakhand, India
- Campus: 189 acre; Urban Valley
- Acronym: LBSNAA
- Sporting affiliations: Inter Services Meet, Athletics Meet, SAI
- Website: www.lbsnaa.gov.in

Lal Bahadur Shastri National Academy of Administration (LBSNAA) is a civil service training institute on public policy and public administration in Mussoorie, Uttarakhand in India. The academy's main purpose is to train civil servants of the IAS cadre and also conduct the Foundation Course of Group-A Central Civil Services. After completion of training, the trainee officers of IAS cadre are awarded an MA (Public Management) from Jawaharlal Nehru University. It has been functioning under the Ministry of Personnel, Public Grievances and Pensions since 1985.

== Overview ==
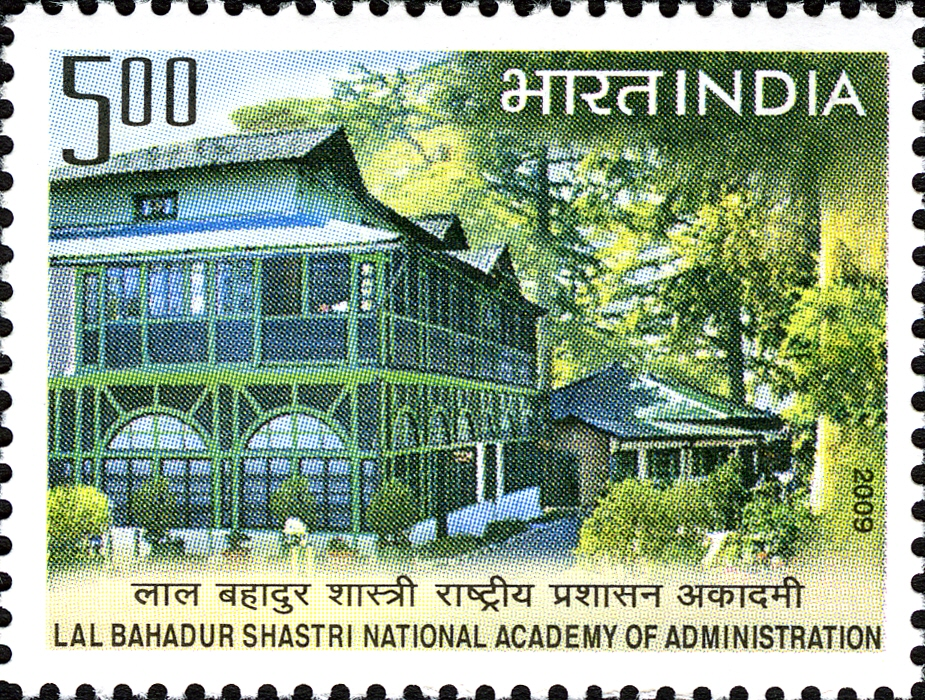
A 2009 stamp dedicated to LBSNAA

On 15 April 1958, the then Union Home Minister Pandit Govind Ballabh Pant announced in the Lok Sabha, that the Government would set up a National Academy of Administration, where training would be given to all the recruits of the Civil Services. The Ministry of Home Affairs also decided to amalgamate the IAS Training School, Delhi and the IAS Staff College, Shimla to form a National Academy of Administration to be set up in Mussoorie in 1959. The Academy underwent two names changes. In October 1972, it was renamed as Lal Bahadur Shastri Academy of Administration and the institution got its present name of Lal Badhur Shastri National Academy of Administration (LBSNAA) in July 1973. The training of first batch of officers started at Metcalf House in Delhi on 13 April 1959 with 115 officers. In September 1959, the academy shifted to Charleville Hotel in Mussoorie which had been the first hotel to be built in this hill station. The hotel was purchased by the government from private hands.

Originally, the main building of the hotel was built in 1854 by General Wilkinson and was purchased by Mr. Hobson, a retired manager of Mussorrie Bank, in 1861. In 1905, Queen Mary of the UK, then titled the Princess of Wales, had stayed in the hotel. The writer Rudyard Kipling stayed at the hotel in 1888. In 1984, a fire destroyed the main hotel building.

The academy functioned from its inception through 31 October 1970 under Home Ministry, moving to another ministry until April 1977, and then again under the Home Ministry until March 1985. From April 1985 on, the academy has functioned under the Ministry of Personnel, Public Grievances and Pensions. In 1988, the academy established the National Informatics Centre Training Unit (NICTU). In 1989, the academy established the National Society for Promotion of Development Administration Research and Training (NSDART), now known as the National Institute of Administration Research (NIAR).

In India, most officers of the premier civil services of the country are selected through competitive Civil Services Examinations administered by the Union Public Service Commission. Applicants who are accepted attend LBSNAA for a four-month Foundation Course. In this course, the feeling of "equality" among all the trainees is introduced.

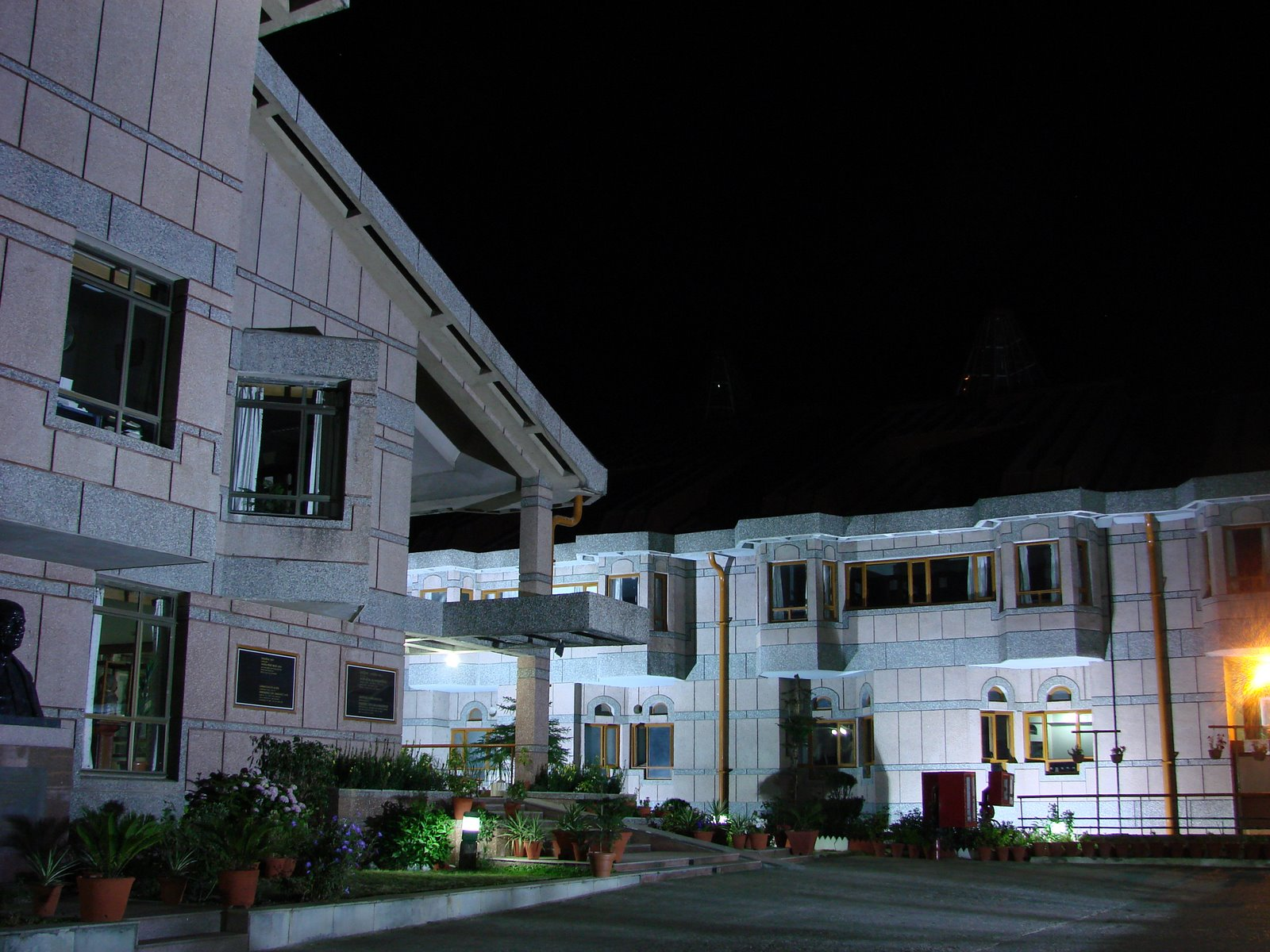
Lal Bahadur Shastri National Academy of Administration at Mussoorie

After this, officers of the Indian Administrative Service continue their professional training at the academy, while officers of other services proceed to respective staff colleges, such as the Sushma Swaraj Institute of Foreign Service in New Delhi for Indian Foreign Service officers, Sardar Vallabhbhai Patel National Police Academy in Hyderabad for Indian Police Service officers and the Indira Gandhi National Forest Academy in Dehradun for Indian Forest Service officers, National Academy of Customs Indirect Taxes and Narcotics for Indian Revenue Service officers, etc.

The academy also began conducting Mid-Career Training Programs for officers of the Indian Administrative Service in 2007. Officers with about 15 years of service who are due to become Joint Secretaries undergo the Phase IV Mid-Career Training Program, while officers with about eight years of service undergo the Phase III Mid-Career Training Program. In conjunction with the partnerships with Google, the academy introduced training in the latest technologies. The academy also conducts a number of short-duration training programs in various aspects of governance and public administration.

The academy is assisted in research in areas of governance and public administration by a number of research centers, some of them having an autonomous status. The most important research center of the academy is the National Institute of Administrative Research headed by an executive director. The academy also has the Center for Disaster Management, the Centre for Rural Studies, the Gender Centre, and the Centre for Rural Credit.

They also feature a scholarly journal in collaboration with Sage Publications known as the Journal of Land and Rural Studies.

== Facilities ==
The newly constructed Aadharshila and Gyanshila buildings have faculty and staff offices, and computer and lecture halls. Sampoornanand Auditorium is the largest central hall used for cultural programs and functions. Indira Bhavan campus about 1 km from the main campus hosts the short-term programs.

The academy has a large sports complex, a library, computer facilities and Wi-Fi, and several hostels for resident students.

== Directors ==
The table chronicles the list of Directors of LBSNAA since its inception in 1959.

Sr. No.	Name	From	To	Service	Cadre
28	B Rajender	1 August 2026	Incumbent	IAS	Bihar
27	Sriram Taranikanti	12 September 2023	31 July 2026	IAS	Tripura
26	Srinivas R. Katikithala	5 September 2021	11 September 2023	IAS	Gujarat
25	Lok Ranjan	15 April 2021	4 September 2021	IAS	Tripura
24	Sanjeev Chopra	1 January 2019	31 March 2021	IAS	West Bengal
23	Upma Chowdary	11 December 2016	31 December 2018	IAS	Himachal Pradesh
22	Rajeev Kapoor	1 March 2014	9 December 2016	IAS	Uttar Pradesh
21	Padamvir Singh	2 December 2010	28 February 2014	IAS	Madhya Pradesh
20	Rudhra Gangadharan	6 April 2006	2 September 2009	IAS	Kerala
19	D.S. Mathur	29 October 2004	6 April 2006	IAS	Madhya Pradesh
18	Binod Kumar	20 January 2003	15 October 2004	IAS	Nagaland
17	Wajahat Habibullah	8 November 2000	13 January 2003	IAS	Jammu and Kashmir
16	B.S. Baswan	6 October 1996	8 November 2000	IAS	Madhya Pradesh
15	N.C. Saxena	25 May 1993	6 October 1996	IAS	Uttar Pradesh
14	B.N. Yugandhar	26 May 1988	25 January 1993	IAS	Andhra Pradesh
13	R.N. Chopra	6 June 1985	29 April 1988	IAS	Madhya Pradesh
12	K. Ramanujam	27 February 1984	24 February 1985	IAS	Bihar
11	R.K. Shastri	9 November 1982	27 February 1984	IAS	Rajasthan
10	I.C. Puri	16 June 1982	11 October 1982	IAS	Punjab
9	P.S. Appu	2 August 1980	1 March 1983	IAS	Bihar
8	G.C.L. Joneja	23 July 1977	30 June 1980	IAS	Odisha
7	B.C. Mathur	17 May 1977	23 July 1977	IAS	Odisha
6	Rajeshwar Prasad	11 May 1973	11 April 1977	IAS	Uttar Pradesh
5	D.D. Sathe	19 March 1969	11 May 1973	ICS	-
4	K.K. Das	12 July 1968	24 February 1969	ICS	-
3	M.G. Pimputkar	4 September 1965	29 April 1968	ICS	-
2	S.K. Dutta	13 August 1963	2 July 1965	ICS	-
1	A.N. Jha	1 September 1959	30 September 1962	ICS	-

== See also ==
- Administrative Staff College of India
- Indian Institute of Public Administration
