= Sanjeev Chopra =

Ex-Director Of LBSNAA

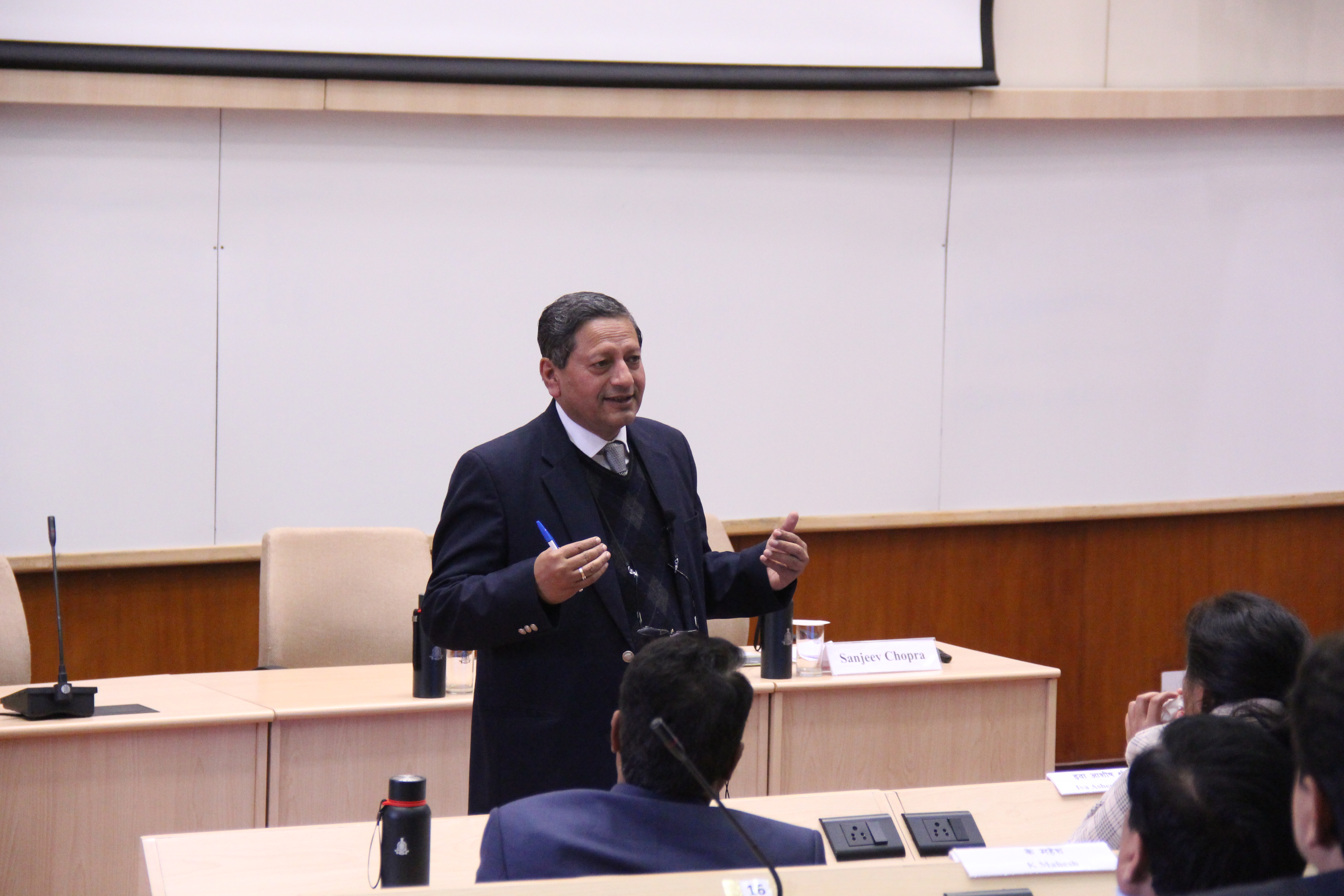
- Chopra in 2019 lecturing as Director, to IAS trainees at Mussoorie.

Personal details
- Born: 3 March 1961 (age 65)
- Spouse: Rashmi Chopra
- Children: 2
- Occupation: Ex-IAS, author of We, the People of the States of Bharat and The Great Conciliator: Lal Bahadur Shastri and the Transformation of India.

Sanjeev Chopra (born 3 March 1961) is a retired Indian Administrative Service officer, author, and historian from Kapurthala, Punjab. He lives in Dehradun, Uttarakhand. He is a former director of the Lal Bahadur Shastri National Academy of Administration and has written the books We, the People of the States of Bharat: The Making and Remaking of India's Internal Boundaries, published in 2022 and The Great Conciliator: Lal Bahadur Shastri and the Transformation of India, published in 2025. He is the patron and honorary consultant to a literary festival, the Valley of Words International Literary Festival held annually in Dehradun, India. Chopra has held the Hubert H. Humphrey Fellowship (Cornell), the Robert S. McNamara Fellowship (World Bank) and positions at the Royal Asiatic Society of Great Britain and Ireland and the Lakshmi Mittal and Family South Asia Institute (Harvard). Chopra is a contributor to ThePrint.

== Early life and education ==
He studied at Lyallpur Khalsa College, Jalandhar. While editing the college magazine, The Beas, he also published his first book of poems Ecstasy in 1978. He contributed to youth magazines and local radio stations. For some time he worked as a journalist for The Economic Times, before clearing the Indian Civil Services Exam. This was followed by a bureaucratic career in India and abroad.

== Bureaucratic career ==
He joined the IAS in 1985, eventually rising to direct the Lal Bahadur Shastri National Academy of Administration (LBSNAA). Over a span of thirty-six years, Chopra served in various capacities within both central and state governments, gaining extensive experience in governance and administration. His career included roles such as additional chief secretary to the Government of West Bengal, where he oversaw departments like Industry, Commerce and Enterprises, and director general of the Administrative Training Institute in Kolkata.

== Books and historical contributions ==
We, the People of the States of Bharat: The Making and Remaking of India's Internal Boundaries is a non-fiction book by Sanjeev Chopra, published by HarperCollins in 2022. The book provides an account of the evolution of India's internal boundaries, focussing on the historical and administrative processes that have shaped the current federal map of India. The book traces the transformation of India from nine provinces and 562 princely states at the time of Independence to its present structure of states and union territories. The book draws on official records, such as the reports of the States Reorganisation Commission and the Linguistic Reorganisation Commission, to examine how political, administrative, and cultural factors influenced the redrawing of India's internal boundaries. The book highlights India's federal structure and its ability to manage internal boundaries largely through negotiation and administrative processes, rather than conflict. It has been recognised for its research depth and accessible style. It is cited as a reference for understanding the evolution of India's political geography and is relevant to ongoing debates on federalism and state reorganisation, including recent developments in Jammu and Kashmir.

The Great Conciliator: Lal Bahadur Shastri and the Transformation of India is a biography of India’s second Prime Minister, written by Sanjeev Chopra and published by Bloomsbury Publishing in 2025. The biography explores Shastri’s journey from his early life in Mughalsarai (now Pandit Deen Dayal Upadhyaya Nagar) and education at Kashi Vidyapith to his rise as a national leader. The book examines Shastri’s political, social, and administrative contributions, including his role in stabilizing India after Nehru and strengthening the administrative framework. The book also discusses Shastri’s iconic slogan, “Jai Jawan, Jai Kisan,” coined during the 1965 Indo-Pak war and food crises, which recognized the importance of both soldiers and farmers to the nation. The biography was launched by Bihar Governor Arif Mohammad Khan in 2025.

== Literary festival ==
Chopra lives in Dehradun, Uttarakhand, where he is patron and honorary consultant to the Valley of Words International Literary Festival. Under his guidance, the Valley of Words Festival has expanded its reach with annual Book Awards and specialised verticals, such as the Hindi literature segment 'Shabdavali’. He has been recognised for these contributions with honours such as the Mahatma Award, acknowledging his impact on promoting literature and writers through the Valley of Words initiative.

== Public Speaking and Media Engagements ==
Sanjeev Chopra delivers motivational talks and engages in discussions on national policies and governance through new media platforms. He shares his experiences and insights on topics such as India's administrative evolution, leadership, and public service, often drawing from his career as a senior bureaucrat and author. Notable examples include his in-depth interview on The Lallantop discussing his journey and success principles.
