= Loveleen Kacker =

Loveleen Kacker is a retired IAS officer and author who is the CEO of the Tech Mahindra Foundation,

During her years with the Indian Administrative Service, Kacker worked in child education, child nutrition and protection.

Kacker has twice been awarded the national-level Children's Book Trust Award for children's writers and has additionally authored several novels. Her recent book was Childhood Betrayed, A Treatise in Child Abuse and Neglect in India.
