= Shaili Chopra =

Indian journalist (born 1981)

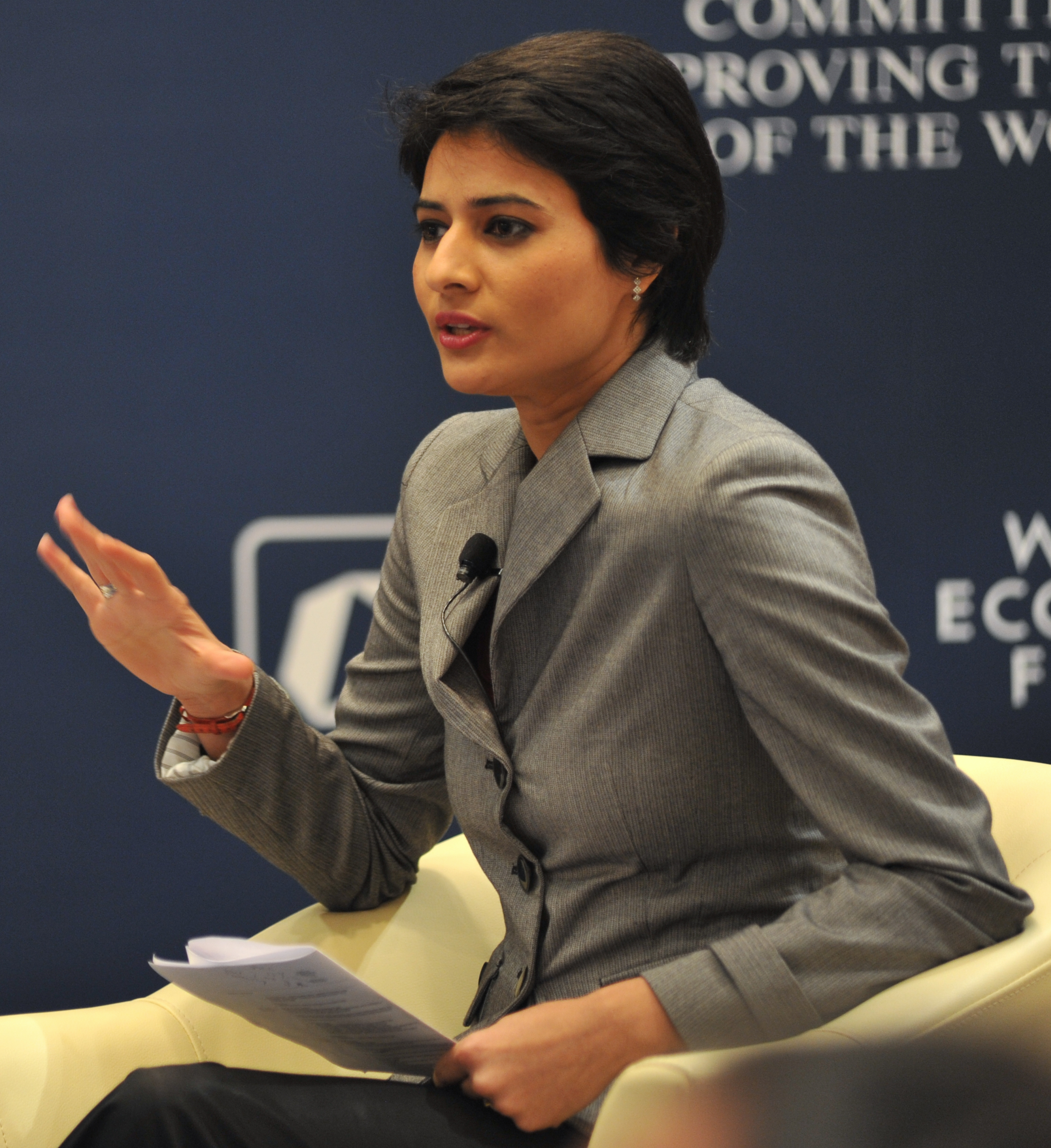
- Chopra November 2010
- Born: 21 July 1981 (age 44); Jalandhar, Punjab, India
- Education: Master in Broadcast and television
- Occupations: Entrepreneur, author (previously journalist)
- Spouse: Shivnath Thukral
- Father: Anil Chopra

Shaili Chopra (born 21 July 1981) is an Indian business journalist, author and entrepreneur. She is the founder of SheThePeople.TV, an Indian digital media website that focuses on women related news and entertainment in video format. As a business journalist, she is known for working at NDTV-profit and ETNOW and has won the 2012 Ramnath Goenka Award for Excellence in Business Journalism among various other awards. She then switched to being an entrepreneur and wrote four books. Her ventures are India's women's channel SheThePeople.TV and GolfingIndian.com. Her books include Feminist Rani by Penguin, When I Was 25 by Random House, Big Connect- Social Media and Indian Politics by Random House, and Birdies in Business by Times Books.

== Early life ==
Chopra was born on 21 July 1981 in Jalandhar, Punjab to Air Marshal Anil Chopra and Suman Chopra. She trained in broadcast with the BBC at journalism school. She has worked at CNBC, NDTV and ETNOW.

== Professional life ==
Shaili Chopra

In 1998, Chopra finished her schooling from Air Force Golden Jubilee Institute, New Delhi. Chopra finished her master's degree in Broadcast and Television from 2002 batch, Asian College of Journalism, Chennai|The Asian.

She worked with NDTV 24 x 7 as Markets & Corporate Affairs Editor and NDTV Profit as the Senior News Editor-Corporate for over five years and then with ET NOW for three years. She has also covered international events like the G-20, WEF@Davos, The Bretton Woods Conference 2011, India Economic Summit and the World Retail Congress. She was named one of India's 50 most influential women in media, marketing and advertising by Impact Magazine.

Chopra and her husband Shivnath Thukral also reported live from outside the Taj Mahal Hotel in Mumbai during the terror attacks of 26/11. She was the lead anchor of ETNOW before she became an entrepreneur. She also had a show on golf called "Tee Time With Shaili".

She started a digital website called 'SheThePeople' in 2015, which focuses on women journalism. Anand Mahindra has invested in SheThePeople.TV. It was also an official partner for government initiatives such as "Start-Up India, Stand Up India" and "Make in India".

== Awards ==
She won the News Television Award for the Best English Reporter across India in 2007 and later in 2008, her business-golf show Business on Course, won the Best Show Award. In March 2010, Chopra won the Best Business Anchor award and was felicitated with FICCI's Woman Achiever Award. Chopra was awarded the Ramnath Goenka Award for Excellence in Business Journalism at the Indian Express RNG Awards 2012.

== Bibliography ==
- Chopra, Shaili (2012). Birdies in Business. The Times Group Books. ISBN 978-9382299110.
- Chopra, Shaili (2014). The Big Connect: Politics in the Age of Social Media. Random Business. ISBN 9788184006087.
- Chopra, Shaili (2014). When I Was 25. Random House Publishers India Private Limited. ISBN 978-8184004472.
- Chopra, Shaili (2018). Feminist Rani. Penguin India. ISBN 978-0143442875.
