= Man Mohan Bir Singh Talwar =

- Born: 1 April 1931; Abbottabad
- Died: 31 May 2019 (aged 88)
- Military career
- Allegiance: India
- Branch: Indian Air Force
- Rank: Group captain
- Commands: No. 5 Squadron IAF
- Known for: Role in Indo-Pakistani War of 1971; 1984 anti-Sikh riots evidence
- Conflicts: Indo-Pakistani War of 1971

Man Mohan Bir Singh Talwar (1 April 1931-31 May 2019) was an Indian Air Force fighter pilot known for his role in air operations during the Indo-Pakistani War of 1971, for which he received the Maha Vir Chakra. He later submitted evidence in relation to the violence upon Sikhs in Delhi in 1984.

== Early life ==
Man Mohan Bir Singh Talwar was born on 1 April 1931 in Abbottabad, then in British India, to Kartar Singh.

== Military career ==
Talwar was commissioned into the Indian Air Force on 14 October 1953 and from 1969 to 1972 served the Agra based No. 5 Squadron IAF, which operated English Electric Canberra bombers, first as squadron leader and then as Wing commander. During the Indo-Pakistani War of 1971, he held the rank of Wing Commander and led several bombing missions into Pakistani territory. Then, along with No. 16 Squadron IAF, he led his squadron's Canberras to Murid, Mianwali, Sargodha Chandhar, Masroor, Risalwala, Masroor, and Shorkot.

== Later life ==
In 1973 Talwar joined the Defence Services Staff College as Wing commander. In 1977 was appointed Group Captain at Gorakhpur airbase. He retired in 1979, following which he took to a garment business from his residence in Delhi.

Talwar's witness statement in relation to anti-Sikh violence in Delhi in 1984, is detailed in Pav Singh's 1984: India's Guilty Secret (2017). In it, he recounts how he was imprisoned for defending his family when mobs attacked them in November of that year.
