= Bhagat Ram Talwar =

Indian revolutionary

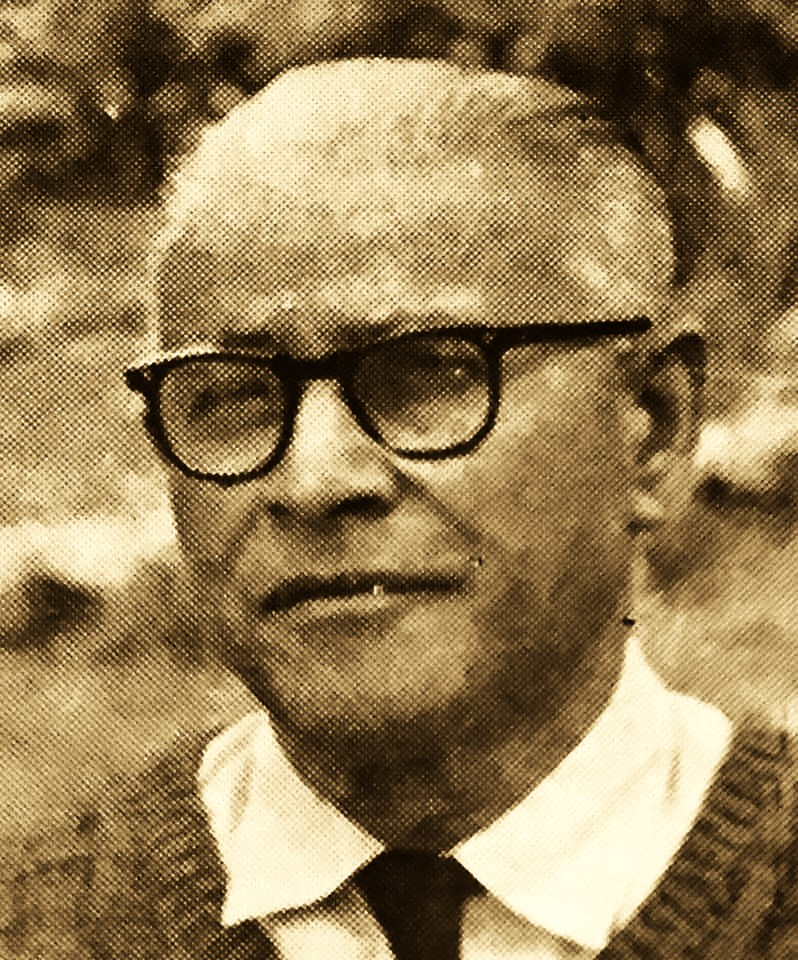
- Bhagat Ram Talwar (unknown date)
- Born: 1908; North-West Frontier Province, British India (Present-day Khyber Pakhtunkhwa, Pakistan)
- Died: 1983 (aged 74–75)
- Known for: Active role in India's freedom struggle
- Spouse: Ram Kaur
- Relatives: Gurdas Mal Talwar (father; died 4 July 1931), Mathura Devi Talwar (mother), Hari Kishan Talwar (elder brother)

Bhagat Ram Talwar (1908—1983), a Hindu Khatri from the Northwest Province of British India, was the only quintuple agent of World War II.

He played an active role in India's freedom struggle. Also known by the alias Silver, he was a freedom fighter and a peasant leader from the North-West Frontier Province in present-day Pakistan. While some authors believe his ancestors were of Punjabi descent, it is known that he was a Hindu Khatri, and identified as a Hindu Pathan.

He was an agent and prominent figure of the Kirti Kisan Party.

== Early life and family ==
Bhagat Ram Talwar's older brother, Hari Kishan Talwar (born 2 January 1908), was sentenced and hanged on 9 June 1931 by the British for his assassination attempt on the British Governor of Punjab, Sir Geoffrey de Montmorency.

== Quintuple Agent ==
Talwar is famously known for his role as the friend of Netaji Subhas Chandra Bose. Talwar helped Bose escape from house arrest in January, 1941. They made the dangerous journey from Calcutta to Kabul, and Netaji eventually made it to Germany. Unknown to Bose then, Talwar was a British spy. Ian Fleming's brother Peter Fleming was his handler.

Bhagat Ram Talwar, also known as Rahmat Khan spied for Germany, Japan, USSR, Italy and British-ruled India for 5 years. Subhas Chandra Bose nominated him to work with the Italians but months later he started working with Germany, Italy's Axis partner. He took money both from Germans and Italians but when Adolf Hitler introduced Operation Barbarossa to invade the Soviet Union, Talwar worked for Russians to fool the Nazis. Later on, Talwar worked for the British who gave him the codename Silver.

== Books ==
Mihir Bose wrote a book on Talwar titled "The Indian Spy: The True Story of the Most Remarkable Secret Agent of World War II" published by Aleph.
