= Renu Khanna Chopra =

Indian Scientist

Renu Khanna-Chopra is an Indian scientist. She is principal scientist and ICAR National Fellow Stress Physiology & Biochemistry Laboratory Water Technology Centre Indian Agricultural Research Institute (IARI) New Delhi.

== Biography ==
She was born in Delhi, India on 24 September 1949.

== Education ==
She was educated at Lady Irwin School, Delhi and Kamla Raja Girls College, Gwalior. She did B.Sc., M.Sc. Ph.D. from Indian Agricultural Research Institute. She is emeritus scientist, Water Technology Centre, Indian Agricultural Research Institute, New Delhi. She was Homi Bhabha Fellow, INSA-Royal Society Exchange Fellow, Biotechnology Overseas Research Associate, principal scientist and National Fellow, ICAR, New Delhi.

== Awards ==
NCERT Science Fellowship, 1965–74; INSA Young Scientist Award, 1978; R.D. Asana Endowment Award, 1980–83; R.D. Asana Prize, 1983; ICAR Outstanding Women Scientist Award, 1995; Platinum Jubilee Lecture Award, 1998; Corresponding Editor, Journal of Biosciences, India; INSA Council Member, 2009-2011.

Fellow: Indian National Science Academy; National Academy of Sciences, India.

== Contribution ==
She has contributed 72 research articles on Research gate.

== Bibliography ==
1. Khanna-Chopra, R. and Patil, R.V. (2002). Successful hybridization between drought cresistant wheat cultivar C306 and high yielding varieties by overcoming hybrid necrosis leads to exposition of hidden genetic variability. ICAR publication. 30 pp.

2. Training workshop manual (1995). Theory and methodology for physiological and molecular basis of stress resistance in crop plants edited by Dr. Renu Khan

Member Executive Council 1 Jan 2013 to 31 Dec 2015; Member Executive Council (Casual Vacancy) 16 Sep 2007 to 31 Dec 2008
