= Mangla Devi Talwar =

Indian politician

Member of Parliament, Rajya Sabha
- In office 1966–1972
- Constituency: Rajasthan

Personal details
- Born: 8 October 1910
- Party: Indian National Congress

Mangla Devi Talwar was an Indian politician. She was a Member of Parliament, representing Rajasthan in the Rajya Sabha the upper house of India's Parliament as a member of the Indian National Congress.
