= Pussycat and the Dirty Johnsons =

Punk band

- Origin: Basingstoke, England
- Genres: Punk rock
- Years active: 2002–present
- Labels: Hound Gawd! Records; Dirty Water Records; Johnson Family
- Members: Puss Johnson; Jake Johnson; Antz Johnson
- Past members: Ian Fuller; Mike Lalor; James Sturtridge; John McGarvey

Pussycat and the Dirty Johnsons, formerly known as The Johnsons, are an English punk rock band fronted by singer Puss Johnson since 2002 and first formed by guitarist "Dirty" Jake Johnson in Basingstoke. Since 2012, the only other member has been drummer "Filfy" Antz Johnson. The band have achieved press coverage in the Basingstoke Gazette, music magazine Vive Le Rock who included their track Vampire Sugar on the free CD with the November 2011 edition (issue 5) and website Louder Than War.

== History ==
Dirty Jake and bassist Ian Fuller first formed The Johnsons. In 2002 they were joined by Puss Johnson together with drummer James Sturtridge. Over the course of the 2000s, they released five EPs with the second and third EPs also featuring harmonica player John McGarvey. Sturtridge was replaced by Filfy Antz in time for the fifth EP in 2007. In 2010 Mike Lalor replaced Fuller on bass and the band, now revitalised and under the new name of Pussycat and the Dirty Johnsons, released debut album Exercise Your Demons in 2010. Album track Vampire Sugar was included on a free CD with issue 5 of Vive Le Rock magazine

Lalor was sacked from the band in 2012 and since then, Puss, Dirty Jake and Filfy Antz have played live as a three piece with no bassist. Second album Dirty Rock N Roll was released in 2013. Vive Le Rock awarded the album 9/10, declaring that the album had "(taken) the elements that made Exercise Your Demons a winner and improving on them ... The twisted humour's still abundant, albeit a tad darker," and declared that track "Hideous" was the album's "coup de grace."

Writer Ged Babey also praised the band and the album on the Louder Than War website: "This is a magnificent, homegrown UK punk rock’n’roll album. Beg, borrow, steal or buy it. Hear it at least and check them out live, that’s all that needs to be said really ...Puss has hair sculpted into cats ears, PVC catsuit or leopard print gear, great big boots. She looks as cool as fuck. OK, she takes inspiration from Eartha Kitt's Catwoman, Poison Ivy and ’77 punkette Soo Catwoman, but in 2013, there is simply no one else who looks like Puss. She stops traffic. She has such style she just had to be the singer in (the) wildest rock’n’roll band in the county ... At their most raging P&TDJ’s sound like the Slits had they chosen rockabilly over reggae as their musical first love ... on the one hand they sing about all the usual fantasy splattermovie stuff; shrunken heads, bodies in ditches and bondage, but coming to the surface and at the heart of other songs there is some real underlying pain."

The group received two gushing live reviews from Neil Duncan in the Basingstoke Gazette in 2014. The first, of their January 2014 gig at the Irish Centre described the band as "Basingstoke punk'n'roll legends" and reported that the band "were really tight and professional with a fantastic sound and a great selection of catchy songs. There was plenty of interaction with a delighted crowd and an all round very lively performance." In July 2014, Duncan travelled to Brighton to see and review the band's performance at The Haunt and again enthused, "They were a big hit from the word go - it was a fantastic venue, with a good crowd and excellent acoustics. The band themselves were on top form and faced an irresistible cheer for an encore, which they duly obliged."

The band released an EP called Dead Songs in 2015 which was a collection of song versions recorded at the Exercise Your Demons sessions but not previously released. Third album Ain't No Pussy was released in 2017. Vive Le Rock scored the album 8/10 with reviewer Lee Cotterell commenting that the band were "on feisty form. The roar of a big cat introduces the title track, a furious stab of garage punk that goes straight for the jugular... All the while Dirty Jake and Filfy Antz provide the scuzzy guitar and pounding beats that keep the momentum going. A strong contender for album of the year."

Fourth album Beast was released July 2020 on Hound Gawd! Records based in Germany. In 2022, members of 1970s punk band Satan's Rats collaborated with Puss as "Satan's Cats", releasing a self-titled EP of four old Satan's Rats songs plus a cover of "The Rocker" by Thin Lizzy.

In November 2024, the band went on hiatus until 2026 to allow for arthritis treatment for both Jake and Antz.

== Discography ==
Pussycat and the Dirty Johnsons discography
- Studio albums: 4
- EPs: 7
- Music videos: 3

The discography of Pussycat and the Dirty Johnsons consists of four studio albums, seven EPs (including one collaboration by Puss) and three music videos.

=== Albums ===
as Pussycat and the Dirty Johnsons:

- Exercise Your Demons (Johnson Family, 2010)
- Dirty Rock N Roll (Johnson Family, 2013, reissued Dirty Water Records 2016)
- Ain't No Pussy (Johnson Family/Dirty Water Records, 2017)
- Beast (Hound Gawd! Records, 2020)

=== EPs ===
as The Johnsons:

- Dirty Rock n Roll (Johnson Family, 2002)
- Return to the Place of Dead Roads (Johnson Family, 2003)
- Holy Moly, it's (Johnson Family, 2004)
- Ready for Action (Johnson Family, 2005)
- A Bump In The Night (Johnson Family, 2007)

as Pussycat and the Dirty Johnsons:

- Dead Songs (Johnson Family, 2015)

as Satan's Cats (Puss Johnson & Satan's Rats):

- Satan's Cats (Salamander, 2022, reissued Dimple Discs, 2023)

=== Compilations ===
- Zombie Nightmares / Star Spangled Anna - Pushing Pussy double 7-inch EP - Pushing Pussy Records – PP 001/PP 002
- Vampire Sugar - Vive Le Rock! Presents Smash It Up, Vive Le Rock magazine issue 5
- Vampire Sugar - Various - You Got Your Punk In My Garage! The Best Of The GaragePunk Hideout, Vol. 3 GRGPNK Records GRGPNK-003 2011
- Vampire Sugar - (as Pussycat & The Dirty Johnsons) Various - No Way Out! Vol.3 CD Dead By Mono Records DBMR011-CD04 2013
- Pretty Good For A Girl - Various - Hell Hath No Fury Vol. 1 Hell Hath No Fury Records, 2018

== Videography ==
=== Music videos ===
Year	Song
2011	"Trouble with the Devil"
2014	"Get Outta My Face"
2017	"Ain't No Pussy"

== Members ==
=== Current members ===
- Puss Johnson – vocals (2002–present)
- Jake Johnson – guitar, vocals (2002–present)
- Antz Johnson – drums (2007–present)

=== Past members ===
- Ian Fuller - bass (2002-2010)
- Mike Lalor - bass (2010-2012)
- James Sturtridge – drums (2002–2007)
- John McGarvey - harmonica (2003-2004)
