= Anil Chopra (air marshal) =

Indian air force air marshal

Air Marshal Anil Chopra PVSM, AVSM, VM, VSM
- Children: [[Shaili Chopra], [Ruchi Chopra]]
- Military career
- Allegiance: India
- Branch: Indian Air Force
- Rank: Air Marshal
- Awards: Param Vishisht Seva Medal; Ati Vishisht Seva Medal; Vishisht Seva Medal; Vayu Sena Medal

Air Marshal Anil Chopra, PVSM, AVSM, VM, VSM is a retired Indian Air Force officer. Until December 2017, he was an Administrative Member of the Regional Bench of the Armed Forces Tribunal at Lucknow.

He is the father of journalist Shaili Chopra and his son-in-law is Shivnath Thukral.

== Early life and career ==
Born on 6 December 1952, Air Marshal Chopra is an alumnus of Sainik School, Kapurthala, from the batch of 1968. He passed out from National Defence Academy in 41 course. He was commissioned as a fighter pilot in the Indian Air Force on 2 June 1973. He retired from IAF on 31 December 2012 as Air Officer in charge Personal (AOP) in rank of air marshal.

Air Marshal Chopra safely ejected from a Mirage 2000 in February 2012, when the aircraft suffered an engine failure.

He had joined the Lucknow bench of the Armed Forces Tribunal on 7 October 2013. His term ended on 7 October 2017.

== Awards and decorations ==

Param Vishisht Seva Medal	Ati Vishisht Seva Medal		Vayusena Medal
Vishisht Seva Medal	General Service Medal	Samanya Seva Medal	Siachen Glacier Medal
Special Service Medal	Sainya Seva Medal	High Altitude Service Medal	Videsh Seva Medal
50th Anniversary of Independence Medal	30 Years Long Service Medal	20 Years Long Service Medal	9 Years Long Service Medal
