= The Photos =

English new wave band

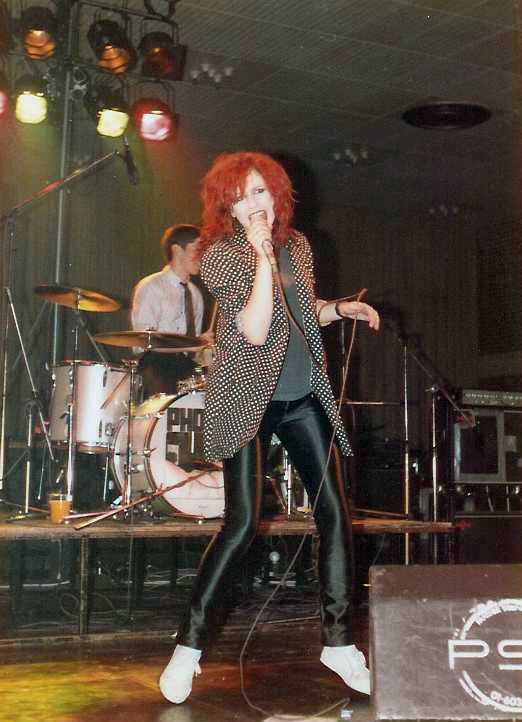
- Wendy Wu performing with The Photos, 1980

Background information
- Also known as: Satan's Rats
- Origin: Evesham, England
- Genres: New wave
- Years active: 1977–1978 (as Satan's Rats); 1979–1981, 1983 (as The Photos)
- Labels: CBS, Epic, Rialto
- Past members: Steve Eagles; Dave Sparrow; Olly Harrison; Paul Rencher (Satan's Rats); Wendy Wu (The Photos); Ché Zuro (The Photos); Angus Hines (The Photos)

The Photos were an English new wave band fronted by Wendy Wu, who had a top 5 album on the UK Albums Chart in 1980.

== History ==
The Photos were originally a punk band named Satan's Rats that formed in Evesham, Worcestershire in 1977, with the first stable line-up of Paul Rencher (vocals), Steve Eagles (guitar/vocals), Roy Wilkes (bass guitar), and Olly Harrison (drums). They released three singles as Satan's Rats before Wilkes left, to be replaced by Dave Sparrow; and then Rencher left, after which the others deciding to expand the group with the addition of a female singer. They unsuccessfully tried to get Big in Japan's Jayne Casey to join, but convinced Wendy Wu (born Wendy Cruise, 29 November 1959), the former manager of pub rock band City Youth to join in 1979. The Photos signed to CBS Records but moved on to Epic Records after one single. They released a self-titled album (Epic, 1980) and number of singles. These included "I'm So Attractive" and "Barbarellas" (concerning the closure of a Birmingham nightclub).

The album was successful, reaching number 4 in the UK Albums Chart, and Wu's picture was briefly a regular item in the music press. Initial copies of the vinyl release of the album (with the exception of the US) came with a bonus album, The Blackmail Tapes, the additional tracks also included on the cassette release, and the album was supported by the group performing numerous concerts around the UK.

The album was later re-released in CD format, although only a limited number of copies were pressed. The CD was re-released in October 2007 by Cherry Red Records, the label originally due to have signed the band before they were contracted to CBS. The re-release includes some additional tracks including "I'm So Attractive."

They released several singles in the UK including "I'm So Attractive". which was added to the US album release. "I'm So Attractive" was not included on the CD that was released in 1999, along with eight additional tracks from The Blackmail Tapes.

At the height of their career, the band made a number of TV appearances. Their scheduled slot on BBC Television's Top of the Pops was cancelled due to industrial action, but their appearances on Top Pop in Holland (1980), Runaround (1980) and The Old Grey Whistle Test (1981) were broadcast. In 1981 they went on a stadium tour supporting The Police in Europe and headlined the Lyceum in London the same year supported by the Thompson Twins. Their highest entry in the UK singles chart was "Irene" which reached number 56 in the UK Singles Chart in May 1980. The eponymously named first album got to number 4 in the UK Albums Chart, although it was surrounded by controversy that the record company had hyped it (unbeknownst to the band).

A second album, Crystal Tips and Mighty Mice, was released in promotional form in 1981, but withdrawn before it reached the shops, and reissued by Cherry Red Records in 2008. Wu left the band in 1981, to be replaced by Ché Zuro, and The Photos split up later that year.

Wu went on to release some generally poorly received solo singles during 1982 and 1983, and then joined Steve Strange to form the duo Strange Cruise in 1986.

The Photos reformed without Wu, although this line-up only released one single, "There's Always Work", in 1983. Later, when Harrison had left the band, they reformed briefly with Angus Hines playing drums. They were joined by Wu for a one-off gig at London's Marquee Club, before finally disbanding. Steve Eagles became guitarist in Ted Milton's Blurt, and later formed Bang Bang Machine. Oliver Harrison went on to become a filmmaker.

In 2022, members of the original Satan's Rats collaborated with Pussycat and the Dirty Johnsons frontwoman Puss Johnson as "Satan's Cats".

== Discography ==
=== Satan's Rats ===
==== Albums ====
- What a Bunch of Rodents (2005), Overground – compilation of tracks from the singles plus 13 previously unreleased tracks

==== Singles ====
- "In My Love for You" / "Facade" 7" (October 1977), DJM
- "Year of the Rats" / "Louise" 7" (December 1977), DJM
- "You Make Me Sick" / "Louise" 7" (March 1978), DJM

=== Satan's Cats ===
(Puss Johnson & Satan's Rats):

==== EP ====
- Satan's Cats (2022) Salamander, reissued by Dimple Discs (2023)

=== The Photos ===
==== Albums ====
- The Photos (June 1980), Epic – UK No. 4
- Crystal Tips and Mighty Mice (March 1981), Epic – withdrawn after promotional copies were released, issued by Cherry Red in 2008

==== Singles ====
- "I'm So Attractive" / "Guitar Hero" 7" (November 1979), CBS
- "Irene" / "Barbarellas" / "Shy" / "Cridsilla" double-7" (April 1980), Epic – UK No. 56
- "Friends" / "Je T'Aime" 7" (July 1980), Epic – withdrawn
- "Now You Tell Me That We're Through" / "Je T'Aime" 7" (September 1980), Epic
- "Life in a Day" / "More Than a Friend" 7" (February 1981), Epic
- "We'll Win" / "You Won't Get to Me" 7" (July 1981), Epic
- "There's Always Work" / "Work Phase" 7"/12" (April 1983), Rialto

=== Wendy Wu ===
- "For Your Love" / "Charlotte" 7" (March 1982), Epic
- "Run Jilly Run" / "Neanderthal Boy" 7" (September 1982), Epic
- "Let Me Go" / "Love Tonight" 7" (October 1983), Epic
