= Mohan Chopra =

Hindi intellectual and author

- Born: September 10, 1921; Gurdaspur, Punjab, British India (Republic of India)
- Died: December 11, 1969 (aged 48)
- Occupations: Intellectual and author

Mohan Chopra (10 September 1921 – 11 December 1969) was an Indian intellectual and author.

== Life ==
Mohan Chopra was born at Gurdaspur, Punjab, India. He received his education at Dalhousie, Gurdaspur, and Lahore. He earned an M.A. in English and taught in colleges at Lahore, Ludhiana, Ferozepur, and Hissar.

== Works ==
=== Short stories ===
Chopra's first short story was published in 1953 in a Calcuttan magazine called Ranee. He wrote about a hundred short stories in his life. Most of them were published in a magazine from Allahabad called Kahani. These stories are included in several collections of short stories titled Aadha Kata Hua Surya, Peele Patte, Sham Aur Akela Aadmi, Band Darwaza, Intezaar Aur Terah Anya Kahaniyan and Mohan Chopra ki Shresth Kahaniyan. A number of these short stories have been translated in other Indian languages.

==== Novels ====
Mohan Chopra's novel, Bahein, was published in 1956. Thereafter, five other novels were published: Needh Se Aage, Ek Chhaya Aur Main, Subah Se Pahle, Ye Naye Log, and Tuta Hua Aadmi. Ek Chhaya Aur Main was translated into the Kannada language and published under the name Bhranti Samar.

==== Drama ====
In the field of drama, three of Mohan Chopra's works were published: Samay Ke Swar, a collection of one-act plays; Chattan Ka Phool, a collection of radio plays; and Aandhi Aur Ghar, a full-length play. Aandhi Aur Ghar was written along the lines of a Greek drama, keeping in view the unity of time, place, and action.

==== Travelogue ====
Vaadiyon Ke Raaste, a travelogue, was published in 1968.

==== Poetry ====
Chopra published two books of poetry: Nai Subah Ke Charan in 1968 and Coffee House Mein Mynah in 2000.

=== Subject of Ph.D research ===
His works were the subject of extensive research by Kurukshetra University. In 2000, a Ph.D degree was awarded to Promila Anand for research work entitled Mohan Chopra Ka Vyaktitava Aur Krititava. In 2009, another Ph.D degree was awarded to Seema Devi for her research work entitled Mohan Chopra Ke Sahitya Mein Vyakt Jeewan Darshan. His works were also the subject of many M. Phil degrees awarded by Kurukshetra and Guru Nanak Dev Universities.

=== Awards ===
His novels Tuta Hua Aadmi and Ye Naye Log, the full-length play Aandhi Aur Ghar, and collection of short stories Aadha Kata Hua Surya were declared the best works of the year for 1971, 1972, and 1973 respectively by the Haryana Government. His novel Ye Naye Log was declared the best work for the year 1972 by the Punjab Government.

== Bibliography ==
- Samay Ke Swar, a collection of one-act plays, 1955
- Baahein, a novel, 1956
- Needh Se Aage, a novel, 1961
- Chattan Ka Phool, a collection of radio plays, 1963
- Ek Chhaya Aur Main, a novel, 1965
- Nai Subah Ke Charan, a collection of poems, 1967
- Vaadiyon Ke Raaste, a travelogue, 1968
- Subah Se Pahle, a novel, 1969
- Ye Naye Log, a novel, 1970
- Tuta Hua Aadmi, a novel, 1971
- Aandhi Aur Ghar, a full-length play, 1972
- Aadha Kata Hua Surya, a collection of short stories, 1973
- Peele Patte, Sham Aur Akela Aadmi, a collection of short stories,1987
- Band Darwaja, a collection of short stories, 1990
- Coffee House Main Mynah, a collection of poems, 2000
- Intezaar Aur Terah Anya Kahaaniyan, a collection of short stories, 2002
