= Malhotra =

Malhotra is the Punjabi variant of older surnames like Mehra, Melhotra, Mahotra, Mahlotra and Mehrotra. (Punjabi: [məlɦot̪raː]) is a Punjabi surname of the Dhai Ghar sub-group of Khatris from Punjab. Families with last name Malhotra are Hindu and Sikh faiths.

== Administrators ==
- Ajai Malhotra (born 1953), Indian career diplomat who served as the Ambassador of India to the Russian Federation.
- Anna Rajam Malhotra (1927–2018), Indian bureaucrat and the first female IAS officer of India
- G. C. Malhotra (born 1943), former Secretary General of 12th Lok Sabha and 13th Lok Sabha
- Manmohan Malhoutra, Indian diplomat
- Jagmohan Malhotra (1927–2021), former Governor of Jammu and Kashmir
- Chandu Lal Malhotra (1766–1845), Prime minister of Hyderabad and former general in the Khalsa Army
- Neena Malhotra (born 1967), IFS officer and Indian Ambassador to the Republic of San Marino
- R. N. Malhotra (1926–1997), Indian banker who served as the 17th Governor of the Reserve Bank of India (RBI)
- Saloni Malhotra, Indian entrepreneur
- Sanjay Malhotra (born 1968), Indian bureaucrat and the 26th Governor of the RBI

== Army officers ==
- Anoop Malhotra (born 1955), Lieutenant General in the Indian Army
- Mohit Malhotra, Indian general
- Om Prakash Malhotra (1922–2015), Indian general
- Ravish Malhotra (born 1943), Indian air force pilot and astronaut

== Artists ==
- Anu Malhotra (born 1961), Indian filmmaker
- DJ Rekha (Rekha Malhotra) (born 1971), British DJ and musician
- Harmesh Malhotra (1936–2005), Indian screenwriter, director and producer
- Jay Malhotra, guitarist in the rock band 'Rumour Cubes'
- Jhataleka Malhotra, Indian model and actress
- Karan Malhotra, Indian director, notably of the Bollywood movie Agneepath
- Manish Malhotra (born 1966), Indian celebrity fashion designer
- MN Malhotra, Indian cinematographer
- Namit Malhotra (born 1976), Indian origin founder of VFX company 'DNEG' that has won Oscars for Interstellar, Ex Machina, Blade Runner 2049, First Man and Tenet.
- Punit Malhotra (born 1981), Indian director, notable for the film "I Hate Luv Storys"
- Shaleen Malhotra, Indian VJ and actor
- Siddharth P. Malhotra, Indian director
- Sudha Malhotra (born 1936), Indian playback singer

== Athletes ==
- Anastasia Malhotra (born 1989), Indo-Japanese tennis player, ranked number 449 in the world.Anmol Malhotra, Indian cricketer
- Ashok Malhotra (born 1957), Indian cricketer
- Caleb Malhotra (born 2008), Canadian ice hockey player
- Gurvinder Singh Malhotra, known by his stage name Shanky (born 1991), Indian WWE wrestler
- Malhotra Chamanlal (1935–2020), Indian cricketer
- Ishan Malhotra (born 1984), Indian cricketer
- Jaskaran Malhotra (born 1989), Indo-American cricketer who hit six sixes in one over
- Manny Malhotra (born 1980), Indo-Canadian hockey player
- Nipun Malhotra (born 1993), Indian cricketer
- O. P. Malhotra, Indian hockey player who was part of the Indian team that won gold at the 1956 Olympics.
- Reema Malhotra (born 1980), Indian cricketer
- Shivam Malhotra (born 1991), Indian cricketer
- Manisha Malhotra (born 1976), Indian tennis player, ranked number 149 in the world
- Vikram Malhotra (born 1989), Indian professional squash player, ranked number 58 in the world

== Authors ==
- Aanchal Malhotra (born 1990), Indian author and historian
- Rajiv Malhotra (born 1950), Indian-American author and Hindutva activist

== Actors ==
- Gunjan Malhotra, Indian actress
- Harshaali Malhotra (born 2008), Indian child actress famous for playing "Munni" in Bajrangi Bhaijan
- Himmanshoo A. Malhotra (born 1982), Indian actor and winner of Nach Baliye 2015
- Kanan Malhotra (born 1987), Indian actor and model
- Kanisha Malhotra, Indian actress
- Kriti Malhotra, Indian actress
- Malvi Malhotra, Indian actress
- Mohit Malhotra (born 1994), Indian actor
- Narendra Nath (1935–1998), Indian actor and producer
- Pavan Malhotra (born 1958), Indian actor
- Payal Malhotra (born 1980), Indian actress
- Prem Nath Malhotra (1926–1992), Indian actor and director
- Rajendra Nath Malhotra (1931–2008), Indian actor
- Reyhna Malhotra (born 1982), Indian actress
- Sanya Malhotra (born 1992), Indian actress
- Sharad Malhotra (born 1983), Indian actor
- Sidharth Malhotra (born 1985), Indian actor
- Vishal Malhotra, Indian actor and presenter

== Businessmen ==
- Dina Nath Malhotra, Indian publisher and founder of Hind Pocket Books
- Nipun Malhotra (born 1987), Indian social entrepreneur and disability rights activist
- Prem Krishen (born 1953), Indian actor and producer
- R. K. Malhotra (born 1947), Indian business executive
- Udayant Malhoutra, Indian entrepreneur

== Businesswomen ==
- Roshni Nadar Malhotra, Indian billionaire businesswoman

== Doctors ==
- Anil Kumari Malhotra, Indian homoeopathic physician and the principal of Nehru Homoeopathic Medical College and Hospital of Delhi University
- Aseem Malhotra (born 1977), British-Indian cardiologist and author
- Atul Malhotra, Indian medical researcher
- Jaideep Malhotra (born 1960), India-based gynecologist, infertility specialist and sonologist
- Raman Malhotra (born 1968), British ophthalmologist and oculoplastic surgeon

== Journalists ==
- Inder Malhotra (1930–2016), Indian journalist with experience in editing for The Statesman and The Guardian
- Vineet Malhotra (born 1978), Indian Television anchor and journalist working with NewsX as a prime time debate show host.

== Judiciary ==
- Anu Malhotra (born 1960), Indian judge at the Delhi High Court
- Indu Malhotra (born 1956), Senior Counsel and former judge of the Supreme Court of India
- Manmohan Malhotra (born 1962), Indian judge
- Om Prakash Malhotra (died 2013), Senior Advocate at the Supreme Court of India
- P. P. Malhotra, Senior Advocate at the Supreme Court of India

== Politicians and activists ==
- Avtar Singh Malhotra (1917–2005), Punjabi politician of the Communist Party of India
- Harsh Malhotra, Indian politician and cabinet minister
- Inder Jit Malhotra (1929–1993), Indian politician and member of the Lok Sabha representing the constituency of Jammu
- Jayant Malhoutra (1936–2008), Indian politician
- Mukesh Malhotra, Indian politician
- Pamela Malhotra (born 1952), American animal rights activist
- Seema Malhotra (born 1972), British Labour and Co-operative Party politician
- Smriti Malhotra Irani (born 1976), Indian politician
- Tara Singh Malhotra (1885–1967), Indian politician and activist
- Usha Malhotra (born 1933), Indian Congress politician
- Vijay Kumar Malhotra (1931–2025), Indian BJP politician and sport administrator

== Scientists and academics ==
- Ashok Malhotra (born 1950), Indian professor
- Deepak Malhotra, American economist
- Neil Malhotra, American political economist
- Renu Malhotra (born 1961), Indo-American planetary scientist, known for discovering minor planets
- Sangeeta Malhotra, Indian astrophysicist who studies galaxies. She works for NASA Goddard Space Flight Center.

== Fictional characters ==
- Giant-Man (Raz Malhotra), Marvel superhero
