= Khanna (name) =

Given name and surname

Khanna is a name.

== Given name ==
- Khanna Omarkhali (born 1981), Russian writer

== Surname ==
Khanna is a Punjabi Hindu and Sikh surname and a Khatri clan. Khannas belong to the Khatri caste and are part of the Dhai Ghar sub-group of Khatri Hindus. According to tradition, Khannas are descendants of a common ancestor named Khan Chand.

Notable people with the surname, who may or may not be affiliated to the clan, include:

- Abha Khanna, American attorney
- Akshaye Khanna (born 1975), Indian actor
- Akshay Khanna (British actor)
- Amit Khanna (born 1951), Indian film producer, director, writer, and journalist
- Anamika Khanna (born 1971), Indian fashion designer
- Arpan Khanna (born 1990), Canadian politician
- Arvind Khanna (born 1967), Indian politician, businessman, investor and philanthropist
- Ashok Khanna (born 1945), Indian cricketer
- Avinash Rai Khanna (born 1960), Indian politician
- Ayesha Khanna, Indian actress
- Balraj Khanna (1939–2024), Indian author and artist
- Bishamber Khanna (born 1930), Indian painter and enamellist
- Chahat Khanna (born 1986), Indian actress
- Chavi Khanna Koneru (born 1983), American journalist and lawyer
- Derek Khanna, American conservative political commentator and columnist
- Dinesh Khanna (born 1943), Indian badminton player
- Dinesh Khanna (born 1960), Indian theatre director
- Ekavali Khanna, Indian actress
- Faqir Chand Khanna, Indian nuclear physicist
- Gaurav Khanna (born 1981), Indian actor
- Gaurav Khanna (born 1975), Indian para-badminton team's head coach
- Gaurav Khanna, Indian-American black hole physicist
- Gopal Khanna, Minnesota's first chief information officer (CIO)
- Hans Raj Khanna (1912–2008), Judge in Supreme Court of India
- Harbans Lal Khanna (died 1984), Indian politician
- Harish Khanna, Indian actor
- Harish Khanna, Indian politician
- Keeya Khanna, Indian actress
- Krishen Khanna (born 1925), Indian artist
- Kum Kum Khanna, Indian molecular biologist and professor
- Madhu Khanna, Indian religious scholar
- Manish Khanna, Indian air marshal
- Manish Khanna, Indian actor
- Meera Khanna, Indian writer and activist
- Mehr Chand Khanna, Indian politician
- Monica Khanna (born 1986), Indian actress
- Mukesh Khanna (born 1958), Indian actor who played the role of Shaktimaan
- Namit Khanna (born 1984), Indian television actor
- Navin Khanna, Indian researcher and scientist
- Nitin Khanna (born 1971), Indian-born American entrepreneur
- Padma Khanna (born 1949), Indian actress
- Parag Khanna (born 1977), Indian American strategy advisor and author
- Paul Khanna, British actor
- Pooja Khanna (born 1990), Indian Paralympic archer
- Pramod Khanna, Indian actor and producer
- Prem Krishna Khanna (1894–1993), Indian revolutionary and parliamentarian
- Raashi Khanna (born 1990), Indian actress
- Rachel Khanna (born 1972), American politician
- Radhika Khanna (1974–2022), Indian fashion designer
- Ragini Khanna (born 1987), Indian actress
- Rahul Khanna (born 1972), Indian actor
- Rajesh Khanna (1942–2012), Indian actor
- Rajinder Khanna (born 1956), Indian bureaucrat and current additional National Security Advisor of India
- Rajnish Khanna (born 1966), Indian-American photobiologist and research scientist
- Rakesh Khanna (born 1962), Indian businessman
- Ramesh Khanna (born 1955), Indian actor and director
- Ranjana Khanna, American literary critic and theorist
- Ravi Khanna (born 1957), Indian actor, journalist and writer
- Renu Khanna Chopra (born 1949), Indian scientist
- Rini Simon Khanna (born 1964), Indian news anchor
- Rinkle Khanna (born 1977), Indian actress
- Ro Khanna (born 1976), American politician
- Roma Khanna, American television and digital media executive
- Sanjeev Khanna, Indian-American computer scientist
- Sanjiv Khanna (born 1960), Judge of the Supreme Court of India and the 51st Chief Justice of India
- Satish Khanna (born 1928), Indian cricketer
- Shalini Khanna (born 1983), Indian actress
- Shipra Khanna (born 1981), Indian celebrity chef
- Sikandar Khanna, Indian director
- Smriti Khanna (born 1984), Indian actress and model
- Sucheta Khanna, Indian actress
- Suresh Kumar Khanna (born 1953), Indian politician
- Surinder Khanna (born 1956), Indian cricketer
- Tarun Khanna (born 1968), Indian-born American academic and author
- Tarun Khanna, Indian actor
- Tanvi Khanna (born 1996), Indian squash player
- Tejendra Khanna (born 1938), Indian politician and the former Lieutenant Governor of Delhi
- Twinkle Khanna (born 1973), Indian actress
- Usha Khanna (born 1941), Indian music director in Hindi cinema
- Vikas Khanna (born 1971), Indian celebrity chef
- Vikramaditya Khanna, Indo-American lawyer and law professor
- Vinod Khanna (1946–2017), Indian actor
- Vipin Khanna (1930–2019), Indian businessman, financier and Indian Army officer
