= 1994 Rajya Sabha elections =

Elections for the Upper House of Indian Parliament

Rajya Sabha elections were held in 1994 to elect members of the Rajya Sabha, the Indian Parliament's upper chamber. 3 seats from Delhi & 1 seat from Sikkim, 58 members from 12 states, and 3 members from Kerala State were elected.

== Elections ==
Elections were held in 1994 to elect members from various states. The list is incomplete.

=== Members elected ===
The following members were elected in 1994. They were members for the term 1994-2000 and retired in 2000, except in the case of resignation or death before the end of the term.

State - Member - Party

Rajya Sabha members for term 1994–2000
State	Member Name	Party	Remark
DL	O P Kohli	BJP	
DL	K R Malkani	BJP	
DL	V K Malhotra	BJP	res 06/10/1999
SK	Karma Tazing Topden	SKF	
AP	V Kishore Chandra Deo	INC	R
AP	Alladi P Rajkumar	INC	
AP	Satyanarayana Dronamraju	INC	
AP	K. Mohammed Khan	INC	
AP	Yerra Narayanasawami	TDP	res 21/10/1999
AP	Tulsi Das Majji	INC	Dea 21/09/1994
Bihar	Aas Mohammad	JD	R
Bihar	Kamla Sinha	JD	
Bihar	Dr Jagannath Mishra	INC	
Bihar	Janardhan Yadav	BJP	
Bihar	Jalaludin Ansari	CPI	
Bihar	Naresh Yadav	RJD	
Bihar	Nagmani	RJD	07/10/1999
Bihar	Sitaram Kesari	INC	
GJ	Yoginder Kumar Bhagatram	IND	bye 26/11/1996
GJ	Madhavsinh Solanki	INC	
GJ	Rajubhai Parmar	INC	
GJ	Prafulbhai Garodia	BJP	
GJ	Anandiben Patel	BJP	res. 12/03/1998 GJ Assembly
GJ	K M Mangrola	BJP	Res 02/11/1996
HR	Faqir Chand	INLD	
HR	Ramji Lal	INC	
HP	Kripal Parmar	BJP	
HP	Sushil Barongpa	INC	
KA	Janardhana Poojary	INC	
KA	K. Rahman Khan	INC	
KA	M. Rajasekara Murthy	INC	Res 23/08/1999
KA	H. Hanumanthappa	INC	
MP	H. R. Bhardwaj	INC	
MP	Ghufran Aazam	INC	
MP	Govind Ram Miri	BJP	
MP	Raghavji	BJP	
MP	Veena Verma	INC	
MP	Radhakishan Chhotuji Malviya	INC	
MH	Sanjay Nirupum	SS	
MH	V N Gadgil	INC	
MH	Saroj Khaparde	INC	
MH	Gopalrao V Patil	INC	
MH	Govindrao Adik	NCP	
MH	Ram Jethmalani	OTH	
MH	Suresh Kalmadi	INC	Res 10/05/1996
OR	Bhagaban Majhi	JD	
OR	Rahas Bihari Barik	JD	
OR	Sanatan Bisi	BJD	
RJ	Kanak Mal Katara	BJP	
RJ	Bhuvnesh Chaturvedi	INC	
RJ	Onkar Singh Lakhawat	--	
RJ	Satish Agarwal	BJP	10/09/1997
UP	Janeshwar Mishra	SP	
UP	Ram Nath Kovind	BJP	
UP	Jayant Kumar Malhoutra	IND	
UP	Ish Dutt Yadav	SP	Dea 19/09/1999
UP	Malti Devi Sharma	BJP	
UP	Raj Nath Singh	BJP	
UP	Raj Babbar	INC	res LS
UP	Jitendra Prasad	INC	res 07/10/1999 LS
UP	Mayawati	BSP	Res 25/10/1996
UP	Dara Singh Chauhan	BSP	bye 30/11/1996
UP	Jitendra Prasad	INC	res LS
UP	Dr Ranbir Singh	BJP	
UP	Ram Vaksa	--	
UP	Prof R. B. S. Varma	BJP	
WB	Nilotpal Basu	CPM	
WB	Dipankar Mukherjee	CPM	
WB	Joyanta Roy	ppp	
WB	Gurudas Dasgupta	CPI	
WB	Biplab Dasgupta	CPM	Dea 17–07–2005
Kerala	Vayalar Ravi	INC	
Kerala	E. Balanandan	CPM	
Kerala	M. P. Abdussamad Samadani	ML	

== Bye-elections ==
The following bye-elections were held in the year 1994.

State - Member - Party

1. AP - T. Venkatram Reddy - INC ( ele 31/01/1994 term till 1996 )
2. UP - Sanjay Dalmia - SP ( ele 03/02/1994 term till 1998 )
