= Mehra =

- Language: Punjabi, Dogri, Kumaoni, Hindi

Origin
- Meaning: Sun / Chief / Master
- Region of origin: Punjab, India

Mehra is a Khatri Hindu surname found in India, predominantly in the Punjab, Delhi and Jammu regions. They generally come under the Dhai Ghar group of the Khatri caste. Mehra surname are mainly Khatri in origin but many clans from other states also uses this surname as well. This surname derives from the word Mihir, meaning sun or master. According to Aditya Malik, the Mehras of Uttarakhand are a community of Rajput landowners in the Kumaon Division of the Central Himalayas.

== Variations ==
Later modifications of this surname are Mehrotra and Malhotra. Malhotra is the Punjabi language version of Mehrotra.

== Notable persons ==
Notable people with the surname, who may or may not be affiliated with Rajputs or Khatris, include:

- Ajay Mehra (born 1969), Indian cricketer and sports commentator
- Amit Mehra (born 1992), Indian model and actor
- Amod Mehra, Indian analyst and film journalist
- Ayush Mehra (born 1991), Indian actor
- Benita Mehra, British engineer
- Bhanu Sri Mehra (born 1986), Indian actress in Telugu, Tamil and Punjabi films
- Bharat Mehra, Indian-American researcher
- Brij Bhushan Mehra (died 1991), Indian politician
- Divya Mehra (born 1981), Canadian artist
- Gulshan Mehra (1937–1986), Indian cricketer
- Hiten Mehra (born 1997), Indian cricketer
- Jagdish Mehra (1931–2008), Indian-American physicist and science historian
- Jankidas Mehra (1910–2003), Indian actor
- Kailash Mehra Sadhu (born 1956), Indian singer in Kashmiri languages
- Kapish Mehra, Indian publishing executive
- Karan Mehra (born 1982), Indian television actor, model and fashion designer
- Karan Veer Mehra (born 1982), Indian television actor
- Lal Chand Mehra (1897–1980), Indian-American actor
- Madan Mehra (born 1934), Indian cricketer
- Mandeep R. Mehra (born 1964), Indian-American cardiologist
- Moti Ram Mehra (died 1704), Sikh disciple and martyr
- Narinder Kumar Mehra (born 1949), Indian immunologist
- Neelam Mehra (born 1955), Indian actress
- Nitya Mehra (born 1980), Indian film director and screenwriter
- Om Prakash Mehra (1919–2015), Indian Air Force chief from 1973 to 1976
- Prakash Mehra (1939–2009), Indian film director and producer of Hindi films
- Prince Mehra, Indian social worker
- Puneet Mehra (born 1988), Indian cricketer
- Raj Mehra (1913–1993), Indian character actor in Bollywood films
- Raj Kumar Mehra (1918–2001), Indian cyclist
- Rajan Mehra (1933–2010), Indian cricket umpire
- Rajnish Mehra (born 1950), Indian-American economist
- Ramprakash Mehra (1917–1983), Indian cricketer and cricket administrator
- Rakeysh Omprakash Mehra (born 1963), Indian filmmaker and screenwriter
- Rebecca Mehra (born 1994), American middle-distance runner
- Ribbhu Mehra, Indian television actor, model and DJ
- Rohan Mehra (born 1990), Indian actor and model
- Rohan Mehra (born 1991), Indian Hindi film actor
- Rohit Mehra (born 1978), Indian cricketer
- Rooma Mehra (born 1967), Indian poet, painter, sculptor, newspaper writer and columnist
- Sachit Mehra, Canadian businessman and political organizer
- Shiela Mehra, Indian gynaecologist and obstetrician
- Shiv Mehra, guitarist in the American black metal band Deafheaven
- Smriti Mehra (born 1972), Indian golfer
- Surinder Mehra (1932–2003), Indian Air Force chief from 1988 to 1991
- Umesh Mehra, Indian director and producer of Bollywood films
- Usha Mehra (born 1941), Indian judge
- Vijay Mehra (Emirati cricketer) (born 1963)
- Vijay Mehra (Indian cricketer) (1938–2006)
- Vinod Mehra (1945–1990), Indian actor in Bollywood films
