= David Broockman =

American political scientist

Academic background
- Education: Yale University (B.A.); University of California, Berkeley (Ph.D)
- Doctoral advisor: Eric Schickler, Jasjeet S. Sekhon

Academic work
- Discipline: Political science
- Sub-discipline: American politics

David Broockman is an American political scientist. He is an associate professor of political science at the University of California, Berkeley, and is best known for his research on political polarization, political persuasion, and reducing prejudice toward transgender people and undocumented immigrants, which has been widely covered in the national and international press. In 2025, he was noted as the most prolific contributor to top political science journals globally over the preceding five years.

== Early life and education ==
He was raised in Texas. Broockman attended Yale University, where he was a member of the Skull and Bones Society, and was influenced by a class taught by Don Green and Alan Gerber. He has a PhD in Political Science from University of California, Berkeley.

== Career ==
Broockman's career in academia began in 2015, when he became an assistant professor at the Graduate School of Business at Stanford University. He was promoted to associate professor at Stanford in 2019 when he also became a National Fellow at the Hoover Institution. In 2020, he moved to become an associate professor of Political Science at the University of California, Berkeley.

=== Research ===
==== "When Contact Changes Minds" ====
In 2015, while still a graduate student, Broockman along with Joshua Kalla and Peter Aronow, "expos[ed] one of the biggest scientific frauds in recent memory". They showed that a prominent study entitled "When Contact Changes Minds: An Experiment on Transmission of Support for Gay Equality” published in Science Magazine was fraudulent. The scientific paper was retracted after the senior author, Donald Green, requested that it be so. For exposing the fraud, Broockman and Kalla won the 2015 Leamer-Rosenthal Prize for Transparency in the Social Sciences.

The fraudulent paper purported to show that a single canvassing conversation can increase support for same-sex marriage in a durable way. The finding of fraud raised many doubts about the role of canvassing in political persuasion. Although the scientific article was found to be fraudulent, Broockman and Kalla conjectured that the underlying claim that high-quality door-to-door canvassing conversations could decrease prejudice might be true. In a subsequent article published in Science Magazine, Broockman and Kalla demonstrated that door-to-door canvassing successfully reduces transgender prejudice, with the effects persisting months later in follow-up surveys.

==== Other research ====
Broockman and Kalla have also published on the minimal effects of most persuasive interventions.

Broockman's other research has also received significant public attention. For example, in a 2013 study, Broockman argues that legislators consistently believe their constituents are more conservative than they actually are. Some conjectured that this study explained why it is so challenging to pass liberal laws.

Broockman has also critiqued prevailing understandings of political polarization. In a 2015 study, he argued that many voters do not have moderate views, and are happy to see polarized politicians representing them. He has also argued that affective polarization does not meaningfully undermine political accountability.

In a 2017 article with Neil Malhotra, he argues that there is significant heterogeneity in the preferences of wealthy individuals. The article shows that technology entrepreneurs support liberal redistributive, social, and globalist policies but conservative regulatory policies which is a combination of preferences that is rare among wealthy political donors more generally.

==== Articles ====
- David Broockman; Robert Fruchtman (7 April 2022). "A wall of skyscrapers along Ocean Beach? It could happen if S.F. doesn't stop bungling its planning process". San Francisco Chronicle.
- David Broockman; Joshua Kalla (25 February 2020). "Bernie Sanders looks electable in surveys — but it could be a mirage". Vox.
- David Broockman (11 October 2017). "Persuading voters is hard. That doesn't mean campaigns should give up". The Washington Post. ISSN 0190-8286.

=== Awards ===
Broockman has won numerous scholarly awards. In 2014, he won the Lawrence Longely Award for the best paper published on representation and electoral systems. In 2015, he shared the Leamer-Rosenthal Prize for Transparency in the Social Sciences. In 2017, he shared the Cialdini prize from the Society for Personality and Social Psychology. In 2019, he shared the Joseph L. Bernd award for the best article published in The Journal of Politics. In 2020, he won the Emerging Scholar Award from the American Political Science Association's Elections, Public Opinion, and Voting Behavior section. In 2024, he was selected to the Andrew Carnegie Fellowship program.

== Personal life ==
On 5 July 2025, he married his same-sex partner Alex Lau in London.

== Selected publications ==
- Broockman, David; Kalla, Joshua; Aronow, Peter. "Irregularities in LaCour (2014)". doi:10.31222/osf.io/qy2se. S2CID 242937616. (preprint)
- Broockman, David; Kalla, Joshua (2016). "Durably Reducing Transphobia: A Field Experiment on Door-to-Door Canvassing". Science. 352 (6282): 220–224. Bibcode:2016Sci...352..220B. doi:10.1126/science.aad9713. PMID 27124458. S2CID 206645910.
- Broockman, David; Skovron, Christopher (2018). "Bias in Perceptions of Public Opinion among Political Elites". American Political Science Review. 112 (3): 542–563. doi:10.1017/S0003055418000011. S2CID 148883885.
- Kalla, Joshua; Broockman, David (2018). "The Minimal Persuasive Effects of Campaign Contact in General Elections: Evidence from 49 Field Experiments". American Political Science Review. 112: 148–166. doi:10.1017/S0003055417000363. S2CID 149306936.
