= Manmohan Singh (disambiguation) =

Manmohan Singh (1932–2024) served as the 13th Indian Prime Minister.

The name may also refer to one of the following people:

- Manmohan Singh (film director), Indian director
- Man Mohan Singh (pilot) (1905–1942), Indian aircraft pilot

== See also ==
- Manmohan, Indian male given name
- Singh, Indian surname
- Manmohan Singh ministry (disambiguation)
- Man Mohan Singh Ahuja or M. M. S. Ahuja (1929–1998), Indian physician and endocrinologist
- Man Mohan Singh Gujral, Indian judge, first Chief Justice of the Sikkim High Court
- Manmohan Singh Liberhan, former Chief Justice of the Andhra Pradesh High Court, India
  - Liberhan Ayodhya Commission of Inquiry, which prepared a report on the Demolition of the Babri Masjid
- Man Mohan Singh Rai, Indian Army general, former Vice Chief of Army Staff
- Man Mohan Sinha, Indian Air Force officer
