= Tata Tapes controversy =

1997 Political scandal in India

The "Tata Tapes" controversy was a political scandal in India that was the culmination of a series of allegations of anti-national conduct levied by the then Chief Minister of Assam, Prafulla Kumar Mahanta, against the Tatas – their company Tata Tea in particular. The controversy erupted when journalist Ritu Sarin of the Indian Express broke a story that involved the illegal tapping of the telephone calls of business tycoon Nusli Wadia and published, on 4–5 October 1997, transcripts of the telephone conversations he had with Keshub Mahindra, Field Marshal Sam Maneckshaw, then Rajya Sabha Member of Parliament Jayant Malhoutra and Ratan Tata about Tata Tea's problems with the Assam Government.

== History ==
In the 1990s, the banned terror outfit United Liberation Front of Asom (ULFA) was extremely active in Assam, and had been extorting money from tea companies to fund its activities. That most companies were paying up in fear was a well known fact. But Tata Tea never did, and this was confirmed by ULFA Commander-in-Chief Paresh Baruah in an interview published by Rediff.com, though according to Baruah, they did pay a ransom of ₹10 million in 1993 to secure the release of their regional manager Bolin Bordoloi from the clutches of another banned terror outfit, National Democratic Front of Bodoland, something that Tata Tea executive director S. M. Kidwai denied.

During 1997, the ULFA and Bodo militants were involved in many terror attacks and other militant activities, the biggest ones being the failed assassination attempt by ULFA on Chief Minister Prafulla Kumar Mahanta, head of the government of Assam formed by the Asom Gana Parishad (AGP) party, and the murder of social activist Sanjay Ghose by ULFA. And this last incident received wide publicity and focused attention on the deteriorating law and order condition in Assam, threatening the very survival of the Mahanta government; his previous government had been dismissed in 1990 in similar circumstances.

Before the assembly elections that brought the AGP back to power, Mahanta had visited Calcutta to raise funds for his party, and the tea companies had not responded well to the demand; Tata Tea in particular had refused to pay.

== Pranati Deka's arrest ==
On 23 August 1997, Pranati Deka, central committee member and cultural secretary of ULFA was arrested with her baby at Mumbai's Santa Cruz airport along with two accomplices. A visiting card belonging to a senior Tata Tea executive was recovered from one of the accomplices. According to the police, Brojen Gogoi, a senior manager with the Community Development and Social Welfare wing of the company, had accompanied Deka to Mumbai for child-birth, and the cost of medical treatment and lodging – amounting to INR 50,000 was paid by Tata Tea. The company said that it was not aware of Deka's identity, something Baruah confirms, and that the expenses were borne under a special medical aid scheme they had initiated in 1997 for the people of Assam.

The Assam police interrogated Tata Tea executives SS Dogra (general manager), SN Kidwai (executive director), and Krishna Kumar (managing director), and arrested Dogra "for aiding and abetting unlawful activities of the banned organisation ULFA and knowingly conniving with those who are waging a war against the state." Since Gogoi had accompanied Deka, the police were also looking for him. Gogoi had been to Harvard on a study trip and checked into a company guest house in Calcutta after returning to India on 6 September, when he came to know that he was wanted by the police, and on 11 September, shifted to Hotel Rutt Deen, where he registered under his own name. A couple of days later, Tata Tea officials became aware of an Interpol alert issued for Gogoi. On 15 September, Tata group head Ratan Tata, and Tata Tea head Krishna Kumar met Chief Minister Mahanta in Delhi, and told him that Gogoi was abroad. Noted criminal lawyer Ram Jethmalani wrote a letter to Mahanta confirming the same-

"It is true that the Managing Director Krishna Kumar and Ratan Tata, the Chairman, saw you on 15th September at Assam House (in New Delhi). They were told that Dr Brojen Gogoi was required by the police. But your Chief Secretary [V.S. Jafa] kept saying that he knew what Gogoi was doing in Chicago. Now, Gogoi had gone to Harvard for a training course which ended in August and was on leave up to 15th September. He had not reported for duty and your visitors did not know on that day that Gogoi had already arrived in India. Even if they had some inkling, they would not dare contradict your Chief Secretary who affirmed that he was in the US (and that) Interpol was after him and he would be arrested the moment he lands in India. They made no false statement to you. They stated what they honestly believed at that time. It is their subsequent discovery that Dr Gogoi was already in India and had used their guest house which was entitled to do without reporting to anyone."

On 16 September, Gogoi admitted himself into the Woodland's Nursing Home in Calcutta, and contacted Tata Tea on the 18th. He surrendered to the police on the 24th.

== The "Tata Tapes" ==
The tapes that Ritu Sarin accessed contained conversations between Nusli Wadia and many political and industrial heavyweights, and showed that the Tatas were trying to get the central government to intervene in their problems with the Assam Government. Mahanta had met the Indian Prime Minister I. K. Gujral and had complained to him about the Union Home Secretary K. Padmanabhaiah's interference in the matter. The tapes also seemed to suggest that the Tatas knew Gogoi's whereabouts (he had stayed at the company guest house before moving to a hotel and then a nursing home) and had lied to the Assam government about not knowing his location. But that was denied by the group as also Ram Jethmalani.

The identity of the persons involved in tapping Wadia's telephones remained a mystery. The Central government denied it had anything to do with it – the Intelligence Bureau works under the Home Secretary – Padmanabhaiah. He demanded a probe into the illegal phone tapping and said in a telephonic interview to the Indian Express-

"Prima-facie, I can say that we have no hand in the tapping. The Intelligence Bureau has not done it. The IB can not tap a telephone unless I permit. Therefore, the issue to be investigated is who is tapping the telephones of these private persons and why somebody is infringing on their privacy."

And the Indian government ordered a probe into the matter.

== Aftermath ==
The United Front government at the centre collapsed in November 1997, and Mahanta made peace with the tea industry but lost the state elections in 1998.

== See also ==
- Asom Gana Parishad
- ULFA
