= Saloni =

- Gender: Female
- Language: Hindi; English

Origin
- Region of origin: India

Saloni (Hindi : सलोनी) is a female name of Indian origin.

Notable people with the name include:

- Saloni (actress) (Zohra Begum; 1950–2010), Pakistani actress
- Saloni Aswani (born 1987), Indian actress and model
- Saloni Batra (born 1997), Indian actress
- Saloni Chopra (born 1991), Indian-born Australian actor and model
- Saloni Daini (born 2001), Indian actress and comedian
- Saloni Gaur (born 1999), Indian comedian and impressionist
- Saloni Malhotra, Indian businesswoman
