= N. Biren Singh ministry =

N. Biren Singh ministry may refer to these cabinets of Manipur, India headed by N. Biren Singh as chief minister:

- First N. Biren Singh ministry (2017–2022)
- Second N. Biren Singh ministry (2022–2025)

== See also ==
- Biren Singh (disambiguation)
- Manmohan Singh ministry (disambiguation)
