= Biren Singh (disambiguation) =

N. Biren Singh (born 1961) is an Indian politician and footballer.

Biren Singh may also refer to:

- Kshetrimayum Biren Singh (fl. from 2017), Indian politician
- Biren Sing Engti (born 1945), Indian politician

== See also ==
- N. Biren Singh ministry (disambiguation)
- Bijen Singh (born 1979), Indian footballer
