= Dynamatic Technologies =

Indian precision engineering company

Dynamatic® Technologies Limited
- Company type: Public
- Traded as: NSE: DYNAMATECH; BSE: 505242
- Industry: Aerospace, Automotive, Hydraulics, Security
- Headquarters: Bangalore, India
- Key people: Udayant Malhoutra (CEO & Managing Director)
- Divisions: Dynamatic Hydraulics, Dynamatic-Oldland Aerospace, JKM Ferrotech Limited
- Subsidiaries: JKM Research Farm Limited, JKM Global PTE Limited, JKM Wind Farm, Eisenwerk Erla GmbH, Dynamatic US LLC
- Website: dynamatics.com

Dynamatic Technologies is an Indian precision engineering company, based in Bangalore. The company is a global supplier of parts to aerospace, automotive, hydraulic and security assemblers. Udayant Malhoutra is the CEO & Managing Director of the company.

== History ==
Dynamatic Technologies was incorporated in 1973 as a manufacturer of hydraulic pumps. In the 1990s, it expanded to aerospace grade components and aircraft assemblies. In the early 2000s, the company tied up with Hindustan Aeronautics Limited (HAL) and was involved in fabrication and assembly of HAL's subsonic intermediate training jets. It started making body parts for the Sukhoi Su-30MKI and the Lakshya jets. It then began supplying flap track beams to Airbus for its A320 family of aircraft and the wide-body 330 aircraft. This followed part contracts with Boeing for Boeing CH-47 Chinook and Bell Textron for Bell 407 helicopters. Dynamatic soon became the supplier of flap track beam assemblies for all of Airbus' single-aisle aircraft and Boeing's P-8 maritime aircraft for Indian, US and Australian navies. In September 2021, Dynamatic Technologies awarded a contract for manufacturing Aerostructure Assemblies for the Boeing F-15EX Eagle II fighter aircraft.

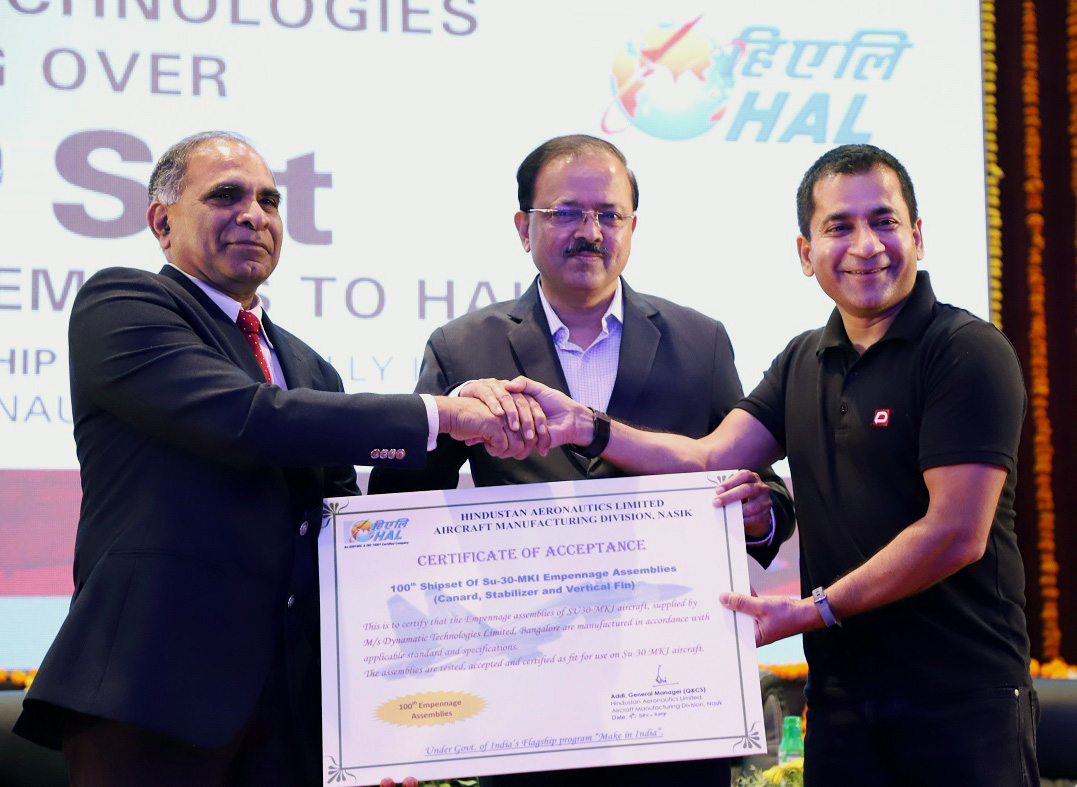
CEO Udayant Malhoutra handing over the 100th set of Su-30MKI assemblies to HAL

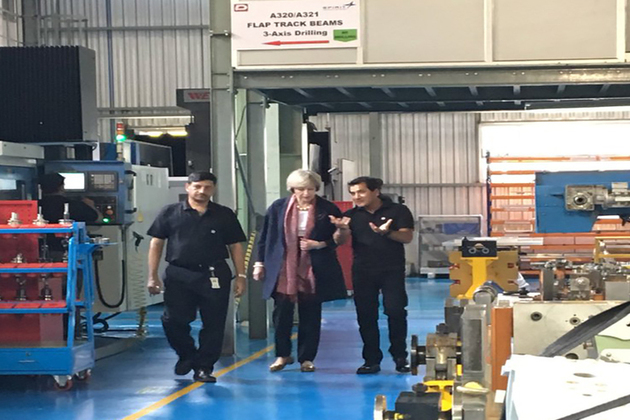
UK Prime Minister Theresa May during her visit to Dynamatic's manufacturing unit at Bangalore

== Acquisitions ==
- In 2008, Dynamatic acquired the British aerospace parts manufacturing company Oldland CNC for US$16 million.
- In 2011, Dynamatic acquired German automotive component manufacturer Eisenwerke Erla GmbH.

== See also ==
- Automotive industry in India
