= Manmohan Singh ministry =

Manmohan Singh ministry may refer to:

- First Manmohan Singh ministry, the Indian government headed by Manmohan Singh from 2004 to 2009
  - 2008 vote of confidence in the Manmohan Singh ministry
- Second Manmohan Singh ministry, the Indian government headed by Manmohan Singh from 2009 to 2014

== See also ==
- Manmohan Singh (disambiguation)
- N. Biren Singh ministry (disambiguation)
- Charan Singh ministry (1979–1980), of Indian prime minister Charan Singh
- Chandra Shekhar Singh ministry (1990-1991), of Indian prime minister Chandra Shekhar Singh
- V. P. Singh ministry (1989–1990), of Indian prime minister V. P. Singh
