= Manmohan =

Manmohan means 'Winner of the heart'. It is another name of Krishna, the Hindu deity, an avatar (incarnation) of Vishnu. Manmohan may also refer to:

- Man Mohan Adhikari (1920–1999), former Prime Minister of Nepal
- Manmohan (actor) (1933–1979), Indian actor
- Manmohan Acharya (1967–2013), poet and lyricist from India
- Manmohan Desai (1937–1994), producer and director of Indian movies
- Manmohan Ghose (1869–1924), poet, one of the first from India to write poetry in English
- Manmohan Krishna (1922–1990), actor in Hindi cinema, credited as Manmohan
- Manmohan Mahapatra (1951–2020), Oriya filmmaker, director, producer and writer
- Manmohan Malhoutra, Indian former diplomat and Assistant Secretary-General of the Commonwealth of Nations
- Manmohan Shetty, known as the 'man with a midas touch' in Indian film industry
- Manmohan Singh (1932–2024), the 13th Prime Minister of India
- Manmohan Singh (director), director of Punjabi films
- Man Mohan Singh (pilot) (1905–1942), also spelled Manmohan Singh, Indian aircraft pilot
- Manmohan Waris (born 1967), award-winning Indian Punjabi folk/pop singer
- Manmohan (film)
- Manmohan (judge), Indian judge

== See also ==
- Communist Party of Nepal (Manmohan)
- Dr Manmohan Singh Scholarship
