= K. Padmanabhaiah =

Indian civil servant

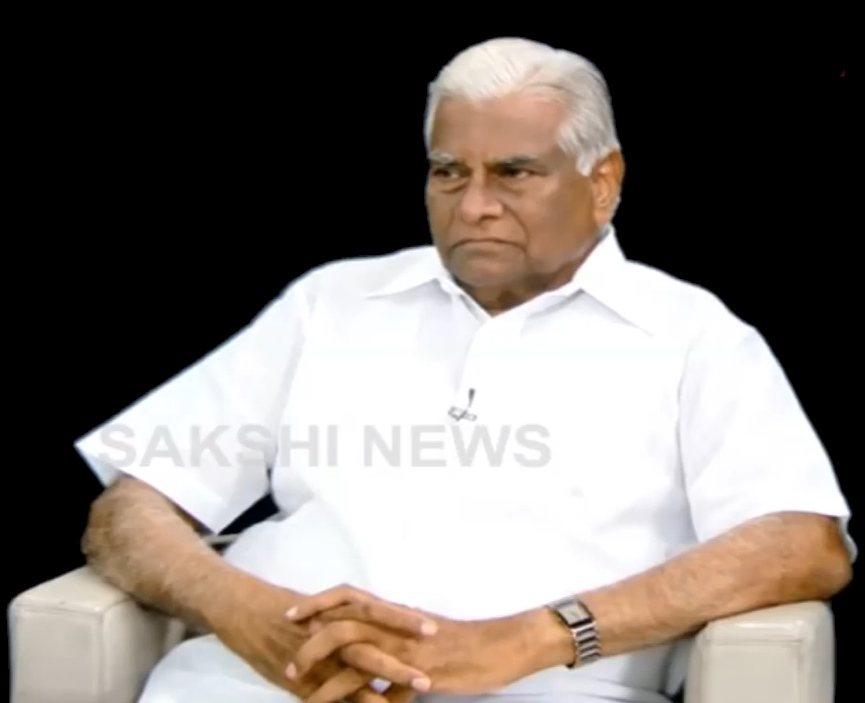
- K. Padmanabhaiah in 2018
- Born: 6 October 1938 (age 87); Krishna District, Andhra Pradesh, India
- Occupation: Civil servant
- Known for: Indian Administrative Service
- Awards: Padma Bhushan; Giants International Award; Indira Gandhi Award for National Integration; Shiromani Award
- Website: Website

K. Padmanabhaiah (born 1938) is a retired Indian civil servant and a former Home Secretary of India. He is the chairman of the Court of Governors of the Administrative Staff College of India (ASCI), and has headed many government committees such as the Committee on Police Reforms (2000), the Committee on Reorganization of the Services Selection Board, and the committee to Review the working of National Institute of Urban Management. The Government of India awarded him the third highest civilian honour of the Padma Bhushan, in 2008, for his contributions to Indian civil service.

== Biography ==
K. Padmanabhaiah was born on 6 October 1938 in a small hamlet in Krishna district, in the Indian state of Andhra Pradesh. After securing a master's degree in Science (MSc) from Andhra University under Calamur Mahadevan and a master's degree in Financial Management from Jamnalal Bajaj Institute of Management Studies, he entered the Indian Administrative Service from Maharashtra cadre in 1961. His first major position came in 1970 when he was appointed as the Director of Sugar Co-Operatives in Maharashtra and during the four years he stayed in the position, the sugar industry was reported to have recorded considerable growth. In 1975, he was moved to Nashik as the District Collector which coincided with the Emergency period and under his leadership, the district was adjudged as one of the best performers of the 20 point economic programme of Indira Gandhi, the then Prime Minister of India. In 1982, he was appointed as the joint secretary at the Ministry of Petroleum and Natural Gas, but moved to the Ministry of Power in 1984 where he worked for another two years. The next move was to London, as the minister of economy at the High Commission of India to the United Kingdom for a three-year stint. Returning to India, he served as the Municipal Commissioner of Greater Mumbai during 1990-91 period, followed by a move to the Ministry of Urban Development in 1993. The next year, he took over the post of the government secretary at the Ministry of Civil Aviation, simultaneously holding the chair of Air India and Indian Airlines, the two national airlines of India. In 1994, he was posted as the Union Secretary of the Ministry of Home Affairs, with additional responsibility as the secretary of Jammu and Kashmir Affairs. He worked holding the posts past his statutory superannuation in October 1996, earning an extension till 1997.

When Sri Chaitanya Educational Institutions (SCEI) established an IAS Academy in 2011 to train aspiring civil service officers, Padmanabhaiah was appointed as the dean of the institution, assisting T. N. Seshan, a former Chief Election Commissioner of India, who held the chair. After four years of service, he moved to the ASCI as the chairman of the Court of Governors of the institute, succeeding S. M. Datta, and holds the post till date.

== Padmanabhaiah Committees ==
During his civil service years, Padmanabhaiah headed several government committees, the first of which was during his tenure as the secretary at the Ministry of Urban Development in 1993. In the wake of 1993 Latur earthquake which left 100,000 people dead and over 30,000 injured, and its devastation in the states of Maharashtra and Karnataka, the Government of India appointed an Advisory Committee of International Experts under his chairmanship to study the losses and advise on rehabilitation of affected people and reconstruction of the infrastructure. Subsequently, the reconstruction and rehabilitation was carried out with the assistance from World Bank, and the report submitted by the Padmanabhaiah Committee served as guidelines for the disaster management efforts.

After his retirement from civil service, Padmanabhaiah headed the Committee on Police Reforms set up by the Government of India to study the functional capabilities of Indian Police Service and propose reorganization measures to revamp the force. The committee studied, among others, three major areas viz. Politicisation and Criminalisation of Police, Control over Police and Accountability of Police and proposed various reform measures including the replacement of Indian Police Act of 1861 which was later taken up by the Union Government which set up a committee under the leadership of Soli Sorabjee to prepare the draft for the new Police Act and by a number of state governments.

Prior to assuming the chair of the Police Reforms Committee, Padmanabhaiah had a stint as the Government representative for the settlement of Ethnic conflict in Nagaland in 1997. During his service as the representative which lasted till his resignation in 2009, he is reported to have assisted in maintaining the cease-fire agreement as well as the dialogue with the insurgents. He later served as the chairman of two more committees, the Committee on Reorganization of the Services Selection Board, and the committee to Review the working of National Institute of Urban Management.

== Awards and honors ==
His services as the Municipal Commissioner of Mumbai earned him the Giants International Award in 1991. In 1996, he received two awards, the Indira Gandhi Award for National Integration and the Shiromani Award of the Shiromani Institute, Delhi for contributions to National Development, Integration and Enrichment of Life. The Government of India awarded him the civilian honor of the Padma Bhushan in 2008.

== See also ==
- Indian Police Service
- Tata Tapes controversy
