= Mehrotra =

Mehrotra (IPA: [meːɦɾoːt̪raː]) is a Khatri surname.

== Origin ==
It is an extended version of Mehra, derived from Mihir, which means sun, or it may mean chief or master. Malhotra is a modified form of Mehrotra.

== Notable people ==
Notable people with the surname, who may or may not be affiliated with caste include:

- Arvind Krishna Mehrotra (born 1947), Indian poet
- Ashley Mehrotra (born 1969), New Zealand cricket umpire
- Harish-Chandra Mehrotra (1923–1983), Indian American mathematician
- Jaideep Mehrotra (born 1954), Indian artist
- Manish Mehrotra (born 1974), Indian chef
- Prakash Mehrotra (1925–1988), Indian politician
- Rahul Mehrotra, Indian architect and urban planner
- Rajiv Mehrotra, Indian writer and documentary filmmaker
- Ram Charan Mehrotra (1922–2004), Indian chemist and academic
- Ravidas Mehrotra (born 1955), Indian politician
- Sanjay Mehrotra (born 1958), Indian-born American businessman
- Santosh Mehrotra (born 1955), Indian economist
- Shashi Mehrotra, victim of the Zin Mar Nwe case
- S. R. Mehrotra (1931–2019), Indian historian
- Tulika Mehrotra, American writer and journalist
- Vishal Mehrotra (1972–1981), murdered British Indian child

== See also ==
- Mehrotra predictor–corrector method, 1989 optimization algorithm
