= Bharat Mehra =

India-born American library school educator

- Education: Ph.D.
- Alma mater: School of Information Sciences (University of Illinois Urbana-Champaign), University of Illinois Urbana-Champaign

Bharat Mehra is the EBSCO Endowed Chair in Social Justice and professor in the School of Library and Information Studies at the University of Alabama, USA. He is an India-born American library school educator, known for his theoretical and action research, and is author of the Social Justice Laws of Librarianship, which extends Shiyali Ramamrita Ranganathan's Five Laws of Library Science to address contemporary inequities. Since January 2021, Mehra has been the Series Editor of Advances in Librarianship.

== Education and career ==
Mehra received his PhD in library and information science from the University of Illinois School of Information Sciences in 2004. He also earned an M.A. in South Asian and Middle Eastern studies (1999) and an MLA in landscape architecture from the University of Illinois Urbana-Champaign and a B.A. in architecture from the School of Planning and Architecture in New Delhi, India.

His academic experience includes being an assistant professor (2005–2011) and associate professor (2011–2018) at the School of Information Sciences, University of Tennessee, Knoxville. Since January 2019, he has been the EBSCO Endowed Chair in Social Justice and professor, at the School of Library and Information Studies, University of Alabama.

Mehra was one of three people, along with Donna and George Hoemann, who made the proposal for the Commission for LGBT People at the University of Tennessee, resulting in the creation of the university's first commission for LGBTQ+ communities. Mehra's personal story as a nonwhite gay man in academia is also available in an oral interview.

== Awards ==
- 2024. Best JASIST Paper Award. Journal of the Association for Information Science and Technology “Don't Say Gay” in Alabama: A taxonomic framework of LGBTQ+ information support services in public libraries—An exploratory website content analysis of critical resistance.” Bharat Mehra and Baheya S. Jaber.
- Association for Library and Information Science Education (ALISE)- 2018 Connie Van Fleet Award for Research Excellence in Public Library Services to Adults.

== Published books ==
- Irvin, V., and Mehra, B. (2024). Reading Workplace Dynamics: A Post-Pandemic Professional Ethos in Public Libraries. (Advances in Librarianship, Volume 55). Bingley, United Kingdom.: Emerald Publishing.
- Nichols, J., and Mehra, B. (2024). Data Curation and Information Systems Design from Australasia: Implications for Cataloguing of Vernacular Knowledge in Galleries, Libraries, Archives and Museums. (Advances in Librarianship, Volume 54) Bingley, United Kingdom: Emerald Publishing.
- Williams-Cockfield, K. C., and Mehra, B. (2023). How Public Libraries Build Sustainable Communities in the 21st Century. (Advances in Librarianship, Volume 53) Bingley, United Kingdom: Emerald Publishing.
- Black, K, and Mehra, B. (2023). How Public Libraries Build Sustainable Communities in the 21st Century. (Advances in Librarianship, Volume 52) Bingley, United Kingdom: Emerald Publishing.
- Mehra, B. (2022). Social Justice Design and Implementation in Library and Information Science. Abingdon, United Kingdom: Routledge.
- Lopez, M. Elena, Mehra, B., and Caspse, M. (2022). A Librarian’s Guide to Engaging Families in Learning. Santa Barbara, CA: Libraries Unlimited.
- Mehra, B. (2019). LGBTQ+ Librarianship in the 21st Century: Emerging Directions of Advocacy and Community Engagement in Diverse Information Environments (Advances in Librarianship, Vol. 45). Bingley, United Kingdom: Emerald Publishing.
- Mehra, B., and Dessel, A. (2017). Library, Information and Society. New York: Magnum Publishing.
- Mehra, B., and Rioux, K. (2016). Progressive Community Action: Critical Theory and Social Justice in Library and Information Science. Sacramento, CA: Library Juice Press.
- Mehra, B. (2008). The Cross-Cultural Learning Process of International Doctoral Students: A Case Study in Library and Information Science Education. Saarbrucken, Germany: Verlag Dr. Muller.
