= Udayant Malhoutra =

Indian entrepreneur

- Spouse: Pramilla Malhoutra
- Children: Dushyant Malhoutra & Ahilya Malhoutra
- Parent(s): Jayant Malhoutra & Barota Malhoutra
- Family: Malhoutra
- Website: www.malhoutra.com

Udayant Malhoutra is the CEO & Managing Director of Dynamatic Technologies Limited, an engineering and manufacturing company which caters to Hydraulic Pump, Aerospace and Automotive industries.

He is the Chairman of the National Sector Skills Council for Strategic Manufacturing, and has recently been appointed Chairman of the new National Institute of Design, Amravathi/Vijaywada. He is a member of CII National Council, and has chaired the CII National Committees on Design and Technology. He has also served on the Board of Governors, IIT Kanpur.

He is an active member of the Young Presidents’ Organization (YPO), having served as Chairman, India & South Asian Area 2002 -2004 and as a member of the International Board of Directors from 2006-2009.
