= Om Prakash Malhotra (advocate) =

Former Senior Counsel in the Supreme Court of India

- Died: 31 January 2013
- Occupation: Lawyer
- Children: Indu Malhotra

Om Prakash Malhotra also known as O.P. Malhotra (died 2013) was a Senior Advocate in the Supreme Court of India, and a distinguished author who brought out the treatise on the Law of Industrial Disputes and authored commentary on the Law & Practice of Arbitration and Conciliation.

== Personal life ==
Om Prakash Malhotra had his degree education in Lahore University of Punjab and completed his degree in law from Government Law College, Bangalore. His daughter Indu Malhotra is a former Judge of the Supreme Court of India. He died on 31 January 2013.

== Career ==
Malhotra started his law career started in Bangalore High Court and later practiced in both the Delhi High court and Supreme Court.

== Books ==
- The Law of Industrial Disputes, Volume 1

He published six editions of this commentary which received wide acclaim.

- The Law and Practice of Arbitration and Conciliation: The Arbitration and Conciliation Act, 1996
