= Navin Khanna =

Indian researcher and scientist

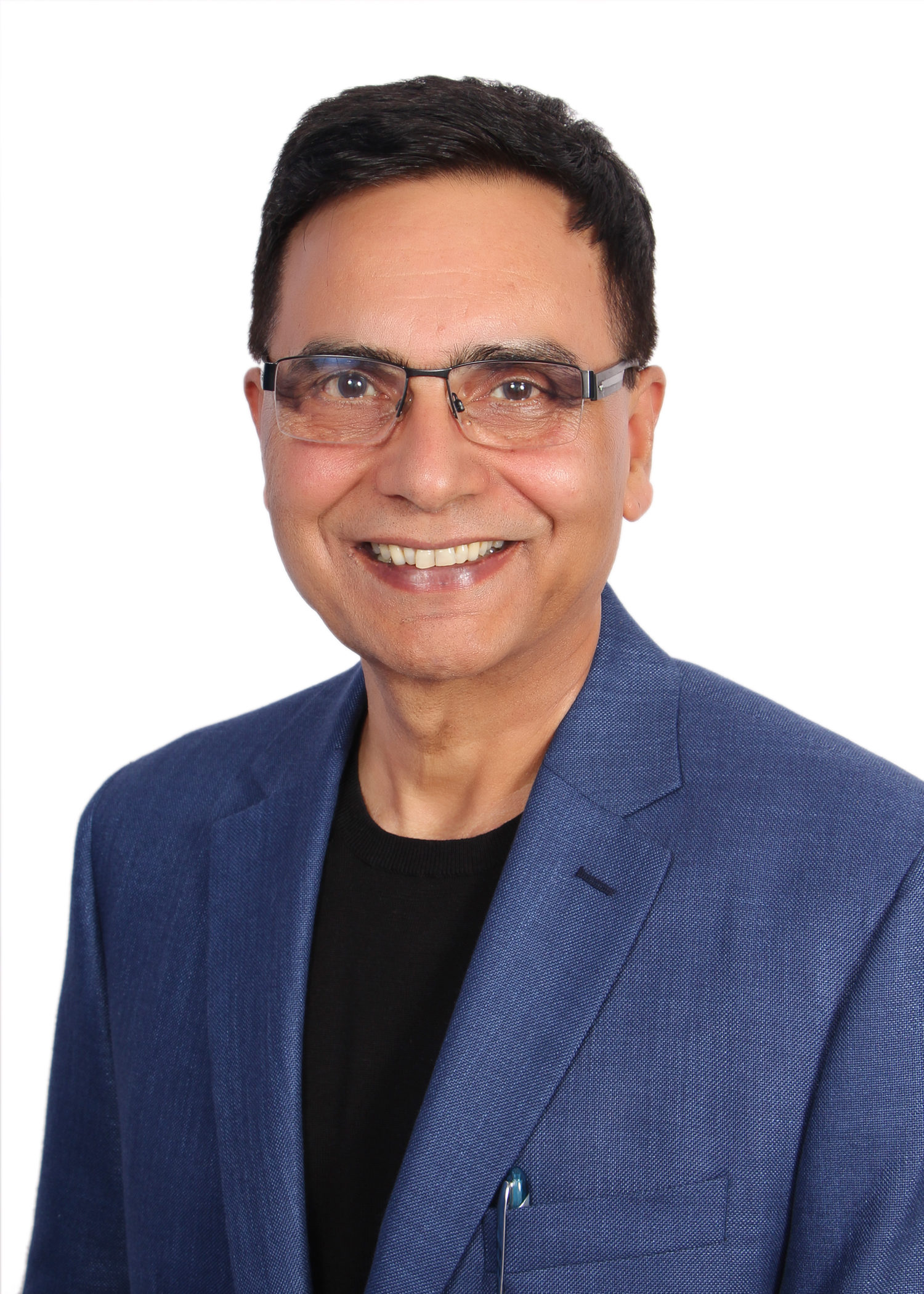
- Education: University of Lucknow; All India Institute of Medical Sciences, New Delhi
- Awards: Padma Shri
- Scientific career
- Fields: Biotechnology, molecular biology, and diagnostics
- Workplaces: University of California San Diego; University of California, Irvine; International Centre for Genetic Engineering and Biotechnology

Navin Khanna is an Indian researcher and scientist known for his work on diagnostic kits for viral infections, including dengue, HIV, hepatitis C (HCV), and hepatitis B (HBV). In 2020, he was awarded the Padma Shri, India's fourth-highest civilian honor, for his contributions to science and engineering.

== Education ==
Navin Khanna completed his Master of Science (MSc) in Biochemistry at the University of Lucknow. He then pursued a Doctor of Philosophy (PhD) in Biochemistry from the All India Institute of Medical Sciences (AIIMS) in New Delhi.

== Career ==
Khanna began his academic career in 1983 as an Alberta Heritage Foundation Fellow at the Cell Regulation Group, University of Calgary, Alberta, Canada, where he worked until 1987. He later held a position as a Postgraduate Research Biologist at the Centre for Molecular Genetics, University of California, San Diego, from 1987 to 1989. From 1989 to 1990, Khanna served as a Research Assistant Professor in the Department of Biochemistry and Molecular Biology at the University of California, Irvine.

In 1990, Khanna joined the International Centre for Genetic Engineering and Biotechnology (ICGEB), New Delhi, as a Senior Research Scientist. He continued his work at ICGEB, leading the Recombinant Gene Products Laboratory from 1994 until 2022.

== Research ==
Khanna led the Recombinant Gene Products laboratory at ICGEB for over 25 years, where he focused on developing genetically engineered biomolecules for medical applications. Khanna and his team developed the Dengue Day 1 Test kit, which became a significant advancement in early dengue diagnosis, it was developed in collaboration with J. Mitra & Co., which detects dengue infection within 15 minutes from the onset of fever.

His team also contributed to the production of Hepatitis B vaccines and recombinant human insulin.

Khanna has worked on developing a dengue vaccine, receiving support from the Indo-US Vaccine Action Program, Wellcome Trust, National Biopharma Mission, and other organizations.

At the International Centre for Genetic Engineering and Biotechnology (ICGEB), Khanna's team developed technologies that led to the commercialization of over 20 diagnostic kits. These include point-of-care tests for viral infections such as Dengue, HIV, Hepatitis C (HCV), and Hepatitis B (HBV). The diagnostic kits, known for their affordability and efficacy, have been utilized in several developing countries.

== Awards and honors ==
Khanna received the VASVIK Industrial Research Award in Biological Science and Technology in 2007. In 2011, he was awarded the Biotech Commercialization Award by the Department of Biotechnology, Government of India. The following year, he received the Ranbaxy Research Award in Pharmaceutical Sciences from the Ranbaxy Science Foundation. In 2013, Khanna was honored with the Om Prakash Bhasin Foundation Award in Biotechnology.

In 2015, he was recognized as a Fellow of the National Academy of Sciences and received the Scientist Award from the Organization of Pharmaceutical Producers of India. The following year, he was elected as a Fellow of the Indian Academy of Sciences, and in 2017, he became a Fellow of the Indian National Science Academy. Also in 2017, he was awarded the Anjani Mashelkar Inclusive Innovation Award. In 2020, he was honored with the Padma Shri, India's fourth-highest civilian award, in the Science and Engineering category, in recognition of his efforts to translate laboratory research into socially beneficial products.

== Selected bibliography ==
- Ramasamy, Viswanathan; Arora, Upasana; Shukla, Rahul; Poddar, Ankur; Shanmugam, Rajgokul K.; White, Laura J.; Mattocks, Melissa M.; Raut, Rajendra; Perween, Ashiya; Tyagi, Poornima; de Silva, Aravinda M.; Bhaumik, Siddhartha K.; Kaja, Murali Krishna; Villinger, François; Ahmed, Rafi; Johnston, Robert E.; Swaminathan, Sathyamangalam; Khanna, Navin (8 Jan 2018). "A tetravalent virus-like particle vaccine designed to display domain III of dengue envelope proteins induces multi-serotype neutralizing antibodies in mice and macaques which confer protection against antibody dependent enhancement in AG129 mice". PLOS Neglected Tropical Diseases. 12 (1) e0006191. Public Library of Science (PLoS). doi:10.1371/journal.pntd.0006191. ISSN 1935-2735. PMC 5774828. PMID 29309412.
- Shukla, Rahul; Ramasamy, Viswanathan; Shanmugam, Rajgokul K.; Ahuja, Richa; Khanna, Navin (22 October 2020). "Antibody-Dependent Enhancement: A Challenge for Developing a Safe Dengue Vaccine". Frontiers in Cellular and Infection Microbiology. 10. Frontiers Media SA. doi:10.3389/fcimb.2020.572681. ISSN 2235-2988. PMC 7642463. PMID 33194810.
- Shukla, Rahul; Shanmugam, Rajgokul K.; Ramasamy, Viswanathan; Arora, Upasana; Batra, Gaurav; Acklin, Joshua A.; Krammer, Florian; Lim, Jean K.; Swaminathan, Sathyamangalam; Khanna, Navin (2020). "Zika virus envelope nanoparticle antibodies protect mice without risk of disease enhancement". eBioMedicine. 54 102738. Elsevier BV. doi:10.1016/j.ebiom.2020.102738. ISSN 2352-3964. PMC 7186774. PMID 32305868.
