= Dinesh Khanna (director) =

Indian theatre director

Prof.Dinesh Khanna, Former NSD Director Former BNA, Director Currently He is Director of Geeta Shodh Sansthan, Rasaleela Academy, Vrindavan.
- Born: 19 February 1960 (age 66); Uttar Pradesh, India
- Education: National School of Drama
- Occupations: Theatre Director, Actor.
- Organization(s): Pahchan Dramatic Art, New Delhi

Dinesh Khanna is an Indian theatre director and acting teacher at the National School of Drama. He is known for his productions based on The Boring Story written by Anton Chekhov, Dedh Inch Oopar, Zindagi Yahan, Subah ki Sair, aur Wahan by Nirmal Verma, and Rasapriya by Phanishwarnath Renu.

== Early life ==
He was born in Uttar Pradesh into a Hindu family. He earned a scholarship to study at National School of Drama in New Delhi in 1986. where he obtained his Diploma specializing in Acting.

== Books ==
- Abhinay Chintan
- Kuchh Aansu Kuchh Phool : Jai Shankar ‘Sudnari

== Major directions ==
Play	Writer	Director
Jim Morrison : an Unknown Soldier	Dinesh Khanna	Dinesh Khanna
Ek Ziddi Ladki	Vijay Tendulkar	Dinesh Khanna
Pancchi Aise Aate Hain	Vijay Tendulkar	Dinesh Khanna
