= Paul Khanna =

British actor

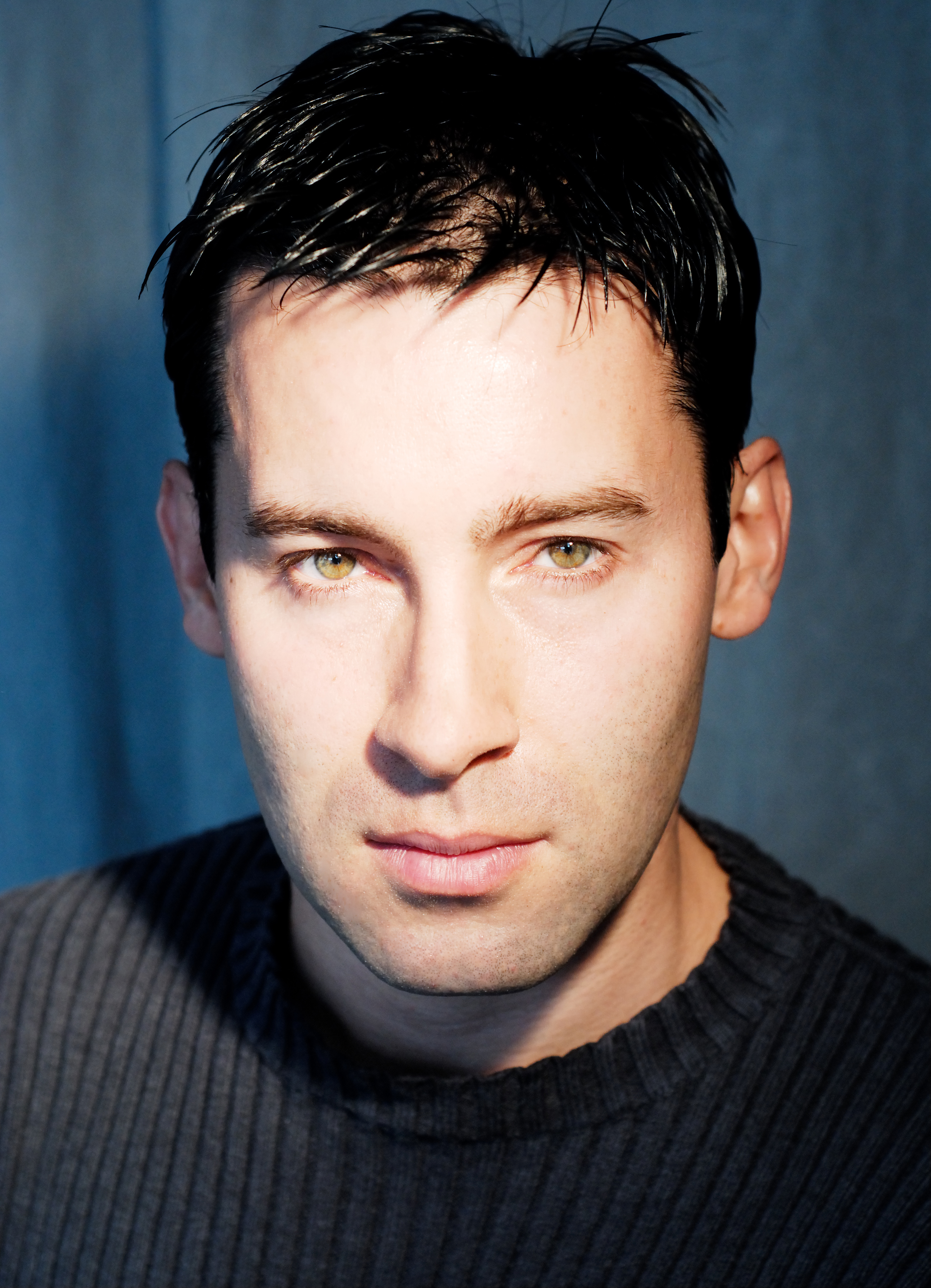
Paul Khanna

Paul Khanna is a British actor in the two-part Warner Bros. film Harry Potter and the Deathly Hallows.

== Harry Potter and the Deathly Hallows ==
A first audition left the actor feeling disappointed by his own performance. Going against the advice of industry professionals he recorded a home video clip and took it to the offices of casting director Fiona Weir. 5 months later he was chosen for the part.

Appears in the official Warner Bros teaser trailer.

== Big Tingz ==
In the summer of 2009, he auditioned for a role in the UK Film Council funded film Big Tingz. At this time he had already recorded a home audition for Harry Potter and the Deathly Hallows but was yet to be confirmed. He recorded another such clip for the director and producer of Big Tingz who offered him the part of Kevin, a role based on a real person (who had earlier auditioned to play themselves). The director noted that he gave a performance "more Kevin than Kevin". The film premiered at BAFTA later that year.

== Superman Requiem ==
In summer 2011, the actor played Alex Luthor in the fan film Superman: Requiem.

== Filmography ==
- Harry Potter and the Deathly Hallows (2010) - Death Eater
- Superman: Requiem (2011) - Alex Luthor
