= Advances in Librarianship =

- Discipline: Library and information science
- Language: English
- Edited by: Paul T. Jaeger

Publication details
- History: 1970-present
- Publisher: Emerald Group Publishing
- Frequency: Annual

Standard abbreviations
- ISO 4: Adv. Librariansh.

Indexing
- ISSN: 0065-2830

Links
- Journal homepage

Advances in Librarianship is a peer-reviewed academic journal covering research and developments in library and information science. It was founded in 1970, and in 1999, it also began being published online by Emerald Group.

The debut issue in 1970, edited by Melvin J. Voight, was praised by Estelle Brodman from the Bulletin of the Medical Library Association, and also by Frederick Wezeman from The Library Quarterly, who called it "an auspicious beginning" to a journal which he hoped would continue.
