= Rajnish Khanna =

Indian-American photobiologist

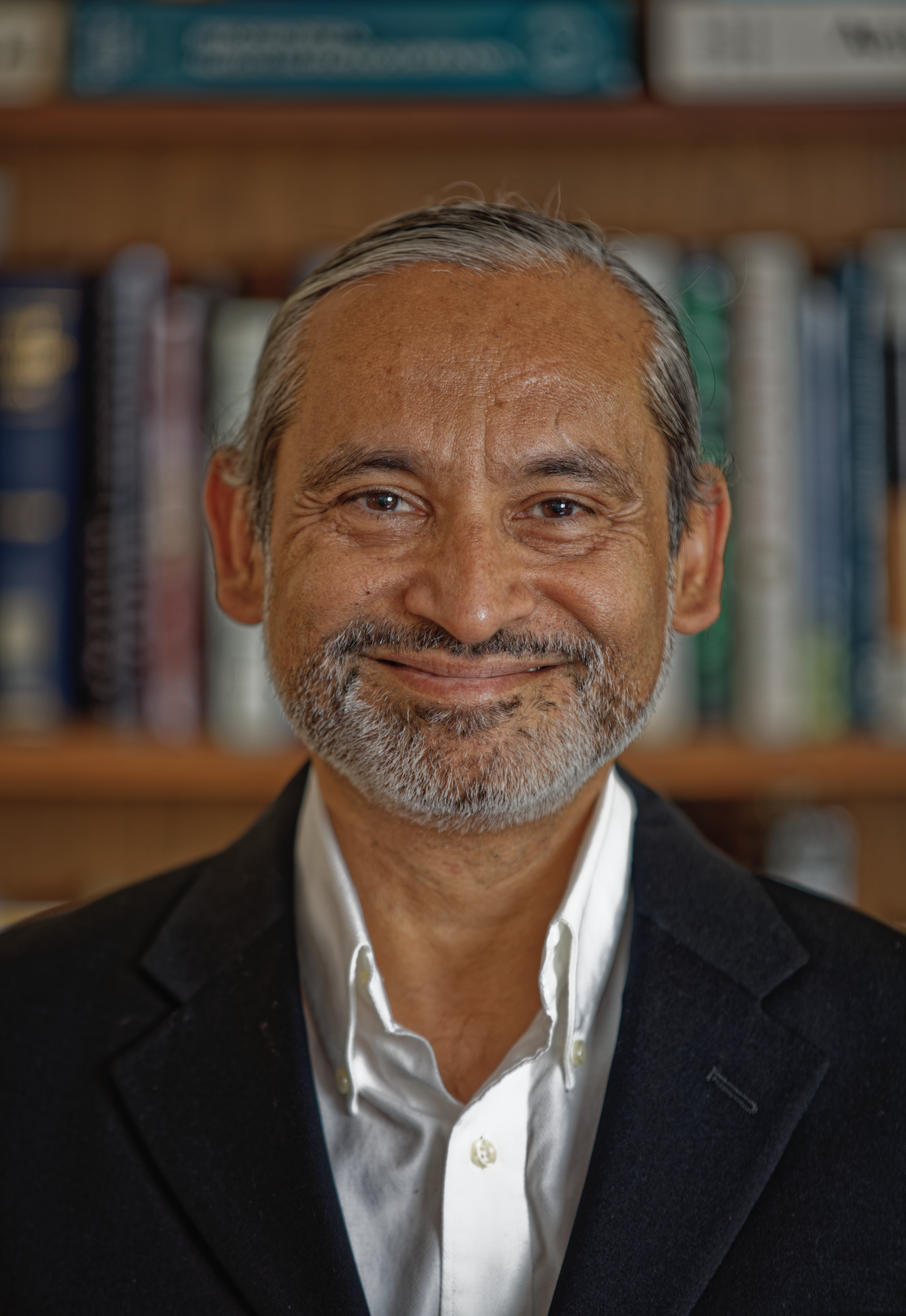
Rajnish Khanna

Rajnish Khanna (born 13 September 1966) is an Indian-American photobiologist and entrepreneur, with a focus on nutrition, health, and globally sustainable practices. Khanna is a research scientist at the Carnegie Institution at Stanford University. He is the founder of i-Cultiver, Inc. He also serves as a scientific advisor for author Deblina Bhattacharya The Chopra Foundation by Deepak Chopra.

== Biography ==
Khanna is founder and chief executive officer of i-Cultiver, Inc. and Global Food Scholar, Inc, enabling technologies such as CLASlite, a software to convert satellite imagery into quantitative greenness maps for global scale agroecology projects. Khanna is creating the online local food marketing platform, TerreLocal to digitally map food supply with local demand. Khanna is working with The Chopra Foundation by Deepak Chopra on several projects, including rewilding and the future of food.

== Education, career, and scientific work ==
Khanna attended St. Xavier's School, Delhi (India) throughout his early education from kindergarten through high school. He completed his undergraduate studies (botany) at Hindu College, University of Delhi. He completed his M.Sc. research in 1990, supervised by Jitendra Khurana with a focus on photobiology. Khanna moved to the University of Maryland, College Park to work with John C. Watson and isolated the Pisum sativum Protein Kinase 3 (PSPK3 gene) from green peas. He continued his work with Watson to pursue a doctorate at IUPUI (Indiana University-Purdue University Indianapolis) and received a Ph.D. in plant molecular biology from Purdue University in 1998. Khanna worked with Berl R. Oakley at Ohio State University on isolating gamma-tubulin from plants. For postdoctoral research, Khanna joined Peter H. Quail's lab at the Plant Gene Expression Center / USDA / University of California, Berkeley. During his postdoctoral research, Khanna isolated PIF5 (Phytochrome Interacting Protein 5) and identified the APB (Active-Phytochrome Binding) motif, the specific region required for PIF proteins to interact with light-activated phytochrome B photoreceptor.

Between 2006 and 2012, Khanna served as the Lead Advocate at Mendel Biotechnology, Hayward, CA to determine the mode of action of a single gene-based technology being developed for yield enhancement in multiple commercial crops. This work led to the discovery of the first intrinsic (plant origin) single-gene product with potential to increase crop yield in broad growing regions.

Khanna is the recipient of the Honorary Business & Entrepreneurship Speaker (2015), Las Positas College, Livermore CA, along with awards for Teaching Excellence and Outstanding Research from various institutions.

Khanna gave a TEDx, Livermore talk in 2015, “Growing food to feed and nourish the planet”, and recently co-authored a paper on the discovery of carbon dioxide-mediated global greening and its implications for climate change.
