= Indu Malhotra =

Indian judge (born 1956)

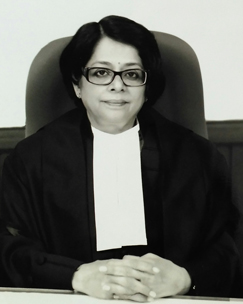

Judge of the Supreme Court of India
- In office 27 April 2018 – 13 March 2021
- Nominated by: Dipak Misra
- Appointed by: Ram Nath Kovind

Personal details
- Born: 14 March 1956 (age 70) Bangalore, Mysore State, India
- Education: Campus Law Centre, Faculty of Law, University of Delhi

Indu Malhotra is a former judge of the Supreme Court of India. Post retirement, she is practicing as a full-time arbitrator in international and domestic arbitrations. Prior to her elevation, she was practicing as a Senior Counsel in the Supreme Court of India, and various High Courts. In 2007, she was the second woman to be designated as a Senior Counsel by the Supreme Court, after more than three decades. In 2018, she was the first woman to be elevated directly from the Bar as a Judge of the Supreme Court of India. She demitted office in March 2021 on completion of her term. She has contributed significantly to arbitration jurisprudence, both as a counsel and as a judge.

She is currently a Member of the Court, Permanent Court of Arbitration (PCA), The Hague.

She is also a Fellow of the Chartered Institute of Arbitrators, London.

Recently, V. Mohana, a Senior advocate practising in Supreme Court of India, had been elevated as a Judge of the Supreme Court. Justice Mohana, who practised with Justice Malhotra, became only the second woman after Justice Indu Malhotra, in the Supreme Court’s history to be directly elevated from the Bar.

== Early life and education ==
Indu Malhotra is the daughter of Late Sh. Om Prakash Malhotra, a senior advocate of the Supreme Court and author, and Satya Malhotra.

She did her schooling from Carmel Convent School, New Delhi, Thereafter, she did her Bachelors and Masters in Political Science from Lady Shri Ram College, Delhi University. After obtaining her Masters Degree, she worked briefly as a lecturer in Political Science at Miranda House and Vivekananda College, Delhi University.

In 1982, she completed her Law Degree (LL.B.) from the Faculty of Law, University of Delhi and enrolled with the Bar Council of Delhi and took to the practice of Law as her profession.

== Career ==
She qualified as an advocate-on-record in the Supreme Court, and topped the examination in 1988, and was awarded the Mukesh Goswami Award.

In 2017, Justice Malhotra was appointed as a member of a High-Level Committee constituted by The Ministry of Law and Justice, Government of India to make recommendations for institutionalization of arbitration in India, and suggest further legislative amendments to the Arbitration and Conciliation Act, 1996. The 2019 Amendments to the Indian Arbitration & Conciliation Act, 1996 are based on the recommendations of this Committee.

She has been appointed as an arbitrator by various arbitral institutions including the ICC International Court of Arbitration, Mumbai Centre for International Arbitration (MCIA), Singapore International Arbitration Centre (SIAC), Indian Council of Arbitration (ICA), Delhi International Arbitration Centre (DIAC), and Associated Chambers of Commerce and Industry of India (ASSOCHAM).

She is regularly invited to lecture on the law and practice of arbitration by institutions such as Delhi University, National Law University in Delhi, National Academy of Legal Studies and Research (NALSAR) in Hyderabad, Gujarat National Law University in Ahmedabad, ILS Law College in Pune, Symbiosis Law School, and Amity University in New Delhi.

Apart from her judicial career, she has been deeply engaged in academia. She has authored the 3rd and 4th edition of the well-known Commentary on the Arbitration Act, which has been cited by the Supreme Court and the High Courts in various judgments.

In 2005, she was nominated in the category of ‘eminent person’ by the then Chief Justice of India to the General Council of Gujarat National Law University.

In June 2023, Justice Malhotra was nominated by the Chief Justice of India as the Chairperson of the Advisory Board of the Consortium of National Law Universities in India.

In 2024, Justice Malhotra has established a Chair to conduct the 1st Post Graduate Diploma Course on International Commercial Arbitration & Investment Treaty Arbitration in the National Law University of Delhi. The object of conducting this course is for capacity building in this specialized area of arbitration.

She is also engaged in public service and is actively involved as a Trustee of the Save Life Foundation (“SLF”) which is a public charitable trust. SLF has pioneered various initiatives for improving road safety and emergency medical care to address the issue of the high number of fatalities caused by road crashes in India. SLF has also filed various PILs in the Supreme Court, including a PIL for the framing of guidelines for protection of Good Samaritans, which led to the insertion of Section 134-A in the Motor Vehicles Act to provide statutory protection to Good Samaritans from any civil or criminal proceedings. SLF has launched various initiatives such as the Zero Fatality Corridor on the Mumbai-Pune expressway. SLF has recently filed a PIL on the right to Trauma Care, being a constituent of the right to life under Article 21 of the Constitution, and a part of the “minimum core obligations of the State”.

== Membership of committees and nominations ==
- Nominated by the Chief Justice of India as the Chairperson of the Advisory Board of the Consortium of National Law Universities in India in June 2023.
- Member of the Central Council of the Institute of Chartered Accountants of India, a statutory body established under the Chartered Accountants Act, 1949 in 2016.
- Member of the Indo-British Legal Forum held in January 2003 and March 2008.
- Represented India at the Convention on the Rights of the Child, conducted by the Commonwealth Secretariat in May 1988 at Dhaka, Bangladesh.

== Publications and academic pursuits ==
Justice Malhotra has published the Third Edition (Thomson Reuters, 2014) and Fourth Edition (Wolters Kluwer, 2020) of the Commentary on the Law of Arbitration in India. The Commentary has been cited by the Supreme Court and High Courts in various landmark and seminal Judgments.

== Bibliography ==
- The Law and Practice of Arbitration and Conciliation: The Arbitration and Conciliation Act (1996)
