= Cecilia Hyunjung Mo =

American political scientist

- Citizenship: American
- Education: University of Southern California (BA), Loyola Marymount University (MA), Stanford University (MA, PhD)
- Occupation: Political scientist
- Employer: University of California, Berkeley

Cecilia Hyunjung Mo is an American political scientist currently serving as an associate professor of political science at the University of California, Berkeley. Her research focuses on American politics, comparative politics, political behavior, and public policy.

== Early life and education ==
Mo holds a BA in mathematics and interdisciplinary studies from the University of Southern California, a MA in secondary education from Loyola Marymount University, a MA in political science from Stanford University, and a PhD in political economics from Stanford Graduate School of Business (2012).

== Publications ==
=== Asian-American participation in U.S. Politics ===
==== Why Do Asian Americans Identify As Democrats? Testing Theories of Social Exclusion and Intergroup Solidarity ====
Mo examines the causes of why Asian-American voters are majority Democrat. She looks at two major causes: 1) social exclusion and 2) intergroup solidarity. Her work goes on to identify possible explanations of racial political behavior in the United States electoral process.

==== Why Asian Americans don't Vote Republican ====
Washington Post's article by Cecilia Mo discusses the possible explanations of why Asian Americans tend to lean more left than right. Her research focuses on the assumption that Asian Americans income would sway them more Republican, but offers instead that because of the political climate towards Asian Americans, they tend to vote Democrat.

== Awards ==
- American Political Science Association 2015 Franklin L. Burdette Pi Sigma Alpha Award
- International Society of Political Psychology 2018 Roberta Sigel Early Career Scholar Best Paper Award
- American Political Science Association 2020 Emerging Scholar in Elections, Public Opinion and Voting Behavior Award
