= Anu Malhotra (judge) =

Judge of Delhi High Court

Hon'ble Ms. Justice (Retd.) Anu Malhotra

Judge of Delhi High Court
- In office 8 November 2016 – 26 November 2022
- Nominated by: T. S. Thakur
- Appointed by: Pranab Mukherjee

Personal details
- Born: 27 November 1960 (age 65) Ahmedabad, Gujarat
- Education: University of Delhi

Anu Malhotra (born 27 November 1960) is a former Judge of the Delhi High Court, in India. She has decided a number of key cases relating to freedom of expression, education, governance, and criminal law in India, including a widely reported ban on the publication of a book about businessman and yoga teacher Ramdev, a case concerning poll campaigns by sitting Members of Parliament, and several public interest petitions filed against municipal corporations regarding infrastructure and governance in Delhi.

== Life ==
Malhotra was born in Ahmedabad, Gujarat, and was educated at Duruelo Convent and Mithibai College in Mumbai. She earned a B.Sc. in 1980, and an LL.B. from the Faculty of Law, University of Delhi in 1983.

== Career ==
Malhotra joined the Delhi Judicial Service in 1985, and became a part of the Delhi Higher Judicial Service in 2000. She additionally trained as a mediator, and was the director of the Delhi Judicial Academy between 2009 and 2011. Malhotra served as a District and Sessions Judge in Delhi until 2016, when she was appointed a Permanent Judge of the Delhi High Court.

While sitting on the High Court, Malhotra has decided a number of key cases relating to the law governing education in India. In 2017, Malhotra and another judge, Gita Mittal, allowed a public interest petition and directed municipal corporations in Delhi to publish school vacancies online to facilitate admission processes into government schools. In 2019, she and another judge quashed a decision taken by the University of Delhi and the University Grants Commission to make mathematics a mandatory component in determining admissions to commerce and economic degrees, holding that they had failed to notify the change in requirements sufficiently in advance. In July 2019, she dismissed a petition filed to challenge the admission process for Christian students at St. Stephen's College in Delhi.

Malhotra has also decided a number of key cases pertaining to the freedom of expression in India. In 2018, Malhotra heard a widely reported case filed by 'Ramdev' Ram Kisan Yadav, a religious leader, yoga teacher, and businessman, who sought a restraint on the publication of a book about him, on the grounds that it defamed him. Malhotra banned publication of the book, upholding his 'right to reputation, and included excerpts of defamatory passages in her judgment. The publishers of the book have appealed against this judgment in the Supreme Court of India.

In 2017, Malhotra refused to grant an order that would prohibit Members of Parliament and Members of Legislative Assemblies in India from participating in election campaigns for their parties while holding office, stating that a "blanket order" restraining speech could not be allowed. Also in 2017, Malhotra refused to allow an application by BJP Member of Parliament Kirti Azad. Azad had asked the Court to dismiss a suit for defamation filed against him by Hockey India and its president, N.D. Batra, after he made certain statements regarding them. Malhotra held that Azad's parliamentary privileges did not extend to cover statements made outside parliamentary proceedings.

Malhotra has passed a number of key judgments relating to criminal offences in India. In 2017, she and another judge reduced the life sentence awarded to a 25-year-old man convicted of murder, to six years, on the grounds that he had a wife and children to support, and therefore ought to be given the chance to reform. In 2018, she directed a trial court to expedite their decision relating to allegations of evidence tampering in a case concerning the 1997 Uphaar Cinema Fire, ordering status reports to ensure a reduction in delays. Malhotra is also one of several judges who have heard proceedings in relation to the 2013 Indian helicopter bribery scandal.

Malhotra has decided several public interest petitions filed in relation to infrastructure and governance in the National Capital Territory of Delhi. In 2017, she and another judge, Gita Mittal, heard a case concerning the demolition of a gym by the Municipal Corporation of Delhi and converted into a public interest litigation, ordering the corporation to publish the details of all illegal constructions online. Malhotra and Mittal went on to describe the lack of transparency in municipal activities as "sheer hell". In May 2017, along with Judge Gita Mittal, Malhotra heard a petition against Delhi municipal corporations, concerning municipal efforts to control outbreaks of chikungunya and dengue, holding that illegal construction and badly-managed sewage were responsible for the same. In the same month, they held that the minimum wage established by the Delhi Government was inadequate, and asked the Delhi Government to respond with new proposals, criticized the Delhi Government and North Delhi Municipal Corporation for allowing the construction of a public urinal under an electrical transformer, citing safety concerns, and rebuked the Delhi and municipal governments for failing to adequately implement welfare schemes.
