= Prince Mehra =

Indian social worker

- Born: Manjit Singh; India
- Occupation: Social worker
- Years active: 1990–present

Prince Mehra, also known as Manjit Singh, is an Indian social worker based in Chandigarh. He is noted for his voluntary work rescuing and rehabilitating injured birds in the Tricity region of Chandigarh, Mohali, and Panchkula.

== Career ==
Mehra began bird rescue work in 1990 after observing incidents involving injured birds. He equipped a bicycle with medical supplies to deliver first aid to birds in urban areas and later transitioned to using an electric scooter to extend his range. He treats birds injured due to electrocution, kite string entanglement, heat exposure, and other urban hazards. He is reported to have treated and rehabilitated over 1,100 injured or distressed birds. Additionally, he has performed the last rites for 600 deceased birds.

In addition to his voluntary efforts, Mehra is employed as a drawing teacher in a government school. In 2016, he was appointed to the Chandigarh Administration’s Animal Husbandry Department as an animal attendant. His rescue work is conducted independently and is not part of his formal duties.

== Recognition ==
Mehra was featured in the Limca Book of Records in 2014 for operating a mobile bird ambulance. In 2021, he received a State Award from the Chandigarh Administration in recognition of his contributions to animal welfare.

== Public activities ==
Mehra has engaged in public awareness and preventive measures during kite-flying festivals and high-temperature periods, such as distributing water bowls and providing first aid guidance for birds. Cases requiring advanced care are referred to veterinary hospitals or animal welfare organizations.
