= Neil Malhotra =

American political scientist

- Education: Yale University; Stanford University
- Awards: Top 40 Under 40, Poets & Quants; Emerging Scholar Award, APSA Elections
- Scientific career
- Fields: Political science
- Workplaces: Stanford University; University of Pennsylvania

Neil Malhotra is an American political economist. He is the Edith M. Cornell Professor of Political Economy in the Graduate School of Business at Stanford University, where he is also the Louise and Claude N. Rosenbrg, Jr. Director of the Center for Social Innovation. He studies the politics of the United States, survey methodology, and voter behavior in elections, including work on retrospective voting and disaster preparedness and relief politics.

== Education and early work ==
Malhotra attended Yale University, where he earned his BA in economics in 2002. At Yale he was mentored by Donald Green, whom he has credited with inspiring him to become a political scientist. He then attended Stanford University, earning an MA in 2005 and a PhD in 2008.

After obtaining his PhD, Malhotra joined the faculty at the Stanford University Graduate School of Business. He remained there until 2010, when he moved to the political science department at the University of Pennsylvania. In 2011, he returned to the Graduate School of Business at Stanford University, where he is also affiliated with the political science department.

== Career ==
=== Academic positions ===
Since 2015, Malhotra has been the Louise and Claude N. Rosenberg Jr. Director of the Center for Social Innovation. In 2017 he was named the Edith M. Cornell Professor of Political Economy, and in 2019 he was named The Susan Ford Dorsey Faculty Fellow at the Stanford University Graduate School of Business.

=== Research ===
Malhotra has published work on American politics, voting behavior in elections and other forms of political behavior, and the methodology of survey research. His work on voter behavior includes research on the problem of retrospective voting, and how strongly voters consider past events when arriving at a vote choice. Malhotra has also published work on disaster response by governments, and how that response is rewarded or punished by voters. In 2009 he published the study "Myopic voters and natural disaster policy" in the American Political Science Review, which led to consultations with the Federal Emergency Management Agency about optimal disaster preparedness. The study showed evidence that voters reward incumbents for disaster relief spending, but not for disaster preparedness spending.

Since 2018, Malhotra has been a frequent contributor to Forbes. He has been quoted or cited in The Washington Post regarding topics such as government crisis response strategies, the effects of major external events on elections, and corporate responsibility, and on similar topics in venues like The Atlantic, The New York Times, and Fortune.

=== Awards ===
During 2012–2013, Malhotra was the recipient of a grant from the Russell Sage Foundation to study how voters weight recent events compared to events in the distant past, which is related to the question of retrospective voting in American politics.

In 2015, Poets & Quants listed Malhotra as one of the top 40 professors under 40 years old. In 2016, Malhotra won the Emerging Scholar Award from the Elections, Public Opinion, and Voting Behavior Section of the American Political Science Association, which "is awarded to the top scholar in the field who is within 10 years of her or his PhD". In 2024, he was selected to the Andrew Carnegie Fellowship program.

== Personal life and other interests ==
Malhotra is married to Jane K. Willenbring. They have one child together, who was born in 2012.

== Selected works ==
- "Completion Time and Response Order Effects in Web Surveys", Public Opinion Quarterly 72(5):914–934 (2008)
- "Myopic Voters and Natural Disaster Policy", with Andrew Healy, American Political Science Review 103(3):387–406 (2009)
- "Irrelevant events affect voters' evaluations of government performance", with Andrew J. Healy and Cecilia Hyunjung Mo, PNAS 107(29):12804–12809 (2010)
- "Retrospective Voting Reconsidered", with Andrew Healy, Annual Review of Political Science 16:285–306 (2013)
- "Publication bias in the social sciences: Unlocking the file drawer", with Annie Franco and Gabor Simonovits, Science 345(6203):1502–1505 (2014)
