= Kripal Parmar =

Indian politician

Member of Parliament, Rajya Sabha
- In office 2000–2006
- Constituency: Himachal Pradesh

Personal details
- Born: 20 October 1959 (age 66)
- Party: Bharatiya Janata Party

Kirpal Parmar is an Indian politician. He was a Member of Parliament, representing Himachal Pradesh in the Rajya Sabha the upper house of India's Parliament
