= Neena Malhotra =

Indian politician

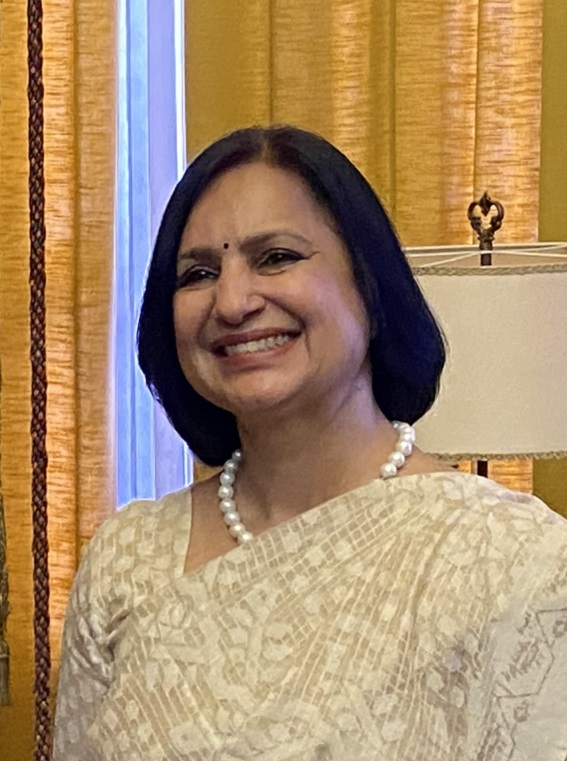
Neena Malhotra

Neena Malhotra (born 1967) is an Indian Foreign Service officer (1992) and is currently the Secretary (South) of the Ministry of External Affairs of India. From, September 2020 till April 2024, she was the Indian Ambassador to Italy, Republic of San Marino, and UN Organizations in Rome with residence in Rome. She was appointed India’s Ambassador to the Kingdom of Sweden in October 2024, after serving as officer on special duty at the Ministry of External Affairs.

== Career ==
Malhotra has served early in her career in New York and Paris. She was appointed the head of the In early 2020, Malhotra was shuffled from Joint Secretary (Eastern and Southern Africa) to Additional Secretary (Indo-Pacific). In September 2020 it was announced Malhotra would be Indian Ambassador to Italy, Republic of San Marino and UN Organizations in Rome. She holds a Ph.D degree from the Indian Agricultural Research Institute (IARI), New Delhi.

== Controversies ==
Neena Malhotra served as press counselor at the Consulate General in New York from 2006 to 2009. She was sued in 2010 for slavery in the United States District Court for the Southern District of New York by their former maid Shanti Gurung.

According to the lawsuit, the Malhotras required Gurung to sleep on the floor in their living room despite the presence of unoccupied bedrooms. They allegedly confiscated her passport and visa immediately after issuance and kept them locked in Neena Malhotra’s bedroom so she could not access them. Gurung was permitted to leave the apartment only to run errands and was repeatedly warned that if she failed to return, “the American police and Homeland Security would take [her] money and would find, beat, rape, and imprison [her] before shipping [her] back to India as ‘cargo.’” The complaint states that the Malhotras systematically deprived Gurung of food, allowing her to eat only leftover scraps from meals she prepared for the family and their guests. As a result, she “went hungry as there were no leftovers to eat,” and was also denied rice, a staple of her diet. Her weight reportedly fell from approximately 147 pounds to less than 84 pounds during the forty months she worked for the family. The lawsuit further alleges that the Malhotras misrepresented Gurung’s employment contract to obtain an A-3 visa for her, submitting a document promising US-minimum-wage pay while actually offering her 5,000 Indian rupees per month for domestic work. Gurung claims she never received the wages promised under either version of the contract.

The United States District Judge and former United States Ambassador to the Economic and Social Council of the United Nations Victor Marrero presided over the case. Marrero entered a judgment in favor of Shanti Gurung and awarded in 2012 a judgment of US$1,458,335 against the Malhotras based on the finding of United States Magistrate Judge Frank Maas. Gurung was represented by Mitchell Alan Karlin of Gibson, Dunn & Crutcher. As of 2016, the judgment remains unpaid.

Malhotra was cleared of all charges by an enquiry by the Indian Ministry of External Affairs and the Delhi High Court restrained the maid and her solicitors from pursuing any legal action in India.

In 2013, while serving as the joint secretary of the passport and visa division, Malhotra denied a visa for a US diplomatic spouse on the basis of homosexuality. Another Indian diplomatic official quoted by the Indian Express said it had been common practice in the past to give visas to a gay couple as a family member. After the incident, Malhotra was transferred by the MEA to the archives and record management division.
