= Derek Khanna =

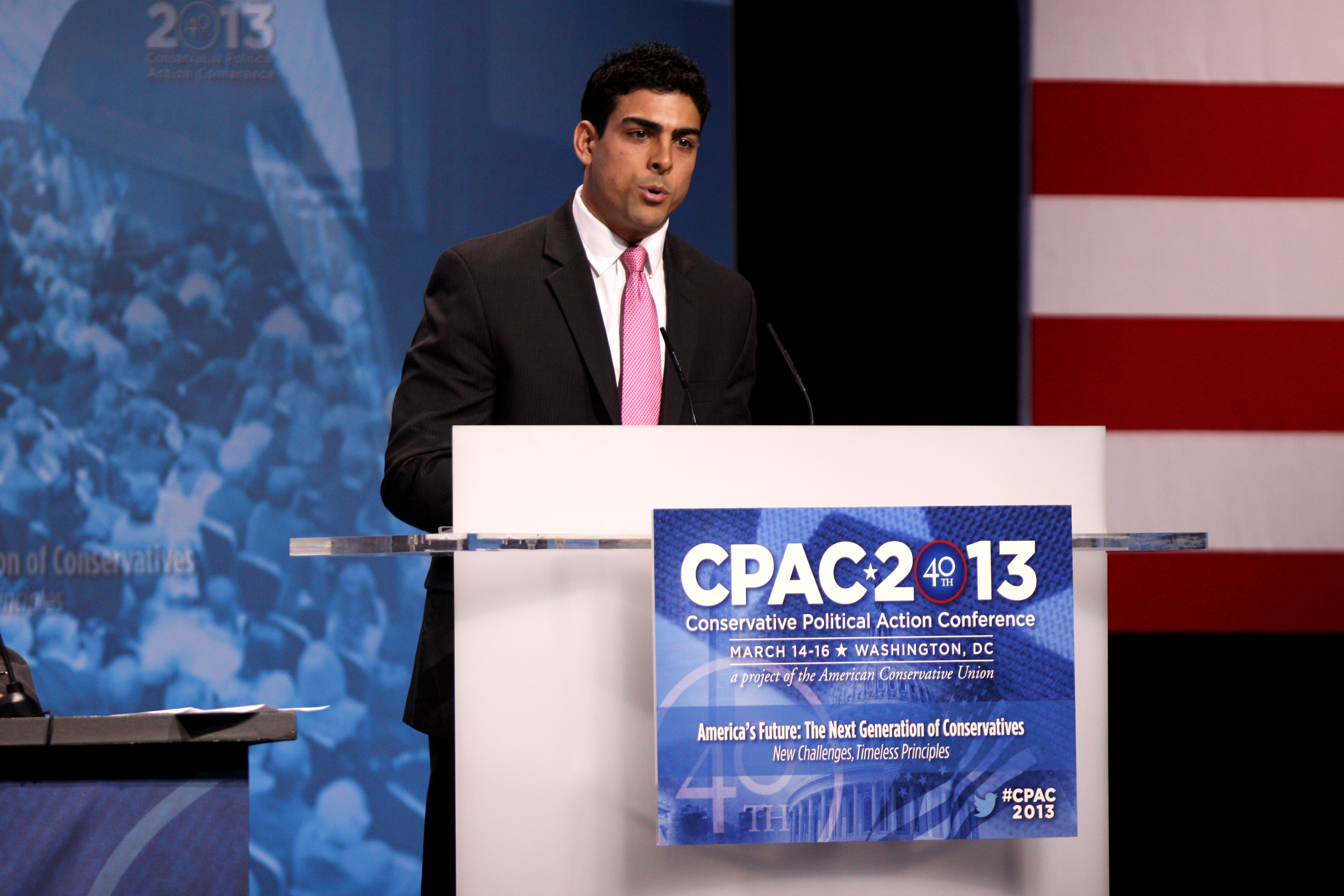
Derek Khanna speaking at the 2013 Conservative Political Action Conference (CPAC) in National Harbor, Maryland.

Derek Khanna (born Derek Satya Khanna sometime after 1984) is an American conservative political commentator and columnist. He has written for The Washington Post and The Guardian, maintains a blog with Forbes, and is a regular contributor with The Atlantic, National Review Online, Human Events and Politix. He is also an adviser and board member to several technology start-ups. He was listed on Forbes's 2014 list of 30 under 30 for law in policy for his work on technology policy and the successful phone unlocking campaign which resulted in the Unlocking Consumer Choice and Wireless Competition Act (S. 517/ P.L. 113-144) passing Congress and being signed into law by President Obama on August 1, 2014.

== Political experience ==
Khanna worked for Senator Scott Brown (R-MA) from 2010-2012. He describes his experience working on technology issues and the SOPA/PIPA protest in a chapter he contributed to the book Hacking Politics.

In 2012 he worked for the House Republican Study Committee (RSC) where he managed technology, defense and government oversight policy issues. During his time with the RSC he was asked to write a policy brief on copyright reform. On November 16, 2012 the RSC released an official report on copyright reform entitled "Three Myths about Copyright Law and Where to Start to Fix it." The report was independently confirmed as being vetted and approved by the RSC. However, within 24 hours the RSC received push-back from pro-copyright lobbying groups and they took the report off-line. The withdrawn memo quickly went viral online and was supported and endorsed by entrepreneurs, venture capitalists and policy experts, such as Virginia Postrel.

Numerous conservative organizations and individuals endorsed the report and its reforms. Among them: American Conservative Union put it on their website, Congressman [Darrell Issa] tweeted in favor, An op-ed in the Wall Street Journal also endorsed supported the reforms.

Khanna wrote a reflection on the RSC Report in Cardozo Law Review: Arts & Entertainment Law Journal.

== Other experiences ==
Since January 2013, Khanna has been a fellow with Yale Law's Information Society Project where he has published on intellectual property and innovation policies. In 2013, Khanna participated in Washington Post's first Wonkblog Debate with Matt Yglesias, Ezra Klein and Sarah Binder.

On January 27, 2013, Khanna kicked off a national campaign to legalize cellphone unlocking. A ruling by the Librarian of Congress made cellphone unlocking a federal crime under the Digital Millennium Copyright Act (DMCA). Khanna's legal analysis demonstrated how this act could result in jail time of up to five years and $500,000 fine for unlocking one's own device. Khanna teamed up with entrepreneur Sina Khanifar on a White House We The People petition.

Their campaign quickly went viral online; within a month their petition reached 114,322 signatures, which was the first petition to reach 100,000 signatures.

He now works for The Boston Consulting Group in Miami, Florida.

== Reception ==
Khanna has been called a "wunderkind" for his ideas on innovation and technology policy, New York Times columnist David Brooks has referred to him as a "rising star" in the Republican Party, and Techcrunch has referred to him as a "living martyr against the entertainment and telecommunication lobbies."
