= Kum Kum Khanna =

Indian molecular biologist

Kum Kum Khanna is an Indian molecular biologist and professor at the Mater Research Institute. She has published numerous peer reviewed articles in journals including Nature Genetics, Cancer Cell, Nature, and Oncogene.

Her most cited article, has received over 1,500 citations since its publication in 2001. She has made discoveries relating to single-stranded DNA binding proteins hSSB1 and hSSB2 involved in DNA repair, identified the protein Cep55 involved in regulation of the final stage of the cell cycle, and functionally characterised the BRCA2-interacting protein Centrobin.

According to Research.com, she has a D-index of 88 in Molecular Biology, with 280 publications and over 28,000 citations.
