= Chavi Khanna Koneru =

American journalist and lawyer

Chavi Khanna Koneru (born 1983) is an American journalist and lawyer who is the executive director and co-founder of North Carolina Asian Americans Together (NCAAT). She worked for the United States Department of Justice Civil Rights Division in 2008 before going on to the Lawyers' Committee for Civil Rights. She was also the a policy director for NARAL Pro-Choice North Carolina (NaralNC) before she co-founded and directed NCAAT in 2016. She has been honored by Cary Magazine and awarded the Gold Futures Challenge Prize.

== Early life and education ==
Koneru was born in 1983 in Oakland, California, into a Punjabi Hindu family. She moved to Durham, North Carolina, when she was six years old. In 2006, she obtained her undergraduate degree in journalism at the University of North Carolina at Chapel Hill. She also earned a graduate degree in law in 2009 from the same university.

== Career ==
In 2008, Koneru worked in the United States Department of Justice Civil Rights Division while in her third year of law school at UNC Chapel Hill. After graduation, she worked at the Lawyers' Committee for Civil Rights and the pro-choice organization NaralNC before co-founding North Carolina Asian Americans Together (NCAAT) in 2016 with Ricky Leung. NCAAT is a non-partisan nonprofit organization whose mission is to increase civic engagement in the Asian community in North Carolina. In 2021, she was recognized as an Honoree of the Women of Western Wake by Cary Magazine. In 2022, Gold House awarded her the Gold Futures Challenge Prize.

== Affiliations ==
Koneru is a 2023–24 council member for the North Carolina Council for Women. She is also an executive committee member of the Asian American Power Network.
