= Dhai Ghar =

Tribal group in India

The Dhai Ghar (also written as Dhaighar) Khatris originally consisted of three family groups of North India – Kapoor (or Kapur), Khanna and Malhotra (or its alternatives, Mehra and Mehrotra).

To quote Sudhir Kakar

The Khatris were divided into sub-castes. The highest was the Dhai ghar (i.e. two and a half houses – the number three being considered unlucky) grouping, comprising families carrying the surnames of Malhotra, Khanna and Kapur/Kapoor.
