= Bhagaban Majhi =

Indian politician

Member of Parliament, Rajya Sabha
- In office 1994-2000
- Constituency: Odisha

Personal details
- Born: 18 March 1950 (age 76)
- Party: Janata Dal
- Spouse: Subarna Prasad Majhi

Bhagaban Majhi was an Indian politician. He was a Member of Parliament, representing Odisha in the Rajya Sabha the upper house of India's Parliament as a member of the Janata Dal.
