= Manmohan Malhoutra =

Indian diplomat

Manmohan Malhoutra is a former Indian diplomat and Assistant Secretary-General of the Commonwealth of Nations.

Malhoutra studied history at the University of Delhi where he won a Rhodes Scholarship to Balliol College, Oxford. He entered the Indian Administrative Service in 1961 and between 1966 and 1974 served in the office of the Indian Prime Minister as a foreign policy and environmental issue advisor to Indira Gandhi. In 1975 he became Special Assistant to the Commonwealth Secretary-General and in 1977 the Director and Head of both the Secretary-General's Office and the International Affairs Division.

Prior to Zimbabwe's independence in 1980 he led the Commonwealth Secretariat team which monitored Zimbabwe's pre-independence elections, and through the Commonwealth Eminent Persons Group between 1982 and 1993 he was active in applying political pressure in the removal of the apartheid regime in South Africa.

He is a former treasurer of the International Institute for Democracy and Electoral Assistance and is currently Secretary-General of the Rajiv Gandhi Foundation, a funding institute for social welfare programs in India.

He is the editor of "India: The Next Decade" (2006) ISBN 81-7188-564-0
