= Saloni Malhotra =

Indian businesswoman

- Education: Engineer, University of Pune
- Occupation: CEO
- Organization: DesiCrew
- Known for: Establishing rural BPOs in India.

Saloni Malhotra is the founder and CEO of DesiCrew, an IT-enabled service company that provides back-office and support services in rural areas of Tamil Nadu and Karnataka, India. She has worked to establish Business Process Outsourcing (BPO) companies in rural parts of the states and employ previously inexperienced and untrained people from small villages.

== Education ==
Saloni did her engineering from University of Pune in state of Maharashtra.

== Career ==
She started her career in an interactive media startup, Web Chutney based in Delhi. She came into contact of Professor Jhunjhunwala of TeNet group, IIT Madras and came up with the idea of establishing a BPO in Rural area.

Her company DesiCrew been recognized for this innovative approach and won the Sankalp award in 2009. DesiCrew has rural delivery centers in the Indian southern states of Tamil Nadu, Karnataka and Gujarat, and employs 900-odd people from these villages. She currently is on the Board of Directors of DesiCrew.

== Awards ==
- TiE Stree Shakthi Award (2011)
- Facilitated in the presence of the President of India by the CII
