= Jayant Malhoutra =

Indian politician

Jayant Kumar Malhoutra

Member of Parliament, Rajya Sabha
- In office 1994 – 2000
- Constituency: Uttar Pradesh

Personal details
- Born: 22 February 1936 Kanpur, United Provinces, India
- Died: 17 March 2008 (aged 72)
- Party: Janata Party
- Other political affiliations: Indian National Congress
- Spouse: Barota Malhoutra
- Occupation: Politician, Industrialist

Jayant Kumar Malhoutra (22 February 1936 – 17 March 2008) was an Indian politician. He was an industrialist by profession. He was elected to the Rajya Sabha in 1994 from Uttar Pradesh. He also served as national treasurer of Janata Party. He was the Leader of the United Parliamentary Group in the Rajya Sabha.

== Positions held ==
- 1973–1975 President, Bombay Management Association.
- 1994–2000 Member, Rajya Sabha.
- 1994–1996 Member, Committee of Home Affairs (Parliament).
- Member of Select Committee on Trade Marks Bill (Parliament).
- 1995–1996 Member, Committee on Subordinate Legislation.
- 1996–1998 Member, Committee on Industry.
- Member of Committee on External Affairs (Parliament).

== See also ==
- Jayant Malhoutra: The Rajya Sabha member who loves to drop names during conversations, India Today (1994)
- "There are no defence deals without middlemen" - Jayant Malhoutra, Rediff.com (2001)
