= List of Punjabi-language poets =

Poets of Punjabi language (Shahmukhi: پنجابی زبان دے شاعر, Gurmukhi: ਪੰਜਾਬੀ ਭਾਸ਼ਾ ਦੇ ਕਵੀ).

== Poets ==
- Afzal Ahsan Randhawa - 20th century
- Ahmad Rahi - 20th century
- Ahmad Shah Gujjar - 16th century
- Aizaz Ahmad Azar - 20th - 21st century
- Ajaib Kamal
- Ajmer Rode - 20th century
- Ali Arshad Mir - 20th century
- Ali Haidar - 17th - 18th century
- Amarjit Chandan - 20th century
- Amrita Pritam - 20th century
- Anwar Masood - 20th century
- Asim Bukhari - 20th - 21st century
- Baba Farid - (1173–1266)
- Babu Rajab Ali - 19th - 20th century
- Balbir Madhopuri
- Bari Nizami
- Bawa Balwant - 20th century
- Bhai Gurdas
- Bulleh Shah (1680–1757)
- Chaman Lal Chaman - 20th century
- Damodar Gulati - 15th century
- Darshan Singh Awara - 20th century
- Daya Singh Arif
- Dhani Ram Chatrik - 20th century
- Diwan Singh
- Faiz Ahmad Faiz - 20th century
- Fazal Shah Sayyad
- Ghulam Mustafa Tabassum
- Ghulam Rasool Alampuri - 19th century
- Giani Dhanwant Singh Sital - (1912-1980) 20th century
- Gurbhajan Gill
- Gurdas Ram Alam - 20th century
- Guru Amar Das - 15th - 16th century
- Guru Angad - 16th century
- Guru Arjun - 16th - 17th century
- Guru Gobind Singh - 17th century
- Guru Nanak - (1469 - 1539)
- Guru Ram Das - 16th century
- Guru Tegh Bahadur - 17th century
- Hafiz Barkhurdar (1658–1707)
- Harbans Bhalla (1930-1993) - 20th century
- Harbhajan Singh (poet)
- Harmanjeet Singh - 21st Century
- Hashim Shah - (1735–1843)
- Imam Din Gujrati (1870-1954)
- Ishar Singh (poet)
- Jaswant Singh Neki - 20th century
- Jaswant Singh Rahi - 20th century
- Javaid Rahi - 21st Century
- Jeet Aulakh - 20th century
- Khaqan Haider Ghazi
- Khawaja Pervaiz
- Khwaja Ghulam Farid - 19th-20th century
- Khwaja Haidar Ali Aatish - 20th century
- Lal Singh Dil - 20th century
- Lala Sehrai
- Lutf Ali - 18th century
- Manjit Indira
- Manjit Tiwana -20th century
- Manmohan (poet)
- Maula Shah
- Mazhar Tirmazi - 20th century
- Mian Mir
- Mian Muhammad Bakhsh - 19th-20th century
- Mir Tanha Yousafi - 20th century
- Mohan Singh - 20th century
- Mohan Singh Diwana
- Munawar Shakeel - 21st Century
- Munir Niazi - 20th century
- Najm Hosain Syed
- Nanak Singh
- Nand Lal Noorpuri
- Nanua Bairagi
- Narendra Mohan (poet)
- Navtej Bharati - 20th century
- Naz Khialvi
- Nisar Nasik
- Pash
- Peelu - 16th - 17th century
- Piro Preman - 19th century
- Pritam Singh Kasad
- Pritam Singh Safir
- Puran Singh - 20th century
- Qadaryar - 19th century
- Qadir Bux Bedil
- Ram Sarup Ankhi
- Ratan Singh Bhangu 18th-19th century
- Riaz ur Rehman Saghar
- Rupi Kaur
- S M Sadiq
- Sachal Sarmast
- Sadhu Singh Hamdard
- Saghar Siddiqui
- Saleh Muhammad Safoori
- Sangtar
- Sant Ram Udasi - 20th century
- Santokh Singh Dhir
- Sardar Panchhi
- Satinder Sartaj - 21st Century
- Satyapal Anand
- Shafi Aqeel
- Shah Hussain - 16th century
- Shah Mohammad - (1780–1862)
- Shah Sharaf
- Shahbaz Malik
- Shaista Nuzhat - 20th century
- Shardha Ram Phillauri
- Sharif Kunjahi - 20th century
- Sharif Sabir
- Sheila Gujral
- Shiv Kumar Batalvi - 20th century
- Sohan Singh Misha
- Sukhbir (writer)
- Sukhdarshan Dhaliwal - 20th century
- Sukhpal Vir Singh Hasrat
- Sukhwinder Amrit
- Sultan Bahu (1628–1691)
- Surjit Patar - 20th Century
- Sutinder Singh Noor
- Swarajbir Singh
- Ustad Daman - 20th century
- Veena Verma
- Verma Malik
- Vir Singh
- Waris Shah - (1722–1798)
- Wasif Ali Wasif - 20th century
