= List of people from Punjab, Pakistan =

This is a list of notable people from Punjab, Pakistan.

== Religious and spiritual figures ==
- Guru Nanak, founder of Sikhism
- Fariduddin Ganjshakar
- Bahauddin Zakariya
- Rukn-e-Alam
- Shah Hussain
- Mian Mir
- Sultan Bahu
- Shah Inayat Qadiri
- Bulleh Shah
- Waris Shah
- Muhammad Channan Shah Nuri
- Mian Muhammad Bakhsh
- Khwaja Ghulam Farid
- Meher Ali Shah

== National figures ==
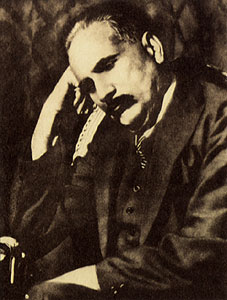
Muhammad Iqbal, one of the founding fathers and the national poet of Pakistan. Iqbal was of mixed Kashmiri and Punjabi heritage.

- Allama Muhammad Iqbal
- Rahmat Ali
- Liaquat Ali Khan
- Muhammad Zafarullah Khan
- Jahanara Shahnawaz
- Naseer Ahmed Malhi
- Shaukat Hayat Khan
- Ghazanfar Ali Khan
- Zafar Ali Khan
- Muhammad Abdul Ghafoor Hazarvi

== Pakistan Armed Forces ==
- Zia-ul-Haq, former Army Chief of Staff and former President of Pakistan (1977–1988)
- General Raheel Sharif, former Chief of Army Staff of the Pakistan Army
- General Qamar Javed Bajwa, former Chief of Army Staff of the Pakistan Army
- General Asif Nawaz Janjua, former Chief of Army Staff of the Pakistan Army
- Lt Gen Asim Saleem Bajwa
- Lt Gen Abdul Ali Malik
- Maj Gen Iftikhar Janjua
- Maj Gen Akhtar Hussain Malik
- Major Tufail Muhammad, recipient of the Nishan-e-Haider (NH)
- Major Raja Aziz Bhatti, recipient of NH
- Major Muhammad Akram, recipient of NH
- Major Shabbir Sharif, recipient of NH
- Captain Muhammad Sarwar, recipient of NH
- Naik Saif Ali Janjua, recipient of NH
- Lace Naik Muhammad Mahfuz, recipient of NH
- Sowar Muhammad Hussain, recipient of NH

== Politicians ==
- Amir Mohammad Khan, Nawab of Kalabagh, Governor of East Pakistan
- Chaudhary Nisar Ali Khan, Politician
- Chaudhry Muhammad Sarwar Khan, longest serving parliamentarian of Pakistan from 1951 to 1999
- Fazal Ilahi Chaudhry, former President of Pakistan (PPP)
- Hamza Shahbaz, former CM of Punjab (2022)
- Imran Khan, former Prime Minister of Pakistan (2018–2022)
- Malik Allahyar Khan (1927–2007), former member of parliament
- Maryam Nawaz Sharif, Chief Minister of Punjab (2024)
- Mian Aslam Iqbal, Provincial Minister of Industries & Commerce (2018–2022)
- Muhammad Rafiq Tarar, former President of Pakistan
- Nawabzada Nasrullah Khan, politician
- Pervaiz Elahi, first Deputy Prime Minister of Pakistan, former Chief Minister of Punjab (2002–2007)
- Qamar Zaman Kaira, former Minister (Pakistan Peoples Party)
- Shah Mehmood Qureshi, politician PTI
- Shujaat Hussain, former Prime Minister of Pakistan, current president of PML(Q)
- Usman Buzdar, Chief Minister of Punjab (2018–2022)
- Yasmin Rashid, Provincial Minister of Health (2018–2022)
- Yousaf Raza Gillani, former Prime Minister of Pakistan (Pakistan Peoples Party)
- Zulfi Bukhari, Politician
- Nawaz Sharif, former Prime Minister

== Lawyers ==
- Syed Muhammad Zafar
- Ashtar Ausaf Ali
- Syed Ali Zafar
- Azam Nazeer Tarar
- Hamid Khan
- Salman Akram Raja

== Writers and Poets ==
- Fariduddin Ganjshakar
- Shah Hussain
- Sultan Bahu
- Bulleh Shah
- Ali Haider Multani
- Lutf Ali
- Waris Shah
- Qadir Yar
- Mian Muhammad Baksh
- Khawaja Ghulam Fareed
- Ghulam Rasool Alampuri
- Zafar Ali Khan
- Muhammad Iqbal
- Hakim Ahmad Shuja
- Hafeez Jalandhari
- Faiz Ahmad Faiz
- Ustad Daman
- Hasan Manto
- Shareef Kunjahi
- Ahmad Rahi
- Habib Jalib
- Anwar Masood
- Aizaz Azar
- Mazhar Tirmazi
- Ali Arshad Mir
- Mir Tanha Yousafi

== Sportspersons ==
- Arshad Nadeem, javelin thrower and Olympic Gold Medalist
- Masood Fakhri, footballer
- Ajaz Akhtar, cricketer
- Amir Iqbal Khan, boxer
- Abdul Khaliq, sprinter
- Shoaib Akhtar, cricketer
- Abdul Razzaq, cricketer
- Wasim Akram, cricketer
- Abdul Hafeez Kardar, cricketer
- Inzamam-ul-Haq, cricketer
- Waqar Younis, cricketer and sports presenter
- Shahnaz Sheikh, hockey player
- Shoaib Malik, cricketer
- Misbah-ul-Haq, cricketer
- Saeed Anwar, cricketer
- Muhammad Amir, cricketer
- Babar Azam, cricketer
- Imran Khan, cricketer
- Haris Rauf, cricketer
- Shadab Khan, cricketer
- Ramiz Raja, cricketer & commentator

== Scientists ==
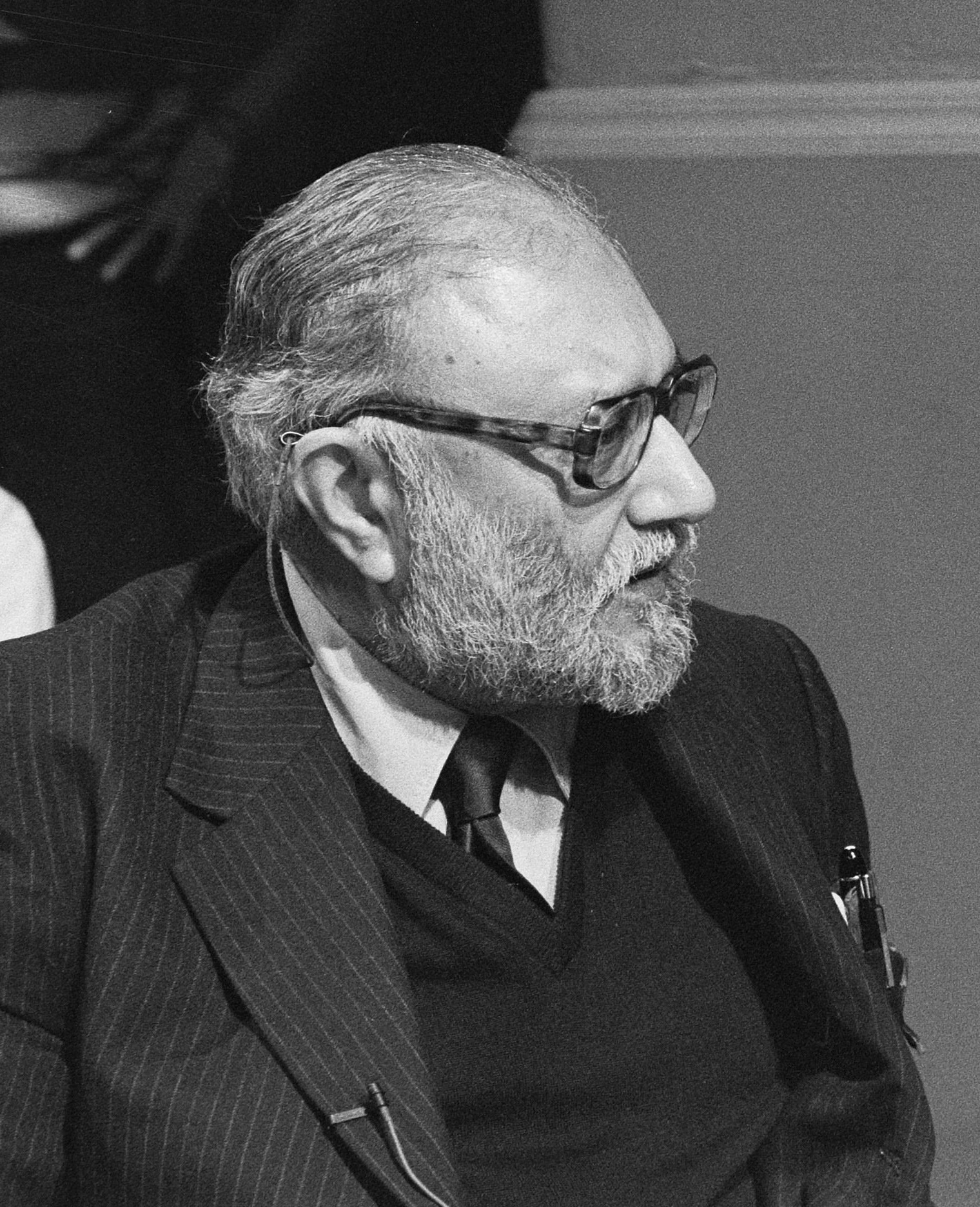
Abdus Salam, the first Pakistani to win a Nobel prize in Physics.

- Abdus Salam, theoretical physicist and Nobel Prize winner in Physics for his contributions to the Electroweak force
- Riazuddin, theoretical physicist and one of the key developers of the theoretical designs of Pakistan's nuclear weapons
- Masud Ahmad, theoretical physicist and one of the key developers of the theoretical designs of Pakistan's nuclear weapons
- Ayyub Ommaya, neurosurgeon and inventor of the Ommaya reservoir
- Mahbub ul Haq, economist and inventor of the Human Development Index (HDI)

== Film and TV artists ==
- Sultan Rahi, actor
- Shaan Shahid, actor
- Bilal Ashraf, actor
- Humayun Saeed, actor
- Ali Zafar, actor
- Balraj Sahni, Indian actor
- Dev Anand, Indian actor

== Singers ==
- Abrar ul Haq, Punjabi folk and pop singer
- Alam Lohar, Punjabi folk singer
- Arif Lohar, Punjabi folk singer
- Pathanay Khan, Punjabi folk singer
- Inayat Hussain Bhatti, Punjabi folk singer
- Musarrat Nazir, Punjabi folk singer
- Fateh Ali Khan, qawwali singer
- Farrukh Fateh Ali Khan, qawwali singer
- Rahat Fateh Ali Khan, qawwali singer
- Badar Miandad, qawwali singer
- Ghulam Farid Sabri, qawwali singer
- Maqbool Ahmad Sabri, qawwali singer
- Amjad Sabri, qawwali singer
- Nusrat Fateh Ali Khan, qawwali singer
- Noor Jehan, classical singer
- Atif Aslam, pop singer
- Shaukat Ali, folk singer

== Others ==
- Chaudhary Niaz Ali Khan (civil engineer)
