= Aulakh =

- Jāti: Jat
- Religions: Sikhism, Islam, Hinduism
- Languages: Punjabi
- Country: India, Pakistan
- Region: Punjab
- Ethnicity: Punjabi

Aulakh (Punjabi: ਔਲਖ) is a Punjabi Jat clan in the Punjab region of India and Pakistan.

== List of notable people ==
Notable people with the surname, who may or may not be associated with the clan, include:

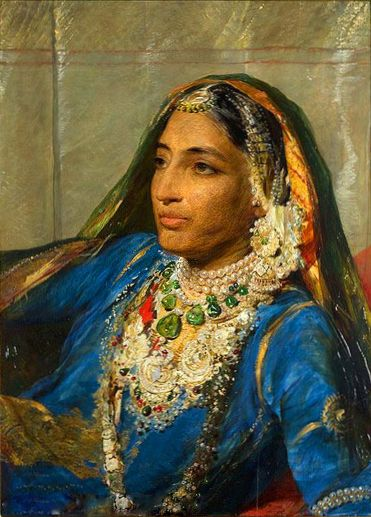
Jind Kaur, youngest wife of Ranjit Singh, Sikh emperor of Punjab.

- Arjan Singh, Marshal of Indian Air Force
- Ajmer Singh, Indian sprinter
- Ajmer Singh Aulakh, Indian author
- Angad Aulakh, American filmmaker
- Baldev Singh Aulakh, Indian politician
- Gurmit Singh Aulakh, American Khalistani activist
- Jawahar Singh, Wazir of the Sikh Empire
- Jeet Aulakh, Canadian artist
- Jind Kaur, Maharani of the Sikh Empire
- Malik Ahmad Ali Aulakh, Pakistani politician
- Manny Aulakh, Canadian cricketer
- Mohammad Irfan, Pakistani cricketer
- Ratan Aulakh, Indian filmmaker
- R. D. Singh, Indian athletics coach

== See also ==
- Aulakh (village)
