= Gurbhajan Gill =

Indian Author

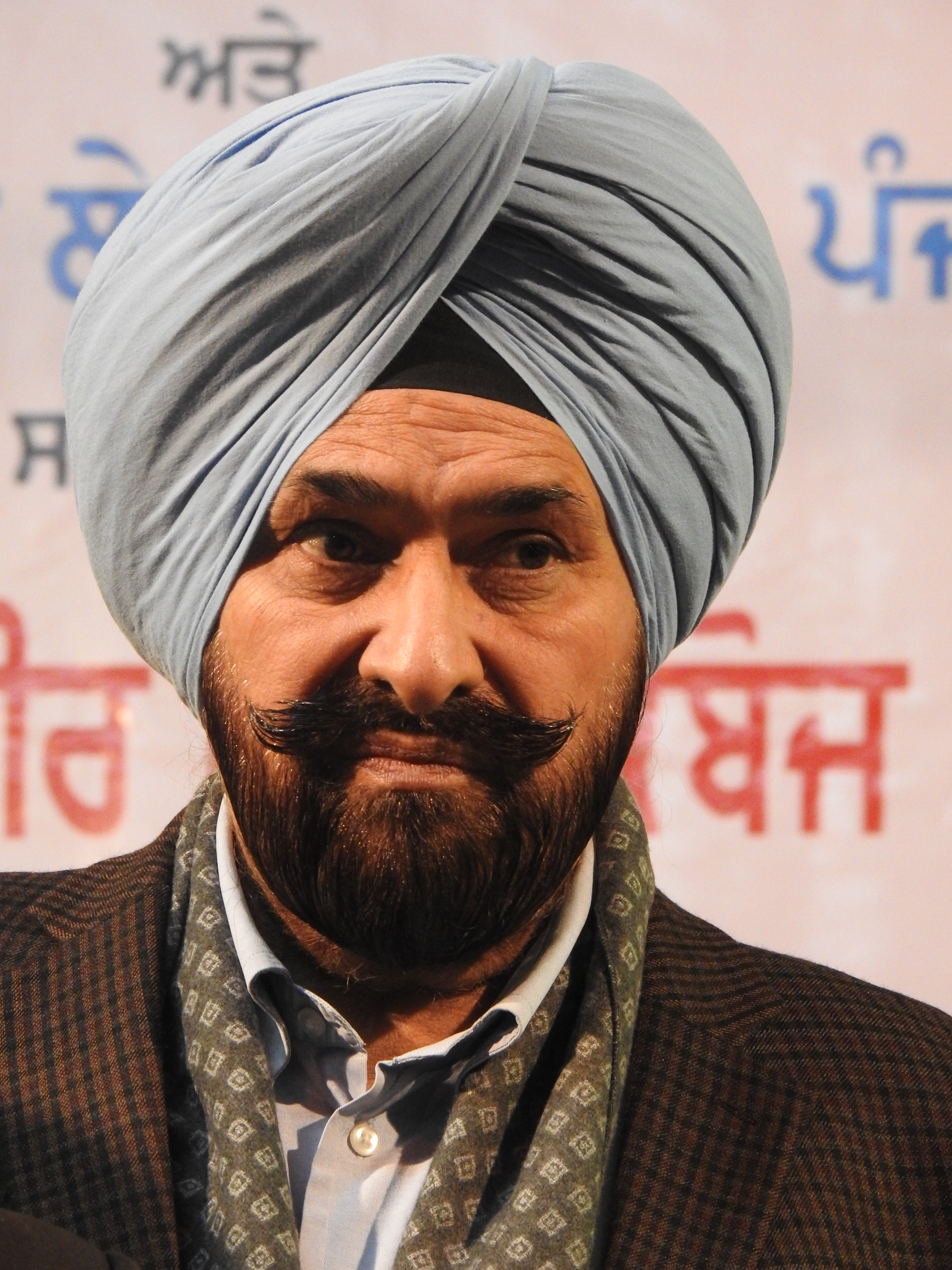
- Born: Gurbhajan Singh Gill; 2 May 1953 (age 73); Village: Basant Kot, Tehsil Batala, Gurdaspur district, Punjab, India
- Education: Govt. College Ludhiana, Punjab University, Chandigarh
- Occupations: Poet, writer, editor

Gurbhajan Singh Gill (born 2 May 1953), more popular as Gurbhajan Gill is a Punjabi poet, literary commentator and active cultural activist in Ludhiana, India.

== Biography ==
Gurbhajan Gill was born in Basant Kot village of Batala tehsil of Gurdaspur district, Punjab, India. He received his graduate and postgraduate degrees at GGN Khalsa College, Ludhiana, and Govt. College (Boys) Ludhiana respectively. He served for sometime as a Lecturer- in- Punjabi at Guru Nanak National College, Doraha and LRM College (now DAV College) Jagraon. Since 1983 he has been working as Editor (Punjabi) at Punjab Agricultural University, Ludhiana.

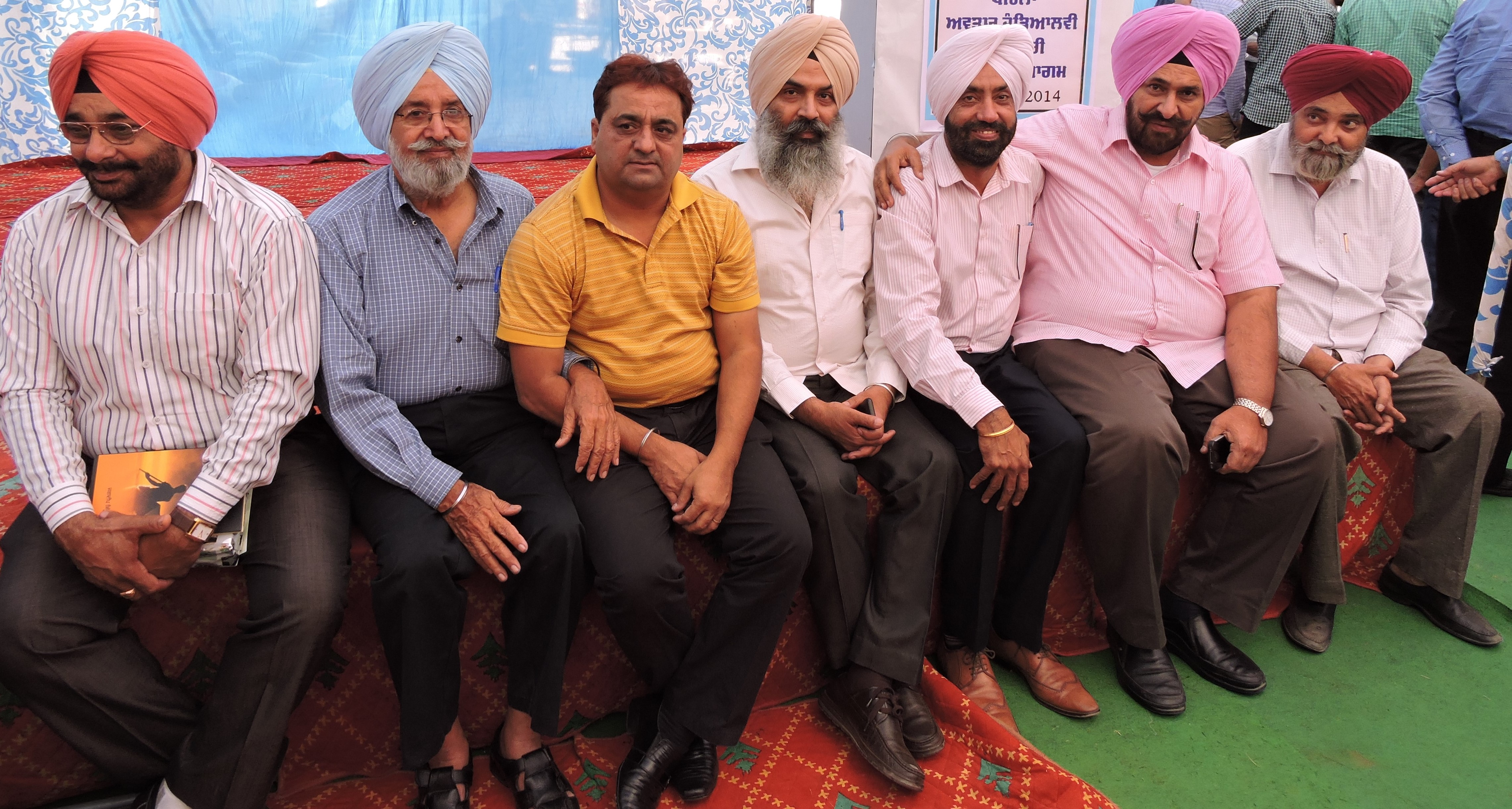
Punjabi writer with other writers

== Major works and publications ==
- Sheesha Jhooth Bolda hai (Poetry collection)
- Har Dhukhda Pind Mera hai (Gazal Collection)
- Surkh Samundar (The first two collections are in a single volume)
- Do Harf Raseedi (Ghazals)
- Agan Katha (Poetry collection)
- Mann de Buhe Bariya (Ghazals)
- Dharti Naad (Poetry collection)
- Khair Panja Paaniya Di (Poems about Indian Pak Relationships)
- Fullan di Jhanjhar (Song Collections)
- Paardarshi (Poetry collection)
- MorPankh (Ghazals)
- Man Tandoor (Poetry collection)
- Taryan de Nal Gallan Kardyan (Ghazals)
- Gulnar (Ghazals)
- Mirganwali (Ghazals)
- Camere di Akh Boldi
- Raavi (Ghazals)
- Pippal Pateeaan(song collection)

== Awards ==
- Prof Gurbhajan Singh Gill was honoured with Balraj Sahni Memorial Award by Space Cinema during the 5th Ludhiana Short Film Festival organised at Ishmeet Singh Music Institute, Ludhiana, on December 7.
