= Sharif Sabir =

Pakistani author (1928–2015)

Sharif Sabir شریف صابر
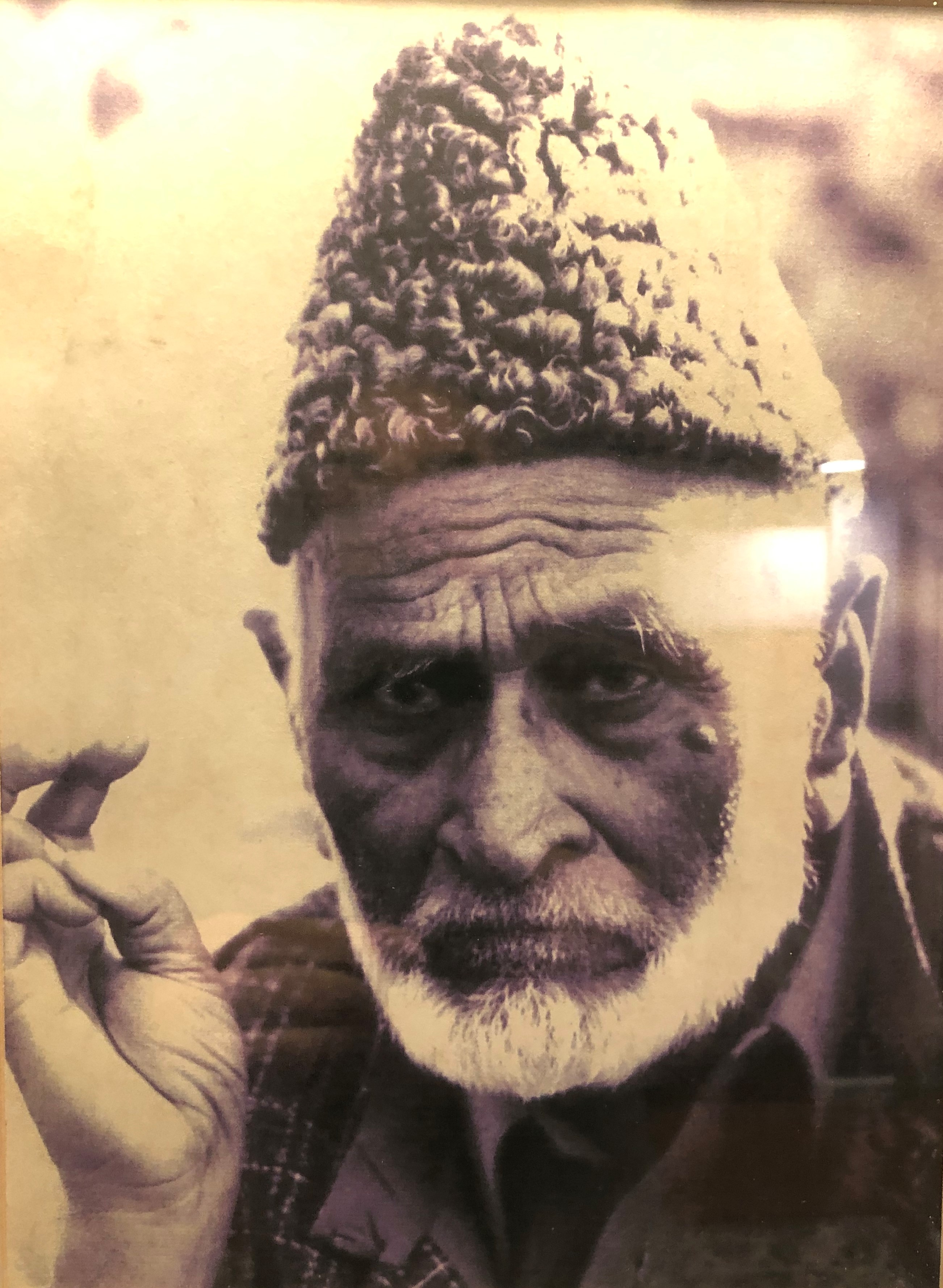
- Born: 18 May 1928; Pakki Saraan (near Lahore), Sheikhupura District, Punjab, British India
- Died: October 1, 2015 (aged 87); Narang Mandi, Punjab, Pakistan
- Citizenship: Pakistan
- Spouse(s): Scholar, editor, author
- Children: 6

Sharif Sabir (18 May 1928 – 1 October 2015) was a Pakistani scholar, editor, and author known for his contributions to the study of Punjabi literature. Sabir is recognized for his critical edition of Heer Waris Shah, a significant text in Punjabi folklore. His edition was based on research into rare manuscripts and regional dialects, and it has been utilized as a resource by scholars in the field. In acknowledgment of his contributions to literature, Sabir received the Pride of Performance award from the Government of Pakistan.

== Early life and education ==
Sharif Sabir was born in Pakki Saraan, Sheikhupura District, near Lahore, Pakistan. During his teenage years, he worked to support his education. Sabir began his professional career as an English language teacher in a government school. While teaching, he earned a master's degree in Persian and subsequently taught both Persian and Urdu at Lahore's Central Model School. His expertise in language education led to his appointment as a language specialist at the Central Training College, where he trained teachers. Later, he was promoted to the position of headmaster. Sabir was subsequently appointed by the Punjab government and the Waris Shah Academy to conduct research and edit Heer Ranjha. He officially retired in the 1980s but continued to engage in literary work.

== Research and editing of Heer Waris Shah ==
Sharif Sabir was appointed to the Waris Shah Memorial Committee (WSMC), which was established by the Punjab Cultural Department. During his two-year tenure, he oversaw the construction of Waris Shah's shrine in Jandiala Sher Khan and the publication of an authentic version of "Heer Waris Shah." Prior to joining the committee, Sabir dedicated 12 years to researching the text.

As a part of his research, he accessed a rare manuscript from 1821 located in Patiala, Punjab, and consulted with traders, craftsmen, and experts to understand the language and context used by Waris Shah. He also traveled throughout Punjab to study regional dialects and local traditions. Sabir's edited version of "Heer Waris Shah" was first published by the WSMC in 1985. In 2006, he released a revised edition through Progressive Books in Lahore, which included glossaries that explained difficult words and provided contextual details about individuals and locations mentioned in the text.

== Literary contributions ==
Sharif Sabir contributed to texts relating to Punjabi literature, including Heer Waris Shah, as well as complete poetry by Bulleh Shah, Sultan Bahu, and Saiful Malook of Mian Muhammad Bakhsh. His works include glossaries explaining difficult terms, a feature not commonly found in Punjabi literary texts; however, the Guru Granth Sahib contains a comprehensive glossary similar to those found in Sabir's works. Below is a list of books he authored, edited, or translated:

Book	Original Author	Sabir's Contribution
Kalaam	Baba Farid	Edited (Due Publication)
Saiful Malook	Mian Muhammad Bakhsh	Edited
Heer Waris Shah	Waris Shah	Edited
Abyat-e-Bahoo	Sultan Bahu	Edited
Bulleh Shah	Bulleh Shah	Edited
Farsi Kalam	Sufi Muhammad Afzal Faqeer	Translated
Puran Bhagat	Qadir Yar	Translated
Kashf ul Mahjoob	Ali Hujwiri	Translated
Gulistan and Bustan	Saadi Shirazi	Translated
Hatkoray	Sharif Sabir	Authored
Baghawat	Sharif Sabir	Authored
Punjabi Drama	Sharif Sabir	Authored
Autobiography	Sharif Sabir	Authored

== Honors and recognition ==
Sharif Sabir was honored with the Pride of Performance award by the Government of Pakistan for his work on Heer Waris Shah. In addition, he was awarded a cash prize of Rs. 70,000 in recognition of his contributions to Punjabi literature.

== Personal life ==
Sharif Sabir was married to Zubaidah Akhter and had four sons and two daughters. One of his sons died in a childhood accident. His remaining children emigrated to the United States in 2008, and Sabir visited them in 2013, staying for two years before returning to his village in Pakistan.

== Death ==
Sharif Sabir died on 1 October 2015, in his village after developing a chest infection. He was buried near a local saint's tomb in Narang Mandi.
