= Sohan Singh Misha =

Punjabi poet

Sohan Singh
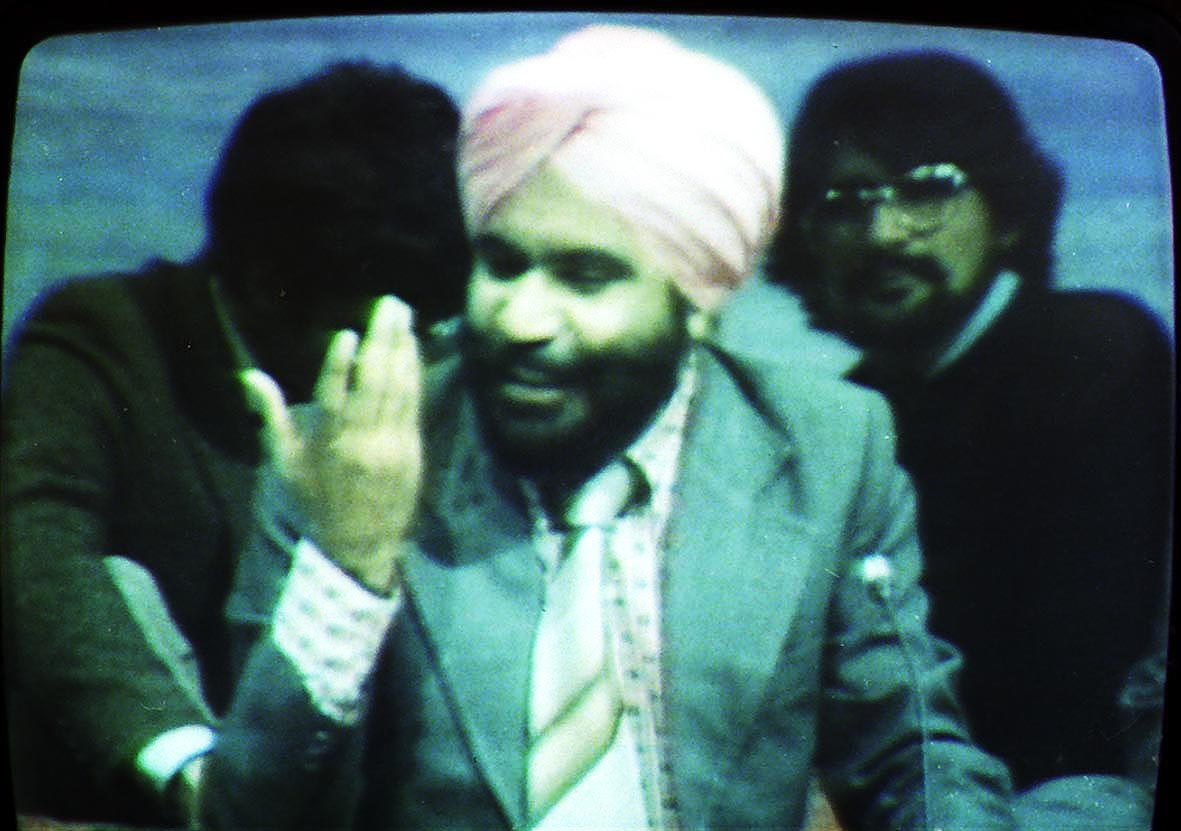
- Born: 30 August 1934; Bhent, district Kapurthala (British Punjab)
- Died: 22 September 1986 (aged 52)
- Education: M.A. English
- Alma mater: Government College, Hoshiarpur
- Occupation: poet
- Spouse(s): Misha, Surinder Kaur
- Writing career
- Period: 1956–1986
- Notable work: Kach de vastar

Misha, Sohan Singh (30 August 1934 – 22 September 1986) was a Sahitya Akademi Award winning Punjabi poet.

== Early life ==
Misha, Sohan Singh was born at village Bhent in Kapurthala district (British Punjab).

== Awards ==
He received Sahitya Akademi award in 1978 for Kach de vastar (Poetry).

== See also ==
- List of Punjabi language poets
