= Shah Sharaf =

17th-century Sufi poets of India

Shah Sharaf (1640 – 1724) was a Punjabi Sufi poet who wrote his work in Kafi style. He also wrote Dohras and Shuturnama.

Among the people whom his poetry influenced, Bulleh Shah is the most popular.

== See also ==
- Baba Bulleh Shah
- Punjabi language
- Punjabi people
- List of Punjabi language poets
