= Damodar Gulati =

16th/17th-century Punjabi poet

- Born: 16th century Sultanpur, Jhang, Punjab (now in Punjab, Pakistan)
- Occupation: Punjabi poet
- Writing career
- Language: Punjabi
- Period: 16th century
- Genre: Tragedy
- Notable work: Heer Ranjha

Damodar Gulati (Note: Gurmukhi: ਦਮੋਦਰ ਗੁਲਾਟੀ, Shahmukhi: دمودر گلاٹی) (Punjabi: [dəmoːdəɾ gʊlaːʈi]; c. 16th century – 17th century) also known as Damodar Das Arora, was a Punjabi poet, of the 16th and 17th centuries. He is widely celebrated for his poetic narration of the romance tragedy Heer Ranjha, based on a preexisting Punjabi oral legend; his tradition continued to be adapted throughout centuries in Punjabi literature. He lived during the reign of Mughal emperor Akbar.

== Biography ==
=== Heer and Ranjha ===
He wrote the Qissa Heer and Ranjha (ہیر رانجھے دا قصہ) and was the first to put the story to paper, adapted from a preexisting and circulating legend. He claims to be the eye witness of this tale. His Qissa (story) is deemed the oldest and the first Heer Ranjha in Punjabi literature. He states in the poem that he is from Jhang—the home of Heer, one of the poem's two main characters. He wrote his rendition and the original tale of Heer Ranjha in the dialect of Sandal Bar, though even after the lapse of five hundred years the language used in the story is nearer to the modern Majhi dialect. An analysis by Najam Hussain Syed led him to believe that Damodar Gulati was not actually an eyewitness to the tale but rather he was using a storytelling technique that was misinterpreted as meaning he was simply an eyewitness. In reality, Gulati's position to the characters in the tale is similar to that of Sanjaya of the Mahabharata epic, who used paranormal powers to see what was happening at the Kurukshetra War.

=== Religious identity ===
On the matter of his religious identity, the majority of scholars describe him as a Punjabi Hindu. The Encyclopaedia of Indian Literature, mentioned that Gulati was influenced by Sufi and Sikh thought.

The Hindu poet Damodar, as far as we know, was the first person to compose an epic-length Punjabi text of Heer Ranjha.

— Farina Mir, Punjab Reconsidered: History, Culture, and Practice (Oxford University Press)

=== Style ===
He does have also a peculiar style, at the end of a quaternary he repeats Aakkh Damodar means "Say Damodar":

آکھ دمودر میں اکھی ڈٹھا لگی ہون لڑائی

Aakkh Damodar mein Akkhi ditha laggi hon Ladai

(Say Damodar I witnessed with my eyes the battle started )

نک تے کن تنہاں دا وڈھیئے جو چوری یاری کریندے

دوجا نک تنہاں دا وڈھیئےجو حق پرایا لیندے

تیجا نک تنہاں دا وڈھیئے جو کوئی وڈھی کھاندے

آکھ دمودر جنہاں سچ سنجھاتے سے بہشتی جاندے

Nak tey kan tinhan da wadhaiy jo chori, yari karaindey

Doja nak tinhan da wadhaiy jo haq pariaya lendey

Teja nak tinhan da wadhaiy jo koi wadhi khandey

Aakkh Damodar jinha sach sanjhatey sey bhashti jandey

(Amputate the ears and nose of those who commit theft and have extra marital affairs,

Second chop off the nose of those who usurp the right of others,

Third hack off the nose of those who accept bribe,

Say Damodar only those will go to paradise who recognize the truth)

توں کیوں زوری کرناں ایں قاضی ڈرے خدا توں ناہیں

میرا حق رانجھیٹا ایہو سنیاں سبھ لوکائی

لے کے وڈھی حق گنوائیں کڈھ کتاب وکھائی

آکھ دمودر ہیر آکھے قاضی سبھ شرع تکائی

Toun keyoun zori karna ain qazi dery Khuda tu naheen

Mera haq Ranjheeta ay, ho suneya subh lokai

ley key wadhi haq ganvain kadh kitab vakkhai

Aakkh Damodar Heer Akkhey qazi subh Sharah (shariah) takai.

(Why do you compel me, O, qazi don't you have fear of God,

Ranjheeta is mine, all the people know

You (qazi) have accepted bribe, infringed my right, showing the book (shariah)

Say Damodar, Heer tells qazi showed her the whole Shariah.

— Damodar Gulati

Ahmad Shah Gujjar and Waris Shah later adapted Heer and Ranjha.

Particular importance is placed on finer details in the storytelling of Gulati's works.

== Legacy ==
The Heer and Ranjha renditions of Ahmad Shah Gujjar, Waris Shah, Muqbal, and Charagh Awan were all based on Damodar Gulati's original version.
