= Pakhral (Mirpur) =

Coordinates: 32°09′N 75°13′E

Pakhral (Mirpur) is a village in Khari Sharif, AJK, Pakistan. It is located on the left side of the Jhelum River. As of the 1998 Pakistani census, its population was 697.

== Education ==
Pakhral Village has a primary school run by the government of AJK, and consists of 5 grades:

- Grade 1: 5–6 years old
- Grade 2: 6–7 years old
- Grade 3: 7–8 years old
- Grade 4: 8–9 years old
