= Khari Sharif =

Place in Azad Kashmir, Pakistan

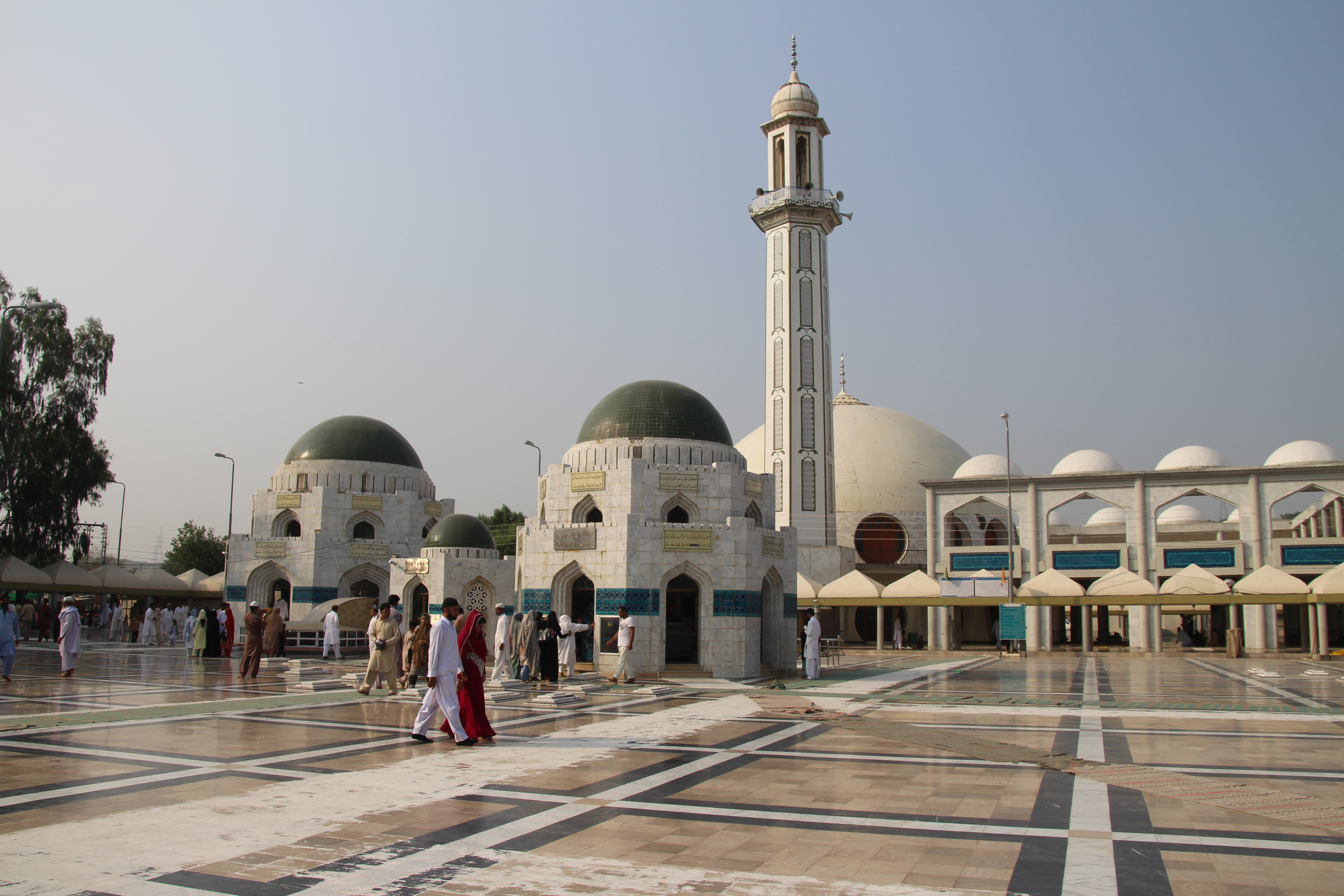
The shrine of Mian Muhammad Bakhsh.

Khari Sharif (كھڑي شريف) is an agricultural area in the Pothohar Plateau between the cities Jhelum and Mirpur of Azad Kashmir, Pakistan. Broadly speaking, Alaqa-e-Khari (translation in English: Area of Khari) refers to the fertile plains of Khari which exist between the mountains of Mirpur and the river Jhelum. Khari has some 80 small and large villages and one of the villages itself is known as Khari Sharif. It is located at a distance of 8 km south from the city of Mirpur and is known for housing the shrines of Sufi saints known as Pir Shah Murad Ghazi Qalandar Damri Wali Sarkar and Mian Muhammad Bakhsh.

The place acts as a great seat of learning for students of Sufism. Historically it was a residence of a famous dervish of this region. It houses the large famous Sufi shrine known as the Darbar Sharif Pir Shah Ghazi which receives thousands of pilgrims each year.

According to the 1998 Pakistan Census, the population was 9,632.

== See also ==
- Baba Shadi Shaheed
- Pakhral (Mirpur)
