= Nirupama Dutt =

Indian poet, journalist and translator (born 1955)

- Born: 1955 (age 70–71)
- Occupations: Poet, journalist and translator

Nirupama Dutt (born 1955) is an Indian poet, journalist and translator. She writes poems in Punjabi, and translates them into English herself.

A senior journalist with forty years of experience, she has worked with leading Indian newspapers and journals. Her biography of Bant Singh, a Dalit Icon, The Ballad of Bant Singh: A Qissa of Courage has been widely noticed. She has also translated the memoirs and poetry of Punjab's Dalit revolutionary poet Lal Singh Dil in a volume called Poet of the Revolution: The Memoirs and Poems of Lal Singh Dil. She has published one volume of poems – Ik Nadi Sanwali Jahi (A Stream Somewhat Dark) – for which she was awarded the Punjabi Academy Award in 2000. Her poetry has been translated into English, Hindi, Kannada, Bengali and Urdu and featured in various anthologies. In 2004, she co-edited with Ajeet Cour an anthology of SAARC (South Asian Association for Regional Cooperation) poetry entitled Our Voices.

She has translated the short poems of Gulzar in a volume titled 'Pluto' and 'Stories of the Soil' is her translation of 41 Punjabi stories into English. She has also edited a book of fiction by Pakistani women writers called Half the Sky and one of resistance literature of Pakistan called 'Children of the Night'.

As a journalist, Dutt has taken a strong secularist line standing against fundamentalism and communalist violence. She has written on issues ranging from terrorism in Punjab, the November 1984 massacre of the Sikhs, the Babri Masjid demolition and the Gujarat carnage. Nirupama's poetry has been featured on the Poetry Web International.

She is convener of a women's study group called Hamshira. She lives and writes in Chandigarh.

== Awards ==
- Punjab Lalit Kala Akademi Sanman - 2019
- Punjabi Academy Award for Ik Nadi Sanwali Jahi (A Stream Somewhat Dark) - 2000
