= Ahmad Shah Gujjar =

Punjabi poet

Ahmad Shah Gujjar (Note: Punjabi: احمد شاہ گجر) (c. 16th century – 17th century), commonly known as Ahmad Gujjar, was a 16th and 17th-centuries Punjabi poet, during the regime of the Mughal emperor Jahandar Shah. He was the first Punjabi Muslim writer to create a poetic version of the famous Heer-Ranjha story. His book, "Heer Ahonad", offered a unique twist on the tale, differing from earlier writer Damodar's version. Later poets preferred Shah's interpretation.

The story of Heer Ranjha was first written by Damodar Das Gulati. Later, Ahmad Shah Gujjar wrote his version, "Heer Ranjha", around 1682. Later other Punjabi poets, including Waris Shah and Shah Jahan Muqbal, were inspired by Ahmad's version. Waris Shah's famous version of "Heer Ranjha" came about thirty years after Ahmad's version.

== Early life ==
Ahmed Shah was born in approximately 1617 A.D into a Punjabi family of the Muslim Gujjar tribe.

== Poetic works ==
Ahmed Shah Gujjar is best known for writing "Kissa Heer" (The Tale of Heer Ranjha). He followed Damodardas Arora's version and created his own interpretation, "Heer-Ranjha" or "Ahomond". Ahmed Shah was the first Punjabi Muslim to write this famous story, between (1682-1693).

== Sources ==
- Mukherjee, Sujit (1998). A Dictionary of Indian Literature: Beginnings-1850. Orient Longman. p. 8. ISBN 9788125014539.
- Sekhom, Santa Singha (1993). A History of Panjabi Literature Volume 2. Publication Bureau, Punjabi University. p. 87. ISBN 9788173802638.
- Akhtar, Muhammad Saleem (1993). Islam in South Asia 1993. National Institute of Historical and Cultural Research. p. 251. ISBN 9789694150369.
- Singh, Gurcharan (1988). Warris Shah. Sahitya Akademi. p. 18.
- Shah Hashmi, Hameed Ula (1992). Punjabi Adhab di Tareekh (in Urdu). Taaj Book Deepu. p. 115.
- Ahsan, Abdushshakur (1981). پاکستانى ادب [Pakistani literature] (in Urdu). اداره تحقيقات پاکستان، دانشگاه پنجاب،. p. 209. ISBN 978-969-425-034-2.
