= Malik Ahmad Ali Aulakh =

Pakistani politician

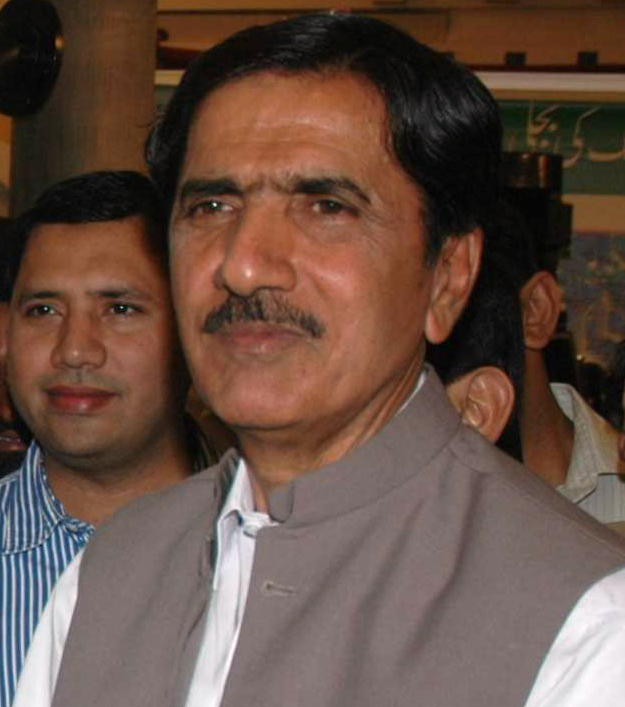
- Malik Ahmad Ali Aulakh

Member of the Provincial Assembly of the Punjab
- In office 15 August 2018 – 14 January 2023
- Constituency: PP-280 Layyah-I

Personal details
- Party: PML-N
- Other political affiliations: IND-Opposition 2018-2023 PML-N 2008-2013

Malik Ahmad Ali Aulakh is a Pakistani politician and Ex-Minister who had been a member of the Provincial Assembly of the Punjab multiple times.

== Early life ==
Malik Ahmed was born in Karor, Layyah district, on August 1, 1950. He graduated from Government Degree collage, Dera ghazi khan in 1971.

== Political career ==
He was elected to the Provincial Assembly of the Punjab as an independent candidate from Constituency PP-280 (Layyah-I) in the 2018 Pakistani general election.

He served as a member of provincial assembly of punjab across 3 separate tenures: 1988-1990, 1990-1993, and 1997-1999.He also served as member of Provincial Assembly of Punjab 2008-2013 and as Minister Agriculture, Cooperatives, Livestock & Dairy Development, Forestry, Fisheries & Wildlife, Tourism & Resort.
