= Sardar Panchhi =

Indian poet (Punjabi, Urdu, and Hindi) (born 1932)

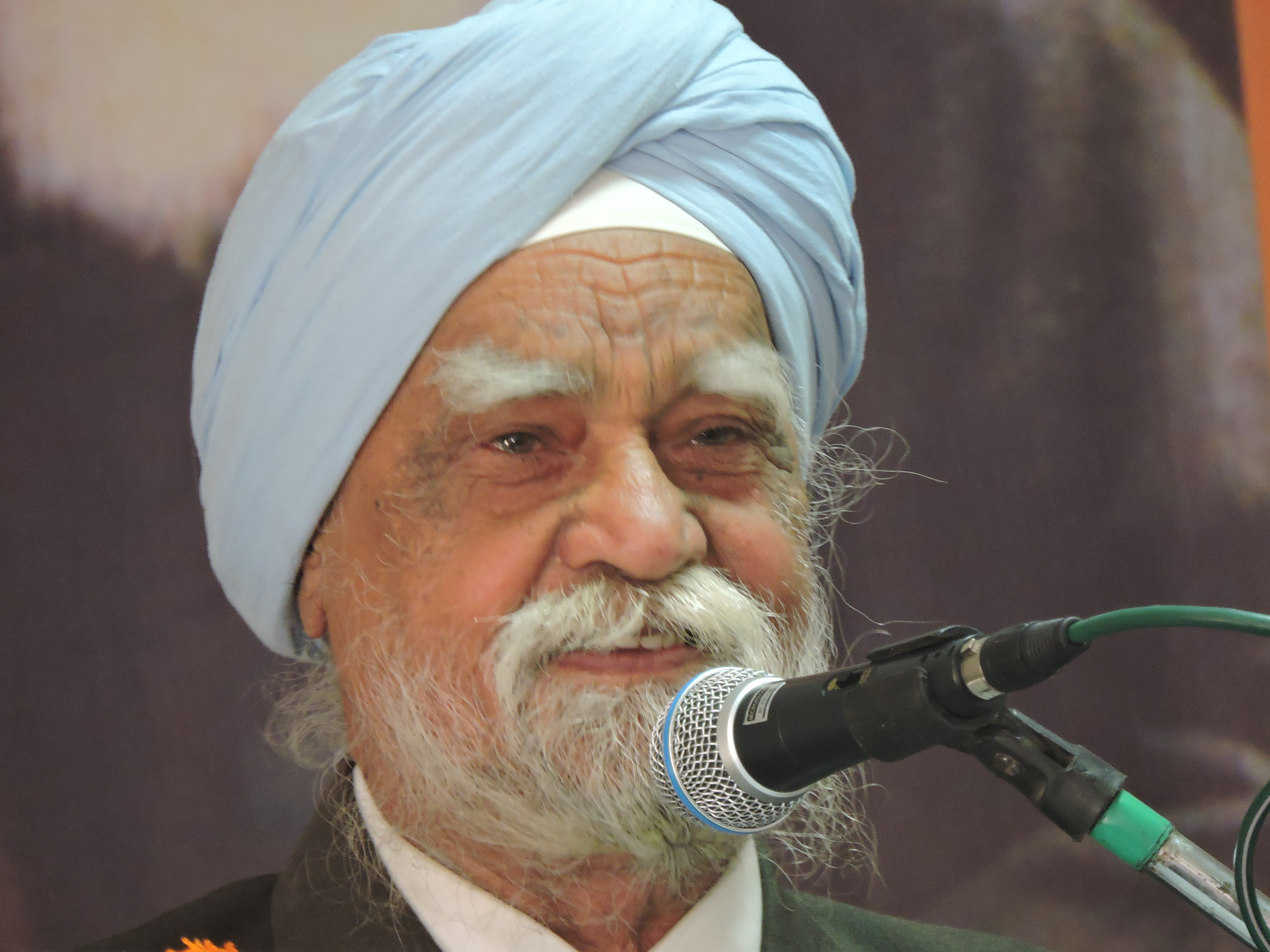
Sardar Panchhi reciting his poem, 2015

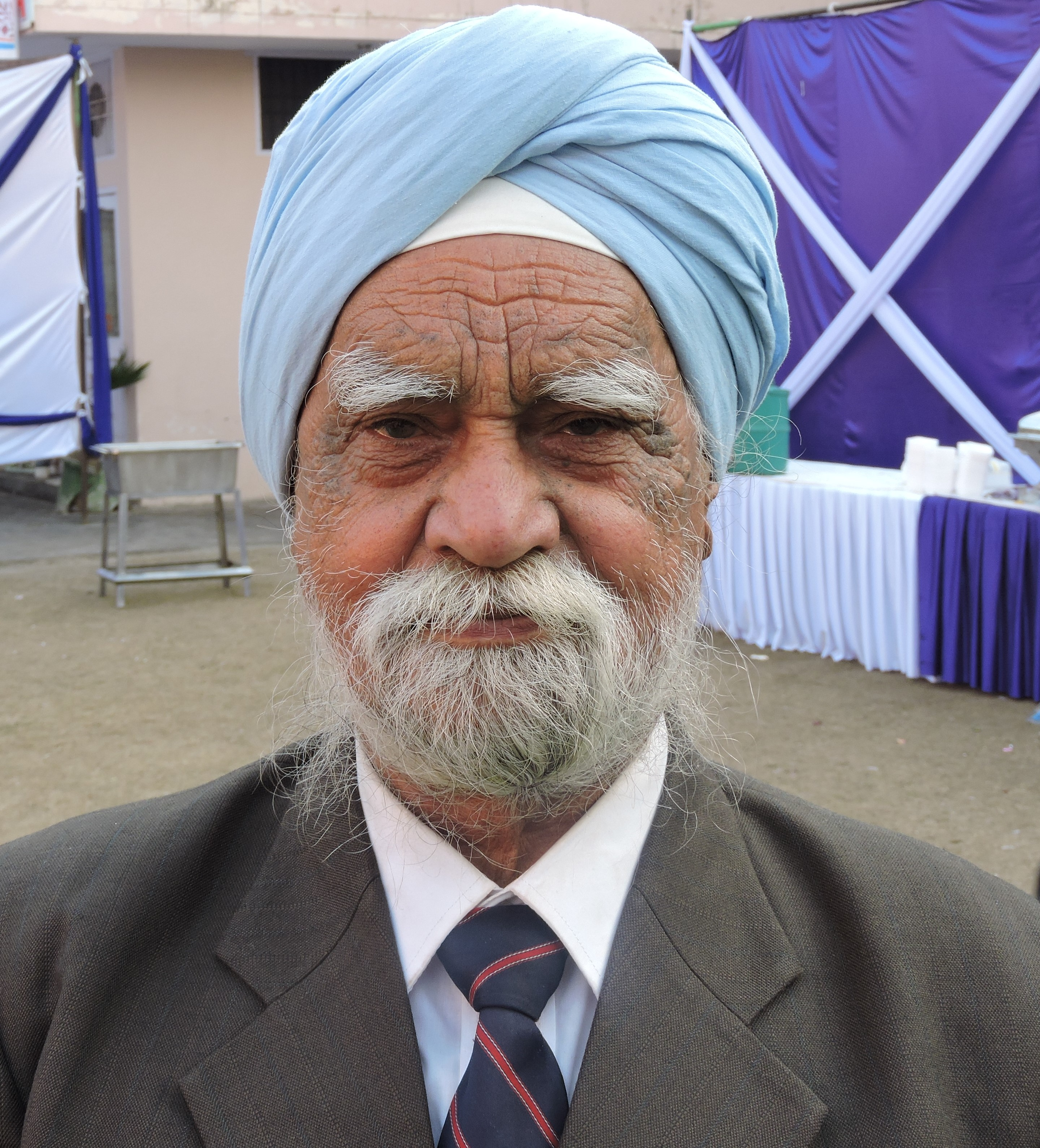
Sardar Panchhi, 2015

Sardar Panchhi (original name: Karnail Singh, born 14 October 1932) is an Indian poet, writing in the Punjabi, Urdu and Hindi languages.

Sardar Panchhi is his pen name.

Panchhi has also written several songs for Bollywood movies. Notable of them are "Ek Chadar Maili Si" and "Waris."

== Life ==
He was born (14 October 1932) and brought up at a village near Gujranwala, British Punjab (now in Pakistan). He was age 17 when India was partitioned and he and his family had to migrate to India.

== Books ==
Panchhi has written seven books in Punjabi, nine in Urdu and two in Hindi.

- Mazdoor Ki Avaz
- Sanvley Suraj
- Suraj Ke Sakhe (ISBN 9788178833163, publisher: Chetna Prakashan)
- Adhoore But
- Dard Ka Tarjuma
- Turkre Turkre Ayana(ISBN 9788178834351,

publisher: Chetna Prakashan)

- Vanjhli de Sur
- Shivranjni
- Nakash-E-Kadam
- Meri Nazar Men Aap
- Ujalon Ke Hamsafar
- Gulistan-E-Aqidat
- Bostan-E-Aqidat
- Panchhi Dee Parvaz
- Kadam Kadam Tanhai (ISBN 9788178833903, publisher: Chetna Prakashan)
