= Manmohan (poet) =

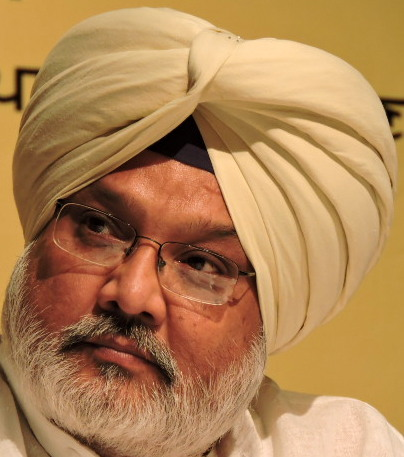
- Manmohan
- Born: Manmohan; Amritsar
- Occupation: ADG Intelligence Bureau
- Writing career
- Genres: Novel, poetry, criticism
- Notable work: Nirvaan

Manmohan is a poet and linguist of Punjabi language. He was honoured with the Sahitya Akademi Award in 2013 for his novel Nirvaan. Nirvaan is the first novel of Manmohan. In this novel he has presented the reality which he studied and lived through experience in past years of life. ।

== Writings ==
=== Collection of poetry books ===
- Agle Chaurahe Takk (1982)
- Mann Mahial (1989)
- Mere Mein Chandni (1993), Hindi
- Sur Sanket (1998)
- Nmitt (2001)
- ath (2004)
- Neelkanth
- Dooje Shabdan 'ch
- Baikhri (2013)

=== Novel ===
- Nirvaan (2011)

== Criticism and others ==
- Vichar Chintan and Others (2003)
- Partakhan te Pripekh (2005)
- Book About Drida(2006)
- Michael Phooko (2000)
- Mikhail Bakhtin (2012)
- The Structure of Gurmukhi Orthography’ (2009)

=== Translations ===
- Shikari Dian Yadan (2001)
- Akhri Ticket (2006)
- Indira Gandhi (Writer Inder Malhotra, 2007)
