= Basant Kot =

- Village
- Interactive map of Basant Kot
- Coordinates: 31°54′53.24″N 75°04′32.08″E
- Country: India
- State: Punjab
- District: Gurdaspur
- Tehsil: Dera Baba Nanak
- Region: Majha

Government
  - Type: Panchayat raj
  - Body: Gram panchayat

Area
  - Total: 215 ha (530 acres)

Population (2011)
  - Total: 963; 499/464 ♂/♀
  - Scheduled Castes: 74; 41/33 ♂/♀
  - Total Households: 188

Languages
  - Official: Punjabi
- Time zone: UTC+5:30 (IST)
- Telephone: 01871
- ISO 3166 code: IN-PB
- Website: gurdaspur.nic.in

Basant Kot is a village in Dera Baba Nanak in Gurdaspur district of Punjab State, India. It is located 15 kilometres (9.3 mi) from sub district headquarter and 45 kilometres (28 mi) from district headquarter. The village is administrated by Sarpanch an elected representative of the village.

== Demography ==
As of 2011, the village has a total number of 188 houses and a population of 963 of which 499 are males while 464 are females. According to the report published by Census India in 2011, out of the total population of the village 74 people are from Schedule Caste and the village does not have any Schedule Tribe population so far.

== See also ==
- List of villages in India
