= Manjit Indira =

Punjabi poet (born 1950)

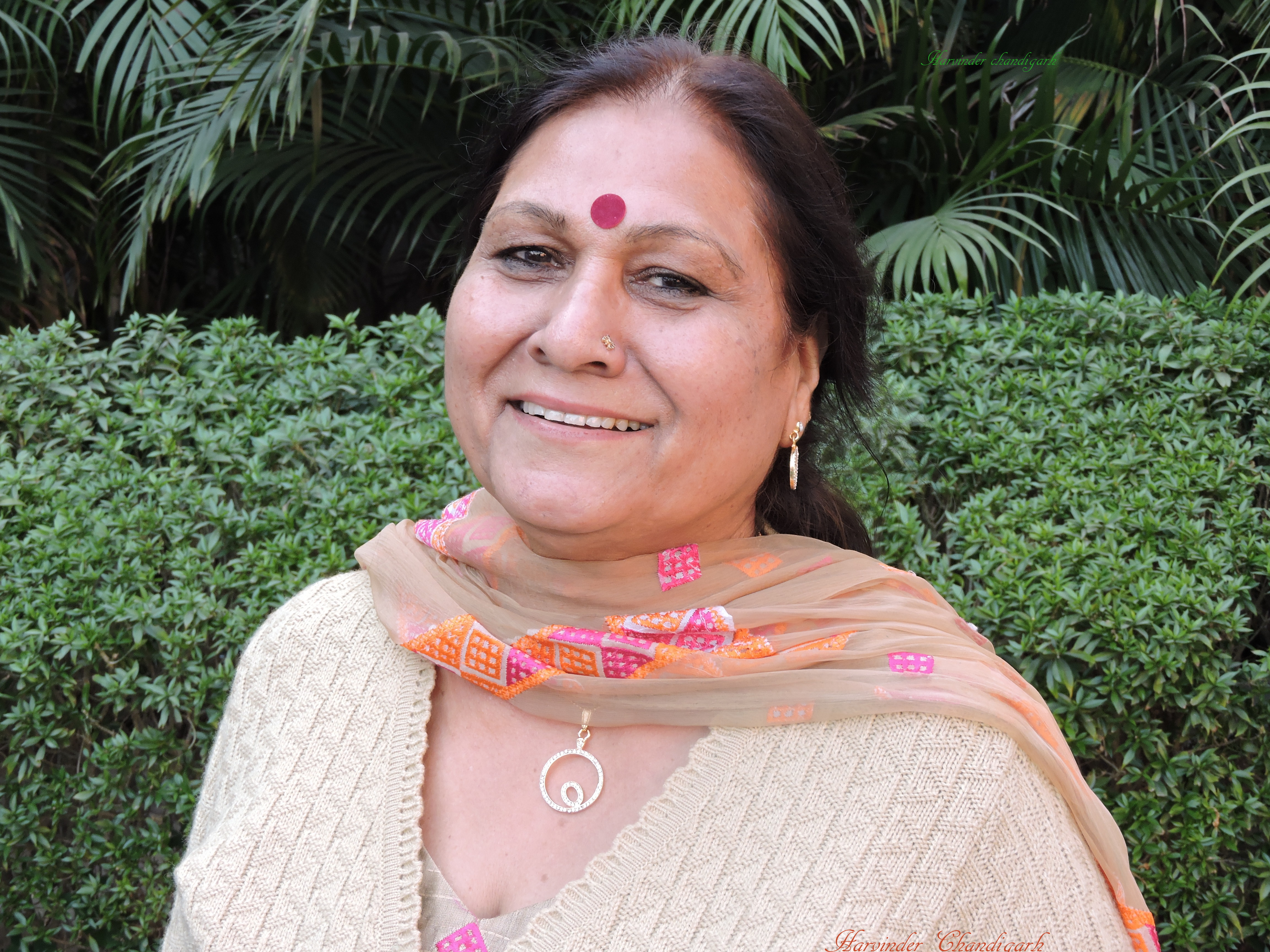
- Born: 24 February 1950 (age 76)
- Occupations: Poet; writer

Manjit Indira (born 24 February 1950) is an Indian poet and writer of Punjabi descent. Her first book, Antahkaran, was published in 1974.

== life ==
Manjit Indira was born to Harbhajan Singh Kalsi on 24 February 1950. She received her education up to M.A. (Punjabi), and MPhil.

== Books ==
=== Poetry collections ===
1. anthkaran 1974

2. Kala Bag 1986

3. Chandre Hanere 1992

4. Taryan Da Chhajj 1994,

  2023,2025

5. Poorti Apoorti 1996

6. Tu Awaz Mari Hai 2003,2025

  (Poetic Novel)

7. Alakh 2006

8. Roh Vidroh 2012

9. Taandav 2016

10.Saleeban 2022

Prose :

11.Teean Teej Deena

   (Details from 
    Folklore of Punjab) 
    1990

Criticism :-

12. Jang Hind Punjab Da -

  A Critical Study 
   1988

13. Shiv-Kav - Criticism

  1989

Translated Work :-

14. Twilight Zone (English)

  (Selected Poetry 
  Edited & Transcribed by 
  Pardeep Joshi) 2018

15.Tender Twinges (Romanian)

  (Selected Poetry 
  Edited & Translated by 
  Asror Allayarov) 2018

16.Safar Bin Manzil (Hindi)

  (Translation of Taryan 
  Da Chhajj into Hindi 
  by well known Urdu 
  Writer Janab Ratan 
  Singh)  2019

17.Taryan Da Chhajj

  (Shahmukhi - Urdu) 
   2022

18. Shiv Kav

  (Shahmukhi - Urdu) 
   2022

19. Popular Poem : "Buha

   Na Bari Na Koi 
   Banera" 

   Translated 
   into all State 
   Languages of India)
   2018

She Translated Books from other religional Languages into Punjabi Language (few of them popular books) :-

1. Jungle De Davedar

  (Bangla Novel) 
  Mahansaweta Devi 
  (For Language 
  Department Punjab)

2. Akhin Dekhi (Gijjubhai

  Badheka) Nehru Children 
 Library (NBT) 2008

3. Baraf De Aadmi

 (Suryanath Singh) Nehru 
  Children Library (NBT) 
  2009

4. Prithviraj Monga -

  Edited Stories (NBT) 
  2012

5. Lokan Nu Sarab-saresht

  Kiven Banaiye  (Elan 
  Loye Mengnis) (Lok 
  Geet Publications) 
  2012

6. Amiri Di Chabi

  (Napoleon Hill) (Lok 
  Geet Publications) 
  2013

7. Sheeshe Da Ghar -

  Vijay Rathore 
  (Transcribed into 
  Punjabi from Hindi - 
  Lok Geet Publications) 
  2015

8. Agan Sakhi (Malayalam

  Novel) - Lalithaminbka 
  Anterjanam (Sahitya 
  Akademi Delhi) 2017

9. Guandhi (Malayalam

  Novel) - P.Keshavdutt  
 (Sahitya Akademi Delhi) 
  2021
