= Amarjit Chandan =

Punjabi poet (born 1946)

- ਅਮਰਜੀਤ ਚੰਦਨ
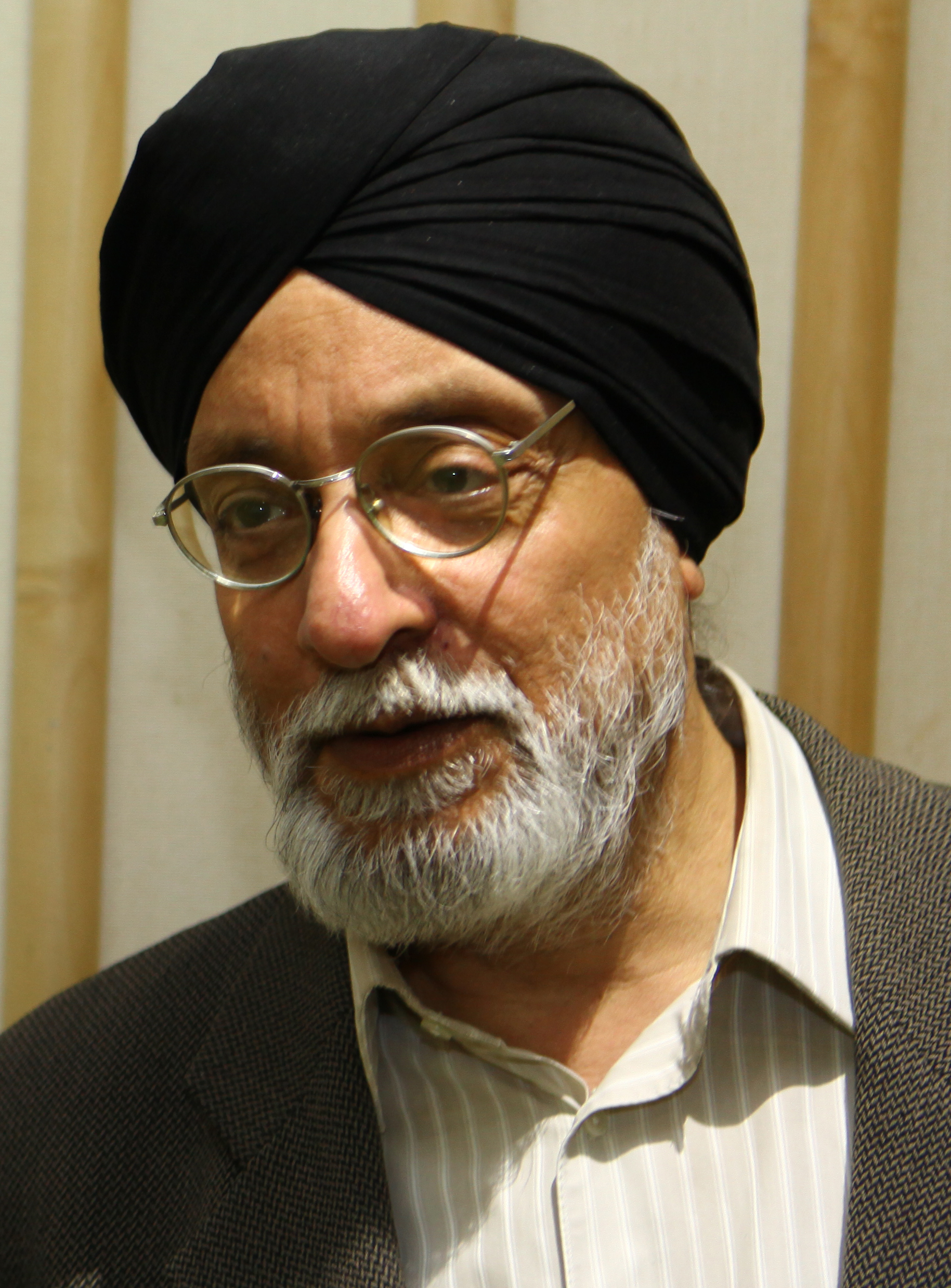
- Chandan in 2011
- Born: 1946 (age 79–80); Nairobi, Kenya
- Education: Panjab University, Chandigarh
- Writing career
- Language: Punjabi
- Genres: Poetry, essays
- Website: amarjitchandan.tripod.com/index.html

Signature
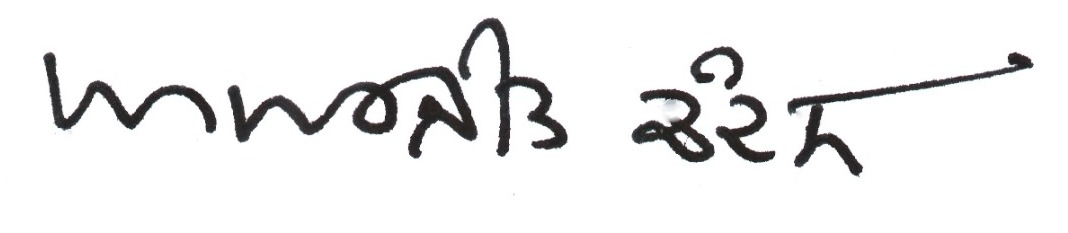

Amarjit Chandan (Punjabi: ਅਮਰਜੀਤ ਚੰਦਨ, born 1946) is a Punjabi writer, editor, translator, photographer and activist. He has written eight collections of poetry and six collections of essays in Punjabi. He has been called "the global face of modern Punjabi poetry".

He has published over 25 books of poetry and essays and has edited over 15 books of poetry and prose. His work has been translated into many languages including Arabic, Brazilian-Portuguese, Catalan, German, Greek, Italian, Slovene, Spanish and Turkish.

== Biography ==
=== Initial years in Kenya ===
He was born in Nairobi, Kenya in 1946 where his father Gopal Singh Chandan, worked in the railways as a carpenter and later on took up photography as full-time profession. He was also a leader of the clandestine Kenyan Ghadar Party, he worked as the general secretary of the Labour Trade Union of East Africa from 1940 to 1947 and the local Sikh community. He facilitated the travel of quite a few Ghadris through Kenya en route Moscow where they studied in the Communist University of the Toilers of the East (KUTV) also known as the Far East University. It was a revolutionary training school that operated under the umbrella of the Communist International and was in existence from 1921 until the late 1930s.

=== Move to (East) Punjab, India ===
In 1957 they moved to their ancestral town Nakodar in Punjab, India at the age of eight. He pursued higher studies at Panjab University, Chandigarh. Before Chandan joined the Maoist-Naxalite movement in East Punjab in 1971, he worked as a sub-editor in Nawan Zamana (New Age) daily newspaper published by the Punjabi communist party and later under Baba Gurmukh Singh of Lalton in Desh Bhagat Yadgar Jalandhar editing Yadgar's journal Desh Bhagat Yadan. He also edited a special issue of Bharat Sewak on Indian national freedom fighters and actively assisted with the publications of Yuvak Kender.

He joined the Maoist movement in Punjab in 1969 and started Dastavez (The Document), the first ever revolutionary underground literary magazine in Punjabi. It proved to be the trend setter of militant or Jujhar phase in the history of Punjabi literature. It introduced Lal Singh Dil, Pash, Sant Ram Udasi, Darshan Khatkar, Harbhajan Halvarvi and others. Because of Dastavez, he was proclaimed an offender during the Naxalite movement and carried a cash reward on his head. Later on he edited Lokyudh (People's War) and Baghawat (Revolt) political and literary magazines published by the CPI(ML) Punjab.

In August 1971, he was arrested in Amritsar and was tried on false charges of carrying bombs and bank robbery. He was given three years sentence and he underwent solitary confinement in Jalandhar and Amritsar jails.

After his release in August 1973 the first task he did was to collect letters of Shaheed Bhagat Singh and his comrades from National Archives New Delhi and other sources. These were published in Punjabi under the title Chithian: Shaheed Bhagat Singh te Sathi (Letters of Shahid Bhagat Singh & Comrades). He found and translated Bhagat Singh's famous article Why I am an Atheist. Since then it has been reprinted many times. He founded the Shaheed Bhagat Singh Research Committee. Its other members were Professors Bipan Chander, Bhagwan Josh, Harish Puri and Jagmohan Singh, Bhagat Singh's nephew. During 1977-1979 he researched under Bipan Chander, the historian, on the Pepsu Muzara Lehar (Land tenants’ militant movement of the Pepsu) fought under the leadership of the Lal Communist Party led by Teja Singh Sutantar. He edited Hem Jyoti when it was relaunched in 1974 under the Punjabi Sahit Sabhyachar Manch. Harbhajan Halvarvi and Pash were also on the editorial team. During 1977-80 he was also a correspondent from East Punjab for Economic & Political Weekly published in Bombay.

Chandan worked as an editor of Preet Lari during 1976-1977 and before that as the founding editor of short-lived literary magazine Disha (The Direction) published in Chandigarh.

A list of more than 100 naxalites killed in fake police encounters in East Punjab was published under his name in 1977. He was one of the founders of Jamhuri Adhikar Sabha Punjab (Association for the Protection of Democratic Rights, Punjab). In 1977 he was on the national Fact-Finding Team in Andhra Pradesh to investigate the murders of naxalites in police custody.

=== Migration to UK ===
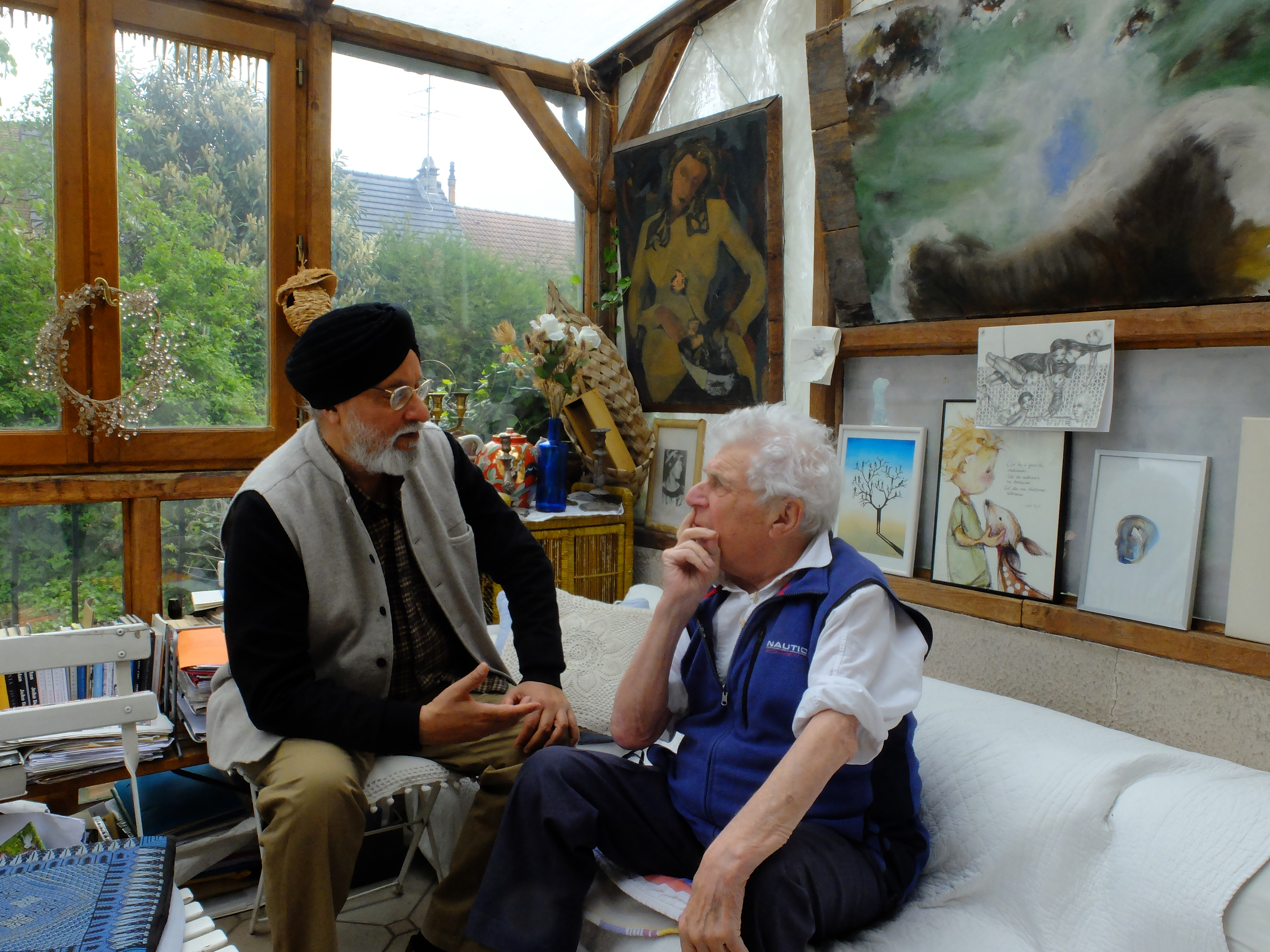
Amarjit Chandan and John Berger in 2016

In 1980, Chandan moved to the UK where he has been living ever since. He completed post-graduate Diploma in Translation with distinction from the Institute of Linguists in 1991. He was language consultant to the National Community Folklore Centre based at Middlesex Polytechnic. He worked as a part-time Lecturer in Punjabi at School of Languages, Polytechnic of Central London, 1983–1984. He worked for Translation & Interpreting Services, London Borough of Haringey from 1986 to 2003. He also translated for several publishing concerns, including the Indian Council of Historical Research, National Book Trust India, books of history, economics, fiction, non-fiction, children's literature, drama and poetry. He has translated works of Bertolt Brecht, Pablo Neruda, Yiannis Ritsos, Nazim Hikmet, John Berger and others into Punjabi.

His poems have appeared in magazines Al-Sabah (Baghdad, Iraq), Artrage, Assabah (Baghdad, Iraq), Atlas, Bazaar, Brand, Brittle Star, Critical Quarterly, The Independent, Index on Censorship, Modern Poetry in Translation, Poetry Review, Race Today, Wasafiri (UK), Little Magazine (India), Papirus and Akköy (Turkey), Erismus, Ombrela and Odos Panos (Greece), Lettre Internationale (Romania), Polichinello, Zunái e Modo de usar (Brazil), and Poetry International website.

Chandan’s short poem both in Punjabi and English engraved in 40-foot granite by Eric Peever is installed in a square in Slough High Street, UK.

He was one of ten British poets selected by Andrew Motion, the Poet Laureate, on BBC Radio 3 on National Poetry Day, 2001. He has participated in the Alderburgh, Ledbury, King’s Lynn, Winchester, Ó Bhéal poetry festivals and Poetry Parnassus in London in 2012. He represented the Punjab/UK in the International Literary Festival, Didim, Turkey in July 2006, Ljubljana (Slovenia) International Poetry Festival in 2015, Al-Marbed International Poetry Festival Basra Iraq in February 2017, Karachi Literary Festival in February 2018 and 6th Ó Bhéal Winter Warmer Poetry Festival, Cork City, Ireland (Nov 22nd - 25th 2018). He also participated in the Bradford Literature Festival (2016 and 2017) speaking on ‘WW1 and the Punjab’ and Partition respectively.

During World War 1 Centenary commemorations Chandan read his essay on Punjabi Folk Songs on WW1 at several events. In Edinburgh Art Festival Bani Abidi, Berlin-based acclaimed Pakistani artist, did a sound-sculpture Memorial to Lost Words on his poem on a Punjabi soldier’s letter written home set to music and sung by Ali Aftab Saeed. Chandan also wrote songs for musical The Troth (Dir. Gary Clarke, The Akademi, 2018. Based on Chandradhar Sharma Guleri’s classic Punjabi-Hindi story Uss ne kahaa tha was staged in London, New Delhi and other Indian cities.

He worked on a British Library Sound Archive Project Between Two Worlds: Non-Anglophone Poets in England: Readings and Histories recording more than 30 poets.

Chandan formed a long-term association with John Berger. On Berger's 90th birthday in 2016, he co-edited A Jar of Wild Flowers: Essays in Celebration of John Berger and anthology of poems by 90 poets The Long White Thread of Words.

=== Association with (West) Punjab, Pakistan ===
He is known as the bridge between East and West Punjabi literature. He co-edits with Zubair Ahmad an annual magazine in Punjabi Baramah (lit. ‘Twelve Months’ – a poetic genre) published in the Persian script in Lahore since 2019.

=== Archives ===
Chandan has donated much rare material and many sound recordings of his interviews with eminent writers, artists and activists including his correspondence with John Berger to the British Library, Wikimedia Commons, Panjab Digital Library, Chandigarh and Desh Bhagat Yadgar, Jalandhar.

In 1998 Chandan did oral history recordings of 12 early Punjabi immigrant workers in London for the Museum of London.

== Works ==
=== Works in Gurmukhi Punjabi ===
==== Poetry ====
- ਕੌਣ ਨਹੀਂ ਚਾਹੇਗਾ Kaun Nahin Chahega (1975)
- ਕਵਿਤਾਵਾਂ Kavitavan (1984)
- ਜੜ੍ਹਾਂ Jarhan (1995, Reprints 1998, 2006, 2023)
- ਬੀਜਕ Beejak (1996)
- ||ਛੰਨਾ|| Chhanna (1998)
- ਗੁੜ੍ਹਤੀ Gurhti (2000)
- ਅੰਨਜਲ Annjall (2006)
- ਪੈਂਤੀ Paintee (2009)
- ਪ੍ਰੇਮ ਕਵਿਤਾਵਾਂ Prem Kavitavan (2012)
- ਪਰਦੇਸੀ ਢੋਲਾ Pardesi Dhola (2013)
- ਲੰਮੀ ਲੰਮੀ ਨਦੀ ਵਹੈ Lammi Lammi Nadi Vahe (2014)
- ਸੱਚੀ ਟਕਸਾਲ Sachi Taksaal (2016)
- ਸੰਦੂਕ Sandook (2017)
- ਏਹ ਕਾਗਦ ਨਹੀਂ ਹੈ: ਗ਼ਦਰ ਵਿਰਾਸਤ ਦੀਆਂ ਲਿਖਤਾਂ Eh kāgad nahin hai: Ghadar virasat diān likhtān (2020)
- ਰਿਜ਼ਕ Rizq (2021)

==== Essays ====
- ਫੈਲਸੂਫੀਆਂ Failsufian (1990)
- ਨਿਸ਼ਾਨੀ Nishani (1997)
- ਹੁਣ ਖਿਣ: ਸੋਹਨ ਕਾਦਰੀ ਨਾਲ਼ ਬਚਨ ਬਿਲਾਸ Hun Khin: Sohan Qadri nāl bachan-bilās Conversations with Sohan Qadri (2001); The Now Moment: Conversations with Sohan Qadri, Translated from Punjabi by Rajesh Sharma (2025)
- ਪੋਟਲ਼ੀ Potli (2009)
- ਲਿਖਤ ਪੜਤ Likhat Parhat (2013, Reprint 2014)
- ਸਾਕਾਰ Sakār (2020)
- ਦੁੱਧ ਵਿਚ ਕਾਂਜੀ: ਪੰਜਾਬੀ ਦਾ ਸੱਤਿਆਨਾਸ Dudh vich Kānji: Punjabi da Satyanās (2024)
- ਬਚਨ ਬਿਲਾਸ: ਸਤ ਸਿਆਣਿਆਂ ਨਾਲ਼ ਗੱਲਾਂ Bachan-Bilās: Sat SianiāN nāl GallāN (2024) Conversations with seven Punjabi writers
- ਜੀਵਨਪਤ੍ਰੀ Jeevanpatri, Memoirs (2025)
- ਲਿਖ੍ਯਤੇ Likhayte (2026)

==== Translated and edited works ====
- ਮੇਰਾ ਨਾਮ ਤੇਰਾ ਨਾਮ ਵੀਅਤਨਾਮ Mera Nam Tera Nam Vietnam, anthology of Vietnamese poetry (1968)
- ਮਿੱਟੀ ਦਾ ਰੰਗ Mitti da Rung, first anthology of naxal Punjabi poems (1971)
- ਦੋ ਕਿਨਾਰੇ Do Kināré, British Punjabi short fiction (1982)
- ਅਪਣੇ ਆਪ ਤੋਂ ਦੂਰ Apne aap ton dur British Punjabi poetry (1984)
- ਵਲਾਇਤੀਏ Vilaytiye Short history of Indians in Britain (1986)
- ਖਿਲਰੇ ਹੋਏ ਵਰਕੇ: ਪਾਸ਼ ਦੀ ਅਣਛਪੀ ਕਵਿਤਾ Khillrey hoe varke: Pash's scattered poems (1989)
- ਪਾਸ਼ ਦੀਆਂ ਚਿੱਠੀਆਂ Pash diaN ChithiaN Letters of Pash (1990)
- ਗੁਲਪਾਸ਼: ਪਾਸ਼ ਦੀ ਚੋਣਵੀਂ ਰਚਨਾ Gulpash: Pash di chnveeN Rchna Selected Writings (1991)
- ਅਪਣੇ ਆਪ ਨਾਲ਼ ਗੱਲਾਂ: ਪਾਸ਼ ਦੀ ਡਾਇਰੀ Apne aap naal gallaaN: Pash's Journals (1993)
- ਹਬੀਬ ਜਾਲਿਬ ਦੀ ਪੰਜਾਬੀ ਸ਼ਾਇਰੀ Habib Jalib di Punjabi Shairi Habib Jalib's Punjabi poetry (2003)
- ਮੇਰੀ ਆਪ-ਬੀਤੀ: ਬਾਬਾ ਸੋਹਨ ਸਿੰਘ ਭਕਨਾ Meri Aap-Beeti, Autobiography of Baba Sohan Singh Bhakna (2014)
- ਉੱਨੀ ਸੌ ਚੁਰਾਸੀ Unni sau churasi: Harbhajan Singh's Poems and Essays on 1984 (2017)
- ਸੰਨ ਸੰਤਾਲ਼ੀ: ਪੰਜਾਬ ਦੇ ਉਜਾੜੇ ਦੀ ਸ਼ਾਇਰੀ San Santali: Punjab de Ujarhey di shayri Punjabi Poetry on the 1947 Holocaust (2017)
- ਕੰਚਨ ਕਾਇਆ: ਅਜੋਕੀ ਪੰਜਾਬੀ ਪ੍ਰੇਮ ਕਵਿਤਾ Kanchan Kaya: Ajoki Punjabi Prem Kavita Modern Punjabi Love Poetry (2023)
- ਅੱਜ ਦੇ ਦਿਨ: ਮੁਨੀਰ ਨਿਆਜ਼ੀ ਦੀ ਪੰਜਾਬੀ ਸ਼ਾਇਰੀ Ajj de Din: Munir Niazi di Punjabi Shairi (2023)
- ਜਾਦੂਨਗਰੀ: ਮਜ਼ਹਰ ਤਿਰਮਜ਼ੀ ਦੀ ਚੋਣਵੀਂ ਸ਼ਾਇਰੀ Jadunagari: Mazhar Tirmazi di ChonveeN Shairi (2023)
- ਸੰਗੀਤਸਰ: ਸੰਗੀਤ ਬਾਰੇ ਰਚਨਾਵਾਂ Sangeetsar: Sangeet bārey rachnavāN (2024)
- ਸਦਾ ਨਮਸਕਾਰੁ: ਗੁਰੂ ਨਾਨਕ ਕੇ ਸੋਹਿਲੇ Sada Namaskar: Guru Nanak ke Sohiley, Praise Poetry by 67 Modern Punjabi Poets for Guru Nanak (2024)
- ਸਿਰਲੇਖ: ਵੀਹਵੀਂ ਸਦੀ ਦੇ ਪੰਜਾਬੀ ਨਿਬੰਧ Sirlekh: 20veen sadee de nibandh 20th Century Punjabi Essays, National Book Trust India (2025)
- ਜਸ਼ਨ ਹਯਾਤੀ: ਖ਼ੁਸ਼ੀ ਤੇ ਖੇੜੇ ਦੀ ਕਵਿਤਾ Jashan Hayati: Khushi te khede di kavita. Happy Poems by 50 Punjabi poets (2025)
- ਵੀਹ ਵਿਸਵੇ: 20veen sadee dian shahkar Punjabi kahanian. 20th Century 20 Best Punjabi Short Stories, National Book Trust India (2026)

=== Works in Punjabi (Persian script) ===
==== Poetry ====
- ਗੁੱਥਲੀ Guthli (1999)
- ਅਨਾਰਾਂ ਵਾਲ਼ਾ ਵਿਹੜਾ AnaraN vala Vehrha (2001)
- ਨੁਕ਼ਤਾ Nuqta (2007)

==== Essays ====
- ਲਿਖਤਮ ਪੜਤਮ Likhtam Parhtam (2009)
- ਦੁੱਧ ਵਿਚ ਕਾਂਜੀ: ਪੰਜਾਬੀ ਦਾ ਸੱਤਿਆਨਾਸ Dudh vich Kānji: Punjabi da Satyanās (2025)

=== Works in English ===
- The Parrot, the Horse and the Man (2017)
- Sonata For Four Hands, Preface by John Berger (2010)
- Indians in Britain (1986)

==== Edited works ====
- A Jar of Wild Flowers: Essays in Celebration of John Berger (2016), co-edited with Yasmin Gunaratnam, London: Zed Books
- The Long White Thread of Words: Poems for John Berger (2016), co-edited with Gareth Evans and Yasmin Gunaratnam. Ripon: Smokestack Books

=== Works translated in other languages ===
- ΦΟΡΕΣΕΜΕ (2015) - translation in Greek by Christina Linardaki & Andreas Pitsillides
- رسالةٌتصلُمتأخرةً (A Letter Reaches Late) 2021. Selected poems in Arabic translation by Abdulkareem Kasid, Cairo: Arweqah
- A foto não mostra o nó na sua garganta (2025) [A photo doesn't show lump in your throat] Selected 30 poems by Amarjit Chandan published in Brazil-Portuguese. Edited & Translated by Ana Amaliá Alves. Trilingual edition: Punjabi English Portuguese. Pages 80. Sao Paulo, Brazil: Solte o Verbo! Linguas. ISBN 978-65-991241-2-9

== Awards ==
- Lifetime Achievement Award - Languages Department, Punjab, India
- Anād Kāv Sanmān in 2009
- Lifetime Achievement Award from the Punjabis in Britain, All-Party Parliamentary Group, London in 2006

== In film TV & Music ==
- Video: A short film by Kuldip Powar and Madi Boyd on Amarjit Chandan's two poems on ਮੋਰ مور Peacock (2012)
- Awazzan (2019) - a documentary film by Gurvinder Singh.
- Likhat (Lahore, 2009) - Interview by Mandana Zaidi. Directed by Syed Wajahat Hussain
- An archive film on him was made by the University of California, Santa Barbara in May 2007.
- Chandan’s poems and lyrics have been put to music by Saira Altaf, Mritunjay Awasthi, Arieb Azhar (Islamabad), Jasbir Jassi, Anjana Kaul, Ali Aftab Saeed (Beygairat Brigade Lahore), Shrikant Shriram, Harpreet Singh and Madan Gopal Singh.
- Greek composer Andreas Pitsillides an alumnus of the Guildhall School of Music and Drama London set Chandan's poetry to instrumental music.
