= Pritam Singh Kasad =

Punjabi poet

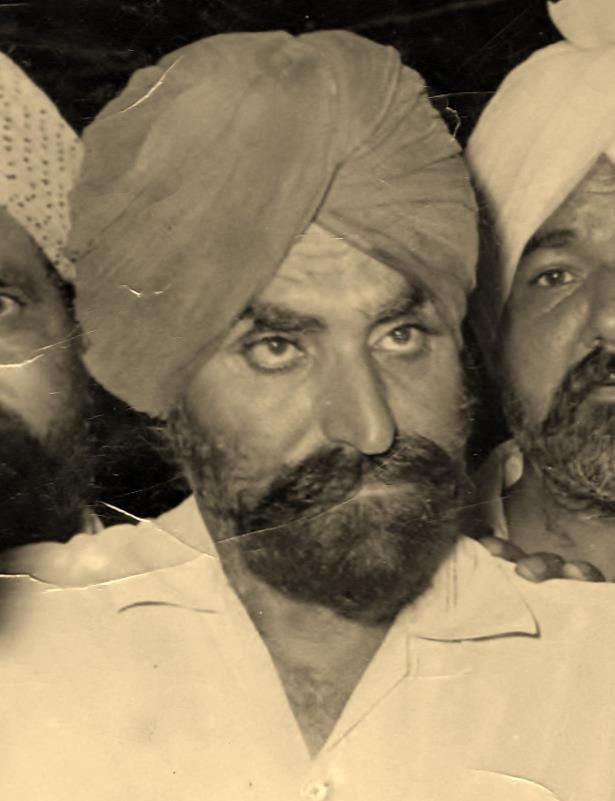
Kasad in his youth

Pritam Singh Sahni, or "Kasad" (1924–2008) was a Punjabi poet from New Delhi, India. Kasad was active in Punjabi Kavi circles. He authored more than 20 books of Punjabi poetry and was also a playwright.

== Early life ==
Kasad's family moved from Gah, Pakistan during Partition of India in 1947. Although he struggled to support his family and settle in a new place, he was able to write poetry and to participate in gatherings all over India. In 1962, Kasad received a letter of appreciation from Jawaharlal Nehru and, in 1999, he was part of the Kavi Darbar celebrating the birthday of Atal Bihari Vajpayee. Kasad had two sons and four daughters.

In 2022, on his 14th death anniversary, Jassi released a track reciting one of his classic poems.

== Works ==
- Aazadi De Vedi tei, November 1956, a collection of patriotic poems.
- Jaag Manukhata Jaag, November 1958, a collection of social reform poems
- Kesri Nishan, April 1961, poems on sovereignty in Sikhism
- Kharag Khalsa, January 1986, poems describing the glory of Khalsa Panth
- Rutan de Parchawe, 1990, a collection of romantic poems.

== Translated works ==
- Kharag Khalsa, April 2018, rendition of 54 Punjabi poems into poetic English translation, by Tarundeep Singh (Bobby) ISBN 978-81-7010-422-3 (Publisher: Sanbun Hemkunt Publishers, New Delhi)
