= Aulakh, Muktsar =

Aulakh
- Village
- Location within Punjab Location within India
- Coordinates: 30°16′43″N 74°30′43″E
- Country: India
- District: Sri Muktsar Sahib

Government
  - Body: Panchayat
- Elevation: 50 m (160 ft)

Population (2011)
  - Total: 2,500

Languages
  - Official: Punjabi
- Time zone: UTC+5:30 (IST)
- PIN: 152112
- Telephone code: (+91) 01637

Aulakh is a small village in Punjab, India. It lies in the tahsil (sub-district) of Malout and in the district of Sri Muktsar Sahib. It has an estimated population of only 2500. The place has three religious places, comprising one gurdwara sahib and two other places.

== Demographics ==
As of 2011, the village had a total population of 2576, comprising 1365 males and 1211 females. The sex ratio in the village is 885 females per 1000 males. The literate ratio in the village is 200 for males and 55 for females.

== Education ==
In terms of education, this village is a hub for all the other villages in the neighborhood. Aulakh has one government school and four other private schools.
