= Jeet Aulakh =

Indian poet (born 1971)

Jeet Aulakh (born 18 December 1971 Punjab, India) is a Canadian Contemporary Artist and Poet.

== Life ==
He graduated from Panjab University, in Chandigarh, India with a BA in 1993. He has lived and worked in Toronto and Windsor, Ontario since the late 1990s. Contained with spirituality and deep meditation, he emphasizes on what he calls "Pure Painting". Aulakh's work has been exhibited at major Canadian public galleries and museums, including the Art Gallery of Windsor and McIntosh Gallery London. His works are in public collections including the City of Toronto, University of Windsor and University of Western Ontario. He writes poetry mainly in Punjabi, his native language.

== Sources ==
- Patten, James; Salter, Mandy. "Anahada Naada" Exhibition Catalogue, Art Gallery of Windsor, McIntosh Gallery, 2010. ISBN 978-0-919837-81-2
- South Asian Ensemble, Vol 2 Number 3, PG 136
- Sanjh quarterly Punjabi magazine, Vol-1, April 2007, PG 86
