= Lutf Ali =

Lutf Ali (Note: Punjabi: لطف علی) (1716–1794) was an 18th-century poet from Bahawalpur, Punjab, active in the Saraiki language. He was born in the village of Mao in present-day Rahim Yar Khan District. He wrote the popular narrative poem Saifalnāma in 1781 based on a tale from the One Thousand and One Nights.

== Bibliography ==
- Shackle, Christopher (1976). The Siraiki language of central Pakistan : a reference grammar. London: School of Oriental and African Studies.
- Wagha, Muhammad Ahsan (1997). The development of Siraiki language in Pakistan (Ph.D.). School of Oriental and African Studies. Archived from the original on February 14, 2017. (requires registration).
