= Mian Muhammad Bakhsh =

Punjabi Sufi poet (c. 1830–1907)

- میاں محمد بخش
- Born: c. 1830; Khari Sharif, Sikh Empire (present-day Azad Jammu and Kashmir, Pakistan)
- Died: 22 January 1907; Khari Sharif, Jammu and Kashmir, British India (present-day Azad Jammu and Kashmir, Pakistan)
- Resting place: Shrine of Mian Muhammad Bakhsh, Khari Sharif
- Occupation: Poet
- Years active: Mid-19th century – early-20th century
- Era: Colonial India
- Movement: Classical Punjabi Sufi poetry
- Father: Mīān Shamsuddīn
- Writing career
- Pen name: Mīān Muhammad Bakhshā
- Language: Punjabi; Persian (Note: Most of Bakhsh's work is in the Punjabi language with the exception of his book "Yari", which he wrote in Persian.)
- Genres: Love; divine love; Islamic mysticism; society; nature; self-reflection; Nazm; Kafi; Ghazal
- Notable work: Sayful Mulūk (his book of poetry)

Mian Muhammad Bakhsh (Punjabi: میاں محمد بخش, pronounced [miãː mʊɦəˈməd̪ bəxʃ]; c. 1830 – 22 January 1907) was a Punjabi Sufi poet, from Khari Sharif in present-day Azad Kashmir. He wrote 18 books during his lifetime of 77 years, and is especially remembered for his Saiful Maluk, a Punjabi poetic rendering of the traditional Arabic story of Prince Saiful Maluk. He also wrote the romantic tragedy, Mirza Sahiban. Most of his work is in Punjabi, (Note: Most of Bakhsh's work is in the Majhi and Pothwari dialects of Punjabi) with the exception of the book "Yari", written in Persian.

Mian Muhammad Bakhsh is revered throughout the Punjab, Hazara and Azad Kashmir. He is regarded as the bridge between medieval and early-modern Punjabi literature.

== Early life ==
Bakhsh was born in c. 1830 in Khari Sharif (present-day Azad Jammu and Kashmir, Pakistan) during the Sikh rule, into a Punjabi Gujar Poswal family of the Banian clan with roots in Gujrat (present-day Punjab, Pakistan). There is considerable disagreement about his year of birth. Mahbūb 'Alī Faqīr Qādirī, in a biography printed as an appendix to the text of Sayful Mulūk gives the date as 1246 AH (1830 AD), a date also followed by the Shāhkār Islāmī Encyclopedia; 1830 and 1843 are suggested in other works. Mīān Muhammad Bakhsh himself states in his magnum opus, Sayful Mulūk, that he completed the work in the month of Ramadan, 1279 AH (1863 AD), and that he was then thirty-three years of age. Hence, he must have been born in 1829 or 1830.

== Upbringing ==
He was brought up in a very religious environment, and received his early education at home. He was later sent with his elder brother, Mīān Bahāval, to the nearby village of Samwal Sharīf to study religious sciences, especially the science of Hadith in the madrassah of Hāfiz Muhammad 'Alī. His teacher was Hāfiz Ghulam Hussain. Hāfiz Muhammad 'Alī had a brother, Hāfiz Nāsir, who was a majzub, and had renounced worldly matters; this dervish resided at that time in the mosque at Samwal Sharīf. From childhood Mīān Muhammad had exhibited a penchant for poetry, and was especially fond of reading Yūsuf ō Zulaikhā by Jami. During his time at the madrassah, Hāfiz Nāsir would often beg him to sing some lines from Jami's poetry, and upon hearing it so expertly rendered would invariably fall into a state of spiritual intoxication.

Mīān Muhammad was still only fifteen years old when his father, falling seriously ill, and realizing that he was on his deathbed, called all his students and local notaries to see him. Mīān Shamsuddīn told his visitors that it was his duty to pass on the spiritual lineage that he had received through his family from Pīr-e Shāh Ghāzī Qalandar Damriyan Wali Sarkar; he pointed to his own son, Mīān Muhammad, and told those assembled that he could find nobody more suitable than he to whom he might award this privilege. Everybody agreed, the young man's reputation had already spread far and wide. Mīān Muhammad, however, spoke up and disagreed, saying that he could not bear to stand by and allow his elder brother Bahāvul to be deprived of the honour. The old man was filled with so much love for his son that he stood up and leaving his bed grasped his son by the arms; he led him to one corner and made him face the approximate direction of Baghdad, and then he addressed the founder of their Sufi Order, Shaikh Abdul Qadir Gilani, presenting his son to him as his spiritual successor. Shortly after this incident his father died. Mīān Muhammad continued to reside in his family home for a further four years, then at the age of nineteen he moved into the khānqāh, where he remained for the rest of his life. Both his brothers combined both religion and worldly affairs in their lives, but he was only interested in spirituality, and never married unlike them.

== Poetic talents and works ==
Saif ul Malūk (1863) is considered his masterpiece. In its ending verses, Mian Muhammad Bakhsh listed major genres of Punjabi poetry and his predecessor Punjabi poets:

The land of Punjab has had many poets full of wisdom, who have composed brilliant kāfīs, bārāṅmāhs, dohṛās and baits. Some have composed and written books, qissas and risālas. Where now has that company gone, Muhammad? Look and take careful stock.

First is Shaikh Farid Shakarganj, true knower and possessor of sainthood. Every utterance of his tongue is a guide on the true path.

Then there was a Sultan Bahu, a special hero in the cause of truth. The dohṛās which he uttered shine out in both worlds.

On listening to the kāfīs of Bullhe Shah, inner unbelief is broken. He swims about in the ocean of Oneness.

— Saif ul Malūk (1863)

Once he had advanced a little along the Sufi way, he became more and more interested in composing poetry, and one of the first things he penned was a qasidah (quatrain) in praise of his spiritual guide. Initially he preferred to write siharfis and duhras, but then he advanced to composing stories in verse. His poetry is written in a mixed language composed of the Majhi, Pothohari and Hindko dialects of Punjabi, and utilizes a rich vocabulary of Persian and Arabic loan-words. Mian Muhammad Bakhsh, in his lifetime, contributed his great mystic thought in the language of the masses – Punjabi language which was also his mother tongue.

His works include: Siharfi, Sohni Mahiwal, Tuhfah-e Miran, Tuhfah-e- Rasuliyah, Shirin Farhad, Mirza Sahiban, Sakhi Khavass Khan, Shah Mansur, Gulzar-e Faqir, Hidayatul Muslimin, Panj Ganj, Masnavi-e Nīrang-e ‘Ishq. He also wrote a commentary on the Arabic Qasidat al-Burda of al-Busiri and his most famous work, entitled Safar-ul-Ishq (Journey of Love), but better known as Saif ul Maluk.

== Formal pledge of allegiance ==
Despite the fact that he had essentially been made a khalīfah of his father, he realized that he still needed to make a formal pledge of allegiance or bay'ah to a Sufi master. Having completed his formal education he began to travel, seeking out deserted locations where he would busy himself in prayer and spiritual practices, shunning the company of his fellow-men. He took the Sufi pledge of allegiance or bay'ah with Ghulām Muhammad, who was the khalīfah of Bābā Badūh Shāh Abdāl, the khalīfah of Hājī Bagāsher (of Darkālī Mamuri Sharīf, near Kallar Syedan District Rawalpindi), the khalīfah again of Dumriyan Wali Sarkar. He is also said to have travelled for a while to Srinagar, where he benefitted greatly from Shaikh Ahmad Valī.

== Death and legacy ==
He died on the 7th day of the Islamic month of Dhu al-Hijjah 1324 AH (1907 AD), and was buried in Khari Sharif, not far away from his spiritual great great grandfather, Damriyan Wali Sarkar. To this day many people visit his tomb with the intention of receiving spiritual blessings.

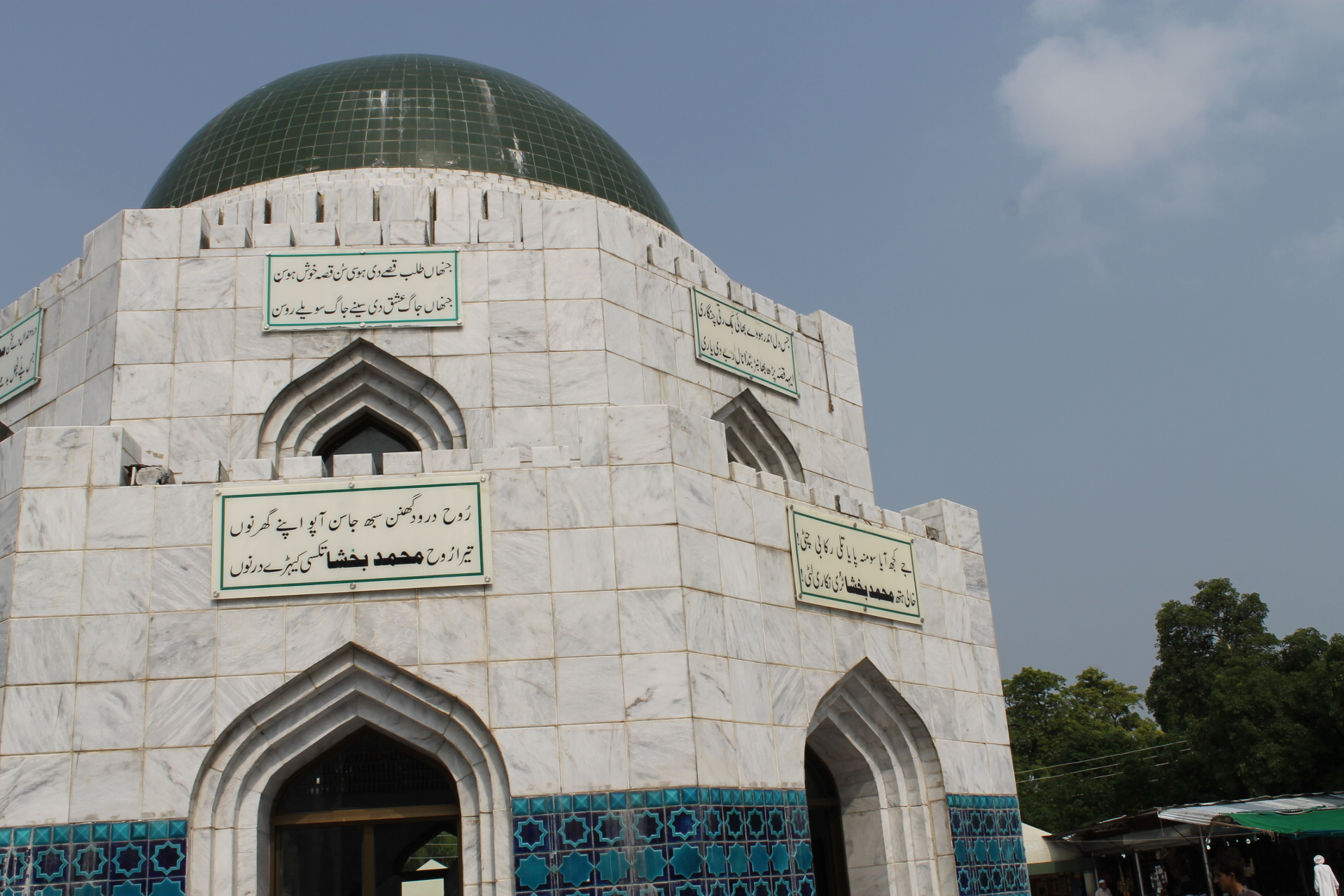
Shrine of Mian Muhammad Bakhsh at Khari Sharif, Azad Kashmir, Pakistan.

In February 2016, rich tributes were paid to Mian Muhammad Bakhsh at a literary seminar held at Allama Iqbal Open University, Islamabad, Pakistan. Speakers at the seminar included scholar Fateh Muhammad Malik. He said that Mian Muhammad Bakhsh, through his poetry, spread the message of mutual harmony and brotherhood of mankind. He added that the young generation should seek aspirations from the national heroes and eminent literary personalities like him. Mian Muhammad Bakhsh serves as a guiding force to develop a happy and successful life.
