= Mir Tanha Yousafi =

Pakistani writer (1955–2019)

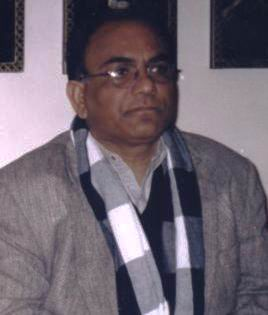
- Born: Muhammad Saleh; 1 January 1955; Sialkot, Pakistan
- Died: 26 August 2019 (aged 64)

Mir Tanha Yousufi (Note: Punjabi/Urdu: میر تنہا یوسفی) (1 January 1955 – 26 August 2019) was a Pakistani Punjabi and Urdu writer, best known for his works in Punjabi literature. He produced two short story collections and five novels in Punjabi. Most of his work was transliterated in Gurumukhi script in Indian Punjab. Besides his Punjabi works, he was an Urdu and Punjabi poet.

== Early life ==
He was born on 1 January 1955 in Adam Ke Cheema village, Daska Tehsil, Sialkot District, Punjab, Pakistan.

== Literary life ==
Mir Tanha Yousufi started writing as an Urdu poet. Since 1972, when he was an undergraduate science student, he kept sending his ghazals and poems to various literary magazines and literary pages of national news papers.

=== Work in Urdu ===
From 1986 onwards he continued contributing poems, ghazals and short stories to Urdu magazines including: “Fanoon (Lahore)” edited by late Ahmed Nadeem Qasimi, “Takhleeq (Lahore)” edited by Azhar Javed, "Moaasir (Lahore)” edited by Ata-ul-Haq Qasimi, “Adabiyat (Pakistan Academy of Letters' quarterly magazine) and “Kitab (Literary magazine of Pakistan Book Foundation).

==== Urdu poetry ====
His first Urdu poetry collection “Luknat (Fumbling)" was published in 1996. It contains modern as well as traditionally styled ghazals with a handful of poems (free versed as well as metered). The book was received with a critical acclaim and appreciation from the contemporary men of letters.

Second collection of Urdu poetry is ready to go to the press. The contents of this book would be styled similar to the "Luknat". A good portion of this next Urdu poetry collection has already been contributed to various magazines.

==== Urdu prose ====
Although Yousufi had a good number of Urdu short stories; both in post modern and plain traditional style, yet the matter is not sufficient to be presented in the form of a book. He believed in quantity, yet he felt that quality is of prime importance which is a must for any creative piece of work. A few of his Urdu Afsanas were published in magazines.

== Punjabi work ==
Punjabi being his mother tongue; it was but natural to keep moving between Urdu poetry to Punjabi poetry. This drove him to write Punjabi prose as well, which he did with consistency and ended up with the publication of his first book in Punjabi. Some of these magazines are listed as: “Sver International” edited by Jamil Paul, “Rvel” and “Meeti” edited by Ilyas Ghumman, “Lehraan” edited by Akhter Hussain Akhter and "Pancham" edited by Saqib Maqsood.

=== Punjabi prose ===
Yousufi's first Punjabi short story collection “Sooraj Uggan Taa’en [Till the Sun Rises]" was published in 1996. This book proved to be his introduction in Punjabi literary world.

And here entered Ilyas Ghumman in his life. Ilyas Ghumman, an electrical engineer by profession, is a Lahore-based renowned Punjabi writer, worker and publisher. He has a world fame for organizing events regarding the development and progress of Punjabi language, literature and culture. He asked Yousufi to try his pen for writing down some novelette/novel. This suggestion of Ghumman drove Mir Tanha Yousufi to produce his first Punjabi novel

==== Treh ====
“Treh {Thirst}" in 1998. Fluently written, clear in thoughts, rushing story lines and the purity of the language made this book a surprise for the Punjabi readers.

==== Ik Samadar Paar ====
Seeing the response on "Treh", Mir Tanha Yousufi was asked for more. Thus his second novel "Ik Samandar Paar [Across One Sea]", published in 2000, won the prestigious Punjabi literary award from "Masood Khaddar Posh Trust".

==== Khiddoo ====
Taking further courage, he penned down his next novel "Khiddoo [The Cotton Ball]"; which won the award from "Masood Khaddar Posh Trust" for the second time, in the year 2002.

=== Kaalaa Chaanan ===
During all these years of writing "Treh", "Ik Samandar Paar" and "Khiddoo", along with his activities in other Urdu and Punjabi writings (both poetry and prose), he had been thinking of writing a saga in Punjabi language, using research work, knowledge of the history and geography of the backdrop locale of the novel, the study of the civilization, culture and anthropology of the area. He then wrote his Pakistan's "National Literary Award, 2005" or "Syed Waris Shah Award, 2005" winner Punjabi novel "Kaalaa Chaanan [Black Light]"; which is 728 pages. When "Masood Khaddar Posh Trust's Award" for 2005 was made public; "Kaalaa Chaanan" was declared a winner and Yousufi became a writer who had won "Masood Khaddar Posh Trust's Award" three times in a row.

To cater the demand of Punjabi loving people, the short stories written after "Sooraj Uggan Taen" were collected. These stories had been published in various Punjabi magazines and kept making waves all these years due to style, language and intellect. The book was named "Tae Faer [Then What?]"and was published in 2005.

This book picked up "Pakistan Writers' Guild Punjab's Best Prose Book in Punjabi printed in 2005. The same book was judged for "Razia Farrukh Kahani Award, 2005" and was announced the Best Short Stories' Book of the year.

===== 2005, a milestone =====
2005 remains a milestone and memorable year for Mir Tanha Yousufi's writing career with 4 awards on two books.

==== Annha Khooh ====
His latest novel "Annha Khooh [Abandoned Well]" was published in 2008 and this novel too, got "Masood Khaddar Posh Trust's Award". This makes Mir Tanha Yousufi a unique writer with 4 consecutive Masood Khaddar Posh Trust Awards.

=== Punjabi poetry ===
A lot of Yousufi's Punjabi poetry was published in various Punjabi magazines in Pakistan. Being well known as a poet, his readers were awaiting his overdue collection of poetry.

== Works ==
- Luknat ([Stutter]), Urdu Poetry (1996)
- Sooraj Uggan Taa'en (Till the Sun Rises), Punjabi short story collection (1996)
- Treh (Thirst), Punjabi Novel (1998)
- Ik Samandar Paar (Across one sea), Punjabi Novel (2000)
- Lucknat, Urdu Poetry (2002)
- Khiddoo (The Cotton Ball), Punjabi Novel (2002)
- Tae Faer (Then What?), Punjabi Novel (2005)
- Kaalaa Chaanan (Black Light), Punjabi Novel (2006)
- Annha Khooh (Abandoned Well), Punjabi Novel (2008)

== The outcome ==
1: Transliteration of his Punjabi novels (which are published in Shahmukhi or Urdu Script in Pakistan) into Gurumukhi (the East Punjab Script of India) has already taken place. This, in a way, shows the popularity of his writings across the borders.
2: He has been invited to visit various literary gatherings around the world, especially India and UK, but could not manage due to his uncertain work schedule as Geologist in the field.
3: "Ik Samadar Paar" has been approved as "extra study book" for M.A. Punjabi Literature's exams at Guru Nanak Dev University, India.
4: Many of his short stories have been published in India and other countries where Punjabi in read and spoken. 5: A good number of his short stories have been included in many "Best Short Stories of Punjabi" selections, both in Pakistan and elsewhere.
6: Some of his Punjabi short stories have been translated in Pakistan's national language, Urdu.

Academy of letters

== Awards ==
- "Ik Samadar Paar [Across One Sea]", published in 2000, won the prestigious Punjabi literary award from "Masood Khaddar Posh Trust".
- "Khiddoo [The Cotton Ball]" won the award from "Masood Khaddar Posh Trust" in the year 2002.
- "Kaalaa Chaanan (Black Light)" won the "Masood Khaddar Posh Award" in 2005.
- "Kaalaa Chaanan [Black Light]" won Pakistan's "National Literary Award, 2005" {also called "Syed Waris Shah Award"}.
- "Tae Faer [Then What?]" published in 2005, picked up "Razia Farrukh Kahani Award", being the Best Short Stories' Book of the year.
- "Tae Faer [Then What?]" won the "Pakistan Writers' Guild, Punjab" Award for 2005 as the Best Prose Book in Punjabi.
- "Annha Khooh (Abandoned Well)" won the "Masood Khaddar Posh Award" in 2008.
