= Aizaz Ahmad Azar =

Pakistani poet, writer

- Born: 1942; Batala, Punjab, British India
- Died: 16 May 2015 (aged 72–73); Lahore, Punjab, Pakistan
- Resting place: Karim Block cemetery, Allama Iqbal Town, Lahore
- Citizenship: Pakistani
- Education: University of Punjab
- Occupations: Poet, writer
- Writing career
- Pen name: Aizaz
- Language: Urdu, Punjabi
- Years active: 19xx–2015
- Period: Pakistan military era, Coup d'état
- Genres: Gazal, Naat, Nazm, Manqabat, Kafi
- Subjects: Sufi, Love, Social

Aizaz Ahmad Azar (Punjabi, Urdu: اعزاز احمد آذر c. 1942 – 16 May 2015; sometimes spelled Ezaz or Aizaz Ahmed Azar), also known by his pen name Aizaz, was a Pakistani Urdu, Punjabi poet and writer. Aizaz wrote ten to sixteen books on poetry, including gazals, nazms and several other books on Sufi devotional poems and social issues.

== Early life ==
Aizaz was born in 1942 in Batala, Punjab, British India. He earned a Bachelor of Laws degree from the University of Punjab, and later he obtained a master's degree in Punjabi and was awarded a gold medal. He was possibly an Indian immigrant who later settled in Pakistan following the Partition of India. His initial career in poetry is not known.

== Literary work ==
Aizaz started his poetry work with gazals and nazms, although love, social and other poetic expressions were his mains themes. His prominent poetry include Dhiyan Ki Seerian and Dhoop Ka Rang Gulabi Ho. Aizaz also made his contribution to children's poetry and authored two poems titled Titli (butterfly) and Phool aur Chand (flower and moon), which were later broadcast by Radio Pakistan.

He also wrote a book titled Roshini Misaal which comprises Sufi devotional as well as religious poems, including hamd, naats, manqabat and kafis.

== Death ==
On 15 August 2015, he suffered from a chest pain and died in Lahore, Pakistan. He is buried in Karim Block cemetery of Allama Iqbal Town.
