= Mazhar Tirmazi =

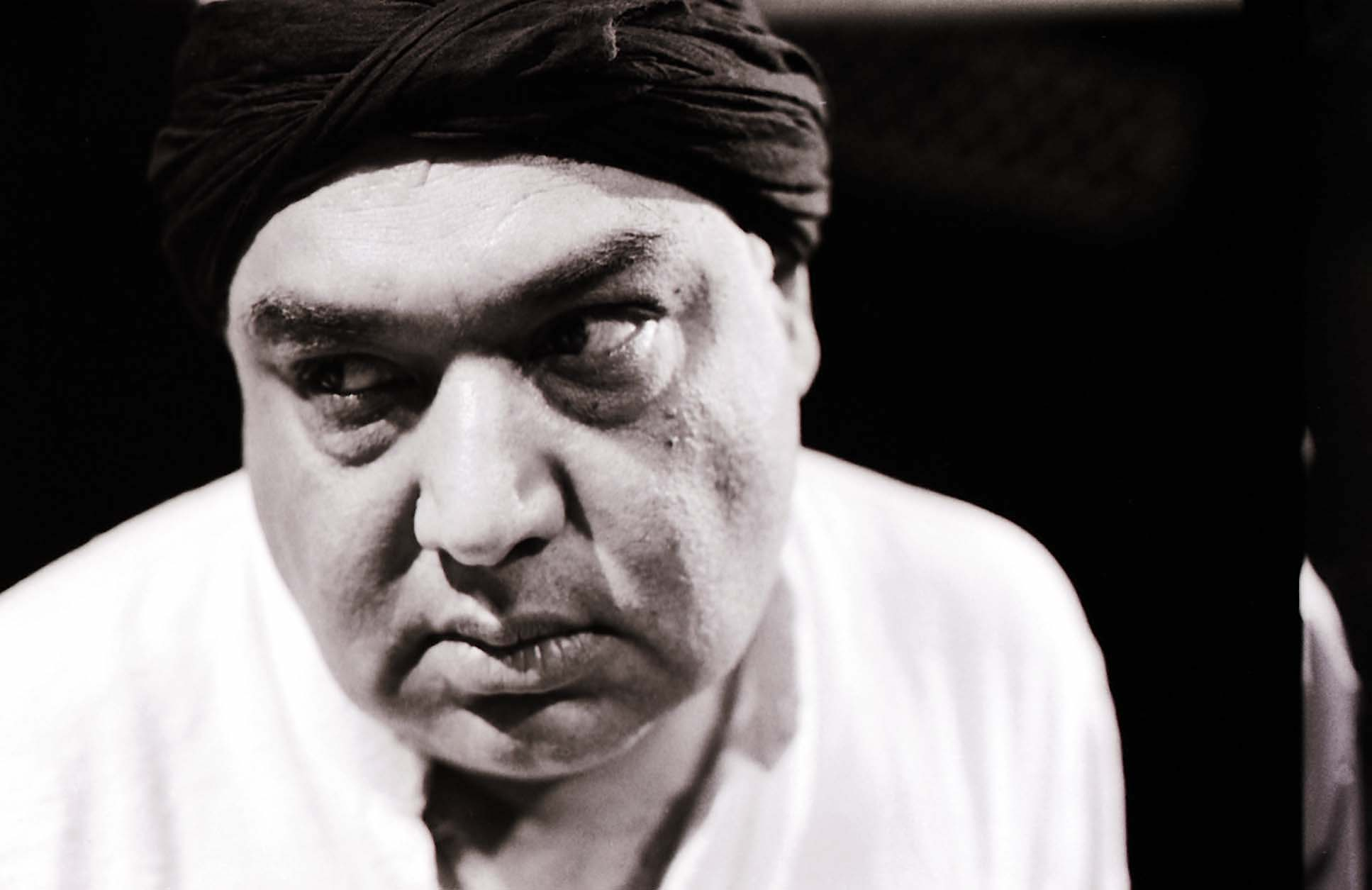
Tirmazi in London, 1999

Mazhar Tirmazi (Note: Punjabi: مظہر ترمزی) (born September 26, 1950) is a London-based Punjabi poet and journalist. His poem, UmraN LangiaN PabaN Bhaar (A Lifetime on Tiptoes — Healing the Wounds of Partition), was adapted for a Ghazal rendition by Asad Amanat Ali Khan and is widely acclaimed.

== Works ==
Poetry

- Jãgda Sufna (Dream of Awakening; 1983)
- Thandi Bhubal (Cold Ashes; 1986)
- Kãya Kãgad (The Body is Paper; 1998)
- Dooja Hath Sawãli (My Other Pleading Hand; 2001)

Theatre

- UmraN LangiaN PabaN Bhaar (A Lifetime on Tiptoes — Healing the Wounds of Partition), nominated for Amnesty International's Freedom of Expression Award at the 2007 Edinburgh Festival.
