= Qadir Yar =

- Born: Qadir Baksh; 1802; Machhike, Punjab, Sikh Empire (now in Punjab, Pakistan)
- Died: 1892 (aged 89–90)
- Occupation: Poet

Qadir Yar (Note: Punjabi: قادر یار) (1802–1892), born Qadar Baksh, was a Muslim Sandhu Jat and a poet of the Punjabi language. He wrote Punjabi Qissa like Qissa Purana Bhagat, Raja Rasal.

== Life ==
Qadir Yar was born in the village of Machhike, in Gujranwala District during the rule of the Sikh Empire. He belonged to an agriculturalist family and was Sandhu by caste. The details of his life are not available except that he received his education at the village mosque.

He was the court poet of the Lahore Darbar, during the reign of Maharaja Ranjit Singh.

== Works ==
Digitization of Qissa Puran Bhagat by Qadir Yar

Qadir Yar started his literary career with Mehraj Nama (1832), the longest poem composed by him and containing 1014 couplets. The poem gives a fictional account of Prophet Muhammad's journey through the seven skies. It tells the story of Puran Bhagat. His other significant works include Qissa Sohni Mahinwal, Hari Singh Nalwa Di Var, and Var Rani Kokilan.

== See also ==
- Punjabi
- Punjabi literature
- Muslim Jats
