= History of Lahore =

The recorded history of Lahore (Punjabi: لہور دی تریخ (Shahmukhi); romanized: Làhaur dī tàrīk͟h) refers to the past history of the city of Lahore, the post-medieval cultural and political hub of the Punjab region. Today, the city is the capital of the Pakistani province of Punjab and is primarily inhabited by the native ethnic Punjabis. Throughout its recorded history, it has changed hands from many foreign to native states and empires such as the Indo-Greeks, Kushans, Guptas, Alchon Huns, Takkas, Hindu Shahis, Ghaznavids, Delhi Sultanate, Surs, Mughals, Durranis, Misls, Sikh Empire and the British, thereby becoming the cultural capital and the heart of modern-day Pakistan.

== Ancient era ==
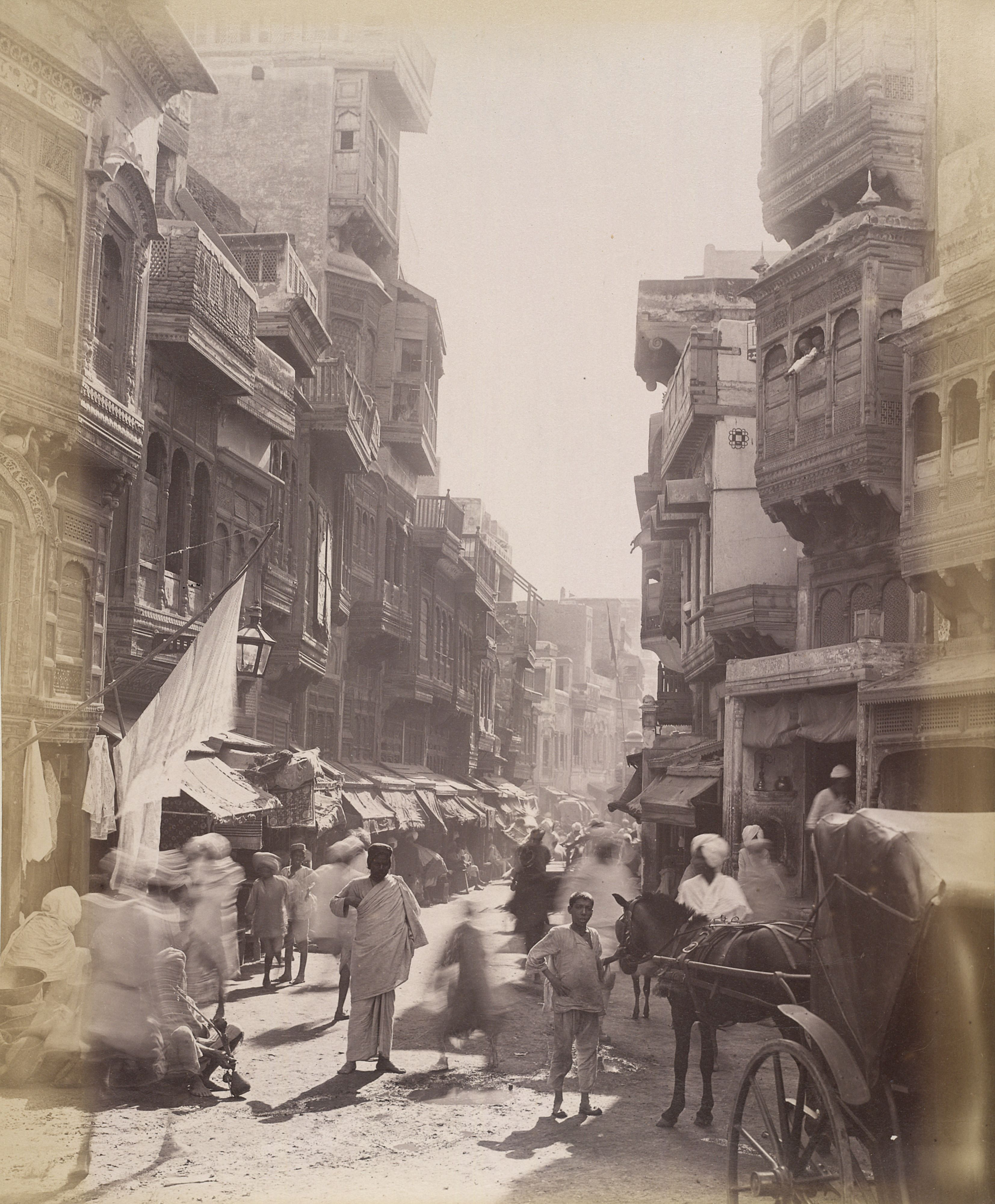
An old street-scene in Lahore.

According to oral traditions, Lahore was named after Lava, son of the Hindu god Rama, who supposedly founded the city. Lahore Fort has a vacant temple dedicated in honour of Lava. Likewise, the Ravi River that flows through northern Lahore was said to be named in honour of the Hindu goddess Durga.

Ptolemy, the celebrated astronomer and geographer, mentions in his Geographia a city called Labokla situated on the route between the Indus river in a region described as extending along the rivers Bidastes or Vitasta (Jhelum), Sandabal or Chandra Bhaga (Chenab), and Adris or Iravati (Ravi).

The oldest authentic document about Lahore was written anonymously in 982 and is called Hudud-i-Alam. It was translated into English by Vladimir Fedorovich Minorsky and published in Lahore in 1927. In this document, Lahore is referred to as a small shahr (city) with "impressive temples, large markets and huge orchards." It refers to "two major markets around which dwellings exist," and it also mentions "the mud walls that enclose these two dwellings to make it one." The original document is currently held in the British Museum.

=== Jain Heritage ===
Plutarch as well as many other scholars suggest that Jainism was the most ancient and original religion in Punjab. Lahore was the cultural centre of Jainism. A book written by Plutarch, Life of Alexander talks about the encounters between Alexander the Great and Śvetāmbara Jaina saints. Bhabra or Bhabhra is an ancient merchant community from Punjab region which mainly follows Jainism. It is believed to be connected with the Bhavadar or Bhavada Gachchha to which the Śvetāmbara Jaina Acharya Kalakacharya belonged to. They may have originated from the Bhabra town (32° 13' 30": 73° 13'). Inscriptions suggest that Bhavada Gachchha had survived until the 17th century. There were Jain temples at localities still called Thari Bhabrian and Gali Bhabrian.

=== Hindu heritage ===
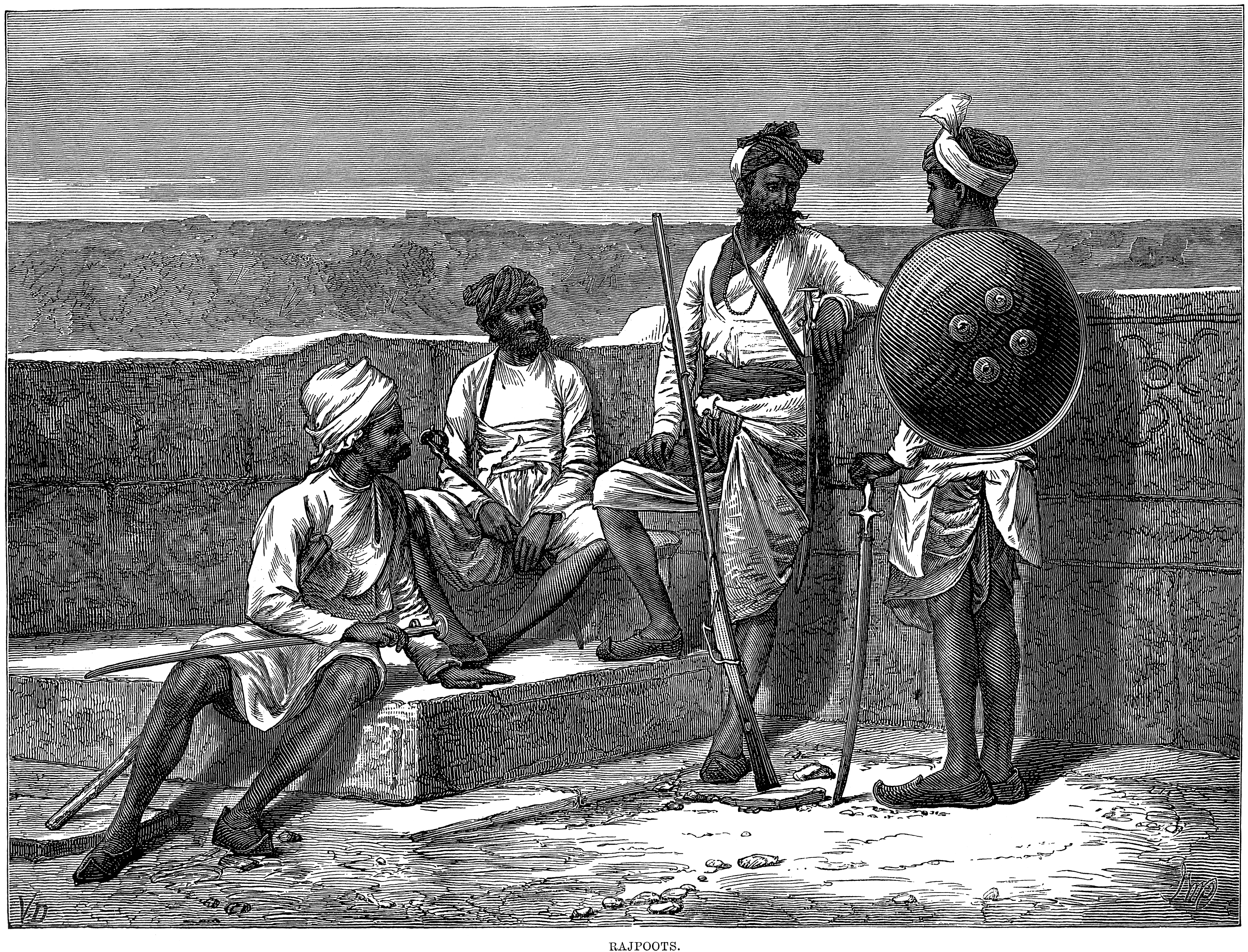
An 1876 engraving of Rajputs, from the Illustrated London News.

Around 580 BC., when King Bimbisara ruled South Asia, the society came to be divided into different communities based on their occupation. One of their communities was called Kshatriyas and King Luv's descendants were classed with them and came to be known as Luvanam, which was also referred to as Luvana. The Luvanas from Loharghat became known as Loharana (masters of swords; or iron ("Loha") chiefs ("Rana")), which later became Lohana.

Present view of the Ichhra Bazaar (Market) at night. The market, because of being designed in very old style is very narrow for vehicles to cross and shoppers to walk.

There are no architectural remains of the old Hindu city of Lahore, a circumstance which might well be explained by the absence of stone material, and the numerous destructive invasions to which the city has been subjected. But also, in accordance with what all Indian architectural researchers tend to show namely, that the northern Hindus were not, until a comparatively late period, in the habit of building temples, or durable edifices of any kind. Even at Delhi, the seat of Hindu dynasties from upwards of a thousand years before CE to more than a thousand years after CE, and there, where is abundance of stone, no specimens of Hindu architecture exist dating earlier than the tenth or eleventh century.

== Medieval era ==
In 682 AD, according to Ferishta, the Afghans of Peshawar, who had, even at that early period, embraced Islam, wrested certain possessions from the Hindu prince. A war ensued, and in the space seventy battles were fought with varied success, until the Afghans, having formed an alliance with the Ghakkars, a wild tribe inhabiting the Salt Range of Punjab, compelled the Raja to cede a portion of his territory. The next mention of Lahore is in the Rajputana chronicles, where the Bussas of Lahore, a Rajput tribe, are mentioned as rallying to the defence of Chittore, when besieged by Muslim forces in the beginning of the ninth century.

=== Ghaznavid Empire ===
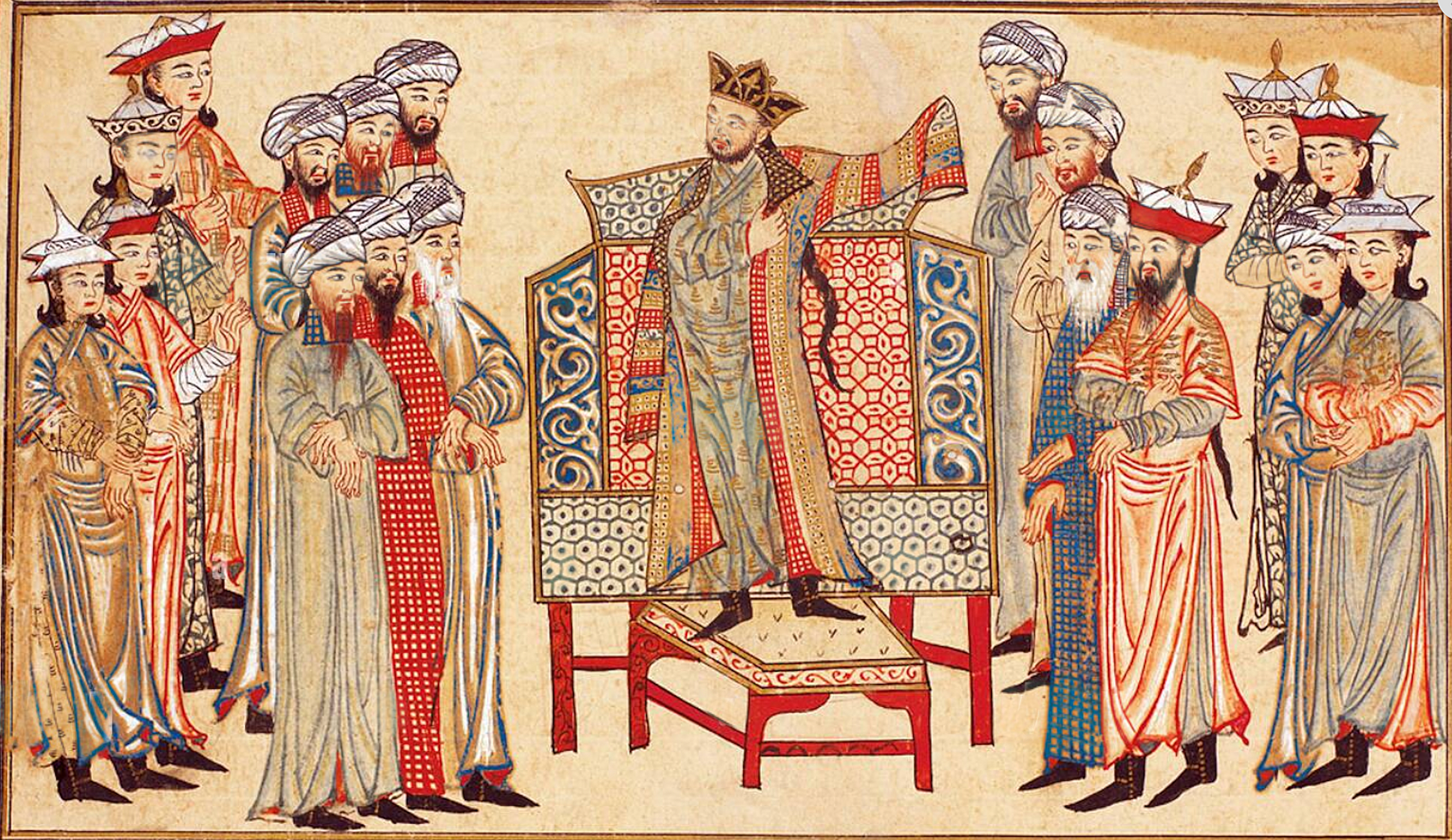
Mahmud of Ghazni (center) receives a robe from Caliph Al-Qadir; painting by Rashid-al-Din Hamadani.

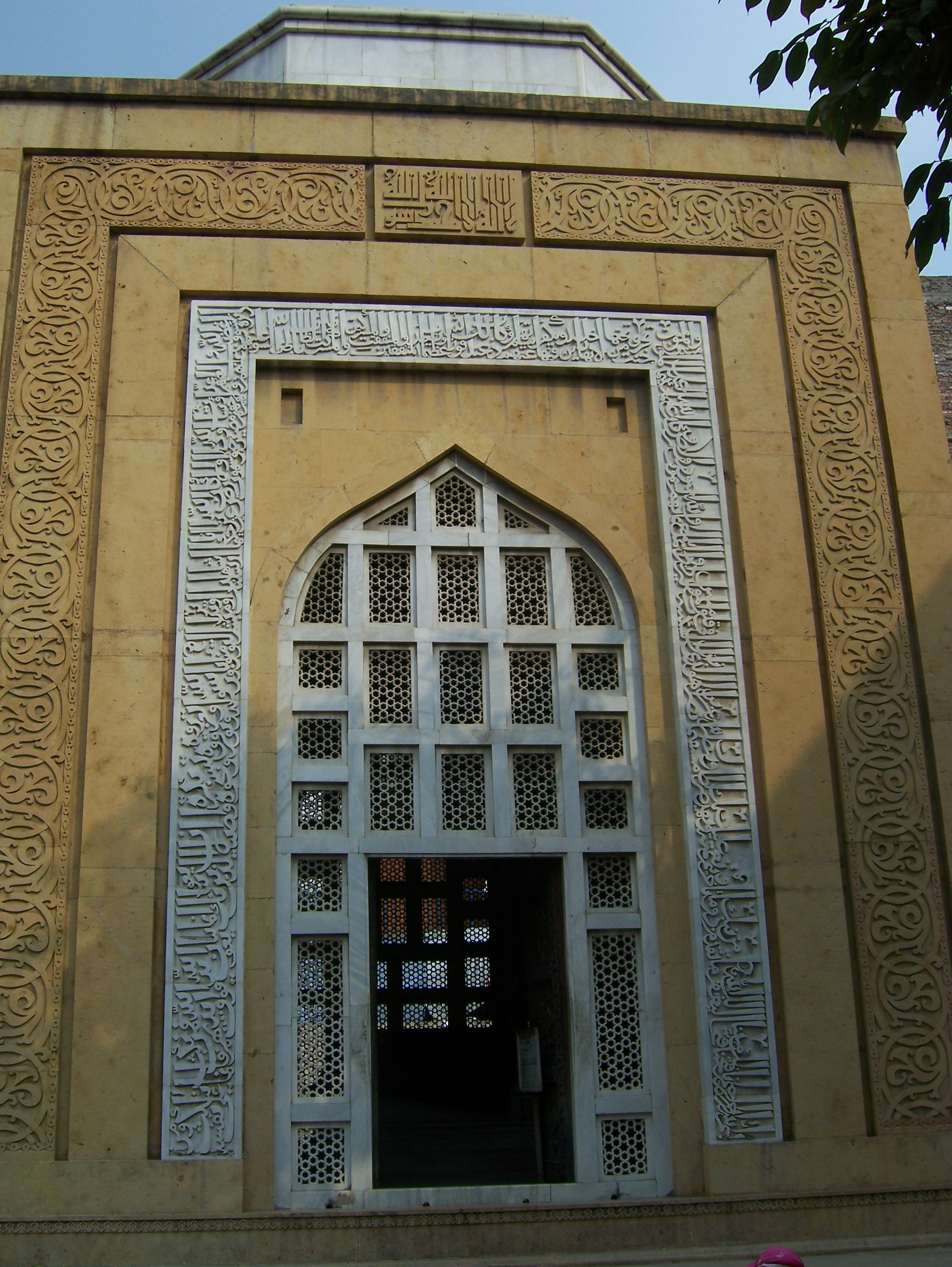
The mausoleum of Sultan Qutub ud Din Aibak in Anarkali, Lahore, Pakistan.

At length, in 975 AD, Sultan Sabuktigin, Governor of Khorassan and father of the celebrated Sultan Mahmud Ghaznavi advanced beyond the Indus. He was met by Raja Jayapala, the Raja of Lahore whose dominion is said to have extended from Sirhind to Laghman and from Kashmir to Multan. By the advice of the Bhati Rajput tribe, the Raja Jayapala formed an alliance with the Afghans, and, with their aid, was enabled to withstand the first invasion. However, Sabuktigin later repeated his conquest on his succession to the throne of Ghazni. A battle ensued in the vicinity of Lamghan ending with the defeat of the Raja and overtures being made for peace. His terms were accepted and persons were sent, on the part of Sabuktigin, to take the balance of the stipulated ransom. On reaching Lahore, Jayapala proved faithless and imprisoned those commissioned to receive the treasure. On learning intelligence of his perfidy, Sabuktigin, in the words of the Ferishta, "like a foaming torrent, hastened towards Hindustan".

Another battles ensued, in which Jaipal was again vanquished, and he retreated, leaving the territory to the west of the Nilab or Indus in the hands of the invader. The invader did not retain the conquests that he had made for in 1008 AD, a confederation headed by Anandapala, the son of Raja Jayapala, again met the advancing army, now commanded by Mahmud, son and successor of Sabaktagin, in the vicinity of Peshawar. Lahore was allowed to remain intact for thirteen years longer. Anandapala was succeeded by Nardjanpal, while Mahmud pushed his conquests into Hindustan. But in 1022 AD, he suddenly marched down from Kashmir, seized Lahore without opposition, and gave it over to be plundered. Nardjanpal fled helpless to Ajmer, and the Hindu principality of Lahore was extinguished forever. A final effort was made by the Hindus in the reign of Modud, 1045 AD, to recover their lost sovereignty, but after a fruitless siege of six months, they retired without success.

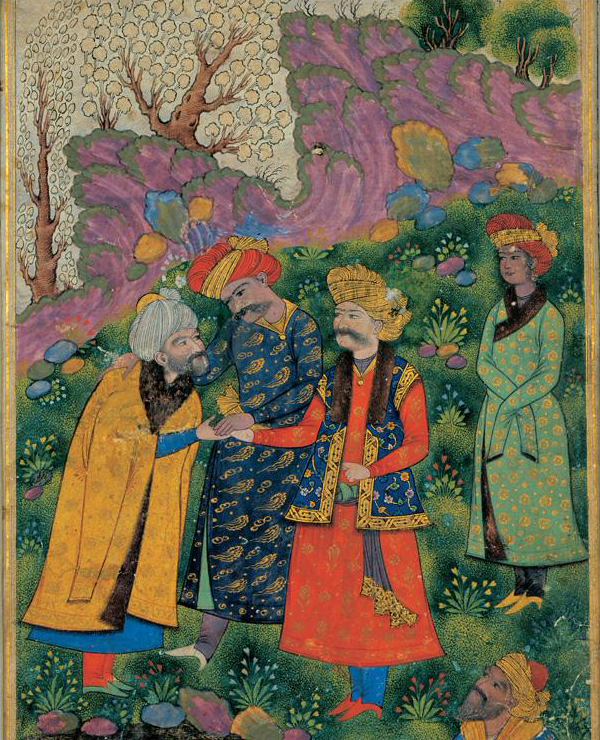
Mahmud and Ayaz Sultan Mahmud Ghaznavi is to the right, shaking the hand of the Shaikh, with Ayaz standing behind him. The figure to his right is Shah Abbas I, who reigned about 600 years later.

Few references to Lahore exist for times before its capture by Sultan Mahmud Ghaznavi in the eleventh century. In 1021, Mahmud appointed Malik Ayaz to the throne and made Lahore the capital of the Ghaznavid Empire.

The Sultan Mahmud Ghaznavi took Lahore after a long siege and battle in which the city was torched and depopulated. As the first Muslim ruler of Lahore, Ayaz rebuilt and repopulated the city. The present Lahore Fort stands in the same location. Under his rule, the city became a cultural and academic center, renowned for poetry. The tomb of Malik Ayaz can still be seen in the Rang Mahal commercial area of town.

Lahore was formally made the eastern capital of the Ghaznavid empire in 1152, under the reign of Khusrau Shah. The city then became the sole capital of the Ghaznavid empire in 1163 after the fall of Ghazni. The entire city of Lahore during the medieval Ghaznavid era was probably located west of the modern Shah Alami Bazaar, and north of the Bhatti Gate.

After the fall of the Ghaznavid Empire, Lahore was ruled by various Muslim dynasties known as the Delhi Sultanate, including the Khaljis, Tughlaqs, Sayyid, Lodhis and Suris. When Sultan Qutb-ud-din Aybak was crowned here in 1206, he became the first Muslim Sultan of South Asia. It was not until 1524 that Lahore became part of the Mughal Empire.

=== Mamluk ===
In 1187, the Ghurids invaded Lahore, ending Ghaznavid rule over Lahore. Lahore was made capital of the Mamluk Dynasty of the Delhi Sultanate following the assassination of Muhammad of Ghor in 1206. Under the reign of Mamluk sultan Qutbu l-Din Aibak, Lahore attracted poets and scholars from as far away as Turkestan, Greater Khorasan, Persia, and Mesopotamia. Lahore at this time had more poets writing in Persian than any city in Persia or Khorasan.

Following the death of Aibak, Lahore came to be disputed among Ghurid officers. The city first came under control of the Governor of Multan, Nasir ad-Din Qabacha, before being briefly captured by the sultan of the Mamluks in Delhi, Iltutmish, in 1217.

In an alliance with local Khokhars in 1223, Jalal al-Din Mangburni of the Khwarazmian dynasty of modern-day Uzbekistan captured Lahore after fleeing Genghis Khan's invasion of Khwarazm. Jalal al-Din's then fled from Lahore to capture the city of Uch Sharif after Iltutmish's armies re-captured Lahore in 1228.

The threat of Mongol invasions and political instability in Lahore caused future Sultans to regard Delhi as a safer capital for medieval Islamic India, though Delhi had before been considered a forward base, while Lahore had been widely considered to be the centre of Islamic culture in the subcontinent.

Lahore came under progressively weaker central rule under Iltutmish's descendants in Delhi - to the point that governors in the city acted with great autonomy. Under the rule of Kabir Khan Ayaz, Lahore was virtually independent from the Delhi Sultanate. Lahore was sacked and ruined by the Mongol army in 1241. Lahore governor Malik Ikhtyaruddin Qaraqash fled the Mongols, while the Mongols held the city for a few years under the rule of the Mongol chief Toghrul.

In 1266, Sultan Balban reconquered Lahore, but in 1287 under the Mongol ruler Temür Khan, the Mongols again overran northern Punjab. Because of Mongol invasions, Lahore region had become a city on a frontier, with the region's administrative centre shifted south to Dipalpur. The Mongols again invaded northern Punjab in 1298, though their advance was eventually stopped by Ulugh Khan, brother of Sultan Alauddin Khalji of Delhi. The Mongols again attacked Lahore in 1305.

City Name	Year	Dynasty/Empire
Lahawar	≈ 2nd cent. BC	Mauryan Empire
Lahawar	Indo-Scythians	150 BC
Lahawar	Indo-Parthian Kingdom	19 CE
Lahawar	Kushan Empire	1st Century
Lahawar	Kidarites	4th Century
Lahawar	Gupta Empire	5th–6th Century
Lahawar	Taank Kingdom	7th Century

=== Mongol invasion and destruction ===
The Mongols invaded and conquered the Khwarazmian dynasty, the King Jalal al-Din Mangburni retreated to modern Khyber Pakhtunkhwa but was defeated in Battle of Indus.

The Mongol army advanced and in 1241, the ancient city of Lahore was invaded by 30,000-man cavalry. The Mongols defeated the Lahore governor Malik Ikhtyaruddin Qaraqash, massacred the entire population and the city was leveled to the ground. There are no buildings or monuments in Lahore that predates the Mongol destruction. In 1266, Sultan Balban reconquered Lahore from the Mongols but in 1296 to 1305 the Mongols again overran northern Punjab. In 1298, 200,000 men Mongol army conquered Punjab and committed atrocities then marched towards Delhi but was defeated by Malik Kafur general of Sultan Alauddin Khalji ruler of the Delhi Sultanate.

=== Tughluq ===
Lahore briefly flourished again under the reign of Ghazi Malik of the Tughluq dynasty between 1320 and 1325, though the city was again sacked in 1329, by Tarmashirin of the Central Asian Chagatai Khanate, and then again by the Mongol chief Hülechü. Khokhars seized Lahore in 1342, but the city was retaken by Ghazi Malik's son, Muhammad bin Tughluq. The weakened city then fell into obscurity, and was captured once more by the Khokhars in 1394. By the time Tamerlane captured the city in 1398 from Shayka Khokhar, he did not loot it because it was no longer wealthy.

=== Fall of the Sultanate ===
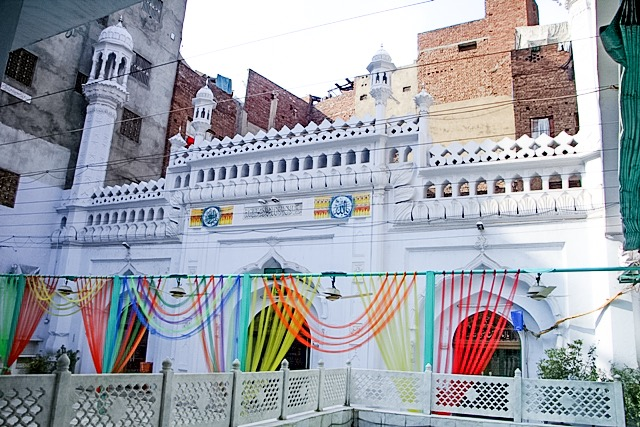
The Neevin Mosque is one of Lahore's few remaining medieval era buildings.

Timur gave control of the Lahore region to Khizr Khan, Governor of Multan, who later established the Sayyid dynasty in 1414 – the fourth dynasty of the Delhi Sultanate. Lahore was briefly occupied by the Timurid Governor of Kabul in 1432–33. Lahore began to be incurred upon yet again the Khokhar tribe, and so the city was granted to Bahlul Lodi in 1441 by the Sayyid dynasty in Delhi, though Lodi would then displace the Sayyids in 1451 by establishing himself upon the throne of Delhi.

Bahlul Lodi installed his cousin, Tatar Khan, to be governor of the city, though Tatar Khan died in battle with Sikandar Lodi in 1485. Governorship of Lahore was transferred by Sikandar Lodi to Umar Khan Sarwani, who quickly left management of this city to his son Said Khan Sarwani. Said Khan was removed from power in 1500 by Sikandar Lodi, and Lahore came under the governorship of Daulat Khan Lodi, son of Tatar Khan and former employer of Guru Nanak – founder of the Sikh faith. The last Lodi ruler, Sultan Ibrahim Lodi was greatly disliked by his court and subjects. Upon the death of his father Sultan Sikandar Lodi, he quashed a brief rebellion led by some of his nobles who wanted his younger brother Jalal Khan to be the Sultan. After seizing the throne by having Jalal Khan murdered, he never really did succeed in pacifying his nobles. Subsequently, Daulat Khan, the governor of Punjab and Alam Khan, his uncle, sent an invitation to Babur, the ruler of Kabul to invade Delhi.

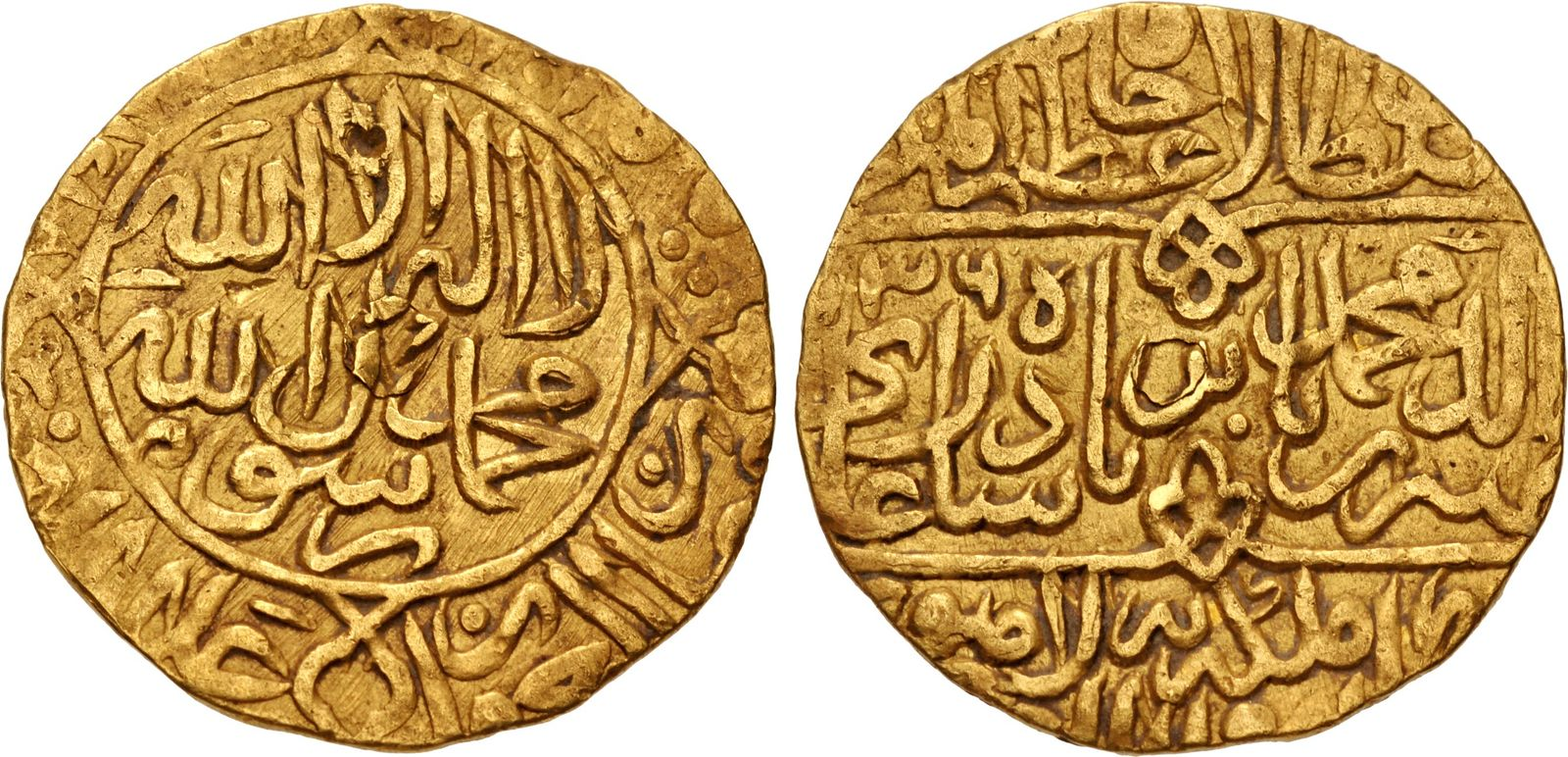
Mughal Empire. Zahir al-Din Muhammad Babur. AH 932-937, AD 1526-1530. AV Mithqal – Tilla (22.5mm, 4.71 g, 1h). Lahore mint. Dated AH (9)36 (1529–30)

The first Battle of Panipat (April 1526) was fought between the forces of Babur and the Delhi Sultanate. Ibrahim Lodi was killed on the battlefield. By way of superior generalship, vast experience in warfare, effective strategy, and appropriate use of artillery, Babur won the First battle of Panipat and subsequently occupied Agra and Delhi.

== Early Modern era ==
=== Mughal Empire ===
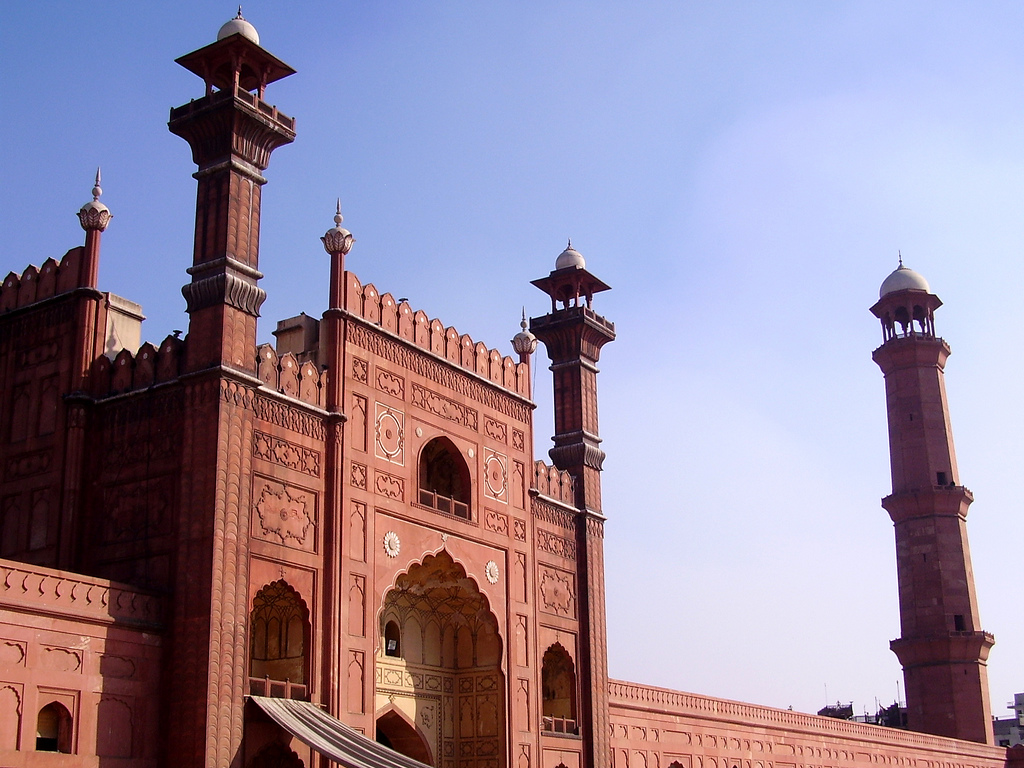
Entrance of the Badshahi Mosque or Emperor's Mosque built by the Mughal Emperor Aurangzeb.

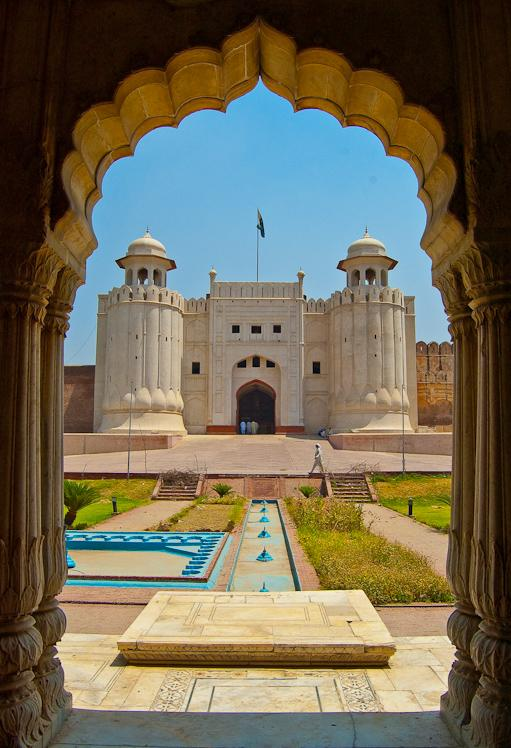
The Alamgiri Gate is the main entrance to the Lahore Fort built during the reign of Aurangzeb.

Lahore reached a peak of architectural glory during the rule of the Mughals, whose buildings and gardens survived the hazards of time. Lahore's reputation for beauty fascinated the English poet John Milton, who wrote "Agra and Lahore, the Seat of Great Mughal" in 1670.

From 1524 to 1752, Lahore was part of the Mughal Empire. Lahore grew under emperor Babur; from 1584 to 1598, under the emperors Akbar the Great and Jahangir, the city served as the empire's capital. Lahore reached the peak of its architectural glory during the rule of the Mughals, many of whose buildings and gardens have survived the ravages of time. Lahore's reputation for beauty fascinated the English poet John Milton, who wrote "Agra and Lahore, the Seat of the Great Mughal" in 1670. During this time, the massive Lahore Fort was built. A few buildings within the fort were added by Akbar's son, Mughal Emperor Jahangir, who is buried in the city. Jahangir's son, Shahjahan Burki, was born in Lahore. He, like his father, extended the Lahore Fort and built many other structures in the city, including the Shalimar Gardens. The last of the great Mughals, Aurangzeb, who ruled from 1658 to 1707, built the city's most famous monuments, the Badshahi Masjid and the Alamgiri Gate next to the Lahore Fort.

The 17th century saw the Lahore Quartet of Abu al-Barakat Munir Lahori, Muhammad Saleh Kamboh, Shaikh Inayat Allah Kamboh, and Chandar Bhan Brahman, four local scholars and poets of Lahore's literary culture who mutually promoted each other and engaged in the revival of Persian literacy in India.

During the 18th century, as Mughal power dwindled, Lahore was often invaded, and government authority was lacking. The great Punjabi poet Baba Waris Shah said of the situation, "khada peeta wahy da, baqi Ahmad Shahy da" — "we have nothing with us except what we eat and wear, all other things are for Ahmad Shah". Ahmad Shah Durrani captured remnants of the Mughal Empire and had consolidated control over the Punjab and Kashmir regions by 1761.

The Delhi Sultanate and later Mughal Empire ruled the region. The Lahore region became predominantly Muslim. Due to missionary Sufi saints whose dargahs dot the landscape of Punjab region, and to the efforts of Mughal emperors, whose policies and forced religious conversions discouraged the growth of other religions.

The 1740s were years of chaos, and the city had nine different governors between 1745 and 1756.

=== Maratha Empire ===
Shortly after defeating the Afghans in the Battle of Delhi, the Marathas entered Lahore in 1758.

In March 1758, about 50,000 Maratha soldiers sieged Sirhind. They formed an unusual alliance with the Sikh Misls and the Mughal Governor Adina Beg Khan. Lahore was governed by, Taimur Shah, son of Ahmed Shah, and subordinated by Jahan Khan, at the head of about 25,000 strong army. In April 1758, the Marathas massacred the Afghan garrison and victoriously entered Lahore.

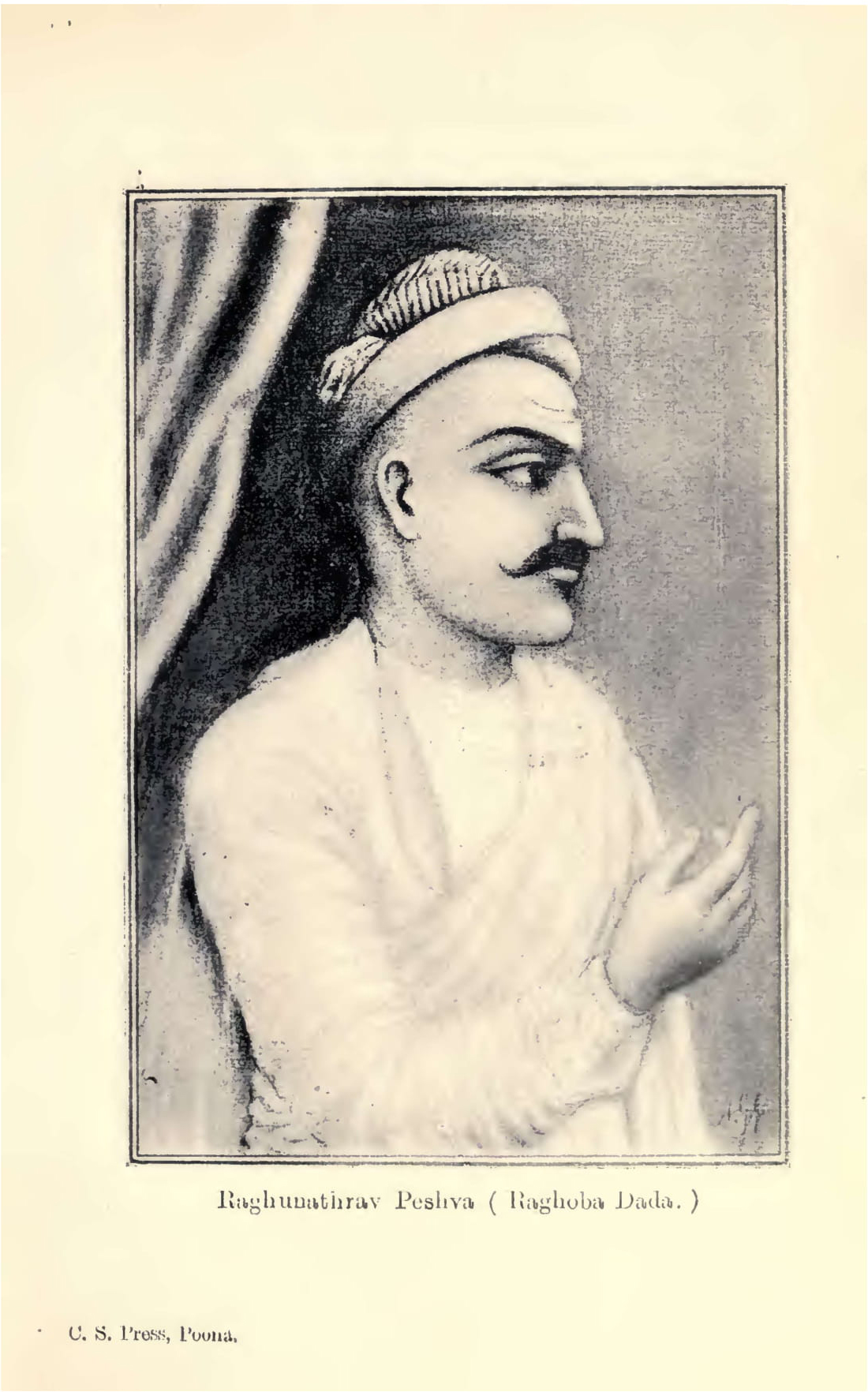
Raghunathrao, the Maratha leader who conquered Lahore in 1758.

In 1759, the Marathas and their allied forces crushed an invasion by the Durrani general Jahan Khan at the Battle of Lahore. The Marathas achieved a string of astonishing successes with their conquests of Delhi, Lahore, Kashmir, Multan, Peshawar and Attock. They appointed Adina Beg Khan as the new governor of Lahore.

=== Sikh period ===
==== Sikhs Misls ====
After defeating the Durranis In battle of Gujranwala (1761) and battle of Sialkot, in 1761, the Sikhs attacked Lahore and besieged it. The Khawaja was forced to surrender and the Sikhs entered the city and plundered the city, capturing the royal mint and strucking coins bearing "Sikka Zad dar Jahan Bafazat-i-Akal, mulk-i-Ahmad garift Jassa Kalal", which means 'the coin struck by Grace of God in the country of Ahmad captured by Jassa Kalal.'

On 1765, Bhangi Misl leader Gujjar Singh Dhillon along with Lehna Singh and Sobha Singh Kanhaiya forced their way to Lahore, They recaptured Lahore, dividing the city into three parts with Lehna Singh getting the most important part of capital, who proved to be an able administrator

==== Sikh Empire ====
During the 18th century, as Mughal power dwindled, Lahore was often invaded by Afghan armies and became a province of the Afghan Empire, governed by provincial rulers with their own court. mainly in the Punjab region.

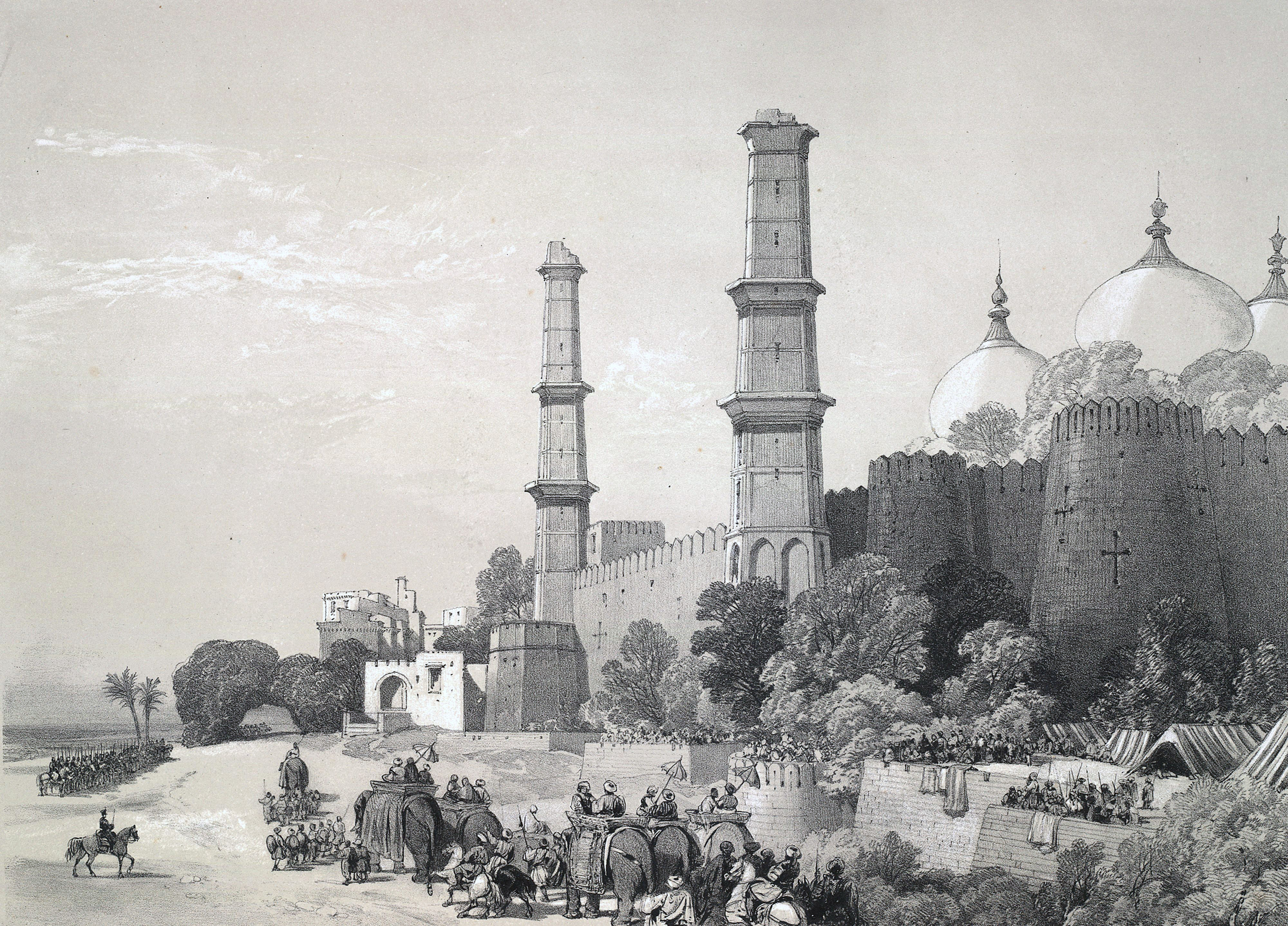
Badshahi Mosque with damaged minarets during Sikh rule

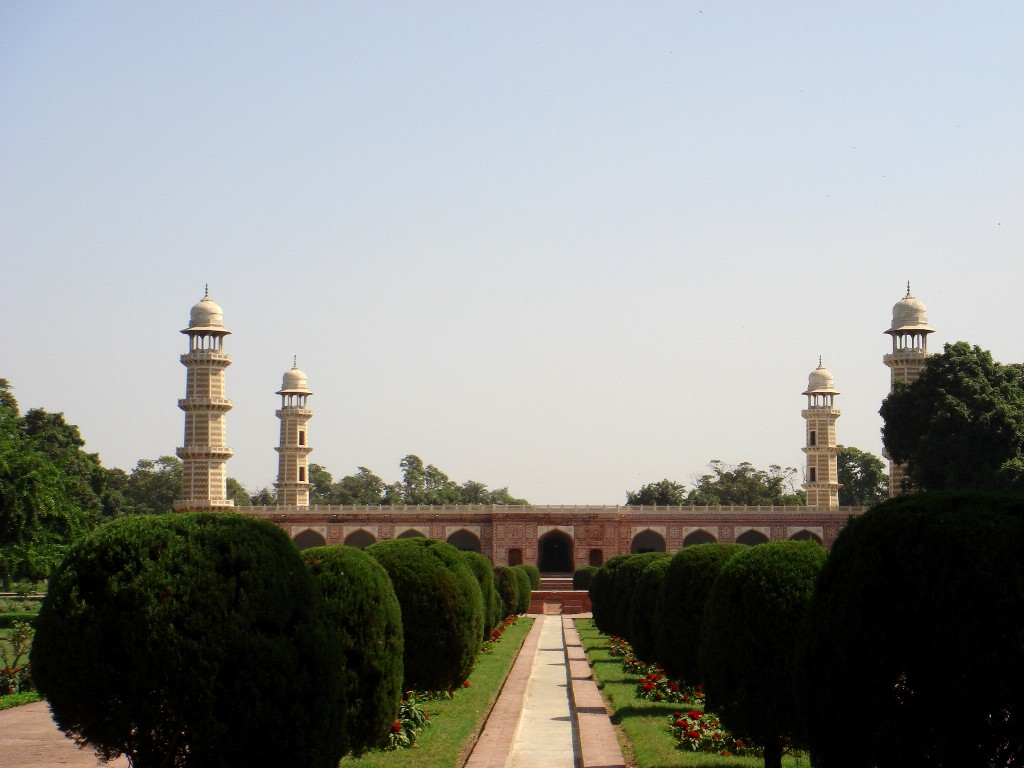
Mughal Emperor Jehangir's mausoleum in Shahdara, Lahore

On 7 July 1799, Ranjit Singh accompanied by his mother-in-law Sada Kaur captured Lahore. Ranjit Singh used the Hazuri Bagh, the enclosed garden next to the Mosque as his official royal court of audience.

Twelve Sikh misls joined into one to form a new empire and sovereign Sikh State ruled by Maharaja Ranjit Singh. Ranjit Singh was crowned on 12 April 1801 at Lahore. The 1740s were years of chaos, and the city had nine different governors between 1745 and 1756. During this period Sikhs and Afghans fought battle against each other which is known as Afghan-Sikh wars, Sikhs able to capture whole Panjab region including Jammu, In 1801, Maharaja Ranjit Singh Established Sikh Empire. He defeated the grandson of Abdali, Zaman Shah in a battle between Lahore and Amritsar. Out of the chaos of Afghan and Sikh conflicts Ranjit Singh who was able to unify the Sikh factions and capture Lahore where he was crowned Emperor.

Syed Ahmad Barelvi in Balakot, Mansehra District on 6 May 1831. Barelvi declared jihad against the Sikhs and established a camp in Balakot. Along with Shah Ismail Dehlvi and his tribesmen, he attacked the Sikhs at dawn. The battle lasted all day. The Sikh soldiers eventually beheaded Syed Ahmad Barelvi, and hundreds of his followers were killed causing the Muslim army to flee the battlefield.

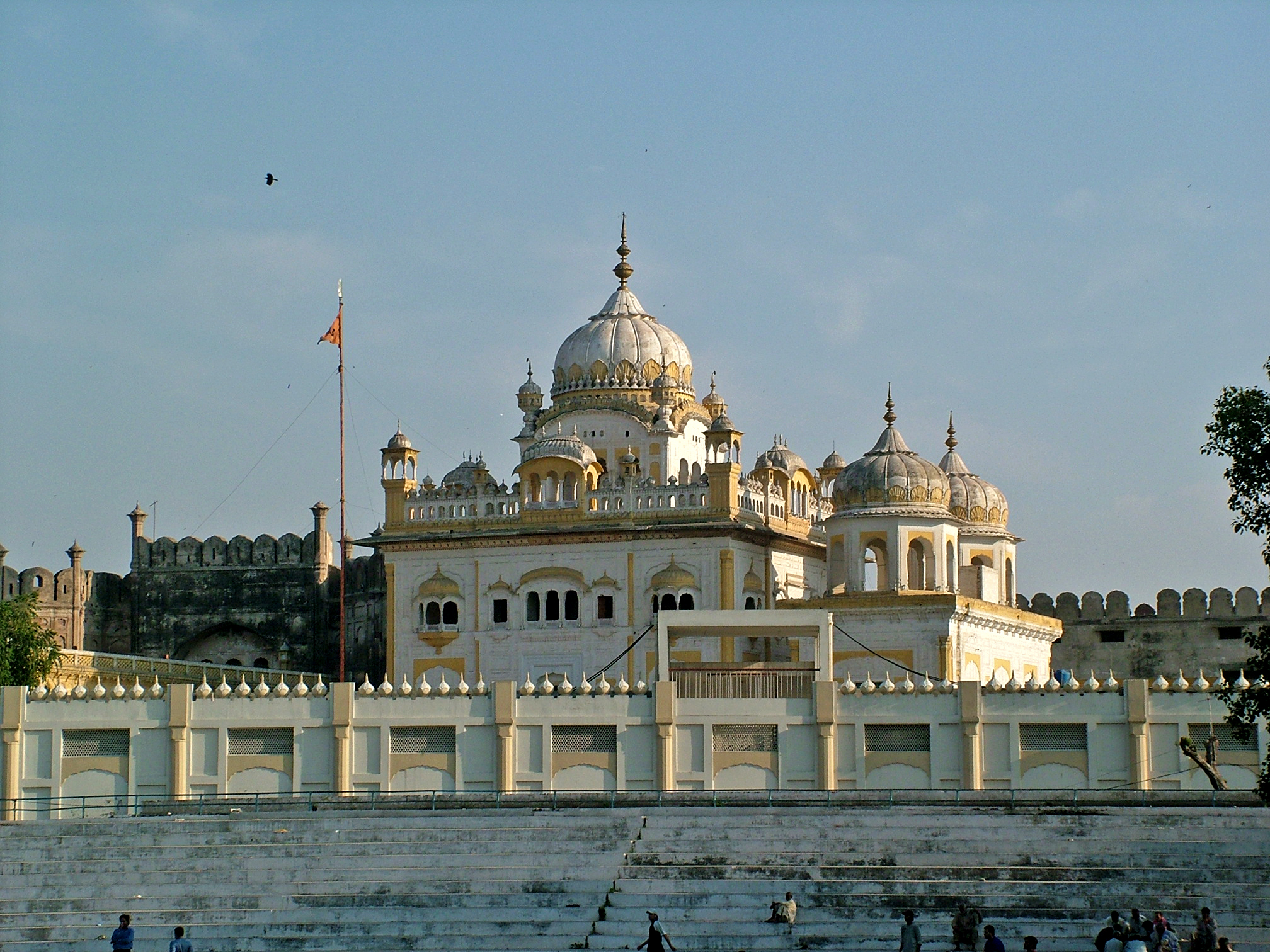
The Samadhi of Emperor Ranjit Singh in Lahore, Pakistan.

Ranjit Singh's died on 27 June 1839 ultimately ended his reign, while the Sikh rule continued until the British gained control of the empire in 1849.

In 1841, during the Sikh civil war, Ranjit Singh's son, Sher Singh, used the Badshahi Mosque's large minarets for placement of zamburahs or light guns, which were placed atop the minarets of Badshahi Mosque to bombard the supporters of the Sikh Maharani Chand Kaur taking refuge in the besieged Lahore Fort, inflicting great damage to the Fort itself. In one of these bombardments, the Fort's Diwan-e-Aam (Hall of Public Audience) was destroyed (it was subsequently rebuilt by the British but never regained its original architectural splendour). During this time, Henri De la Rouche, a French cavalry officer employed in the army of Sher Singh, used a tunnel connecting the Badshahi Mosque to the Lahore Fort to temporarily store gunpowder.

== Modern era ==
=== British Raj ===
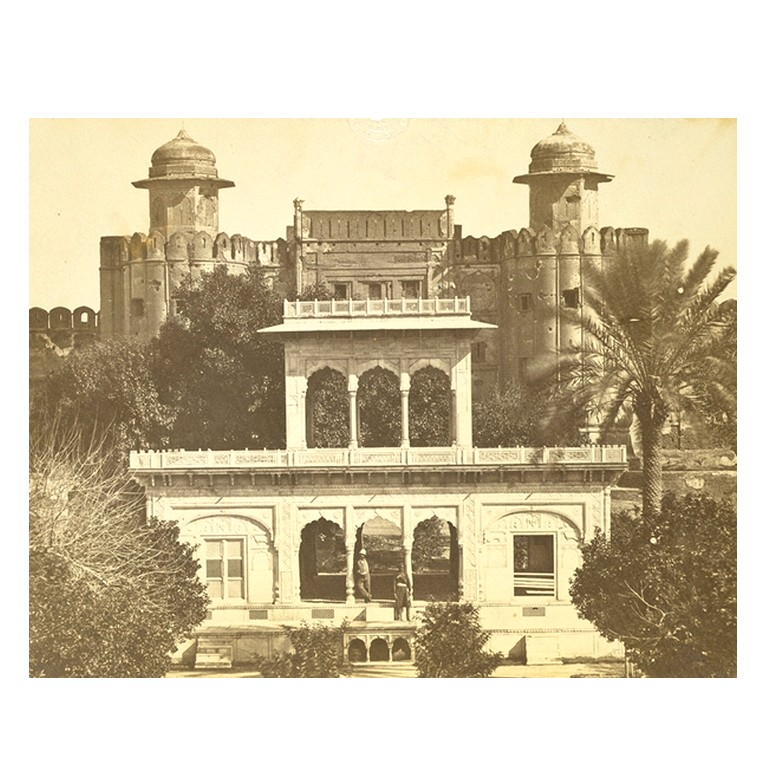
Hazuri Bagh Baradari and Lahore Fort, c. 1860s

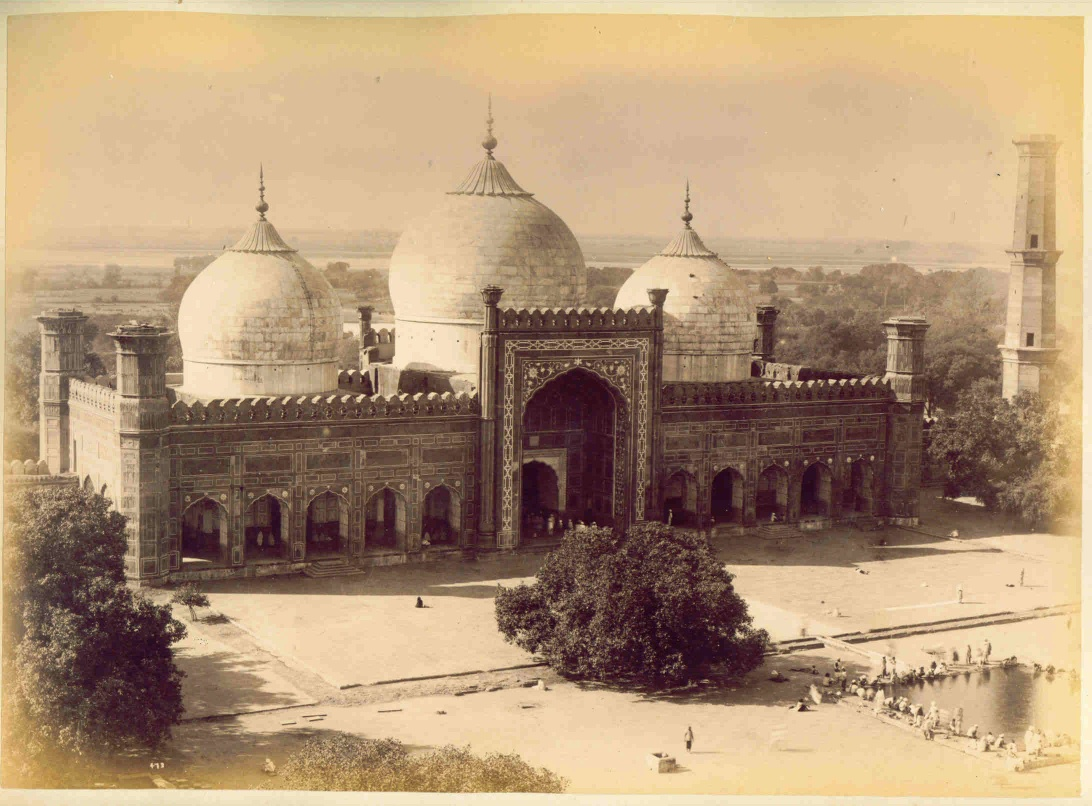
Badshahi Mosque, c. 1880s

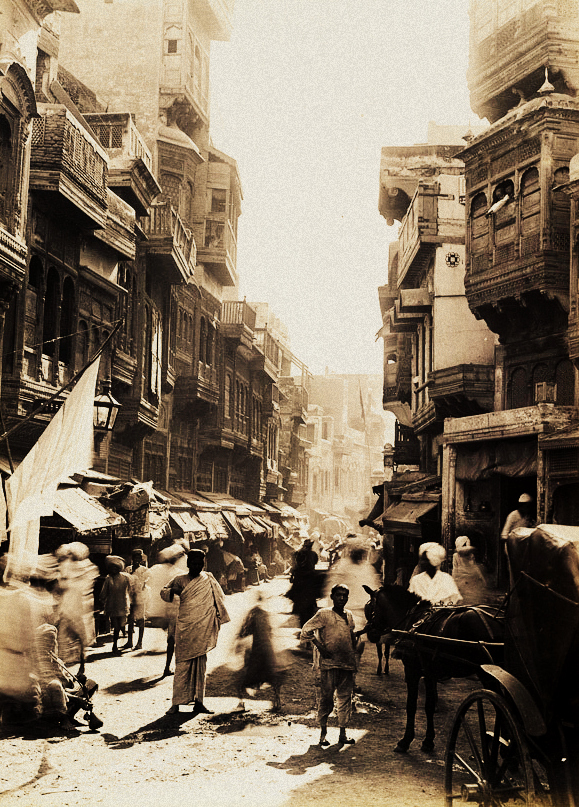
Street scene of Lahore, c. 1890

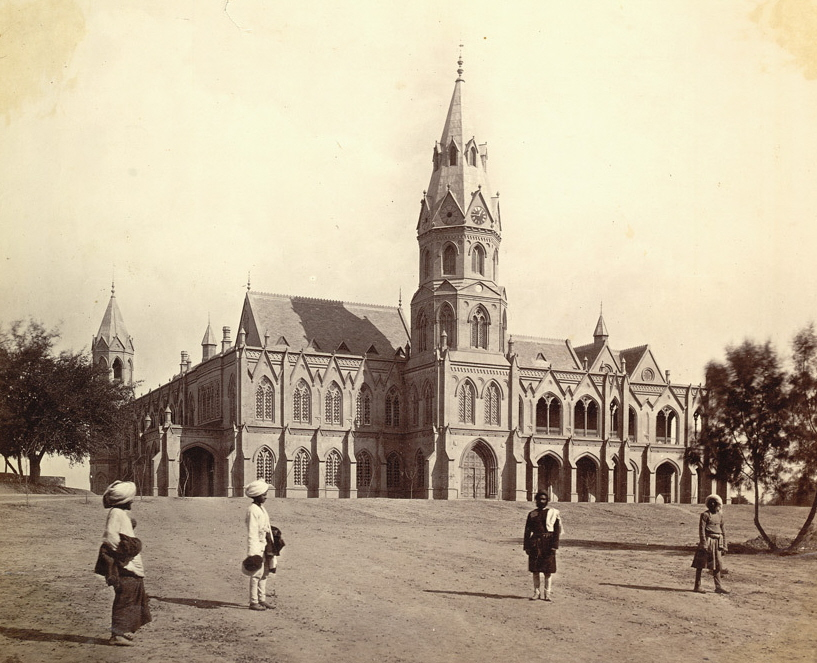
Government College, c. 1880s

Historic images of Lahore

Maharajah Ranjit Singh made Lahore his capital and was able to expand the kingdom to the Khyber Pass and also included Jammu and Kashmir, while keeping the British from expanding across the River Sutlej for more than 40 years. Instability following his death in 1839 contributed to a series of adverse events that led eventually to British control of the Lahore Darbar ten years later. These precipitating factors were the internecine fighting between the Sikhs; several rapid forfeitures of territory by his sons; the intrigues of the Dogras; and two Anglo-Sikh wars, the first in 1845–1846 and the second, of 1848-1849. Capitalising on the disarray surrounding the succession struggles after Ranjit Singh's death and only partially diminished by a war fought against the Sikhs on their eastern frontier, the British rode into Lahore in February 1846 and garrisoned their troops in the citadel. Two unstable years later, they were drawn into a second war with the Sikhs at the southern city of Multan when that city's governor, Mul Raj, encouraged his troops to rebel. After a series of closely fought battles, the Sikh army was finally defeated in the Battle of Gujrat, sixty miles north of Lahore. In March 1848, following the British victory, Dalip Singh, Ranjit Singh's teenage son and heir to the throne, was formally deposed in Lahore. The remaining Sikh regiments in the city were abruptly decommissioned and camped outside the city demanding severance pay. Within a year, the Punjab was formally annexed to the British Empire and military sappers had begun leveling Lahore's city wall.

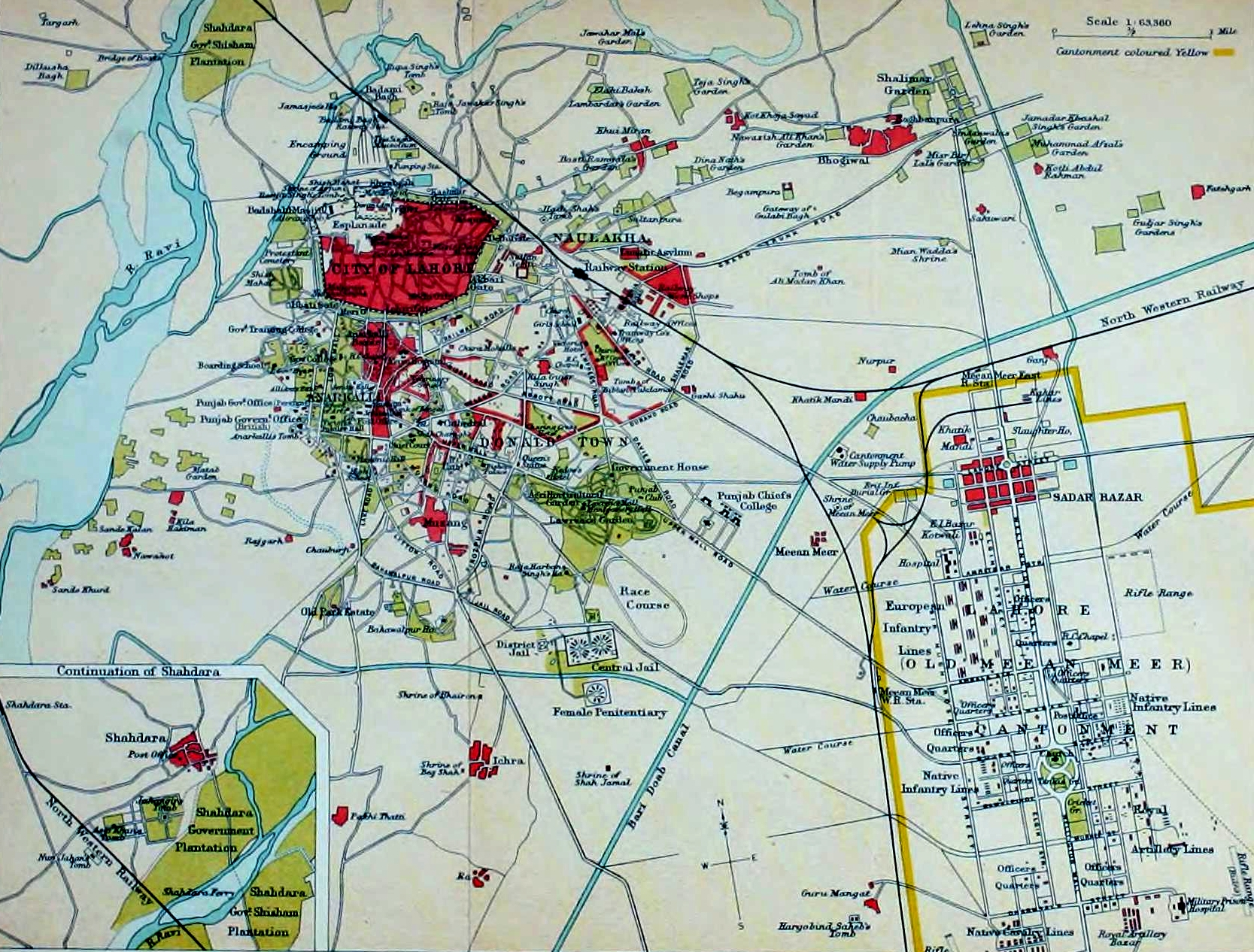
Map of Lahore and Environ in 1911

Under British rule (1849–1947), colonial architecture in Lahore combined Mughal, Gothic and Victorian styles. The General Post Office (GPO) and YMCA buildings in Lahore commemorated the golden jubilee of Queen Victoria, an event marked by the construction of clock towers and monuments all over India. Other important British buildings included the High Court, the Government College University, the museums, the National College of Arts, Montgomery Hall, Tollinton Market, the University of the Punjab (Old Campus) and the Provincial Assembly. Under British rule, Sir Ganga Ram (sometimes referred to as the father of modern Lahore) designed and built the General Post Office, Lahore Museum, Aitchison College, Mayo School of Arts (now the NCA), Ganga Ram Hospital, Lady Mclagan Girls High School, the chemistry department of the Government College University, the Albert Victor wing of Mayo Hospital, Sir Ganga Ram High School (now Lahore College for Women) the Hailey College of Commerce, Ravi Road House for the Disabled, the Ganga Ram Trust Building on Shahrah-e-Quaid-e-Azam, and the Lady Maynard Industrial School. He also constructed Model Town, a suburb that has recently developed into a cultural center for Lahore's growing socioeconomic elite.

The city has built a new campus in quieter environments on the Nahr, but the old university buildings are still functioning. For the sake of entertainment, the British introduced horse-racing to Lahore. The first racing club, established in 1924, is called LRC or Lahore Race Club.

=== Role in Independence ===
Viceroy Lord Mountbatten of Burma with a countdown calendar to the Transfer of Power in the background.

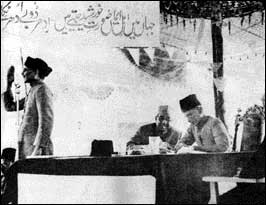
Chaudhry Khaliquzzaman seconding the Lahore Resolution with Muhammad Ali Jinnah presiding the Lahore session.

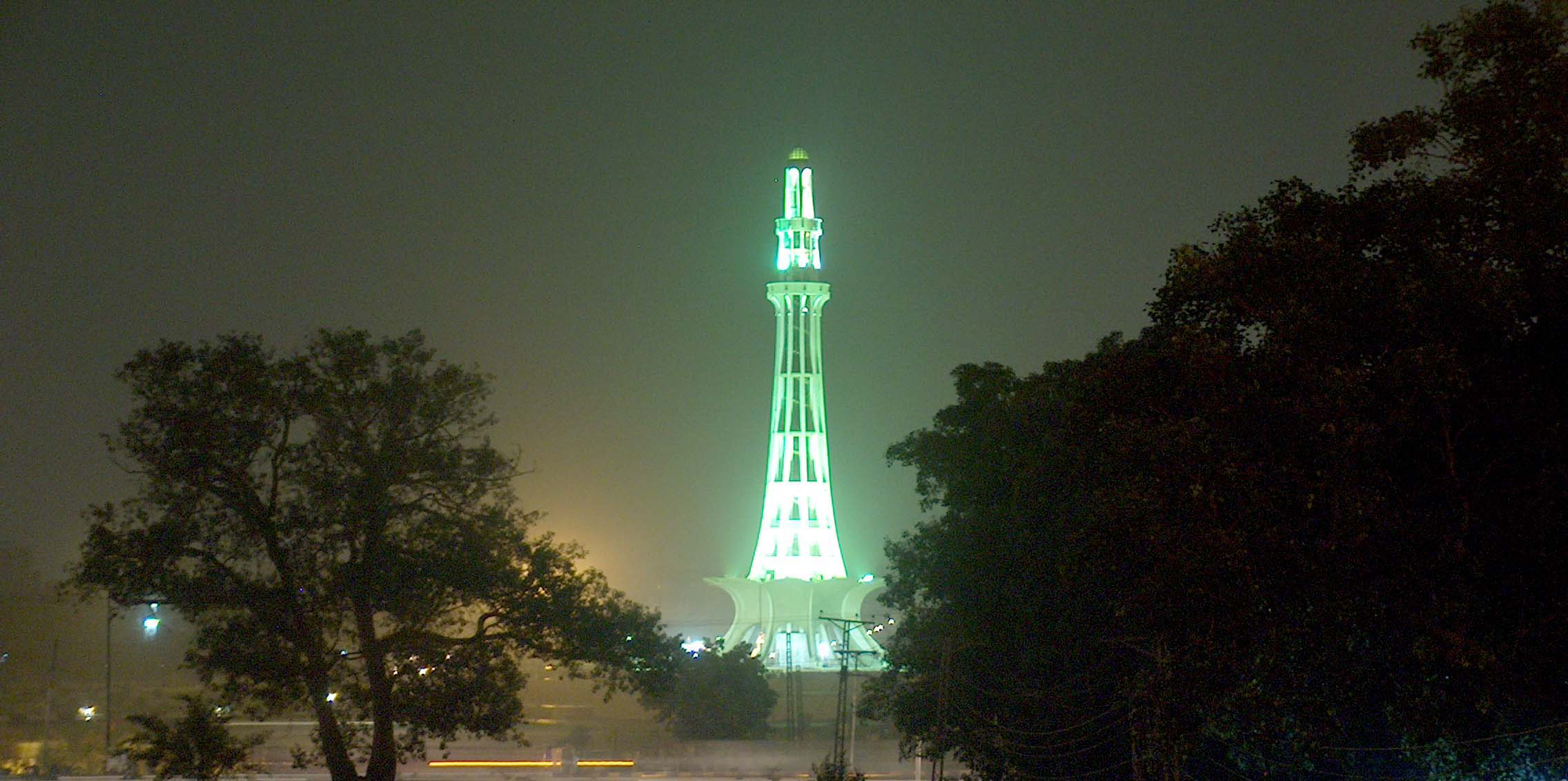
Minar-e-Pakistan, where the Pakistan Resolution was passed.

Lahore enjoys a special position in the history of Pakistan Movement and Indian Independence Movement. The 1929 Congress session was held at Lahore. In this Congress, a resolution of "complete independence" was moved by Pandit Nehru and passed unanimously at midnight on 31 December 1929.

Lahore prison was a place to detain revolutionary freedom fighters. Noted freedom fighter Jatin Das died in Lahore prison after fasting for 63 days in protest of British treatment of political prisoners. One of the martyrs in the struggle for Indian independence, Shaheed Sardar Bhagat Singh, was hanged in Lahore Jail.

The most important session of the All India Muslim League, later the Pakistan Muslim League, was held in Lahore in 1940. Muhammad Ali Jinnah, leader of the league, publicly proposed the Two Nation Theory for the first time and demanded a separate homeland for Muslims of India.

The predominantly Muslim population supported Muslim League and Pakistan Movement. After the independence of Pakistan in 1947, the minority Hindus and Sikhs migrated to India while the Muslim refugees from India settled in the Lahore District.

=== Post-independence till present ===
Lahore is regarded as the heart of Pakistan and is now the capital of the Punjab province in the state of Pakistan. Almost immediately after the independence, large scale riots broke out among Muslims, Sikhs and Hindus, causing many deaths as well as damage to historic monuments—including the Lahore Fort, Badshahi Mosque and other colonial buildings. With United Nations assistance, the government was able to rebuild Lahore, and most scars of the communal violence of independence were erased. Less than 20 years later, however, Lahore once again became a battleground in the War of 1965. The battlefield and trenches can still be observed today close to the Wagah border area.

After independence, Lahore was eclipsed by Karachi, which quickly became the biggest and most industrialized city. It was not until the administration of Mian brothers, and the 1990s riots in Karachi that Lahore once again gained its significance as an economic and cultural powerhouse through government reforms. The second Islamic Summit Conference was held in the city. In 1996, the International Cricket Council Cricket World Cup final match was held at the Gaddafi Stadium in Lahore.

The Walled City of Lahore known locally as the "Un-droone Shehr" (Inner City) is the oldest and most historic part of Lahore. The Punjab government embarked on a major project in 2009 to restore the Royal Trail (Shahi Guzar Gah) from Akbari Gate to the Lahore Fort with the help of the World Bank under the Sustainable Development of the Walled City of Lahore (SDWCL) project. The project aims at the Walled City development, at exploring and highlighting economic potential of the Walled City as a cultural heritage, exploring and highlighting the benefits of the SWDCL project for the residents, and at soliciting suggestions regarding maintenance of development and conservation of the Walled City.

The present day Lahore is a three-in-one city. That is why, when one visits Lahore; he finds three different cities – each distinguished from other in one way or other. The old city – existed for at least a thousand years – developed in and around circular road. Similarly, the British built Lahore covers the area from Mayo Hospital to the Nahr on the east. Unquestionably, third Lahore which includes various posh localities such as Gulberg, Bahria Town, Johar Town, Defence Housing Authority along with several others developed after the independence. Samnabad is a major residential area and administrative subdivision of Lahore, Pakistan. It is the one of Oldest Posh areas of Lahore and located in the center of City.

== Historiography of Lahore ==
The first prominent British work covering Lahore's history was History and Antiquities of Lahore (1861, reprinted in 1868) by Thomas Henry Thornton which served as a guidebook for European visitors to the city, influencing British officials' views of the city. The original publication was followed by an expanded edition in 1876 co-authored by John Lockwood Kipling. A gazatteer dedicated to the settlement was Gazetteer of the Lahore District 1883–84 edited by Denzil Ibbetson. Other British colonial works which covered the city were the Punjab Settlement Report 1865–69 (published by Leslie Saunders in 1873) and Imperial Gazetteer. A book by Henry Raynor Goulding on Lahore titled Old Lahore: Reminiscences of a Resident was published in 1924. In 1994, Anis Nagi published Ancient Lahore: A Brief Account of the History and Antiquities of Lahore, which is a reprint of the first section of a lost guidebook on Lahore by an unknown writer (likely Thornton) authored in 1860 under the instruction of Robert Montgomery.

Native writers who authored works on the city include Nur Ahmad Chishti (in 1867), Mufti Ghulam Sarwar Qureshi Lahori (his Tarikh-e Makhzan-e Punjab: Punjab ka Qadeem Encyclopaedia in 1877), Kanhaya Lal (in 1884), and Syad Muhammad Latif (in 1892). Khan Muhammad Waliullah Khan authored a work in 1961 titled Lahore and Its Important Monuments. In 1996, Ihsan H. Nadiem authored Lahore: A Glorious Heritage. Other writers include Kamil Khan Mumtaz (in 1989), Nazir Ahmed Chaudhry (in 1998), and F. S. Aijazuddin (in 2004).

== See also ==
- Timeline of Lahore history
