= Abu al-Barakat Munir Lahori =

Punjabi poet (1610–1644)

Abū'l-Barakāt Munīr Lāhūrī
- Born: 28 November 1610; Lahore, Punjab, Mughal Empire
- Died: 9 September 1644 (aged 33); Agra, Mughal Empire
- Resting place: Lahore (in present-day Punjab, Pakistan)
- Occupation: Poet
- Writing career
- Language: Persian language
- Years active: 1624–1644

Abu al-Barakat Munir Lahori (Persian: ابوالبرکات منیر لاہوری, romanized: Abū'l-Barakāt Munīr Lāhawrī) commonly known as Mollā Monīr Lāhūrī (1610 – 1644) was a Punjabi poet and prose writer of the Persian language active during the reign of the Mughal emperor Shah Jahān.

== Background ==
Born on 28 November 1610 in a Punjabi family, Munīr was a native of Lahore. His father, ʿAbd al-Jalīl Ḥāfiẓ Abū Isḥāq, was a master calligrapher employed by emperor Akbar. His two brothers, Abū l-Fayḍ (pen name Fayḍā "Grace") and Abū l-Fatḥ (pen name Ḍamīr "Heart") were also poets.

== Career ==
Munīr began his career as a poet at the age of fourteen. In 1635, he entered the service of Mīrzā Ṣafī Sayf Khān, governor of Akbarabad (Agra) and brother-in-law of the queen, Momtāz Maḥall. He accompanied Sayf Khān when the latter was appointed as governor of Bengal. After Sayf Khān's death in 1639, Munīr joined the court of Shāpūr Mīrzā Iʿtiqād Khān, the governor of Jaunpur but soon returned to Akbarabad, where he was admitted to the inner circles of the court poets. He spent his last years in Agra, where he died young on 9 September 1644 and was buried in Lahore.

== Literary works ==
Recognised as one of the three major poets of Lahore during the reign of Shah Jahān, Munīr was a prolific writer and claimed to have written over 100,000 verse couplets. His contemporaries such as Chandarbhān Brahman and Moḥammad Ṣāleḥ Kanbōh considered him as one of the most accomplished poets of their era. One of his better known mathnavīs is Maẓhar-i gul ("The rose's manifestation"), also called Maṯnawī dar ṣefat-e Bengāla, which was written in 1639 and describes the flora, fauna and climate of the Bengal region. It has been published several times since 1889. Collections of his letters were published as Inshā-yi Munīr ("Brilliant compositions") and Nawbāva ("First-fruits"). In his short work Kārnāma ("Chronicle"), written in 1640, he pointed out serious literary defects in the poetry of Mughal poets ʿOrfī, Ṭāleb Āmolī, Ẓohūrī and Ẓolālī, and defended Khorasani style of poetry over sabk-i hindī. This work began a literary debate in Mughal India and resulted in a refutation written by Indo-Persian poet Sirāj al-Dīn Ārzū under the title Sirāj-i munīr (“Shining lamp”). Munīr was a childhood friend of Lahore-based scholars Moḥammad Ṣāleḥ Kanbōh and ʿInayatullāh Kanbōh, and wrote introduction to the collected volumes of inshaʿ of both brothers. Much of his later works, both prose and poetry, are full of homesickness for Lahore, its gardens and literary places.
