= The Garden of Knowledge =

18th century Indian manuscript

- National Library of Poland
- Also known as: Bahar-i Danish (or The Springtime of Knowledge)
- Date: 1784
- Language(s): Persian
- Size: 39x23,5 cm and less, 207 leaves
- Accession: Rps BOZ 182

The Garden of Knowledge is an illustrated manuscript of the collection of stories in the Persian about the love between the fictional Mughal Prince Jahandar Shah and his queen Bahrewar Banu, originally written by Inayatullah Kambu in the 17th-century and titled the Bahar-i Danish (or The Springtime of Knowledge), that was published in 1784.

The original author, Inayatullah Kambu, was a scholar, writer, and poet who lived in 17th-century India. His work is structured as a frame narrative, similar to One Thousand and One Nights. In addition to the main plot there are many fantastic tales within the work.

The 1784 manuscript was acquired for the collection of Stanisław Kostka Zamoyski in 1803 in London by English orientalist William Ouseley. In 1944, it was taken by Germans to Goerbitsch, from where the Russians transported it to Moscow. It returned to Poland in 1958 and entered the collection of the National Library of Poland. From May 2024, the manuscript is presented at the permanent exhibition in the Palace of the Commonwealth.

== Bibliography ==
- Makowski, Tomasz; Sapała, Patryk, eds. (2024). The Palace of the Commonwealth. Three times opened. Treasures from the National Library of Poland at the Palace of the Commonwealth. Warsaw: National Library of Poland.
