= Bahar-i Danish =

Persian collection of romantic tales

Example from an 18th-century manuscript, called The Garden of Knowledge, held in the National Library of Poland.

The Bahar-i Danish ('Spring of Knowledge') was a Persian collection of romantic tales adapted from earlier Indian sources by Inayat Allah Kamboh in Delhi in 1651.

== English translations ==
The book was partially translated into English by Alexander Dow in 1768 or 1769, and Jonathan Scott translated it completely in 1799. The Persian text was also lithographed several times in the 19th century.

== 18th-century illustrated manuscripts ==
No early illustrated copy of the manuscript has survived, though a pair of 18th-century illustrated manuscripts, from the collections of the Duke of Northumberland and that of Richard Johnson, may reflect 17th-century illustrative traditions. Another 18th-century manuscript of the work, known as The Garden of Knowledge, is held in the National Library of Poland.

== Adaptation by Thomas Moore ==
One of the tales in the Bahar-i Danish provided Thomas Moore with the plot of his 1817 verse-novel Lalla-Rookh.

== Translations ==
- Bahar-Danush; or, garden of knowledge. An oriental romance. Translated from the Persic of Einaiut Oollah by Jonathan Scott, 1799. Digital version at the Packard Humanities Institute
