= Jonathan Scott (orientalist) =

English orientalist (1754-1829)

Jonathan Scott (1754–1829) was an English orientalist, best known for his translation of the Arabian Nights.

== Life ==
Born at Shrewsbury, he was the third son of Jonathan Scott of Shrewsbury by Mary, daughter of Humphrey Sandford of the Isle near the town. John Scott-Waring was his eldest brother.

Scott received his first education in the Shrewsbury Royal Free Grammar School, but left in his thirteenth year to travel to India with his two elder brothers, John and Richard. Jonathan was gazetted to a cadency in 1770, and two years later to an ensigncy in the 29th native infantry of the Carnatic. He became a lieutenant in 1777, and captain in 1778. He gained the patronage of Warren Hastings, then governor-general of Bengal, who appointed him his Persian secretary.

Scott in 1784 took part in founding the Royal Asiatic Society of Bengal, of which body he remained a member until 1799. Hastings left India in February 1785, and as Scott resigned his commission in January of that year, it may be presumed that he returned to England about the same time.

In 1802 Scott was appointed professor of oriental languages at the Royal Military College, but resigned that post in 1805. He held, about the same time, a similar position at the East India College at Haileybury. In 1805 the honorary degree of D.C.L. was conferred upon him by the University of Oxford in recognition of his attainments in oriental literature. Samuel Lee, the orientalist. was helped by Scott.

Scott died on 11 February 1829 at his residence in St. John's Row, Shrewsbury, and was buried near his parents in the bishop's chancel of old St. Chad's Church there.

== Works ==
In 1786 Scott published his first work, A Translation of the Memoirs of Eradut Khan; being anecdotes by a Hindoo Noble, of the Emperor Alumgeer Aurungzebe, and his successors Shaw Alum and Jehaundar Shaw. This was followed in 1794 by a Translation of Ferishita's History of the Dekkan from the first Mahummedan Conquests, with a continuation from other native writers, to the reduction of its last Monarchs by the Emperor Alumgeer Arungzebe. Also with a History of Bengal from the accession of Ali Verdee Khan to the year 1780, 2 vols. These works were followed by the Bahar Danush, or Garden of Knowledge; an Oriental Romance translated from the Persic of Einaiut Oollah, 1799, 3 vols., and by Tales, Anecdotes, and Letters from the Arabic and Persian, 1809,. The last includes a number of tales translated from a fragment of a manuscript of the Thousand and One Nights, procured in Bengal by James Anderson.

In 1811 Scott published the work by which he is known, his edition of the Arabian Nights Entertainments, in 6 vols. Edward Wortley Montagu had brought back from Turkey a nearly complete manuscript of the work (now in the Bodleian Library) written in 1764. Scott proposed to make a fresh translation from this manuscript, and printed a description of it, together with a table of contents, in William Ouseley's Oriental Collection. He abandoned the idea later on, and contented himself with revising Antoine Galland's French version (1704–1717), saying that he found it so correct that it would be pointless to go over the original again. He prefixed a copious introduction, and added some additional tales from the Anderson and Wortley Montague manuscripts that he had obtained. The work was the earliest effort to render the Arabian Nights into literary English. It was popular, and was republished in Edinburgh (with illustrations by S. J. Groves) in one volume in 1869, in London in 1882, 4 vols., and again in 1890, 4 vols.

== Family ==
Scott married his cousin Anne, daughter of Daniel Austin, M.A., rector of Berrington, Shropshire, who survived him. By her he had issue a son who died young, and a daughter, Anna Dorothea, who married her cousin, R. W. Stokes of London.
