= Saleh Kamboh Mosque =

Mosque in Lahore, Punjab, Pakistan

- صالح کمبوہ مسجد
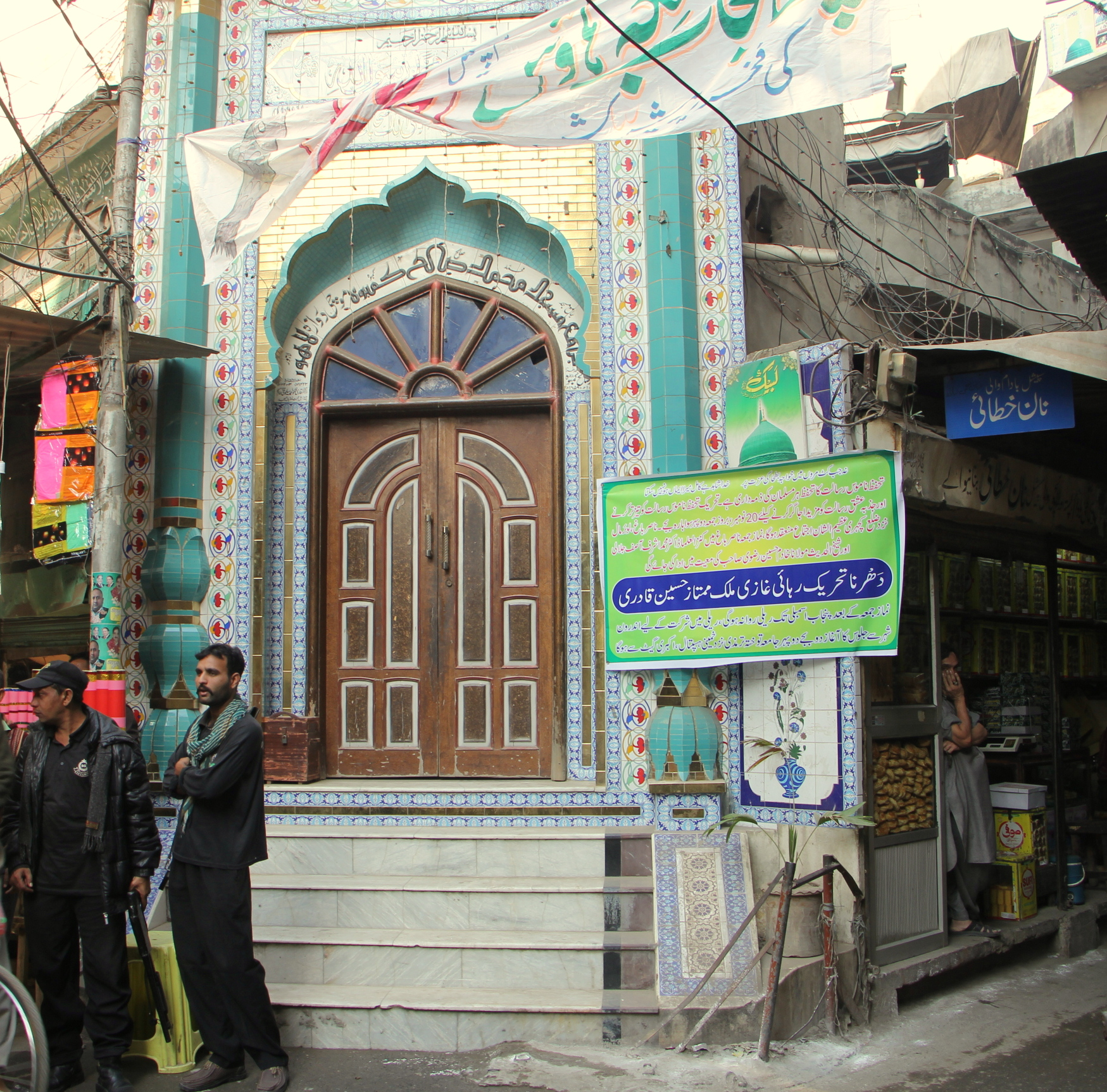

Religion
- Affiliation: Islam
- Branch/tradition: Hanafi

Location
- Location: Lahore, Punjab, Pakistan

Architecture
- Type: mosque
- Style: Islamic
- Established: 1659
- Dome: 3

The Saleh Kamboh Mosque (Urdu: صالح کمبوہ مسجد) is a mosque located in Lahore in the Pakistani province of Punjab. The mosque was built by Muhammad Saleh Kamboh, a court historian during the reign of Mughal emperor Shah Jahan. Although the mosque was built during the reign of Aurangzeb, it includes features of Shahjahani architecture.

== Background ==
Muhammad Saleh Kamboh was a calligrapher and court historian during the reign of Mughal emperor Shah Jahan. He has been credited with compiling Shahjahannama, a biography of Shah Jahan. In addition to being a commander of five hundred soldiers, he also served as a governor of the Punjab province. According to historic records, he died while fighting during the tenure of Bengal governor Islam Khan II. The mosque was built by Saleh Kamboh in 1659 AD.

== Architecture ==
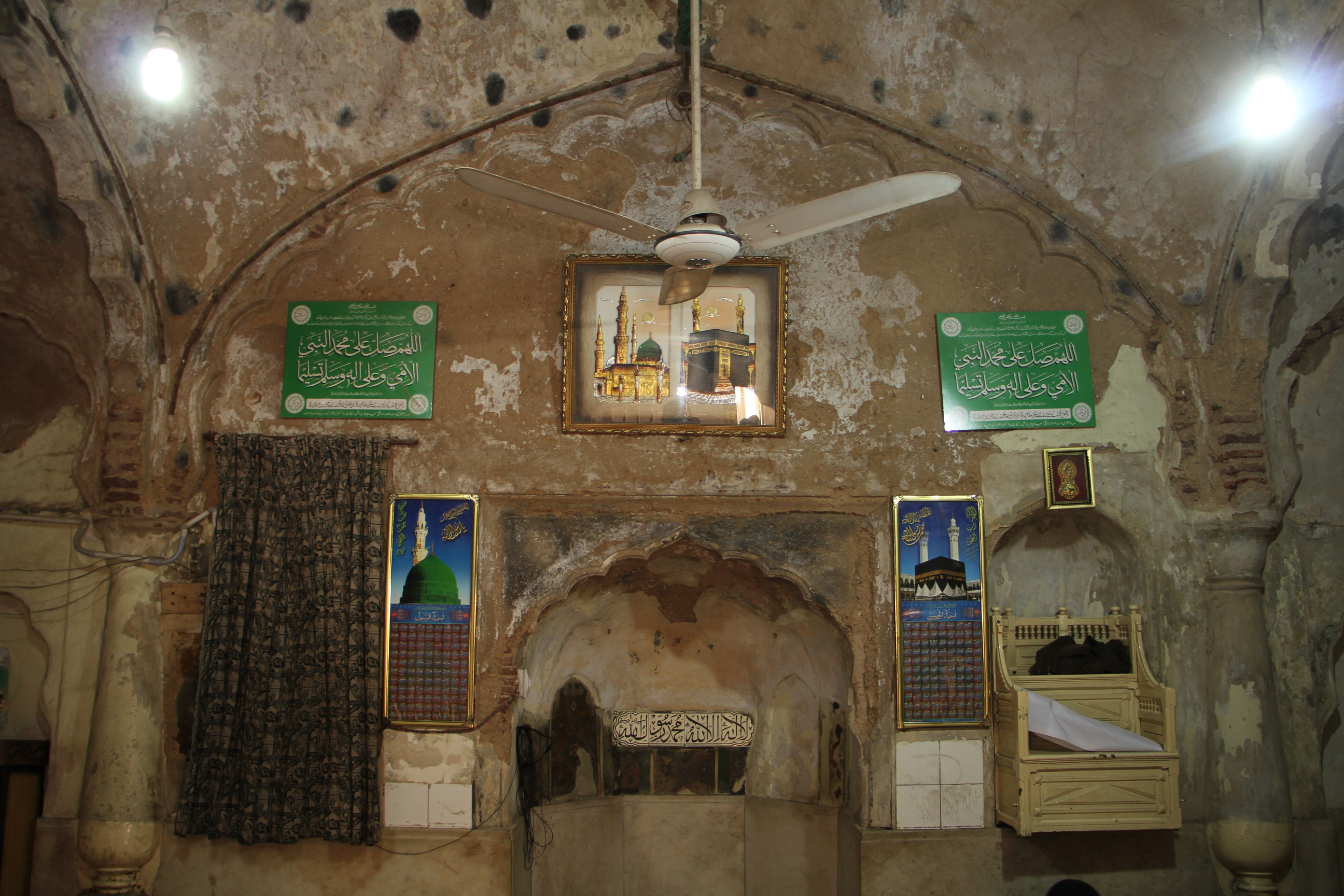
Prayer hall of the mosque

Although the mosque was built during the reign of Mughal emperor Aurangzeb, architectural features of the Shah Jahani era are present in the mosque; these include floral arabesque, interlacement kashi, fresco works, and multifoil arches in the interior of the mosque. The mosque has three domes. Although the façade has been reconstructed, it still bears the inscription of the mosque's name. Pakistan Today wrote that the inner walls were once decorated like the walls of the Wazir Khan Mosque and the Sunehri Masjid.

Rai Bahadur Kanhaiyalal, in his book, Tareek-e-Lahore wrote:

This wonderful mosque is situated inside the Mochi Gate. Whoever enters the city through Mochi Gate finds this magnificent and colourful building straight from the Mochi Gate. This small mosque was once very comprehensive and beautiful.

== Conservation ==
A local body, Anjuman-e-Tajran Mochi Gate, is responsible for the maintenance of the mosque. The Archaeology Department of Punjab province has declared the mosque as a protected monument. There are also shops infringing upon the premises of the mosque.
