= Ihsan H. Nadiem =

Pakistani historian

Ihsan H. Nadiem (born 1940) is a Pakistani archaeologist, museologist, author and poet.

== Early life and career ==
Born in Sahiwal (old name of the city is Montgomery), Punjab, British India, Nadiem studied at Government College, Lahore, and did his postgraduation in Geography from the University of the Punjab. In 1961, he was then trained as archaeologist on a scholarship by the Government of Pakistan. At a later stage, he specialised in Museology on a French Government Fellowship. He joined the Department of Archaeology, Pakistan and excavated at Banbhore, Swat (Pant, Saidu-I and Saidu-II), Moenjodaro and Tulamba. As a museum curator, he was in charge of museums at Harappa, Umerkot, Moenjodaro, Lahore Fort and Taxila.

He managed the regional offices of the department at Peshawar and Quetta before being posted as officer ncharge of the Publications Branch, which he reactivated after it had remained dormant for 13 years. He launched the Pakistan Institute of Archaeological Training and Research (PIATR) at Lahore and co-ordinated it following its launch. He was the Director General of Punjab Archaeology at Lahore, and then Southern Circle of Archaeology at Hyderabad (Sindh)/Karachi. These assignments entailed archaeological research and maintenance and administration of antiquities in the Pakistani provinces of Punjab and North West Frontier – in the former case – and Sindh and Balochistan in the latter case. He retired from active government service in 2000 and is now an author on the cultural heritage of Pakistan.

He has also served as professor in the University of Engineering and Technology, Lahore where he structured courses on "Conservation of Architectural Heritage" as a subject for master's degree in architecture. He has published about twenty five research papers in different journals of international repute; over 250 articles on cultural heritage of Pakistan appearing in various dailies and periodicals and an excavation report in two volumes, from Rome. In addition, he edited Pakistan Archaeology volume 10–22, and prepared and published professional and technical reports.

He also writes English poetry. His poems have appeared in different publications, and as collections entitled Illusory Trance(now out of print) and Golden Rays. His book on Moenjodaro, Heritage of Mankind was first published in 1994, and the edition sold out within months. Its second edition, revised and enlarged, was published in 1995 and a third edition three years later. He has so far published 27 books from the House of Sang-e-Meel Publications and 3 books from Alfaisal Publishers, both at Lahore, on the cultural heritage of Pakistan. In addition his book - Subjects and Themes in the Holy Qur'an, in two volumes - has also been published by Alfaisal Publishers, Lahore. Since 2010 he is working as Director in Dyal Singh Research & Cultural Forum - an institute devoted to the study and research in the culture, language and history of Punjab (on both side of the divide between Pakistan and India)

== Publications ==
Ihsan H. Nadiem's books are based on his 32 years of archaeological research work. He's quoted as saying, "I wanted to write books that were not voluminous, that were not burdened with technical jargon and in which facts and figures did not dominate the writing".

=== Books published by Sang-e-Meel Publications, Lahore, Pakistan ===
- A Brief History of Pakistan - From the Earliest Times (ISBN 978-969-35-3033-9)
- Destination Pakistan ISBN 978-969-35-3075-9)
- Lahore - A Glorious Heritage, 4th Revised Edition (ISBN 978-969-35-0718-8)
- Islamabad, Pothohar, Taxila Valley and Beyond.(ISBN 969-35-1904-3)
- Golden Rays - poems. (ISBN 969-35-0834-3)
- Punjab and the Indian Revolt of 1857 (ISBN 969-35-1806-3)
- Portrait of Punjab: Land – History – People. (2009) ISBN 978-969-35-2251-8
- Cholistan to Bahawalpur: Physiography, Past, People & Places. (2009) ISBN 978-969-35-2178-8
- Balochistan': Land, History, People. (2007) ISBN 969-35-2023-8
- Peshawar: History & Cultural Heritage (2007) ISBN 969-35-1971-X
- Islamabad: Pothohar, Taxila Valley & Beyond – History & Monuments (2006) ISBN 969-35-1904-3
- Historic Landmarks of Lahore: An account of protected Monuments (2006) ISBN 969-35-1869-1
- Portrait of North West Frontier Province (2006) ISBN 969-35-1825-X
- Gardens of Mughal Lahore (2004) ISBN 969-35-1699-0
- Buddhist Gandhara: History, Art and Architecture (2003) ISBN 969-35-1408-4

(This above book has also been translated into Sinhala language and published from Colombo, Sri Lanka; and Nepalese language and published from Kathmandu, Nepal

- Portrait of Sindh (2002) ISBN 969-35-1355-X
- Built Heritage of Pakistan: A Compendium of Architectural Legacy, Important Archaeological Sites and Historic Monuments (2002) ISBN 969-35-1329-0
- THAR – the Great Pakistani Desert: Land • History • People (2001) ISBN 969-35-1244-8
- Makli, The Necropolis at Thatta (2000) ISBN 969-35-1075-5
- Historic Mosques of Lahore (1998) ISBN 969-35-0940-4
- Lahore – A Glorious Heritage (Second Edition 2006) ISBN 969-35-0718-5
- Rohtas – Formidable Fort of Sher Shah (First published 1995, second edition 2004) ISBN 969-35-0603-0
- Moenjodaro – Heritage of Mankind (First published 1994, 3rd Revised Edition 2002) ISBN 969-35-0525-5
- Punjab and the Indian Revolt of 1857 (2006) ISBN 969-35-1806-3
- Golden Rays ISBN 969-35-0834-3
- Historic Mosques of Lahore (1998)

=== Books published by Al-Faisal Publications, Lahore, Pakistan ===
- Forts of Pakistan (2004) ISBN 969-503-352-0
- Punjab: Land, History, People. (2005) ISBN 978-969-503-434-7
- Themes and Subjects in the Holy Qur'an (two volumes) 2014 (ISBN 969-503-909-X & 969-503-910-3

BOOKS PUBLISHED BY DYAL SINGH RESEARCH & CULTURAL FORUM, LAHORE - PAKISTAN (Edited)

- Sardar Dyal Singh Majithia - As Seen By His Contemporaries (Second Revised Edition)
- The Rising of Khalsa....
- Bhagat Singh: Life and Philosophy
