= Timeline of Lahore =

The following is a timeline of the history of the city of Lahore, Pakistan.

== Prior to 11th century ==
- 664/682 CE – City besieged by Muslim forces led by Muhallab ibn Abi Sufra.

== 11th–15th centuries ==
- 1022 CE – Mahmud of Ghazni ousts Hindu rulers; Malik Ayaz in power.
- 1157 – City becomes Muslim Ghaznavid capital.
- 1241 – City sacked by Mongols.
- 1267 – Lahore Fort rebuilt.

== 16th–17th centuries ==
- 1524 – Mughal Babur in power.
- 1530 – Mir Yunis Ali becomes governor.
- 1560 – Masjid Niwin (mosque) built.
- 1566 - Lahore Fort built.
- 1584 – Mughal Akbar relocates capital to Lahore.
- 1622 – Court of Mughal Jehangir established.
- 1627
  - Khwabgah palace built.
  - Tomb of Jahangir built in Shahdara Bagh near city.
- 1632 – Shish Mahal (palace) built at Lahore Fort.
- 1634 – Wazir Khan Mosque built.
- 1635 – Moti Masjid (mosque) built at Lahore Fort.
- 1637
  - Shalimar Gardens laid out near city.
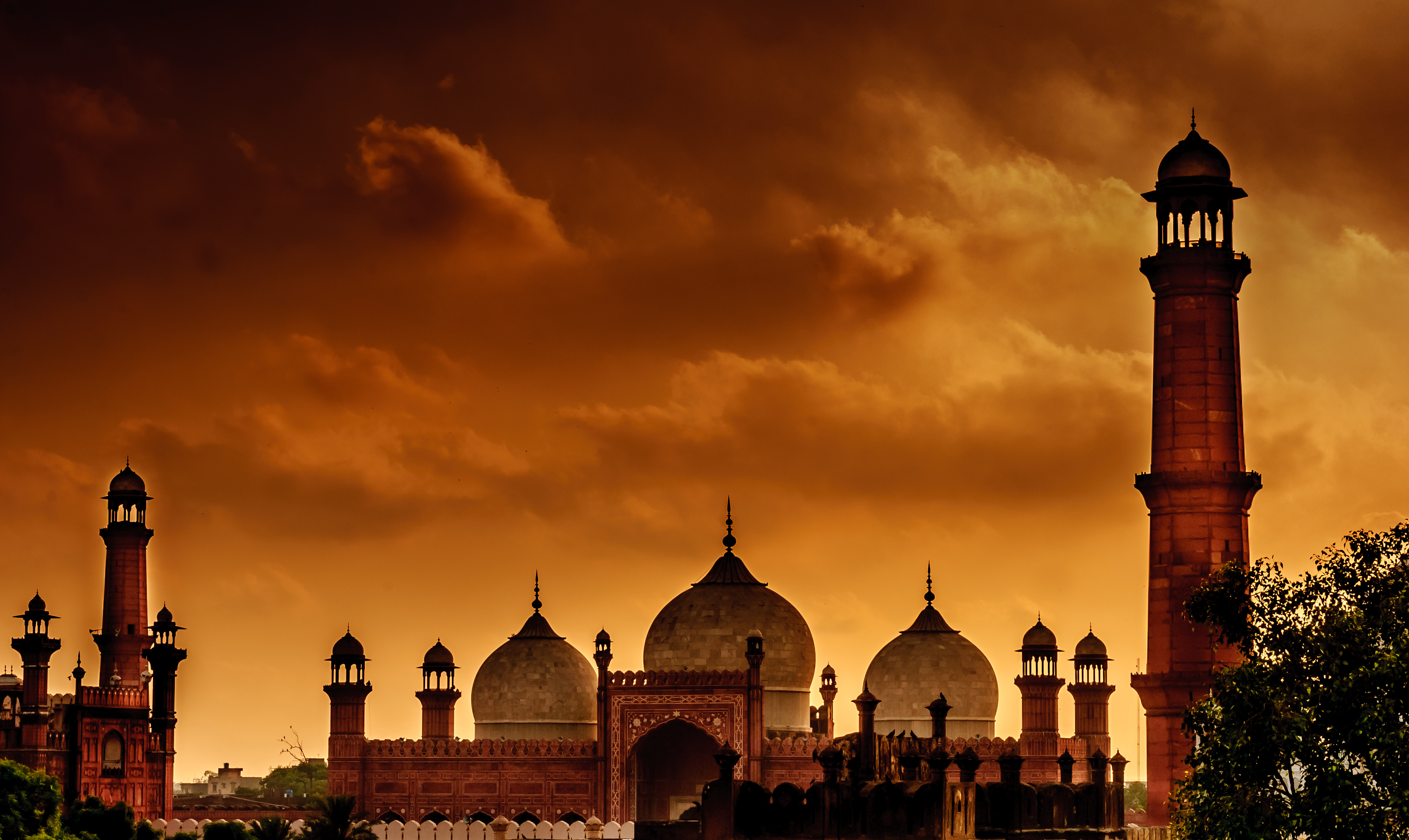
  - Badshahi Mosque built in 1673
- 1649 – Dai Anga Mosque built.
- 1673 – Badshahi Mosque built.

== 18th century ==
- 1739 – City captured by Persian forces under the command of Nader Shah.
- 1748 – Ahmed Shah Durrani in power.
- 1753 – Sunehri Mosque built in Dubbi Bazaar area.
- 1758 – Lahore Fort captured by Maratha forces under Raghunath Rao.
- 1759 – Marathas defeat the Durrani Empire in the Battle of Lahore.
- 1765 - Lehna Singh and Gujar Singh of the Sikh Bhangi Misl (Punjab), occupy Lahore.
- 1779 - Timur Shah Returns to Punjab to Punish the Sikhs (1776-1780)
- 1798 – Ranjit Singh in power.
- 1799 – Ranjit Singh occupies Lahore. and shifts his capital from Gujrawala.

== 19th century ==
- 1813–1818 – Hazuri Bagh Baradari built.
- 1846 – British Council of Regency of the Punjab established.
- 1849
  - 3 January: British East India Company in power.
  - Lahore Chronicle newspaper begins publication.
- 1850s – Grand Trunk Road Peshawar-Lahore extension constructed (approximate date).
- 1858 November 1 – British Crown in power.
- 1859 – Masonic Temple built in Anarkali.
- 1860
  - Amritsar-Lahore train begins operating.
  - Lahore Junction railway station built.
- 1861 – Nahr canal built (approximate date).
- 1864 – Government College and Rang Mahal School founded.
- 1868 – Population: 125,413.
- 1872
  - Lahore Zoo founded.
  - Civil and Military Gazette begins publication.
- 1875 – Mayo School of Industrial Art established.
- 1880 – Faletti's Hotel in business.
- 1881
  - Tribune newspaper begins publication.
  - Population: 149,369.
- 1882 – Punjab University and Lahore Bar Association founded.
- 1883 – Central Model School established.
- 1884 – Punjab Public Library established.
- 1885 – Punjab Civil Secretariat Library founded.
- 1886
  - Aitchison College founded.
  - Khalsa Akhbar Lahore Punjabi-language newspaper begins publication.
- 1887
  - General Post Office, Lahore built.
  - Anglican Cathedral Church of the Resurrection consecrated.
- 1889
  - Lahore High Court building constructed.
  - Railway Technical School established.
- 1890 – New town hall built.
- 1892 – Punjab Textbook Board Library established.
- 1894 – Lahore Museum opens.
- 1898 – April: Punjab Assembly passes first law.

== 20th century ==
- 1901 – Population: 202,964.
- 1904 - Sacred Heart Cathedral completed.
- 1908 – Dyal Singh Trust Library established.
- 1909 – Punjab Chiefs' Association headquartered in city.
- 1915 – Lahore Conspiracy Case trial held.
- 1921
  - Model Town suburb established.
  - Mughalpura Technical College founded.
- 1924 – Punjab Archival Museum and record office established.
- 1928 – Armoury Museum established in Lahore Fort.
- 1935 – Punjab Assembly Chamber built.
- 1940
  - March: City hosts Lahore Resolution proceedings of the All-India Muslim League.
  - Nawa-i-Waqt Urdu-language newspaper begins publication.
- 1941
  - Jamaat-e-Islami Pakistan political party headquartered in city.
  - Population: 671,659.

== Independence ==
- 1947
  - Riots.
  - 15 August: City becomes part of West Punjab province of Pakistan.
- 1948 - Chatan newspaper begins publication.
- 1951
  - Institute of Islamic Culture established.
  - Population: 849,476.
- 1952 – Lahore newspaper begins publication.
- 1953 – 6 March: Martial Law promulgated in Lahore to control disturbances against Ahmadis.
- 1955 – City becomes capital of West Pakistan.
- 1959 – Gaddafi Stadium built.
- 1964 – 26 November: Pakistan Television Lahore Station inaugurated.
- 1965 – Indo-Pakistani War.
- 1968 – Minar-e-Pakistan constructed in Iqbal Park.
- 1970
  - Lahore Stock Exchange founded.
  - Pakistan Monitor newspaper begins publication.
- 1972 – Population: 2,165,372.
- 1974 – City hosts Islamic Summit Conference. Recognized former East Pakistan as Bangladesh.
- 1975 – Lahore Development Authority established.
- 1976 – Samjhota Express Amritsar-Lahore train begins operating.
- 1977 – Allama Iqbal Museum inaugurated.
- 1981
  - Minhaj-ul-Quran International (Islamic organization) founded.
  - Population: 2,952,689.
  - Lahore Zoo Safari established.
- 1983 – Ajoka (theatre group) formed.
- 1984 – Lahore University of Management Sciences and Lahore Conservation Society established.
- 1985 – Punjab Lok Rehas (theatre group) formed.
- 1986 – The Nation newspaper begins publication.
- 1989 – The Friday Times begins publication.
- 1990
  - Lahore Drama School and Institute of Leadership and Management founded.
  - Daily Pakistan newspaper begins publication.
  - February: 1990 Men's Hockey World Cup held.
- 1991 – Pearl Mosque built.
- 1992 – Alhamra Arts Council building constructed.
- 1993 – Zahoor ul Akhlaq Gallery established at the National College of Arts Lahore.
- 1996 – Lahore Post begins publication.
- 1997 – Lahore-Islamabad Motorway completed.
- 1998 – Population: 5,143,495.
- 1999
  - 21 February: City hosts signing of the India-Pakistan Lahore Declaration regarding nuclear armaments.
  - University of Lahore established.

== 21st century ==
- 2001 – Lahore City District divided into nine towns: Aziz Bhatti Town, Data Gunj Bakhsh Town, Gulberg Town, Iqbal Town, Lahore Cantonment, Ravi Town, Samanabad Town, Shalimar Town, Wagah Town.
- 2002 – Daily Times begins publication.
- 2003
  - Allama Iqbal International Airport inaugurated.
  - 11 July: Delhi-Lahore bus service resumes after suspension of 18 months.
- 2006 – Pakistan Fashion Design Council headquartered in city.
- 2007
  - March: Lawyers' Movement begins.
  - DHA Cinema opens.
  - Expo Centre Lahore built in Johar Town.
- 2009 – Software Technology Park and Alamgir Tower Lahore built.
- 2010
  - February: PFDC Sunsilk Fashion Week begins.
  - 28 May: Attacks on Ahmadi mosques.
  - 1 July: Bombings at Data Durbar Shrine.
  - 1 September: Bombings.
  - Vogue Towers opens.
  - Air pollution in Lahore reaches annual mean of 68 PM2.5 and 198 PM10, much higher than recommended.
- 2011 – The Lahore Times begins publication.
- 2012 – 11 September: Garment factory fire.
- 2013
  - February: Metrobus (Lahore) begins operating.
  - February: Lahore Literary Festival inaugurated.
  - March: Anti-Christian riot.
  - 6 July: Bombing in Old Anarkali district.
- 2014 - Grand Jamia Mosque inaugurated.
- 2017 - Population: 11,126,285.
- 2018 - Pakistan's Supreme Court quashed the conviction (under Blasphemy Law) and ordered the release of 47-year-old Aasia Bibi, a Christian woman from a village in Punjab province who had been on death row for eight years.
- 2019
  - 11 December: Attack on Punjab Institute of Cardiology, Lahore.
- 2020
  - 11 December: The statue of Maharaja Ranjit Singh (placed in Lahore Fort) was vandalized by an extremist who broke the left arm of statue. The man was immediately caught by a security guard and was later on arrested by Lahore Police.
  - 13 December: Pakistan Democratic Movement (a collation of 11 opposition parties) organized a power show at Minar-e-Pakistan (Greater Iqbal Park, Lahore) against the ruling government of Pakistan Tehreek-e-Insaf.

== See also ==
- History of Lahore
- List of educational institutions in Lahore
- History of the Punjab
- Timelines of other cities in Pakistan: Karachi, Peshawar
- Urbanisation in Pakistan

== Bibliography ==
=== Published in 19th century ===
- David Brewster, ed. (1830). "Lahore". Edinburgh Encyclopaedia. Edinburgh: William Blackwood.
- Khalid, Kanwal. "Lahore During The Ghaznavid Period: A Socio- Political and Cultural Study."
- C. Masson (September–November 1840), "Memorandum on Lahore, the Sikhs, their Kingdom and its Dependencies", Proceedings of the Bombay Geographical Society
- Charles Masson (1842), "Lahore", Narrative of Various Journeys in Balochistan, Afghanistan, and the Panjab, London: Richard Bentley
- J.H. Stocqueler (1854), "Lahore", Hand-book of British India (3rd ed.), London: Allen and Co.
- "Lahore". Street's Indian and Colonial Mercantile Directory for 1870. London: Street. 1870.
- Thornton, Thomas Henry. A Brief Account of the History and Antiquities of Lahore. Lahore: Government Civil Secretariat Press, 1873.
- Thomas Henry Thornton; John Lockwood Kipling (1876). Lahore. Lahore: Printed at the Government Civil Secretariat Press.
- Kanhaiya Lal. (1884) Tarikh-e-Lahore. Lahore, Pakistan: Aslam Asmat Printers.
- Edward Thornton (1886), "Lahore", in Roper Lethbridge and Arthur N. Wollaston (ed.), Gazetteer of the Territories under the Government of the Viceroy of India, London: W. H. Allen & Co., OCLC 710600
- Latif, Syad Muhammad (1892). Lahore: Its History, Architectural Remains and Antiquities. Lahore: New Imperial Press. OCLC 28302540.
- Edwin Lord Weeks (1894), "Lahore and the Punjab", Harper's New Monthly Magazine, vol. 89, pp. 650–672, hdl:2027/njp.32101064076175
- Joachim Hayward Stocqueler (1900), "Lahore", The Oriental Interpreter and Treasury of East India Knowledge, London: Cox

=== Published in 20th century ===
1900s–1940s

- "Lahore", A Handbook for Travellers in India, Burma, and Ceylon (8th ed.), London: J. Murray, 1911
- "Lahore" . Encyclopædia Britannica. Vol. 16 (11th ed.). 1911. pp. 81–82.
- H.A. Newell (c. 1921). Lahore (Capital of the Punjab): A guide to places of interest, with history and map (2nd ed.). Bombay.
- Lahore and some of its Historical Monuments. Lahore: Superintendent, Government Printing Press, 1927.
- Gulshan Lal Chopra. A Short History of Lahore and its Monuments. Lahore: 1937.
- "Lahawr". Encyclopaedia of Islam. Vol. 5. Leiden: E.J. Brill. c. 1938. OCLC 39715711.

1950s–1990s

- Muhammad Baqir (1952). Lahore, past and present; being an account of Lahore compiled from original sources. Lahore: Panjab University Press. OCLC 8816775.
- Lahore Development Authority. Lahore Urban Development and Traffic Study. 5 vols. Lahore, 1980.
- Lahore Development Authority. The Walled City of Lahore. Lahore, 1981.
- Samuel V. Noe. "Old Lahore and Old Delhi: Variations on a Mughal Theme." Ekistics XLIX (1982), pp. 306–19.
- Mohammed A. Qadeer. Lahore, Urban Development in the Third World. Lahore: Vanguard Books, 1983.
- Ahmad Nabi Khan. "Lahore: the Darus Saltanat of the Moghul Empire under Akbar (1556–1605)." Journal of the Research Society of Pakistan XXI, no.3 (1984), pp. 1–22.
- Muhammad Saeed (1989). Lahore, A Memoir. Lahore: Vanguard. ISBN 9694020085.
- F.S. Aijazuddin. Lahore: Illustrated Views of the 19th Century. Lahore: Vanguard Books, Ltd., 1991.
- Ajaz Anwar (1996). Old Lahore (3rd ed.). Lahore.
- Ajaz Anwar (1997), "Lahore and Delhi: Two Sides of a Mirror", India International Centre Quarterly, 24 (2/3): 274–283, JSTOR 23005453
- Som Anand (1998). Lahore, portrait of a lost city. Lahore: Vanguard Books.
- Nazir Ahmad Chaudhry. A Short History of Lahore and Some of Its Monuments. Lahore: Sang-e-Meel Publications, 2000.

=== Published in 21st century ===
- Journal of Asian Civilizations XXIV, no. 2 (2001). Special issue on Lahore in the Ghaznavid period.
- F.S. Aijazuddin. Lahore Recollected: An Album. Lahore: Sang-e-Meel Publishers, 2003.
- Y. Lari. Lahore – Illustrated City Guide. Karachi, Pakistan: Heritage Foundation Pakistan 2003.
- Mohammad Rafiq Khan (2006), "Banning Two-stroke Auto-rickshaws in Lahore: Policy Implications", Pakistan Development Review, 45 (4), Pakistan Institute of Development Economics: 1169–1185, doi:10.30541/v45i4IIpp.1169-1185, JSTOR 41260675
- P. Jackson; P.A. Andrews (2007). "Lahore (Lahawr)". In C.E. Bosworth (ed.). Historic Cities of the Islamic World. Leiden: Koninklijke Brill. p. 299+. ISBN 9789004153882.
- Ian Talbot. Divided Cities: Partition and Its aftermath in Lahore and Amritsar, 1947–1957. Karachi: Oxford University Press, 2006.
- William J. Glover (2007), Making Lahore Modern: Constructing and Imagining a Colonial City, USA: Univ of Minnesota Press, ISBN 9780816650217
- Abdul Rehman (2009), "Changing Concepts of Garden Design in Lahore from Mughal to Contemporary Times", Garden History, 37 (2): 205–217, JSTOR 27821596
