= Mufti Ghulam Sarwar Lahori =

Historian, theologian, researcher and lexicographer

- مفتی غلام سرور لاہوری
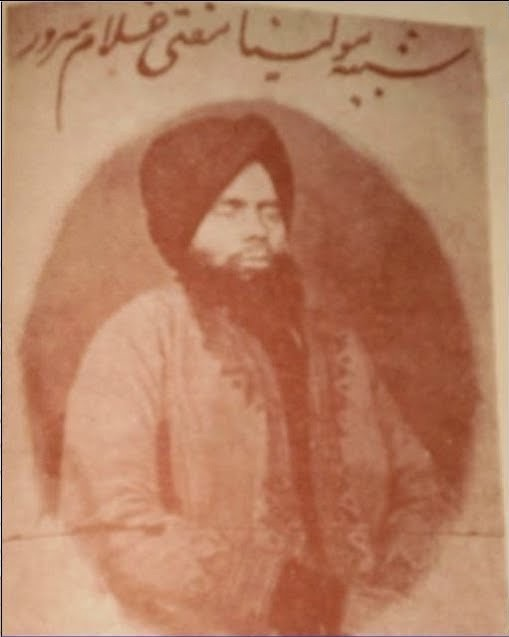
- Born: 1837; Lahore
- Died: 14 August 1890 (aged 52–53); Badr, Medina
- Occupations: Islamic scholar, Islamic jurist, Historian, theologian, researcher and lexicographer

Mufti Ghulam Sarwar Lahori (1837 - 14 August 1890) (Urdu: مفتی غلام سرور لاہوری) was an Islamic scholar, Islamic jurist, Historian, theologian, researcher and lexicographer.

== Literary works ==
He authored about 20 books.

- Baharistan-e-Tareekh: Gulzar-e-Shaahi (1877)
- Deewan Hamd-e-Izadi (1909)
- Deewan-e-Sarwari (1872)
- Ganjina-e-Sarwari
- Gulshan-e-Sarwari
- Hadiqat-ul-Auliya (1877)
- Hadiqat-ul-Auliya (1889)
- Hadiqat-ul-Auliya (1976)
- Insha-e-Safdari (1878)
- Jame-ul-Lughaat Urdu (1892)
- Khazinat-ul-Asfiya
- Naat-e-Sarwari (1911)
- Tareekh Makhzan-e-Punjab (1877)
- Yadgar-e-Asgari (1884)
- Zubdat-ul-Lughat aka Lughat-e-Sarvari (1877)
- Zubdat-ul-Lughat aka Lughat-e-Sarvari (1887)
