= Mochi Gate =

Former gate of the Walled City of Lahore, Pakistan

Coordinates: 31.5772°N 74.32155°E

The Mochi Gate, (Urdu: موچی دروازہ; Punjabi: موچی بوآ) is located in the south of the Walled City of Lahore between Akbari Gate and Shah Alam Gate in Lahore, Punjab, Pakistan.

It is one of the thirteen gates of the Walled City of Lahore which were built during the reign of the Mughal Emperor Akbar and were connected with a 30-feet high fortified wall for guarding the city. The gates were demolished during the early British rule, but were again constructed in the early 1900s. However during the riots of 1947, some gates were burnt down or got demolished, Mochi Gate being one of them. The gate does not exist any longer but the streets, mohallahs and buildings of high architectural value are still extant.

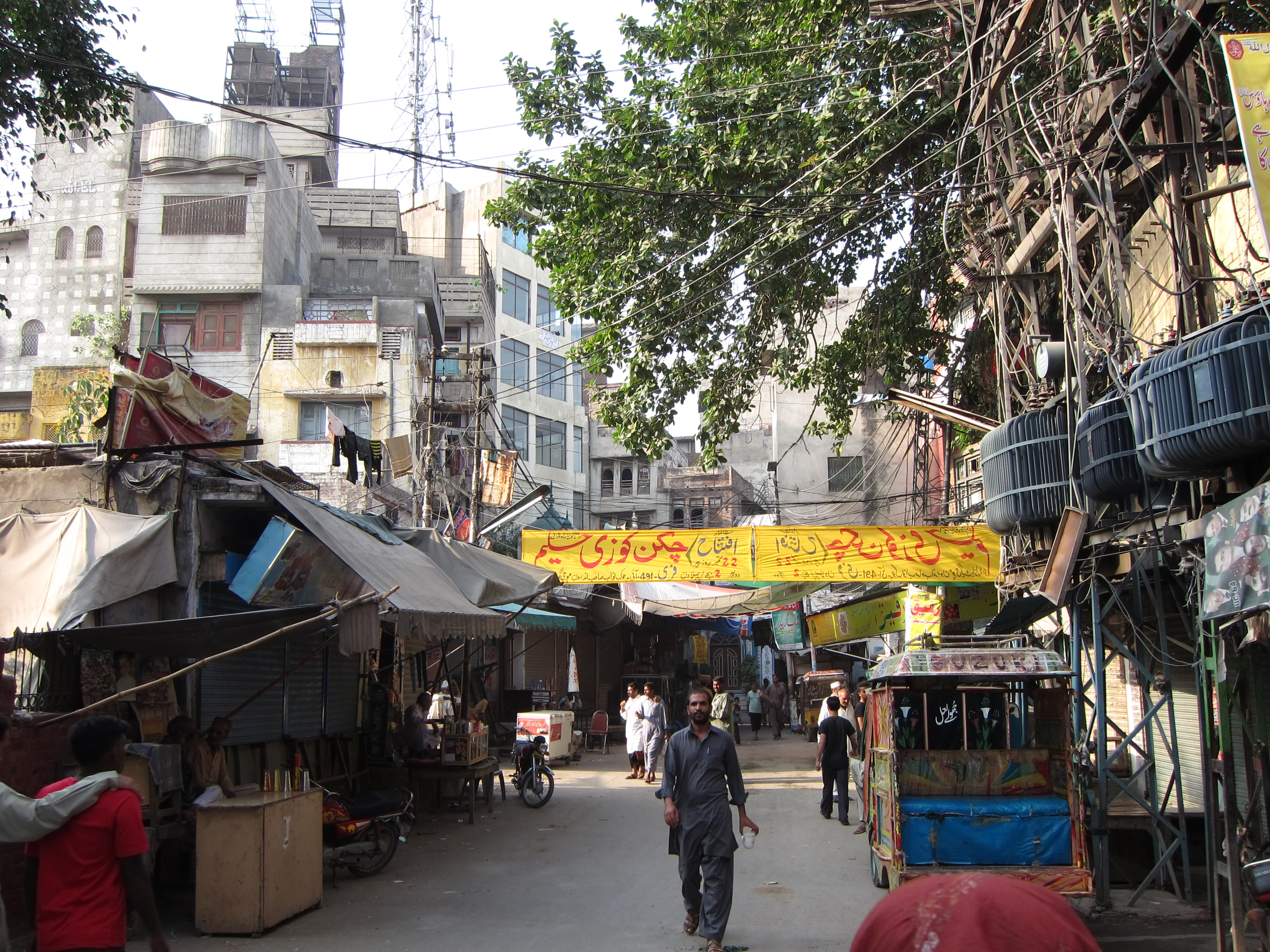
Mochi Gate entrance

There are several traditions associated with the name of the gate. According to some historians, it is named after Moti, a guard of the gate during the Mughal era, who guarded the gate. On the other hand, other historians believe that “Mochi” is the distorted form of the Urdu word “Morchi” which means “Trench Soldier”. The infantry units of governor of Lahore used to be stationed here. This theory is further supported by the fact that the different streets (mohallas) inside this gate still bear their old names like Mohalla Teer-garan (arrow craftsmen), and Mohalla Kaman-garan (bow craftsmen).

The bazaar around Mochi Gate is renowned for its shops of dried fruit, kites and fireworks. Mochi Gate is also known for historic mosque of Muhammad Saleh Kamboh, the teacher of the Mughal emperor Aurangzeb. Further inside is the Mohalla Shia, where the traditional Shia community of Lahore still gathers annually, in Muharram (first lunar month of the Islamic calendar) and Safar (second lunar month of the Islamic calendar) to carry out the Majaalis (Shia religious gatherings) and Maatum (self chest-beating) to commemorate the martyrdom of Imam Hussain and Imam Hassan, the grandsons of the Islamic prophet Muhammad. A number of Imaam Bargahs in the form of Havelis are situated here. Apart from their religious significance, some are a masterpiece depicting the architecture of their times. Mubarak Haveli, Nisar Haveli, Imam Bargh Akbar Ali Shah and Laal Haveli are, but a few examples.

== Mochi Bagh ==
Mochi Bagh or Garden (موچی باغ) is Pakistan's most famous political rally spot. Mochi Baagh is located on the immediate right of Mochi Gate. Many renowned political leaders of Pakistan and the per-independence era have delivered speeches here.

Until the late 1980s, it was commonly held that unless a politician could deliver a speech to a packed Mochi Baagh crowd they were not worth their political salt.

The Punjab government has approved plans to construct an underground parking area here to reduce traffic congestion.

== In popular culture ==
- In response to the opposition chanting slogans in the Pakistan assembly, the speaker Chaudhry Amir Hussain said “This is no Mochi Gate, Such slogans should not be raised in the assembly,”.

== See also ==
- Lahore Fort
- Badshahi Mosque
