= Alamgiri Gate =

Main gate of Lahore Fort, Pakistan

- دروازه عالمگیری
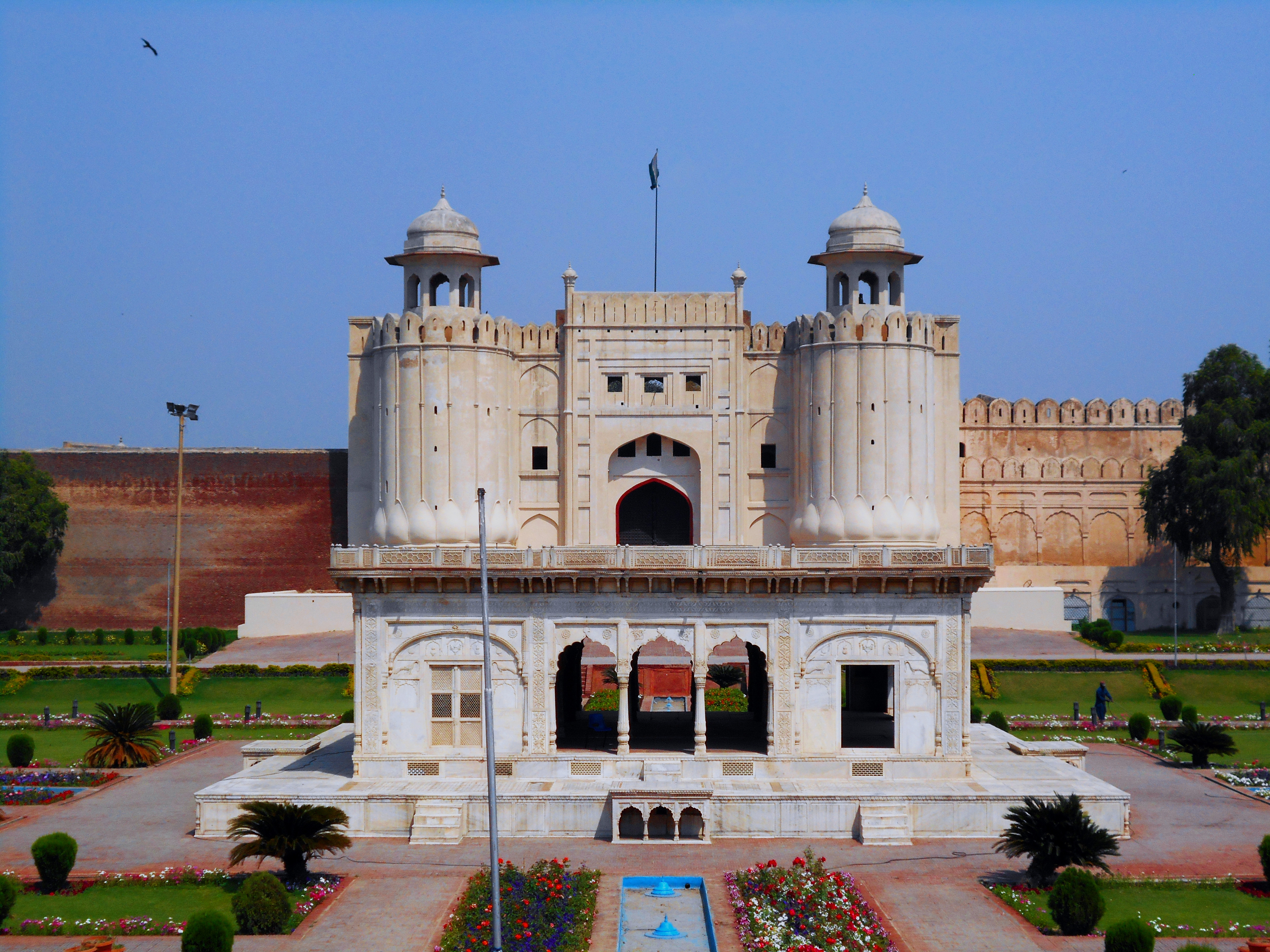
- Alamgiri Gate with Hazuri Bagh Baradari in front

General information
- Type: Public monument
- Location: Lahore, Pakistan
- Construction started: 1637 AD
- Completed: 1673 CE

Alamgiri Gate is an entrance of Walled City of Lahore in Lahore, Punjab, Pakistan. It was built by Mughal emperor Aurangzeb Alamgir in 1673, when he constructed the Badshahi Mosque. It is the only remaining original entranceway to the mosque and is a main entrance to Lahore Fort. Alamgiri Gate "exemplifies the final flourish of imperial Mughal gateway architecture".

== History ==
Alamgiri Gate is an entrance of the Walled City of Lahore in Lahore, Punjab, Pakistan. The walled city is a UNESCO World Heritage Site. The gate was built by Mughal emperor Aurangzeb Alamgir, the governor of Gwaliar, in 1673, whe he constructed the Badshahi Mosque. The gate is named for its builder. It is the only remaining original entranceway to the mosque and is also a main entrance to the Lahore Fort.

The gate was positioned on an axis through Hazuri Bagh and Badshahi Mosque, with Lahore Fort at the other end. The gate provided both security and privacy. Its scale humbled the visitors to Aurangzeb Alamgir's mosque and palace. In the evening, the illuminated gate created a glowing silhouette above the city.

The gate's opening was high enough to allow royal processions on caparisoned elephants to enter. In the early 19th century Maharaja Ranjit Singh used the gate as stables. Later, the British sealed the gate with bricks and divided the structure into military magazines.

Alamgiri Gate was conserved by the Punjab Walled Cities and Heritage Areas Authority in 2021. The gate was featured on the pre-2005 Pakistani fifty rupees note.

A panoramic view of Alamgiri Gate and Hazuri Bagh.

== Architecture ==
The Alamgiri Gate "exemplifies the final flourish of imperial Mughal gateway architecture". The 30 metres (98 ft) tall gate was constructed of red sandstone, imported from Rajasthan, and has accents of white Makrana marble. It has an iconic design, with a large central arched portal that is flanked by two semicircular fluted bastions with petal-shaped bases. Both have dome-shaped pavilions or chhatris. The structure also has four octagonal corner minarets.

The entire surface of the Alamgirir Gate is covered wth floral frescoes, Muqarnas niches, and Persian inscriptions. Above the central arch is a fourteen-line chronogram that was composed by Mullah Hamid Kashmiri, providing a completion date for the gate of 1084 AH. (1673–74 CE) This is one of the longest surviving Persian inscriptions in South Asia.
