= Muhammad Saleh Kamboh =

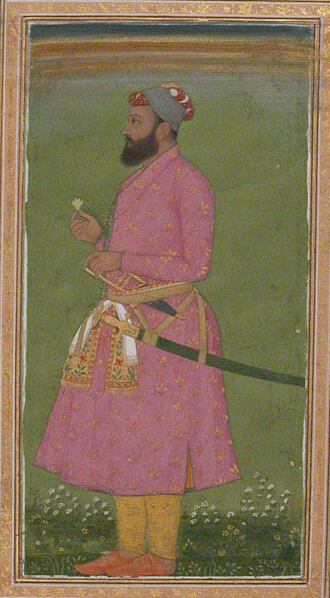
- Portrait of Muhammad Saleh Kamboh, 17th century, Metropolitan Museum of Art
- Born: Mughal Empire
- Died: c. 1675; Lahore, Subah of Lahore, Mughal Empire
- Education: Fluent in Arabic and Persian
- Occupations: Court chronicler Military commander
- Parent: Mir 'Abdullah Mushkin Qalam (father)
- Relatives: Inayat Allah Kamboh (brother)

Muhammad Saleh Kamboh Lahori was a noted Punjabi Muslim calligraphist and official biographer of emperor Shah Jahan and the teacher of emperor Aurangzeb.

Though a widely read person, little is known of the life of Muhammad Saleh Kamboh other than the works he composed. He was son of Mir Abdullah, Mushkin Kalam, whose title shows him to also have been a fine writer. He is believed to be younger brother of Inayat-Allah Kamboh and worked as a Shahi Dewan (minister) with the governor of Lahore. He held the rank of Sipahsalar.

== Biography ==
His father was Mir 'Abdullah Mushkin Qalam, a famous Mughal calligrapher.

In 1646, Muhammar Saleh replaced Abd al-Rashid Daylami chief librarian with Mir Salih. Around 1659 – 1660, he completed the Amal-i Salih or Shahjahan-nama. Amal-i-Salih is an account of the life and reign of Shah Jahan. However, the work also includes information on Shah Jahan's predecessors (particularly Akbar and Jahangir) and a compendium of biographies of the Shaikhs, poets, and other notables who were contemporaries with Shah Jahan. It is considered to be one of the most important original sources of events during Shah Jahan's reign. Muhammad Saleh was known as a poet by the Persian title Kashfi and by Arabic Subhan and is also stated to be an accomplished Urdu singer. Sometimes in 1651–1652, he was replaced from his position head librarian by I'timad Khan, the title bestowed upon Muhammad Ashraf, eldest son of Islam Khan, who served as paymaster of the army during that time.

During the rule of Aurangzeb, Muhammad Saleh served as his spiritual teacher. (Note: through IslamQA.info, Professor Muhammad al-Munajjid on his online correspondence has answered that he based his opinion Silk ad-Durar fi A‘yaan al-Qarn ath-Thaani ‘Ashar (4/113) and Aurangzeb biography by Professor ‘Abd al-Mun‘im an-Nimr in his book Tareekh al-Islam fi’l-Hind.) It is also stated that when Shaikh Makhdum was appointed as Sadr-us-sudur (chief justice) after death of Sadr Sharif Khan during the reign of Aurangzeb, Muhammad Salih Kamboh was appointed Peshdast (deputy). In the list of mansabdars, Muhammad Saleh Kamboh was recorded as a commander of five hundred soldiers. Along with Munnawar Khan, Muhammad Saleh maintained the Mughal empire's Dhow military transport fleets, and fought pirates.

=== Death ===
It is claimed by some accounts that Muhammad Saleh Kamboh served as a Mughal admiral and was killed while fighting alongside his fleet against the Ahoms at Pandu on Bengal-Assam border while helping general Abdus Salam, the Faujdar (infantry commander) of Hajo, during the tenure of Islam Khan Mashadi, the Mughal governor of Bengal. The event referred to above is said to date 1636 CE, which is incorrect, since Muhammad Saleh was very much alive and is known to have completed his Amal-i Salih in 1659/60 CE soon after Aurangzeb (Reign 1658 CE – 1707 CE) became the emperor of India in 1658 CE. According to Naimur Rehman Farooqi, the work was completed in 1669 CE.

The date of Muhammad Saleh's death is not certain. S. M. Latif states on unspecified authority in his works that Muhammad Saleh Kamboh died in A. H. 1085 (1675 CE).

A mosque known as Saleh Kamboh Mosque has been built with his name in Mochi Gate, Walled City of Lahore. He is buried in Lahore, though his grave location is currently disputed by the owners of the property.

== See also ==
- Ahmad Kamboh
- Shaikh Gadai Kamboh
- Jamali Kamboh
