= Chandar Bhan Brahman =

Punjabi poet

Chandar Bhan Brahman, name also spelt as Chandra Bhan and Chandrabhan, was a Punjabi poet of the Persian language born in Lahore of the Mughal Empire.

== Biography ==
His date of birth is unknown; he probably died in the year 1662–63. (Note: This is the commonly assumed date. However, Rajeev Kinra cites a document in which Chandar Bhan was honoured at Shah Jahan's burial. This means he must have been alive in 1666. See Kinra, Rajeev (2015). Writing Self, Writing Empire: Chandar Bhan Brahman and the Cultural World of the Indo-Persian State Secretary. South Asia across the disciplines. Oakland, California: University of California Press. p. 58. ISBN 978-0-520-28646-7.) He belonged to a Brahman family, and chose "Brahman" as his pen name. His father Dharam Das was a government official in the Mughal service. Brahman served as a secretary (Munshi) to the Mughal emperor Shah Jahan (1628–1658).

As a poet, Chandar Bhan managed to write very complex metaphors in an otherwise very straightforward language. Chandar Bhan's pen-name "Brahman" allowed for ingenius wordplay because of the use of "idol" (Persian but, sanam) as a metaphor of the - human or Divine - beloved, and as the lover as "idol worshipper". By his time, the Persian Muslim lover calling himself an idol-worshipper with tongue in cheek (even when he/she meant the love of God) had become a cliché already, but Chandar Bhan added a new twist to it because it was also fact with him.

Brahman was influenced by and developed a strong respect for dervishes and yogis. Mughal emperor Shah Jahan was very impressed by Barahman's knowledge of Persian literature, calligraphy and Persian poetry. Brahman was appointed as court secretary and he was given responsibility for maintaining Shah Jahan's personal diary. He wrote a long essay in four chapters, the Chahar Chaman ("The Fourfold Flowerbed"), with chapter three containing his memoirs. Other topics are the daily routine of the emperor, the provinces of India, and philosophical ideas. He also edited a selection of his letters, the Munshi'at-i Barahman (Letters of Brahman), which contain letters to the royal family, to nobles (and some Sufis), to poets, letters of recommendation, and letters to his father.
