= Shaikh Inayat Allah Kamboh =

17th-century Mughal historian

- Born: 1608
- Died: 1671 (aged 62–63); Delhi
- Occupations: Scholar, writer, historian
- Years active: 17th century
- Notable work: Bahar-i-Danish
- Relatives: Muhammad Saleh Kamboh (brother)

Shaikh Inayat-Allah Kamboh (1608–1671) was a Punjabi Muslim scholar, writer and historian during the Mughal era.

He died in 1671 CE in Delhi, and his maqbara is located in Guband Kambohan wala on Empress Road near Railways Headquarters, Lahore.

== Early life and background ==
He was son of Mir Abdu-lla, Mushkin Kalam, whose title shows him to also have been a fine writer. Shaikh Inayat-Allah Kamboh was the elder brother and teacher of Muhammad Saleh Kamboh, the famous historian of Shah Jahan's court and the teacher of Mughal Emperor Aurangzeb.

== Career and works ==
Inayat-Allah Kamboh spent his early life in the military service of the Mughals and was a Mir Munshi (Inspector General) of Shah Jahan and held a mansab of 800 horses. After a period of service, he retired from the world and lived beside the sacred shrine of Qutb-ud-Din Bakhtiyar Kaki in Delhi. Like his brother Muhammad Saleh, Inayat-Allah is also stated to be an accomplished Hindi singer.

Inayat-Allah Kamboh wrote several historical works. He is most famous for his collection of tales entitled Bahar-i-Danish (Springtime of Knowledge), completed in 1651, which became one of the most popular textbooks of Persian. Muhammad Saleh Kamboh, younger brother of Inayat-Allah Kamboh, praised Bahar-i-Danish as a model of sophisticated workmanship. It became part of the syllabuses of Persian schools and is mentioned in a manuscript-copy of Khulasatul Makatib, written in 1688. From its popular use in Persian schools, educated men and women, both Muslims and Hindus, were commonly acquainted with it in Mughal India. During British rule too, according to education reports, it was taught in nearly all schools and its style and idiom were regarded as the best models of composition.

Another important work by Kamboh is the Takmilah-yi-Akbar-Namah, which serves as a continuation of Abu-al-Fazl's Akbar-Namah and narrates the last four years of emperor Akbar's reign. He also wrote two more books known as Dalkasha and Asharaf-al-Sarayaf.

== See also ==
- Shahbaz Khan Kamboh
- Jamali Kamboh
- Shaikh Gadai Kamboh
