= List of Punjabi Muslims =

Punjabi Muslims (Punjabi: پنجابی مسلمان ) are adherents of Islam who are linguistically, culturally or genealogically Punjabis. Primarily geographically native to the Punjab province of Pakistan today, many have ancestry in the entire Punjab region, split between India and Pakistan in the contemporary era.

== Artists ==
- Basharat Ullah (1801–1892)
- Allah Bakhsh (1895 – 1978)
- Abdur Rahman Chughtai (1894–1975)
- Ahmed Parvez (1926 – 1979)
- Bashir Mirza (1941 – 2000)
- Zubeida Agha (1922–1997)
- Rashid Rana (born 1968)
- Quddus Mirza (born 1961)

== Authors ==
=== Punjabi ===
==== Classical ====
- Fariduddin Ganjshakar (1188–1266)
- Shah Hussain (1539–1599)
- Naushah Ganj Bakhsh (1552–1654)
- Abdullah Lahori, (c. 1616–c. 1666)
- Sultan Bahu (1630–1691)
- Shah Sharaf (1640–1724)
- Afarin Lahori (c. 1660 – d. 1741)
- Hafiz Barkhurdar Ranjha (17th century)
- Waqif Lahori (1676– 1776)
- Bulleh Shah (1680–1757)
- Ali Haider (1690–1785)
- Lutf Ali (1716–1794)
- Waris Shah (1722–1798)
- Farad Faqir (1704/1720–1790)
- Hashim (1735/1752–1843)
- Ahmad Yar (1768–1845)
- Shah Mohammad (1780–1862)
- Qadir Yar (1802–1892)
- Fazal Shah Sayyad (1827–1890)
- Mian Muhammad Baksh (1830–1907)
- Khawaja Ghulam Fareed (1845–1901)

==== Modern ====
- Ghulam Rasool Alampuri (1849 – 1892)
- Meher Ali Shah (1859 – 1937)
- Imam Din Gujrati (1870–1954)
- Muhammad Iqbal (1877–1938)
- Hakim Ahmad Shuja (1893 – 1969)
- Faiz Ahmad Faiz (1911–1984)
- Ustad Daman (1911–1984)
- Saadat Hasan Manto (1912–1955)
- Shareef Kunjahi (1914 – 2007)
- Ahmad Rahi (1923 – 2002)
- Munir Niazi (1923–2006)
- Sharif Sabir (1928 – 2015)
- Habib Jalib (1928–1993)
- Shafi Aqeel (1930 – 2013)
- Shafqat Tanvir Mirza (1932 – 2012)
- Shahbaz Malik (1937–2024)
- Najam Hussain Syad (born 1935)
- Anwar Masood (born 1935)
- Afzal Ahsan Randhawa (1937 – 2017)
- Aizaz Ahmad Azar (1942 – 2015)
- Nasreen Anjum Bhatti (1943–2016)
- Fakhar Zaman (born 1943)
- Mazhar Tirmazi (born 1950)
- Ali Arshad Mir (1951–2008)
- Mir Tanha Yousafi (1955–2019)
- Shaista Nuzhat (born 1960)
- Khaqan Haider Ghazi (born 1965)

=== Urdu ===
- Fidvi Lahori (1729–1780)
- Mirza Hasan Qatil (1758–1818)
- Ibrahim Zaoq (1790–1854)
- Mufti Ghulam Sarwar Lahori (1837 – 1890)
- Zafar Ali Khan (1873 – 1956)
- Hafeez Jalandhari (1900–1982)
- Noon Meem Rashid (1910–1975)
- Faiz Ahmad Faiz (1911–1984)
- Saadat Hasan Manto (1912–1955)
- Majeed Amjad (1914 – 1974)
- Ahmad Nadeem Qasmi (1916–2006)
- Sahir Ludhianvi (1921–1980)
- Ashfaq Ahmed (1925 – 2004)
- Bano Qudsia (1928–2017)
- Habib Jalib (1928–1993)
- Muhammad Asif Khan (1929–2000)
- Zafar Iqbal (born 1930)
- Anwar Masood (born 1935)
- Amjad Islam Amjad (1944 – 2023)

=== Persian ===
- Shaikh Jamali Kamboh (1470 – 1536)
- Shaikh Gadai Kamboh (died 1574)
- Muhammad Saleh Kamboh (died 1675)
- Shaikh Inayat Allah Kamboh (1608–1671)
- Abu al-Barakat Munir Lahori (1610–1644)
- Shah Inayat Qadiri (1643 – 1728)
- Ghanimat Kunjahi (died 1695)
- Mita Chenabi (died 1698)

=== English ===
- Zulfikar Ghose (1935–2022)
- Tariq Ali (born 1943)
- Ahmed Rashid (born 1948)
- Alamgir Hashmi (born 1951)
- Mohammed Hanif (born 1964)
- Nadeem Aslam (born 1966)

=== Historians ===
- Ahmad Kamboh (fl. 1614)
- Abdul Hamid Lahori (died 1654)
- Nizam al-Din 'Ishrat Sialkoti (died 1773)
- Ahmad Shah Batalvi (19th-century)
- Bute Shah (died 1850)
- Mufti Ali-ud-Din (died c. 1856)
- Syad Muhammad Latif (1851–1902)
- Abdur Rahman (born 1934)

== Business ==
- Anwar Pervez, founder of Bestway
- Ashar Aziz, founder of FireEye in Silicon Valley
- Bashir Tahir, former CEO of Dhabi Group
- Fred Hassan, director at Warburg Pincus
- James Caan, founder of Hamilton Bradshaw
- Malik Riaz, founder of Bahria Town,
- Mansoor Ijaz, founder of Crescent Investment Management Ltd
- Mian Muhammad Latif, founder of Chenab Group
- Mian Muhammad Mansha, founder of Nishat Group
- Michael Chowdrey, founder of Atlas Air
- Muhammad Zahoor, owner of ISTIL Group
- Shahid Khan, owner of Flex-N-Gate, Jacksonville Jaguars and Fulham F.C
- Zameer Choudrey, CEO of Bestway

== Islamic scholars and other religious figures ==
- Sakhi Sarwar (1120 – 1181)
- Abu Tahir Multani (15th-century)
- Shaikh Bahlol Daryai (1515 – 1575)
- Ahmad Sirhindi (1564–1624)
- Abdul Hakim Sialkoti (1580–1656)
- Bari Imam (1617–1705)
- Sabir Shah (d. 1748)
- Jamaat Ali Shah (1834–1951)
- Maula Shah (1836–1944)
- Fazal Ali Qureshi (1853–1935)
- Meher Ali Shah (1859–1937)
- Sanaullah Amritsari (1868-1948)
- Muhammad Ibrahim Mir Sialkoti (1874–1956)
- Ziauddin Madani (1877–1981)
- Ghulam Mohiyuddin Gilani (1891–1974)
- Faiz-ul Hassan Shah (1911–1984)
- Karam Shah al-Azhari (1918–1998)
- Rashid Ahmed Ludhianvi (1922–2002)
- Israr Ahmed (1932–2010)
- Sajid Mir (born 1938)
- Ehsan Elahi Zaheer (1945–1987)
- Hafiz Saeed (born 1950)
- Tariq Jamil (born 1953)
- Khadim Hussain Rizvi (1966–2020)
- Saad Hussain Rizvi (born 1994)

== Military ==
=== Air Force ===
- Air Chief Marshal Tanvir Mahmood Ahmed
- Air Chief Marshal Zafar Chaudhry
- Air Chief Marshal Kaleem Saadat Rana
- Air Chief Marshal Rao Qamar Suleman
- Air Chief Marshal Zulfiqar Ali Khan
- Air Marshal Abdul Rahim Khan
- Air Marshal Nur Khan
- Pilot Officer Rashid Minhas, Nishan-e-Haider

=== Army ===
- General (R) Raheel Sharif, former Chief of Army Staff of the Pakistan Army
- General (R) Qamar Javed Bajwa, former Chief of Army Staff of the Pakistan Army
- General Zia ul Haq, former Chief of Army Staff and President of Pakistan
- General (R) Ashfaq Parvez Kayani, former Chief of Army Staff of the Pakistan army
- General (R) Tikka Khan, former COAS of the Pakistan Army and Victor of the Rann of Kutch
- General (R) Asif Nawaz Janjua, former Chief of Army Staff of the Pakistan Army
- General Asim Munir, current Chief of Army Staff of the Pakistan Army
- Lt Gen (R) Asim Saleem Bajwa
- Lt Gen (R) Abdul Ali Malik
- Lt Gen (R) Nasser Khan Janjua
- Lt Gen (R) Mahmud Ahmed
- Maj Gen (R) Rao Farman Ali
- Maj Gen (R) Muhammed Akbar Khan
- Maj Gen Iftikhar Janjua, most senior Pakistani officer killed in battle during Indo-Pakistani War of 1971 while fighting with his troops on the front line
- Maj Gen (R) Iftikhar Khan, first local Commander in Chief of the Pakistan Army
- Maj Gen (R) Muhammad Yusaf Khan
- Maj Gen (R) Raja Sakhi Daler Khan
- Maj Gen (R) Akhtar Hussain Malik
- Maj Gen (R) Ashraf Rashid
- Brig (R) Raja Habib ur Rahman Khan
- Brig (R) Amir Gulistan Janjua
- Major Tufail Muhammad, Nishan-e-Haider
- Major Raja Aziz Bhatti, Nishan-e-Haider
- Major Muhammad Akram, Nishan-e-Haider
- Major Shabbir Sharif, Nishan-e-Haider
- Captain Muhammad Sarwar, Nishan-e-Haider
- Naik Saif Ali Janjua, Nishan-e-Haider
- Lance Naik Muhammad Mahfuz, Nishan-e-Haider
- Sowar Muhammad Hussain, Nishan-e-Haider

=== Navy ===
- Admiral (R) Muhammad Asif Sandila
- Admiral (R) Muhammad Afzal Tahir

=== Recipients of the Victoria Cross ===
- Khudadad Khan
- Shahamad Khan
- Abdul Hafiz
- Sher Shah Awan
- Fazal Din

== Music ==
=== Punjabi Folk ===
- Alam Lohar
- Allah Ditta Loonay Wala
- Arif Lohar
- Inayat Hussain Bhatti
- Iqbal Bahu
- Khawaja Pervez
- Mansoor Malangi
- Musarrat Nazir
- Pathanay Khan
- Saieen Zahoor
- Samina Syed
- Shaukat Ali
- Shazia Manzoor
- Tahira Syed

=== Sufi Qawwali ===
- Fateh Ali Khan
- Nusrat Fateh Ali Khan
- Farrukh Fateh Ali Khan
- Rahat Fateh Ali Khan
- Badar Miandad
- Ghulam Farid Sabri
- Maqbool Ahmad Sabri
- Amjad Sabri

=== Classical Hindustani Gharanas ===
- Shaukat Hussain
- Ustad Tafu Khan
- Tari Khan
- Barkat Ali Khan
- Amanat Ali Khan
- Bade Fateh Ali Khan
- Ghulam Ali
- Hamid Ali Khan
- Asad Amanat Ali Khan
- Farida Khanum
- Salamat Ali Khan
- Sharafat Ali Khan
- Shafqat Ali Khan

=== Modern Playback ===
- Abdullah Qureshi
- Abrar-ul-Haq
- Aima Baig
- Ali Aftab Saeed
- Ali Azmat
- Ali Sethi
- Ali Zafar
- Annie Khalid
- Asrar Shah
- Atif Aslam
- Bilal Saeed
- Bohemia
- Faakhir Mehmood
- Fakhar-e-Alam
- Farhad Humayun
- Farhan Saeed
- Goher Mumtaz
- Hadiqa Kiani
- Haroon
- Humaira Arshad
- Humaira Channa
- Imran Khan
- Javed Bashir
- Jawad Ahmad
- Khursheed Bano
- Mahvash Waqar
- Masood Rana
- Meesha Shafi
- Mustafa Zahid
- Nabeel Shaukat Ali
- Naheed Akhtar
- Naseebo Lal
- Naseem Begum
- Noor Jehan
- Sahir Ali Bagga
- Salman Ahmad
- Sanam Saeed
- Sara Raza Khan
- Shamoon Ismail
- Shiraz Uppal
- Shuja Haider
- Tassawar Khanum
- Umair Jaswal
- Uzair Jaswal
- Waris Baig
- Zil-e-Huma
- Zubaida Khanum
- Zulfiqar Jabbar Khan

== Nobility ==
=== Mughal Empire ===
- Shahbaz Khan (1529–1599), governor
- Wazir Khan (1560–1642), grand vizier
- Daulat Khan (c. 1590–c. 1650), governor
- Sa'adullah Khan (1591–1656), Grand Vizier
- Hifzullah Khan (1645–1701), governor
- Mutawassil Khan (died 1744), governor
- Muzaffar Jang Hidayat (died 1751), Nizam of Hyderabad
- Khair Andesh Kamboh (died 1710), first Nawab of Meerut
- Adina Beg Arain (1710–1758), governor (and later Nawab) of Punjab.

=== Sikh Empire ===
- Shaikh Ghulam Muhy-ud-Din (died 1846), governor of Kashmir
- Shaikh Imam-ud-Din (1819–1859), governor of Kashmir
- Mian Ghousa (died 1814), artillery officer
- Fakir Azizuddin (1780–1845), diplomat and physician
- Fateh Khan Tiwana (died 1848), Tiwana chief
- Nathu Shah (died 1848), governor of Gilgit
- Ilahi Bakhsh (died 1849), artillery officer
- Sultan Mahmud Khan (died 1859), artillery officer

=== Chieftains ===
- Shaikha Khokhar (died 1398)
- Jasrat Khokhar (c. 1375–1442)
- Rai Bhoe Bhatti (c. 1380–1454)
- Rai Bular Bhatti (c. 1425–1518)
- Sarang Khan Gakhar (died 1546)
- Kamal Khan Gakhar (died 1566)
- Rai Sahra Langah (died 1469)
- Muqarrab Khan Gakhar (died 1765)
- Mahmud Khan Gujjar (died 1772), Nawab of Dera Ghazi Khan
- Nur Muhammad Chattha (died 1775)
- Pir Muhammad Chattha (died 1785)
- Inayatullah Khan Sial (died 1787)
- Ghulam Muhammad Chattha (died 1790)
- Ruhullah Khan Gujjar (died 1819)
- Rai Ahmad Khan Kharal (died 1857)
- Murad Fatyana (died 1869)

== Politicians ==
- Allama Muhammad Iqbal
- Khizar Hayat Tiwana
- Chaudhry Afzal Haq
- Chaudhry Amir Hussain
- Chaudhry Muhammad Ali
- Chaudhry Muhammad Sarwar Khan
- Chaudhry Pervaiz Elahi
- Chaudhry Shujaat Hussain
- Choudhary Rahmat Ali
- Fazal Ilahi Chaudhry
- Feroz Khan Noon
- Ghulam Bibi
- Hamza Shahbaz
- Hanif Ramay
- Khadim Hussain Rizvi
- Liaqat Abbas Bhatti
- Liaqat Ali Khan
- Malik Amjad Ali Noon
- Malik Anwer Ali Noon
- Ghulam Muhammad
- Malik Meraj Khalid
- Master Taj-uj-Din Ansari
- Mazhar Ali Azhar
- Mian Iftikharuddin
- Mian Muhammad Shahbaz Sharif
- Mian Umar Hayat
- Moeenuddin Ahmad Qureshi
- Muhammad Rafiq Tarar
- Muhammad Zia-ul-Haq
- Mushahid Hussain Syed
- Nawabzada Nasrullah Khan
- Nawaz Sharif
- Nisar Ali Khan
- Omer Sarfraz Cheema
- Rana Sanaullah Khan
- Rana Mashood Ahmad Khan
- Rana Muhammad Iqbal Khan
- Saad Hussain Rizvi
- Saqlain Anwar Sipra
- Sardar Ayaz Sadiq
- Shahbaz Sharif
- Shahid Hussain Bhatti
- Sheikh Hissam-ud-Din
- Sheikh Waqas Akram
- Syed Ata Ullah Shah Bukhari
- Syeda Sughra Imam
- Wasim Sajjad
- Waqar-ul-Mulk
- Fateh Khan Tiwana

=== United Kingdom ===
- Anas Sarwar
- Humza Yusuf
- Sajid Javid
- Sajjad Karim

== People believed to be Punjabi or of Punjabi origin ==
Following personalities have been identified by scholars to be Punjabi or of Punjabi origin, but there is yet to be a scholarly consensus:

- Ayn-Al Mulk Multani (d. 1325), general of Delhi Sultanate
- Muzaffar Shah I (1342–1411), founder of the Muzaffarid dynasty of Gujarat
- Khizr Khan (1351–1421), founder of the Sayyid dynasty
- Ustad Ahmad Lahori (c. 1580–1649), the chief architect of Taj Mahal
- Hussein Langah (d. 1502), Langah Sultan
- Hyder Ali (1720–1782), the Sultan of Mysore
- Sayyid Brothers, kingmaker and de-facto rulers of Mughal Empire

== Revolutionaries and freedom fighters ==
- Ahmed Khan Kharal - a rebel leader in West Punjab in the 1857 Rebellion
- Murad Fatyana - Freedom fighter
- Maulana Shah Abdul Qadir Ludhianvi - a rebel leader in East Punjab in the 1857 Rebellion
- Habib-ur-Rehman Ludhianvi - one of the founders of Majlis-e-Ahrar-e-Islam
- Inayatullah Khan Mashriqi - founder of Khaksar movement
- Ghulam Muhammad Thikriya- opponent to the British in the 19th century.
- Nizam Lohar, Blacksmith rebel against the British Indian Empire
- Malangi, Robinhood of Kasur in Colonial Punjab
- Mohammed Zaman Kiani, Patriot serviceman of the Azad Hind Fauj who organised battle against the British Empire and raids against the Dogra Ruler in the Kashmir Jihad
- Shah Nawaz Khan, A Commander of the Indian National Army tried for waging war against the King Emperor by the British Occupiers of India
- Habib Jalib, Pakistani left-wing revolutionary poet and anti-martial law activist

== Scientists and academics ==
- Abdus Salam, theoretical physicist and Nobel Prize winner in Physics for his contributions to the Electroweak force
- Riazuddin, theoretical physicist and one of the key developers of the theoretical designs of Pakistan's nuclear weapons
- Ayyub Ommaya, neurosurgeon and inventor of the Ommaya reservoir
- Mahbub ul Haq, economist and inventor of the Human Development Index (HDI)
- Asad Abidi, professor of electrical engineering at the University of California, Los Angeles (UCLA)
- Ziauddin Ahmad
- Masud Ahmed, theoretical physicist and one of the leading figures of the Theoretical Physics Group - the group that developed the theoretical designs of Pakistan's nuclear weapons
- Ishtiaq Ahmed, professor of political science at the Stockholm University
- Farooq Azam, professor of oceanography at the University of California, San Diego
- Rafi Muhammad Chaudhry, nuclear physicist and pioneer of Pakistan's nuclear weapons research program
- Nayyar Ali Dada, architect in modernist architecture
- Fayyazuddin, theoretical physicist
- Tasawar Hayat, mathematician
- Shahbaz Khan, hydrologist and director of the UNESCO cluster office in Jakarta
- Sultan Bashiruddin Mahmood, nuclear engineer
- Salim Mehmud, rocket scientist
- Atif Mian, professor of economics, public policy and finance at Princeton University
- Zia Mian, physicist and co-director of the program on science and global security at Princeton University
- Ghulam Murtaza, theoretical physicist
- Qaiser Mushtaq, mathematician
- Adil Najam, dean of global studies at Boston University
- Khalil Qureshi, physical chemist
- Muneer Ahmad Rashid, mathematical physicist

== Sportspersons ==
=== Association Football ===
- Masood Fakhri

=== Chess ===
- Sultan Khan

=== Cricket ===
- Aamer Malik
- Aamer Sohail
- Aaqib Javed
- Abdul Hafeez Kardar
- Abdul Qadir
- Abdul Razzaq
- Aizaz Cheema
- Asif Masood
- Ata-ur-Rehman
- Azeem Hafeez
- Azhar Mahmood
- Fazal Mahmood
- Ijaz Ahmed
- Imran Farhat
- Imran Nazir
- Imtiaz Ahmed
- Intikhab Alam
- Inzamam-ul-Haq
- Kamran Akmal
- Khan Mohammad
- Mahmood Hussain
- Majid Khan
- Maqsood Ahmed
- Mohammad Hafeez
- Mohammad Ilyas
- Mohammad Nazir
- Mohammad Wasim
- Mohammad Yousuf
- Mohammed Asif
- Moin Khan
- Mudassar Nazar
- Mushtaq Ahmed
- Pervez Sajjad
- Rameez Raja
- Rocky Khan
- Saeed Ahmed
- Saleem Altaf
- Saleem Elahi
- Saleem Malik
- Salman Butt
- Saqlain Mushtaq
- Sarfraz Nawaz
- Shabbir Ahmed
- Shoaib Akhtar
- Shoaib Malik
- Shujauddin
- Sohail Tanvir
- Tahir Naqqash
- Talat Ali
- Taufeeq Umar
- Waqar Hasan
- Waqar Younis
- Wasim Akram
- Wasim Raja
- Zaheer Abbas

=== Freestyle Wrestling ===
- Muhammad Inam
- Muhammad Bashir
- Zaman Anwar

=== Weightlifting ===
- Nooh Dastgir

=== Field hockey ===
- Abdul Rashid
- Asif Bajwa
- Hanif Khan
- Hasan Sardar
- Kalimullah
- Kamran Ashraf
- Manzoor Hussain
- Muhammad Shahbaz
- Shahbaz Ahmed
- Shahnaz Sheikh
- Sohail Abbas
- Wasim Feroz

Javelin throw

Arshad Nadeem

== See also ==
- Punjabi Muslims
- Ethnic groups in Pakistan
- List of Punjabi Muslim tribes
- Jat Muslim
