= Huma Safdar =

- ہما صفدر
- Born: Huma Safdar
- Occupations: Teacher, Theatre artist
- Known for: Punjabi language activist, actor, poet, writer, director of Punjabi feminist theatre “Sangat”

Huma Safdar (Urdu: ہما صفدر) is a teacher, theatre artist, Punjabi language activist and director of feminist theatre “Sangat”. As an artist, she has worked with Punjab Lok Rahs and worked to promote Punjabi theatre, literature and folklore. She has taught as art and Punjabi language teacher at the Lahore Grammar School.

== Early life and career ==
Safdar was born in a politically active family. Her father Safdar Rasheed and uncle Anwar Rasheed were members of the Mazdoor Kisan Party and along with them she learned about politics of the left and joined protests many times. Safdar’s husband, Akram Varraich is also a painter and poet who shares common concerns about society and establishing strong democratic tradition. Both are active members of Najm Hosain Syed's theatre group: “Sangat”. They have one son Rawal.

Safdar joined National College of Arts, Lahore in 1981 and graduated in Fine Arts with distinction. She is a painter by training. As a student, during the dictatorship era of Zia ul Haq (1984), she was politicised by witnessing repressed times for the Punjabi language, women, minorities and the under privileged working class. She turned into socialist feminist Punjabi theatre artist.

Safdar has worked as an arts teacher in the elite Lahore Grammar School for girls. As a language activist, Safdar's efforts worked in two ways: teacher of Punjabi language and Punjabi theatre for the students. She introduced the Punjabi language from Class five onwards as part of the curriculum in school where she taught. There is no Punjabi medium school in Punjab, although more than 50 percent Pakistanis speak Punjabi.

== Punjabi Feminist Theatre ==
Safdar is a big enthusiast of Punjabi language, Punjabi culture and Punjabi literature. Safdar joined Madeeha Gauhar's Ajoka Theatre group as an actor. Later, she formed her own group, Lok Rahs, committed to raising consciousness on social issues and rediscovering roots, traditions and folklore. As an artist, She worked with theatre Punjab Lok Rahs for a decade and a half to raise consciousness about class and women struggle for rights through traditional and Punjabi folklore.

As an art school teacher, Safdar has put her skills into staging fine Punjabi plays with high school girls. She gives intense two-month workshop for theatre performance to her students before the play is staged.

Safdar works as director of the feminist theatre “Sangat”. Sangat was started by Najm Hosain Syed and his wife Samina Syed in the form of holding a weekly gatherings to read, sing, interpret and discuss Punjabi Sufi poetry and that written by the Sikh Gurus. This sitting happens without a break for 40 years at the couple’s house in Lahore, Jail Road. It had since continued at various venues every week on Fridays. Sangat shies away from media attention and rather concentrates on promoting the philosophical and political context on the grassroot level. Still, its popularity has circulated through some of their live street performances. Safdar considers Najm Hosain Syed, the writer, as her mentor and her many productions like 'Heer Waris Shah', 'Sassi Punnu' and 'Ik Raat Ravi Di', are the plays written by Najm Syed.

Safdar has participated as panelist and directed plays to be performed in many art and literary festivals.

== Punjabi Literature ==
As a progressive, Safdar believes that the essence of Punjabi sufi literature is feminist. Punjabi literature became the basis of her theatre work, as it made ideological, political and social statements against established rules during the dictatorship era 1980s when she joined women’s movements. Through her theatre “Sangat”, Safdar has staged Punjabi literature as revolutionary act of awareness raising for common people’s issues. She has staged classic Punjabi texts such as Heer Damodar, Mirza Saheban, Heer Waris Shah, ‘Alfo Pairni di Vaar’ (a six-hour stage play) and many classic and modern Punjabi texts including poetry presentations. She encouraged women participation in theatre performance and chose diverse venues to perform, from small towns to big cities, from girls’ schools and women colleges to the shrines of Sufi saints.

She has written many books on Punajbi poetry. Safdar as peace activist visited India many times both as an artist and an activist.

== Major plays ==
Safdar has directed following plays:

“Avaeen Nahi Oo Gal”

“Jogi hoeeke aa”

“Naang Val”

“Heer Ranjha"

“Waris mian lookan kamliyan noun qisa joar hushyar sunaya hi”

“Birah tu Sultan”

“Chipen Ton Pehlan”

“Chog Kasumbe Di”, based on poetry about struggle of labour class in society. The play is based on Bulleh Shah’s poem “Kafee”, in which seven female characters act as hardworking farm-women, picking up flowers from fields but the gains went into the pocket of businessmen, who dominated the poor and needy.

"Rajni"

“Ik Raat Ravi Di”

“Ani Channi Di Tikki”

“Nukar Natak” is based on Bulleh Shah’s "kafi buss kar ji, bass kar ji, gal Asa anal hass kar gi". “Diwa Mundri”, has been written by Najm Hussain, the play is a critique of the capitalist system of economic production. “Qaidna Di Waar“ is about country’s countless women activists who faced hardships and jail terms but continued their mission for a progressive society.
