= Afzal Tauseef =

Pakistani writer and journalist (1936–2014)

Professor Afzal Tauseef
- ਅਫਜ਼ਲ ਤੌਸੀਫ; افضل توصیف
- Born: 18 May 1936; Simbli, Hoshiarpur, East Punjab
- Died: 30 December 2014 (aged 78); Lahore, Pakistan
- Resting place: Karim Block cemetery, Iqbal Town, Lahore
- Citizenship: Pakistani
- Education: English studies MA
- Alma mater: Oriental College, Lahore Government College University
- Occupations: Writer, Columnist
- Writing career
- Language: Punjabi, Urdu
- Years active: 19xx–2014
- Period: Ayub Khan regime Operation Fair Play
- Subjects: Politics, social, language arts
- Notable awards: Pride of Performance (2010)

Afzal Tauseef (18 May 1936 – 30 December 2014), also spelled Afzal Tausif, was a Pakistani Punjabi language writer, columnist and journalist.

She criticized military dictatorship in Pakistan and was detained, later displaced several times by the military dictators of that time, such as Ayub Khan and Muhammad Zia-ul-Haq. Afzal has authored more than thirty books in Punjabi and Urdu. In 2010, she was awarded the Pride of Performance by the Government of Pakistan in recognition of her literary contributions. She was also associated with the Pakistan Peoples Party and served as vice president of Punjabi Adabi Board (PAB) for five years. Afzal also wrote a book titled Dekhi Teri Duniya (lit. 'Seen your world').

== Early life ==
Afzal was born on 18 May 1936, in East Punjab at Simbli village of Hoshiarpur, British India. She was the eldest child of her parents and had two younger brothers. They migrated to Pakistan in 1947 along with their father who was then posted as a police officer after the country was declared a sovereign state. Afzal initially stayed in Balochistan. She did her initial schooling, including matriculation from a government girls school at Quetta, and later moved to Punjab where she attended Oriental College but left midway. Afzal then attended Government College University, Lahore and did a master's degree in English. After completing higher education, she was then appointed as a teacher at the University of Home Economics (formerly a college). Later, she taught English at College of Education until her retirement.

== Literary career ==
Afzal wrote books and editorial columns. She wrote for newspapers and published thirty books on themes such as politics, social issues, and art and languages.

Her books include:

- Punjab Ke'da Naa Punjab (what is Punjab)
- Tahli Mere Bachray (My kids, O Sheesham tree)
- Panjjeevãn Ghanta (the 25th hour)
- Vailay De Pichay Pichay (Following the past)
- Amman Vailay Millan Gay (we will meet in the time of peace)
- Lahu BhijjiaN BatkhaaN (Blood-soaked Ducks)

Some of her books were later transliterated into Gurmukhi and published in India. She wrote a book on the fall of Bangladesh and Baloch cause, leading her to face military trials and detentions. My Beloved Trees, My Children was among the books she wrote about partition. Afzal's main subject was progressive writing.

== Awards and recognition ==
During her lifetime, Afzal Tauseef received numerous awards for her literary works:

- Lifetime Achievement Award by Asian Writers Association, a Denmark-based nonprofit organization
- Pakistani military dictators, including General Zia Ul-Haq, offered her the Pride of Performance award several times with a tract of farmland as a prize, but she refused until 2010, when she accepted the award.

== Death and legacy ==
She died in Lahore on 30 December 2014, a day after being admitted to Alshafi Hospital. She is buried in Karim block cemetery in Iqbal Town. Her funeral was attended by Punjabi Adabi Board members and representatives of the Pakistan Academy of Letters including writers Kanwal Feroze, Parveen Malik, Baba Najmi and journalists.

A fellow Indian progressive writer, Amrita Pritam had compiled a book about her in Hindi entitled Doosre Aadam Ki Beti and also called her "Suchi Dhee Punjab Di" (True daughter of the Punjab).
