= Nizam al-Din 'Ishrat Sialkoti =

18th-century poet and historian from Sialkot

Nizam al-Din 'Ishrat Sialkoti was an 18th-century historian, judge, panegyrist, and a court poet of Ahmad Shah Durrani, from Sialkot, Punjab. He is best known for his Shāhnāma-yi Aḥmadiyya, a versified history of the reign of Ahmad Shah Durrani imitating Ferdowsi's Shāhnāma, completed in around 1772/1773.

As his nisbah indicates, Sialkoti hailed from the city of Sialkot. Prior to the reign of Ahmad Shah, Sialkoti was commissioned (possibly by Nader Shah himself) to write Shāhnāma-i Nādirī or Nādirnāma, a poetic narration of the era of Nader Shah, presumably during his invasion in 1738–9. It was completed in 1749. During Ahmad Shah's invasion in 1756–7, he came from Sialkot and accompanied the Durrani shah after his return from Delhi till Kabul. Ahmad Shah, apparently impressed by his poetic talent, commissioned Sialkoti for a work for himself. Under Shah's orders material was supplied to Sialkoti by the official historiographer Mīrzā Maḥmūd, with which he retired to Sialkot.

In 1762 Sialkoti accompanied Nūr al-Dīn Khān Bāmīzay, the Afghan governor, to Kashmir Valley where he became a judicial officer. Sialkoti completed his Shāhnāma-yi Aḥmadiyya, a masnavi of 614 pages, in the valley in 1772/3, concluding it with the death of Ahmad Shah and the accession of Timur Shah Durrani. Sialkoti wrote another epic poem detailing campaigns of Ahmad Shah in Hindustan as well. The later biographical details of Sialkoti are unknown.

In his works Sialkoti refers to himself with the exalted titles of “pride of Punjab” (fakhr-i Panjāb) and “honored of India” (iʿzāz-i Hind). His masnavi is notable for containing correspondence of Ahmad Shah with Qianlong Emperor of Qing China and Sultan Mustafa III of Ottoman Empire.

== See also ==
- Waqif Lahori
- Mirza Hasan Qatil
- Tarikh-i Ahmad Shahi
