= Muhammad Asif Khan (disambiguation) =

Muhammad Asif Khan is a Pakistani geologist.

Muhammad Asif Khan may also refer to:

- Muhammad Asif Khan (Pakistani politician)
- Muhammad Asif Khan (writer)
