= Mansoor Malangi =

Pakistani Punjabi folk singer (1947–2014)

Ustad Mansoor Malangi
- Born: 1 January 1947; Garh More
- Origin: Jhang
- Died: 10 December 2014 (aged 67) Garh More
- Cause of death: Heart attack
- Genres: Folk music and ghazal singer
- Occupations: Singer, song writer
- Years active: 1965 – 2014
- Award: Tamgha-i-Imtiaz (Medal of Excellence) award by the Government of Pakistan in 2012

Mansoor Malangi (Shahmukhi:منصور ملنگی) was a Punjabi folk singer from Pakistan. He is widely regarded as "King of Punjabi-folk" across Pakistan.

== Early life ==
Malangi was born in Garh More village of Jhang district, Punjab. His father Pathan Ali was a sarangi player so Malangi inherited this musical talent from his father. He started singing at a young age and rose to fame with his song Ik Phul Motiye da in 1974.

== Career ==
He released over 200 studio albums. Besides his greatest hits like "Ik phull motiye da" and "Keri ghalti hoi aye zalim", he released other successful hits like "Balocha zalman" and "Mahi diyan nazan ton main lakh lakh var han".

He also sang Sufi poetry of Khawja Ghulam Farid, which included ‘Akh Phurkandi aey’, ‘Guzar Gaya Din Sara’, ‘Ronday Urmr Nibhai’, and ‘Wich Rohi De’.

== Legacy ==
"Sadly, he was misconstrued as a Saraiki singer whereas he was more like a minstrel of Punjab, a unique voice from Jhang, the land of Heer"

— Soofi Mushtak, in an Interview

"He was the only Punjabi folk singer to have made the Punjabi dohra (quatrain) popular with a touch of humour, freshness and originality to the Punjabi mahiya (couplet)"

— Professor Sada Hussain, in an interview with Dawn

== Awards and recognition ==
- Tamgha-i-Imtiaz (Medal of Excellence) award by the Government of Pakistan in 2012.

== Death ==
He died of a heart attack in Garh More and is buried there.
