= Waqif Lahori =

18th-century Punjabi and Persian poet (died 1776)

Sheikh Nūr-ul-‘Ain Waqīf Lāhōri (Persian and Punjabi: شیخ نورالعین واقف لاہوری), also known as Waqif Batalvi (died 1776), was an 18th-century Punjabi and Persian-language poet and author.

== Biography ==
Born in Batala, Punjab, his father Qazi Amanatullah was the chief qazi of Batala. His date of birth is not given in any of his biographical sources. His family was apparently well-to-do: he was described as among the nobles of Punjab by his contemporary Siraj-ud-Din Arzu.

Waqif was a contemporary of Siraj-ud-Din Arzu, Azad Bilgrami, Faqirullah Afarin, and Abdul Hakīm Hākim Lahori, and except Arzu, had deep relations with all of them. In 1760 (1174 hijri) he went to Deccan with Abdul Hakim where he met Azad at Aurangabad. After a short stay both travelled to Surat, from where Abdul Hakim went on a pilgrimage to Mecca. Waqif stayed there until Abdul Hakim returned and both again went to Deccan, where Waqif lived in Hyderabad for a while. He returned to Punjab next year, reaching Batala in 1176 hijri (1762/1763). Owing to the anarchy prevailing in Punjab at the time, Waqif later settled in Bahawalpur. He died in 1776.

== Poetry ==
Waqif was his pen name. He was not connected to any royal court, although Ahmad Durrani who, according to Ganda Singh, greatly admired his poetry, had invited him to his court at Kandahar, where he was welcomed and entertained as a state guest. He was praised and given the title of Shamsuddin-i-Punjab by Abdul Hakim Lahori for his poetic talents.

An autographed copy of Waqif's Divan was discovered in 1962 among the manuscripts from the imperial library of maharaja Ranjit Singh. In the same year Punjabi Adabi Board published his Persian Divan with the aid of six of its manuscripts. A collection of his poems was translated and published by Afzal Ahmed Syed in 2020.

== See also ==
- Nizam al-Din 'Ishrat Sialkoti
- Mirza Hasan Qatil
