= Purkhu =

Pahari artist

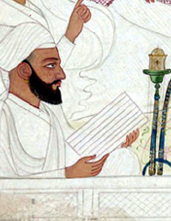
- Presumed self-portrait of Purkhu from a larger work
- Style: Pahari (specifically Kangra) and Sikh
- Patrons: Sansar Chand of Kangra State; Ranjit Singh of Lahore State

Purkhu (fl. 1780–1820), also spelt as Purkhoo or Parkhu, and also known as Purkhu of Kangra, was a Pahari painter who specialized in the Kangra-style. He painted both courtly and religious themes.

== Biography and works ==
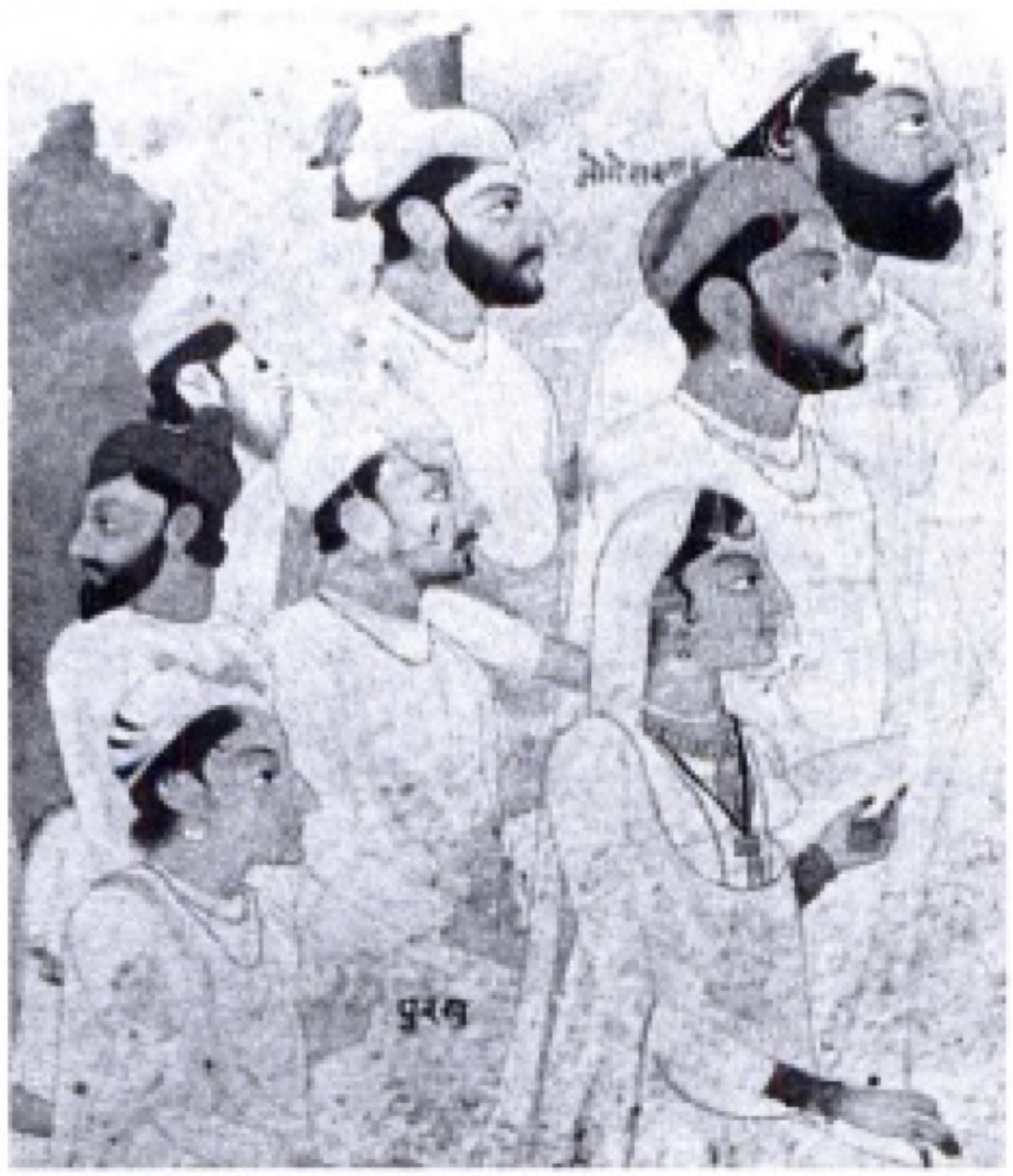
Detail of several figures from a painting of Maharaja Sansar Chand's court, with one of the figures identified by an inscription as depicting the artist Purkhu.

Purkhu was the son of Dhummun. Purkhu was likely the head chitrera (artist) of a courtly atelier based out of Kangra State during the reign of Sansar Chand (r. 1775–1823). In his works, he documented both the public and private lives of his patron.

Purkhu also produced a series of religious art works based upon the Harivamsa, Shiva Purana, Ramayana, Gita Govinda, and Kedara Kalpa.

Purkhu's disciple was Basharat Ullah.

== Style ==
When comparing the works of earlier Pahari artists belonging to the first generation after Nainsukh and Manaku, which are characterized as "dreamlike" and "lyrical", Purkhu's on the other hand are "journalistic". In Purkhu's works, individual facial features depicted do not seem individual, however closer examination reveals subtle differences. The landscapes in his paintings have been described as "more mannered" when compared to the earlier Pahari artists.

== Legacy ==
Some of Purkhu's paintings were exhibited at the Lahore Exhibition of 1864, where they were praised for their "remarkable clearness of tone and delicacy of handling" and got a special mention in the Jury's Report on Fine Art items.

== Gallery ==
=== Kangra ===
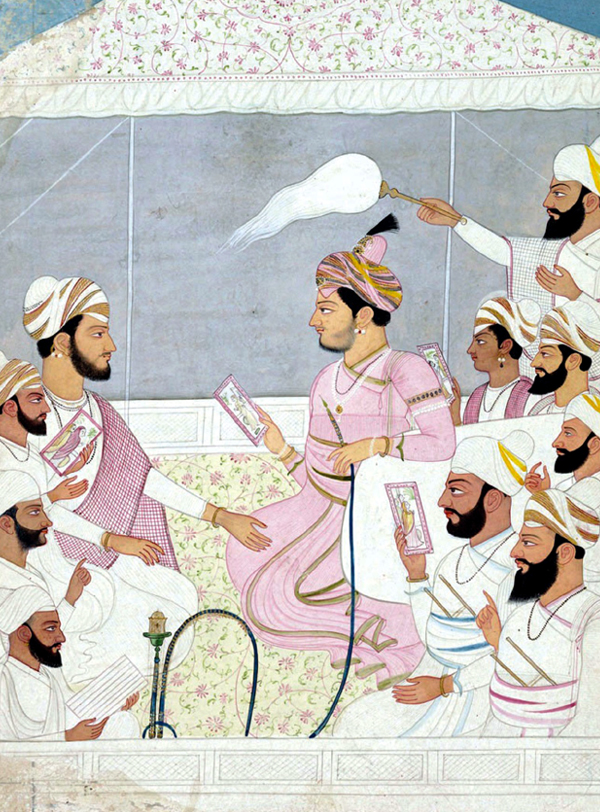
Detail of 'Maharaja Sansar Chand of Kangra Enjoys Paintings with His Courtiers' by Purkhu of Kangra, ca.1785–90

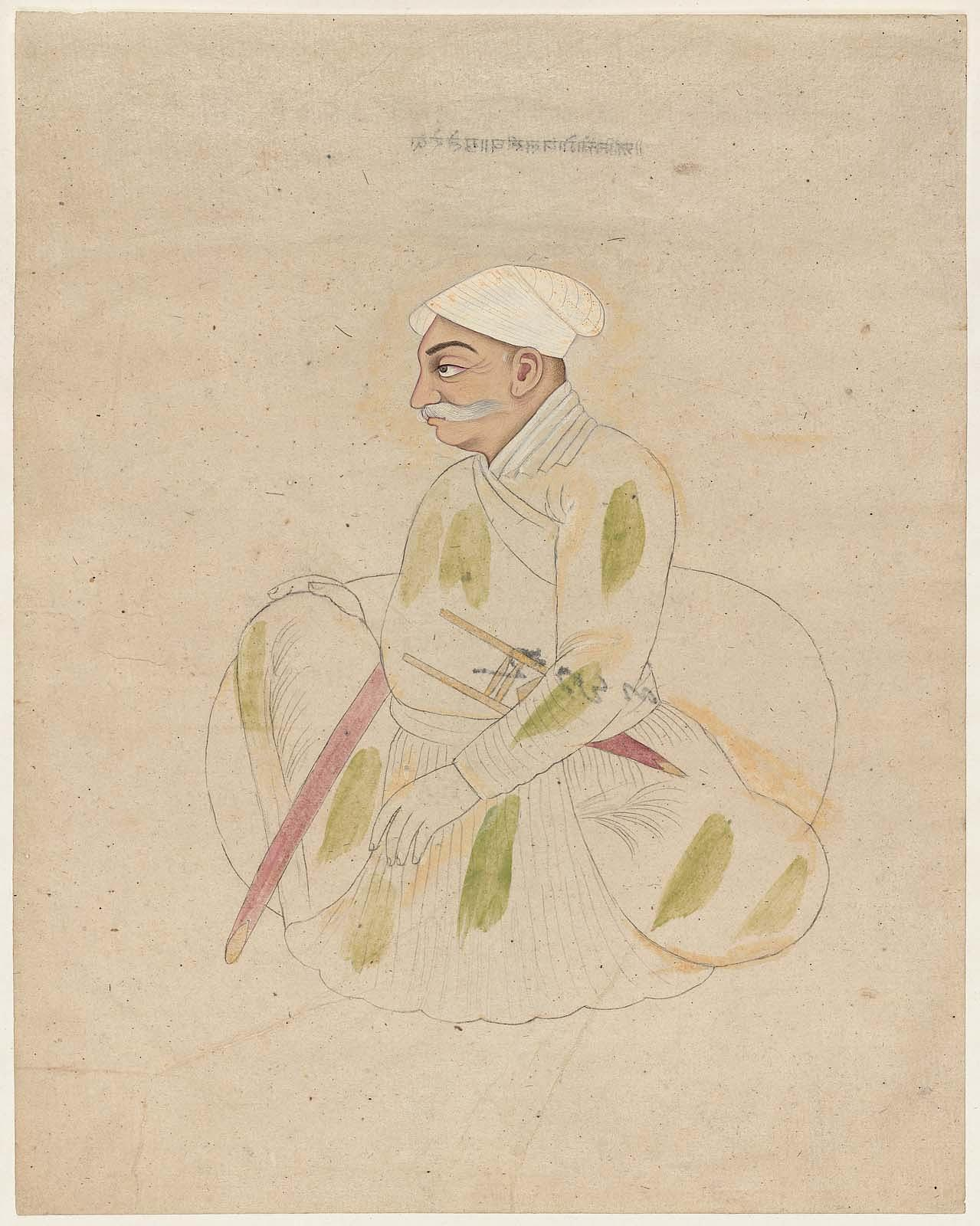
Ancestor painting of Mian Gopal of Guler seated whilst leaning against a bolster by Purkhu, ca.1825

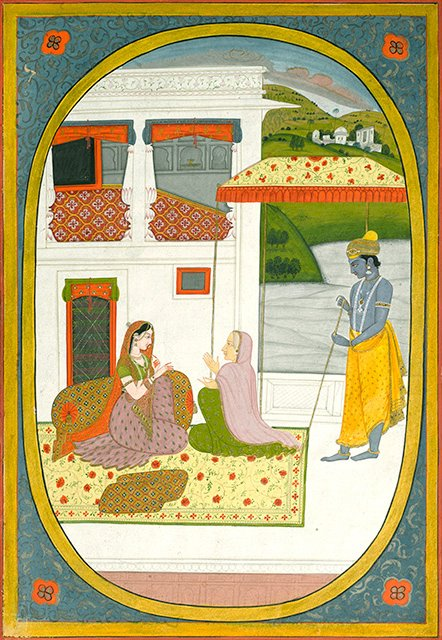
Folio 48 from the Kangra Rasikapriya, school of Purkhu, Kangra, c 1810

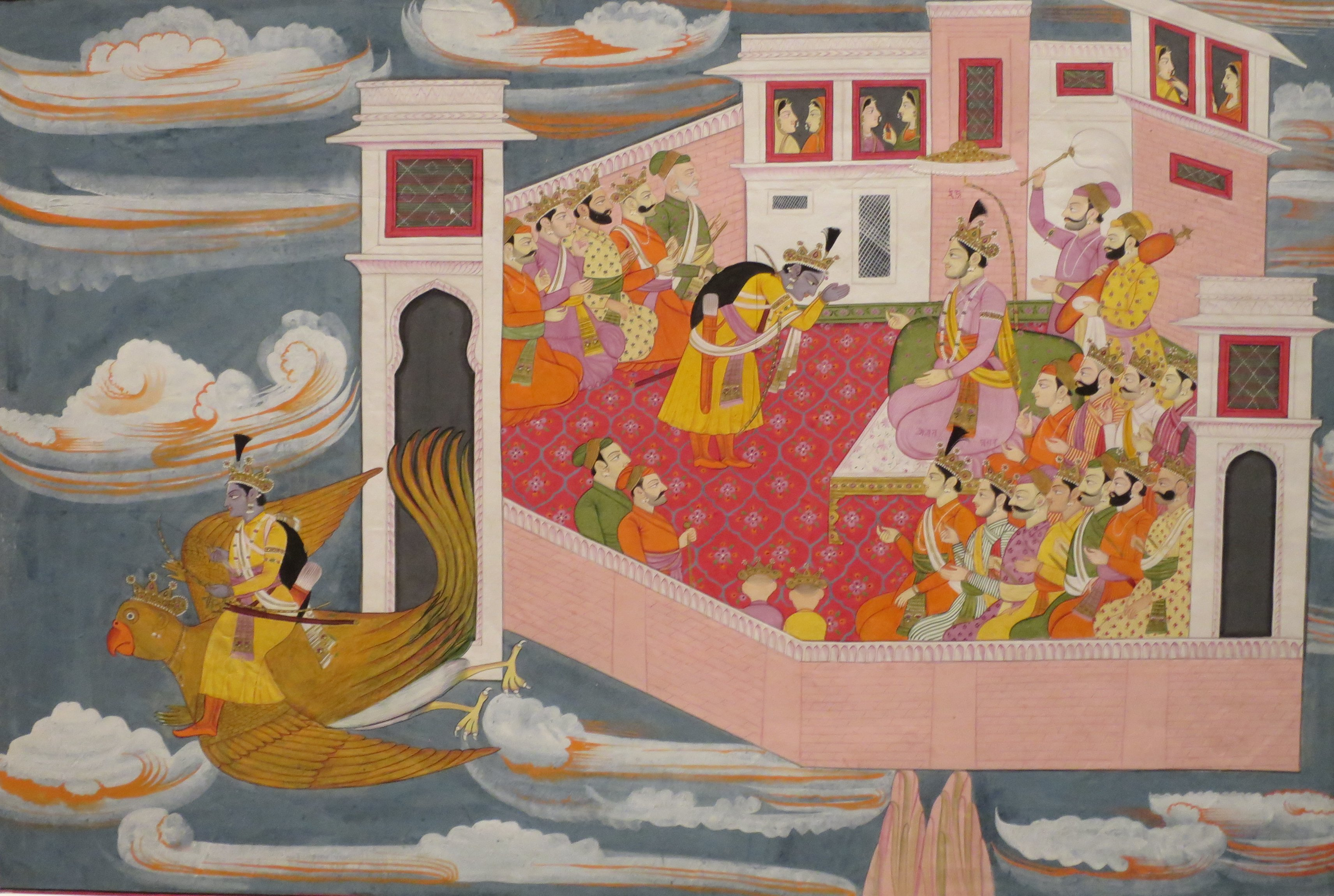
Krishna Approaches Indra for Help, workshop of Purkhu, Honolulu Museum of Art

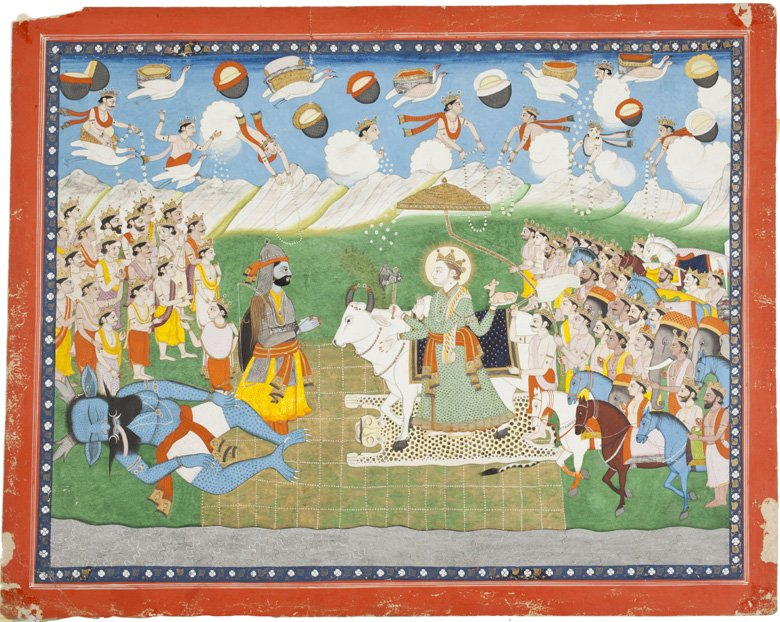
Illustration to a Mahabharata series, In the manner of Purkhu, Kangra, circa 1815-20

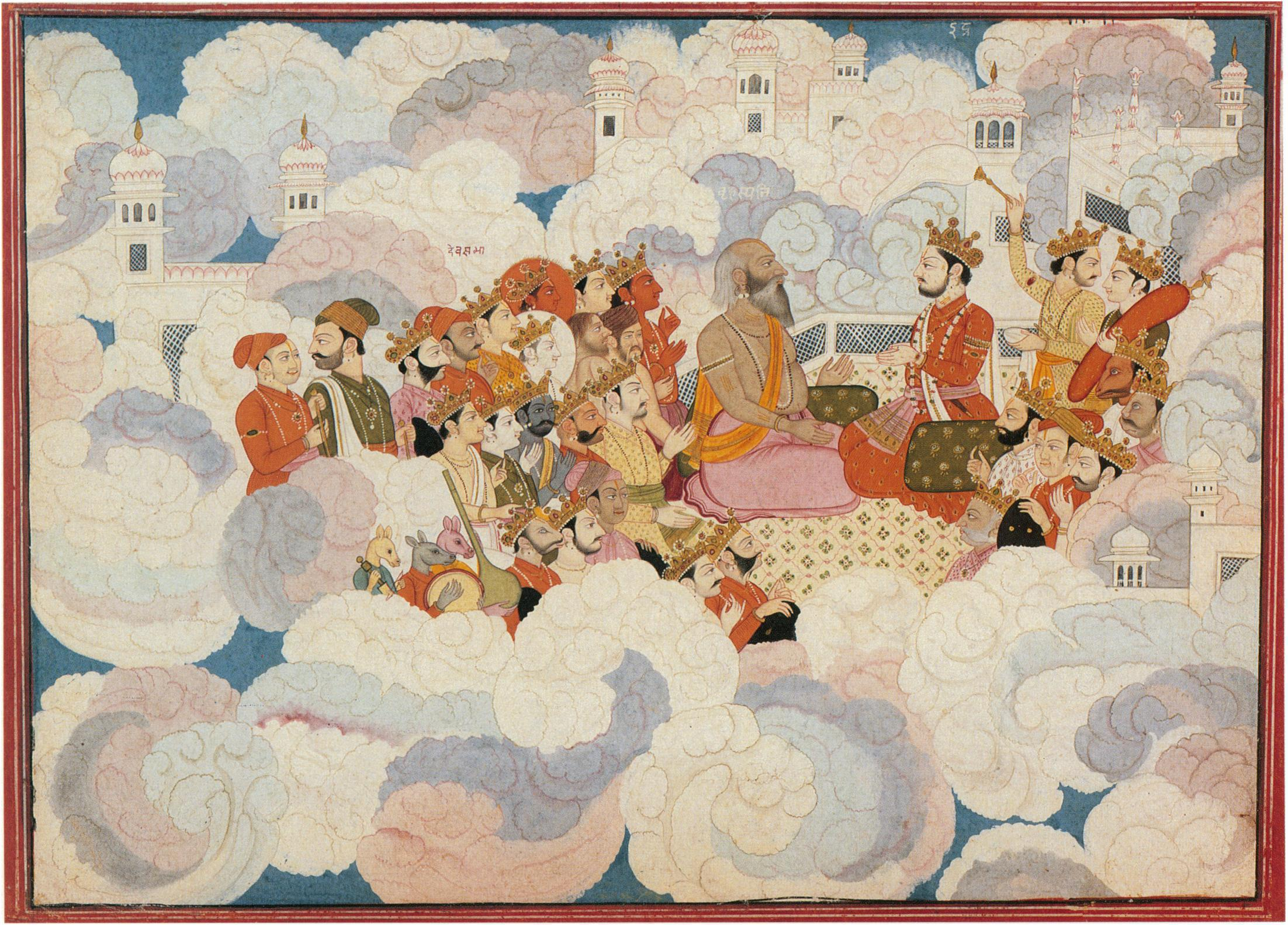
Indra consulting with his Preceptor in the Assembly of the Gods

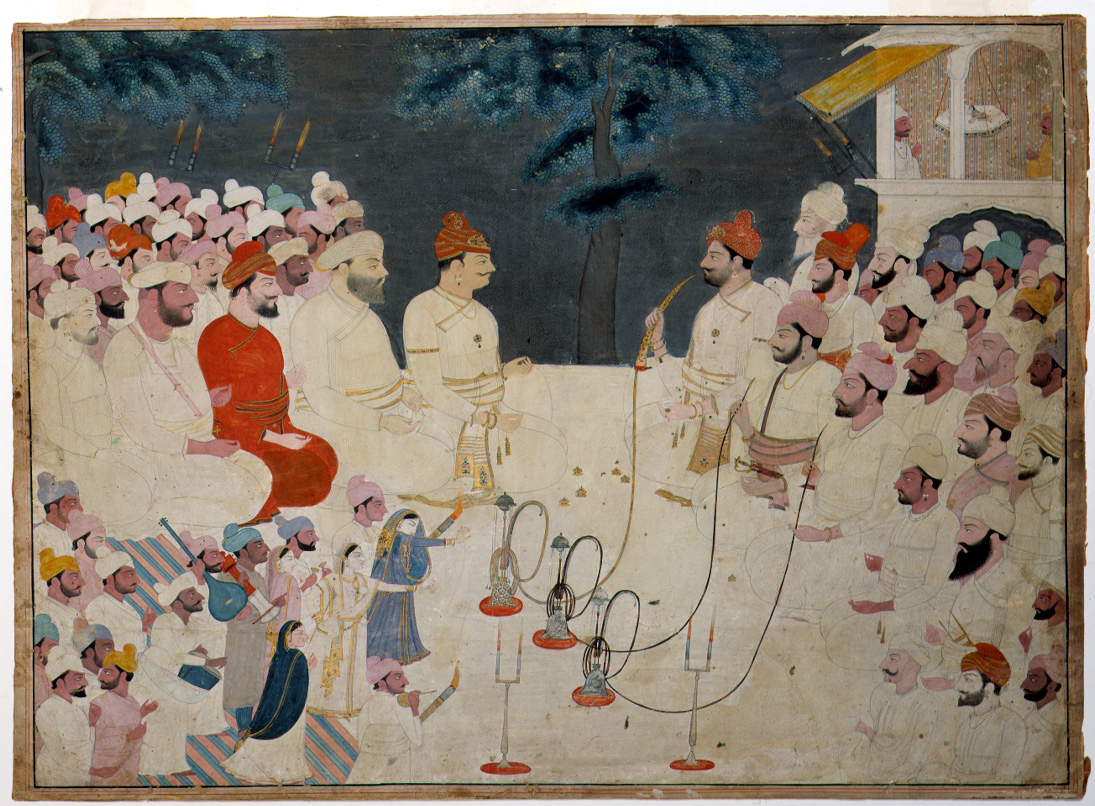
Maharaja Sansar Chand receives some visitors

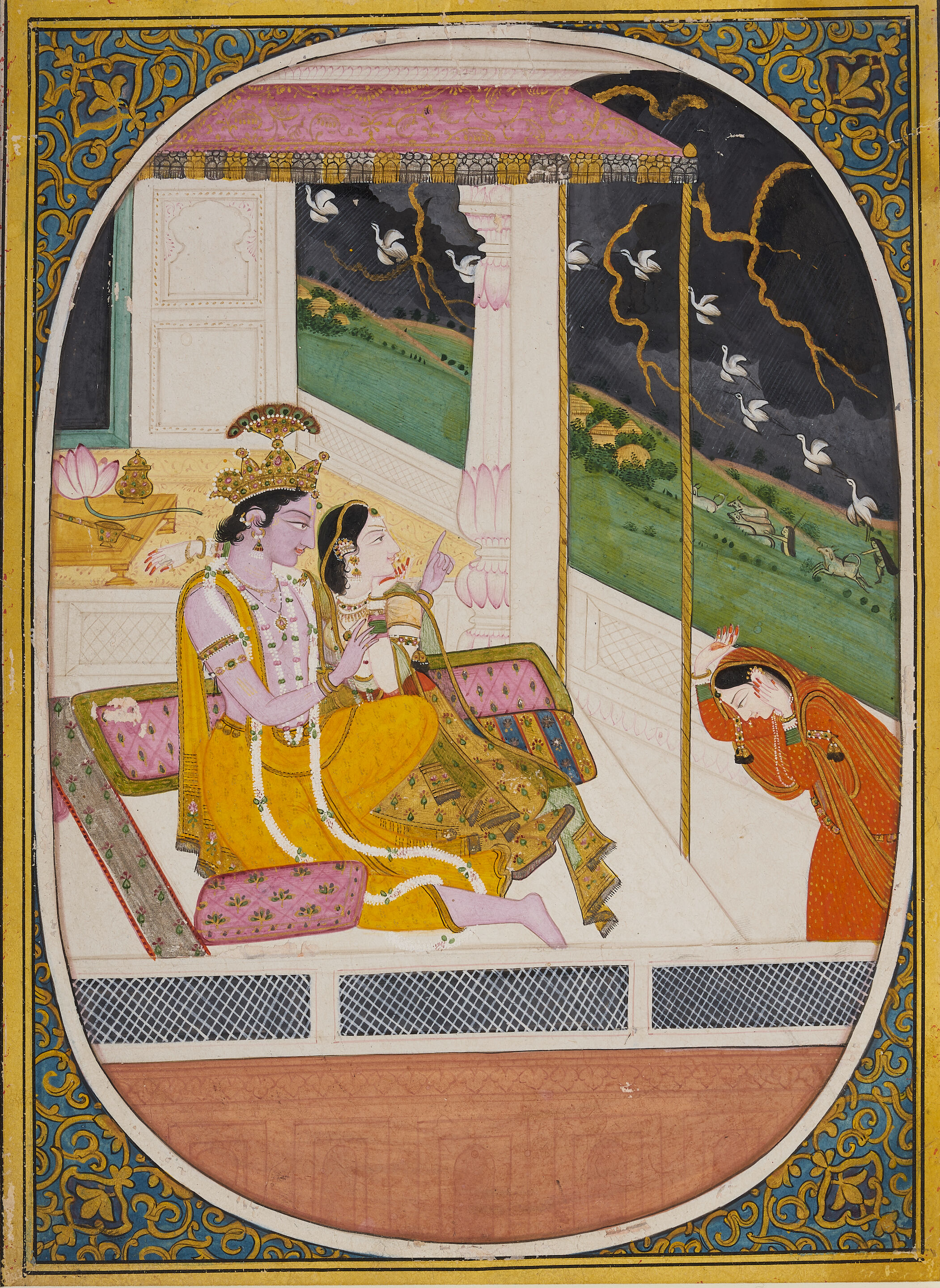
Radha and Krishna watching a storm, c 1810-20

=== Sikh ===
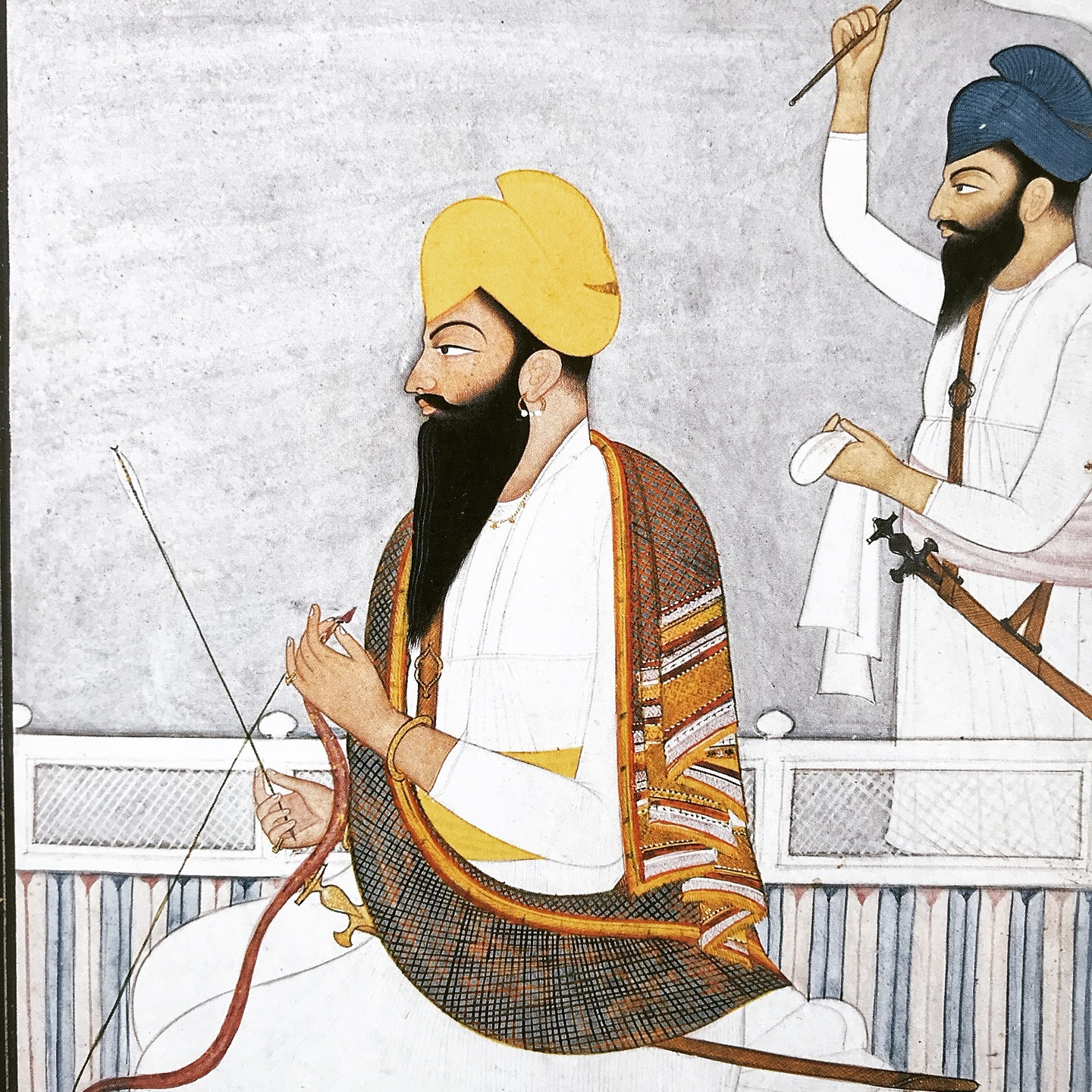
Miniature painting of Gurbaksh Singh Kanhaiya with a fly-whisk attendant. Family atelier of Purkhu of Kangra, ca.1785

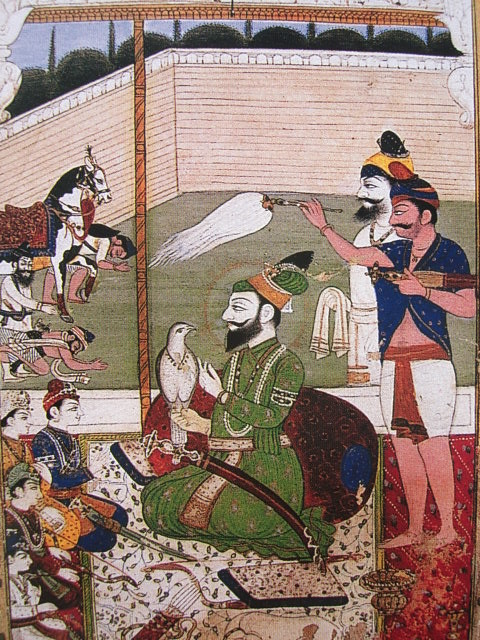
Guru Gobind Singh with the Sahibzadas

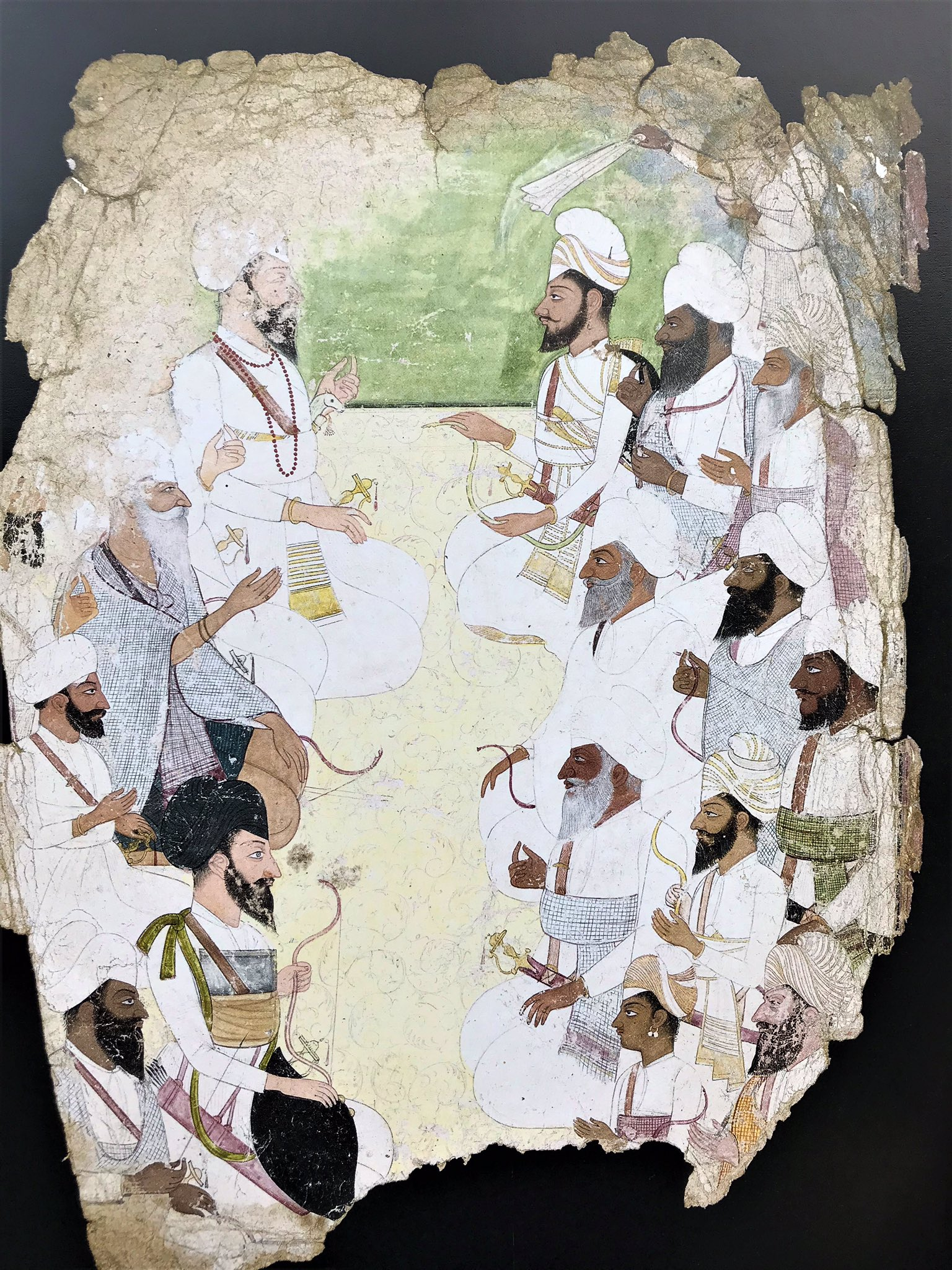
Ramgarhia and Sukarchakia Misls hold a diplomatic meeting

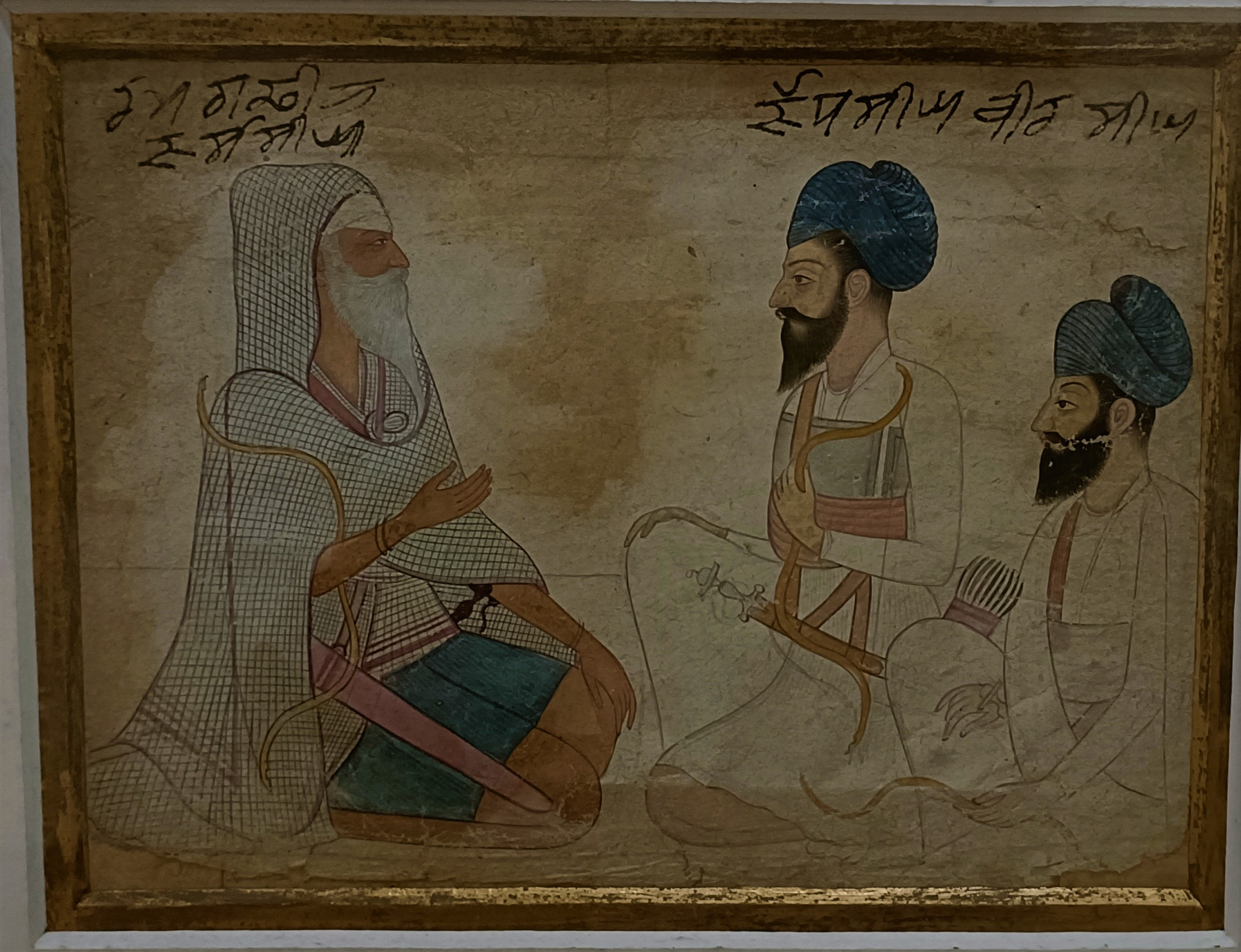
Sardar Jassa Singh Ramgarhia in conversation with Jodh Singh and Bir Singh

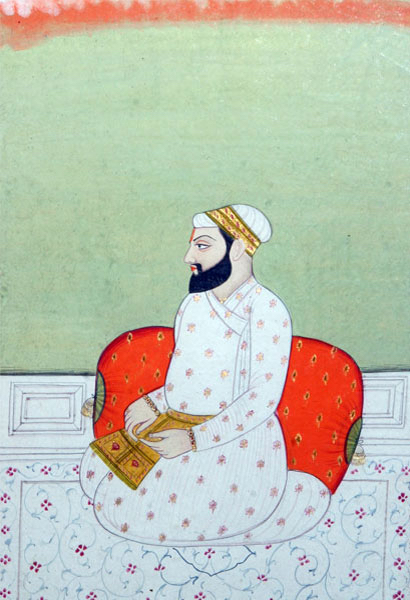
Portrait of Guru Arjan Dev, the Fifth Guru

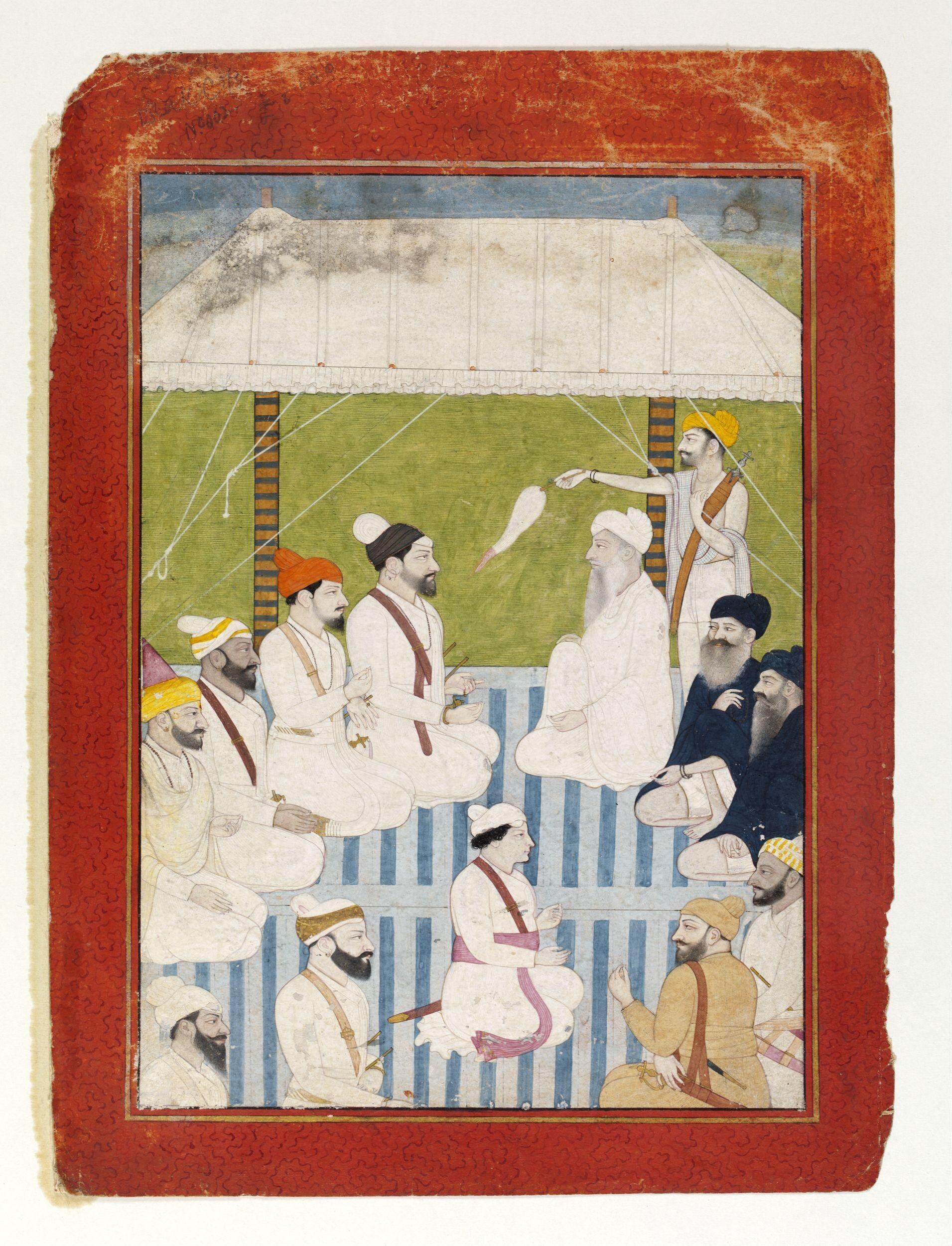
Painting of Jai Singh Kanhaiya receiving Raja Raj Singh and other hill princes with canopy overhead, ca.1774
