= Tarikh-i Ahmad Shahi =

Chronicle on the reign of Ahmad Shah Durrani

The Tarikh-i Ahmad Shahi (Persian: تاریخ احمد شاهی) is a chronicle, written in Persian, by Mahmud al-Husayni. He had been hired by Ahmad Shah Durrani to mark the achievements of his rule. The Tarikh-i Ahmad Shahi was written during and encompassed the entire reign of Ahmad Shah. It was more than merely an accessible glimpse into Afsharid historiography, it illustrated Persian historiography through the use of dramaturgy that combined prose, rhymed prose, and poetry.

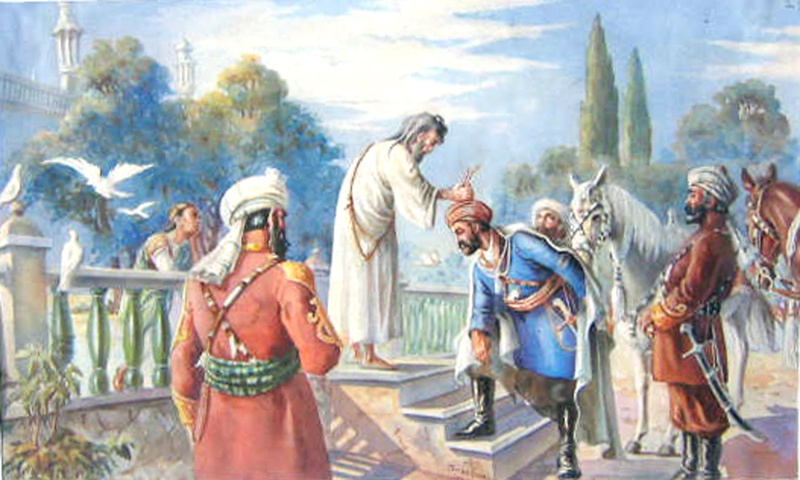
Coronation of Ahmad Shah Durr-i-Durrān by Abdali chiefs at Kandahar in 1747

== Background ==
Durrani chroniclers followed an established literary convention, according to a long-standing custom that attained its zenith in Iran and India between the 13th and 15th centuries by selecting the Persian language as their medium. The Uzbek conquest of Central Asia in the early 16th century is credited for making Persian the primary historical language in the region. Therefore, a fixed repertoire of codes, images, and narrative rhythms was provided by the wide literary lineages that allowed the works to be analyzed. Writing history involved more than just capturing the facts; the writers also aimed to amuse their audience and showcase their artistic talents.

== Instructions ==
Ahmad Shah ordered that his reign be documented so that it could be used as a model for governing rulers in the future. Ahmad gave the order for Muhammad Taqi Khan Shirazi, a former Afsharid official, to send a scribe with the skill to match Nadir Shah's chronicler Mirza Mahdi Astarabadi, especially his most important work, the Tarikh-i Nadiri. Hired c.1754, Mahmud al-Husayni was instructed to write out Ahmad Shah's reign's events in plain, unadorned terms.

== Composition ==
Mahmud al-Husayni closes the introduction with a consideration of his sources, his function as a historian, and potential objections from his audience, in keeping with the conventions of the historiography of the period. Although Ahmad Shah's career is credited by proponents of modern nationalism with laying the groundwork for modern-day Afghanistan, this phrase is obviously a creation of later times and is not contained in Tarikh-i Ahmad Shahi.

Al-Husayni utilizes the honorific of "Pearl of Pearls" to introduce Ahmad Shah as a member of the Saduza'i family of the Durrani tribe and emphasizes the role of Ahmad's fellow tribesmen as the new elite that supports the state. He begins the historical account by linking the events of Nadir Shah's reign to the ascent of Ahmad Shah in the future. Al-Husayni highlights the larger Durrani group's deportation from Herat to Nishapur as well as the military services they subsequently provided to Nadir Shah. He creates a linear progression from the Durranis' integration into Nadir Shah's army to their rise to prominence as an imperial elite, the Afsharid warriors.

Al-Husayni's chronicle is structured around accepted historiographic conventions, while describing successive battle scenes. He highlights the meeting between Ahmad Shah and Hajji Bi Khan Ming, stating it occurred in the years 1750–1. (Note: Lee indicates this was overstated by British diplomats in the following century.) The Tarikh gives insight into the life of Hajji Bi Khan Ming while accusing him of rapacity, cruelty and oppression. He spends the rest of the story detailing Ahmad Shah's military campaigns in chronological order. The regularity of these campaigns indicated a pattern of movement that is essential for obtaining resources and rekindling allegiances. Ahmad Shah concentrated his military efforts on the prosperous eastern territories. He conducted nine journeys to northern India between 1747 and 1767, two of which are considered military achievements: the capture of Delhi in 1757 and the defeat of the Marathas at Panipat in 1174–1761.

The Tarikh-i Ahmad Shahi traces the life and deeds of Ahmad Shah Durrani, with most of the manuscript devoted to events that occurred after 1747. Rather than being a history of a particular region, it was a biography of Ahmad Shah. Ahmad Shah's reign is covered in varied lengths of folios by Al-Husayni. For instance, although four and five folios cover the second and seventh years, thirty-nine and forty folios deal with the first and fourth years, respectively.

== Sources ==
- Noelle-Karimi, Christine (2016). "Afghan Polities and the Indo-Persian Literary Realm: The Durrani Rulers and Their Portrayal in Eighteenth-Century Historiography". In Green, Nile (ed.). Afghan History through Afghan Eyes. Oxford University Press. pp. 53–78.
- Lee, Jonathan (1996). The "Ancient Supremacy": Bukhara, Afghanistan and the Battle for Balkh, 1731-1901. Brill.
- Tarzi, Amin (2016). "Tarikh-i Ahmad Shahi: The First History of 'Afghanistan'". In Green, Nile (ed.). Afghan History through Afghan Eyes. Oxford University Press. pp. 79–86.
