= Ahmad Shah Batalvi =

- Born: 19th century
- Occupation: Punjabi historian
- Notable work: Kitab-i-Hind (Twarikh-i-Hind), Tarikh-i Panjab

Ahmad Shah Batalvi (fl. 19th century) was a Punjabi historian from Batala, Punjab, active during the first half of the 19th century. He authored Kitab-i-Hind or Twarikh-i-Hind, a history of India, in 1818, and Tarikh-i Panjab, a history of Punjab, in 1820.

Batalvi belonged to a qadi family of Batala and had relations with Ranjit Singh. His works were originally written in Persian. British official W. L. M'Gregor had Kitab-i-Hind translated into Urdu for use in his History of the Sikhs (1846). Tarikh-i-Panjab was translated into Punjabi by Gurbax Singh Frank and published by Punjabi University, Patiala, in 1969.
