= Najm Hosain Syed =

Pakistani writer (born 1936)

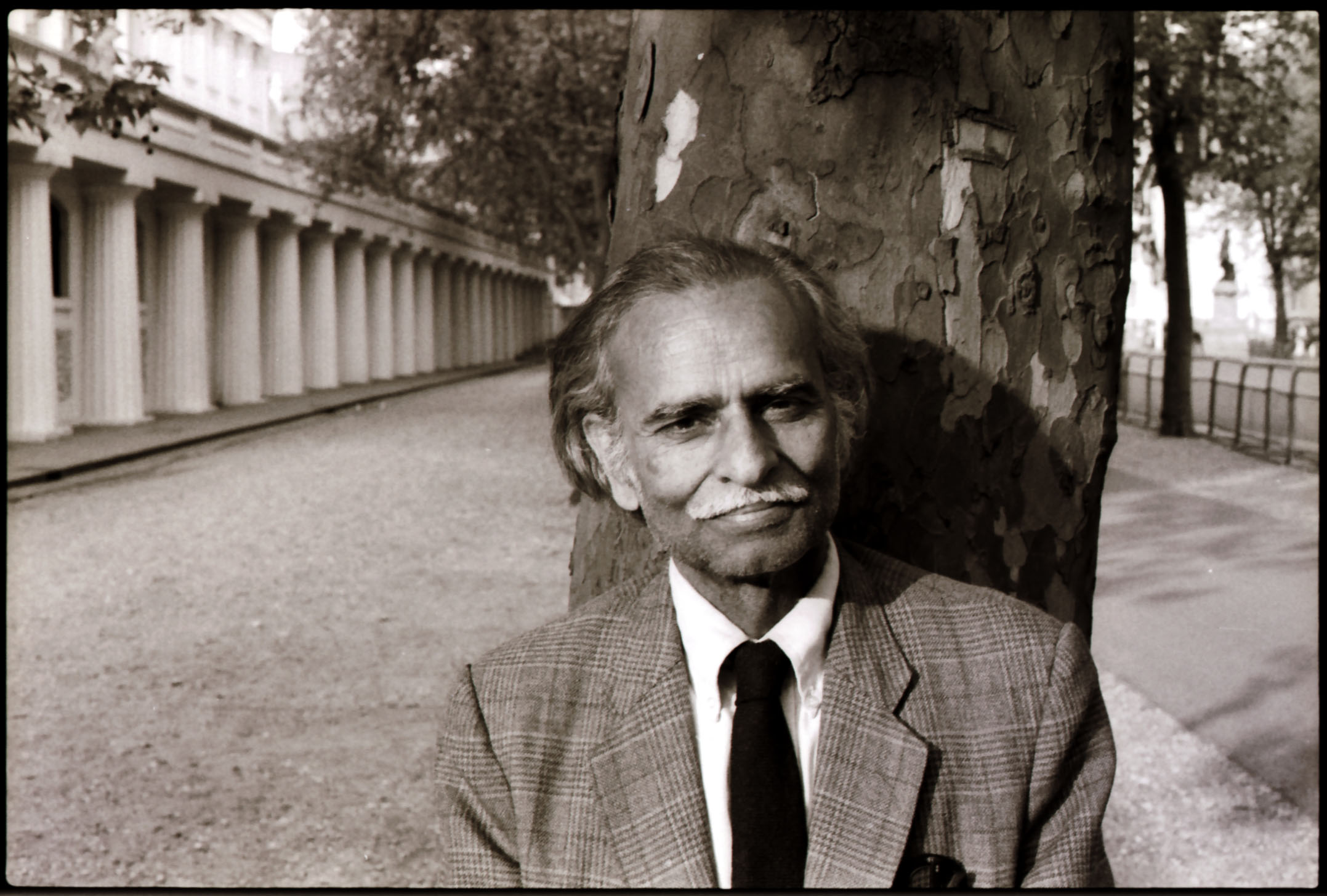

Najm Hosain Syed (Note: Punjabi: نجم حسین سید) (born 1935) is a Pakistani writer of Punjabi language. He has written poetry and plays in the Punjabi language as well as literary criticism on Punjabi literature in his Recurrent Patterns in Punjabi Poetry. A well known Punjabi poem of his is Roz Mildiyan Di Ek Dujay Nu Kuno Kun Sunaye Achanba Gal.

== Early life and career ==
Najm Hosain Syed was born in 1936 in Batala, Punjab, British India and later moved to Lahore, Pakistan after the independence of Pakistan in 1947. He received his master's degree in English from Forman Christian College, Lahore in 1958. For his career, he joined the Pakistan Civil Service and worked there until his retirement in 1995.

He was married to classical singer Samina Syed, who died of cancer in 2016.

Najm Hosain Syed has mentored many writers and has been a source of guidance for many others interested in Punjabi literature. Najm Hosain Syed and his classical-music-singer wife Samina Syed (1944-2016) used to hold weekly gatherings or live music concerts at their home in Lahore for music enthusiasts called Sangat from the 1970s onwards until her death in 2016. Samina Syed had learned classical music from Ustad Chotay Ghulam Ali of Patiala Gharana. Najm Syed reportedly does not give interviews on television or radio. He chooses to publish his books with relatively less-known publishers.

== Major works ==
Najm Hosain Syed has written poetry, criticism and plays in Punjabi. He has published over 100 books. He is considered pioneer of the modern Punjabi literature.

His major works include:

- Deewa Mundri (2010)
- Gal Waar Di (2010)
- Khyal Dukkad (2011)
- Rang (2000)
- Khappay (1986) - Punjabi Adabi Markaz, Lahore
- Kafian (1965)
- Chandan Rukh Tay Vehda (1968)
- Kkyal keh Khayal
- Takht Lahore (The Throne of Lahore) (1970)
- Sedhaan (The Directions) (1967)
- Saaran (The Awareness) (1974)
- Alfo Pairni Di Vaar
- Bar di Var (1969)
- Harh De Phull (1989)
- Sachch Sada Abadi Karna (Always Cultivate the Truth) (1988)
- Ikk Raat Ravi Di (1983)

Many works of Syed are directed in the form of plays by Huma Safdar's theatre "Sangat" such as "Rajni" and Ik Raat Ravi Di.
