= Muhammad Asif Khan (writer) =

Muhammad Asif Khan (29 November 1929 – 17 March 2000) was a Punjabi writer, critic and linguist. He also served as secretary of Punjabi Adabi Board from 1982 until his death.

== Career ==
Muhammad Asif Khan was born on 29 November 1929 in the Basti Danishmandan, in Jullundur District. He obtained his M. A. Degree in Punjabi. The literary career of Muhammad Asif Khan spanned over four decades, from 1956 to 1992, during which he wrote and published over two hundreds books and some one hundred articles on Punjabi language. He was also a polyglot and knew Hindi, Sanskrit, Pushto, Balochi, Sindhi, and Japanese. During his lifetime he also published and served as editor of several Punjabi language journals, including monthly Punjabi Adab (1960 – 1972) and biannual Punjabi Adab (1987 – 2000).

== Bibliography ==
=== Works ===
- Muḍhlī lafẓālī (in Punjabi). Pākistān Panjābī Adabī Borḍ. 1976.
- Ahmad Khan Kharral (in Punjabi). Pākistān Panjābī Adabī Borḍ. 1980.
- Kan lekhā (in Punjabi). Pākistān Panjābī Adabī Borḍ. 1984.
- Sindhi Adab (in Urdu). Pākistān Panjābī Adabī Borḍ. 1991.
- Nik suk: maz̤mūnan̲ dā majmūah (in Punjabi). Pākistān Panjābī Adabī Borḍ. 1992. ISBN 978-969-411-126-1 – via Apnaorg.com.
- Punjabi boli da pachokar. Pākistān Panjābī Adabī Borḍ. 2014 [1996]. ISBN 969-411-159-5 – via Internet Archives.
- Hor nik suk (in Punjabi). Pākistān Panjābī Adabī Borḍ. 2000 – via Apnaorg.com.

=== Edited ===
- Farid, Baba (1978). Akhiya Baba Farid nay (in Punjabi). Pākistān Panjābī Adabī Borḍ.
- Damodar (1986). Hīr Damodar: Hīr Rānjhe dā pahlā Panjābī qiṣṣah (in Punjabi). Pākistān Panjābī Adabī Borḍ.
- Husain, Shah (1987). Kāfiyān̲ Shāh Ḥusain (in Punjabi). Pākistān Panjābī Adabī Borḍ. ISBN 978-969-477-090-1.
- Shāh, Bullhe (1992). Akhiya Bullhe Shah ney (in Punjabi). Pākistān Panjābī Adabī Borḍ. ISBN 978-969-411-120-9.
