= Mian Umar Hayat =

Member of National Assembly of Pakistan
- In office 1988–1992

Personal details
- Born: 1945 Lahore, Punjab, British India
- Died: 1996 (aged 50–51)

Mian Umar Hayat (born 1945 in Lahore, Punjab, Pakistan, died 1996) was a businessman and entered into politics in 1988. He was twice elected as a Member of the National Assembly of Pakistan, serving two consecutive terms, the first from November, 1988–1990 and 1990–1992.

== Early life ==
His family was a prominent landlord and lawful Arain family in Lahore. His father, Mian Muhammad Akbar, was a barrister. He was admitted to the bar at law from University of Lincoln, England.

He served as the chairman of Pakistan Railways.
