= Basharat Ullah =

Punjabi painter

Sheikh Basharat Ullah (1801–1892), also known as Basahathullah or Basahatullah, was a Punjabi miniature painter who was employed as a court-painter for various states, such as Patiala State. (Note: His name is alternatively spelt as 'Bisharat Ullah'. An inscription on one of his paintings gives his full name with titles as Qalem Basharat 'Allah Masur.)

== Biography ==
Basharat's family were originally from Lahore but were also based in Delhi and later Patiala, where they remained for over a hundred and fifty years. Basharat Ullah was the son of Allah Ditta, another artist. (Note: His father's name is alternatively spelt as 'Alla Ditta'.) His father Allah Ditta moved to Patiala to work as a court-painter after studying the art of miniature painting under Mirza Shah Rukh Beg in Delhi.

In 1825, Basharat was based out of Lahore of the Sikh Empire. Due to his family background, he was knowledgeable in Mughal miniature styles. He painted Sikh themes and was heavily influenced by the Pahari school of art, such as the Kangra style. He was the disciple of Shiva Ram of Patiala and also Purkhu of Kangra.

Basharat Ullah's son was Haji Muhammad Sharif, who also became an artist. Basharat initially wanted his son to become a watchmaker instead of an artist. Basharat had his son trained by Muhammad Hasan Khan of Delhi. Muhammad Sharif would also be employed by the Patiala Durbar until 1944.

== Legacy ==
Some of his inscribed works have survived till the present. Some of Basharat's works are preserved in the Toor Collection.

== Gallery ==
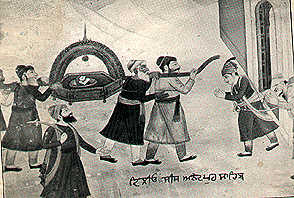
Painting of the head of Guru Tegh Bahadar being brought to Anandpur, where Guru Gobind Singh pays obeisance, circa 19th century

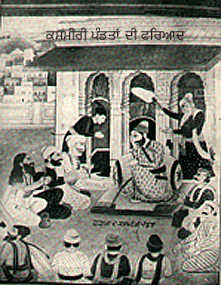
Painting of Kashmiri Pandits petitioning Guru Tegh Bahadur for help against persecution of Hindus in Kashmir by the Mughal Empire, circa 19th century

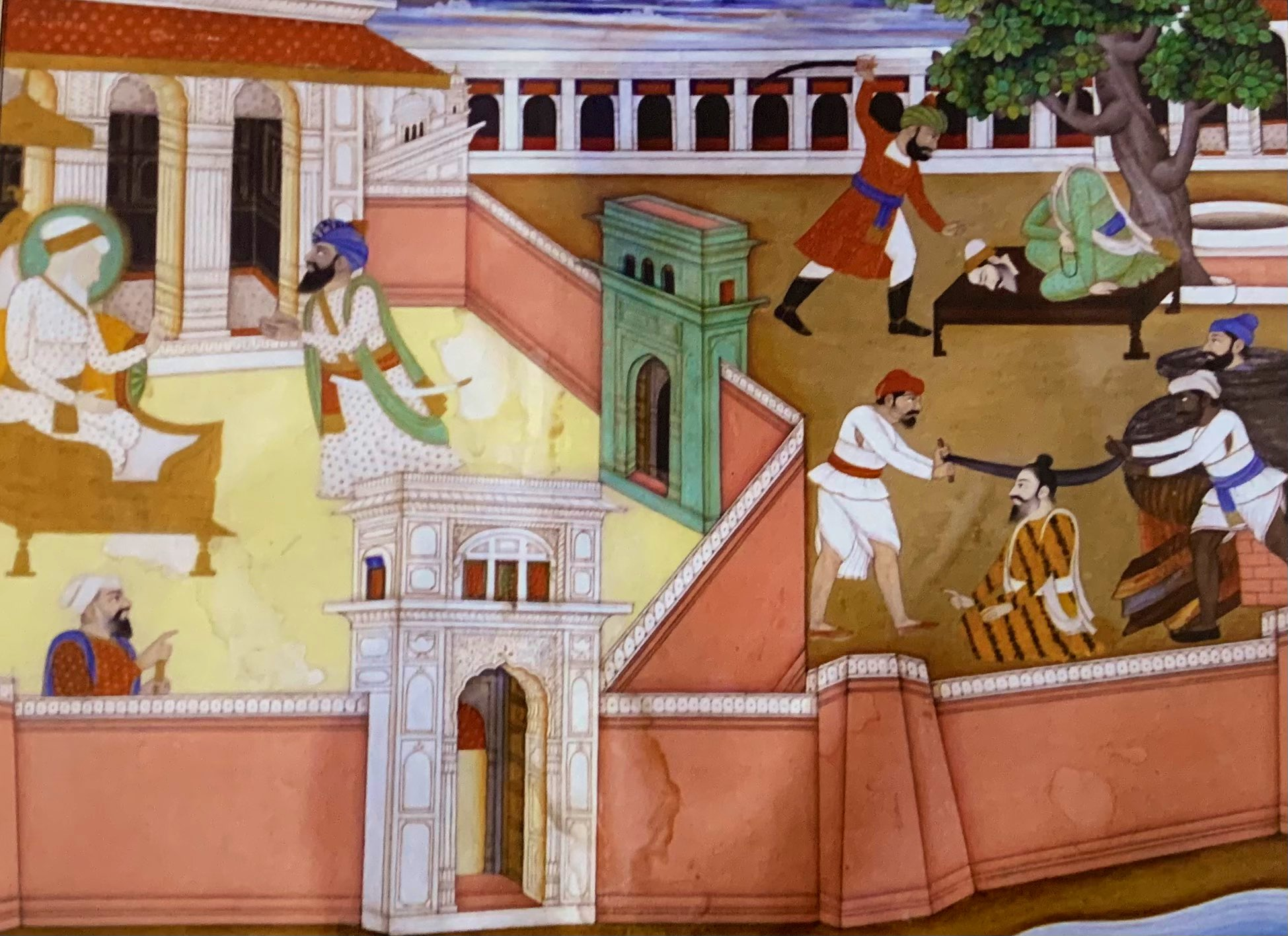
Aurangzeb sitting on his throne, receiving the news of the martyrdom of Guru Tegh Bahadur and the Guru's companions, Bhai Mati Das and Bhai Dayala Das at Delhi's Chandi Chowk

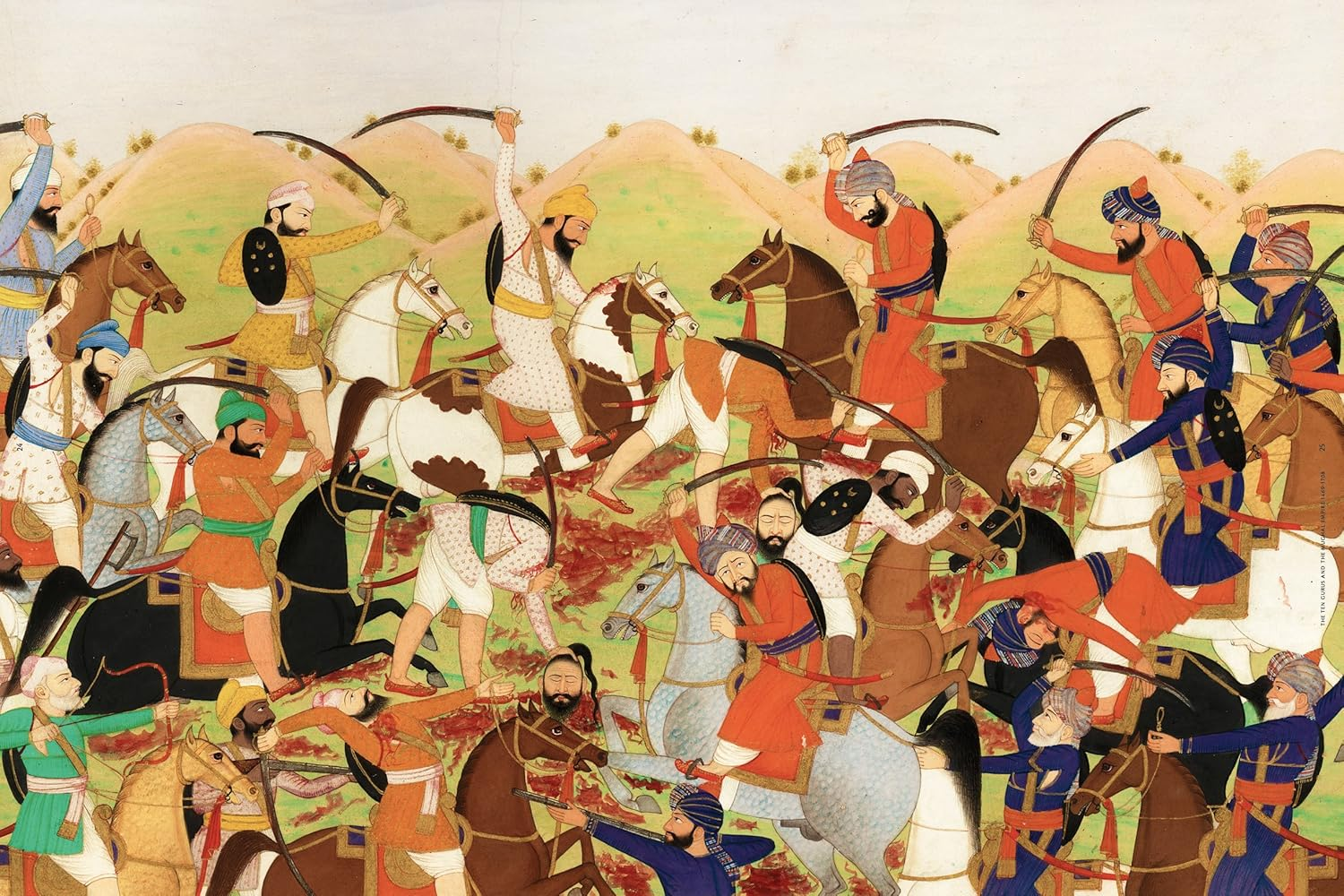
Painting of Sikhs in battle

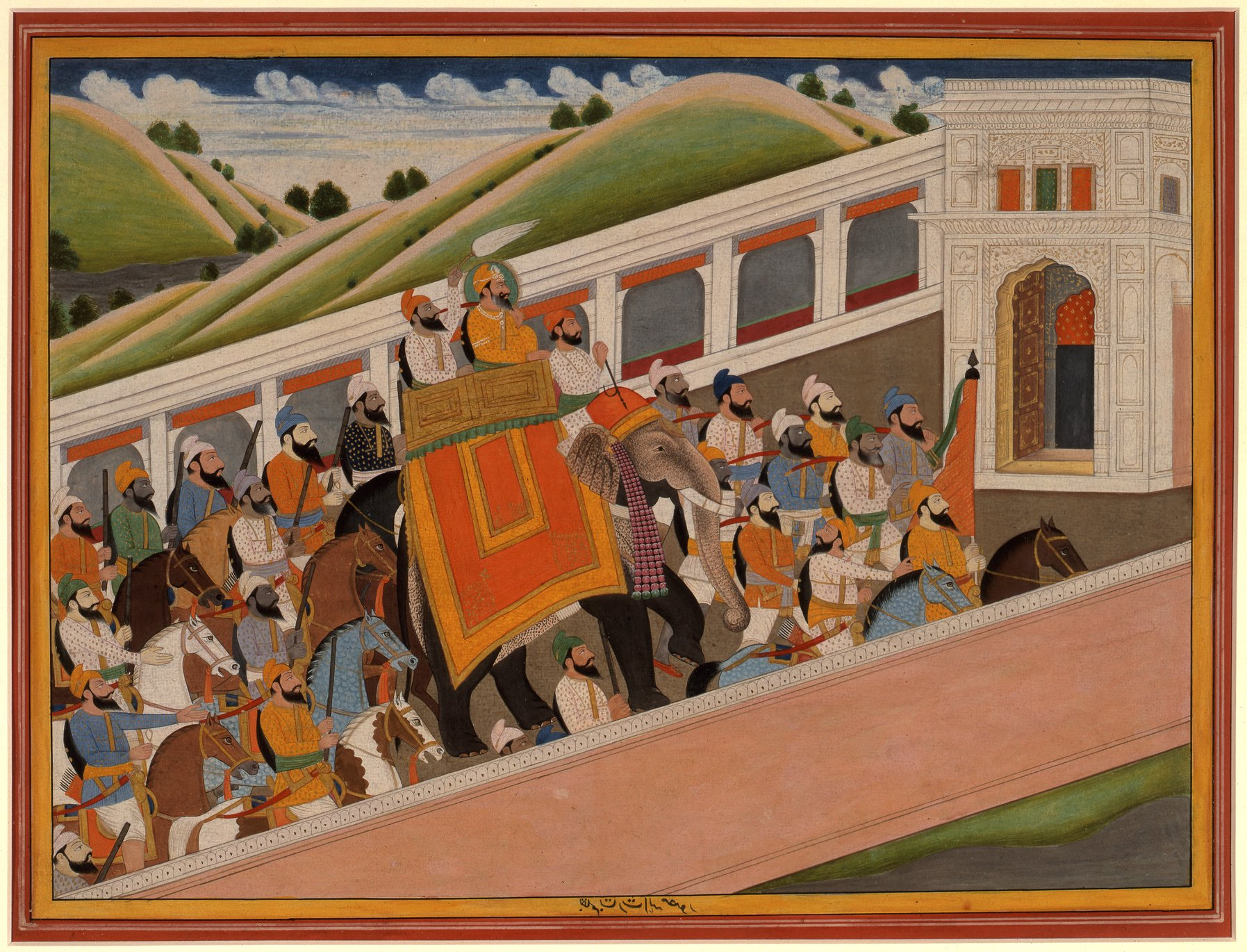
Maharajah Narinder Singh of Patiala on an elephant proceeding up the rampart of a palace

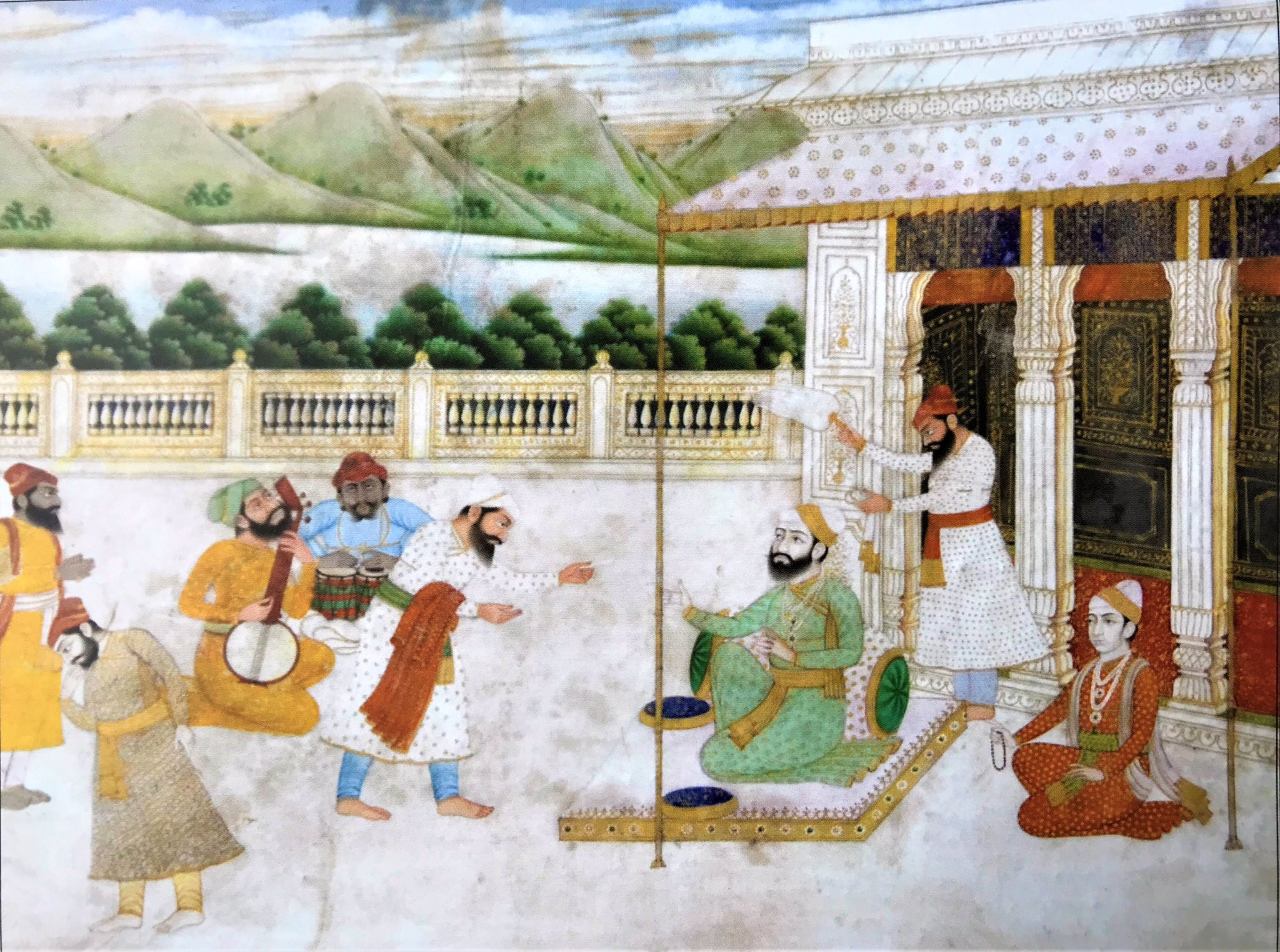
Guru Tegh Bahadar and a young Gobind Rai at the Anandpur Darbar

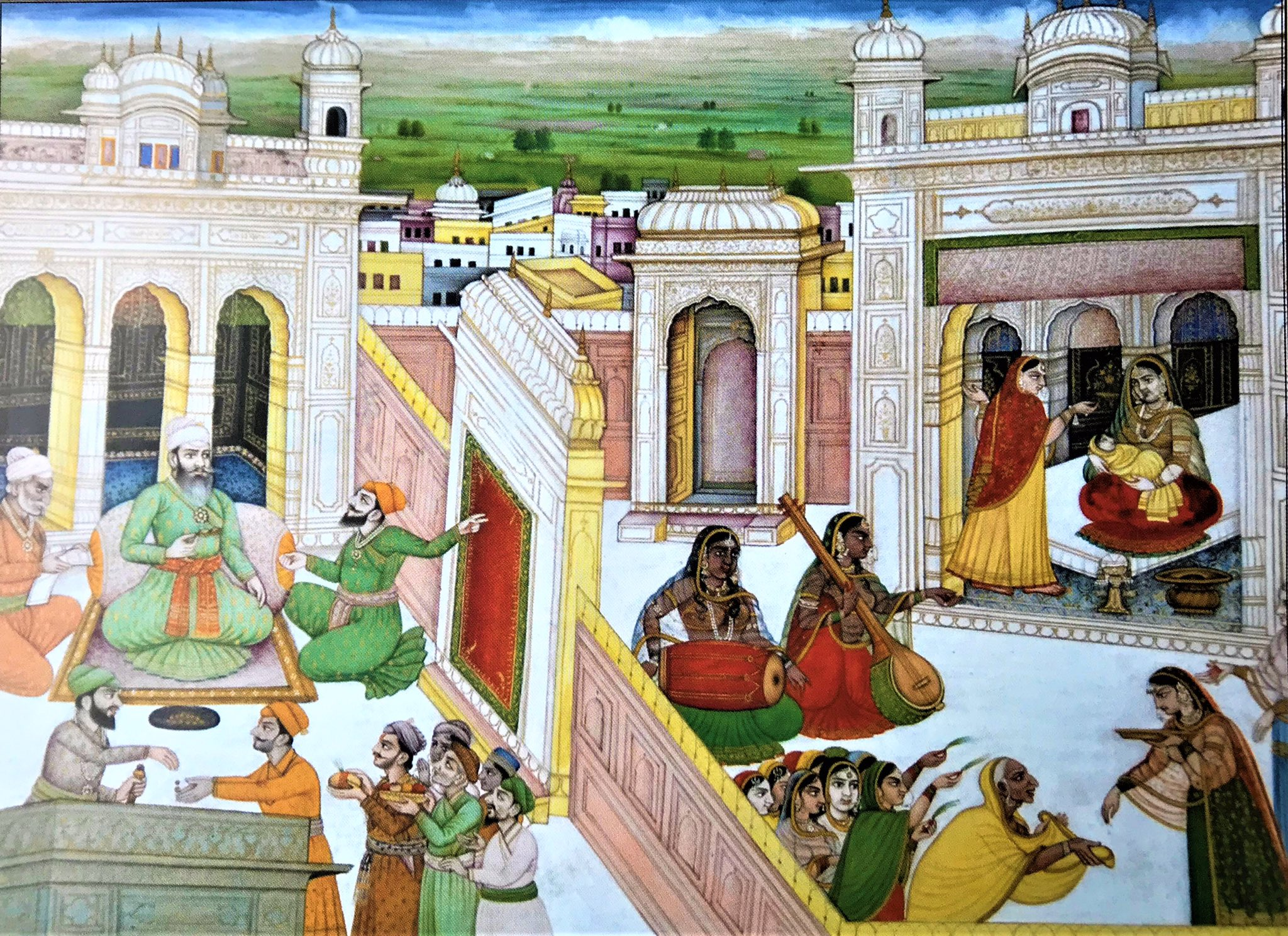
Guru Tegh Bahadar receives news of the birth of Gobind Rai

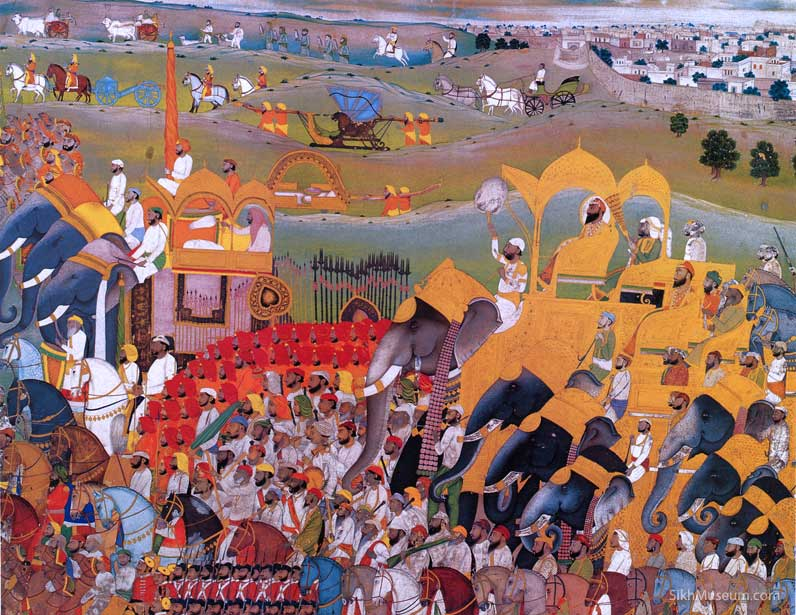
Painting of Maharaja Narinder Singh of Patiala State in procession, ca.1850

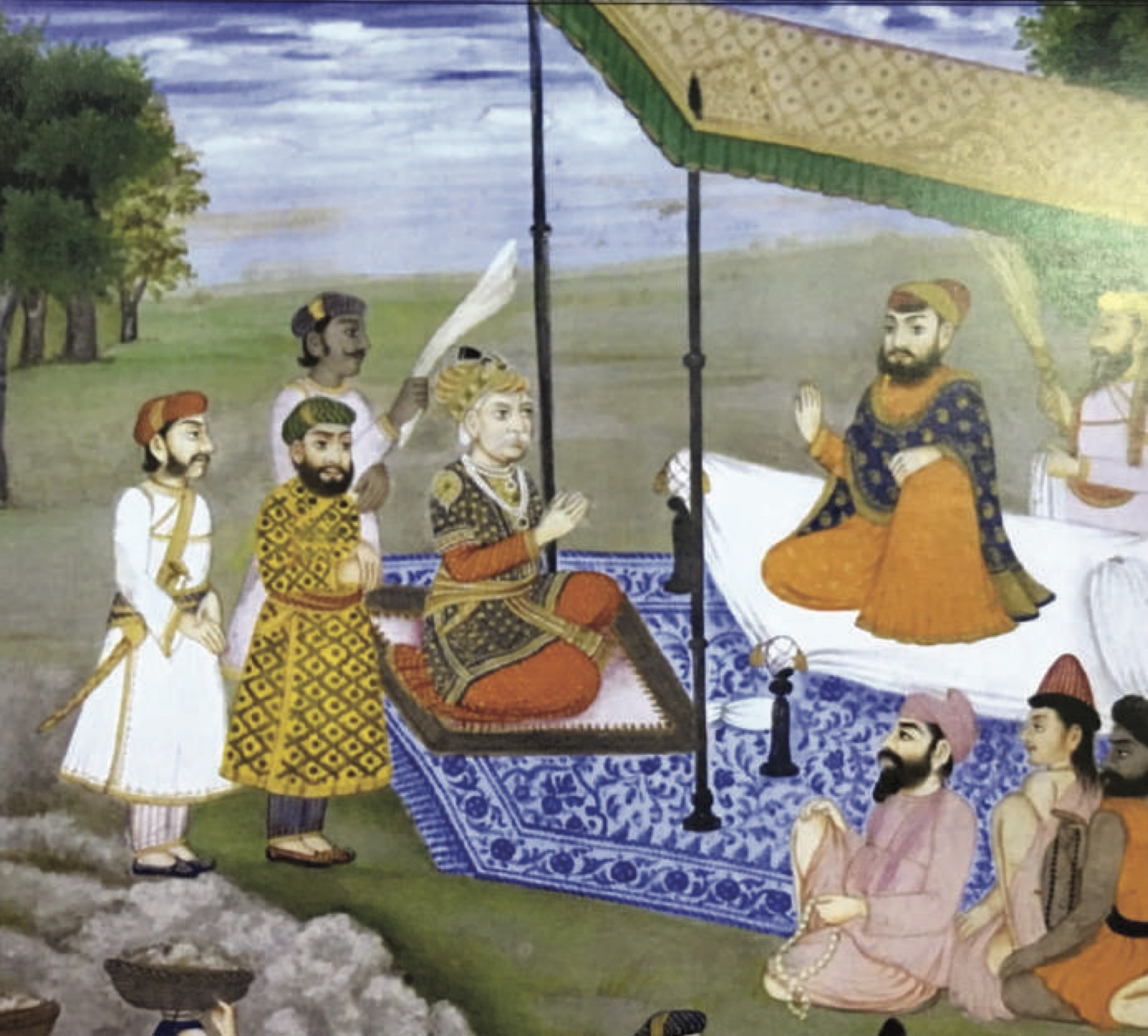
Painting of Mughal emperor Akbar meeting Guru Amar Das in 1567 at Goindwal

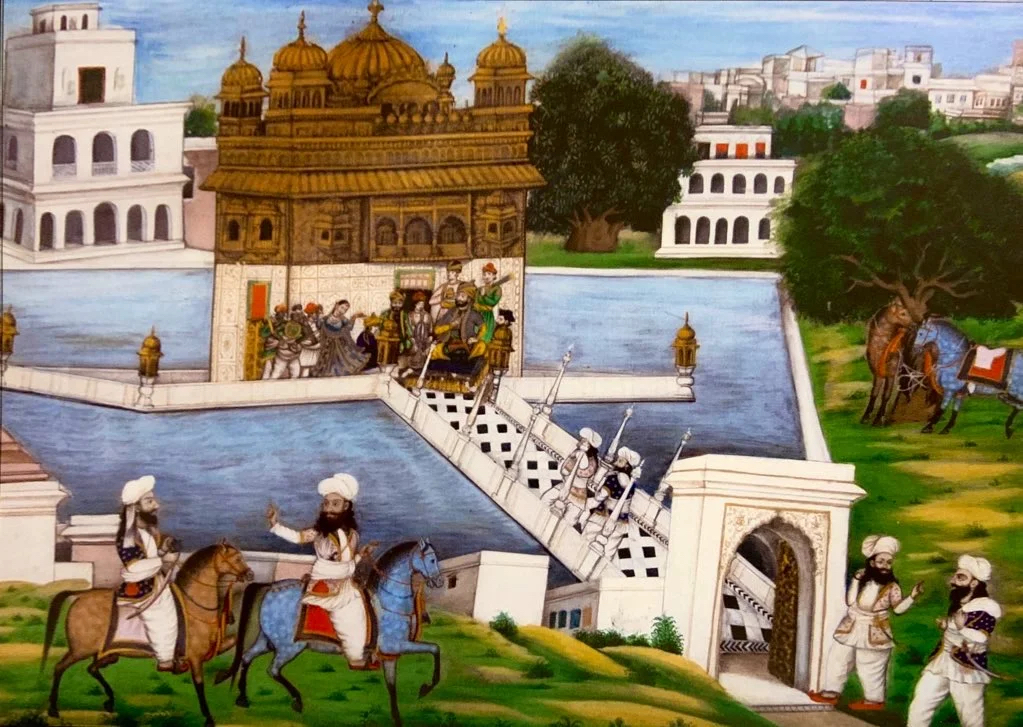
Bhai Sukha and Bhai Mehtab Singh confront Massa Ranghar
