= Abdullah Lahori =

17th century Punjabi Poet

Abdullah Lahori (Punjabi: عبداللہ لاہوری, romanized: ʿAbdullāh Lāhūrī), also known by his pen name ʿAbdī, was one of the earliest Punjabi prose writer and poet, active between 1616 and 1666 in the Mughal Empire.

== Life ==
ʿAbdī was born at Malka Hāṇs in Sāhīwāl, Punjab. He spent most of his life at Lahore; other than that, little details are known about his life.

== Works ==
Between 1616 and 1666, ʿAbdī composed a major work on fiqh in Punjabi under the title of Bāra Anva ("Twelve Topics") in 9,000 couplets. These twelve books included:

- Risāla-yi tuḥfa (1616)
- Naṣṣ-i farāʾiḍ (1622)
- Khulāṣat al-muʿāmalāt (1643)
- Anwāʿ al-ʿulūm (1634)
- Maʿrifat-i ilāhī (1645)
- Khayr al-ʿāshiqīn kalān (1644)
- Farāʾiḍ-i Sharḥ-i Sirājī (1648)
- Khayr al-ʿāshiqīn khurd
- Ḥiṣār al-īmān
- Ṣayqal-i awwal
- Ṣayqal-i duvvum
- Ḥamd wa-thanā

In addition to Bāra Anva, he wrote several other treatises including rīsālā fīqh hīndī (1666) and tūhfā tūl tūlaba.

== Bibliography ==
- Shackle, Christopher (2012). "ʿAbdī". In Fleet, Kate; Krämer, Gudrun; Matringe, Denis; Nawas, John; Rowson, Everett (eds.). Encyclopaedia of Islam (3rd ed.). Brill Online. doi:10.1163/1573-3912_ei3_COM_24158. ISSN 1873-9830.
- Hāshmī, Ḥamīdullāh Shāh (1988). Panjābī Zabān o Adab. Silsilah-yi mat̤būʻāt-i Anjuman Taraqqī-yi Urdū, Pākistān (in Urdu). Karācī: Anjuman-i Taraqqī-yi Urdū Pākistān. ISBN 978-969-403-002-9.
