= Allah Ditta Loonay Wala =

Pakistani musician (1957-2021)

- Born: 1957; Loonay Wala, near Chiniot, Punjab, Pakistan
- Died: 29 June 2021 (aged 63–64); Chiniot, Punjab, Pakistan
- Burial place: Chiniot, Punjab, Pakistan
- Occupation: Singer • songwriter • composer
- Years active: 1965–2021
- Awards: Pride of performance award by the President of Pakistan
- Musical career
- Origin: Punjab, Pakistan
- Genres: Ghazal; Folk music; Indian pop

Allah Ditta Loonay Wala was a Punjabi folk singer from Pakistan.

== Early life ==
Allah Ditta Loonay Wala was born in Loonay Wala, a village, near Chiniot, Punjab, Pakistan in 1957. Early on in his life, his father hoped that he would become a doctor and serve his village community. Instead, he made his village's name known in the music field by becoming a well known folk singer in Pakistan. He went to school for his basic education, but when he started singing at the school events, he was noticed by his teachers. Soon after, he started participating in local music competitions.

== Career ==
Musically, he was trained by a classical music teacher Mian Issa and Mian Talib Hussain. He also performed at PTV music shows.

Songs from his albums include:

- "Shaaman Peiy Gayyaan"
- "Ticketaan Do Leiy Leiy"
- "Main Cham Cham Nachdi PhiraaN".
- "Akheen LaaiYan"
- "Chhan Chhan ChhankaN WangaaN"
- "UcchiaN LammiYaN Tahlian"
- "Sohney Rang Di Daachi"
- "Jei Tuun Likhian Naseeban Vich Judaaiyan, Jhole Da Gilla Kyun Kariye"
- "Do Do Thaan Tei Pyar Vi Changay Hoondey Nahin"

== Personal life ==
He had five children, including three sons and two daughters. His eldest son, Zaheer Abbas Loonay Wala, is a programs producer at Radio Pakistan, Lahore, Pakistan. His youngest son, Nadeem Abbas Loonay Wala has become a folk singer like his father in Pakistan.

== Death ==
He died on 29 June 2021 of a heart attack, aged 64.

== Awards and honors ==
- Pride of Performance award from the President of Pakistan.
- 'Pride of Punjab' award from the Punjab Institute of Languages, Arts and Culture.
