= Punjab Lok Rahs =

- Type: Not-for-profit arts organization
- Industry: Entertainment
- Genre: Punjabi plays, street theatre, experimental theatre, social awareness & performance
- Founded: 1986; 40 years ago
- Founder: Zubair Ahmad
- Headquarters: Lahore, Punjab, Pakistan
- Area served: Pakistan
- Key people: Zubair Ahmad
- Website: lokpunjab.org

Punjab Lok Rahs started working as an independent alternative theater group in 1986. The group has seen a number of upheavals both internal and external during its history. On average, the group has held a performance every fortnight since its creation.

It started as a group of young men and women, primarily students, that was concerned with the military oppression of arts and cultural activities in Pakistan. The group cherished a society that has gender equity and democratic values, respects all humans and offers equal economic opportunities to all. Rahs believes in organized and conscious efforts to realize this dream. Theater is its medium.

Rahs’ experience in the art of theater is very deep as well. From staging classical epics to quick response street skits and from working out foreign adaptations to improvising ones with community and from performing at overseas festivals to villages and urban slums, Rahs has touched upon a host of issues. Rahs’ canvas is very wide and diverse as it has dealt with subjects like child marriage and women's right to marry of their free will and staged plays against the arms race and military dictatorship.

Besides experimentation and experience, Rahs has learned theater from its gurus like Badal Sarkar. Its members have received training from many institutions in other countries.

The group has imparted theater training to a number of civil society organizations as well. It has supported scores of other organizations by performing for the communities with which they work.

Rahs draws inspiration from Punjab's indigenous theater tradition. Its name ‘Rahs’ is the Punjabi word for the local form of theater and its logo shows the basic props of this theater. The group aims to marry the tradition with modern techniques and concepts and make it an effective tool in the hands of organizations working for social change.

Rahs performs plays only in the mother language of its audience – the people of Punjab. The group believes that the mother language lies at the heart of the issue of cultural identity. The group not only performs but also trains other dramatic societies and community organizations to do theater as an art and use it as an effective tool of communication.
