= Farad Faqir =

Punjabi sufi poet

Khawaja Farad Faqir

Personal life
- Born: 1704/1720 Gujrat, Punjab
- Died: 1790
- Era: Contemporary

Religious life
- Religion: Islam
- Denomination: Sunni
- Jurisprudence: Hanafi
- Creed: Maturidi

Farad Faqir (1704/1720–1790, Punjabi: فرد فقیر) was a Punjabi Muslim Sufi, author and Poet. According to Baba Budh Singh, "Faqir was the saint who raised the voice against injustice of the contemporary rulers."

== Early life ==
Faqir was born in 1704 in a small area of Gujrat.

== Works ==
- Kasab-Nama
- Si-harafi
- Bashindgan
- Roshan Dil
- Barah Mah
