= Garh More =

Garh More گڑھ موڑ
- Location within Pakistan
- Coordinates: 30.50°N 71.54°E
- Country: Pakistan
- Province: Punjab

Area
  - Total: 10 km^{2} (3.9 sq mi)

Population (2011)
  - Total: 5,000
- Time zone: UTC+5 (PST)
- Calling code: 047
- Number of Union councils: 1
- by Garh More Citizen Movement

Garh More (گڑھ موڑ) is a town of Jhang District in the Punjab province of Pakistan. Garh More is situated between the District of Jhang and Layyah. Multan is 140 km away and Jhang is 75 km away from Garh More. To the east of Garh More there is the river Chenab. This area is known for its fertile land and crops such as wheat, cotton, rice, corn, and vegetables are cultivated locally. It is also a hub of the transportation business. It is located at 30°50'0" North, 71°54'0" East.
