= Ahmad Kamboh =

Miyān Aḥmad bin Bahbal bin Jamāl Kamboh (fl. 17th-century) was a Mughal period historian and author of a universal history, Maʿdan-i Akhbār-i Aḥmadī, completed in 1614 CE, during the reign of Jahangir. This work, in two volumes, was cited by several other authors, including Nimat Allah al-Harawi and Ahmad Yadgar. His father was in retinue of Bairam Khan in the service of Akbar while Tarikh-i-Khan-Jahani refers to him with nisbah Dehlavi, suggesting his association with Delhi. However, the work itself was written independent of Mughal court.

The first volume deals with legendary kings of Persia, Umayyads, Abbasids, Mongols, Byzantines, Safavids, Uzbeks, Ghaznavids, Ghurids, Delhi Sultanate, rulers of China and other dynasties. The second volume dealt with Timurids, starting form Timur and ending with Akbar, including portion on the Sur dynasty. The sections on the Lodi and Sur dynasties were of particular interest for the contemporary and modern historians.
