= Samina Syed =

Punjabi-language singer & music teacher

Samina Hasan Syed
- Born: December 1944; Ferozepur, Punjab, British India
- Died: 17 September 2016 (aged 71–72); Lahore, Punjab, Pakistan
- Occupation: Singer
- Spouse: Najm Hosain Syed
- Children: Risham Syed (daughter), Rasaal Hasan Syed (son)

Samina Hasan Syed (1944 – 17 September 2016), was a Punjabi-language singer and music teacher from Pakistan. Her music can be found on https://m.soundcloud.com/saminahasansyed She learnt with great masters like Bhai Chhaila, Ustad Chhottay Ghulam Ali Khan of Qawal Bacha Gharana, to name a few. She recorded her singing lessons with Ustad Chhotay Ghulam Ali Khan over a decade. It was her wish to make these accessible to researchers and practitioners of music and so her daughter, Risham Syed, an eminent Visual artist organized these in her memory on https://khayalmala.org/

== Early life and career ==
Samina was born in Ferozepur, Punjab Province, British India in December 1944. She was trained in classical music by the noted Pakistani film composer Feroze Nizami, Bhai Chela and Ustad Chhotay Ghulam Ali Khan. After her training in classical music, she herself taught music at the College of Home Economics, Lahore for over three decades.

== Social and cultural activities ==
Samina Hasan Syed was married to Najm Hosain Syed. Both of them were big enthusiasts for Punjabi culture, Punjabi literature and the Punjabi language. On a regular basis, they would arrange a weekly meeting at their home in Lahore which was open to all interested in Punjabi culture. Other common interests the couple had was Punjabi poetry and Punjabi music where Samina along with the guests sang Punjabi classical poetry composed by her husband Najm Hosain Syed.

== Death and legacy ==
She died on 17 September 2016 at the age of 72. Samina Syed was suffering from cancer for some time before her death. She was buried at Baba Shah Jamal graveyard in Lahore, Pakistan. Many prominent personalities of Lahore attended the funeral including Salima Hashmi, Madeeha Gauhar, Zaeem Qadri and the famous Pakistani architect Nayyar Ali Dada.
