= Punjabi Adabi Board =

Punjabi Adabi Board (پنجابی ادبی بورڈ) is an institute for the development and promotion of the Punjabi language. Based in Lahore, Pakistan, it was established by the Government of Punjab in 1975.

== Activities ==
Punjabi Adabi Board has published a number of works on Punjabi poetry, folklore, classic works, and literature. The organisation has also re-published works of Punjabi classical authors.
