= Mirza Hasan Qatil =

18th-century Urdu and Persian author

Mirza Muhammad Hasan Qatīl (Urdu: مرزا محمد حسن قتیل; c. 1758–1818) was an 18th-century Urdu and Persian-language poet and author.

== Biography ==
Mirza Qatīl was born in 1758 as Diwani Singh into a Punjabi Khatri family in Delhi. His family hailed from the city of Batala in Punjab; his father Dargahi Mal had migrated from Punjab to Delhi and took service under a Mughal noble Hidayat Ali Khan as a munshī, with an annual salary of 1000 rupees.

Like other Khatri families of his age, Qatīl had his early education in Persian and Urdu. Under the influence of his tutor, Mirza Baqir Shahid Isfahani, he converted to Twelver Shi'a Islam at the age of 18. He travelled widely in the countries of Iraq and Iran, and after returning to Delhi, spent a few years in the army of Mirza Najaf Khan. After the death of Najaf Khan he moved to Lucknow in 1784 where he became an established poet and philologist. Except for a brief time he spent at the court of Imad-ul-Mulk Feroz Jang III in Kalpi, Qatīl remained in Lucknow until his death in 1817, and was buried in Qaisar Bagh, Lucknow.

== Works ==
Qatīl was a prolific author and a polyglot, writing in Persian and Urdu as well as in Turkish and Arabic. He became a leading poet of Persian and Urdu in Lucknow during his lifetime. However, his fame rests mainly on his scholarly works in prose. His major works include:

- Chahār sharbat, a Persian grammar
- Ma'dan al-Fawā'id, a collection of his letters by his pupil Khwaja Imam al-Din Imami
- His Persian Divān
- Ṣubḥ-i bahār, a collection of Mathnavis,
- Haft tamāshā, a work on the ethnography of people of Indian subcontinent
- Maz̤har al-‘ajā’ib, a collection of poetic tropes
- Shajarat al-amānī and Nahr al-faṣāḥat, works on Persian grammar and rhetoric
- Samar al-Badā’i’ and Hadīqat al-insha’, works on Insha (letters)

== Sources ==
- Pellò, Stefano (2016). "A Linguistic Conversion: Mīrzā Muḥammad Ḥasan Qatīl and the Varieties of Persian (ca. 1790)". Borders: Itineraries on the Edges of Iran. Italy: Ca' Foscari University of Venice. pp. 203–240. doi:10.14277/6969-100-3/eur-5-9. ISBN 978-88-6969-100-3.
- Alam, Muzaffar; Subrahmanyam, Sanjay (2010). "Witnesses and Agents of Empire: Eighteenth-Century Historiography and the World of the Mughal Munshī". Journal of the Economic and Social History of the Orient. 53 (1/2). Brill: 393–423. ISSN 0022-4995. JSTOR 25651223.
- Hadi, Nabi (1995). "Qatīl, Mirzā Muhammad Hasan". Dictionary of Indo-Persian Literature. Indira Gandhi National Centre for the Arts. ISBN 978-81-7017-311-3.
