= Mufti Ali-ud-Din =

Mufti Ali-ud-Din (fl. 1823–1856) was a 19th-century chronicler from Punjab. He authored his work on the history of Punjab, Umdat-ut-tawarikh wa Ibratnama, known as Ibratnama for short, in 1854.

Ali-ud-Din was originally from Lahore. In 1823 he migrated with his father Mufti Khair-ud-Din from Lahore, then the capital of the Sikh Kingdom of Ranjit Singh, to Ludhiana in the British territory. The migration was, according to his own claim, prompted by the "oppression of the Sikhs"; Bhagat Singh believes it was due to his orthodox beliefs and opposition to the Sikh rule. At Ludhiana he found employment under the British Political Resident and served in a number of places across Punjab, Sind, Marwar, Kashmir and Afghanistan. Eventually he settled at Lahore in 1854 where he completed his history.

Ibratnama was originally planned and drafted by Mufti Khair-ud-Din in 1823 on the directions by Claude Martin Wade, the British agent at Ludhiana, but it could not be completed during his tenure. Mufti Ali-ud-Din dedicated the work to Charles Raikes, the then commissioner of Lahore. In Ibratnama Ali-ud-Din has been critical of the works of his three contemporary chroniclers, Sohan Lal Suri's Umdat-ut-Tawarikh, Bute Shah's Tawarikh-i-Panjab, and Diwan Amarnath's Zafarnama-i-Ranjit Singh, and has held his own work highly.
