= Bute Shah =

19th century Punjabi historian (died 1850)

Ghulam Muhy-ud-Din Ludhianvi, better known as Bute Shah (died c. 1850) was a 19th-century historian from Punjab. He authored the Persian-language work Twarikh-i-Panjab ("The History of Punjab") in 1848.

Bute Shah belonged to an Awan family from Ludhiana and was employed by the British Political Resident. He was in the British emissary which was sent to the court of Ranjit Singh in 1837, where he along with the delegation met the maharaja in the company of Fakir Azizuddin and was granted a robe of honour and 100 rupees, according to Sohan Lal Suri.

Bute Shah wrote his Twarikh-i-Panjab on the request of George Russell Clerk who had succeeded Claude Martin Wade as the Political Resident in 1840. He completed this work in 1848. He divided it into a muqadama (introduction), five daftars or sections and a khatima (epilogue). His history starts from the earliest times to the annexation of Punjab by the British. Bute Shah used a variety of sources: the religious texts of Hindus including Bhagavad Gita and Mahabharata for reconstructing the early history of Punjab; Tarikh-i-Yamini, Habib al-siyar, Tarikh-i-Alfi and other chronicles for the Muslim period; and especially the Umdat-ut-Tawarikh of Sohan Lal Suri for the events during the reign of Ranjit Singh, in writing his book. The introduction, which dealt with the geography and the main places of Punjab, was translated by Munshi Bahlol into Punjabi and published after the death of Bute Shah by the American Presbyterian Mission at Ludhiana in 1850.

== See also ==
- Mufti Ali-ud-Din
- Nizam al-Din 'Ishrat Sialkoti
