= Veer Bhan =

Marwari merchant, scholar, and doctor

Mural depicting Veer Bhan of Amritsar, circa mid-19th century

Veer Bhan (fl. 19th century), also spelt Vir Bhan, was a Marwari trader, scholar, and doctor who flourished in Amritsar during the Sikh Empire of Maharaja Ranjit Singh. In his company, he brought a number of Rajasthani merchants to the city and built a Shaivist temple in the settlement. Veer Bhan was a vaid, a practitioner of ayurveda. He was awarded the misr title by Sher Singh. A samadhi dedicated to him is located near his associated temple in Amritsar. He is referenced in Sohan Lal Suri's Umdat-ut-Tawarikh.

== Temple ==
Fresco depicting the Ganges river descending from the locks of Shiva's hair, from the Veer Bhan Da Shivala, Amritsar, circa late-19th century

Veer Bhan Da Shivala is a Shaivist temple (shivala) located in Ghee Mandi Gate, Amritsar, Punjab, India. The temple was constructed by Misr Veer Bhan in 1841 during the Sikh Empire. Its sanctum santorum contains many fresco paintings. However, as per Kanwarjit Singh Kang it was constructed by Desa Singh. The temple is currently managed by descendants of Veer Bhan. The site's murals, which depict both Sikh and Hindu themes, are in poor-condition.
