= Jiwan Ram =

Indian artist (died c. 1850)

Jiwan Ram (fl. 1820 – c. 1850) was an Indian artist active in the 19th century. (Note: His name is alternatively transliterated/spelt as 'Jewan Ram' or 'Jivan Ram'.) He was a Delhi-based painter who worked with oil-on-canvas techniques but was a versatile artist who could work in other methods and mediums, such as miniature portraits on board and ivory. He worked as an independent painter without a patron rather than as an employee of the British East India Company, facing no competition from British artists in upper India in this period. He copied the techniques and style of European portraits. He mostly painted portraits of army officers, especially after the Bharatpur war of 1826.

Jiwan Ram had accompanied Lord William Bentinck to Ropar to meet with Maharaja Ranjit Singh of the Sikh Empire in 1831. On 26 October 1831, he was tasked with making a faithful depiction of Ranjit Singh by Bentinck. According to Sohan Lal Suri's Umdat-ut-Tawarikh, during a pause in the meeting Jiwan Ram presented paintings of English women to Ranjit Singh and followed that by preparing an outline sketch of Ranjit Singh on paper. Ranjit Singh paid the painter 100 rupees before dismissing him. In the 1830s, Jiwan Ram was employed by Begam Samru of Sardhana, with around twenty paintings by him adorning the walls of her palace.

In 1834, Jiwan Ram was tasked with preparing a portrait of the Mughal emperor Akbar II. In early 1838, Jiwan Ram shifted to Meerut. However, other sources claim he had shifted to Meerut earlier in around 1827.

Emily Eden, writing on the 13th of February, had the following to say about him during her stay in Meerut with Lord George Auckland and Fanny in 1838:

There is a native here, Juan Kam [Jiwan Ram], who draws beautifully sometimes, and sometimes utterly fails, but his picture of William [Lord William Osborne] is quite perfect. Nobody can suggest an alteration, and as a work of art it is a very pretty possession. It was so admired that Fanny [Emily's sister] got a sketch of G [George, Emily's brother] on cardboard, which is also an excellent likeness.

— Emily Eden, Up the Country, page 94

== Gallery ==
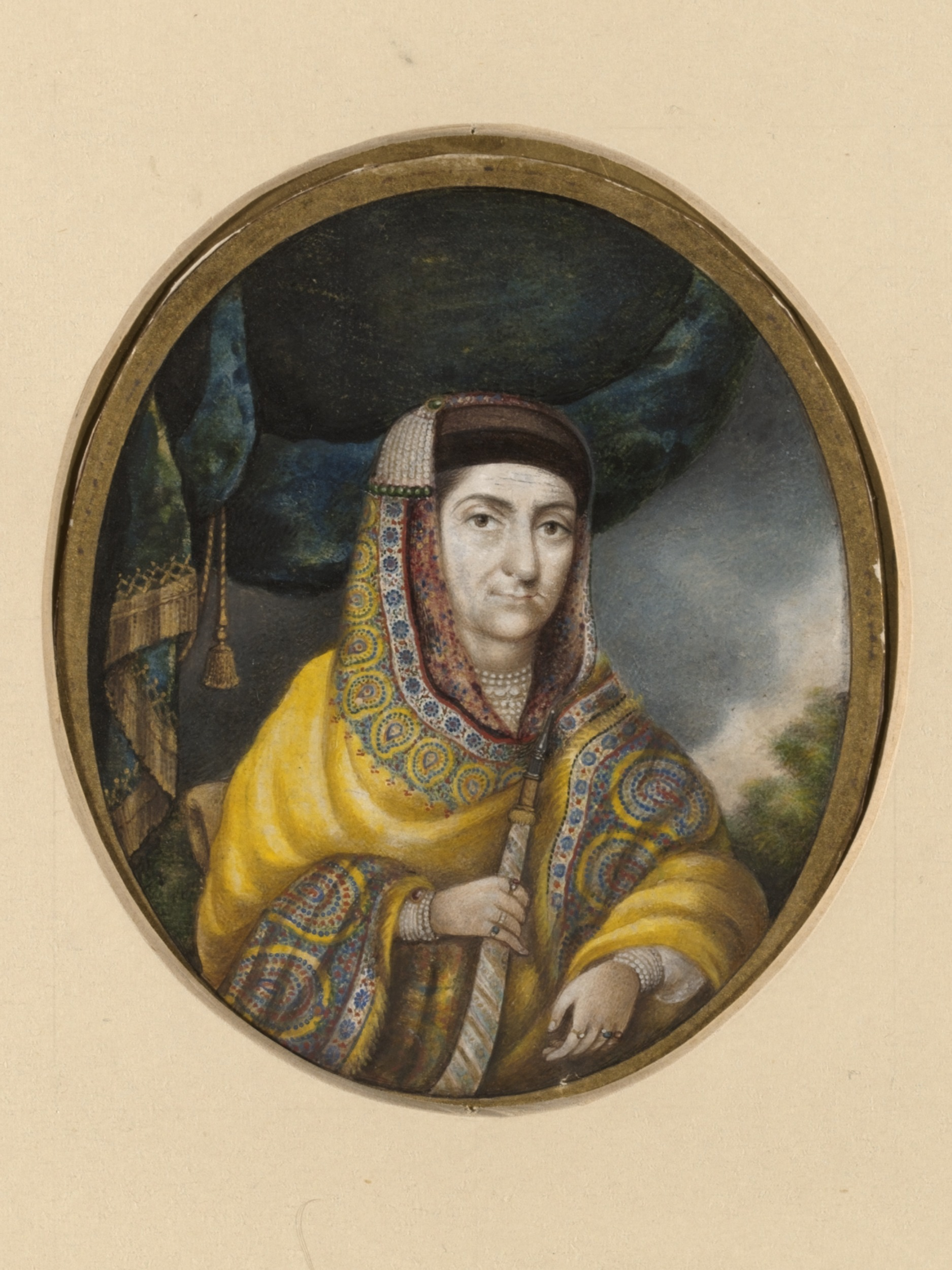
Begam Samru

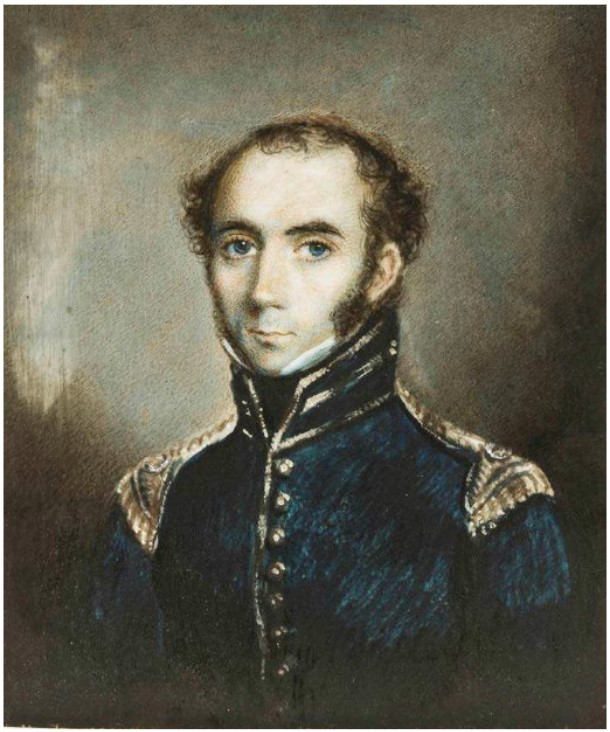
Thomas Theophilus Metcalfe

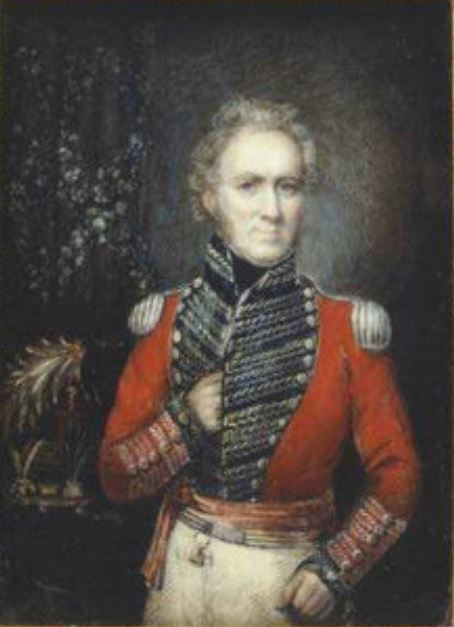
Sir Thomas McMahon

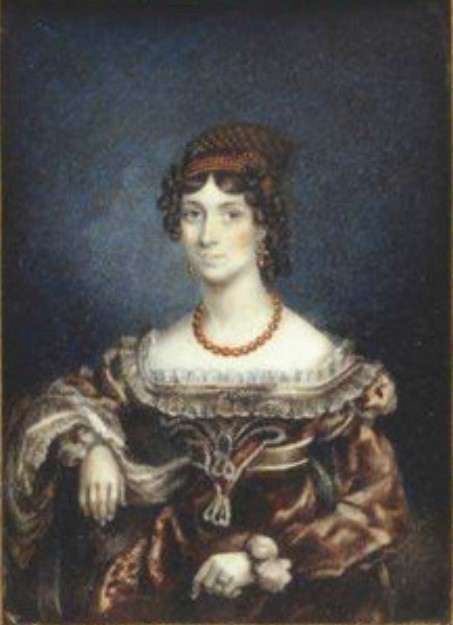
Lady McMahon

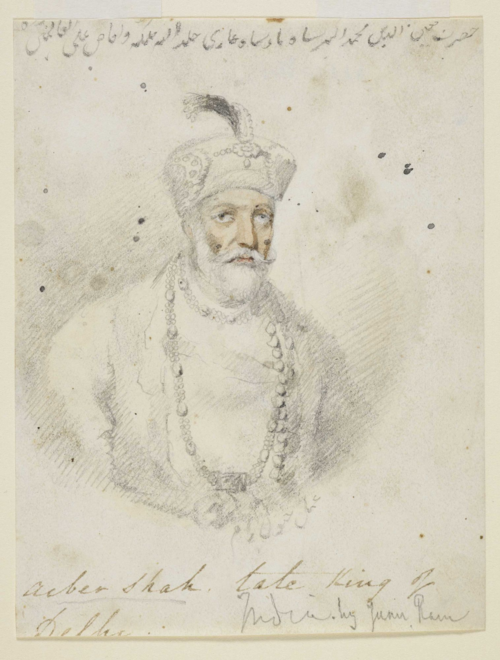
Akbar II

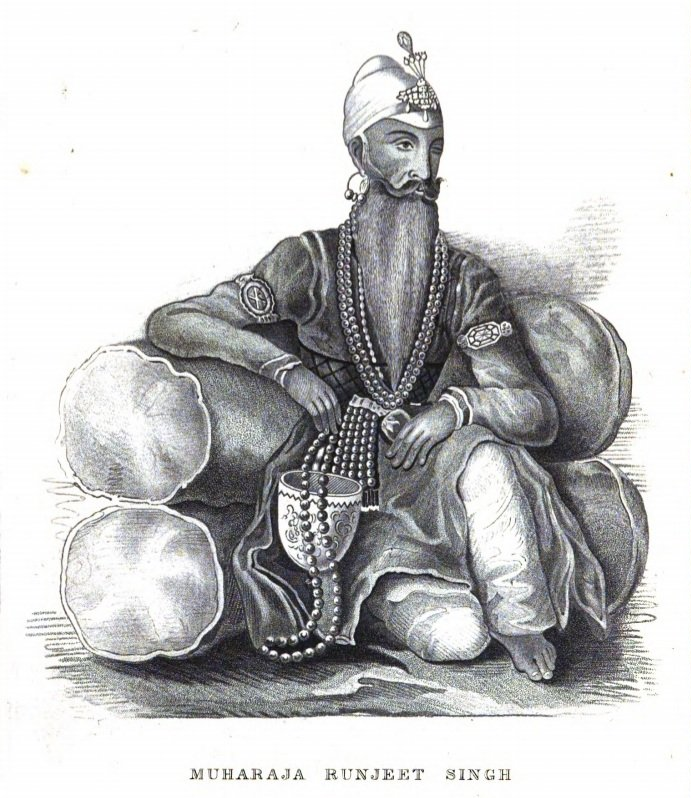
Lithograph of Ranjit Singh, after an original work by Jiwan Ram
