= Zafarnama =

Zafarnama (Persian: ظفرنامه, lit. 'Book of Victory') is the title of a number of literary works:

- Zafarnama or Timurnama, a Persian epic poem by Hatefi about Timur
- Zafarnama (Shami biography), a history of the ruler Timur by Nizam al-Din Shami
- Zafarnama (Yazdi biography), a second history of the ruler Timur's career by the Persian historian Sharaf al-Din Ali Yazdi
  - Garrett Zafarnama, a manuscript of the work, now in Baltimore
- Zafarnamah (Mustawfi), an epic poem by the Persian epic poet Hamdallah Mustawfi
- Zafarnama (letter), a message to the Mughal emperor Aurangzeb from the Sikh leader Guru Gobind Singh
- Zafername, a Turkish satire written in 1870 by Ziya Pasha
- Zafarnamah Ranjit Singh, a chronicle history of Ranjit Singh (1780–1839), compiled by Diwan Amar Nath (c. 1837)

== See also ==
- Book of Victory (disambiguation)
- Safarnama, an 11th-century travel Persian travel book by Nasir Khusraw
