= Zafarnamah Ranjit Singh =

Chronicle of the victories of Maharaja Ranjit Singh

Zafarnamah Ranjit Singh (ظفرنامہ رنجیت سنگھ) is a chronicle of the victories of Maharaja Ranjit Singh (reigned: 1801–1839), written by Diwan Amar Nath. The work covers court politics, administration, revenue, and the military of the period of the Sikh Empire's reign. The text is considered superior in its reliability when compared to other works, such as Sohan Lal Suri’s Umdat-ut-Tawarikh and Bute Shah’s Tawarikh-i-Punjab. Amarnath's position as Bakshi (paymaster) afforded him access to official records and other sources.

== Text ==
The original text was in the Persian language and was composed between 1833 and 1837, covering Maharaja Ranjit Singh's reign up until 1837. It came in four parts. The first part has 41 chapters and is the most important section. It describes events of Singh's reign through 1837. In most cases, these are eyewitness accounts.

Part II contains descriptions of the principal gardens around Lahore. This section was included at Singh's express wish. The third part is mainly a love poem and alludes to episodes in the lives of Mirza Akram Baig and Ilahi Bakhsh. The latter rose to the rank of general in the Sikh artillery. A long poem in the fourth part honors the Maharaja.

== Publication ==
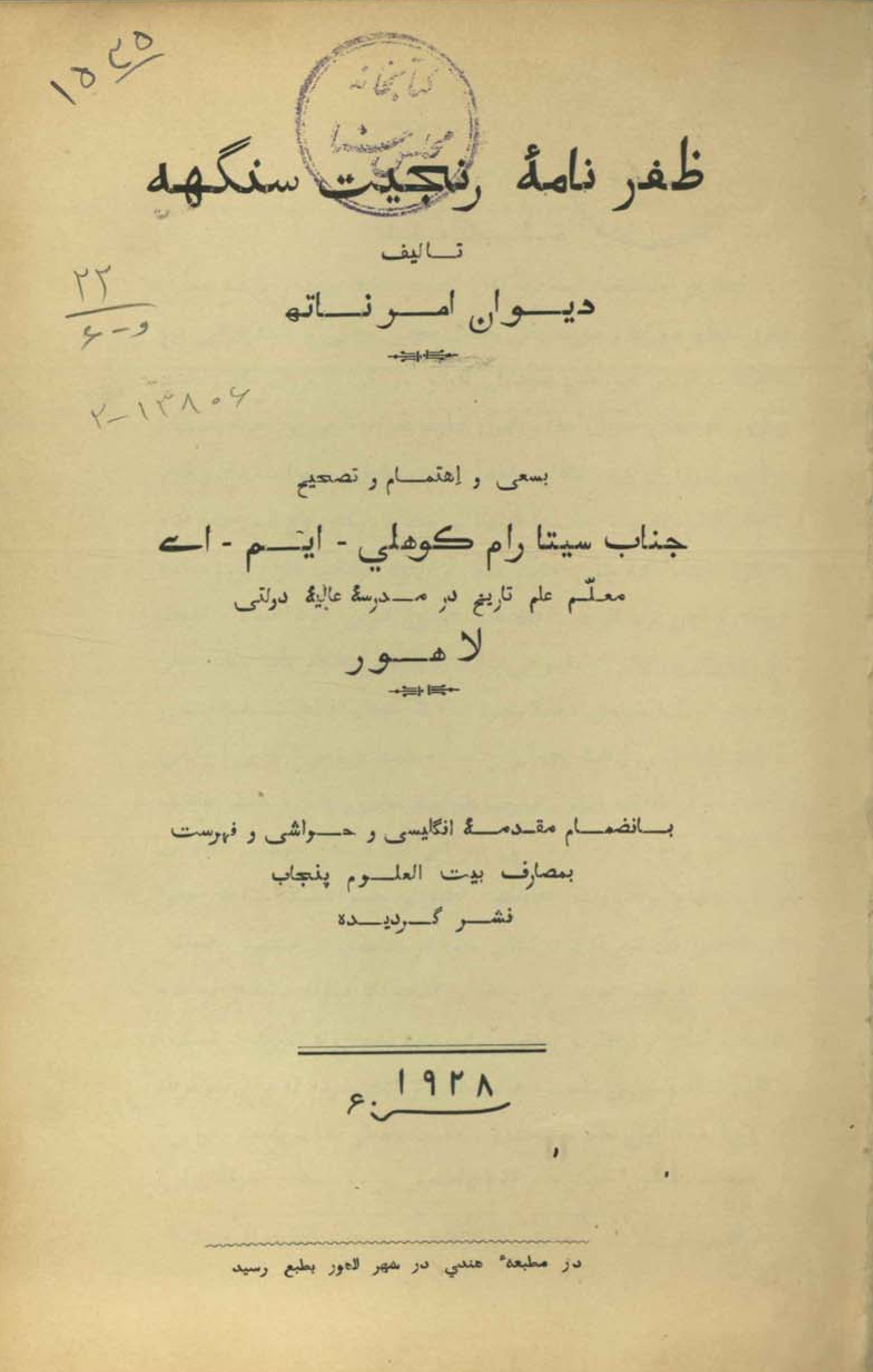
Zafarnamah Ranjit Singh's printed version in Persian, edited by Sita Ram Kohli, Lahore, 1928

The original Persian text was published in 1928 by Professor Sita Ram Kohli in Lahore. A Punjabi text (in the Gurmukhi alphabet) was published 1983 in Patiala, India.

== Sources ==
- Zafarnama e Ranjeet Singh - Divan Amarnath (Farsi)
