= Resident agent =

Resident agent may refer to:

- Registered agent, in United States business law
- FBI Special Agent assigned to a small resident office

== See also ==
- Political Resident or Political Agent, a diplomatic position in the British Empire
