= Bhandari =

Origin
- Language: Sanskrit
- Meaning: Treasurer, keeper of a storehouse
- Region of origin: Indian subcontinent

Bhandari or Bhandary is a surname found in various Hindu castes and communities in India and Nepal. Bhandari means treasurer, keeper of a storehouse. In Punjab, Bhandaris belong to Ahluwalia and Khatri castes. In Nepal, the surname is used by both Matwali and Tagadhari Chhetris, as well as Bahuns.

== Notable people ==
Notable people bearing the name Bhandari or Bhandary include:

- Ajit Bhandari (born 1994), Nepalese footballer
- Amit Bhandari (born 1978), Indian cricketer
- Anup Bhandari (born 1982), Indian writer, director, music director, lyricist, playback singer and actor
- Bidhya Devi Bhandari (born 1961), Nepalese politician, President of Nepal
- Binod Bhandari (born 1990), Nepalese cricketer
- Dalveer Bhandari, (born 1947), judge of the International Court of Justice
- Damodar Bhandari (born 1973), member of 2nd Nepalese Constituent Assembly
- Dhruv Bhandari (born 1985), Indian television actor
- Dil Kumari Bhandari (born 1949), Indian politician, former president of Bharatiya Gorkha Parisangh
- Dinesh Chandra Bhandary (1934–2021), Group Captain in the Indian Air Force, the Vir Chakra awardee
- Gagan Singh Bhandari, Nepalese politician and General
- H. Gopal Bhandary (1952–2019), MLA in Karnataka
- Harry Bhandari (born 1977), Nepalese-born American politician
- Lalit Bhandari (born 1996), Nepalese cricketer
- Madan Bhandari (1951–1993), Nepalese politician and communist leader
- Madho Singh Bhandari, 17th-century Garhwali warrior and administrator
- Mohan Bhandari (1937–2015), Indian film and television actor
- Nar Bahadur Bhandari (1947–2017), Indian politician, Chief Minister of Sikkim from 1979 to 1994 and founder of Sikkim Sangram Parishad
- Rajendra Bahadur Bhandari (born 1975), Nepalese athlete
- Rajendra Bhandari (born 1956), Nepalese poet
- Sabitra Bhandari (born 1996), Nepalese footballer
- Sujan Rai Bhandari, Indian Punjabi historian and author
- Surjan Singh Bhandari, Indian National Security Guards commando
- Tika Bhandari, Nepalese singer

Fictional people bearing the name Bhandari include:

- Sav Bhandari and Alli Bhandari, two main characters and siblings on the Canadian teen drama Degrassi (2001–15)
