= Book of Victory =

Book of Victory may refer to:

- Zafarnama (disambiguation), a title for a number of Persian and Turkish texts which literally means "Book of Victory"
- Sefer Nizzahon Yashan ("The (Old) Book of Victory"), an anonymous 13th century Jewish apologetic
- Sefer Nizzahon (ספר ניצחון), a Jewish work of apologetics written by Yom-Tov Lipmann-Muhlhausen around 1405
