= Ropar Meeting =

1831 Anglo-Sikh meeting in Ropar, Punjab

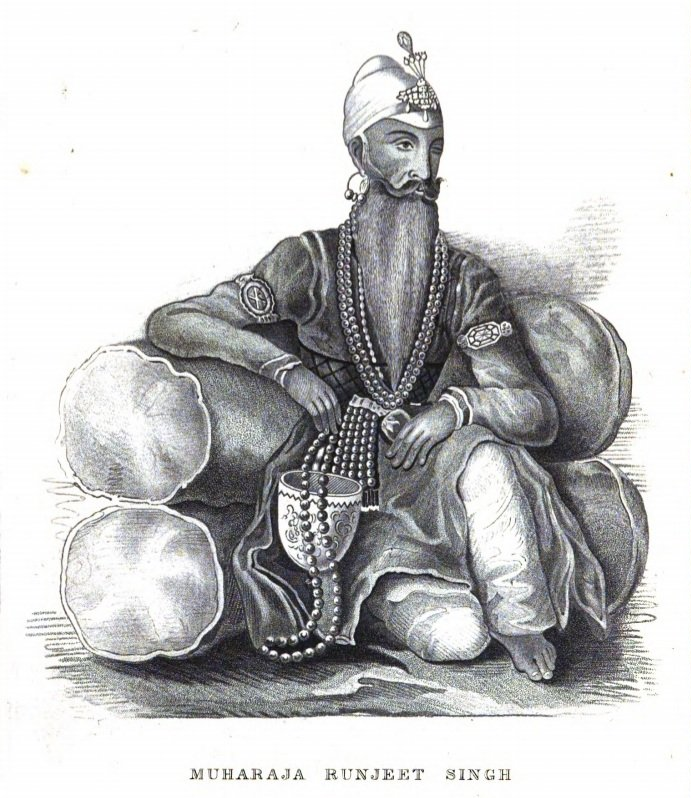
Maharaja Ranjit Singh by Jewan Ram, an artist from Delhi, accompanied the Governor General to Ropar.

The Ropar Meeting in October 1831 was between Maharaja Ranjit Singh and Lord William Bentinck, Governor-General of the East India Company, on the banks of the river Satluj, in a town of the same name. Ranjit Singh's fame had reached its peak, attracting the attention and friendship of sovereigns from afar.

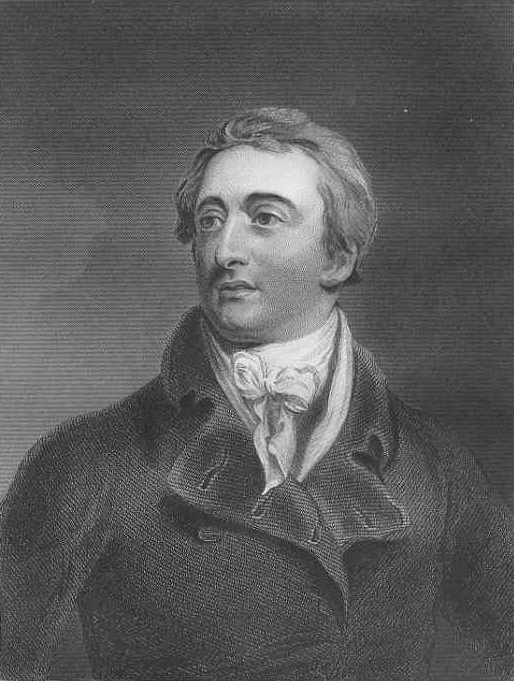
Lord William Bentinck

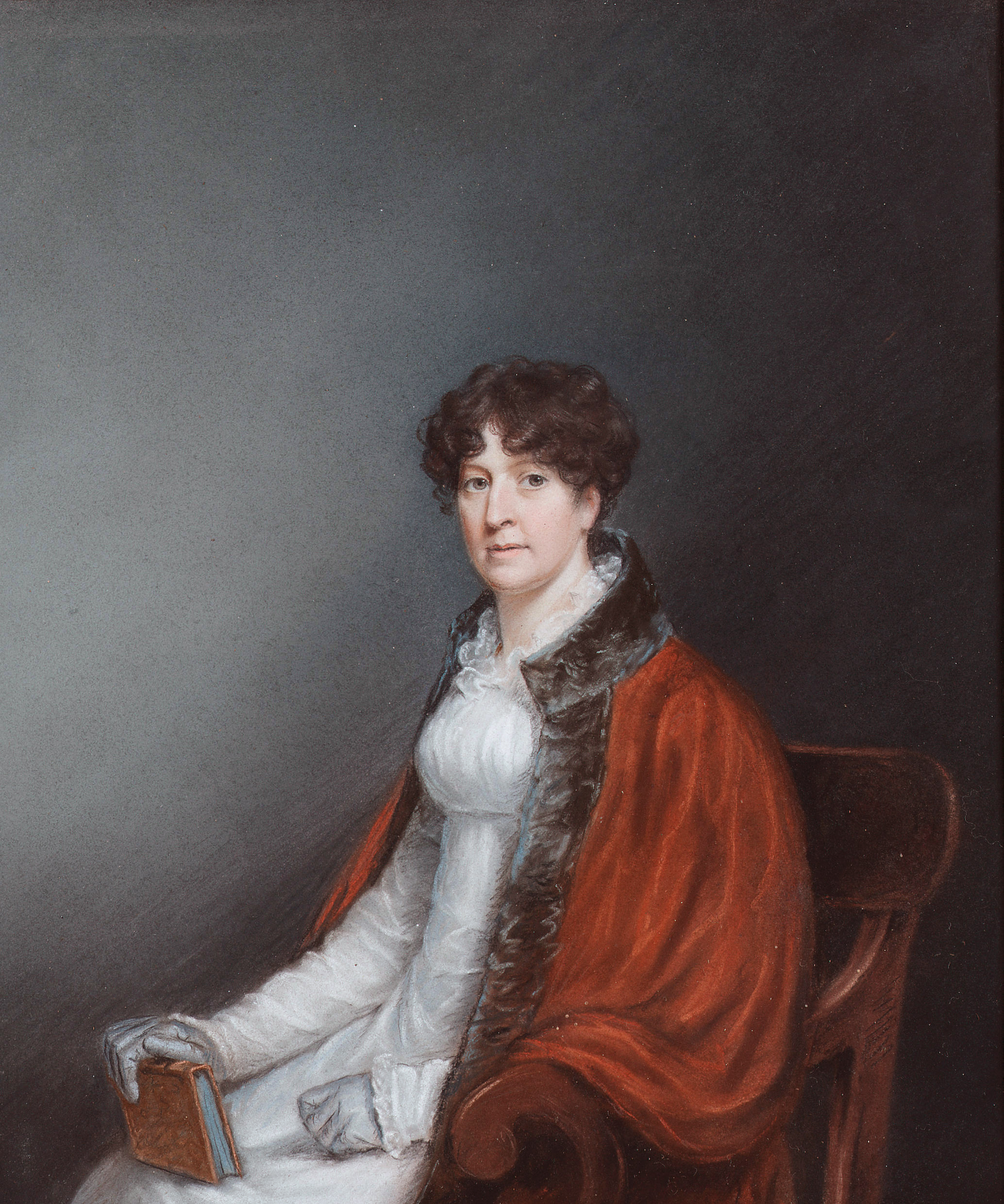
Lady William Cavendish-Bentinck

== Background ==
The Ropar Meeting highlighted the camaraderie between Maharaja Ranjit Singh of the Sikh Empire and the East India Company, which governed Hindustan. The grandeur of the Sikh display prompted a British historian to compare it to the Field of the Cloth of Gold.

The agenda of both powers differed significantly. Ranjit Singh aimed to secure recognition for his son, Kharak Singh's accession, and sought the Company's response to his plans to annex Sindh. At the same time, the Company harboured suspicions that Ranjit Singh had initiated communication with Russia. The East India Company was preparing to court him, recognising him as essential to realising it's expanding aspirations for 'rightful influence' and lucrative commerce. It wanted Ranjit Singh to permit trade access through the Indus and Satluj rivers.

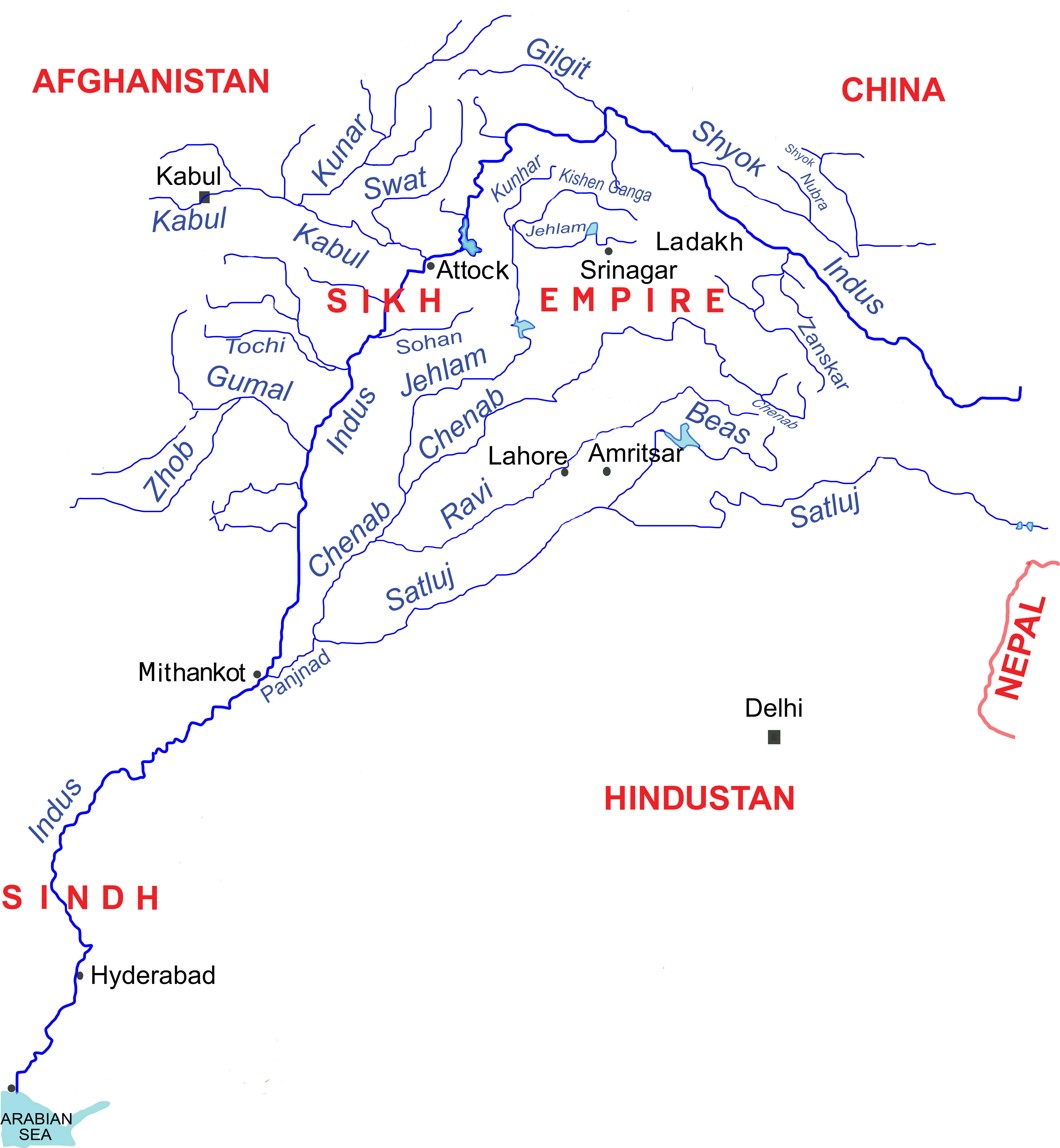
The Satluj defined the border of the Sikh Empire with British East India Company-controlled Hindustan

The Treaty of Amritsar, signed by Ranjit Singh and the Company in 1809, constrained Sikh expansion south of the Satluj and prevented the Company from extending north of it. Sindh, located south of the Satluj, was a matter of interest due to the flow of the Satluj's waters after it left the Punjab. The Satluj joined the Panjnad before reaching the Indus near Mithankot, at which place it left the Sikh Empire and entered Sindh. The Treaty did not address the issue of territorial control along the Satluj's route to the Arabian Sea. The events following the Ropar Meeting showed that the East India Company misinterpreted the 1809 treaty to suit their own convenience.

In the first half of the nineteenth century, the historical land trade route from the plains of Hindustan to Afghanistan ran through the Sikh Empire. Other overland routes were considered unsafe and circuitous. The East India Company aimed to gain waterway access through Sikh territory to facilitate sea trade from Bombay to Attock via the Indus River. From Attock, goods could be transported up the Kabul River. Caravans would carry the goods through the Khyber Pass to Kabul and to markets in Bokhara, Khorasan, and Iraq, providing competition to Russian goods.

== The precursor to the meeting ==
In April 1831, four months before the Ropar Meeting, Ranjit Singh deputed a mission to Shimla to felicitate the Governor-General. The Sikh delegation was the first foreign mission hosted by Lord Bentinck as Governor-General.

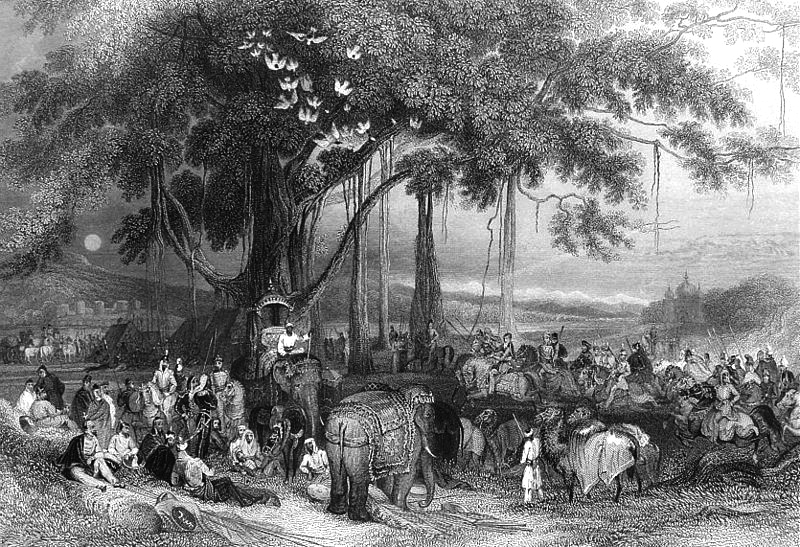
Runjeet Singh and his Suwarree. Maharaja Ranjit Singh, depicted on horseback, stands as the central figure, surrounded by the Sikh cavalry. The foreground features elephants and camels. Ropar, 1831.

Claude Martin Wade, the British agent appointed by the East India Company to oversee Sikh affairs, was tasked by the Governor-General to organize the meeting." All correspondence regarding the proposed meeting was kept confidential because it would have been inappropriate for the Governor-General to appear overly eager to initiate such discussions.

== The meeting ==
William Bentinck and his extensive entourage descended from Shimla in the Himalayas to Ropar on the plains of Punjab. Ropar, a small town situated on the banks of the river Satluj, was under the control of Bhup Singh, a Sikh chieftain loyal to the East India Company.

The parties had determined to encamp on ‘their side’ of the river Satluj. Both parties constructed their bridge of boats to facilitate passage across the river. Commandant Chet Singh supervised the bridge on behalf of the Sikhs and Lieutenant Frederick Mackeson did the same for the Company. The Governor-General reached Ropar on the evening of the 22nd, two days before Maharaja Ranjit Singh did. Maharaja Ranjit Singh arrived on the morning of the 25th to a 101-gun salute.

Invitations were extended, salutes fired, ceremonial exchanges and gift-giving took place, followed by displays of military prowess and feasting with entertainment. Amidst all this, discussions commenced.

Conversations occurred in three languages—Punjabi, Persian, and English. Ranjit Singh conveyed his message in Punjabi to Fakir Azizuddin, who translated it into Persian for Captain Wade. Wade then rendered the communication into English for the Governor-General. Throughout the proceedings, Captain Wade served as interpreter and master of ceremonies.

Alexander Burnes, an East India Company employee, remarked, "The English gentlemen appeared a sorry contrast to the gilded splendor of the Sikhs' elephants." Upon noticing this difference, Ranjit Singh invited the Englishmen to transfer to his lavishly adorned elephants.

== The outcome ==
The Ropar meeting, characterized by Sikh opulence, failed to achieve substantial alignment of interests. "Eastern vanity" clashed with "English pragmatism and sobriety." The only tangible outcome was the Maharaja gaining insights into military science, but at what cost?

The weeklong indulgence resulted in a somewhat unsatisfactory ‘Yaddasht’ (commemorative document) for the Sikh Maharaja. Ranjit Singh's failed attempt to obtain British ‘approval’ for his ambitions concerning Sindh made its conquest a distant dream.

The East India Company acknowledged that Ranjit Singh had ample justification to launch an attack on the amirs of Sindh (Talpur dynasty), who had incited the Balochis to raid into the Sikh territory. It recognised the Maharaja's grievance as legitimate. However, it knew that were the Sikhs to take control of Sindh, Ranjit Singh would always have the power to annoy the Company by closing the navigation of the Indus. The Company checkmated Ranjit Singh by engaging in secret negotiations with the Mirs, employing diplomatic manoeuvres to prevent him from conquering the portion of Sindh that lay well within his sphere of influence. The Indus Navigation Treaty for the opening of the navigation of the rivers Indus and Satluj was signed in 1832.

The Ropar convention drew international attention in the nineteenth century as an event showcasing the grandeur of the Sikh Empire. During his travels, Reverend Joseph Wolff visited the Sikh Empire and astonished the Maharaja by mentioning that he had heard about the Ropar summit while in Bokhara.

Later, Wade disclosed that "the Sikh chiefs were said by Runjeet Singh himself to be averse to the meeting with the British Governor General." The Sikh Sardars believed it beneath the Maharaja's dignity to meet with the Governor-General, as he represented the East India Company rather than the British Crown. They felt that no one but the King of England could match the grandeur of their king.

In hindsight, Ranjit Singh might have considered the advice of his Sardars. The Sardars had eagerly anticipated Lady Bentinck and her companions performing for them, as they had done during the Sikh mission at Shimla earlier that year. Their disappointment was palpable when Lady Bentinck did not dance at Ropar.

== Those in attendance ==
=== Family ===
Son and heir apparent: Kanwar Kharak Singh; Grandson: Prince Nau Nihal Singh.

=== Relatives ===
Sardar Attar Singh Sandhanwalia; Sardar Waswa Singh Sandhanwalia; Sardar Lehna Singh Sandhanwalia.

=== Cis-Satluj states ===
Raja Sangat Singh of Jind; Raja Ajit Singh Ladwa; Bhai Udey Singh of Kaithal.

=== Spiritual guides ===
Bhai Ram Singh; Bhai Gobind Singh; Bhai Sadhu Singh.

=== Administrators ===
Foreign minister: Fakir Azizuddin Deorhiwala: Raja Dhian Singh Dogra. Diwan Moti Ram; Raja Gulab Singh Dogra; Raja Suchet Singh Dogra; Raja Hira Singh Dogra; Jamadar Khushal Singh; Vazir Kaisari Singh; Munshi Kahan Chand; Munshi Lala Sarda Ram; Dewan Sher Ali; Dewan Bhawani Dass; Lala Karam Chand; Lala Nanak Chand; Maharaja’s agent with Captain Wade: Lala Kishen Chand.

=== Khalsaji ===
Commander-in-chief along the Afghan Frontier: Sardar Hari Singh Nalwa; Officers of the Campoo-i-Moalla with General Tej Singh; Colonel Gulab Singh Pahuwindia; Colonel Amir Singh; Colonel Sultan Mohammad; Commandant Chet Singh; General Illahi Bakhsh; Jean-François Allard’s Dragoons; Jean-Baptiste Ventura.

Accompanied by 16,000 cavalry, seven infantry regiments and twenty-one guns and 200 camels; each camel was decorated with coverings of crimson and gold and armed with a swivel (Zamburak).

=== Senior Sardars ===
Raja Fateh Singh Ahluwalia with his son Khalsa Nihal Singh; Sham Singh Attariwala; Nihal Singh Kalianwala; Attar Singh Kalianwala; Jawala Singh of Nurpur; Fateh Singh Mann; Jawand Singh Mokal; Desa Singh Majithia; Lehna Singh Majithia; Sardar Mangal Singh.

=== Treasury ===
Misr Beli Ram; Misr Ram Kishan.

=== Zenana Platoon ===
Commandant; Subedar; Jamadar; Chobdar heading a troupe of 100 girls armed with swords.

=== Others ===
Ghorcharas; Jagirdars; Daftaris; Six Vakils from Sindh (two each, representing the three Mirs).

=== For the British East India Company ===
Governor General: Lord William Bentinck accompanied by his wife, Lady William Bentinck.

=== Army-men/ administrators ===
General Adams; Major-General Ramsay; Major Caldwell; Major Maclachlan; 4th Native Infantry: Dr Murray; Military secretary: Captain Benson; Persian secretary: Henry Prinsep; Political agents (Ludhiana): Captain Claude Martin Wade, (Sabathu): Charles Pratt Kennedy, (Ambala): George Russell Clerk; Henry Miers Elliot; Alexander Burnes; 1st regt. Light Horse Colonel: James Skinner; Brigade of guns: Lieutenant Maidman; Horse artillery: Captain Johnstone; HM 16th Lancers: Colonel Arnold; HM 31st Foot: Colonel Cassidy; 32nd regt. Native Infantry: Major Stacey; 14th regt. N.I. Colonel Little; Lieutenant Frederick Mackeson; J. Ramsay; Lt Col Lockett; Mr Ravenshaw; Bodyguard: Captain Honeywood.

Sixty officers and two khidmatgars.

=== Cis-Satluj rulers ===
The vakils representing the cis-Satluj Rajas and Sardars, eager to accompany Maharaja Ranjit Singh’s mission to Simla earlier this year, were barred from doing so and instructed to return to Ludhiana. The British authorities deliberately kept them away to prevent them from observing the reception given to Ranjit Singh’s delegation.

In 1831, Begum Samru of Sardana submitted a formal request to the Governor-General seeking permission to attend the Ropar meeting. Despite not receiving approval, she decided to go anyway. Her entourage positioned themselves approximately 12 kos behind the Governor-General's camp.; Sardar Bhoop Singh of Ropar was the host for the East India Company.
