= Khulasat-ut-Tawarikh =

1695 Persian-language history chronicle

- Author: Sujan Rai
- Language: Persian
- Subject: History of India
- Genre: non-fiction
- Published: 1695 (manuscript); 1918 (printed)
- Publication place: Mughal Empire

Khulasat-ut-Tawarikh (Persian: خلاصة التواریخ, "Epitome of History") is a Persian language chronicle written by Sujan Rai Bhandari in the Mughal Empire of present-day India. It deals with the history of Hindustan (northern Indian subcontinent), and it also contains details about the contemporary Mughal Empire. Sujan Rai completed the book in 1695 CE, during the reign of Aurangzeb. An insertion about Aurangzeb's death was later added to the original copy by a transcriber.

Alternative transliterations of the book's title include Khulasat-Al-Tavarikh and Khulasatu-t-Tawarikh.

== Authorship and date ==
The author's name is not given anywhere in the actual book, but the transcribers' notes in several manuscripts mention him as Sujan Rai. Some manuscripts appended Bhandari or Batalvi to his name. The title Munshi is also prefixed to his name. One such manuscript calls him the "Munshi of Munshis".

Rai was a Khatri Hindu from Batala. As a young man, he had served as a dabir (secretary) to some nobles. He knew the Hindi, Persian and Sanskrit languages.

Khulasat-ut-Tawarikh was completed in the 40th year of Aurangzeb's reign, corresponding to 1695 CE. Most of the manuscripts contain a brief account of Aurangzeb's death at the end, written abruptly in a small number of lines. This section is believed to be an insertion in an early copy by a transcriber and was repeated in subsequent copies.

== Contents ==
=== Preface ===
The book has a long preface, which contains a list of 27 Persian and Sanskrit historical works used as references:

Persian translations of Sanskrit works

1. Razm-Namah, translation of Mahabharata by Abdul Qadir Badayuni and Sheikh Muhammad Sultan Thanesari; commissioned by Akbar
2. Translation of Ramayana; commissioned by Akbar
3. Translation of Harivamsa, translated by Maulana Tabrezi; commissioned by Akbar
4. Jog Basisht, translation of Yoga Vasistha by Shaikh Ahmad; commissioned by Dara Shikoh
5. Kitab Bhagawat
6. Gulafshan, translation of Singhasan Battisi
7. Translation of Bidhadhar's Rajavali by Nibahuram
8. Translation of Pandit Raghu Nath's Rajatarangini, by Maulana Imad-ud-Din

Persian-language texts

1. Tarikh-i-Mahmud Gaznawi by Maulana Unsuri; about Mahmud of Ghazni
2. Tarikh-i-Sultan Shihab-ud-Din Guri; about Muhammad of Ghor
3. Tarikh-i-Sultan Ala-ud-Din Khalji; about Alauddin Khalji
4. Tarikh-i-Firuzshahi by Maulana A'azz-ud-Din Khalid Khani; about Firuz Shah Tughlaq
5. Tarikh-i-Afaghina by Husain Khan Afghan
6. Zafar Namah by Sharaf-ud-Din Ali Yazdi; about Timur
7. Timur Namah by Hatifi; about Timur
8. Akbar Namah by Abu'l Fazl; about Akbar
9. Tarikh-i Akbar Shahi by Ata Beg Qazwini; about Akbar
10. Akbar Namah by Shaykh Ilahdad Munshi Murtada Khani; about Akbar
11. Tabaqat-i-Akbari by Nizam-ud-Din Ahmad Bakshi; about Akbar
12. Iqbal Namah
13. Jahangir Namah; about Jahangir
14. Tarikh-i-Shah Jahan by Waris Khan, corrected by Sa'd Ullah Khan; about Shah Jahan
15. Tarikh-i-Alamgiri by Mir Muhammad Kazim; about Aurangzeb
16. Tarikh-i-Bahadur Shahi; about Bahadur Shah of Gujarat

Other works

1. Padmavat
2. Tarikh-i-Baburi; about Babur; translated from Turki by Mirza Abad-ur-Rahim Khan Khanan
3. Tarikh-i-Kashmir, translated from the Kashmiri language by Maulana Shah Muhammad Shahabadi

=== Geography of India during Aurangzeb's reign ===
The description of Hindustan in the book:

- People and their customs
- Flora and fauna
- Geography of subahs (provinces) of the Mughal Empire
  - Chief towns and rivers
  - Handicrafts and other products
  - Interesting localities and Buildings
  - Subdivisions (sarkars and mahals), including revenues

The following provinces are covered in the book:

1. Shahjahanbad (Delhi)
2. Akbarabad (Agra)
3. Allahabad
4. Awadh
5. Bihar
6. Bengal
7. Orissa
8. Aurangabad
9. Berar
10. Khandesh
11. Malwa
12. Ajmer
13. Ahmedabad (Gujarat)
14. Thatta
15. Multan
16. Lahore
17. Kashmir
18. Kabul

The descriptions of many provinces, especially those away from the author's native Punjab region, are borrowed from Ain-i-Akbari. The book gives a detailed and original account of Punjab, especially the Lahore subah and the Batala sarkar.

=== Hindu kings of India ===
This part gives an account of the pre-Islamic rulers of India, especially Delhi. It covers kings from the time of the legendary Pandava ruler Yudhishthira to Rai Pithora (Prithviraj Chauhan). The book gives a list of the rulers' names, the period of their reigns and a short account. This section is more of legends than history.

=== Muslim kings of India ===
This part gives details of the Muslim rulers, from Nasir-ud-din Sabuktigin to Aurangzeb. A large portion of this part is borrowed from other works mentioned in the preface. The information unique to Khulasat-i-Tawarikh includes an account of the contest between Aurangzeb and his brothers.

=== Aurangzeb's death ===
Some copies contain an insertion about Aurangzeb's death, inserted by a transcriber. This part mentions that Aurangzeb died in Ahmadnagar, Deccan. The date of his death was Friday, the 28th Zulqada of the year 1118 A.H., three hours after dawn. His age at time of his death is given as 91 years 17 days and 2 hours. The period of his reign is stated as 50 years, 2 months and 28 days.

== Editio princeps ==
In 1918, Archaeological Survey of India's M. Zafar Hasan made available the first editio princeps of the book. He had come across a reference to the book in Syed Ahmed Khan's Asar-us-Sanadid. He then started searching for manuscripts of the book, and consolidated them into a printed edition.

The five manuscripts used by Hasan were the following:

1. A partly worm-eaten, but complete copy. It seems to be comparatively older, since it doesn't contain the description of Aurangzeb's death. It is written in the Shikasta calligraphic style. Its completion is dated to the first year of the reign of Muiz-ud-din Alamgir II. It was procured from Delhi.
2. Written in the Nastaliq calligraphic style. It is dated to year 1864 of the Vikram Samvat (1808-09). It was written in the Jaipur town, during the reign of Jagat Singh II of Jaipur, a vassal of the Mughal Emperor Akbar II. It was procured from Lucknow.
3. It is written in Nastaliq characters. The year of composition is illegible. It was procured from Moradabad.
4. It is written in Nastaliq characters. The copy is worm-eaten, but complete. There is no date of transcription. It was procured from Sardhana.
5. An incomplete copy that ends with the deposition of Emperor Shah Jahan. First three pages are missing. Written in the Shikasta style. It was procured from Delhi.
