= Sujan Rai Bhandari =

17th-century Punjabi historian and author

Sujan Rai Bhandari (fl. 17th century) was a Punjabi historian and author of Khulasat-ut-Tawarikh, among other works.

== Biography ==
Little is known about the life of Sujan Rai. According to his own remarks, he was born in Batala, Punjab, then part of Lahore Subah, and belonged to a Bhandari Khatri family. His writing style suggests that he was a Hindu. Sujan Rai served as a munshī in the administration of Aurangzeb, and also claimed to have travelled to Kabul and Thatta.

== Works ==
His most prominent work is Khulasat-ut-Tawarikh, completed during 1695–6. It is a general history of Indian subcontinent starting from earliest times to the accession of Aurangzeb in 1658, and is a significant source for the history of Punjab. His other works include Khulasat al-inshā and Khulasat al-makātīb, dealing with Insha. They were compiled in 1690s and are so far unpublished. Khulasat al-sīāq, a work on arithmetic written during 1703–4, is also attributed to him.

== Sources ==
- Ansari, N. H. (1989). "Bhandārī". In Yarshater, Ehsan (ed.). Encyclopædia Iranica. Vol. IV/2: Behruz–Bibliographies II. London and New York: Routledge & Kegan Paul. pp. 193–194. ISBN 978-0-71009-125-3.
- Shafi, Mohammed (1997). "Sud̲j̲ān Rāy Bhandārī". In Bosworth, C. E.; van Donzel, E.; Heinrichs, W. P. & Lecomte, G. (eds.). The Encyclopaedia of Islam, Second Edition. Volume IX: San–Sze. Leiden: E. J. Brill. pp. 762–763. doi:10.1163/1573-3912_islam_sim_7122. ISBN 978-90-04-10422-8.
