= Sohan Lal Suri =

Punjabi historiographer

Lala Sohan Lal Suri
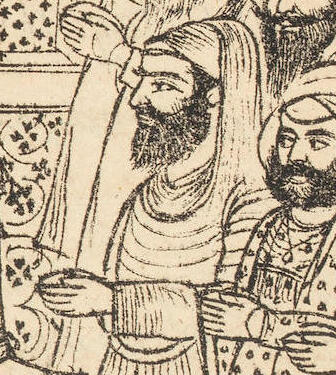
- Lala Sohan Lal Suri, official court-chronicler and historian of the Sikh Empire, detail from a lithograph, Umdat-ut-Tawarikh (vol. II), Albert Press, Lahore, 1886
- Died: 1852
- Employer: Lahore Durbar of the Sikh Empire
- Known for: Court chronicler of the Sikh Empire
- Notable work: Umdat-ut-Tawarikh

Sohan Lal Suri (died 1852) was a Punjabi historiographer, who specialized in the period of the Sikh Empire. Sohan was the son of Lala Ganpat Rai, the waqai navis or court chronicler of the Sukerchakia Misl and later Sikh Empire. Sohan Lal inherited the position from his father in 1811 and served at the court of Lahore till after the death of Ranjit Singh in 1839. The period covered by him as a court chronicler begins in 1812 and includes the Anglo-Sikh War. His magnum opus was the Umdat-ut-Tawarikh.

== Background and early life ==
Very little is known of his early life. Sohan Lal was born in a Hindu Khatri family from the Pothwar region of Punjab, now in Pakistan. The family was said to be descended from Raja Khokhar Anand, a 12th-century ruler of Lahore. His family was allegedly of the Khukhrain gotra or biradari (clan), with Suri being a sub-clan. He was the son of Ganpat Rai Suri and grandson of Lala Hukumat Rai Suri.

His father, Lala Ganpat Rai, had served as a Munshi for three generations of the Sukerchakia Misl. He gained employment under Sardar Charat Singh in 1771 and on his death, served under Maha Singh and then in Ranjit Singh's court till 1811–12.

== Career ==
Sohan inherited his father's position in 1811. Suri was well-educated in mathematics, numerology, astronomy, and well-versed in languages like Persian, Arabic, and Sanskrit. Besides his popular works, he also produced a genealogical table of his family up to 1836, a funeral oration on the death of his father, an account of the chiefs of the cis-Sutlej states, a description of English institutions, an account of his meeting with General Claude Martin Wade, and copies of letters and testimonials.

The sources he used to compose his works includes notes he inherited from his father, his own first-hand knowledge, and other works available to him, such as the Khulasat-ut-Tawarikh by Sujan Rai Bhandari.

Fakir Azizuddin introduced Sohan Lal Suri to General Claude Martin Wade as Ranjit Singh's court chronicler and the Sikh court's historian. Ranjit Singh permitted Wade's request to have Sohan travel to Ludhiana, where it is said that Sohan read-out excerpts from his Umdat-ut-Twarikh to Wade twice-a-week. Sohan also presented to Wade a copy of the Twarikh work, which is still preserved in the Royal Asiatic Society Library in London. According to Kapur Singh, Sohan Lal Suri was working for the British as a spy in the Sikh court whom was paid an annual salary which was later commuted to a pension.

== Later life ==
After the annexation of the Sikh Empire in 1849, Sohan Lal Suri was bestowed with jagir (estate) grant of 1,000 rupees per annum in Manga. The village of Manga in the Amritsar District, which was the estate of Lala Sohan Lal Suri during Maharaja Ranjit Singh's reign, was confirmed, in 1850, for life by the East India Company following the annexation of Punjab. Sohan Lal Suri likely lived out his remaining years there. Sohan Lal Suri had a son named Lala Mul Chand Suri and a grandson named Lala Harbhagwan Das Suri.

== Works ==
=== Umdat-ut-Tawarikh ===
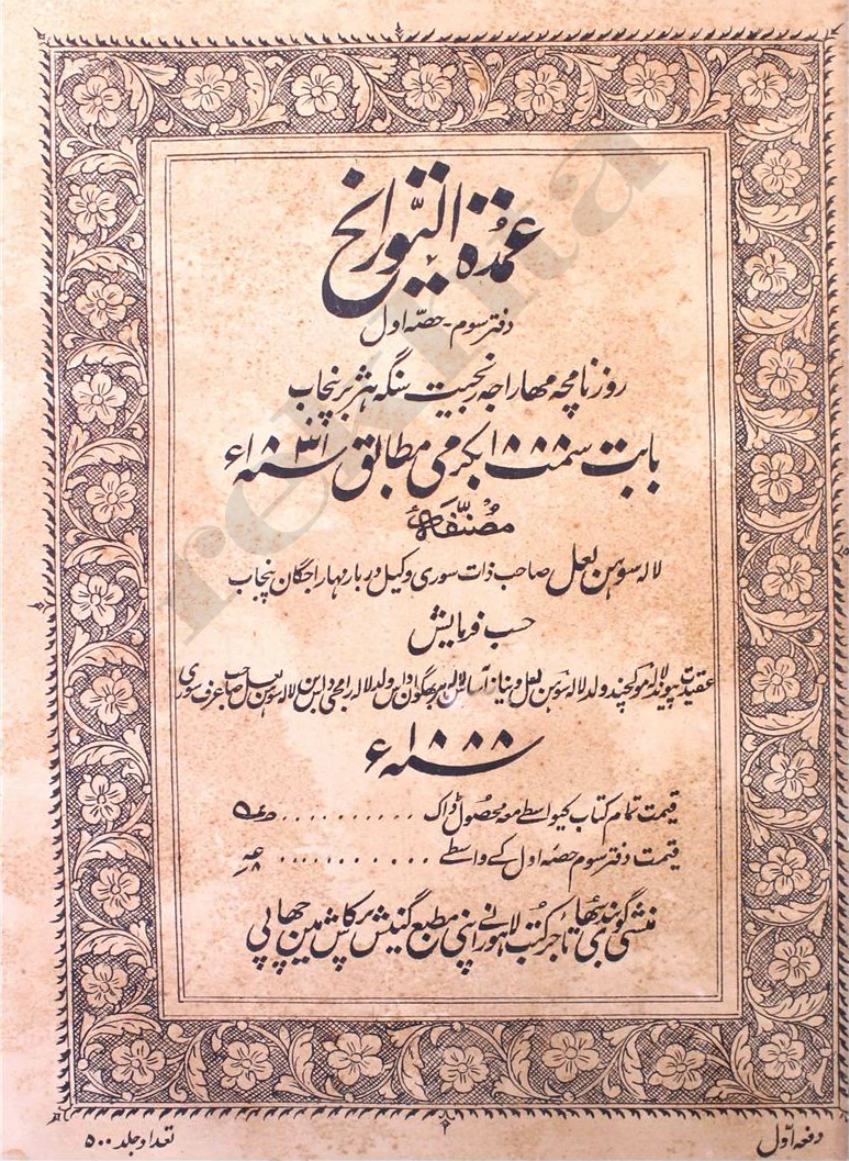
Title page of the Umdat-ut-Tawarikh by Lala Sohan Lal Suri, lithograph, 1888

The Umdat-ut-Twarikh originally consisted of around 7,000 pages in-total written in shikasta running Persian script. Sohan Lal penned events at the Lahore Durbar in Persian, contiguous with the rule of Maharaja Ranjit Singh. The work, in five daftars or volumes, was translated into English in the twentieth century by Vidya Sagar Suri, his descendant.

=== Ibratnamah ===
This is a small work in verse that is an account of the murders of Maharaja Sher Singh and Raja Dhian Singh by the Sandhawalia sardars in September 1843.

=== Selections from Daftar II ===
A manuscript that contains brief accounts on courtiers, rajas, diwans, learned men, saints, and ascetics living in the year 1831.

=== Other works ===
He allegedly authored mathematical, geometric, and astronomical treatises.
