= Political Resident =

In the British Empire a Political Resident or Political Agent was the incumbent of an official diplomatic position involving both consular duties and liaison function.

A Consul or Consul-General has largely consular functions, such as looking after British business persons abroad. A Political Resident or Political Agent, on the other hand, not only has consular duties but also has political contacts with the rulers of native states, such as the Nizam, Nawabs, Maharajas, sultans, sheikhs and rajas. With the end of the British Empire this distinction became redundant because the Political Resident or Political Agent was no longer relevant.

== See also ==
- Resident (title)
- Political officer (British Empire)
- Persian Gulf Residency
- Residencies of British India
