= Umdat-ut-Tawarikh =

Sikh historical chronicle

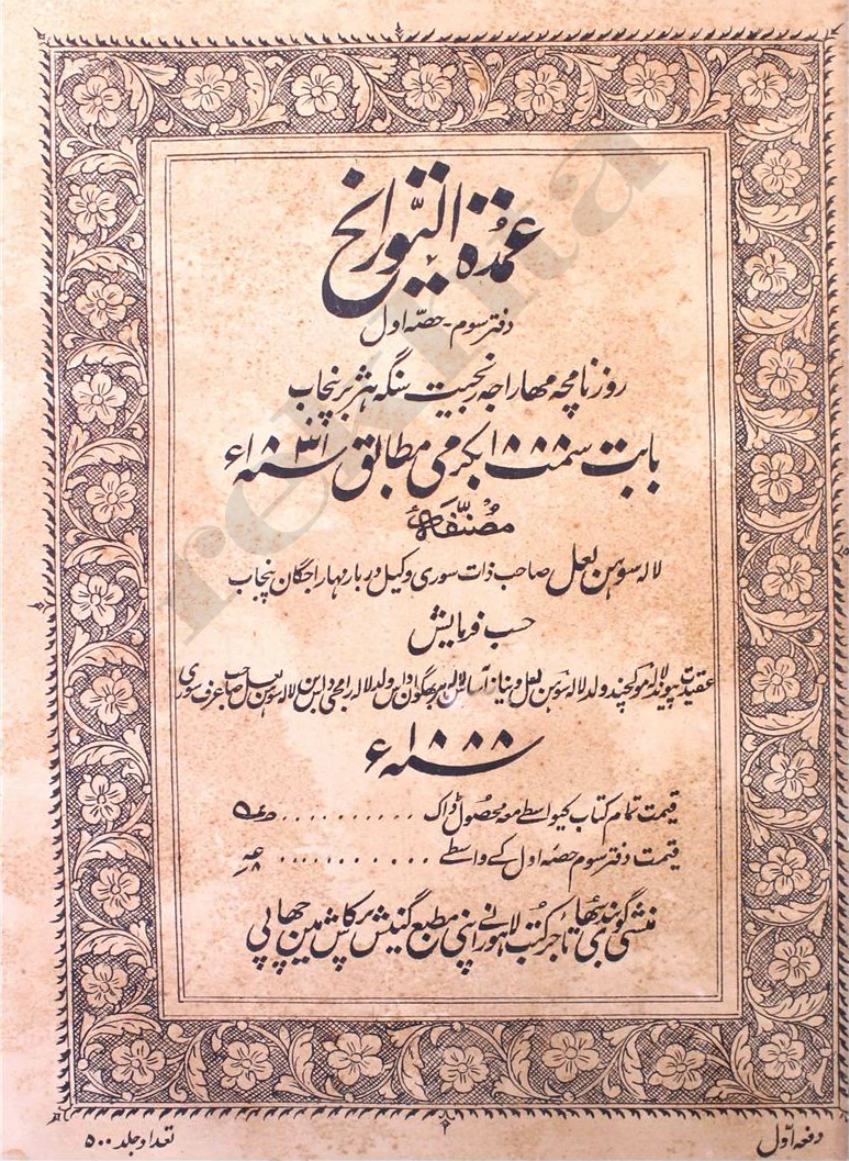
Title page of the Umdat-ut-Tawarikh by Lala Sohan Lal Suri, lithograph, 1888

The Umdat-ut-Tawarikh is a Sikh historiographical work by Sohan Lal Suri covering the period of the Sikh gurus to the Sikh Empire. The Umdat-ut-Twarikh originally consisted of around 7,000 pages in-total written in shikasta running Persian script. Sohan Lal penned events at the Lahore Durbar in Persian, contiguous with the rule of Maharaja Ranjit Singh. The work, in five daftars or volumes, was translated into English in the twentieth century by Vidya Sagar Suri, his descendant.

== Structure ==
- Daftar 1: History of the Sikhs from the birth of Guru Nanak in 1469 to 1771.
- Daftar 2 Charts the career of Charat Singh and the rise of Ranjit Singh and covers the period from 1772 to 1830.
- Daftar 3 Is divided into five parts and covers the events in the court of Lahore from 1831 to 1839, the year Ranjit Singh died.
- Daftar 4 Is divided into three parts and covers significant events in the Sikh Court from 1839 to 1845. A part of the narrative from this period is missing. After the First Anglo-Sikh War, Sohan Lal Suri gave the account of the wars from 29 September 1845 to 20 September 1846 between the ‘Singhs’ and the ‘glorious Sahibs’ to Herbert Benjamin Edwardes who served at the Punjab Frontier to peruse. Edwardes did not return the records. As there was no copy, this period is missing from the Umdat-ut-tawarikh, the Lahore court chronicle.
- Daftar 5 This volume deals with the period commencing in 1845 till 1849, the year the Sikh Empire was annexed by the East India Company.

== Legacy ==
Claude Martin Wade was appointed the political agent by the East India Company and was ordered to report the proceedings of Maharaja Ranjit Singh's court. In speaking of the indigenous work, he said—

"Allowing for the partiality of the writer’s views and opinions, as regards the fame and credit of his patron, yet, as a record of dates and a chronicle of events, tested by a minute comparison with other authorities, and my own personal investigations into its accuracy during a residence of seventeen years among the Sikhs, I am enabled to pronounce it, in those two respects, as a true and faithful narrative of Runjeet Singh’s eventful life."

According to Bayly, a twenty-first-century specialist in global and Indian history, Sohan Lal Suri's Umdat-ut-Tawarikh gives ‘a good impression of the density of information coming in to Ranjit Singh…’.

== Manuscripts ==
The original manuscript of the Umdat-ut-Twarikh is lying somewhere in the disorganized and poorly kept collection of the Punjab Archives in Lahore. Another early copy is with the Royal Asiatic Society Library in London.

== Printing and translation ==
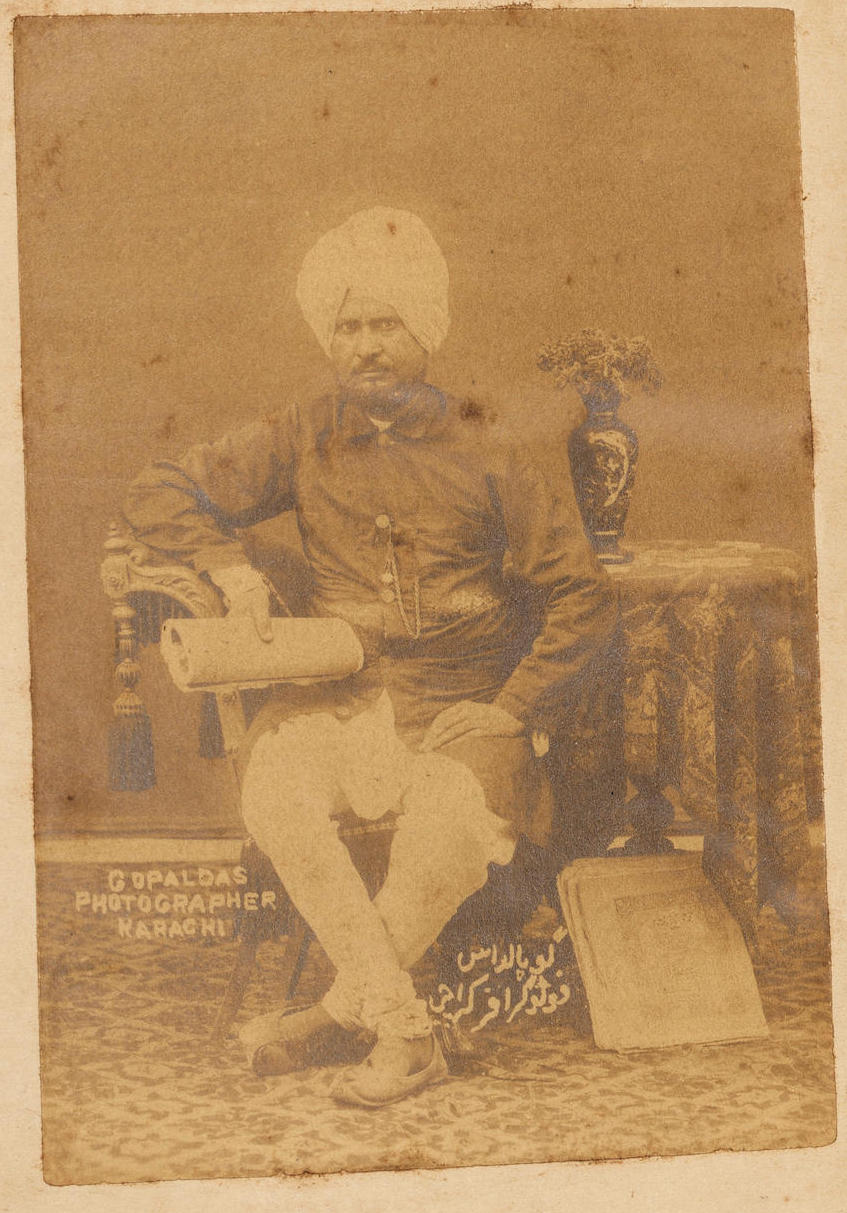
Photograph of Lala Harbhagwan Das Suri, grandson of Lala Sohan Lal Suri, taken by the photographer Gopaldas, Karachi, ca.1886

The Persian work was published under the orders of Sohan Lal Suri's son and grandson, Mul Chand and Har Bhagwan Das, by the Albert Press in Lahore in 1886. This publishing was scribed by Narani (Nurayni) Das, resident of Salkut. A colophon by the scribe gives the date of 17 September 1886. For the work, a subsidy was bestowed from the Punjab University College of Lahore of which G. W. Leitner was the registrar. Only 500 copies were lithographed. This print was to be translated into English by R. C. Temple.

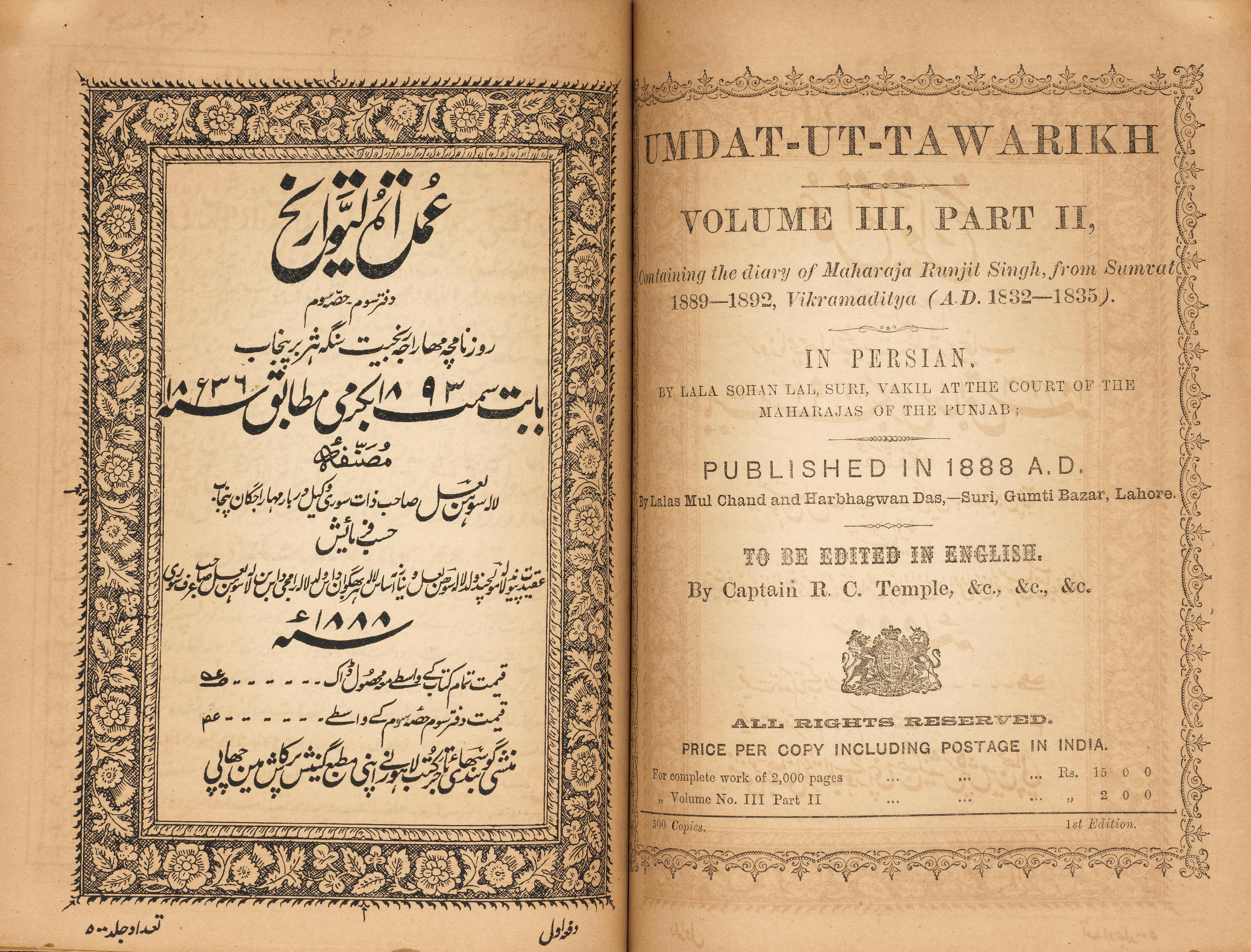
Title-page of volume III, part II of the Umdat-ut-Tawarikh of Sohan Lal Suri, published under the orders of Mul Chand and Har Bhagwan Das, Gumti Bazar, Lahore, 1888

The 1880s publishing of the work, consisting of around 2,000 pages in-total, was subdivided as follows:

- Volume I: from the birth of Guru Nanak in 1469 to Ahmad Shah Durrani in 1771 (184 pages);
- Volume II: from Charat Singh to the rise of Maharajah Ranjit Singh until 1830 (400 pages);
- Volume III (consisting of five parts): on events in the court of Lahore, such as the birth of Duleep Singh, Lord Auckland's interview, and the death of Ranjit Singh, from 1831 to 1839 (930 pages);
- Volume IV: on events between 1839 and 1845, covering the accession of Kharak Singh to the throne and the First Anglo-Sikh war (230 pages);
- Volume V: on events between 1845 and 1849, the Second Anglo-Sikh war and disintegration of the Sikh Empire, when the Punjab was annexed by the British (200 pages);
- Appendix to Volumes I & II: a sketch of the rise of the Sikhs up until 1825 (60 pages).

Eventually, the work was translated into English by Vidya Sagar Suri, a descendant of the original author, in the 20th century.
