= Claude Martin Wade =

- Born: 3 April 1794; Bengal Presidency, British India
- Died: 21 October 1861 (aged 67); Bath, Somerset, England
- Occupation: Soldier
- Spouse: Jane Selina Nicholl
- Parent(s): Lt. Col. Joseph Wade and Maria Ross

Colonel Sir Claude Martin Wade CB (3 April 1794 – 21 October 1861) was a British soldier who was Agent to the Governor-General for the Affairs of the Punjab and North-West Frontier, 1823–1840. He managed relations between the British and important rulers in India such as Maharaja Ranjit Singh and Shah Shuja, King of Afghanistan. He was one of the first to force the Khyber Pass.

== Career ==
Claude Martin Wade was born in 1794 to Joseph Wade and his wife in Bengal. He was named after his godfather, Major General Claude Martin. The said General died in 1800 leaving his immense fortune, in the manner of a childless man, to charity. Wade had two children. A son named, Claude Fitzroy Wade, a barrister, and a daughter, Ellen Maud Welman.

Wade was appointed a cadet in the Bengal army in 1809 and became an Ensign posted to the Bengal Native Infantry in 1812 He served in Bundelkund in 1812, and in operations in Sindia and Holkar in 1815. He fought in the Third Maratha War between 1817 and 1819. In 1823 he was diplomatic agent at Ludhiana, taking over from a Captain Murray. In 1835, Claude was in charge of relations with Maharaja Ranjit Singh. Col. C.M. Wade was the master of ceremonies at the Ropar Meeting that he organised between the Maharaja and the governor-general of the East India Company. He was able to win the confidence of Maharaja Ranjit Singh through mutual regard and understanding which greatly helped to change the relations between the two Governments from undisguised hostility to close friendship and accord. Wade was awarded the Auspicious Star of the Punjab by the Maharaja on account of this relationship.

In the 1830s, the British decided to replace Dost Mohammad Khan by Shah Shuja on the Kabul throne. A tripartite Treaty of 1838 was drafted between the British, Shah Shuja and Ranjit Singh. The Lahore ruler signed the treaty on 26 June 1838, but the Governor-General, Lord Auckland, before signing it sent the draft to Shah Shuja at Ludhiana through Macnaughten, Wade and Mackeson. The Shah objected to various articles, but he secured various assurances from the British Government, and on 17 July 1838, the mission left Ludhiana with the signed treaty. Shah Shuja raised his contingent of 6,000 at Ludhiana, and through the combined help of the British and the Sikhs he was placed on his ancestral throne on 7 August 1839.

Claude's special mission in 1838 to Peshawur to join the Sikh army with Shahzada Timoor (Shah Shuja's son) meant he was (amongst) the first to force the Khyber Pass. In 1845 he married Jane Selina, eldest daughter of Captain Thomas Nicholl of the Bengal Horse Artillery. She and their son Claude FitzRoy (barrister) survived him. In 1848 he had his last appointment as political agent for the vast area of Malwa

In 1839, Wade was knighted and made a Companion of the Most Honourable Military Order of the Bath.

== See also ==
Claude Martin
