= Punjab Right to Service Act, 2011 =

Right to Service Act Punjab

The Punjab Right to Service Act, 2011 is an Act of Government of Punjab, India that came into force on 20 October 2011. The objective of this Act is to deliver services to the people of the state within time limits. This Act was enacted on the recommendations of Punjab Governance Reforms Commission.

== Services covered under Punjab Right to Service Act, 2011 ==
The Government of Punjab has notified 351 services under Punjab Right to Service Act, 2011 vide notification no: 5/27/2014-2GR-2/425953/1 dated 02.03.2015 and no. 5/27/2014-2GR-2 (PF)/668042/1 dated 15.01.2016.Initially number of services covered under the Act was 206 which was increased to 351 vide above mentioned notification no dated 15-01-2015. As per Act delivery of these services has been made time bound. In case of delay the concerned official(s) will be answerable to the authorities and affected person(s) may appeal to the designated officers/Appellate Authority.For this purpose First Appellate Authority, Second Appellate Authority has also been notified.

=== List of Services and Appellate Authorities ===
Services and Appellate Authorities
Serial number	Department	Service	Given Time Limit (working days)	Designated Officer	First Appellate Authority	Second Appellate Authority
1.	Revenue	Certified Copies of all manual documents at Fard Centre level i.e. Record of Rights (Jamabandi), Girdawri, mutation, etc.	1 day	Duty Patwari or ASM of the Fard Centre	S D M of the Concerned Sub-Division	District Deputy Commissioner
2.	Revenue	Certified Copies of all manual documents at village level if the number of pages <5	2 day	Patwari	S D M of the concerned Sub- Division	District Deputy Commissioner
3.	Revenue	Certified copies of all manual documents at village level if number of pages is 6-14)	3 days	Patwari	S D M of the concerned Sub- Division	District Deputy Commissioner
4.	Revenue	Certified Copies of all manual documents at village level if the number of pages sought >15	7 days	Patwari	S D M of the concerned Sub- Division	District Deputy Commissioner
5.	Revenue	Demarcation of land	45 days (where police help is required within 15 days from the date of orders of Concerned District Magistrate for such police help)	Circle Revenue Officer	S D M of the Concerned Division	District Deputy Commissioner
6.	Revenue	Registration of all kinds of documents i.e. sale deed, lease deed, GPA, Partnership Deed etc.	1 day	Sub-Registrar or Joint Sub Resitrar (in case of sub Tehsils)	S D M of the Concerned Division	District Deputy Commissioner
7.	Revenue	Certified Copies of all kinds of registered documents	7 days	Sub-Registrar or Joint Sub Resitrar (in case of sub Tehsils)	S D M of the Concerned Division	District Deputy Commissioner
8.	Revenue	Attestation of uncontested Mutation	45 days	Circle Revenue Officer	S D M of the Concerned Division	District Deputy Commissioner
9.	Revenue	Private Partition of Land (mutual consent of landowners)	30 days	Circle Revenue Officer	S D M of the Concerned Division	District Deputy Commissioner
10.	Revenue	Issue of Income Certificate	15 days	Tehsildar of the concerned Sub-Division	S D M of the Concerned Division	District Deputy Commissioner
11.	Revenue	Kandi/Sub Mountainous area/ Border area/ Bet area/ Hindu Dogra/ Community/ Natural heir/dependent Certificate	15 days	Tehsildar of the concerned Sub-Division	S D M of the Concerned Division	District Deputy Commissioner
12.	Revenue	Issuance of Non encumbrance Certificate	3 days	Sub-Registrar/ Joint Sub- Registrar	S D M of the Concerned Sub- Division	District Deputy Commissioner
13	Health	Certified Copies of Birth/ Death Certificates Corporation Cities	2 days for current year and 5 days for previous years	Local Registrar, Birth and Death of the concerned Municipal Corporation	S D M of the Concerned Sub- Division	District Deputy Commissioner
14	Health	Certified Copies of Birth/ Death Certificates- MC Towns	2 days for current year and 5 days for previous years	Local Registrar, Birth and Death of the concerned Municipal Corporation	S D M of the Concerned Sub- Division	District Deputy Commissioner
15	Health	Certified Copies of Birth/ Death Certificates- Rural Areas	2 days for current year and 5 days for previous years	Local Registrar, Birth and Death of the concerned District	S D M of the Concerned Sub- Division	District Deputy Commissioner
16a.	Health	Late Registration of Birth & Death and issue of Certificate (after 30 days but within one year)(Urban/Rural)	15 days i) 4 days Time for referring case to S M O / District Registrar by the Concerned Registrar. ii) 7 days Time for SDM/ or Deputy Registrar to pass orders and send back case to the Concerned Registrar,as the case may be. iii) 4 days Time for Registration and Issuance of Certificate by the Concerned Registrar.	Concerned Registrar/District Registrar	S D M / Additional Deputy Commissioner (General)	Deputy Commissioner of the Concerned District
16b.	Health	Late Registration of Birth & Death and issue of Certificate (after one year)(Urban/Rural)	30 days i) 4 days Times for referring case to District Registrar by the Concerned Registrar. ii) 4 days Time for referring case to S D M by the District Registrar. iii) 15 days Time for Verification/pass orders and send back case to District Registrar by the office of Sub Divisional Megistrate iv) 3 days' Time for sending back case to the concerned registrar by District Registrar v) 4 days time for Issuance of Certificate by the Concerned Registrar	Concerned Registrar/District Registrar	S D M / Additional Deputy Commissioner (General)	Deputy Commissioner of the Concerned District
17.	Health	Birth Certificate (Name Entry and New Birth Certificate)	7 days	Concerned Local/District Registrar as applicable	S D M / Additional Deputy Commissioner (General)	Deputy Commissioner the Concerned District
18.	Health	Correction of entry in Birth and Death Certificate	15 days	Concerned Local/District Registrar as applicable	S D M / Additional Deputy Commissioner (General)	Deputy Commissioner the Concerned District
19.	Health	Copies of the Post Mortem Report	3 days	Senior Medical Officer of the Concerned Civil Hospital or Medical Superintendent in case of Medical College	S D M / Additional Deputy Commissioner (General)	Deputy Commissioner the Concerned District
20.	Health	Copy of interim Medico Legal Report	2 days	Senior Medical Officer I/C of District Hospital or Sub Divisional Hospital of Community Health Centre/Primary Health Centre or Medical Superintendent of the Medical College	S D M / Additional Deputy Commissioner Concerned Sub-Division	Additional Deputy Commissioner (General) / Deputy Commissioner the Concerned District
21.	Health	Copy of Complete Medico Legal Report	7 days (if expert opinion or investigation is complete	Senior Medical Officer I/C of District Hospital or Sub Divisional Hospital of Community Health Centre/ Primary Health Centre or Medical Superintendent of the Medical Colleges	Sub Divisional Magistrate of the Concerned Sub-Division	Additional Deputy Commissioner (General) /Deputy Commissioner of the Concerned District
22.	Health	Issuance of Disability Certificate Obvious Disability (Loco Motor, Blindness)	4 days	Senior Medical Officer I/C of District Hospital or Sub Divisional Hospital of Community Health Centre or Medical Officer I/C of Primary Health Centre.	Sub/Divisional Magistrate of the Concerned Sub Division	Additional Deputy Commissioner (General)/Deputy Commissioner of the Concerned District
23.	Health	Issuance of Single Disability Certificate	7 days	Senior Medical Officer I/C District Hospital Sub Divisional Hospital & Community Health Centre	Sub Divisional Magistrate of the Concerned SubDivision	Additional Deputy Commissioner (General)/Deputy Commissioner of the Concerned District
24.	Health	Issuance of Multiple Disability Certificate	7 Days (After Completion of necessary tests etc.)	Senior Medical Officer I/C District Hospital and Sub Divisional Hospital	Sub Divisional Magistrate of the Concerned SubDivision	Additional Deputy Commissioner (General)/Deputy Commissioner of the Concerned District
25.	Health	Emergency Medical Response (Ambulance at 108)	20 minutes (Urban)/30 minutes (Rural)	Deputy Medical Commissioner Under Health System Corporation	Additional Deputy Commissioner (General)	District Deputy Commissioner
26.	Health	Janani Suraksha Yojana assistance	Before the discharge of mother from Hospital subject to availability of funds	In-charge Medical Officer of the Institution	Sub Divisional Magistrate of the Concerned Sub-Division	District Deputy Commissioner
27.	Health	Mata Kaushalya Yojana Assistance	Before the discharge of mother from Hospital subject to availability of funds	In-charge Medical Officer of the Institution	Sub Divisional Magistrate of the Concerned Sub-Division	District Deputy Commissioner
28.	Health	Supply of essential medicine (as notified by the department for different Institutions)	Same day subject to availability of medicines	In-charge Medical Officer of the Institution	Sub Divisional Magistrate / Additional Deputy Commissioner (General)	District Deputy Commissioner
29.	Health	Facility for X-ray / Pathological Test, vaccination-DT/Polio Anti Rabies, Anti Venom ( as notified by the Department for different institutions)	Same day subject to availability of material for such tests	In-charge Medical Officer of the Institution	Sub Divisional Magistrate / Additional Deputy Commissioner (General)	District Deputy Commissioner
30.	Health	Rashtriya Bal Swasthya Karyakram (RBSK) Regular and Periodical checkup of 30 diseases	6 months	District Nodal Officer RBSK -cum- District Vaccination Officer	Civil Surgeon	Deputy Commissioner
31.	Health	Issuance of Medical Certificate	Within 2 days	Medical Officer Concerned	Civil Surgeon	DC of Concerned District
32.	Health	Issuance/ Permission/Rejection of Registration Certificate to Ultra Sound Centers	Within 90 days	SMO	Civil Surgeon	Deputy Commissioner
33.	Health	Issuance of fresh Drug License/Renewal to Retail Chemists	30 days subject to submission of requisite documentation	Drug Inspector notified as Zonal Licensing Authority of the Districts	State Drugs Controller	Commissioner Food and Drug
34.	Health	Issuance of fresh Drug License/Renewal to Wholeseller Chemists	45 days subject to submission of requisite documentation	State Drug Controller/Assistant Drug Controller . Punjab	Commissioner Food and Drug	Principal secretary Health
35.	Health	Issuance of fresh Drug License to Manufacturers	60 days subject to submission of requisite documentation	State Drug Controller/Assistant Drug Controller . Punjab	Commissioner Food and Drug	Principal secretary Health
36.	Health	Issuance of fresh Drug License/Renewal to Retail Sale Homeopathic	30 days subject to submission of requisite documentation	Drug Inspector notified as Zonal Licensing Authority of the Districts	State Drug Controller	Commissioner Food and Drug
37.	Health	Issuance of fresh Drug License/Renewal to Retail Sale Homeopathic	45 days	State Drug Controller/Assistant Drug Controller . Punjab	Commissioner Food and Drug	Principal secretary Health
38.	Health	Issuance of Drug License to Manufacturers of Homeopathy medicines	60 days	State Drug Controller/Assistant Drug Controller . Punjab	Commissioner Food and Drug	Principal secretary Health
39.	Health	Cosmetic Manufacturing License	60 days	State Drug Controller/Assistant Drug Controller . Punjab	Commissioner Food and Drug	Principal secretary Health
40.	Health	Issuance of Drug License to Manufacturers of Ayurvedic medicines	3 Months	Director Ayurveda	Additional Secretary Health	Principal secretary Health
41.	Health	Issuance of Registration Certificate for Food (turnover <Rs. 12 lakh)	7 days	Food Safety Officer	Designated Officer Food Safety	Deputy Commissioner
42.	Health	Issuance of License for Food (turnover >Rs. 12 lakh)	60 days	Designated Health Officer (DHO)	Joint Commissioner Food and Drug	Commissioner Food and Drug
43a.	Transport	Registration Certificate of Vehicles (Non Transport)	21 days	Registering Authority (DTO in case of District HQ and SDM in case of Sub-Division)	Additional Deputy Commissioner (General) of the Concerned District	District Deputy Commissioner
43b.	Transport	Registration Certificate of Vehicles (Transport)	21 days	Registering Authority DTO of the Concerned district	Additional Deputy Commissioner (General) of the Concerned District	District Deputy Commissioner
44.	Transport	Fitness Certificate for Commercial Vehicle	7 days	Motor Vehicle Inspector	Additional Deputy Commissioner (General) of the Concerned District	District Deputy Commissioner
45.	Transport	Issue of Driving License - Motor Car / Motor Cycle	7 days	Licensing Authority (DTO in case of District HQ and SDM in case of SubDivision)	Additional Deputy Commissioner (General) of the Concerned District	District Deputy Commissioner
46.	Transport	Issue of Tax Clearance Certificate (for period up to 2 years from date of application)	7 Days	Section Officer, DTO Office	Additional Deputy Commissioner (General) of the Concerned District	District Deputy Commissioner
47.	Transport	Issue of Tax Clearance Certificate (for period beyond 2 years)	21 days	Section Officer, DTO Office	Additional Deputy Commissioner (General) of the Concerned District	District Deputy Commissioner
48.	Transport	Issue of Route Permit or National Permit	7 Days	Secretary, Regional Transport Authority	Additional Deputy Commissioner (General) of the Concerned District	District Deputy Commissioner
49.	Transport	Addition / Deletion of Hire Purchase Entry	3 Days	Registering Authority (DTO in case of district HQ and SDM in case of Sub-Division	Additional Deputy Commissioner (General) of the Concerned District	District Deputy Commissioner
50.	Transport	Transfer of Vehicle (if the place of registration is the same place)	7 Days	Registering Authority (DTO in case of district HQ and SDM in case of Sub-Division	Additional Deputy Commissioner (General) of the Concerned District	District Deputy Commissioner
51.	Transport	Renewal of Driving License	7 Days	Registering Authority(DTO in case of District HQ and SDM in case of Sub- Division	Additional Deputy Commissioner (General)	District Deputy Commissioner
52.	Personnel	Issue of Residence Certificate etc.	15 Days	Tehsildar of the Concerned SubDivision	SDM of the Concerned Sub-Division	District Deputy Commissioner
53.	Food, Civil Supplies and Consumer Affairs	Issuance of NOC for setting up of Petrol Pump	35 Days 1.Time for obtaining NOC from various departments by the Office of Licensing Authority (23 days): 2. Time for action by the Designated Officer to deliver the service (12 Days) Total 35 days	Additional District Magistrate Or Additional Deputy Commissioner (HQ) in case of Police Commissionerate	District Magistrate or Deputy Commissioner of Police in case of Police Commissionerate	Commissioner of Division or Commissioner of Police
54a.	Housing & Urban Development	Sanction of Building Plans –Authority, Revised Building Plans (Residential)	30 days	SDO Building	Additional Chief Administrator	Additional Deputy Commissioner (General) / Deputy Commissioner
54b.	Housing & Urban Development	Sanction of Building Plans –Authority, Revised Building Plans (Residential)	30 days	SDO Building	Additional Chief Administrator	Additional Deputy Commissioner (General) / Deputy Commissioner
55.	Housing & Urban Development	Issue of Completion / Occupation Certificate for Building	15 days	SDO Building	Additional Chief Administrator	Additional Deputy Commissioner (General) / Deputy Commissioner
56.	Housing & Urban Development	Issue of No Objection Certificate / Duplicate Allotment / Reallotment Letter	10 days (No Objection Certificate) / 3 days (Duplicate Allotment letter)/ 10 days (Re-allotment Letter)	Superintendent	Estate Officer	Additional Chief Administrator
57.	Housing & Urban Development	Issue of Conveyance Deed	15 days	Estate Officer	Additional Chief Administrator	Additional Deputy Commissioner (General)/ Deputy Commissioner
58.	Housing & Urban Development	Issue of No Due Certificate	5 days	Account Officer	Estate Officer	Additional Chief Administrator
59.	Housing & Urban Development	Transfer of Property in case of sale (NOC)	10 days	Superintendent	Estate Officer	Additional Chief Administrator
60.	Housing & Urban Development	Transfer of property in case of death (uncontested) a) All Legal heirs b) Registered Will c) Un-Registered Will	a) 30 days b) 30 days c) 45 days	Estate Officer	Additional Chief Administrator	Additional Deputy Commissioner (General)/ Deputy Commissioner
61.	Housing & Urban Development	Issue of permission for mortgage	7 days	Superintendent	Estate Officer	Additional Chief Administrator
62.	Housing & Urban Development	Attested copy of any Documents	3 days	Superintendent	Additional Chief Administrator	Additional Deputy Commissioner (General)/ Deputy Commissioner
63.	Housing & Urban Development	Change of Ownership	5 days	Estate Officer	Additional Chief Administrator	Additional Deputy Commissioner (General)/ Deputy Commissioner
64.	Housing & Urban Development	Demarcation of Plot	5 days	Sub Divisional Officer (Building)	Additional Chief Administrator	Additional Deputy Commissioner (General)/ Deputy Commissioner
65.	Housing & Urban Development	Issue of Plinth/Roof Level Certificate	7 days	Sub divisional officer (Building)	Additional Chief Administrator	Additional Deputy Commissioner (General)/ Deputy Commissioner
66.	Housing & Urban Development	Water Supply and Sewerage connection	7 days	Sub Divisional Officer (Public Health)	Additional Chief Administrator	Additional Deputy Commissioner (General)/ Deputy Commissioner
67a.	Local Government	Sanction of Building Plans/ Revised Building Plans (Residential) – in Improvement Trust Areas.	30 days	Executive Officer of the concerned Improvement Trust	SDM of the concerned Sub- Division	District Deputy Commissioner
67b.	Local Government	Sanction of Building Plans/ Revised Building Plans (Other than Residential)- in Improvement Trust Areas.	60 days	Executive Officer of the concerned Improvement Trust	SDM of the concerned Sub- Division	District Deputy Commissioner
68.	Local Government	Issue of Completion / Occupation Certificate for Buildings (All Categories)	15 days	Executive Officer of the concerned Improvement Trust	SDM of the Concerned Sub-Division	District Deputy Commissioner
69.	Local Government	Issue of No Objection Certificate / Duplicate Allotment / Reallotment Letter	21 days	Executive Officer of the concerned Improvement Trust	SDM of the Concerned Sub-Division	District Deputy Commissioner
70.	Local Government	Issue of Conveyance Deed	15 days	Executive Officer of the concerned Improvement Trust	SDM of the Concerned Sub-Division	District Deputy Commissioner
71.	Local Government	Issue of No Due Certificate	7 days	Executive Officer of the concerned Improvement Trust	SDM of the Concerned Sub-Division	District Deputy Commissioner
72.	Local Government	Transfer of property in case of sale	15 days	Executive Officer of the concerned Improvement Trust	SDM of the Concerned Sub-Division	District Deputy Commissioner
73.	Local Government	Transfer of property in case of death (uncontested)	45 days	Executive Officer of the concerned Improvement Trust	SDM of the Concerned Sub-Division	District Deputy Commissioner
74.	Local Government	Issue of permission for mortgage	7 days	Executive Officer of the concerned Improvement Trust	SDM of the Concerned Sub-Division	District Deputy Commissioner
75a.	Local Government	Sanction of Building Plans/ Revised Building Plans (Residential)-in Municipal \ Corporation Cities and in Municipal Council Towns	30 days	Commissioner of the Concerned Municipal Corporation in Corporation Cities and Executive Officer Of the Concerned Municipal Council in the Municipal Towns	Deputy Commissioner of the concerned District in case of Corporation Cities and SDM of the concerned Sub- Division in case of Municipal Towns	Commissioner of the concerned Division and Deputy Commissioner of the concerned District
75b.	Local Government	Sanction of Building Plans/ Revised Building Plans (Other than Residential)-in Municipal Corporation Cities and in Municipal Council Towns	60 days	Commissioner of the Concerned Municipal Corporation in Corporation Cities and Executive Officer Of the Concerned Municipal Council in the Municipal Towns	Deputy Commissioner of the concerned District in case of Corporation Cities and SDM of the concerned Sub-Division in case of Municipal Towns	Commissioner of the concerned Division and Deputy Commissioner of the concerned District
76.	Local Government	Issue of Completion / Occupation Certificate for Buildings (All Categories)-in Corporation Cities and Municipal Council Towns	30 days	Commissioner of the Concerned Municipal Corporation in Corporation Cities and Executive Officer Of the Concerned Municipal Council in the Municipal Towns	Deputy Commissioner of the concerned District in case of Corporation Cities and SDM of the concerned Sub-Division in case of Municipal Towns	Commissioner of the concerned Division and Deputy Commissioner of the concerned District
77.	Local Government	Sanction of Water Supply / Sewerage Connection in Corporation Cities	7 days	Executive Engineer (O& M) of the Concerned Municipal Corporation	SDM of the Concerned Sub-Division	District Deputy Commissioner
78.	Local Government	Sanction of Water Supply / Sewerage Connection in M.C. Towns	7 days	Assistant Municipal Engineer of the concerned Municipal Council	SDM of the Concerned District	District Deputy Commissioner
79.	Local Government	Issue of Conveyance Deed in Municipal Committees and Municipal Corporations	15 days	Executive Officer of Municipal Committees or Assistant Commissioners of Concerned Municipal Corporations	Sub Divisional Magistrate of the Concerned District	District Deputy Commissioner
80.	Local Government	Sanction of Water Supply/Sewerage connection in the Improvement Trusts	7 days	Executive Officer of Concerned Improvement Trust	Sub Divisional Magistrate of the Concerned District	District Deputy Commissioner
81.	Local Government	Issuance/ Renewal of Trade License by Municipal Committees and Municipal Corporations	12 days	Superintendent of the Concerned Municipal Committees or Municipal Corporations	Sub Divisional Magistrate of the Concerned District	District Deputy Commissioner
82.	Local Government	Removal of Solid waste from streets/roads	2 days	Executive Officer	Sub Divisional Magistrate of the Concerned District	District Deputy Commissioner
83.	Local Government	Replacement of Street lights	10 days	Executive Officer	Sub Divisional Magistrate of the Concerned District	District Deputy Commissioner
84.	Local Government	Water pipes leakages/Sewerage/ Blocked/Over flow	24 hours	Executive Officer	SDM of the Concerned District	District Deputy Commissioner
85a.	Local Government	Change of Title in Water & Sewerage Bill/Water & Sewerage Bill Amendment	7 days	Additional/ Joint Commissioner in case of Municipal Corporations & EO in case of Municipal Committees/Improvement Trusts	Commissioner, MC in case of Municipal Corporations & SDM of the Concerned Sub-Division in case of Municipal Committees	District Deputy Commissioner
85b.	Local Government	Approval of Water Disconnection/ Reconnection	7 days	Additional/ Joint Commissioner in case of Municipal Corporations & EO in case of Municipal Committees/Improvement Trusts	Commissioner, MC in case of Municipal Corporations & SDM of the Concerned Sub-Division in case of Municipal Committees	District Deputy Commissioner
85c.	Local Government	Approval of Sewerage Disconnection / Reconnection	7 days	Additional/ Joint Commissioner in case of Municipal Corporations & EO in case of Municipal Committees/Improvement Trusts	Commissioner, MC in case of Municipal Corporations & SDM of the Concerned Sub-Division in case of Municipal Committees	District Deputy Commissioner
86.	Local Government	License for Slaughterhouse	30 days	Additional/ Joint Commissioner in case of Municipal Corporations & EO in case of Municipal Committees/Improvement Trusts	Commissioner, MC in case of Municipal Corporations & SDM of the Concerned Sub-Division in case of Municipal Committees	District Deputy Commissioner
87.	Local Government	Approval of Additional Construction	30 days	Additional/ Joint Commissioner in case of Municipal Corporations & EO in case of Municipal Committees/Improvement Trusts	Commissioner, MC in case of Municipal Corporations & SDM of the Concerned Sub-Division in case of Municipal Committees	District Deputy Commissioner
88.	Local Government	Sanction of Change of Land Use	60 days	Additional/ Joint Commissioner in case of Municipal Corporations & EO in case of Municipal Committees/Improvement Trusts	Commissioner, MC in case of Municipal Corporations & SDM of the Concerned Sub-Division in case of Municipal Committees	District Deputy Commissioner
89.	Local Government	Issue of NOC for Fire Safety	30 days	Additional/ Joint Commissioner in case of Municipal Corporations & EO in case of Municipal Committees/Improvement Trusts	Commissioner, MC in case of Municipal Corporations & SDM of the Concerned Sub-Division in case of Municipal Committees	District Deputy Commissioner
90a.	Local Government	Conveying the Assessment regarding Property Tax	One hour or immediately when deposited	Additional/ Joint Commissioner in case of Municipal Corporations & EO in case of Municipal Committees/Improvement Trusts	Commissioner, MC in case of Municipal Corporations & SDM of the Concerned Sub-Division in case of Municipal Committees	District Deputy Commissioner
90b.	Local Government	Collection of property tax	One hour or immediately when deposited	Additional/ Joint Commissioner in case of Municipal Corporations & EO in case of Municipal Committees/Improvement Trusts	Commissioner, MC in case of Municipal Corporations & SDM of the Concerned Sub-Division in case of Municipal Committees	District Deputy Commissioner
91.	Local Government	Issue of Bus Pass (for buses operated by the ULB)	Same day	Additional/ Joint Commissioner in case of Municipal Corporations & EO in case of Municipal Committees/Improvement Trusts	Commissioner, MC in case of Municipal Corporations & SDM of the Concerned Sub-Division in case of Municipal Committees	District Deputy Commissioner
92.	Local Government	Issuance of Possession Letters	30 days after allotment letter of sold property	Additional/ Joint Commissioner in case of Municipal Corporations & EO in case of Municipal Committees/Improvement Trusts	Commissioner, MC in case of Municipal Corporations & SDM of the Concerned Sub-Division in case of Municipal Committees	District Deputy Commissioner
93.	Local Government	Issuance of Allotment Letters	60 days after auction /sold	Additional/ Joint Commissioner in case of Municipal Corporations & EO in case of Municipal Committees/Improvement Trusts	Commissioner, MC in case of Municipal Corporations & SDM of the Concerned Sub-Division in case of Municipal Committees	District Deputy Commissioner
94.	Local Government	Approval for time extension for building plans	15 days	Additional/ Joint Commissioner in case of Municipal Corporations & EO in case of Municipal Committees/Improvement Trusts	Commissioner, MC in case of Municipal Corporations & SDM of the Concerned Sub-Division in case of Municipal Committees	District Deputy Commissioner
95.	Rural Water Supply & Sanitation	Sanction of Water Supply Connection	7 days	Sub-Divisional Engineer	SDM of the Concerned Sub-Division	District Deputy Commissioner
96a.	Social Security	Sanction of all social security benefits to old age/ handicapped / widow (Urban Areas)	30 days for the first time	Executive Officer of the Municipal Council/Nagar Panchayat or SubDivisional Magistrate	Additional Deputy Commissioner (General) of the Concerned District	District Deputy Commissioner
96b.	Social Security	Sanction of all social security benefits to old age/ handicapped / widow (Rural Areas)	30 days for the first time	Child Development Project Officer or District Social Security Officer	Additional Deputy Commissioner (General) of the Concerned District	District Deputy Commissioner
97.	Social Security	Disbursement of old age/ handicapped / widow/ other pension and benefits -New Cases	30 days from the date of sanction subject to availability of funds	District Social Security Officer/CDPO	Additional Deputy Commissioner (General) of the Concerned District	District Deputy Commissioner
98.	Social Security'	Issue of Identity Cards to all categories of Handicapped persons	7 days	District Social Security Officer	Additional Deputy Commissioner (General) of the Concerned District	District Deputy Commissioner
99.	Social Security	Senior Citizen's I. Cards	One week	District Social Security Officer	Additional Deputy Commissioner (General) of the Concerned District	District Deputy Commissioner
100.	Social Security	Sanction of Scholarship to physically challenged	30 days	District Social Security Officer	Additional Deputy Commissioner (General) of the Concerned District	District Deputy Commissioner
101.	Social Security	Disbursement of scholarship to physically challenged -New Cases	30 days from the date of sanction subject to availability of funds	District Social Security Officer	Additional Deputy Commissioner (General) of the Concerned District	District Deputy Commissioner
102.	Social Security	Sanction of financial assistance to Dependent Children (Urban) area	30 days for the first time	Executive officer of the municipal council/Nagar Panchayat or SubDivisional Magistrate	Additional Deputy Commissioner (General) of the Concerned District	District Deputy Commissioner
103.	Social Security	Sanction of financial assistance to Dependent Children (Rural Areas)	30 days for the first time	Child Development Project officer of District social Security Officer	Additional Deputy Commissioner (General) of the Concerned District	District Deputy Commissioner
104.	Social Security	Sanction of National Family Benefit Scheme (Rural and Urban area)	30 Days	District Social Security Officer of the Concerned District	Additional Deputy Commissioner (General) of the Concerned District	District Deputy Commissioner
105.	Welfare of S.C.'s and B.C.'s	Issue of various Certificates like Caste, OBC etc.	15 days	Tehsildar of the Concerned SubDivision	SDM of the Concerned Sub-Division	District Deputy Commissioner
106	Welfare of S.C.'s and B.C.'s	Sanction of stipends/ Scholarship	1(one) Month	District Welfare Officer	Additional Deputy Commissioner	District Deputy Commissioner
107a.	Welfare of S.C.'s and B.C.'s	Sanction of Stipend etc.-new cases	60 days from date of application sanction	District Welfare Officer	Additional Deputy Commissioner	District Deputy Commissioner
107b.	Welfare of S.C.'s and B.C.'s	Disbursement of Stipend etc.- new cases	60 days from the date of sanction subject to availability of funds.	District Welfare Officer	Additional Deputy Commissioner	District Deputy Commissioner
108.	Welfare of S.C.'s and B.C.'s	Supply of Text Books	15 days before the start of school classes	District Welfare Officer	Additional Deputy Commissioner	District Deputy Commissioner
109.	Welfare of S.C.'s and B.C.'s	Term Loan to SC	Grant Based Scheme i) For Sanction of loan: within 45 days after submission of required paper in all respect ii) For disbursement of loans: within 60 days after release of funds by the Govt and further, after submission of the required papers (Mortgage)	Executive director	Chairman	Secretary, Welfare
110	Welfare of S.C.'s and B.C.'s	Term Loan to BC	Grant Based Scheme i) For Sanction of loan: within 45 days after submission of required paper in all respect ii) For disbursement of loans: within 60 days after release of funds by the Govt and further, after submission of the required papers (Mortgage)	Executive director	Chairman	Secretary, Welfare
111.	Welfare of S.C.'s and B.C.'s	Shagun Scheme	i) For sanction of case : within 45 days after submission of the required papers in all respect ii) For disbursement of Financial Assistance, within 30 days subject to the availability of funds	District Welfare Officer Director, Welfare	Secretary, Welfare	
112.	Home	Registration of Marriage under Hindu Marriage Act	2 days from the expiry of 15 days notice period as provided in the Hindu Marriage Act.	Tehsildar of the Concerned SubDivision	SDM of the Concerned Sub-Division	Deputy Commissioner of the Concerned District
113a.	Home	Renewal of Arms License.	22 Days (i). 2 days Time for referring case to the Police by the DC office. (ii)15 days Time for verification by the police. (iii) 5 days Time for delivery of services by the Designated Officer after Verification	Licensing authority (Addl. DM of the District/ Addl. Deputy Commissioner of Police (HQ)in case of police Commissionerate	District Magistrate of the Concerned district / Deputy Commissioner of Police	Commissioner of the Concerned Division/ Commissioner of Police in case of Commissionerate
113b.	Home	Renewal in case of licensee has shifted his residence from the license issuing district to another district	30 Days (i).5 days for the forwarding district to the original license issuing district. (ii) 20 days for sending verification report by the original license issuing district to the forwarding district. (iii). 5 days for delivery of service by the forwarding	Licensing Authority (Addl. DM of the District / Addl. Deputy Commissioner of Police (HQ) in case of police Commissionerate	District Magistrate of the Concerned district / Deputy Commissioner of Police	Commissioner of the Concerned Division/ Commissioner of Police in case of Commissionerate
113c.	Home	Renewal of Arms License in the case where an adverse report is received from the police and an opportunity of being heard has to be given to the Licensee before taking any action as provided under the Arms Act.	Additional 60 days	Licensing Authority (Addl. DM of the District / Addl. Deputy Commissioner of Police (HQ) in case of police Commissionerate	District Magistrate of the Concerned district / Deputy Commissioner of Police	Commissioner of the Concerned Division/ Commissioner of Police in case of Commissionerate
113d.	Home	Renewal of Arms License (In the case where the applicant applies for renewal after the due date)	40 days (i) 3 days Time for referring case to the Police by Licensing Authority Office. (ii) 15 days Time for verification by the police. (iii) Additional 15 days for providing an opportunity of personal hearing by the Licensing Authority. (iv) 7 days Time for delivery of services by the Degignated Officer.	Licensing Authority (Addl. DM of the District / Addl. Deputy Commissioner of Police (HQ) in case of police Commissionerate	District Magistrate of the Concerned district / Deputy Commissioner of Police	Commissioner of the Concerned Division/ Commissioner of Police in case of Commissionerate
114a.	Home	Addition / Deletion of weapon (if the licence issuing district is the same where service has been sought)	7 days from the expiry of the mandatory notice period of 45 days as provided under the Arms act.	Licensing Authority (Addl. DM of the District / Addl. Deputy Commissioner of Police (HQ) in case of police Commissionerate	District Magistrate of the Concerned district / Deputy Commissioner of Police	Commissioner of the Concerned Division/Commissioner of Police
114b.	Home	Entry of Weapon on Arms License	7 days	Licensing Authority (Addl. DM of the District / Addl. Deputy Commissioner of Police (HQ) in case of police Commissionerate	District Magistrate of the Concerned district / Deputy Commissioner of Police	Commissioner of the Concerned Division/Commissioner of Police
115.	Home	Extension of purchase period of weapon, (within permissible time period and if the license issuing district is the same where service has been sought)	7 days	Licensing Authority (Addl. DM of the District / Addl. Deputy Commissioner of Police (HQ) in case of police Commissionerate	District Magistrate of the Concerned district / Deputy Commissioner of Police	Commissioner of the Concerned Division/Commissioner of Police
116.	Home	Registration of Foreigners (Arrival and Departure)	Immediate	Additional Deputy Commissioner of police (Hq.) of the Police Commissionerate or Superintendent of Police (Hq) of the Concerned Police	District Magistrate of the Concerned district / Deputy Commissioner of Police	Commissioner of the Concerned Division/Commissioner of Police
117.	Home	Extension of Residential Permit of Foreigners	5 days	Additional Deputy Commissioner of police (Hq.) of the Police Commissionerate or Superintendent of Police (Hq) of the Concerned Police	District Magistrate of the Concerned district / Deputy Commissioner of Police	Commissioner of Police or Deputy Inspector General of Police of the Range
118.	Home	Copy of FIR or DDR	Immediate/ Online	Station House Officer of the Concerned Police Station or In-charge of Community Policing Saanjh Centre at the Sub-Division	DSP In-charge of Sub division	Commissioner of Police or Senior Superintendent of Police
119	Home	NOC for use of loud speakers (applicable only in case of S.D.M. obtains N.O.C. from the Concerned S.H.O before granting permission)	5 days	Station House Officer of the Concerned Police Station or In-charge of Community Policing Saanjh Centre at the Sub-Division	DSP In-charge of Sub division	Commissioner of Police or Senior Superintendent of Police
120.	Home	NOC for Fairs / Melas / Exhibitions / Sports Events etc.	5 days	Station House Officer of the Concerned Police Station or In-charge of Community Policing Saanjh Centre at the Sub-Division	DSP In-charge of Sub division	Commissioner of Police or Senior Superintendent of Police
121	Home	Stranger Verification (after receiving the verification from other District / State of which the stranger is resident)	5 days	Station House Officer of the Concerned Police Station or In-charge of Community Policing Saanjh Centre at the Sub-Division	DSP In-charge of Sub division	Commissioner of Police or Senior Superintendent of Police
122	Home	Tenant / Servant Verification (if resident of local area)	5 days	Station House Officer of the Concerned Police Station or In-charge of Community Policing Saanjh Centre at the Sub-Division	DSP In-charge of Sub division	Commissioner of Police or Senior Superintendent of Police
123	Home	Tenant / Servant Verification (if resident of other District / State and after receiving the verification from other District / State)	5 days	Station House Officer of the Concerned Police Station or In-charge of Community Policing Saanjh Centre at the Sub-Division	DSP In-charge of Sub division	Commissioner of Police or Senior Superintendent of Police
124	Home	Other Verification related services	30 days	Station House Officer of the Concerned Police Station or In-charge of Community Policing Saanjh Centre at the Sub-Division	DSP In-charge of Sub division	Commissioner of Police or Senior Superintendent of Police
125	Home	Copy of untraced report in road accident cases	45 days	Station House Officer of the Concerned Police Station or In-charge of Community Policing Saanjh Centre at the Sub-Division	DSP In-charge of Sub division	Commissioner of Police or Senior Superintendent of Police
126	Home	Copy of untraced report in cases pertaining to stolen vehicles	45 days	Station House Officer of the Concerned Police Station or In-charge of Community Policing Saanjh Centre at the Sub-Division	DSP In-charge of Sub division	Commissioner of Police or Senior Superintendent of Police
127	Home	Copy of untraced report in theft cases	60 days	Station House Officer of the Concerned Police Station or In-charge of Community Policing Saanjh Centre at the Sub-Division	DSP In-charge of Sub division	Commissioner of Police or Senior Superintendent of Police
128	Home	NOC for pre-owned vehicles	5 days	Station House Officer of the Concerned Police Station or In-charge of Community Policing Saanjh Centre at the Sub-Division	DSP In-charge of Sub division	Commissioner of Police or Senior Superintendent of Police
129	Home	Police Record checking (For newly appointed persons in government and semi government departments)	10 days	Assistant Commissioner of Police Sub- Division or Deputy Superintendent of Police Sub- Division	Deputy Commissioner of Police or Senior Superintendent of Police	Commissioner of Police or Deputy Inspector General of Police of the Range
130	Home	Police Clearance Certificate (For private employment etc.)	10 days	Assistant Commissioner of Police Sub- Division or Deputy Superintendent of Police Sub- Division	Deputy Commissioner of Police or Senior Superintendent of Police	Commissioner of Police or Deputy Inspector General of Police of the Range
131	Home	NOC for issuance / renewal of License of Arms Dealers	15 days	Additional Deputy Commissioner of Police (Hq.) of the Police Commissionerate or Superintendent of Police (Hq.) of the Concerned Police	Deputy Commissioner of Police or Senior Superintendent of Police	Commissioner of Police or Deputy Inspector General of Police of the Range
132	Home	Issuance of NOC for setting up of Cinema Hall	30 days i)Time for obtaining NOC from various department by the office of Deputy Commissioner or Police Commissionerate (15 days). ii)Time for action by Deputy Commissioner office to deliver the service (15 days).	Addl. District Magistrate or Additional Deputy Commissioner (HQ) in case of Police Commissionerate	District Magistrate or Deputy Commissioner of Police in case of Police Commissionerate	Commissioner of Division or Commissioner of Police
133	Home	Police Record Checking of Passport Applicants	21 Days	Additional Deputy Commissioner of Police (HQ) or Superintendent of Police (HQ)	Deputy Commissioner of Police or Sr. Superintendent of Police	Commissioner of Police or Inspector General of Police Zone
134	Home	Verification for fresh Arms License	30 days	Additional Deputy Commissioner of Police (HQ) or Superintendent of Police (HQ)	Deputy Commissioner of Police or Sr. Superintendent of Police	Commissioner of Police or Inspector General of Police Zone
135	Home	Acknowledgement of Complaint	Same day when the complaint is received by the Designated Officer through any source.	Station House officer	DSP In-charge of the sub division	Commissioner of Police or Senior Superintendent of Police
136	Home	Status report of complaints	21 days	Station House officer	DSP In-charge of the sub division	Commissioner of Police or Senior Superintendent of Police
137	Home	Issuance of Marriageability Certificate	45 Days including statutory notice 15 days after statutory notice	District Magistrate	Divisional Commissioner	Principal secretary (Home)
138	Home	Solemnization of Marriage under Special Marriage Act, 1954	45 Days including statutory notice 15 days after statutory notice	District Magistrate	Divisional Commissioner	Principal secretary (Home)
139	Home	Registration of Marriage under the Punjab Compulsory Registration of Marriage Act, 2012	7 Days	Registrar (Tehsildar)	SDM	Deputy Commissioner
140	Home	MRG Enquiry in case of loss of passport abroad	21 Days	Additional Deputy Commissioner of Police (H.Q.) in Commissionerate Districts and Superintendent of Police (H.Q.) in other districts	Deputy Commissioner of Police in Commissionerate Districts and Senior Superintendent of Police, in other districts	Commissioner of Police in Commissionerate Districts and Inspector General of Police Zone, in other districts
141	Home	Other services related with passport. (Report for loss of passport, Nativity Certificate )	21 days	Additional Deputy Commissioner of Police (H.Q.) in Commissionerate Districts and Superintendent of Police (H.Q.) in other districts	Deputy Commissioner of Police in Commissionerate Districts and Senior Superintendent of Police, in other districts	Commissioner of Police in Commissionerate Districts and Inspector General of Police Zone, in other districts
142	Home	Countersigning of Document	7 Days	Additional Deputy Commissioner of Police (H.Q.) in Commissionerate Districts and Superintendent of Police (H.Q.) in other districts	Deputy Commissioner of Police in Commissionerate Districts and Senior Superintendent of Police, in other districts	Commissioner of Police in Commissionerate Districts and Inspector General of Police Zone, in other districts
143a.	Home	Issuance of New Arms License	30 days 2 Working days for referring case to the Police by the Licensing Authority. i) 23 Working days for verification by the Police. 5 Working days for delivery of the service by the Designated Officer after verification.	Licensing authority (Addl. DM of the District/ Addl. Deputy Commissioner of Police (HQ) in case of police Commissionerate	District Magistrate of the Concerned district/ Deputy Commissioner of Police	Commissioner of the concerned Division / Commissioner of Police in case of Commissionerate
143b.	Home	Issuance of Duplicate Arms License	10 Days	Licensing Authority (Addl. DM of the district / Addl. Deputy Commissioner of Police (H.Q.) in case of Police	District Magistrate of the Concerned district/ Deputy Commissioner of Police	Commissioner of the concerned Division / Commissioner of Police
143c.	Home	NOC for Sale of Weapon	10 Days	Licensing authority (Addl. DM of the District/ Addl. Deputy Commissioner of Police (HQ) in case of police Commissionerate	District Magistrate of the Concerned district/ Deputy Commissioner of Police	Commissioner of the concerned Division / Commissioner of Police
143d.	Home	Application for Extension of Jurisdiction (Punjab)	10 Days	Licensing Authority (Addl. DM of the district / Addl. Deputy Commissioner of Police (H.Q.) in case of Police	District Magistrate of the Concerned district/ Deputy Commissioner of Police	Commissioner of the concerned Division / Commissioner of Police
143e.	Home	Cancellation of Arms License on the request of the licensee	30 Days	Licensing Authority (Addl. DM of the district / Addl. Deputy Commissioner of Police (H.Q.) in case of Police	District Magistrate of the Concerned district/ Deputy Commissioner of Police	Commissioner of the concerned Division / Commissioner of Police
143f.	Home	Change of Address in Arms License	30 Days	Licensing Authority (Addl. DM of the district / Addl. Deputy Commissioner of Police (H.Q.) in case of Police	District Magistrate of the Concerned district/ Deputy Commissioner of Police	Commissioner of the concerned Division / Commissioner of Police
143g.	Home	Appointment of Retainer of Weapon	15 days	Licensing Authority (Addl. DM of the district / Addl. Deputy Commissioner of Police (H.Q.) in case of Police	District Magistrate of the Concerned district/ Deputy Commissioner of Police	Commissioner of the concerned Division / Commissioner of Police
143h.	Home	Addition/Deletion of Retainer in Arms License	30 Days	Licensing Authority (Addl. DM of the district / Addl. Deputy Commissioner of Police (H.Q.) in case of Police	District Magistrate of the Concerned district/ Deputy Commissioner of Police	Commissioner of the concerned Division / Commissioner of Police
143i.	Home	Change of Bore	10 Days	Licensing Authority (Addl. DM of the district / Addl. Deputy Commissioner of Police (H.Q.) in case of Police	District Magistrate of the Concerned district/ Deputy Commissioner of Police	Commissioner of the concerned Division / Commissioner of Police
143j.	Home	Permission for Deposit of weapon in death Case	1 Day	Licensing Authority (Addl. DM of the district / Addl. Deputy Commissioner of Police (H.Q.) in case of Police	District Magistrate of the Concerned district/ Deputy Commissioner of Police	Commissioner of the concerned Division / Commissioner of Police
143k.	Home	Permission for sale / transfer of Weapon in Death Case	30 Days	Licensing Authority (Addl. DM of the district / Addl. Deputy Commissioner of Police (H.Q.) in case of Police	District Magistrate of the Concerned district/ Deputy Commissioner of Police	Commissioner of the concerned Division / Commissioner of Police
143l.	Home	Permission of addition of Cartridges	10 days	Licensing authority (Addl. DM of the District/ Addl. Deputy Commissioner of Police (HQ) in case of police Commissionerate	District Magistrate of the Concerned district/ Deputy Commissioner of Police	Commissioner of the concerned Division / Commissioner of Police
144	Agriculture/Mandi Board	Supply of Soil Sample Results	7 days	Agriculture Officer Incharge	Sub Divisional Magistrate of the Concerned Sub Division	Additional Deputy Commissioner (General)/Deputy Commissioner of the Concerned District
145	Agriculture/Mandi Board	Issue of NOC/Duplicate Allotment/Re-Allotment	21 days	Estate Officer Punjab Mandi Board	Additional Director (Estate)	Secretary Punjab Mandi Board
146	Agriculture/Mandi Board	Issue of Conveyance Deed	15 days	Estate Officer Punjab Mandi Board	Additional Director (Estate)	Secretary Punjab Mandi Board
147	Agriculture/Mandi Board	Issue of No Due Certificate	15 days	Estate Officer Punjab Mandi Board	Additional Director (Estate)	Secretary Punjab Mandi Board
148	Agriculture/Mandi Board	Re-transfer of property in Case of Sale	15 days	Estate Officer Punjab Mandi Board	Additional Director (Estate)	Secretary Punjab Mandi Board
149	Agriculture/Mandi Board	Re-transfer of property in Case of Death (Uncontested)	45 days	Estate Officer Punjab Mandi Board	Additional Director (Estate)	Secretary Punjab Mandi Board
150	Agriculture/Mandi Board	Issue of N.O.C for Mortgage	15 days	Estate Officer Punjab Mandi Board	Additional Director (Estate)	Secretary Punjab Mandi Board
151	Agriculture/Mandi Board	Issue of J-form to farmers	3 days	Secretary Market Committee	Sub Divisional Magistrate of the Concerned SubDivision	Additional Deputy Commissioner (General)/Deputy Commissioner of the Concerned District
152	Agriculture/Mandi Board	Providing Financial Aid (Exgratia) to cultivators for any injury or death during farming operations	3 months from date of application	Secretary Market Committee	Sub Divisional Magistrate of the Concerned SubDivision	Additional Deputy Commissioner (General)/Deputy Commissioner of the Concerned District
153	Agriculture/Mandi Board	Issue of I.Card to farmers for participation of Apni Mandi	15 days	In Chandigarh Secretary Apni Mandi In Punjab Secretary Market Committees	In Chandigarh General Manager (Project) In Punjab Sub-Divisional Magistrate of the Concerned SubDivision	In Chandigarh Secretary Punjab Mandi Board In Punjab Additional Deputy Commissioner (General)/Deputy Commissioner of the Concerned District.
154	Agriculture/Mandi Board	Issuance and renewal of license for sale of seeds/ fertilizers/ insecticides	24 Days	Chief Agriculture Office	Joint Director, Agriculture (HYVP, Inputs and PP)	Director, Agriculture Punjab
155	Agriculture/Mandi Board	Addition of Godown in seeds/fertilizers/ insecticides licenses	24 Days	Chief Agriculture Officer	Joint Director, Agriculture (HYVP, Inputs and PP)	Director, Agriculture Punjab
156	Agriculture/Mandi Board	Issuance of Duplicate agricultural license of seeds/fertilizers/insecticides	24 Days	Chief Agriculture Officer	Joint Director, Agriculture (HYVP, Inputs and PP)	Director, Agriculture Punjab
157	Agriculture/Mandi Board	Addition/amendment of item in license for Seeds/fertilizers/insecticides	15 Days	Chief Agriculture Officer	Joint Director, Agriculture (HYVP, Inputs and PP)	Director, Agriculture Punjab
158	Animal Husbandry,Fisheries &Dairy Dev. (Gadvasu University)	Supply of Medicine/ Vaccines at designated Hospital as decided by Govt.	Same day, subject to availability of Medicines/ Vaccines and Funds	Veterinary Doctor Incharge	Sub Divisional Magistrate of the Concerned SubDivision	Additional Deputy Commissioner (General)/Deputy Commissioner of the
159	Animal Husbandry,Fisheries &Dairy Dev. (Gadvasu University)	To provide artificial insemination subject to availability of semen	Same Day	Veterinary Doctor	Senior Veterinary Doctor In charge (SVO)	Deputy Commissioner
160	Animal Husbandry,Fisheries &Dairy Dev. (Gadvasu University)	Issue of veterinary health certificate to livestock owner	3 Days	Veterinary Doctor	Senior Veterinary Doctor (SVO)	Deputy Commissioner
161.a	School Education	School Leaving Certificate : Affiliated Schools & Boards Adarsh Schools	7 days	Headmaster/Headmistress/Principal	District Education Officer Concerned	Secretary to PSEB
161.b	School Education	Government Schools/Aided Schools	7 days	Headmaster/Headmistress/Principal	District Education Officer Concerned	DPI(S)
162.a	School Education	Issuance of Duplicate Certificate	20 days	Superintendent (duplicate Certificate Branch) PSEB	Deputy Director/Deputy	Secretary Computer Secretary of the Education Board
162.b	School Education	Duplicate Certificate with change in particulars e.g. correction in DOB, Mother's name, Father's name etc.	45 days	Superintendent (duplicate Certificate Branch) PSEB	Deputy Director/Deputy Secretary Computer	Secretary of the Education Board
163.a	School Education	Issuance of Original Migration Certificate/Detailed Marks Cards.	15 days	Superintendent (Examination Branch) PSEB	Deputy Director/Deputy Secretary (Examination)	Secretary of the Education Board
163.b	School Education	Verification of Certificates	21 days	Superintendent (Verification Branch) PSEB	Deputy Director/Deputy Secretary (Computer)	Secretary of the Education Board
164	School Education	Publication of Text Books	4 Months	Chairman, Punjab School Education Board	Principal secretary School Education	Chief secretary
165	Higher Education/Animal Husbandry, Fisheries &Dairy Dev. (Gadvasu University)	Issuance of Duplicate Certificate	30 days	Registrar	Vice Chancellor	Principal secretary, Higher Education / Financial Commissioner, Development in case of Gadvasu university
166	Higher Education/Animal Husbandry, Fisheries &Dairy Dev. (Gadvasu University)	Issuance of Original Migration Certificate/Detailed Marks Cards/ Verifications of Documents	15 days	Registrar	Vice Chancellor	Principal secretary, Higher Education / Financial Commissioner, Development in case of Gadvasu university
167	Higher Education/Animal Husbandry,Fisheries &Dairy Dev. (Gadvasu University)	Degrees of Successful Candidates	By 31 October every year	Registrar	Vice Chancellor	Principal secretary, Higher Education / Financial Commissioner, Development in case of Gadvasu university
168	Industries/Punja b Small Industries & Export Corporation Limited	Sanction of Water Supply and Sewerage Connection	10 days	Executive Engineer	Sub Divisional Magistrate / Additional Deputy Commissioner (General)	District Deputy Commissioner
169	Industries/Punjab Small Industries & Export Corporation Limited	Mortgage Ist Charge	15 days	Chief General Manager (Estate)	Sub Divisional Magistrate / Additional Deputy Commissioner (General)	District Deputy Commissioner
170	Industries/Punjab Small Industries & Export Corporation Limited	Registration of Lease/Conveyance Deed	15 days	Estate Officer	Sub Divisional Magistrate / Additional Deputy Commissioner (General)	District Deputy Commissioner
171	Industries/Punjab Small Industries & Export Corporation Limited	Conversion from lease to Free hold	30 days	Managing Director	Director Industries	Principal secretary Industries & Commerce
172	Power/ Electricity	Normal fuse off call/complaint	Cities and towns/ urban areas- within 4 hours. Rural Area:- Within 8 hours	Concerned Lineman	Consumer Disputes Settlement Committee	Consumer Grievances Redressal Forum
173	Power/ Electricity	Overhead line breakdowns	Cities and towns/ urban areas-within 8 hours Rural Area:- Within 12 hours.	JE / Incharge of area	Consumer Disputes Settlement Committee	Consumer Grievances Redressal Forum
174	Power/Electricity	Breakdowns due to breakage of poles	Cities and towns/ urban areas- within 12 hours Rural Area:- Within 24 hours.	JE / Incharge of area	Consumer Disputes Settlement Committee	Consumer Grievances Redressal Forum
175	Power/Electricity	Underground cable breakdowns	Cities, towns/ urban and rural area-Within 48 hours.	JE / Incharge of area	Consumer Disputes Settlement Committee	Consumer Grievances Redressal Forum
176	Power/Electricity	Distribution Transformer failure	Cities and towns/ urban areas-within 24 hours Rural Area:- Within 48 hours.	JE / Incharge of area	Consumer Disputes Settlement Committee	Consumer Grievances Redressal Forum
177	Power/Electricity	Power Transformer failure(with primary voltage up to 66000 volts)	within 15 days	Sr. Xen /Grid Const.	Consumer Disputes Settlement Committee	Consumer Grievances Redressal Forum
178	Power/Electricity	Street Light Faults	i)Rectification of line faults within 4 hours ii) Replacement of defective units within 24 hours	JE / Incharge of area	Consumer Disputes Settlement Committee	Consumer Grievances Redressal Forum
179.a	Power/Electricity	Period of Schedule Outage: Maximum duration in a single stretch	Not to exceed 6 hours in a day from April to October and 10 hrs in a day during the months from November to March	JE / Incharge of area	Consumer Disputes Settlement Committee	Consumer Grievances Redressal Forum
179.b	Power/Electricity	Restoration of Supply	Not later than 6.00 P.m.	JE / Incharge of area	Consumer Disputes Settlement Committee	Consumer Grievances Redressal Forum
180	Power/Electricity	Voltage fluctuations : No expansion/ enhancement of network involved	Within 2 days	JE / Incharge of area	Consumer Disputes Settlement Committee	Consumer Grievances Redressal Forum
181.a	Power/Electricity	Meter Complaints: Inspection and replacement of slow, fast/ creeping, stuck up meters	Inspection within 7 days and replacement within 10 days of receipt of complaint	JE / Incharge of area	Consumer Disputes Settlement Committee	Consumer Grievances Redressal Forum
181.b	Power/Electricity	Replacement of burnt meters	Within 5 days	JE / Incharge of area	Consumer Disputes Settlement Committee	Consumer Grievances Redressal Forum
182.a	Power/Electricity	Release of new connection/additional load/demand feasible from existing network: Release of supply	Within 24 days	AE/AEE incharge of area/function	Consumer Disputes Settlement Committee	Consumer Grievances Redressal Forum
182.b	Power/Electricity	Network expansion/enhancement requirement to release supply: Release of supply-Low Tension	Within 35 days	AE/AEE incharge of area/function	Consumer Disputes Settlement Committee	Consumer Grievances Redressal Forum
182.c	Power/Electricity	Release of supply-High Tension 11000 volts	Within 50 days	AE/AEE incharge of area/function	Consumer Disputes Settlement Committee	Consumer Grievances Redressal Forum
182.d	Power/Electricity	Release of supply-High Tension 33000 volts	Within 80 days	AE/AEE incharge of area/function	Consumer Disputes Settlement Committee	Consumer Grievances Redressal Forum
182.e	Power/Electricity	Release of supply-Extra High Tension	Within 105 days	AE/AEE incharge of area/function	Consumer Disputes Settlement Committee	Consumer Grievances Redressal Forum
182.f	Power/Electricity	Erection of Sub station required for release of supply	within the interval approved by the Commission	AE/AEE incharge of area/function	Consumer Disputes Settlement Committee	Consumer Grievances Redressal Forum
182.g	Power/Electricity	Issue of No Objection Certificate for release of connections in the colonies being developed by Developers/Builders/Societies/ owners/ Associations of Residents	45 days	Nodal Officer/ Commercial	Consumer Disputes Settlement Committee	Consumer Grievances Redressal Forum
183.a	Power/Electricity	Transfer of title and conversion of services: Transfer of title and/or change of category	within 7 days in case of LT consumer and 14 days in case HT/EHT consumers	AE/AEE incharge of area/function	Consumer Disputes Settlement Committee	Consumer Grievances Redressal Forum
183.b	Power/Electricity	Conversion from LT single phase to LT three phase or vice versa	Within 30 days	AE/AEE incharge of area/function	Consumer Disputes Settlement Committee	Consumer Grievances Redressal Forum
183.c	Power/Electricity	Conversion from LT to HT or vice Versa	Within 60 days	AE/AEE incharge of area/function	Consumer Disputes Settlement Committee	Consumer Grievances Redressal Forum
183.d	Power/Electricity	Conversion from HT to EHT or vice versa	Within 120 days	AE/AEE incharge of area/function	Consumer Disputes Settlement Committee	Consumer Grievances Redressal Forum
183.e	Power/Electricity	Approval of supply/Use of power from roof top Solar Photo voltaic projects installed by consumers as per Net Metering Policy notified by PSERC	30 days	Nodal Officer/ Commercial	Consumer Disputes Settlement Committee	Consumer Grievances Redressal Forum
184.a	Power/Electricity	Shifting of Meter/Service Connection & Other services: Shifting of Meter	within premises Within 3 days	AE/AEE incharge of area/function	Consumer Disputes Settlement Committee	Consumer Grievances Redressal Forum
184.b	Power/Electricity	Shifting of service Connection LT Connection HT Connection	10 days 20 Days	AE/AEE incharge of area/function	Consumer Disputes Settlement Committee	Consumer Grievances Redressal Forum
184.c	Power/Electricity	Shifting of LT/HT lines up to 11 kV	Within 20 days	AE/AEE incharge of area/function	Consumer Disputes Settlement Committee	Consumer Grievances Redressal Forum
184.d	Power/Electricity	Shifting of HT line exceeding 11 kV Within	30 days	AE/AEE incharge of area/function	Consumer Disputes Settlement Committee	Consumer Grievances Redressal Forum
184.e	Power/Electricity	Shifting of distribution Transformer Within	30 days	AE/AEE incharge of area/function	Consumer Disputes Settlement Committee	Consumer Grievances Redressal Forum
184.f	Power/Electricity	Implementation of Permanent Disconnection Order (PDCO) on the request of the Consumer.	7 days	AE/AEE incharge of area/function	Consumer Disputes Settlement Committee	Consumer Grievances Redressal Forum
185.a	Power/Electricity	Complaints about Consumer's Bills & Restoration of Supply: Resolution of complaints on disputed electricity bill	i)within 24 hrs if no additional information is required ii) Within 7 days if additional information is required	ARA / RA	Consumer Disputes Settlement Committee	Consumer Grievances Redressal Forum
185.b	Power/Electricity	Reconnection of supply following disconnection due to nonpayment of bills	Within 24 hours	JE/ Incharge of area	Consumer Disputes Settlement Committee	Consumer Grievances Redressal Forum
185.c	Power/Electricity	Refund/adjustment of arrears on account of energy bills	15 days	AE/AEE incharge of area/function	Consumer Disputes Settlement Committee	Consumer Grievances Redressal Forum
185.d	Power/Electricity	Refund/Closing of consumer's accounts against deposit works after completion of work/release of connection etc.	60 days	AE/AEE incharge of area/function	Consumer Disputes Settlement Committee	Consumer Grievances Redressal Forum
185.e	Power/electricity	Testing of challenged meter in ME Lab on the request of consumer i. LT meters ii. HT / EHT meters	15 days 30 days	AE/AEE incharge of area/function	Consumer Disputes Settlement Committee	Consumer Grievances Redressal Forum
185.f	Power/electricity	Replacement of damaged/burnt CT/PT Units i. 11 kV ii. 66 kV & above	15 days 30 days	AE/AEE incharge of area/function	Consumer Disputes Settlement Committee	Consumer Grievances Redressal Forum
185.g	Power/electricity	Testing of private meter in ME Lab after deposit of testing fee by the consumer i. LT meters ii. HT / EHT meters	15 days 30 days	AE/AEE incharge of area/function	Consumer Disputes Settlement Committee	Consumer Grievances Redressal Forum
185.h	Power/Electricity	To issue No Objection / Consent within 12 working days for allowing Open Access to consumers by SLDC.	12 days	Sr. Xen/ Open Access	Consumer Disputes Settlement Committee	Consumer Grievances Redressal Forum
186	Town & Country Planning	NOC in case of Petrol Pump/ Rice Sheller/Brick Kiln	15 days	District Town Planner/Deputy District Town Planner	Additional Deputy Commissioner (General )	District Deputy Commissioner
187	Town & Country Planning	CLU (Where Master Plan is notified and Local Planning areas are not notified. Residential, Industrial, Institutional Purpose : up to 25 acres and Commercial (excluding multiplex and shopping mall up to 2 acres)	23 days	Concerned Senior Town Planner	Chief Town Planner, Punjab	Director, Town and Country Planning Punjab (DTCP)
188.a	Town & Country Planning	Building Plans up to 500 m^{2}	15 days	District Town Planner/Deputy Town Planner	Additional Deputy Commissioner (General )	District Deputy Commissioner
188.b	Town & Country Planning	500 – 5000 m^{2}	15 days	Senior Town Planner	Chief Town Planner, Punjab	Director Town and Country Planning, Pb.
188.c	Town & Country Planning	Up to 5000 – 10000 m^{2}	45 days	Chief Town Planner	Director Town and Country Planning, Punjab	Principal secretary, Housing & Urban Dev. Department
188.d	Town & Country Planning	Sanction of building plans above 10000 square meters	60 days	Chief Town Planner	Director Town and Country Planning, Punjab	Principal secretary, Housing & Urban Dev. Department
189.a	Town & Country Planning	Completion/Partial Completion Certificate: up to 500 m^{2}	15 days	District Town Planner	Additional Deputy Commissioner (General)	District Deputy Commissioner
189.b	Town & Country Planning	500 – 5000 m^{2}	15 days	Senior Town Planner	Chief Town Planner, Pb.	Director, Town & Country Planning, Pb.
189.c	Town & Country Planning	More than 5000 m^{2}	23 days	Chief Town Planner, Pb.	Director Town & Country Planning Pb.	Principal secretary, Housing & Urban Dev. Department
189.d	Town & Country Planning	Issue of Completion/Partial Completion certificate above 10000 square meters	30 days	Chief Town Planner	Director Town and Country Planning, Punjab	Principal secretary, Housing & Urban Dev. Department
190	Town & Country Planning	Land use classification	5 days	Concerned District Town Planner	Additional Deputy Commissioner (General)	District Deputy Commissioner
191	All Departments (General)	General Service (Rectification of Error occurred at the Level of an Official while delivering the services)	5 days or the original time limit fixed for delivery of that service whichever is earlier.	Same as earlier notified for a particular service.	Same as earlier notified for a particular service	Same as earlier notified for a particular service.
192	Grievances & Pensions	Acknowledgement of all complaints	Immediately if given personally/ 7 days in others cases	District Head of each Department	Additional Deputy Commissioner (General )	Deputy Commissioner
193	Rural Development and Panchayat	Issuance of Job Card under MGNREGA	15 Days	Panchayat Secretary	Block Development and Panchayat Officer -cum -Programme Officer	Deputy Commissioner Cum- District Programme Coordinator
194	Rural Development and Panchayat	Rural Area Certificate	15 days	Tehsildar	Sub Divisional Magistrate	District Deputy Commissioner
195	Industry department	(a) Registration of Societies under the Society Registration Act, XXI of 1860 at District level	10 days	GM	ADC	District Deputy Commissioner
196	Industry department	(a) Registration of Societies under the Society Registration Act- XXI of 1860 at Headquarter Level	15 days	Registrar	Joint Director Industry	Director Industries
197	Industry department	Registration of New Firms	Headquarter: 15 days	Registrar	Director Industries	Principal secretary Industries
198	Technical Education	Issue of duplicate certificates / verification of certificates by ITIs	Within 7 days after the receipt of application	Controller Examination (ITI), PSBTE & IT	Secretary of Board	Director, Technical Education
199	Technical Education	Result declaration of (Reevaluation)	Within 21 days from date of receipt of Re-evaluation form. (Time period is not applicable in discrepancy cases)	Controller of Exam of the Concerned university	Registrar of the Concerned university	VC of the Concerned university
200	Technical Education	Issue of Provisional Degree and Migration certificate and Attestation of DMCs/Degree.	Within 3 days from receipt of Application	Controller of Exam.of the concerned University	Registrar of the Concerned university	VC of the Concerned university
201	Technical Education	Issue of official transcript	Within 15 days from receipt of Application	Controller of Exam.of the concerned University	Registrar of the Concerned university	VC of the Concerned university
202	Technical Education	Verification of qualification certificates and issue of Detail Marks Card.	Within 10 days from receipt of Application	Controller of Exam.of the concerned University	Registrar of the Concerned university	VC of the Concerned university
203	Technical Education	Issuance of different types of certificates to students of ITIs/Polytechnics	Within 3 days from receipt of Application	Principal	Additional Deputy Commissioner(General )	District Deputy Commissioner
204	Technical Education	Award of Provisional Diploma Certificate and Character Certificate to eligible candidates.	Within 3 days from receipt of Application	Principal	Additional Director	Director Technical Education
205	Technical Education	Verification of Diploma/Degree Certificates	Within 3 days after the confirmation from Board/PTU	DTE	Additional Secretary	Secretary, Technical Education
206	Dairy Development	Disposal of Application for the registration/ renewal as Dealer under Cattle feed, concentrates and mineral mixture Order 1988	Within 30 days from receipt of application if found in order.	Dy. Director Dairy	Additional Deputy Commissioner (General)	District Deputy Commissioner
207	Excise and Taxation	Grant of Registration Certificate	30 days	ETO-cum Designated Officer	Deputy Excise & Taxation Commissioner of Division concerned	Additional Excise & Taxation Commissioner (VAT), Punjab
208	Excise and Taxation	Amendment in Registration Certificate	30 days	ETO-cum Designated Officer	Deputy Excise & Taxation Commissioner of Division concerned	Additional Excise & Taxation Commissioner (VAT), Punjab
209	Excise and Taxation	Issue of Duplicate Registration Certificate	30 days	ETO-cum Designated Officer	Deputy Excise & Taxation Commissioner of Division concerned Commissioner (Excise), Punjab	Additional Excise & Taxation Commissioner (VAT), Punjab
210	Excise and Taxation	Cancellation of Registration Certificate	30 days	ETO-cum Designated Officer	Deputy Excise & Taxation Commissioner of Division concerned	Additional Excise & Taxation Commissioner (VAT), Punjab
211	Excise and Taxation	Permission for Business by a casual dealer	5 days	ETO-cum Designated Officer	Deputy Excise & Taxation Commissioner of Division concerned	Additional Excise & Taxation Commissioner (VAT), Punjab
212	Excise and Taxation	Request for extension of period of casual business	2 days	ETO-cum Designated Officer	Deputy Excise & Taxation Commissioner of Division concerned	Additional Excise & Taxation Commissioner (VAT), Punjab
213	Excise and Taxation	Allotment of Tax Deduction Number in case of Works Contract	30 days	ETO-cum Designated Officer	Deputy Excise & Taxation Commissioner of Division concerned	Additional Excise & Taxation Commissioner (VAT), Punjab
214	Excise and Taxation	Supply of Assessment Orders/Penalty Orders/Refund Orders	15 days	Excise & Taxation Officer/ Asst. Excise & Taxation Commissioner as the case may be	Deputy Excise & Taxation Commissioner of Division concerned	Additional Excise & Taxation Commissioner (VAT), Punjab
215	Excise and Taxation	Obtaining additional certified copy of order	30 days	ETO-cum Designated Officer	Deputy Excise & Taxation Commissioner of Division concerned	Additional Excise & Taxation Commissioner (VAT), Punjab
216	Excise and Taxation	Obtaining copy of statement recorded in any enquiry held under PVAT Rules	30 days	ETO-cum Designated Officer	Deputy Excise & Taxation Commissioner of Division concerned	Additional Excise & Taxation Commissioner (VAT), Punjab
217	Excise and Taxation	Issuance of Advance Tax Exemption Certificate	60 days	DETC of the Division concerned or Officer authorized by Excise and Taxation Commissioner, Punjab	Additional Excise & Taxation Commissioner (VAT), Punjab	Excise & Taxation Commissioner, Punjab
218	Excise and Taxation	Renewal of Advance Tax Exemption Certificate	30 days	DETC of the Division concerned or Officer authorized by Excise and Taxation Commissioner, Punjab	Additional Excise & Taxation Commissioner (VAT), Punjab	Excise & Taxation Commissioner, Punjab
219	Excise and Taxation	Registration under Luxury Tax	30 days	ETO (Excise)	Deputy Excise & Taxation Commissioner of Division concerned	Additional Excise & Taxation Commissioner (VAT), Punjab
220	Excise and Taxation	Hard Bar License	60 days	Deputy Excise & Taxation Commissioner of the concerned Division–cum-Collector Excise	Joint Excise & Taxation Commissioner (X`), Punjab	Addl. Excise & Taxation Commissioner (X), Punjab
221	Excise and Taxation	Beer Bar License	60 days	Deputy Excise & Taxation Commissioner of the concerned Division–cum-Collector	Joint Excise & Taxation Commissioner (Excise), Punjab	Addl. Excise & Taxation Commissioner (Excise), Punjab
222	Excise and Taxation	Drought Beer Bar License	60 days	Deputy Excise & Taxation Commissioner of the concerned Division–cum-Collector	Joint Excise & Taxation Commissioner (Excise), Punjab	Addl. Excise & Taxation Commissioner (Excise), Punjab
223	Excise and Taxation	Annual License to Marriage Palaces	30 days	Deputy Excise & Taxation Commissioner of the concerned Division–cum-Collector	Joint Excise & Taxation Commissioner (Excise), Punjab	Addl. Excise & Taxation Commissioner (Excise), Punjab
224	Excise and Taxation	Bar License to Clubs	60 days	Deputy Excise & Taxation Commissioner of the concerned Division–cum-Collector	Joint Excise & Taxation Commissioner (Excise), Punjab	Addl. Excise & Taxation Commissioner (Excise), Punjab
225	Excise and Taxation	Permission to serve liquor in marriage or banquet hall to a function holder	2 days	Excise & Taxation Officer (Excise) of concerned district	Joint Excise & Taxation Commissioner (Excise), Punjab	Deputy Excise & Taxation Commissioner
226	Excise and Taxation	Permit for industrial Alcohol to Chemical industries etc.	60 days	Deputy Excise & Taxation Commissioner	Joint Excise & Taxation Commissioner (Excise), Punjab	Addl. Excise & Taxation Commissioner (Excise), Punjab
227	Labour	Registration under the Contract Labour (Regulation & Abolition) Act, 1970 after receipt of duly completed application along with prescribed fee	30 days	Additional Labour Commissioner / Deputy Labour Commissioner / Assistant Labour Commissioner / Labour cumconciliation Officer	Labour Commissioner	Principal secretary Labour
228	Labour	Registration under the Contract Labour (Regulation & Abolition) Act, 1970 after receipt of duly completed application along with prescribed fee	30 days	Additional Labour Commissioner / Deputy Labour Commissioner / Assistant Labour Commissioner / Labour cumconciliation Officer	Labour Commissioner	Principal secretary Labour
229	Labour	Registration under the Contract Labour (Regulation & Abolition) Act, 1970 after receipt of duly completed application along with prescribed fee	30 days	Additional Labour Commissioner / Deputy Labour Commissioner / Assistant Labour Commissioner / Labour cumconciliation Officer	Labour Commissioner	Principal secretary Labour
230	Labour	Registration under Punjab Shops and Commercial Establishments Act, 1958	30 days	Labour Inspector	Deputy Labour Commissioner	Additional Labour Commissioner
231	Labour	Registration under the Trade Unions Act after receipt of duly completed application with documents along with prescribed fee	90 days	Labour Commissioner	Special Secretary Labour	Principal secretary Labour
232	Labour(Factory wing)	Acceptance of plans of new factory building after receipt of complete documents	30 days	Director of Factories, Punjab	Special Secretary Labour	Principal secretary Labour
233	Labour (Factory wing)	Registration of Factory to run factory after receipt of complete documents along with prescribed fee	15 days	Deputy/Assistant Director of Factories	Joint Director of Factories	Additional Director of Factories
234	Labour (Factory wing)	Grant of Factory Licence to run factory after receipt of complete documents along with prescribed fee	15 days	Deputy/Assistant Director of Factories	Joint Director of Factories	Additional Director of Factories
235	Labour(Factory wing)	Renewal of Factory licence, after receipt of complete documents along with prescribed fee	60 days	Deputy/Assistant Director of Factories	Joint Director of Factories	Additional Director of Factories
236.a	Forests & Wildlife Preservation	Processing of proposals for diversion of forest land under Forest Conservation Act, 1980	30 days – (For Office ofDivisional Forest Officer)	Divisional Forest Officer	Conservator of Forest	Nodal Officer
			7 days- (For Office of Conservator of Forests)	Conservator of Forest	Nodal Officer	Principal Chief Conservator of Forest
			7 days – (For office of Nodal Officer/PCCF)	Nodal Officer	Principal Chief Conservator of Forest	Secretary Forests
			7 days – (For Secretary, Forest)	Deputy/Joint/Addl./Special Secretary Forests	Secretary Forests	Financial Commissioner, Forests
236.b	PWD, Irrigation,Drainage and other land owning Departments	Issue NOC for the FCA proposal to Forest Department for ‘236 a’ above.	15 days	Executive Engineer	Superintendent Engineer	Chief Engineer
237	Forests & Wildlife Preservation	NOC to be sent to the Competent Authority cum Site Appraisal Committee for site clearance of Industries.	15 days	Divisional Forest Officer	Conservator of Forest	Chief Conservator of Forest
238	Forests & Wildlife Preservation	NOC to be sent to the District Magistrate for issuing Gun license.	15 days	Divisional Forest Officer (WL)	Conservator of Forest (WL)	Chief Wild Life Warden
239	Forests & Wildlife Preservation	Supply of Plants from Forest Nurseries.	3 days	Range Forest Officer	Divisional Forest Officer	Conservator of Forest
240.a	Forests & Wildlife Preservation	Issue of permit for felling of trees in the areas notified under Punjab Land Preservation Act, 1900 as per the Punjab Govt. Policy and Felling Programme.	30 days(for office of Divisional Forest Officer)	Divisional Forest Officer	Conservator of Forest	Chief Conservator of Forest
		I. Up to 40 hectares	60 days	Divisional Forest Officer	Conservator of Forest	Chief Conservator of Forest
		II. Up to 100 hectares	75 days	Divisional Forest Officer	Conservator of Forest	Chief Conservator of Forest
		III. More than 100 hectare.	90 days	Divisional Forest Officer	Conservator of Forest	Chief Conservator of Forest
240.b	Revenue	Revenue officials will demarcate the land jointly with Forest Department and Land Owners for ‘A’ above.	30 days	Field Kanungo/Patwari	Naib Tehsildar/Tehsildar	SDM (C)
241	Industries & Commerce (Directorate of Industries)	Allotment of plots	45 days from close of advertisement inviting applications and another 15 days for issuance of allotment letter by Department of Industries & Commerce.	Chief Co-ordinator, Udyog Sahyak	Director of Industries Punjab	Principal secretary Industries & Commerce Punjab
242	Industries & Commerce (Directorate of Industries)	Certification/Inspection of Boilers	30 days from the date of receipt of application from the concerned Industrial Unit.	Director Boiler	Industrial Adviser, Department of Industries Punjab	Director of Industries Punjab
243	Industries & Commerce (Directorate of Industries)	Mortgage/ First Charge on Industrial Plots.	15 days	General manager, District Industries Center concerned.	Additional Deputy Commissioner (General)	District Deputy Commissioner
244	Industries & Commerce (Directorate of Industries)	Issuance of No Due Certificate	15 days	General manager, District Industries Center concerned.	Additional Deputy Commissioner (General)	District Deputy Commissioner
245	Industries & Commerce (Directorate of Industries)	Transfer of Industrial Plots where conveyance deed has already been executed in Industrial Area, Industrial Estates and Industrial Development Colony in the State of Punjab (through original allottee)	i) Undisputed- 7 days ii) Disputed- 45 Days	General manager, District Industries Center concerned.	Additional Deputy Commissioner (General)	District Deputy Commissioner
246	Industries & Commerce (Directorate of Industries)	Transfer of Industrial Plots where conveyance deed has already been executed in Industrial Area, Industrial Estates and Industrial Development Colony in the State of Punjab (through GPA)	i) Undisputed- 7 days ii) Disputed- 45 Days	General manager, District Industries Center concerned.	Additional Deputy Commissioner (General)	District Deputy Commissioner
247	Industries & Commerce (Directorate of Industries)	Transfer of Industrial Plots where conveyance deed has already been executed in Industrial Area, Industrial Estates and Industrial Development Colony in the State of Punjab (within family/blood relation)	i) Undisputed- 7 days ii) Disputed- 45 Days	General manager, District Industries Center concerned.	Additional Deputy Commissioner (General)	District Deputy Commissioner
248	Industries & Commerce (Directorate of Industries)	Grant of Conveyance deed to the allottees of Industrial Plot in the State for the first time on successful start of industrial activity and payment of Govt. dues	30 days	General manager, District Industries Center concerned.	Additional Deputy Commissioner (General)	District Deputy Commissioner
249	Industries & Commerce (Directorate of Industries)	Permission for renting of portion of Industrial Plot in Focal Points.	15 days	General manager, District Industries Center concerned.	Additional Deputy Commissioner (General)	District Deputy Commissioner
250	Industries & Commerce (Directorate of Industries)	Permission for Change of End Product in Focal Points	7 days	General manager, District Industries Center concerned.	Additional Deputy Commissioner (General)	District Deputy Commissioner
251	Industries & Commerce (Directorate of Industries)	Grant of License under Lubricating and Grease Control Order, 1987.	15 days	General manager, District Industries Center concerned.	Additional Deputy Commissioner (General)	District Deputy Commissioner
252	Industries & Commerce (Directorate of Industries)	Entrepreneurship Memorandum Part-1 Under MSME Act, 2006	1 day	General manager, District Industries Center concerned.	Additional Deputy Commissioner (General)	District Deputy Commissioner
253	Industries & Commerce (Directorate of Industries)	Entrepreneurship Memorandum Part-2 Under MSME Act,2006	1 day	General manager, District Industries Center concerned.	Additional Deputy Commissioner (General)	District Deputy Commissioner
254	Industries & Commerce (Directorate of Industries)	Issue of No Due Certificate to the outstanding loanees who have availed Loans from the Department under Punjab State Aid to Industries Act, 1935, Seed Margin Money and Handloom cases.	15 days	General manager, District Industries Center concerned.	Additional Deputy Commissioner (General)	District Deputy Commissioner
255	Industries & Commerce (Directorate of Industries)	Issuance of I-Card to Handloom Weavers and Artisans	10 days	General manager, District Industries Center concerned.	Additional Deputy Commissioner (General)	District Deputy Commissioner
256	Industries & Commerce (Directorate of Industries)	NOC/Permission for sale of Industrial Plot in Industrial Area, Industrial Estate and Industrial Development Colony.	10 days	General manager, District Industries Center concerned.	Additional Deputy Commissioner (General)	District Deputy Commissioner
257	Industries & Commerce (Punjab Infotech)	Allotment of plots	45 days from close of advertisement inviting applications and another 15 days for issuance of allotment letter by Punjab Infotech	Chief coordinator, Udyog Sahyak	Director of Industries Punjab	Principal secretary Industries & Commerce Punjab
258	Industries & Commerce (Punjab Infotech)	Issuance of No Due Certificate	15 days	General manager concerned	MD, Punjab Infotech	Principal secretary Industries & Commerce
259	Industries & Commerce (Punjab Infotech)	Transfer of industrial plot through original allottee	30 days	General manager concerned	MD, Punjab Infotech	Principal secretary Industries & Commerce
260	Industries & Commerce (Punjab Infotech)	Transfer of industrial plot through GPA	30 days.	General manager concerned	MD, Punjab Infotech	Principal secretary Industries & Commerce
261	Industries & Commerce (Punjab Infotech)	Transfer of plot within family/blood relation	30 days	General manager concerned	MD, Punjab Infotech	Principal secretary Industries & Commerce
262	Industries & Commerce (Punjab Infotech)	NOC/ Permission to sale of industrial plot	21 days	General manager concerned	MD, Punjab Infotech	Principal secretary Industries & Commerce
263	Industries & Commerce (Punjab Infotech)	Providing of calculations for OTS amount after receipt of a request in this regard.	2 days from the date of receipt of application from the concerned Loanee/Industrial Unit.	GM concerned, Punjab Infotech	MD, Punjab Infotech	Principal secretary Industries & Commerce Punjab
264	Industries & Commerce (Punjab Infotech)	Issuance of acceptance letter for OTS after receipt of application with requisite down payment	7 days	GM concerned, Punjab Infotech	MD, Punjab Infotech	Principal secretary Industries & Commerce Punjab
265	Industries & Commerce (Punjab Infotech)	Reply to the Bond-holders in respect of non receipt of payment against bonds or any other query of the bond-holders.	7 days	GM concerned, Punjab Infotech	MD, Punjab Infotech	Principal secretary Industries & Commerce Punjab
266	Industries & Commerce (PSIEC)	Extension in time period for possession	15 days	Chief general manager (Estate)	Managing Director	Principal secretary Industries & Commerce
267	Industries & Commerce (PSIEC)	Issuance of No Due Certificate	15 days	Estate Officer	Chief general manager (Estate)	Managing Director, PSIEC
268	Industries & Commerce (PSIEC)	Transfer of industrial plot through original allottee	30 days	Managing Director	Director Industries	Principal secretary Industries & Commerce
269	Industries & Commerce (PSIEC)	Transfer of industrial plot through GPA	30 days.	Managing Director	Director Industries	Principal secretary Industries & Commerce
270	Industries & Commerce (PSIEC)	Transfer of plot within family/blood relation	30 days	Managing Director	Director Industries	Principal secretary Industries & Commerce
271	Industries & Commerce (PSIEC)	NOC/ Permission to sale of industrial plot	21 days	Managing Director	Director Industries	Principal secretary Industries & Commerce
272	Industries & Commerce (PSIEC)	Sanction of Building plan	30 days	General manager (Planning)	Managing Director	Principal secretary Industries & Commerce
273	Industries & Commerce (PSIEC)	Issuance of duplicate title documents	15 days	Estate Officer	Chief general manager (Estate)	Managing Director, PSIEC
274	Science, Technology & Environment (Punjab Pollution Control Board)	Grant of Consent to establish (NOC) to Small Scale Green Category Industry	15 days	Environmental Engineer	Senior Environmental Engineer	Chief Environmental Engineer(HQ)
275	Science, Technology & Environment (Punjab Pollution Control Board)	Grant of Consent to establish (NOC) to Small Scale Green Category Industry	15 days	Senior Environmental Engineer	Chief Environmental Engineer(HQ)	Member Secretary
276	Science, Technology & Environment (Punjab Pollution Control Board)	Grant of Consent to establish (NOC) to Small Scale Green Category Industry	15 days	Chief Environmental Engineer(HQ)	Member Secretary	Chairman
277	Science, Technology & Environment (Punjab Pollution Control Board)	Grant of Consent to establish (NOC) to Small Scale Orange Category Industry	15 days	Senior Environmental Engineer	Chief Environmental Engineer(HQ)	Member Secretary
278	Science, Technology & Environment (Punjab Pollution Control Board)	Grant of Consent to establish (NOC) to Small Scale Orange Category Industry	21 days	Chief Environmental Engineer(HQ)	Member Secretary	Chairman
279	Science, Technology & Environment (Punjab Pollution Control Board)	Grant of Consent to establish (NOC) to Large Scale Orange Category Industry	21 days	Chief Environmental Engineer(HQ)	Member Secretary	Chairman
280	Science, Technology & Environment (Punjab Pollution Control Board)	Grant of Consent to establish (NOC) to Small Scale Red Category Industry	15 days	Senior Environmental Engineer	Chief Environmental Engineer(HQ)	Member Secretary
281	Science, Technology & Environment (Punjab Pollution Control Board)	Grant of Consent to establish (NOC) to Medium Scale Red Category Industry	21 days	Chief Environmental Engineer	Member Secretary	Chairman
282.a	Science, Technology & Environment (Punjab Pollution Control Board)	Grant of Consent to establish (NOC) to Large Scale Red Category Industry Having total cost of project up to Rs.15.00 Crore	21 days	Member Secretary	Chairman	Special Secretary Science, Technology & Environment
282.b	Science, Technology & Environment (Punjab Pollution Control Board)	Grant of Consent to establish (NOC) to Large Scale Red Category Industry Having total cost of project more than Rs.15.00 Crore	21 days	Chairman	Special Secretary Science, Technology & Environment	Principal secretary Science, Technology & Environment
283	Science, Technology & Environment (Punjab Pollution Control Board)	Grant of Consent to operate to Small Scale Green Category Industry	15 days	Environmental Engineer	Senior Environmental Engineer	Chief Environmental Engineer(HQ)
284	Science, Technology & Environment (Punjab Pollution Control Board)	Grant of Consent to operate to Medium Scale Green Category Industry	15 days	Senior Environmental Engineer	Chief Environmental Engineer (HQ)	Member Secretary
285	Science, Technology & Environment (Punjab Pollution Control Board)	Grant of Consent to operate to Large Scale Green Category Industry	15 days	Chief Environmental Engineer	Member Secretary	Chairman
286	Science, Technology & Environment (Punjab Pollution Control Board)	Grant of Consent to operate to Small Scale Orange Category Industry	15 days	Senior Environmental Engineer	Chief Environmental Engineer(HQ)	Member Secretary
287	Science, Technology & Environment (Punjab Pollution Control Board)	Grant of Consent to operate to Medium Scale Orange Category Industry	30 days	Chief Environmental Engineer	Member Secretary	Chairman
288	Science, Technology & Environment (Punjab Pollution Control Board)	Grant of Consent to operate to Large Scale Orange Category Industry	30 days	Chief Environmental Engineer	Member Secretary	Chairman
289	Science, Technology & Environment (Punjab Pollution Control Board)	Grant of Consent to operate to Small Scale Red Category Industry	30 days	Senior Environmental Engineer	Chief Environmental Engineer(HQ)	Member Secretary
290	Science, Technology & Environment (Punjab Pollution Control Board)	Grant of Consent to operate to Medium Scale Red Category Industry	30 days	Chief Environmental Engineer	Member Secretary	Chairman
291.a	Science, Technology & Environment (Punjab Pollution Control Board)	Grant of Consent to operate to Large Scale Red Category Industry Having total cost of project up to Rs.15.00 Crore	30 days	Member Secretary	Chairman	Special Secretary Science, Technology & Environment
291.b	Science, Technology & Environment (Punjab Pollution Control Board)	Grant of Consent to operate to Large Scale Red Category Industry Having total cost of project more than Rs.15.00 Crore	30 days	Chairman	Special Secretary Science, Technology & Environment	Principal secretary Science, Technology & Environment
292	Science, Technology & Environment (Punjab Pollution Control Board)	Grant of Authorization under Hazardous Wastes (Management, Handling & Transboundary Movement) Rules, 2008	30 days	Senior Environmental Engineer	Chief Environmental Engineer (HQ)	Member Secretary
293.a	Science, Technology & Environment (Punjab Pollution Control Board)	Grant of Authorization under Bio Medical Wastes (Management & Handling) Amendment Rules, 2003 Up to 50 beds HCES and lab and Blood Banks, Pathological, etc.	30 days	Environmental Engineer	Senior Environmental Engineer/ Additional Secretary Science, Technology & Environment	Chief Environmental Engineer(HQ) Special Secretary Science, Technology & Environment
293.b	Science, Technology & Environment (Punjab Pollution Control Board)	Grant of Authorization under Bio Medical Wastes (Management & Handling) Amendment Rules, 2003 More than 50 beds but up to 200 beds	30 days	Senior Environmental Engineer/ Additional Secretary Science, Technology & Environment	Chief Environmental Engineer(HQ) Special Secretary Science, Technology & Environment	Chairman
293.c	Science, Technology & Environment (Punjab Pollution Control Board)	Grant of Authorization under Bio Medical Wastes (Management & Handling) Amendment Rules, 2003 More than 200 beds but up to 500 beds.	30 days	Chief Environmental Engineer(HQ) Special Secretary Science, Technology & Environment	Chairman	Special Secretary Science, Technology & Environment
293.d	Science, Technology & Environment (Punjab Pollution Control Board)	Grant of Authorization under Bio Medical Wastes (Management & Handling) Amendment Rules, 2003 More than 500 beds .	30 days	Member Secretary	Chairman	Special Secretary Science, Technology & Environment
294	Science, Technology & Environment (Punjab Pollution Control Board)	Grant of Registration for Manufacture of Carry Bags & Multi Layered Plastics under Plastic Wastes (Management & Handling) Rules, 2011	30 days	Environmental Engineer	Senior Environmental Engineer(HQ)	Chief Environmental Engineer(HQ)
295	Science, Technology & Environment (Punjab Pollution Control Board)	Grant of Registration for Recycling of Carry Bags & Multi Layered Plastics or any plastic waste under Plastic Wastes (Management & Handling) Rules, 2011	30 days	Environmental Engineer	Senior Environmental Engineer(HQ)	Chief Environmental Engineer(HQ)
296	Science, Technology & Environment (Punjab Pollution Control Board)	Grant of Authorization under ewaste (Management & Handling) Rules, 2011	30 days	Chairman	Special Secretary Science, Technology & Environment	Principal secretary Science, Technology & Environment
297	Science, Technology & Environment (Punjab Pollution Control Board)	Declaration of analysis results for the effluent / emissions samples collected	15 days	Senior Scientific Officer	Member Secretary	Chairman
298	Science, Technology & Environment (Punjab Pollution Control Board)	Providing effluent / emission analysis report after deposit of analysis fees	03 days	Environmental Engineer	Senior Environmental Engineer(HQ)	Chief Environmental Engineer (HQ)
299	Medical Education and Research/Punjab Medical Council	Provisional Registration (in case of Graduate from Punjab State)	15 days ( 2 days in emergent cases)	Registrar	Chairman	Director, Medical Education and Research.
300	Medical Education and Research/Punjab Medical Council	Provisional Registration (in case of Graduates from other States ) on receipt of NOC from the Medical Council of Concerned State	45 days	Registrar	Chairman	Director, Medical Education and Research.
301	Medical Education and Research/Punjab Medical Council	Permanent Registration (who are already registered provisionally by Punjab Medical Council)	15 days	Registrar	Chairman	Director, Medical Education and Research.
302	Medical Education and Research/Punjab Medical Council	Permanent Registration (who have already been registered provisionally/permanently by other States Medical Council) – on receipt of NOC from the Medical Council of Concerned State	45 days	Registrar	Chairman	Director, Medical Education and Research.
303	Medical Education and Research/Punjab Medical Council	Provisional /Permanent Registration ( in case of Graduate from other Countries) – on receipt of verification of Degree from the concerned Embassy	90 days	Registrar	Chairman	Director, Medical Education and Research.
304	Medical Education and Research/Punjab Medical Council	Issuance of Good Standing Certificate	15 days	Registrar	Chairman	Director, Medical Education and Research.
305	Medical Education and Research/Punjab Medical Council	Renewal of Registration	15 days	Registrar	Chairman	Director, Medical Education and Research.
306	Medical Education and Research/Punjab Medical Council	Issuance of NOC for Registration in other States.	15 days	Registrar	Chairman	Director, Medical Education and Research.
307	Medical Education and Research/Punjab Medical Council	Additional of Qualification Registration Certificate	15 days	Registrar	Chairman	Director, Medical Education and Research.
308	Medical Education and Research/Punjab Medical Council	Issuance of Duplicate Registration Certificate and other Certificates etc.	15 days	Registrar	Chairman,	Director, Medical Education and Research.
309	Medical Education and Research/Punjab Nurses Registration	Issuance of Detailed Marks Certificate (ANM, GNM)	60 days (After the Declaration of Result)	Registrar	Chairman	Director, Medical Education and Research
310	Medical Education and Research/Punjab Nurses Registration Council	Issuance of Registration Certificate (ANM,GNM.B.Sc Nursing, Post Basic B.Sc Nursing and M.Sc Nursing)	60 days	Registrar	Chairman,	Director, Medical Education and Research
311	Medical Education and Research/Punjab Nurses Registration Council	Issuance of Diploma Certificate (ANM and GNM)	60 days	Registrar	Chairman,	Director, Medical Education and Research
312	Medical Education and Research/Punjab Nurses Registration Council	Issuance of NOC for Transfer of Registration to other States	30 days	Registrar	Chairman	Director, Medical Education and Research
313	Medical Education and Research/Punjab Nurses Registration Council	Issuance of NOC on demand for Transfer of Registration from other States	30 days	Registrar	Chairman	Director, Medical Education and Research
314	Medical Education and Research/Punjab Nurses Registration Council	Forwarding Certificates for verification in India/ DC Office/Hospitals Concerned.	30 days	Registrar	Chairman	Director, Medical Education and Research
315	Medical Education and Research/Punjab Nurses Registration Council	Forwarding Certificate for Verification to other Countries	30 days	Registrar	Chairman	Director, Medical Education and Research
316	Medical Education and Research/Council of Homeopathic Systems of Medicines Punjab	Provisional Registration	15 days	Registrar	Chairman	Director Medical Education and Research
317	Medical Education and Research/Council of Homeopathic Systems of Medicines Punjab	Registration for Candidates of Punjab State Registration for Candidates from other States	15 days 15 days (After the receipt of verification from the concerned State)	Registrar	Chairman	Director, Medical Education and Research
318	Medical Education and Research/Council of Homeopathic Systems of Medicines Punjab	Renewal of Registration	30 days	Registrar	Chairman	Director Medical Education and Research
319	Medical Education and Research/Council of Homeopathic Systems of Medicines Punjab	Verification of NOC, Qualification and Registration	15 days (In case of already renewed cases) 15 days (After renewal in case of not already renewed cases)	Registrar	Chairman	Director Medical Education and Research
320	Medical Education and Research /Punjab State Pharmacy Council	Fresh Registration	60 days ( After receipt of verification of result and after the approval of Sub Committee).	Registrar	Vice Chairman	Chairman
321	Medical Education and Research /Punjab State Pharmacy Council	Registration by Transfer (Migration)	60 days ( After receipt of verification of result and after the approval of Sub Committee).	Registrar	Vice Chairman	Chairman
322	Medical Education and Research /Punjab State Pharmacy Council	Duplicate Registration Certificate	30 days	Registrar	Vice Chairman	Chairman
323	Medical Education and Research/Punjab State Pharmacy Council	Renewal / Restoration	60 days	Registrar	Vice Chairman	Chairman
324	Medical Education and Research/Punjab State Pharmacy Council	Issuance of Good Standing Certificate	30 days	Registrar	Vice Chairman	Chairman
325	Medical Education and Research/Punjab State Pharmacy Council	Addition of Qualification	60 days (After verification of qualification / results from the concerned Authority)	Registrar	Vice Chairman	Chairman
326	Medical Education and Research/Punjab State Pharmacy Council	Issue of NOC to Candidates qualified from Punjab for "Registration in other States."	60 days	Registrar	Vice Chairman	Chairman
327	Medical Education and Research/Punjab State Dental Council	New Registration-Punjabs State (BDS, MDS, Dental Mechanic and Dental Hygienist)	7 days	Registrar	Chairman	Director, Medical Education and Research
328	Medical Education and Research/Punjab State Dental Council	New Registration-Other States (BDS, MDS, Dental Mechanic and Dental Hygienist)	15 days (After verification of DMC/Degree from the concerned Colleges and Universities)	Registrar	Chairman	Director, Medical Education and Research
329	Medical Education and Research/Punjab State Dental Council	New Registration: Applied from Other Countries	15 days (After verification of DMC/Degree from the concerned Colleges and Universities)	Registrar	Chairman	Director, Medical Education and Research
330	Medical Education and Research /Punjab State Dental Council	Restoration of Registration	15 days	Registrar	Chairman	Director,Medical Education and Research
331	Medical Education and Research /Punjab State Dental Council	Renewal of Registration	3 days	Registrar	Chairman	Director,Medical Education and Research
332	Medical Education and Research/Punjab State Dental Council	Issue of NOC to Candidates qualified from Punjab for "Registration in other States."	7 days	Registrar	Chairman	Director, Medical Education and Research
333	Medical Education and Research /Punjab State Dental Council	Issuance of Good Standing Certificate	7 days	Registrar	Chairman	Director,Medical Education and Research
334	Medical Education and Research /Punjab State Dental Council	Issuance of Duplicate Certificate and Other Certificates	7 days	Registrar	Chairman	Director, Medical Education and Research
335	Medical Education and Research /Punjab State Dental Council	Issuance of Smart Card	Same day	Registrar	Chairman	Director, Medical Education and Research
336	Medical Education and Research /Board of Ayurvedic and Unani Systems of Medicines Punjab	Provisional Registration	15 days	Registrar	Vice Chairman	Chairman
337	Medical Education and Research /Board of Ayurvedic and Unani Systems of Medicines Punjab	Permanent Registration	30 days	Registrar	Vice Chairman	Chairman
338	Medical Education and Research /Board of Ayurvedic and Unani Systems of Medicines Punjab	Updation of Registration	30 days	Registrar	Vice Chairman	Chairman
339	Medical Education and Research /Board of Ayurvedic and Unani Systems of Medicines Punjab	Issue of NOC to Candidates qualified from Punjab for "Registration in other States"	30 days	Registrar	Vice Chairman	Chairman
340	Medical Education and Research /Board of Ayurvedic and Unani Systems of Medicines Punjab	Good Professional Certificate for further studies abroad	30 days	Registrar	Vice Chairman	Chairman
341	Medical Education and Research /Board of Ayurvedic and Unani Systems of Medicines Punjab	Registration of Candidates qualified from other State's Board	30 days (After the verification of result from the colleges/ universities and approval of Sub-Committee )	Registrar	Vice Chairman	Chairman
342	Medical Education and Research /Board of Ayurvedic and Unani Systems of Medicines Punjab	Addition of Qualification	30 days (After the verification of result from the colleges/ universities and approval of Sub-Committee )	Registrar	Vice Chairman	Chairman
343	Medical Education and Research /Board of Ayurvedic and Unani Systems of Medicines Punjab	Registration of UpVaids	30 says	Registrar	Vice Chairman	Chairman
344	Medical Education and Research /Board of Ayurvedic and Unani Systems of Medicines Punjab	Renewal of Registration (UpVaid)	30 days	Registrar	Vice Chairman	Chairman
345	Medical Education and Research /Punjab State Faculty of Ayurvedic and Unani Systems of Medicines	Issuance of DMC (D. Pharmacy and Ayurveda (UpVaid)	60 days (After the declaration of Result)	Member Secretary	Chairman	Secretary,Medical Education and Research
346	Medical Education and Research /Punjab State Faculty of Ayurvedic and Unani Systems of Medicines	Issuance of Diploma Certificate	60 days (After the declaration of Result)	Member Secretary	Chairman	Secretary, Medical Education and Research
347	Medical Education and Research /Punjab State Faculty of Ayurvedic and Unani Systems of Medicines	Issuance of Duplicate DMC	45 days	Member Secretary	Chairman	Secretary, Medical Education and Research
348	Medical Education and Research /Punjab State Faculty of Ayurvedic and Unani Systems of Medicines	Issuance of Duplicate Diploma Certificate	45 days	Member Secretary	Chairman	Secretary, Medical Education and Research
349	Medical Education and Research /Punjab State Faculty of Ayurvedic and Unani Systems of Medicines	Result Verification	20 days	Member Secretary	Chairman	Secretary, Medical Education and Research
350	Medical Education and Research /Punjab State Faculty of Ayurvedic and Unani Systems of Medicines	Issuance of Transcript Certificate	60 days	Member Secretary	Chairman	Secretary, Medical Education and Research
351	Medical Education and Research /Punjab State Faculty of Ayurvedic and Unani Systems of Medicines	Enrollment of Candidates after Admission	Up to 31 August (Every year)	Member Secretary	Chairman	Secretary, Medical Education and Research

=== Simplified application proforma ===
To avail the services a standardised and simplified application proforma was introduced for the convenience of the citizen. Earlier there were not only different types of proformas in different offices to avail these services but they varied also from district to districts. In addition to it earlier a lot of undesired documentation was involved in old proformas which was curtailed and documents specifically related to the service only were made mandatory in the simplified proformas. Specimen of the simplified proforma is given below: Simplified proforma for Services under RTS Act.

1	Name of Service
2	name of Department/Service Provider (Pre-filled into the system

Part 2
1	Name of Applicant
2	Husband/Father's/Mother's Name
3	Permanent Address
4	Correspondence Address
5	Correspondence Phone No.
6	Correspondence e-mail
7	Adhaar Card No.(Attach Copy)

Part-3 Information/Documents required specific to the service Information
1	name of beneficiary, if not applicant.(Adhar card of beneficiary. Attach Copy
2	relationship with applicant

Acknowledgement Receipt
1	Application Receipt No.
2	Service asked for
3	Date of Application
4	Date by which Service to be provided
5	fees/Facilitation Charges, if any
6	Signature of authorised official

== Citizen Service delivery Centres ==
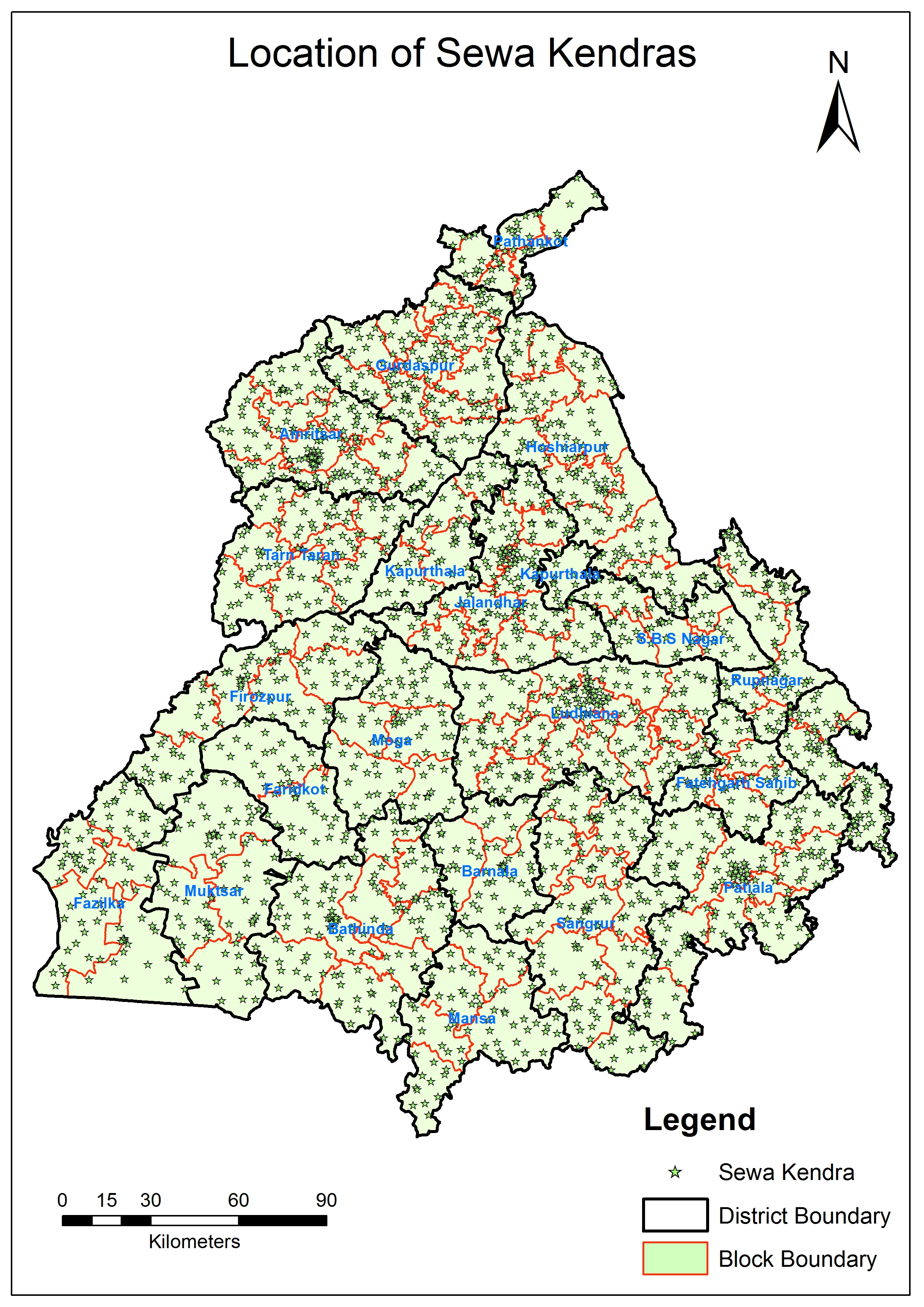
GIS location map of Sewa kendras cum citizen service delivery centres in Punjab, India

Punjab Government has developed a network of Service Centres (Punjabi ਸੇਵਾ ਕੇਂਦਰ). 2,147 service delivery centres are being developed to provide these services at the distance of 10 km in rural and 1.5 km in urban areas. Out of these 1,758 Centres and 389 are in urban areas.
