= Punjab Governance Reforms Commission =

- ਪੰਜਾਬ ਪ੍ਰਸ਼ਾਸ਼ਕੀ ਸੁਧਾਰ ਆਯੋਗ पंजाब प्रशाशन सुधार आयोग

Agency overview
- Formed: 8 January 2009
- Jurisdiction: Government of Punjab
- Headquarters: Chandigarh, India
- Minister responsible: Sukhbir Singh Badal
- Agency executives: Pramod Kumar, Chairman; Dipankar Gupta, member; Atul Sood, R. N. Gupta; J. R. Kundal, member; K. K. Talwar, member
- Parent agency: Government of Punjab, India
- Website: pbgrc.org

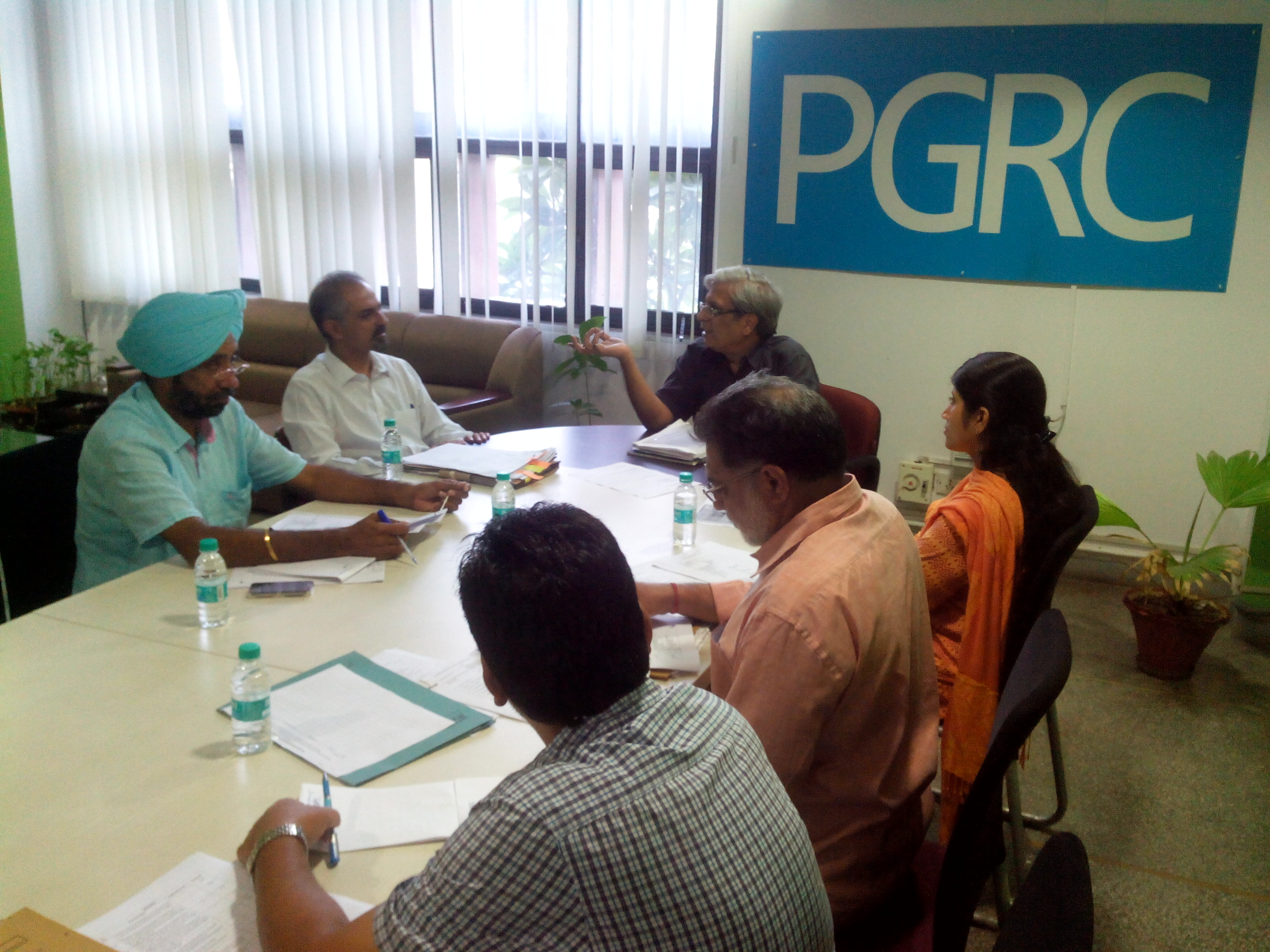
The Punjab Governance Reforms Commission in a meeting

The Punjab Governance Reforms Commission (PGRC) was established on 8 January 2009 and again reconstituted in 2012 by the Government of Punjab, India, under the chairmanship of Parmod Kumar, a social scientist and director of the Institute for Development and Communication in Chandigarh. The commission's main objective is to improve the welfare of the disadvantaged, marginalized and deprived sections of Punjab and to suggest changes in the processes, procedures, rules, regulations and design of the public services. Another objective of the commission is to make a paradigm shift away from the colonial era of governance, when "citizens were not trusted by the government, and services were provided as doles or khirat and citizens were treated like Riaia and administration as Mai Baap".

"The mandate of the Commission is to reduce the mistrust between the citizens and the government and protect dignity of citizens by identifying spaces, policies, processes and practices which perpetuate undignified exchange between the citizens and the state." The commission has submitted nine reports to the state government, and the government has simplified and notified 206 services. These services are to be provided under the Right to Service Act 2011 enacted on the basis of recommendations of the PGRC. Of these services, 32 services relate to the home department, 30 services to health, 28 to local government, 14 to power and electricity, 12 to revenue, 14 to agricultural and mandi board, 9 each to social security and transport, 8 to technical education, and 7 relate to the welfare of SCs and BCs. All these services are delivered through Suvidha Centres, Farad Kendras and Sanjh Kendras specifically created for this purpose at the district and subdistrict level.

At the recommendation of the PGRC, the state government is creating 2174 Unified Citizen Service Delivery Centres (UCSDCs) in the state to further improve accessibility of services to citizens both in rural and urban areas. The composition, reports and activities of the PGRC are available at its website. Abolition of non-statutory affidavits in the state is one of the most important recommendations of the commission, for which Punjab has been conferred the "best governance practice" award by the Government of India. Punjab is the first state in India to abolish non-statutory affidavits. Other important recommendations of the commission implemented by the state government in the field of governance relate to the enactment of the Punjab Right to Service Act 2011 and the formation of the Punjab Right to Service Commission to ensure the delivery of services to citizens in a timely manner. To implement the recommendations of the PGRC notified under the Punjab Right To Service Act 2011, the state government has created a specific Department of Governance Reforms.

== Reports ==
The commission has submitted eight reports to the state government containing detailed recommendations. Most of these recommendations have been accepted and implemented. The reports are available at the commission's website.

== Services under the Right to Service Act ==
The state government has notified 351 services under the Right to Service (RTS) Act Punjab, which have been posted on the Punjab RTS Commission website.
