= List of Indian Punjabi films of the 1980s =

List of Indian Punjabi films from 1981 to 1990

This is the list of Punjabi films released in the Indian Punjab in the 1980s.

== 1989 ==
- Marhi Da Deeva - Raj Babbar, Deepti Naval, Kanwaljeet, Pankaj Kapoor, Parikshit Sahni, Mohan Baggan, Gurcharan Baggan, Gopi Bhalla, Asha Sharma (Dir: Surinder Singh)
- Tunka Pyar Da - Daljeet Kaur, Surinder Walia, Tina Ghai, Surinder Shinda, Anil Pandit (Dir: Anil Pandit)
- Shareeka-Daljit Kaur, Shashi Puri - (Dir: Kanwar Jagdish)
- Jatt Te Zameen - Veerendra, Sukhjinder Shera, Guggu Gill, Yograj Singh, Suman Dutta, Manpreet Kaur, Sangita Mehta (Dir: Veerendra)

== 1988 ==
- Patola - Veerendra, Daljeet Kaur, Gurcharan Pohli, Mehar Mittal, Surinder Shinda, Muhammad Sadiq, (Director- Jagjeet Gill)
- Jatt Soormay - Veerendra, Gurcharan Pohli, Preeti Sapru, Mehar Mittal, Deep Dhillon, Gopi Bhalla (Dir: Veerendra, Avtar Walia)
- Suhag Chooda - Satish Kaul, Preeti Sapru, Nimmi Gill, Ram Mohan, Bharat Kapoor, Uma Khosla, Prem Deol, Sirpreet Brar, Rita Sikamd
- Dhee Rani - Satish Kaul, Rama Vij, Rakesh Bedi, Asha Sharma (Dir: Balbir Begumpari)
- Jag Wala Mela - Satish Kaul, Surinder Kaur, Ram Mohan, Bharat Kapoor, Mehar Mittal (Dir: Kamal Sahani)
- Maula Jatt - Dara Singh, Satish Kaul, Arpana Chaudhry, Raza Murad, Mehar Mittal, Rana Jung Bahadur, Ram Mohan, Ved Goswami, Tina Ghai & Bob Christo (Dir: Mohan Bhakri)
- Peengan Pyar Deeyan - Satish Kaul, Yogesh Chhabra, Shweta, Anu Dhawan, Mehar Mittal, Master Prezi, Lucky, Baby Seema (Dir: S. Jasbir)
- Ohla - Gurcharan Baggan, Aman Sara, Rama Vij
- Waaris - Bollywood Hindi Movie Based on Punjabi novel Kaare — Hatthi by Sohan Singh Hans Star Cast: Smita Patil, Amrita Singh, Raj Babbar, Raj Kiran, Amrish Puri, Kulbhushan Kharbanda, Javed Khan, Sushma Seth, Pradeep Kumar, Sudhir Pandey, Avtar Gill, Amrit Pal

== 1987 ==
- Yaar Gareeban Da - Daljeet Kaur, Satish Kaul, Yograj Singh, Geeta Behl, Jatinder Jeetu, Mehar Mittal (Dir: Uttam Tulsi)
- Chan Mera Mahi - Dheeraj Kumar, Meena Rai, Rakesh Pandey (Director: Subhash Bhakri, Producer: K. L. Gupta)
- Jako Rakhe Saiyan - Shashi Puri, Tina Ghai, Ved Goswami (Dir: Hardev Raj Rishi)
- Yaari Jatt Di
- Kee Banu Duniyan Daa - Daljeet Kaur, Gurdas Maan, Gurcharan Pohli, Manjit Mann, Surinder Shinda, Dara Singh, (Dir- Jagjeet Gill)
- Munda Naram Te Kudi Garam - Satish Kaul, Mehar Mittal, Sujata (Dir: Shanti Prakash Bakshi)
- Gabhroo Punjab Da - Gurdas Mann, Rama Vij, Guggu Gill, Mehar Mittal, Surinder Shinda, Amar Noorie, Manjeet Mann (Dir: Jagjeet)
- Jaag Punjabi Shera - Ramesh Sharma, Meena Rai, Mehar Mittal, Neetu Thakur, Bindu, Anil Gandotra (Director Anil Gandotra)
- Suneha - Shashi Puri, Music S. Madan
- Sat Bhakhey Ravidass - Vineet, Seema, Ashwini Bhardwaj, Indu Maan, Sushil Ghai (Director: Baba Kamal)
- Husn De Hulare - Raj Babbar (Special Appearance) Geeta Behl, Kuldeep Kalsi, Dinesh Varma

== 1986 ==
- Long Da Lishkara - Raj Babbar, Harpreet Deol (Actress) Om Puri, Gurdas Mann, Nina Tiwana (Dir/Prod - Harpal Tiwana), Om Puri, Gurdas Mann, Nina Tiwana (Dir/Prod - Harpal Tiwana)
- Ek Chadar Maili Si - Rishi Kapoor, Hema Malini, Poonam Dhillon, Kulbhushan Kharbanda, Dina Pathak, A. K. Hangal
- Jag Chanan Hoya - Satish Kaul, Daljit Kaur, Mehar Mittal, Yash Sharma (Dir: Mohan Bhakri)

== 1985 ==
- Sarpanch - Veerendra, Preeti Sapru, Anita Sarin, Yogesh Chhabra, Yash Sharma, Mehar Mittal, Shammi (Dir: Veerendra)
- Jeeja Sali - Satish Kaul, Mehar Mittal, Arpana Chaudhry, Bhavana Bhatt (Dir: Mohan Bhakri)
- Babul Da Vehra - Dara Singh, Satish Kaul, Arpana Chaudhry Mehar Mittal (Dir: Satish Bakhri)
- Vairi-Jatt - Veerendra, Daljeet Kaur, Benjamin Gilani, Ashok Nag, Shabnam Kapoor, Hina Kausar, Yash Sharma, Chand Usmani (Dir: V. K. Sobti)
- Maujaan Dubai Diyaan - Mithun Chakraborty, Bhavana Bhatt, Coca-Cola, Aruna Irani, Madhu Malini, Vinod Mehra, Mehar Mittal, Madan Puri (Dir: Subhash Bhakri)
- Guddo - Rama Vij, Muhammad Sadiq, Shashi Ranjan, Shobhini Singh, Sudha Chopra, Yash Sharma, Ranjeet Kaur, Mehar Mittal, Kanchan Mattu, Kulbir Badesaron & guest app-Veerendra, Satish Kaul (Dir: Naval Kishore)
- Kunwara Jeeja - Satish Kaul, Bhavana Bhatt, Mehar Mittal, Kanchan Mattu & Aruna Irani (Dir: Subhash Bhakri)
- Kaun Dilan Diyan Jane - Rajni Sharma, Kesai, Devender Maan, Brahmachari, Mehar Mittal (Dir - S. P. Puri)
- Ucha Dar Babe Nanak Da - Gurdas Maan, Preeti Sapru, Tanuja, Kulbhushan Kharbanda, Aruna Irani, Nirmal Rishi, Gurbachan Singh, Shammi, Girija Shankar, Yash Sharma, Sharat Saxena, Surinder Shinda

== 1984 ==
- Ranjhan Mera Yaar - Dharmendra, Veerendra, Meena Rai, Arpana Chaudhry, Mehar Mittal (Dir: Jagjit Singh Sidhu)
- Yaari Jatt Di - Veerendra, Preeti Sapru, Gurcharan Pohli, Mehar Mittal Sukhjinder Singh (Dir: Veerendra & Co. Dir: Ravinder Ravi)
- Duja Viah - Shashi Puri, Preeti Sapru, Damyinti Puri, Rajni Bala, Ved Goswami Mehar Mittal (Dir: Avtar Bhogal)
- Ishq Nimana-Satish Kaul, Bhavana Bhatt)
- Maanwaan Thandian Chhanwan - Satish Kaul, Surinder Kaur, Kulbhushan Kharbanda, Anita Sarin (Dir: Sukhdev Ahluwalia)
- Nimmo - Veerendra, Preeti Sapru, Shammi, Mehar Mittal, Yash Sharma, (Guest App Daljit Kaur, Kapil Dev, Yogesh Chabra, Tina Ghai) (Dir: Veerendra)
- Jigri Yaar - Veerendra, Gurdas Maan, Preeti Sapru, Mohan Singh Baggad, Sudha Chopra, Mandeep Deol, shammi, Mehar Mittal, Yash Sharma (Dir: K. Pappu)
- Lal Chooda - Bhavana Bhatt, Sandeep Kumar, Tej Sapru, Sudha Chopra, Mehar Mittal (Dir: Subhash Bhakri)
- Veera - Raza Murad, Satish Kaul, Rama Vij, Aparana Chaudhry, Sudha Chopra (Dir: Amrit Rana)
- Takraar - Raza Murad, Shashi Puri, Rama Vij, (Dir: Sukhdev Ahluwalia)

== 1983 ==
- Putt Jattan De - Baldev Khosa, Shatrughan Sinha, Daljeet Kaur, Dharmendra, Rehana Sultan, Guggu Gill, Mehar Mittal, Surinder Shinda, Muhammad Sadiq, Prakash Gill, Girija Mitra, Ved Goswami (Dir: Jagjeet Gill)
- Mamla Garbar Hai - Daljeet Kaur, Gurdas Maan, Mehar Mittal, Ram Mohan, Yash Sharma, Tina Ghai (Dir: Hari Dutt)
- Babul Da Vehda - Dara Singh, Satish Kaul, Arpana Choudhary, Mehar Mittal (Dir: Satish Bhakri)
- Batwara - Veerendra, Daljeet Kaur, Yograj Singh (Dir: Veerendra)
- Sassi Punnu - Satish Kaul, Bhawna Bhatt, Manmohan Krishna
- Sardara Kartara - Veerendra, Arpana Chaudhry, Yash Sharma, Sudha Chopra, Rajnibala, Mehar Mittal (Dir. Harbux Lata)
- Do Madari - Mehar Mittal, Arpana Chaudhry, Kanchan Mattu, Manorama (Dir: Mohan Bhakri)
- Laajo - Veerendra, Daljeet Kaur, Anita Sarin, Sudha Chopra, Yogesh Chhabra, Mehar Mittal, Yash Sharma (Dir: Veerendra)
- Patwari - Yogesh Chhabra, Arpana Chaudhary, Shavinder Mahal, Preeti Bala, Mehar Mittal (Dir: S. S. Arora)
- Bhulekha - Dara Singh, Satish Kaul, Bawna Bhatt, Maher Mittal (Dir: Chander) (Producer: Rajinder Jaura)
- Aasra Pyaar Da - Raj Babbar, Preeti Sapru, Kiron Kher, Navin Nischol (Dir: J. Om Prakash)
- Ambari - Dharmendra, Rama Vij, Ram Mohan (guest appearance) Bharat Kapoor, Madhu Malini, Ambari, Girja Mitra & Mehar Mittal (Dir: Bill Sikand)
- Bagga Daku - Bhavana Bhatt, Aruna Irani, Satish Kaul, Ram Mohan, Sarika (Dir: Satish Bakhri)
- Kashmira - (Dir: Sukhdev Ahluwalia) Veena Kapoor, Monto, Rabia Nazki, Usha Tikku (Also dubbed in: Kashmiri, Marathi, Gujarati, Tamil, Hindi) http://cfsindia.org/kashmira/
- Unkhilli Muttiar - Shashi Puri, Rama Vij, Mehar Mittal, Dara Singh, Yash Sharma, (Prod & Dir: Dara Singh)
- Haan Nu Haan Pyara - (Dir: Avtar Bhogal)
- Jai Mata Chintpurni - Biloo Bhakri, Yogesh Chhabra, Sudha Chopra, Arpana Choudhary, Ved Goswami, Satish Kaul Mehar Mittal (Dir: Satish Bhakri)
- Roop Shoukeenan Da - Daljeet Kaur, Satish Kaul, Yash Sharma, Gurcharan Pohli, Ved Goswaami, Rajni Bala, Suddha Chopra, Bhag Singh, Chamanlal Shugal, Sangeeta Mehta, Mehar Mittal, https://www.youtube.com/watch?v=e1dYt_DMkFg (Dir: Kanwal Viala)
- Vohti Hath Soti - Satish Kaul, Rama Vij, Sudha Chopra, Arpana Choudhary, Ved Goswami, Mehar Mittal Kanchan Mattu, Anil Pandit, Raza Murad, Meera (Dir: Mohan Bhakri)
- Sohni Mahiwal - Daljeet Kaur, Arun Chopra, Yash Sharma, Kanchan Mattu, Mehar Mittal, Produced & Directed: Kanwal Biala, Music: Surender Kohli, Lyrics: - Mohinder Dehlvi
- Aaj Di Heer - Satish Kaul, Tina Ghai, Yogesh Chabra, Leena Das, Om Shivpuri, Sudhir, Mehar Mittal & Veerendra (sp. app) (Dir: Ashwani Sharma)

== 1982 ==
- Angrejjan - Bhawna Bhatt, Satish Kaul, Raza Murad (Dir: Subhash Bhakri)
- Chhammak Chhallo - Bhavana Bhatt, Satish Kaul, RamMohan Sharma, Raza Murad (Dir: Subhash Bhakri)
- Jatt Da Gandasa - Satish Kaul, Daljeet Kaur, Shobhini Singh, Prem Singh Deol
- Reshma - Anil Dhawan, Raza Murad, Bindiya Goswami, Shailendra Singh, Mehar Mittal, Birbal
- Yaar Yaaran De - Raza Murad, Satish Kaul
- Mata Da Darbar - Manju Bhatia, Sudha Chopra, Guddu, Bharat Kapoor, Kanchan Mattu, Meharmittal, Raja Murad, Shashi Bala Saxena, Sunder (Dir: Kunwar Jagdish)
- Sarpanch-Veerendra, Priti Sapru, Mohan Singh Baggad, Shammi, Yash Sharma, Mehar Mittal, Ratan Aukal,
- Veer Tejaji - Rameshwari, Deepak Seth. Nilu, Directed by Nawal Mathur.
- Vehra Lambran Da - Satish Kaul, Padmini Kapila, Yogesh Chabra, Pawan Dev, Mehar Mittal, Birbal (Dir-Pawan Dev)
- Ranjha Ik Heeran Do - Dheeraj Kumar, Bhawna Bhatt, Raza Murad
- Rano - Satish Kaul, Veerendra, Bhavana Bhatt, Shobhini Singh, Kanchan Mattu, Mehar Mittal, Mohd. Sadiq (Sp Appearance), Ranjit Kaur (Dir: Satish Bhakri)

== 1981 ==
- Aj Da Majnu - Anu Dhawan, Satish Kaul, Mehar Mittal (Dir: Mehar Mittal) https://www.youtube.com/watch?v=uQHoiiXkHRk
- Chann Pardesi - Raj Babbar, Rama Vij, Kulbhushan Kharbanda, Amrish Puri, Om Puri, Rajni Sharma, Sushma Seth, Sunita Dhir, Mehar Mittal, Joga Cheema, Mohan Baggan, Baldev Gill, Mahender Mastana, Ravi Bhushan, Waryam Mast, Jagjeet Sareen (Dir: Chitraarth)
- Balbeero Bhabi - Veerendra, Gurcharan Pohli Shoma Anand, Mehar Mittal, Kuldeep Manak, Surinder Sharma (Dir: Veerendra)
- Do Posti - Anil Dhawan, I.S Johar, Rajendranath, Jaishree T., Komila Virk, Gopal Sehgal, Mehar Mittal, Kanchan Mattu, Mumtaz Shanti & Satish Kaul (guest app) (Dir: Chaman Nillay)
- Lachhi - Satish Kaul, Raza Murad, Bhavana Bhatt (Dir: Satish Bhakri)
- Josh Jawani Da - Satish Kaul, Yogesh Chabra, Babli (Dir: Surinder Kapoor)
- Mahi Munda - Baldev Khosa, Rita Bhaduri (Dir: Jarnail Singh)
- Sajjan Thug - Navin Nischol, Arpana Chowdhury, Diljeet Kaur, Mehar Mittal, OmShiv Puri & Premnath, Director Chaman Nillay, Producer Harbans Singh
- Chaska - (Dir: Mohan Kaul) Music: Hansraj Behl Lyrics: Munsif
- Jai Baba Balak Nath - Satish Kaul, Arpana Chaudhry, Sudha Chopra (Dir: Satish Bhakri)
- Sajre Phul - Master Anoop, Baby Varsha, Manorama, (Dir: Sukhdev Ahluwalia) Producer: Children's Film Society, India http://www.ultraindia.com/film-details/5194-sajjare-phool-khilte-suman
- Pardesan (a Canadian Punjabi film)

== 1980 ==
- Fauji Chacha - Sanjeev Kumar, Dheeraj Kumar, Madan Puri & Mehar Mittal (Dir: Dharam Kumar)
- Choran Nu Mor - Dheeraj Kumar, Padmini Kapila
- Sardara Kartara - Veerendra, Arpana Chaudhry, Yash Sharma, Sudha Chopra, Rajnibala, Mehar Mittal (Dir: Harbux Latta)
- Jatti - Mehar Mittal, Arpana Choudhry, Vijay Tandon (Dir: Mohan Bhakri) REMAKE OF Bhangrha - Nishi, Sunder, Khariti, Vimla, Satish, Ramlal & Majnu Dir: Jugal Kishore, Music: Hansraj Behl
- Ishq Nimana - Satish Kaul, Daljit Kaur, Tina Ghai, Ram Mohan, Yash Sharma, Sudha Chopra, Nina Cheema & Mehar Mittal (Dir: Vinod Talwar)
- Jai Mata Sheranwali - Yogesh Chabbra, Ruby Singh, Lata Arora, Surjeet Kaur, Jaya Kausalya, Mehar Mittal, Surendra Sharma, Manorama
- Gori Dian Jhanjran - Dheeraj Kumar, Satish Kaul, Bhawna Bhatt, Arpana Chaudhry, Seema Kapoor, Motia Kapoor, Manorama, Tuntun, Mehar Mittal(Biswajit-guest app) (Dir: Subhash Bhakri)

== See also ==
- List of Indian Punjabi films before 1970
- List of Indian Punjabi films between 1971 and 1980
- List of Indian Punjabi films of the 1990s
- List of Indian Punjabi films of the 2000s
