= List of Indian Punjabi films of the 1970s =

List of Punjabi films released in the Indian Punjab in the 1970s.

== 1979 ==
- Jatt Punjabi - Manoj Kumar, Raza Murad, Satish Kaul, Bhawna Bhatt, Arpana Chaudhry, Mehar Mittal, Rajendra Nath, Komila Virk, Madan Puri, Mumtaz Shanti, Yash Sharma, Ram Mohan (Dir: Satish Bakhri)
- Kuwara Mama - Veerendra, Mehar Mittal, Raj Banta, Bharat Bhushan, Padmini Kapila, Paikrishan, Rajni Bala, Shyamlee, Sunder (Dir: Sukhdev Ahluwalia)
- Sukhi Perwaar - Dheeraj Kumar, Mahendera Sandhu, Zaheera, Najneen, Manmohan Krishna (Dir: Dharam Kumar)
- Til Til Da lekha - Jayshree T., Sarita, Rakesh Khanna, Manoj Kumar, Kanchan Mattu, Manmohan Krishna (Dir: Sukhdev Ahluwalia)
- Guru Manio Granth - Rajesh Behl, Pinchoo Kapoor, Manmohan Krishna, Ram Mohan, D. K. Sapru, Sarita, Joginder Shelly (Dir: S.R. Kapoor)
- Dera Aashqan Da - Satish Kaul, Padmini Kapila, Sonia Sahni, Manmohan Krishna, Jaishree T., Meena T. (Dir: Pavan Dev)
- Gorakh Dhanda - Prem Bedi, Anu Dhawan, Diljit Kaur, Paintal (Dir: Ramesh Bedi)
- Saida Jogan - Daljeet Kaur, Veerendra, Satish Kaul, Mehar Mittal, Kanchan Mattu, Sudha Chopra, Muhammad Sadiq (Dir: B. S. Shaad)
- Sehti Murad - Dheeraj Kumar, Anil Dhawan, Ritu Kamal, Reeta Haksar, Yogesh Chhabra, Meher Mittal (Dir: Kailash Bhandari)
- Mutiyaar - Satish Kaul, Rita Bhaduri, Gursharan Singh (theatre director), Rajan Haksar, Sudha Chopra, Kanchan Mattu, Ved Goswami, Mehar Mittal (Dir: Surinder Singh)
- Mughlani Begum - Preet Kanwal, Vinod, Kulwant Chawla, Pinky, Pritam Dhindsa (Dir: Surjit Singh Sethi)

== 1978 ==
- Jindri Yaar Di - Veerendra, Sujit Kumar, Padma Khanna, Komila Virk, Mehar Mittal (Dir: Dharam Kumar)
- Vilayati Babu - Amitabh Bachchan, Reena Roy, Mehar Mittal, Reeta Haksar, Ruby Singh, Yogesh Chhabra (Dir: Dharam Kumar)
- Dhyanu Bhagat - Dara Singh, Yogeeta Bali, Satish Kaul, Komila Virk (Dir: Dara Singh)
- Giddha - Veerendra, Komilla Virk, Mala Jaggi, Dharmendra, Daljeet Kaur, Dara Singh, Rama Vij, Sujit Kumar, Mehar Mittal, Rajendra Nath, Jayshree T., Padma Khanna, Keshto Mukherjee, Navin Nischol, Manorama (Dir: B. S. Shaad)
- Jai Mata Sheranwali - Ruby Singh, Yogesh Chhabra, Lata Arora, Mehar Mittal, Sunder (Dir: Sukhdev Ahluwalia)
- Sher Puttar - Dheeraj Kumar, Padma Khanna, Manmohan Krishna, Dev Kumar, Mehar Mittal (Dir: Subhash Bhakri)
- Udeekan - Simi Grewal, Parikshit Sahni, Bharat Kapoor, Sanjeev Kumar, Bindu (Dir: Hari Dutt)
- Laadli - Kiran Kumar, Zaherra, Sudha Malhotra Dara Singh, Bindu (Dir: Uttam Tulsi)
- Darani Jathani - Dheeraj Kumar, Radha Saluja (Dir: Shanti S. Kalra)
- Tera Jawab Nahin -

== 1977 ==
- Saal Solvan Chadya - Zaheera, Devender Khandelwal, Girija Mitra, Makhan Singh, Chaman Puri, Kulwant, Abhimanyu Sharma, Jagat Singh, Sudha Chopra, Tina Katkar, Neelu, Bhupinder Kaur, Manju Bhatia & Rekha in guest appearance (Dir: Surinder Singh)
- Shaheed Kartar Singh Sarabha - (Dir: Pratab Sagar) Mehar Mittal, Rajani Sharma
- Sat Sri Akal - Sunil Dutt, Shatrughan Sinha, Reena Roy, Parikshit Sahni, Zaheera, Prem Nath (Dir: Chaman Nillay)
- Sassi Punnu - Satish Kaul, Bhavana Bhatt, Vijay Tandon (Dir: Satish Bhakhri)
- Jai Mata Di - Dara Singh, Narendra Chanchal, Babu Sonu, Sardar Akhter, Master Satyjeet, Master Vishaal, Sardar Akhtar, Mumtaz Begum, Madhumati, Kamini, TunTun, Sajid, Gulshan Bawaa, Mirza Mushauff, Polsan, Saudagar Singh, Jugnu, Special Appearance: Kamaljeet Sona (DIR: Daljit)
- Wangar - Baldev Khosla, Vijay Tandon, Meena Rai, Ruby Singh, Madan Puri, Manmohan Krishna, Chaman Puri, Kanchan Mattu, Mehar Mittal (Dir: Prof. Nirula)
- Sarfarosh [The Story of Shaheed Uddham Singh] - Sardul Kwatra, Lyricist: P. S. Narula
- Nachdi Jawani - Romesh Sharma, Meena Rai, Sujit Kumar (Dir: Som Haksar)
- Nakhro - Som Dutt, Meena Rai, Jaggat Singh (Dir: Satpal)

== 1976 ==
- Lambardarni - Dara Singh, Veerendra, Aruna Irani, Rajni Sharma, Shammi, Asha Parekh, Mehar Mittal, Kuldeep Manak, Surinder Sharma (Dir: Veerinder)
- Naukar Biwi Da - Rani, Harish, Brahamchari, Coca-Cola (Dir: H. S. Kanwal)
- Sardar-e-Azam - Vijay Tandon, Meena Rai, Raza Murad, Sapru
- Dharti Saddi Maa - Dheeraj Kumar (Dir: Surinder Singh)
- Main Papi Tum Bakhshanhaar - Dharmendra, Ashok Chopra, Shama, Yash Sharma, Yogesh Chabra, Ritu Kamal, Rajni Bala, Bharat Bhushan, Mehar Mittal (Dir: Subhash Bhakri)
- Santo Banto - Veerendra, Aruna Irani, Shatrughan Sinha, Dharmendra, Seema Kapoor, Mehar Mittal, Ajit Singh Deol, Manmohan Krishna (Dir: Ajit Singh Deol, brother of Dharmendra)
- Sawa Lakh Se Ek Ladaun - Dara Singh, Komila Wirk, Navin Nischol, Yogita Bali, Rajesh Khanna, Neetu Singh (Guest Appearance), Randhawa, Yash Sharma, Mumtaz Begum, Sunder, Mehar Mittal, Jankidas, Birbal (Dir: Dara Singh)
- Taakra - Varinder, Raza Murad, Sarita, Payal, Vijay Tandon, Mumtaz Shanti, Mehar Mittal (Dir: Sukhdev Ahluwalia)
- Yamla Jatt - I. S. Johar, Helen (Dir: Om Bedi)
- Daaj - Daljeet Kaur, Dheeraj Kumar, Mehar Mittal, Jeevan, Madan Puri, Darshan Bagga, Jagmohan kaur, Nasir Hussain, Mumtaz Begum (Dir: Dharam Kumar)
- Papi Tarey Anek - Dheeraj Kumar, Mina Rai, Jaishree T., Manmohan Krishna, Om Prakash (Dir: Dharam Kumar)
- Chadi Jawani Budhe Nu - B. S. Sood, Kimti Anand, Rajendranath, Vasundhara, Katy Mirza (produced by F. C. Mehra and directed by A. Salam)
- Change Mande Tere Bande - Birbal, Manmohan Krishna, Mehar Mittal, Raminder Soniya Sahni (Dir: Subhash Bhakri)

== 1975 ==
- Daku Shamsher Singh - Dev Kumar, Ranjeet, Sarita (Dir: Pushp Raaj)
- Dharam Jeet - Aruna Irani, Veerendra, Raza Murad, Tuntun, Mahendra Sandhu, Meher Mittal, Sunder, Brahmachari (Dir: Sukhdev Ahluwalia)
- Morni - Satish Kaul, Radha Saluja, Rajnibala, Jayashree T., Rajendranath, Jeevan, Madan Puri, Ram Mohan, Gopal Saigal. Tuntun, Mehar Mittal, Khraiti (Dir: Jugal Kishore)

== 1974 ==
- Teri Meri Ik Jindri - Veerendra, Meena Rai, Dharmendra, Vijay Tandon, Rajendra Kumar, Mehar Mittal, Mehmood Jr.
- Sacha Mera Roop Hai - Sarita, Harinder, Manmohan Krishna, Mehar Mittal, Helen, Jeevan, Vijay Tandon, Rajendra Nath, Ranjit, Tun Tun
- Satguru Teri Oat - Dara Singh, Som Dutt (Dir: Kaka Sharma) music by Jagjit Kaur
- Bhagat Dhanna Jatt - Dara Singh, Feroz Khan, Yogita Bali (Dir: Dara Singh)
- Dukh Bhanjan Tera Naam - Shaminder Singh, Radha Saluja, (Guest App by Rajendra Kumar and Dharmendra), Dara Singh, Sunil Dutt, Manmohan Krishna, Johnny Walker, Om Prakash, D. K. Sapru
- Do Sher - Dharmendra, Rajendra Kumar, Gauri Verma, Narendra, Hiralal, Uma Khosla, Dhanraj, Mehar Mittal, Gulab Singh, Surender Shrama, Kanchan, Sujit, Billa, Kidar Sehgal, Gurmeet, Rajan Haskar,(Dir: Sukhdev Ahluwalia)
- Mittar Pyare Nu - Mina Rai, Manmohan Krishna, Vijay Tandon (Dir: B. S. Shaad)
- Shaheed-e-Azam Sardar Bhagat Singh - Rajni Bala, Som Dutt, Achala Sachdev, Dara Singh (Dir: Om Bedi)

== 1973 ==
- Man Jeete Jag Jeet - Sunil Dutt, Radha Saluja, Gursharan Singh (theatre director), Harbhajan Jabbal, Sona, Ranjeet (Dir: B.S. Thapa)
- Tere Rang Nyare - Som Dutt, Meena Rai, Yash Stharma, Renu, Mehar Mittal, Paintal, Ram Mohan, Navin Nischol, Deven Verma, Satish Chabra (Dir: Pushp)
- Sherni - Subhash Ghai, Radha saluja, Aruna Irani, Ravindra Kapoor, Premnath, Tun tun, Mehar Mittal, Sunder, Gopal Saigal (music by Usha Khanna)
- Patola - V. Gopal, B. N. Bali, Indira Billi, Madan Puri, Sunder, Jani Babu Qawwal, Johnny Whisky, Music: B. N. Bali (Dir: Harish Rana)

== 1972 ==
- Jeeto - Savita, Pravesh Nanda, Uma Khosla, Machhar, Kharaiti (Dir: Ramesh Bedi)
- Mele Mitran De - Dara Singh, Prithviraj Kapoor, Meena Rai, Tun Tun, King Kong (Dir: Chaman Lal Shugal)

== 1971 ==
- Maa Da Laadla - Mehar Mittal, Vijay Tandon, Meena Rai, Khairati, Majnu

== 1970 ==
- Nanak Dukhiya Sub Sansar - Prithviraj Kapoor, Balraj Sahni, Dara Singh, Pran, Meena Rai, Achala Sachdev, Shaminder Ram Mohan, Mumtaz Begum (Dir: Dara Singh)
- Kankan De Ohle - Dharmendra, Asha Parekh, Jeevan, Ravindra Kapoor, Indira Billi, Uma Dutt, Mumtaz Begum, Anwar Hussain (Dir: Om Bedi)
- Dupatta - Joy Mukherjee, Indira Billi, Ravindra Kapoor, Sonia Sahni, Gopal Saigal, Manorama and Kamal Kapoor (Dir: Mohinder Wahi)
- Kulli Yaar Di - Indira Billi (Dir: Ved Mehra)

== See also ==
- List of Indian Punjabi films before 1970
- List of Indian Punjabi films of the 1980s
- List of Indian Punjabi films of the 1990s
- List of Indian Punjabi films of the 2000s
- List of Pakistani films
