= Kunwara Jeeja =

- Directed by: Subhash Bhakri
- Produced by: Rajiv Angrish
- Starring: Satish Kaul, Bhavana Bhatt, Raza Murad, Mehar Mittal, Aruna Irani.Kanchan Mattu
- Music by: Kamalkant
- Release date: 1985
- Country: India
- Language: Punjabi

Kunwara Jeeja is an Indian Punjabi movie released in 1985.

== Cast ==
- Satish Kaul
- Raza Murad
- Mehar Mittal
- Aruna Irani
- Bhavana Bhatt
- Kanchan Mattu

== Crew ==
- Music Director: Kamalkant
- Lyrics: Varma Malik
- Playback: Dilraj Kaur, Rajan Angrish, Chandrani Mukherji and Anuradha
- Producer: Rajiv Angrish
- Director: Subhash Bhakri
