= Hardev Dilgir =

Indian lyricist (1939–2022)

- Also known as: Dev Tharike Wala
- Born: Hardev Singh; 1939; Tharike (now in Ludhiana District), British Punjab, British Raj
- Died: 25 January 2022 (aged 82) Tharike, Punjab, India
- Genres: Folk, duet, kali
- Occupations: Writer, songwriter
- Years active: 1961–2022
- Label: His Master's Voice

Hardev Dilgir (1939 – 25 January 2022) best known as Dev Tharike Wala, was an Indian lyricist. He is known for his hit kali, Tere Tille Ton, sung by Kuldeep Manak.

== Early life ==
Dev was born as Hardev Singh, Ramgharia family in 1939, to father S. Ram Singh in the village of Tharike in British Punjab. He got his elementary education from the village school where he took admission in 1945. Then he went to high school in Lalton kalan village nearby and then to Ludhiana for higher education.

== Career ==
While studying in Lalton village high school, his Punjabi teacher, Hari Singh Dilbar, a well known Punjabi writer and novelist, encouraged him to write some poetry and Dev wrote a song for children, as he was a child himself at that time, named Chal Chakk Bhaine Basta School Challiye which was published in a magazine named Bal Darbar. This encouraged him a lot and he continued writing. Later he started writing stories under the name Hardev Dilgir and wrote about 35 books of stories and songs like Zaildarni Rohee Da Phull, Ikk See Kurhi etc. He got a job as a teacher in 1960 and his first song was recorded in 1961. His friends encouraged him to write songs and as he was inspired by Inderjit Hasanpuri's song Sadhoo Hunde Rabb Warge, Ghund Kaddh Ke Khair Na Paaiye, he has written some songs for singer 'Prem Kumar Sharma', who was selected by His Master's Voice. The singer recorded Dev's first songs including Bhabi Teri Dhaun De Utte Gutt Mehladi Naag Ban Kaala and few more. Dev was inspired to write Heer (lyrics) by a painting of Heer by the noted Sobha Singh. He continued songwriting under the name, Dev Tharike Wala. His lyrics/songs were sung by many singers like Karamjit Dhuri, Karnail Gill, Kuldeep Manak, Surinder Shinda, Swaran Lata, Gurcharan Pohli, Pammi Bai, Jagmohan Kaur, Narinder Biba and many modern Punjabi singers.

=== With Kuldeep Manak ===
He met singer Kuldeep Manak and penned many folklores for him. The first songs of Dev recorded by Manak included Jaimal Phatta and Kaulan (Raja Rasalu), both released on 7-inch EP, Punjab Dian Lok Gathawan, by His Master's Voice in 1973. Lyrics of Dev under the genre, Kali, became so popular that people started regarding the singer, Kuldeep Manak, as King of Kalian although Manak sang only 13–14 Kalian in his career. This was due to the record breaking popularity of one of his kalian, Tere Tille Ton that was released on Manak's first LP, Ik Tara, by His Master's Voice in 1976. Dev has penned almost every Punjabi Qissa (Folk story) even those that were not so commonly known in the society including Bego-Inder, Jani Chor, Roda-Jalali, Kehar Singh-Ram Kaur and more.

== Films ==
He also wrote lyrics for many Punjabi films including Sassi Punnu in which Kuldeep Manak sang his song, Ajj Dhee Ik Raje Di.

The film "Balbeero Bhabhi" featured his song "Sucheya Ve Bhabhi Teri" and "Datta Te Bhagat Soormen." The title track of the blockbuster hit Punjabi film "Putt Jattan De" (1981) was written by Dev Tharikewala and sung by Surinder Shinda.

== Personal life and death ==
Dilgir was married to Preetam Kaur, who died on 18 July 2018. He died in Tharike from a heart attack on 25 January 2022, at the age of 82.

== See also ==
- Kuldeep Manak
- Babu Singh Maan
- Gurmel Singh Dhillon
- Muhammad Sadiq
- Babu Rajab Ali
- Gurdas Maan
