= Punjab Dian Lok Gathawan =

EP by Kuldeep Manak
- Released: 1973
- Recorded: 1970s
- Genre: Kali, Folk
- Length: 11:05
- Label: His Master's Voice

Punjab Dian Lok Gathawan (Punjabi: ਪੰਜਾਬ ਦੀਆਂ ਲੋਕ-ਗਾਥਾਵਾਂ; also spelled as Punjab Diyan Lok Gathawan), the 7 inch, 45 rpm, was the first EP of Kuldeep Manak released by His Master's Voice (a subsidiary label of EMI) in 1973. The music was composed by Ram Saran Das and the lyrics were penned by Hardev Dilgir. The record contained one kali, Teri Khatar Heere, while the other three are the folk songs related to the old folktales of the Punjab. Recorded on the mono format, the record was a hit.

== Track listing ==
All lyrics are written by Hardev Dilgir; all music is composed by Ram Saran Das

No.	Title	Length
1.	"Jaimal Phatta"	2:52
2.	"Dulla Bhatti"	2:54
3.	"Heer Di Kali (Teri Khatar Heere)"	2:34
4.	"Raja Rasalu"	2:45
Total length:		11:05

== See also ==
- Ik Tara
- Tere Tille Ton

== Notes ==
- Then, The Gramophone Company of India Ltd. (or His Master's Voice), later, Saregama (RPG group)
