= Qurbani Jatt Di =

- Directed by: Priti Sapru
- Produced by: Hemavati Sapru
- Starring: Gurdas Maan; Dharmendra; Mehar Mittal
- Music by: Sukhwinder Singh
- Release date: 12 January 1990
- Country: India
- Language: Punjabi

Qurbani Jatt Di is a 1990 Indian Punjabi action film produced by Hemavati Sapru and directed by Priti Sapru.

== Plot ==
Sucha Sing attempts to stop Joginder, who is the father of his sister-in-law, Jeeto, from sexually molesting Kamli, a physical confrontation ensues, resulting in the death of Joginder. Sucha is arrested, tried in Court, and sentenced to life in prison. Jeeto's three brothers Jora, Nara and Dheera not satisfied with this, of deceased attempt to break-up Jeeto's marriage with Jagroop, and also prevent her look-alike sister, Preeto, from marrying Sucha's brother Karamjeet, setting off a feud that will result in more acrimony, and many more deaths. Dheera shot Jagroop with a gun and then Karamjeet beat him up and then Dheera got arrested and then went to the prison.

== Cast ==
- Dharmendra ... Sarpanch Sucha Singh (friendly appearance)
- Gurdas Maan ... Karamjeet (Karma)
- Raj Babbar ... Jagroop
- Yograj Singh ... Jora
- Gugu Gill ... Nara
- Priti Sapru ... Jeeto/Preeto (double role)
- Mehar Mittal ... Mama
- Deep Dhillon ... Dheera
- Nirmal Rishi ... Bhua
- Anjana Mumtaz ... Kamli (friendly appearance)
