= Hari Singh Dilbar =

Indian Punjabi language writer and poet

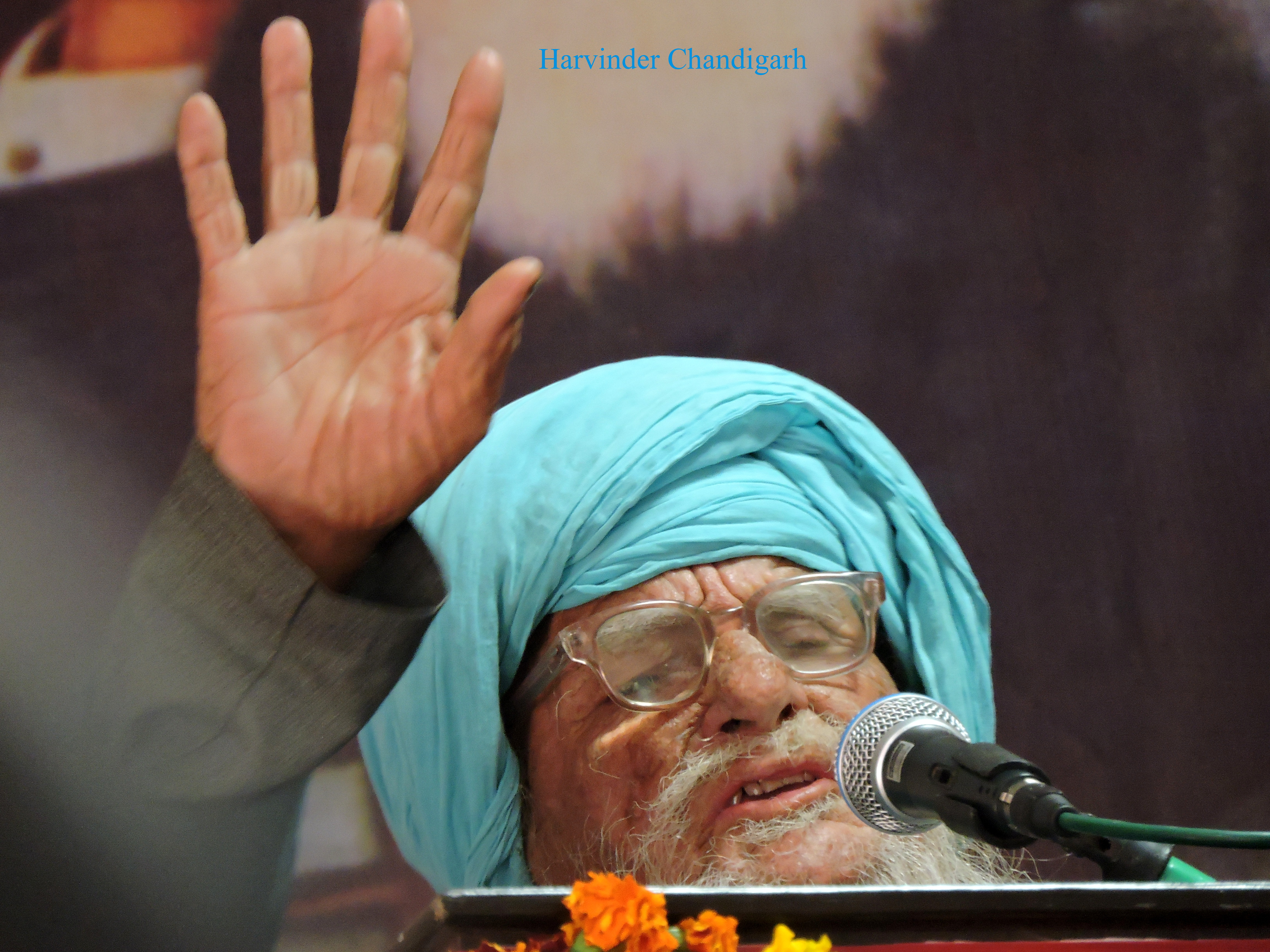
- Hari Singh Dilbar, at 19th Nabha Kavita Utsav (13-12-2015)
- Born: Hari Singh c. 1929; Layallpur, British Punjab (present-day Faisalabad, Pakistan)
- Died: 3 May 2017; Sirsa, Haryana
- Occupations: Writer, Poet
- Writing career
- Pen name: Hari Singh Dilbar
- Language: Punjabi
- Period: 1943–2017
- Genres: Poetry, Punjabi culture

Hari Singh Dilbar (c. 1929 – 3 May 2017) was a well-known South Asian Punjabi language writer and poet.

Born around 1929 in Layallpur, British Punjab (present-day Faisalabad, Pakistan) Dilbar has been writing and reciting poems since 1943.

== Early life ==
Dilbar was born as Hari Singh in 1929 in Layallpur (now Faisalabad), British Punjab. After partition they moved to Jalandhar and then shifted to Sirsa (now in Haryana state). He did his schooling up to fifth standard. Dilbar worked in a sweetshop for many year and lived by selling snacks and samosas near the bus stand of Sirsa.

== Career ==
He started writing poetry in 1943. A poet, he published many books on various subjects. With a long journey of reciting satirical poems at the Red Fort Delhi, he had recited his verses before Prime Minister Jawahar Lal Nehru to Narendra Modi, whom he had regaled with his lively satires. He travelled a number of foreign countries ad recent visit was to Australia.

== Death ==
On 3 May 2017, he died of serious attack of diabetics at his residence in Sirsa City. Writers and poets from the state expressed condolence of his demise.

== See also ==
- Surjit Paatar
- Dev Tharike Wala
- Gurbhajan Gill
