= Vilayati Babu =

- Directed by: Dharam Kumar
- Produced by: Mehar Mittal
- Starring: Mehar Mittal; Reena Roy; Nasir Hussain; Amitabh Bachchan; Ved Goswami; Yogesh Chhabda
- Release date: 18 September 1981
- Country: India
- Language: Punjabi

Vilayati Babu (Punjabi: ਵਿਲਾਇਤੀ ਬਾਬੂ), also spelled Walayati Babu, is a 1981 Punjabi film directed by Dharam Kumar, starring Mehar Mittal, Reena Roy, Nasir Hussain, Ved Goswami, and Yogesh Chhabda with a special appearance of Amitabh Bachchan.

== Cast ==
Actor/Actress	Role
Mehar Mittal	Vilayati Ram
Reena Roy	Billo
Nasir Hussain	Subedaar
Amitabh Bachchan	Jagga (Special appearance)
Ved Goswami	Sarpanch
Yogesh Chhabda	Ravi
