= Naya Daur (1978 film) =

- Movie Poster
- Directed by: Mahesh Bhatt
- Written by: Rakesh Kumar (Story); Arjun Dev Rashk (dialogue)
- Produced by: Sudesh Gupta
- Starring: Rishi Kapoor; Bhavana Bhatt; Danny Denzongpa; Farida Jalal
- Music by: R. D. Burman
- Release date: 6 January 1978
- Country: India
- Language: Hindi

Naya Daur is a 1978 Bollywood drama film directed by Mahesh Bhatt and produced by Sudesh Gupta. The film stars Rishi Kapoor, Bhavana Bhatt, Danny Denzongpa, Farida Jalal, Ranjeet, Madan Puri, Om Prakash in pivotal roles. Music was composed by R. D. Burman, lyrics by Anand Bakshi.

== Cast ==
- Rishi Kapoor as Mahesh Chopra
- Bhavana Bhatt as Kiran Mehta
- Danny Denzongpa as Mark
- Farida Jalal as Jenny
- Ranjeet as Ronnie
- Madan Puri as Mr. Mehta
- Om Prakash as Mr. Chopra
- Purnima as Shanti Chopra
- Shreeram Lagoo as Jenny's Father
- Paintal as Mangu
- Pinchoo Kapoor as Dharamdas
- D. K. Sapru as Hotel Manager
- Sharat Saxena as Ronnie's Goon
- Raj Tilak as Ronnie's Goon
- Leena Das as Cabaret Dancer

== Soundtrack ==
All songs were written by Anand Bakshi.

Song	Singer
"Paisewalon, Bade Insanon"	Kishore Kumar
"Chalo Kahin Aur Chalte Hain"	Kishore Kumar, Asha Bhosle
"Pani Ke Badle Mein Peekar Sharab"	Kishore Kumar, Danny Denzongpa
"Mujhe Doston Tum Gale Se Laga Lo, Mera Aur Koi Sahara Nahin"	Asha Bhosle, Mohammed Rafi, Danny Denzongpa
