= Khooni Murda =

- Directed by: Mohan Bhakri
- Written by: Mohan Bhakri, Anil Pandit
- Starring: Deepak Parashar; Shagufta Ali; Kiran Kumar
- Music by: Bappi Lahiri
- Release date: 23 February 1989
- Running time: 127 minutes
- Country: India
- Language: Hindi

Khooni Murda is a 1989 Bollywood horror film directed and produced by Mohan Bhakri and starring Deepak Parashar, Javed Khan and Sriprada. The movie is a low budget Indian version of A Nightmare on Elm Street (1984). Movie was graded adult (A) certificate because of nude scenes of lead actress Shagufta Ali. There was no body double used and Shagufta Ali has to shoot fully nude for one scene from behind. It was labelled B Grade horror movie. The movie was an average grosser of the year 1989. The music of the film is composed by Bappi Lahiri.

== Plot ==
This is the revenge story of Ranjit and his girl friend Rekha who were killed by a group of college students. the dead man's soul revives as a vengeful spirit and begins to kill the college students one by one.

== Cast ==
- Deepak Parashar as Police Inspector Rakesh
- Javed Khan as Dev
- Shriprada as Prabha
- Puneet Issar as Johnny
- Rajesh Vivek as Tantric
- Kiran Kumar as Ranjeet
- Shagufta Ali as Rekha
- Meethee as Anuradha
- Kamna as Kamna
- Amrit Raj as Sandhu
- Madhu Malhotra as Professor Malhotra
- Jagdeep as Khairati Lal Patthar Dil

== Music ==
1. "Chaska Chaska" - Kavita Krishnamurthy
2. "Main Kurate Ka Butto Banke" - Jagdeep, Shagufta Ali
