= Priti Sapru =

Indian actress

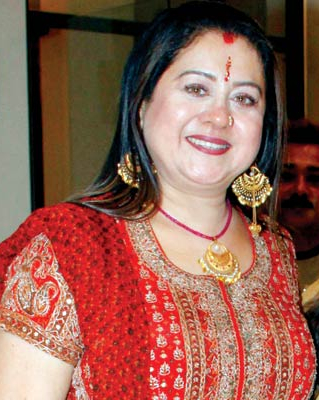
- Priti Sapru
- Other names: Preeti Sapru; Priti Sapru Ahluwalia
- Occupations: Actress, filmmaker
- Spouse: Upvan Ahluwalia
- Children: 2
- Father: D. K. Sapru
- Relatives: Reema Rakesh Nath (sister); Tej Sapru (brother)

Priti Sapru (also spelled Preeti Sapru) is an Indian actress known for her works in Punjabi and Hindi cinema. She appeared in a number of films, including Nimmo, and Qurbani Jatt Di, among others, with actors Veerendra, Gurdas Maan and Raj Babbar.

== Early life ==
She was born to veteran actor D. K. Sapru. Actor Tej Sapru is her brother, and screenwriter Reema Rakesh Nath is her sister.

== Career ==
She started her career with the film Habari in 1979, then appeared in small parts in Laawaris (1981) and Avtaar (1983). Priti was the pioneer of album activity through Bhangra Gidda in 1990. She wrote Zameen Asmaan, which starred actors Shashi Kapoor, Sanjay Dutt, Rekha, and Anita Raaj. She wrote, directed and produced the Punjabi movie Qurbani Jatt Di. She launched the first Punjabi channel (Alpha), which was a part of Zee at the time.

Sapru was active in initiating the relief rally for earthquake victims in Jammu and Kashmir. She has forwarded donations for NGOs such as Balbhavan, Catherine Home, and Premnidhi.

Sapru has followed Narendra Modi since he was a BJP candidate in Gujarat and has been active in campaigning for rallies with Arun Jaitley and Vijay Sampla in Punjab. Sapru accompanies Jaitley in social activities but is also considered to be a close aide to Sangeeta Arun Jaitley. Rajnath Singh invited Sapru to join the BJP, and she formally joined the party during the Fateh Rally in Punjab on 23 February 2014. Sapru has plans to initiate an anti-drug campaign in Punjab.

In 2018, she lobbied for minority status to be granted to Sikhs in Jammu and Kashmir.

== Awards ==
Sapru has received the Punjab State Award for Best Actress in 1995, the "Mahila Shiromani 1998" for contributions to Punjabi Cinema, the "First Lady Director in Punjabi Film History" from First Lady Vimala Sharma and "Punjabi Ratna" from the Press club, along with Dr. Manmohan Singh (ex-Prime Minister), Chief Minister Prakash Singh Badal, and sports persona Milkha Singh in 2002. "Punjab Shiromani" was presented by Amarinder Singh from Patiala University for the first time to a non-Punjabi. The "Hamdard Award" from Ajit Daily was given to her by Prakash Singh Badal, among other awards. She received the Punjabi Legend Award for contributions to the Punjabi film industry from Pranab Mukherjee in Chennai to celebrate 100 years of Indian Cinema in November 2013.

== Personal life ==
She is married to architect Upvan Sudarshan Ahluwalia. They have twin daughters, Riya Walia and Rene Walia.

== Filmography ==
Year	Film	Role	Note
1981	Lawaaris	Chano	
1982	Ucha Dar Babe Nanak Da	Channi	
1982	Sarpanch		
1983	Avtaar	Sudha	
1983	Aasra Pyar Da	Kiran	
1984	Nimmo	Nimmo	
1984	Jagir		
1984	Jigri Yaar		
1984	Yaari Jatt Di	Billo	
1986	Tahkhana	Panna	
1983	Arpan	Vinnie Verma	
1986	Kismatwala	Chamki	
1987	Nazrana	Sheetal Puri	
1987	Goraa	Radha takur	
1990	Qurbani Jatt Di	Jeeto/Preeto	
1990	Diva Bale Sari Raat	Aisha	
1990	Aaj Ka Arjun	Mohan's wife	
1990	Dushmani Dee Agg	Preeto	
1991	Jigarwala	Tara	
1992	Heer Ranjha		
1992	Mehndi Shagna Di		
1994	Ucha pind		
1994	Nasibo	Veero	
1995	Sir Thad Di Baazi	Preeti	
1995	Pratigya	Preeto	
1996	Kalinga		
1997	Truck Driver	Jeeto	
2019	Kaake da Viyah		
