= Kunickaa Sadanand =

Indian actress and singer

Kunika Sursuri Sadanand
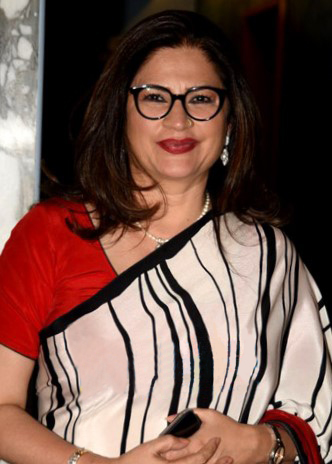
- Kunickaa at the screening of Sonata, 2017
- Born: Kunickaa Sursuri Sadanand; 27 February 1964 (age 62); Mumbai, Maharashtra, India
- Occupations: Actress, singer, lawyer
- Years active: 1988–present
- Spouse(s): Abhay Kothari (Divorced); Vinay Lall (Divorced)<
- Children: 2
- Relatives: Kabir Sadanand (brother); Deepak Tijori (brother-in-law)

Kunickaa Sursuri Sadanand (born 27 February 1964) is an Indian film actress and TV actress, advocate, producer and social activist. She is known for her various characters in many Indian films as both a villain and in comedic roles. In 2025, she participated in Bigg Boss 19.

Also a singer, she has released three pop albums titled Lakhon Mein Ek released in 1996, and Kunickaa which was released in 2002. She released her third album named Joombish (A Mystical Journey) on 2 May 2006.

== Personal life ==
Kunickaa hails from an Indian Air Force family. Her father served in the IAF. She has two brothers, Kabir Sadanand, who is an actor and a producer while her other brother is an officer in the IAF like their father. Kunickaa Sadanand has been married twice; her first marriage was with Abhay Kothari from Delhi. She has a son from this marriage. Her second marriage was with Vinay Lall (Mr. Lall) whom she married at the age of 35; together they have a son. She was romantically involved with Sunil Sikand (actor Pran's son) during the 80s and later with singer Kumar Sanu in late 90s. She, along with her business partner, created restaurants called "White - the Italian café", "Zingcafe", "Majestica – The Royal Banquet Hall", and a spa called "Exhale" in Goregaon in suburban Mumbai. The partnership however ended in 2007.

Kunickaa has conducted, organized and participated in over 100 stage shows in India and around the world. She also runs an event company called Karma Events and Entertainment.

Kunickaa has been actively involved in social activities like AIDS awareness campaigns for the last 20 years.

She launched Tara Charitable Trust on 15 August 2005. This trust aims at rebuilding lives of destitute people, helping the underprivileged and providing medical, educational and emotional succor to the needy. She is a trustee to the NGO CHIP (Children In Progress), Mumbai, which is actively working for child health and education.

== TV and film career ==
Since her teenage years, Kunickaa Sursuri sadanand was keen to join the Indian TV industry as an actress. After doing a few TV serials in Delhi, she went to Mumbai to act in films. Manju Asrani, wife of well known comic actor Asrani gave Kunickaa the first break as an actress in a TV serial. Her second break was a role in the TV serial Adalat, directed by Dheeraj Kumar. Kunickaa began her film career at the age of 28 in a 1988 horror Hindi movie named Kabrastan. She has acted in many negative roles in movies like Beta, Gumraah and Khiladi. Kunickaa has acted in 110 films in 25 years.

Swabhimaan a TV serial, where she played mother to an 18-year-old breakthrough role that won her many plaudits. She acted in a TV serial called Kana Phoosi on Doordarshan and in Pyaar Ka Dard Hai Meetha Meetha Pyaara Pyaara on Star Plus. She was also seen in the reality TV show Box Cricket League on Sony Entertainment as a fielder from the team Pune Anmol Ratn, while most recently she played the character of Rani Durgavati in the TV serial Akbar Birbal on Big Magic. She is currently seen in &TV show Dilli Wali Thakur Gurls as a loud goan Christian Juliet Bai.

She is currently participating as a contestant in Bigg Boss 19.

== Social media incident ==
In February 2026, actress Kunickaa Sursuri Sadanand criticized a social media troll who compared her son to singer Kumar Sanu using an AI-generated image. She condemned the comparison as inappropriate, calling it “out of hand” and defending her family’s privacy.

== Filmography ==
=== Films ===
Year	Film	Role	Notes
2018	Jawani Phir Nahi Ani 2	Celina's mother	Pakistani Film
2016	Bhouri	Kaki	
2014	Fugly	Devi's mother	
2011	Yeh Dooriyan	Mrs. Arora	
2011	Monica	Judge	
2011	Jihne Mera Dil Luteya	Mrs. Bajwa	Punjabi Film
2006	Shaadi Karke Phas Gaya Yaar	Rammi	
2006	Men Not Allowed		
2006	Tom, Dick, and Harry	Jassi Singh	
2005	Padmashree Laloo Prasad Yadav	Pradyuma's mother-in-law	
2005	Page 3	Monaz Modi	
2004	Meri Biwi Ka Jawab Nahin	Prakash's wife	
2004	Insaaf: The Justice	Minister Rameshwari Verma	
2004	Suno Sasurjee	Mrs. Kiran Kumar	
2003	Jodi Kya Banayi Wah Wah Ramji	Bengali lady	
2003	Khanjar: The Knife	Pammi's girlfriend	
2003	Andaaz	Party guest	
2003	Talaash: The Hunt Begins...	Prema Malini	
2003	Kyon?	Mrs. Desai	
2002	Tum Jiyo Hazaron Saal	Mrs. Kapur	
2001	Ek Rishtaa: The Bond of Love	Sweety Aunty	
2001	Dil Ne Phir Yaad Kiya (2001 film)	Smt. Chopra	
2000	Raja Ko Rani Se Pyar Ho Gaya	Manjula	
2000	Woh Bewafa Thi		
2000	Shikaar	Nurse	
1999	Hum Saath-Saath Hain: We Stand United	Shanti	
1999	Daag: The Fire	Nurse Lily	
1998	Wajood	Mrs. Chawla	
1998	Maharaja	Mrs. Singh	
1998	Qila	Neelam Daniel	
1998	Jaane Jigar		
1998	Pyaar Kiya to darna kya	Mrs. Khanna	
1997	Dil Kitna Nadan Hai		
1997	Koyla	Rasili	
1997	Judge Mujrim	Dancer (in song "Khatra Shabnam Ka")	
1997	Tamanna	Actress	
1997	Dhaal	Mrs. Deodhar	
1996	Shastra (1996 film)	Sonia	
1996	Fareb	Brinda	
1996	Loafer		
1996	Raja Ki Aayegi Baraat	Sharda Devi	
1996	Apne Dam Par	Mamiji	
1995	Takkar	Sheena Vasudev	
1995	The Don	College professor	
1995	Baazi	Rani	
1995	Jawab		
1995	Kismat		
1994	Hum Hain Bemisaal		
1994	Mohra	Flora	
1994	Chhoti Bahoo	Shobha	
1994	Aa Gale Lag Jaa	Mrs. Jagatpal Sharma	
1994	Andaz (1994 film)	Shobha (uncredited)	
1993	15th August (1993 film)	Phulwa	
1993	Kasam Teri Kasam		
1993	Tadipaar	Mohinidevi's secretary	
1993	Gardish	Shiva's Elder Sister	
1993	Chandra Mukhi	Lily	
1993	Khoon Ka Sindoor		
1993	Gumrah	Female cop in Hong Kong	
1993	Kohra	Kitty	
1993	Meri Aan	Nagina Bai	
1993	Ghar Aaya Mera Pardesi		
1993	The Monster	Konica	
1993	King Uncle	Kamla (Guest appearance)	
1992	Dil Hi To Hai (1992 film)	Flower seller	
1992	Heer Ranjha	Bigo	
1992	Aaj Ka Goonda Raj	Chanda	
1992	Khiladi	Julie	
1992	Zakhmi Sipahi	Cameo, in song "O Chaila"	
1992	Meera Ka Mohan		
1992	Siyasat		
1992	Bewaffa Se Waffa	Nagma's aunt	
1992	Beta	Kunika	
1991	Kaun Kare Kurbanie		
1991	Kurbaan	Gayatri	
1991	Do Matwale		
1991	Ayee Milan Ki Raat		
1991	Dushman Devta	Kamli	
1991	Parakrami		Unreleased movie
1991	Vishnu-Devaa		
1991	Jeena Teri Gali Mein		
1991	Jungle Beauty		
1991	Haque	Asha	
1990	Majboor	Sushila	
1990	Baaghi: A Rebel for Love	Dhanraj's girlfriend	
1990	Thanedaar	Munni	
1990	Agneekaal	Madhu Saxena	
1990	Doodh Ka Karz	Munnijaan	
1990	Bandh Darwaza	Kamya Singh	
1990	Amavas Ki Raat		
1989	Paanch Paapi		
1989	Sachai Ki Taqat	Laxmi	
1989	Kahan Hai Kanoon	Rita	
1989	Jaisi Karni Waisi Bharni	Pyarelal's wife	
1989	Mujrim	Maria (uncredited)	
1988	Kabrastan	Kitty	

=== Television shows ===
Year	Show	Role
2025	Bigg Boss 19	Contestant
2015–2016	Akbar Birbal	Rani Durgavati
2015	Dilli Wali Thakur Gurls	Mrs. Juliet
2015	Sasural Simar Ka	Thakurayan / Thakurain
2014–2015	Box Cricket League	Contestant
2014	Pyaar Ka Dard Hai Meetha Meetha Pyaara Pyaara	Anisha James Waterson
2012	Kanaphusi	Mother in law
2010–2011	Sanjog Se Bani Sangini	Naani
2007	Kahani Ghar Ghar ki	Garima Garg
2003	Strivers & Achievers	Anchor
2003	Ssshhhh...Koi Hai	Mrs. Malini (Models Judge)
2001	CID	Rakhi
2001	Aashirwad	
2001	Dollar Bahu	Charu's friend
2002	Kittie Party	Vasundhara
1998-2000	Sparsh	
1995	Swabhimaan	Nishi Malhotra
1990	The Sword of Tipu Sultan	Yasmin Khan

=== Web series ===
Title	Role	Platform	Year
Taish	Beeji	ZEE5	2020
