= Harpal Tiwana =

Indian playwright and film and theatre director

Harpal Singh Tiwana (8 August 1935 – 28 october 2003) was an Indian playwright and film and theatre director known for his Punjabi-language plays and films.

His two ventures into film making Long Da Lishkara and Diva Bale Sari Raat became landmarks in Punjabi cinema. He also directed two television productions – Sanjhi Deewar and project on Maharaja Ranjit Singh for Doordarshan

His famous plays include Long Da Lishkara, Diva Bale Saari Raat, Mela Munde Kudyian Da, Hind Di Aawaz and Sirhind Di Deewar both historical . He established Punjab Kala Manch at Patiala along with his wife to promote local artists in 1967. Both Tiwana and his wife Neena Tiwana were the first Panjabi’s to graduate from the National School of Drama. Neena Tiwana and his son Manpal Tiwana are also playing a key role in promoting the theatre in Punjab.

Harpal died in a road accident near Palampur in Himachal Pradesh, on 19 May 2002, while filming Series on Maharaja Ranjit Singh, was cremated at Badungar cremation ground at Patiala. The Harpal Tiwana Foundation was set up in his memory after his death.

== Filmography ==
- Mirza Sahiban (1957) Hindi Movie act (Bhangra dance) in the song long with Sardul Singh Kwatra “Nahin Rees Punjab Di” and “A Kudya A Mundya”
- Long Da Lishkara (1983)
- Diva Bale Sari Raat (1990)
- Sanjhi Deewar (television)
