= Amavas Ki Raat =

1990 Hindi horror film by Mohan Bhakri

Amavas Ki Raat (English: New moon night) is a 1990 Hindi horror film directed by Mohan Bhakri. It stars Kiran Kumar, Rakesh Bedi, Kunika and Jagdeep. The plot focuses on occult practices and sorcery.

== Plot ==
A pregnant lady discarded by society calls to her sister Nanda for help. Nanda is married to a powerful tantric magician. She could not save her sister but used her own tantra to give birth to her dead sister's child. However, her husband warns her that this child born at Amavas Ki Raat (new moon) may be a demon.

== Cast ==
- Kiran Kumar as DIG Vinod Saxena
- Rakesh Bedi as Inspector Premlal Sharma
- Kunickaa Sadanand as Seema Saxena
- Usha Khanna as Asha Saxena
- Javed Khan as Sunil
- Manik Irani as The Demon
- Jagdeep as Plumber Dada
- Madhu Malhotra as Gowri
- Mayur as Yogesh Chhabra
- Sunil Dhawan as Anjali's father
- Huma Khan as Pinky
- Rahul singh as Munna
- Kamna as Anjali
