= Ranjhan Mera Yaar =

- Directed by: Jagjit Singh Sidhu
- Written by: Telu Ram Kohara
- Produced by: Sardul Singh Grewal
- Starring: Dharmendra; Ajit Sigh Deol, Veerendra; Ram Mohan, Meena Roy, Arpana Chowdhury, Mehar Mittal, Kanchan Mattu; Manmohan Krishan
- Cinematography: S.S Chadha
- Edited by: Deepak Pal
- Music by: Surinder Kohli
- Release date: 1984
- Country: India
- Language: Punjabi

Ranjhan Mera Yaar is a 1984 Bollywood film starring Dharmendra. Ranjhan Mera Yaar also stars Veerendra and Meena Roy. This movie was created by Telu Ram Kohara who is also an amazing writer of books. This movie was shot in Ludhiana, Punjab. Film also starred Varinder Punjabi film star at that time also comedian mehar mittal was there in the movie as well. Telu Ram Kohara has given a lot of Punjabi books to Punjabi literature including Rang badaldey Mausam and his recent autobiography Zindagi da Mela are quite popular in Punjabi book readers. Telu Ram Kohara served as a teacher in Government school and also remained The Daily Ajit' most read Punjabi newspaper's journalist for more than 30 years. He was famous for his honest and sincere press reporting.

== Music ==
Song writin by By Ajaib Singh Grewal

Lar Gai Lar Gai-Mahendra Kapoor & Dilraaj Kaur

Hun Kalyian Rehan Noon- Mahendra Kapoor, Dilraaj Kaur, Surinder Kohli & Krishna Kalle

Gidha Gidha Kar Naan Melney- Minoo Purshottam, Rajinder Kaur & Savita SatheeTera

Tak Lendi Ud Ke Garan- Asha Bhosle Uhnan Rahan Vich- Mahendra Kapoor, Kithe Challi Yen, Surinder Kohli, Minoo Purshottam

Asan Te Apne Deshdee-Mahendra Kapoor & Dilraaj Kaur

Menda Deen Vee Toon
