= Teri Meri Ik Jindri =

- Directed by: Dharma Kumar
- Written by: Inderjit Hasanpuri
- Produced by: Inderjit Hasanpuri
- Starring: Dharmendra, Meena Roy
- Music by: S. Mohinder
- Production company: Ludhiana Film's
- Release date: 1975
- Country: India
- Language: Punjabi

Teri Meri Ik Jindri is a 1975 Punjabi film starring Dharmendra, Veerendra, and Meena Roy. The movie had very popular song like "Terian Mohabtan Nemaa Sutea" sang by Narinder Biba, an Sital Singh Sital.

== Cast ==
- Dharmendra as Superman's Dad ( Special Appearance)
- Veerendra as Jeetiaa
- Meena Roy
- Jeevan as Jagga Daku
- Johnny Walker as Sadhu (Zaildara)
- Mehar Mittal as Hansu (Hai-ka-na)
- Rajendra Kumar as Jaggar Singh Fauji (Special appearance)
- Mehmood Junior as Latoo

== Music ==
Teri Meri Ek Jindri (Original Motion Picture Soundtrack)

Soundtrack album by S. Mohinder
- Released: 5 February 1975
- Genre: Feature film soundtrack
- Length: 36:30
- Language: Hindi
- Label: His Master's Voice

The music for Teri Meri Ek Jindri was composed by S. Mohinder an all songs lyrics by Inderjit Hasanpuri . The soundtrack album was released by His Master's Voice on February 5, 1975. The album consists of 9 songs.

No.	Title	Singer(s)	Length
1.	"Ene Zor Di Marori Meri Baan"	Mohammed Rafi, Narinder Biba	04:21
2.	"Teri Meri Ek Jindri"	Narinder Biba, Sital Singh Sital	02:48
3.	"Aag Lage Mehlan Noo"	Asha Bhosle	03:40
4.	"Ooe Ni Main Margai"	Asha Bhosle, Narinder Biba	03:30
5.	"Bhar Bhar Vand Muthian"	Shamshad Begum, Mahendra Kapoor	06:06
6.	"Veah Karva De Mera"	Daleep Singh Deep	04:12
7.	"Do Bachche Ghar Ka Shingar"	Mohini Narula	05:18
8.	"Terian Mohabtan Nemaa Sutea"	Narinder Biba	02:57
9.	"Pyar Kinj Pai Da"	Krishna Kalle, Narinder Biba	03:26
Total length:			36:30
