= Sassi Punnu (1983 film) =

- Directed by: Satish Bhakhri
- Based on: Sassi Punnu
- Produced by: Mahinder Kaailay
- Starring: Satish Kaul and Bhavana Bhatt
- Music by: Ravi
- Release date: 1983
- Country: India
- Language: Punjabi

Sassi Punnu is a 1983 Indian Punjabi-language film, directed by Satish Bhakhri, starring Satish Kaul and Bhavana Bhatt. It is based on the folktale of Sassi Punnu.

== Music ==
The music is composed by Ravi for the playback singers Mohammad Rafi, Asha Bhosle, Usha Mangeshkar, Mahendra Kapoor, Muhammad Sadiq, Kuldeep Manak, and Anette. Hardev Dilgir, Babu Singh Maan, Munsif, Qamar Jalalabadi and Mahinder Kaailay penned the lyrics. The music vinyl record was released by His Master's Voice in 1982.

=== Track list ===
All music is composed by Ravi.

The film has total 9 songs:
No.	Title	Lyrics	Singers	Length
1.	"Ajj Dhee Ik Raje Dee"	Hardev Dilgir	Kuldeep Manak
2.	"Sassiye Hae Ni Sassiye"		Muhammad Sadiq
3.	"Hae Saiyyo Ni Raatin Supna Kee Vekhia"	Munsif	Asha Bhosle
4.	"Jad Mukhda Vekhia Yaar Da"	Munsif	Mohammad Rafi & Asha Bhosle
5.	"Dass Meria Dilbara Ve"	Munsif	Mohd. Rafi & Asha Bhosle
6.	"Laggi Wale Te Kadi Naee Saunde"	Muhammad RAFEEQ Akhtar	Mohd. Rafi
7.	"Mera Kalla Kalla Pyar"	Qamar Jalalabadi	Mahendra Kapoor & Usha Mangeshkar
8.	"Yaar Vai Vai"	Mohinder Kaailay	Anette
9.	"Dachi Walia Morh Muhar Ve"	Babu Singh Maan	Asha Bhosle
