= Tharike =

Tharike Threeke, Thrike
- Suburb of Ludhiana
- Location in Punjab, India Tharike (India)
- Coordinates: 30°52′33″N 75°46′32″E
- Country: India
- State: Punjab
- District: Ludhiana
- Talukas: Ludhiana

Population (2001)
  - Total: 8,884

Languages
  - Official: Punjabi (Gurmukhi)
  - Regional: Punjabi
- Time zone: UTC+5:30 (IST)
- PIN: 142021
- Telephone code: 0161-
- Nearest city: Ludhiana
- Sex ratio: 1000/861 ♂/♀

Tharike is a suburb of Ludhiana city in the Indian state of Punjab. It was earlier a village but now the area has come under the city.

== Demographics ==
As of 2001 census, the village has the total population of 8,884 with 4,773 males and 4,111 females; thus, males constitutes 54% and females 46% of population with the sex ratio of 861 females per thousand males.

== Notable people ==
- Hardev Dilgir, lyricist
