= Kali (chhand) =

ਕਲੀ Kali
- Cultural origins: Punjab
- Popularity: 1970s when sung by Kuldeep Manak

Subgenres
- Suchchi Kali (Punjabi: ਸੁੱਚੀ ਕਲੀ); Amba Kali (Punjabi: ਅੰਬਾ ਕਲੀ); Roopa Kali (Punjabi: ਰੂਪਾ ਕਲੀ)

Kali (/kəliː/; Punjabi: ਕਲੀ), is a form of Chhand (quatrain), a poetry bond under strict rules in Punjabi literature. Kali chhand is also used in singing as a type of Punjabi folk song where it is also known by its plural form, Kalian or Kaliyan. Although it is not so common in singing, it became a particular genre of Punjabi music. Kali is sung by only few Punjabi singers like Kuldeep Manak, Surinder Shinda and some more, but it was popularized by Kuldeep Manak with Tere Tille Ton written by Dev Tharike Wala (also known as Hardev Dilgir).

== Types and subgenres ==
There are three types of the kali chhand: Suchchi Kali, Amba Kali and Roopa Kali.

Suchchi Kali

Suchchi Kali is bond under 42 Maatras.

Amba Kali

Amba Kali deals within 42 to 45 Maatras.

Roopa Kali

In Roopa Kali Maatras reaches up to 52. The popular kali, Tere Tille Ton, belongs to this type

== Dev Tharike Wala and Kuldeep Manak ==
Dev Tharike Wala and Kuldeep Manak are the first personalities to introduce Kali to a common man. One of the kalian, Tere Tille Ton, written by Dev and sung by Manak, became so popular that people started regarding the singer as Kalian Da Badshah (English: King of Kalis). Manak sang only 13-14 Kalian in his career. People treated his every song, after Tere Tille Ton, to be a 'kali' as ordinary people don't understand the difference between a song and kali.

== Kalian by Kuldeep Manak ==
The very popular Kali of Manak, Tere Tille Ton, is a Roopa Kali. List of Kalian/Kaliyan sung by Manak:

Written by Dev Tharike Wala

1. Tere Tille Ton
2. Chhanna Choori Da
3. Ranjhe Da Patka
4. Pind Taan Sialan De Dhee Jammi Chaudhari
5. Teri Khatir Heere
6. Sehti Heer Ne Tiari Kar Layi Bagh Di
7. Charhi Jawani Te Chann Sooraj (Heer Dian Maa Naal)
8. Ik Din Kaidon Satth Vich (Kaidon Dian Choochak Naal)
9. Gall Sun Sialan Diye Kurhiye Ni
10. Ik Din Mil Ke Chaak Nu

Written by others

1. Amb Da Boota Rehnda.. (Gurmukh Singh Gill, JaboMaajra)
2. Ni Putt Jattan Da.. (Gurmukh Singh Gill, JaboMaajra)
3. Sehti Hassdi-Hassdi.. (Dalip Singh Sidhu, Kanakwal)

== See also ==
- Ik Tara
- Teri Khatar Heere
