= Khooni Mahal =

- Directed by: Mohan Bhakri
- Starring: Shoma Anand; Neelam Mehra; Hussein Khan
- Music by: Nadeem-Shravan
- Release date: 27 May 1987

Khooni Mahal is a 1987 Bollywood horror film directed by Mohan Bhakri. It is a pornographic Hindi horror film. It was the first Bollywood film where an unknown naked female was picturised without being censored, having sex with Raza Murad, Javed Khan and Raj Kiran, who were the lead actors. Neelam Mehra shot some hot scenes, which were later censored.

== Plot ==
In a village, at one night the landlord Jagira is affected by ghost soul and starts killing villagers. The village had a well established people but after incidence Jagira beaten to death by villagers, villagers left the village. Jagira at deathbed vows to take revenge those who will reside in his residence. After few years of this incidence, a newly married couple are traveling near by takes shelter at this residence. The couple is killed by the angry ghost of Jagira who is now turned into a bad soul.

== Cast ==
- Raj Kiran as Raj
- Raza Murad
- Hussein Khan
- Jagdeep
- Shoma Anand
- Neelam Mehra as Kiran
- Huma Khan
- Madhu Malhotra
- Abhijeet Sen
- Satish Kaul
- Anu Dhawan

== Soundtrack ==
1. "Jalta Hai Tan" - N/A
2. "Main To Hungama Kar Loonga" - Vinod Rathod
3. "Maine Dil Tumko Diya Tune Dil Mujhko Diya" - Anuradha Paudwal, Mohammed Aziz
