= Javed Khan (actor) =

Indian actor

- Born: Javed Yaqub Khan; Bhopal, Madhya Pradesh, India
- Occupations: Film and television Actor
- Years active: 1982–present
- Children: 1

Javed Khan (born as Javed Yaqub Khan in Bhopal, Madhya Pradesh, India) is an Indian film and television former actor and former model. He studied at the Film and Television Institute of India, Pune.

Javed Khan was born in Bhopal, Madhya Pradesh. His father, Mohammed Yaqub Khan, was a top criminal lawyer in Madhya Pradesh and his mother, Raisa Yaqub, was a royal, making Khan hail from one of the most prominent families of central India. Khan did his schooling at Campion School, Bhopal. He topped the Merit List in both high school and the higher secondary board of Madhya Pradesh. He went back to school and became school captain in 1979 after passing out from FTII (PUNE) 1974-76 and the troop leader of Air Scouts, having qualified for the highest award, that of President Scout with 24 proficiency badges. After school, Khan joined the St. Xavier's College, Mumbai, for his B. Sc. in mathematics and economics.

== Career ==
=== Modeling ===
While in his first month in St. Xavier's College, Mumbai, Khan was spotted by director Shyam Benegal, who at that time headed an Ad-Film concern. Khan did his first ad-film for him, the product being Colgate Toothpaste. Followed by a string of assignments, including Gold Spot, Bombay Dyeing, Arvind Mills, and Nescafé, with some top names in the advertisement world such as Zafar Hai, Pradeep Kakkad, Kailash Surendranath and Agencies like Lintas, H.T.A., Frank Simoes, Bensons, Chaitra, Trio Films, and Everest. He was further auditioned and selected by Jeannie Naoroji and Hilla Sethna, of the fashion industry. Khan made his debut in the fashion show world, on the occasion of the opening of the Oberoi Sheraton, now known as Oberoi Trident, in Mumbai.

After his first fashion show, he joined the Film and Television Institute of India, Pune. After returning to Mumbai, he was signed by Reliance Industries, a then-new company for the ONLY VIMAL campaign. Khan continued to appear in fashion shows, working with Vimla Patil, Salome and Nazir Mitha, Shanti and Sangeeta Chopra on circuit show for Femina, Eves Weekly, S. Kumars, Vimal. Bombay Dyeing etc.

=== Acting ===
Recruited by a producer, Khan signed on for his debut film while still at the F.T.I.I. His first film was Apradhi Kaun?. It collected 100% at the box office in the first week, but was not much heard of in Bollywood, being a small budget film. Nevertheless, Javed was labeled as "the heartthrob" and won the Most Promising Newcomer of the Year Award along with other felicitations from critics, film journalists, clubs and fan clubs in small centers. Then came Chambal Ke Daku, with real dreaded dacoits Madho Singh and Mohar Singh playing themselves. Cheekh, Qatil Aur Ashiq, Khooni Mahal, Khofnak Mahal, Ram Ki Ganga, Paanch Fauladi, Kafan, Ghar Aakhir Ghar Hai, Kabrastan, Amavas Ki Raat and Aaj Ka M.L.A.. with Rajesh Khanna and Shabana Azmi are some of the films Khan has done as a leading hero. He was also seen in a very brief appearance in Raja Ki Aayegi Baraat, starring Rani Mukerji.

Khan shifted his focus to television. He played Tej Singh, in Chandrakanta. He further portrayed some other characters in serials like Yug, Betaal Pachisi, Zee Horror Show, Nagin, Fasana, Main Dilli Hoon, Ramayan and The Trap. He played the character of Maharaja Puru in the serial Shakuntala on Star One.

Khan launched an acting academy in 2004 in Bhopal, Madhya Pradesh by the name of Glamour Zone—Javed Khan's academy of acting and modeling. The academy was inaugurated by the Cultural Minister of Madhya Pradesh, Laxmikant Sharma and the first convocation ceremony of the academy was done by the then Chief Minister of Madhya Pradesh, Babulal Gaur. The academy has on its advisory council, Ravi Chopra, David Dhawan and Roshan Taneja among others. Over 100 students have successfully completed the training.

== Personal life ==
Khan was the president of SCUD, Society for Children who are Underdeveloped and Disabled, which provides free but quality education to special and needy children all over India, especially in M.P. which is his home state.

== Selected filmography ==
- 1982 Apradhi Kaun? as Anand
- 1982 Chambal Ke Daku
- 1985 Cheekh as Sunil
- 1986 Qatil aur Ashiq
- 1988 Paanch Fauladi
- 1989 Khooni Murda as Dev
- 1990 Lohe Ke Haath as Jainath
- 1991 Kasam Kali Ki as Akram Khan
- 1991 Hatyarin as Vicky
- 1991 Aakhri Cheekh as Jeet Khurana
- 1996 Khoon Ki Pyasi as Kishan
