= Kabrastan =

- Directed by: Mohan Bhakri
- Produced by: Mohan Bhakri
- Starring: Amjad Khan; Raza Murad; Jagdeep; Kunika; Hemant Birje
- Cinematography: Arvind Bhakri
- Edited by: L.D. Bhatia
- Music by: Jagdish Khanna; Uttam Singh
- Release date: 10 June 1988
- Running time: 135 minutes
- Language: Hindi

Kabrastan is a 1988 low budget Hindi horror film directed and produced by Mohan Bhakri. This film was released on 10 June 1988.

== Plot ==
Dr. William D’Souza, an ambitious cardiologist who dreams of performing successful heart transplants. When a patient urgently needs a fresh heart, William murderously kills a man named Anthony to get the organ and transplants it into his patient. Although the surgery succeeds, William’s crime unleashes a terrifying supernatural force. Anthony’s vengeful spirit awakens and begins haunting William’s family with eerie disturbances and violent revenge. As the haunting escalates, strange possessions and mysterious deaths occur, pulling William’s loved ones deeper into a nightmare they cannot easily escape. The ghost’s wrath spreads beyond just William, threatening everyone connected to the deadly secret he tried to hide.

== Cast ==
- Hemant Birje as Rocky D'Souza
- Amjad Khan as Napoleon D'Costa
- Javed Khan as Mike
- Kunickaa Sadanand as Kitty
- Raza Murad as William D'Souza
- Jagdeep as Hitler
- Huma Khan as Madhumati
- Satish Kaul as Inspector
- Kamna
- Daljeet Kaur
- Ram Mohan as Priest
- Birbal as Butler
- Ved Goswami
- Sunil Dhawan
