= Apradhi Kaun? (1982 film) =

- Poster
- Directed by: Mohan Bhakri
- Written by: Mohan Bhakri
- Produced by: K.M. Bhakri
- Starring: Javed Khan; Raza Murad; Iftekhar; Dara Singh; Tun Tun; Om Shivpuri; Madan Puri; Ram Mohan; Manorama
- Music by: Nadeem–Shravan
- Production company: MKB Films
- Release date: 1982
- Country: India
- Language: Hindi

Apradhi Kaun? (transl. Who is the perpetrator?) is a 1982 Indian Hindi-language mystery film directed by Mohan Bhakri and produced by K. M. Bhakri. It marked the debut of Javed Khan.

== Plot ==
The story revolves around a young boy, Anand, who is wrongfully accused of the murder of a lady, Madhvi, who was bored with her marriage and eyed Anand. Anand is blackmailed with pictures and threats.

== Cast ==
Cast
Actor	Role
Javed Khan	Anand
Raza Murad	
Iftekhar	
Dara Singh	
Tun Tun	
Om Shivpuri	
Madan Puri	
Ram Mohan	
Rajendra Nath	
Manorama	
Birbal	
Arpana Chaudhry	

== Soundtrack ==
The film's music was composed by Nadeem–Shravan. It has only one song, "Ek Raat Sunsaan Sadak Se", sung by Amit Kumar.
