= Surinder Shinda =

Indian singer (1953–2023)

- Born: Surinder Pal Dhammi; 20 May 1953; Choti Ayali, Ludhiana district, Punjab, India
- Died: 26 July 2023 (aged 70) Ludhiana, Punjab, India
- Genres: Punjabi music
- Occupations: Singer; actor
- Years active: 1978–2017

Surinder Pal Dhammi (20 May 1953 – 26 July 2023), better known as Surinder Shinda, was an Indian singer of Punjabi music who is considered a "grandfather of MOC (Music on Console)", and has been described as "legendary". He had numerous hit songs including "Jatt Jeona Morh", "Putt Jattan De", "Truck Billiya", "Balbiro Bhabhi" and "Kaher Singh Di Mout". He has also appeared in Punjabi films such as Putt Jattan De and Ucha Dar Babe Nanak Da.

== Early life ==
Surinder Shinda was born Surinder Pal Dhammi in a Ramgharia Sikh family on 20 May 1953 in Choti Ayali village, Ludhiana district, Punjab.

== Career ==
Shinda began singing in 1959 and released close to 165 music albums. He also started an orchestra company. In later years, he worked as a producer for younger artists. In addition, his latest album Dhulla Bhatti was successful in the Punjabi music market. One of Shinda's last singles was "Hemis Boliyan."

Shinda was a colleague of the Punjabi singer Kuldeep Manak and has also taught music to the late Amar Singh Chamkila, Gill Hardeep, Maninder Shinda, Shiv Simran Pal Shinda's son. He is famous for his Kali singing style with Kuldeep Manak and several others. His "Jeona Morh" is considered a legend in Punjabi music. His song "Badla Le Layeen Sohneya" is one of the greatest hits of Punjabi music.

== Personal life and death ==
Shinda was married to the cousin of Dev Tharikewala's wife, who is known to have written lyrics for Shinda and Kuldeep Manak.

Surinder Shinda died on 26 July 2023 due to multi organ failure, at the age of 70. He was survived by his son, Maninder Shinda, who is a musician.

== Awards ==
Shinda received a Lifetime Achievement award at the 2013 Brit Asia TV Music Awards.

Shinda was honoured by the Punjab Government with the 'Shiromani Gayak Award,' while Kala Parishad bestowed on him the Punjab Gaurav Rattan title.

== Discography ==
Year	Album	Record label
2022	Hakk (Music: Lali Dhaliwal, Lyrics: Karamjit Puri)	OnClick Music (Movietone Digital Entertainment)
2017	Vella – The Time (Music: B Praak, Lyrics: Jaani)	T-Series
2017	Gabru Punjab De (Music: Tru Skool and Kaos Productions)	Moviebox Records/T-Series
2017	Chori Chori (Music: Sukshinder Shinda)	Kamlee Records/T-Series
2013	Nintendo Star (Music: Ravi Bal)	Kamlee Records
2012	Dhulla Bhatti	Amar Audio
2011	Jatt Dil Lai Gaya	Anand Audio
2010	Gaddi Shinde Di	Indya Records
2006	Jagga Jatt	MPI
2005	Putt Sardaran De	
2005	Gaddi Jatt Di	
2005	Jatti Ashiq Tere Te	
2003	Lock Down	Kismet Records
2002	Gaddi 6 Cilander Di	Saregama
2000	Bol Punjab De	Kismet Records
1999	Teeyan Longowal Diyan	Saregama
1999	Oh Tera Kee Lagda	His Master's Voice
1998	Shinde Diyan Kaliyan	Saregama
1997	Ucha Burj Lahore Da (Kalian)	Saregama
1997	Put Sardaran De (with Skillz Inc. Productions)	Roma Music Bank
1997	Jatt Mirza Kharlan Da	Saregama
1997	Kurhian Vajaon Tarhian	
1996	Talaak Amli Da	T-Series
1994	Jattiye Ni Jattiye	
1994	Ghund Chakk Mar De Saloot Goriye	Saregama
1993	Gallan Sohne Yaar Diyan	T-Series
1992	Ik Kuri Mainu Telephone Kardi	DMC Records
1992	Sucha Surma	DMC Records
1991	Teri Fiat Te Jeth Nazare Lainda	Saregama
1990	Jad Miyan Biwi Raji	Saregama
1990	Yenki Love You Karde	Saregama
1989	Dilli Shera Diyan Khudiyan	
1989	Dhol	Multitone Records
1989	Main Diggi Tilak Ke	Saregama
1988	Jaan Amlee Di	EMI
1987	Haani	T-Series
1985	Jeona Maurh	EMI
1982	Surinder Shinda Live	
1981	Put Jattan De OST	
1979	Rakh Ley Clinder Yaara	

== Duo collaboration ==
Year	Track	Record label
2017	Nakhro with Rupin Kahlon	Trendz Music
2016	Majajne with JSL Singh	Speed Records
2014	Jeonde Rehn Truckan Wale with Sukshinder Shinda	MovieBox
2013	Dil Nachde with HMC & Dr. Zeus	T-Series
2011	Yaari Hove with Surinder Laddi	Saregama
2011	Sweetnezz with Maninder Shinda and DJ Outlaw	The Sound Pipe Records
2011	Glassy Nachdi with Bhinda Jatt and DJ Vix	Kamlee Records
2010	The Shinda Duet with Highflyers and Maninder Shinda	The Sound Pipe Records

== Filmography ==
Year	Film	Character
2022	22 Chamkila Forever	Himself
2015	Gun & Goal	Inspector Didar Singh
2013	Punjab Bolda	Faqeer
2014	Kaim Sardari	Sardara
2012	Rehmataan	Baba
2012	Just Punjabi	Mohammed Singh
2006	Ek Jind Ek Jaan	
2001	Sikandera	
1997	Truck Driver	Bachan Singh
1996	Tabaahi	Thanedar Harnek Singh
1996	Charda Suraj	Sukha- Suraj's father
1995	Bagawat	Harnek
1993	Ankhila Soorma	Live performance- Akhara
1992	Jatt Walaity	Shinda
1991	Dil Da Mamla	Live performance- Akhara
1991	Jatt Jeona Mour	inspector Gajjan Singh
1991	Badla Jatti Da	Shinda
1990	Anakh Jattan Dee	Shinda
1989	Tunka Pyar Da	
1988	Patola	Dharma
1986	Kee Banu Duniyan Daa	Shinda
1986	Gabhroo Punjab Da	Live performance- Akhara
1985	Ucha Dar Babe Nanak Da	Faqeer Singer
1983	Putt Jattan De	Shinda
