= Long Da Lishkara =

1983 film

Laung Da Lishkara
- Directed by: Harpal Tiwana
- Produced by: Harpal Tiwana
- Starring: Raj Babbar; Om Puri; Gurdas Mann; Nina Tiwana; Mehar Mittal; Harpreet Deol
- Music by: Jagjit Singh and Chitra Singh
- Release date: 1983
- Country: India
- Language: Punjabi

Long Da Lishkara or Laung Da Lishkara is an Indian Punjabi movie released in 1983 directed and produced by Harpal Tiwana.

Under Jagjit Singh's music direction Gurdas Maan sang "Challa" in this film. Jagjit Singh sang "Ishq Hai Loko," "Main Kandyali Thor Ve" for this film. The lyrics were written by Shiv Kumar Batalvi and "Sare Pindch Puare Paye" written by Inderjit Hasanpuri.

== Cast ==
- Raj Babbar - Raja
- Om Puri - Dittu
- Gurdas Mann - Channa
- Nina Tiwana - Sardarni Sarup Kaur
- Harpreet Deol - Preeto
- Nirmal Rishi - Gulabo Maasi
- Sardar Sohi - Taaya Naara
- Mehar Mittal - Rurhiya Kubba
- Manjit Maan - Taaro
