= Paanch Fauladi =

- Directed by: Mohan Bhakri
- Screenplay by: Ranbir Pushp
- Produced by: Neelu Bhakri; Inderjeet Walia
- Starring: Raj Babbar; Anita Raj; Hemant Birje; Dara Singh; Amjad Khan
- Music by: Uttam-Jagdish
- Release date: 13 January 1989
- Country: India
- Language: Hindi

Paanch Fauladi is a 1989 Indian Hindi-language action film directed by Mohan Bhakri. It stars Raj Babbar, Anita Raj, Hemant Birje, Dara Singh and Amjad Khan in pivotal roles.

== Plot ==
This is the revenge story of 5 friends who suffer loss by the enemies.

== Cast ==
- Dara Singh as Ustad (Fauladi 1)
- Raj Babbar as Raja (Fauladi 2)
- Hemant Birje as (Fauladi 3)
- Javed Khan as (Fauladi 4)
- Amjad Khan as Dilawar Khan (Fauladi 5)
- Salma Agha as Julie
- Anita Raj as Annu
- Ram Mohan as Zamindar Shamsher Singh
- Bob Christo as Seth (Englishman)
- Raza Murad as Jarawar Singh
- Huma Khan as Jarawar Singh's mistress
- Seema Deo as Parvati
- Satish Kaul as Shyam
- Sonika Gill as Geetha

== Soundtrack ==
Song	Singer
"Koi Kahe Jaani"	Anuradha Paudwal
"Zara Chal Sambhalke"	Lata Mangeshkar, Suresh Wadkar
"Jis Ladki Se Tumko"	Shailendra Singh, Suresh Wadkar
"Aaj Behna Ki Shaadi Hai, Jhoomo Nacho Gao"	Mahendra Kapoor, Shailendra Singh, Suresh Wadkar
"Aaj Behna Ki Shaadi Hai" (Sad)	Mahendra Kapoor
"Lach Lach Lachke"	Asha Bhosle
