= Jalal, Punjab =

Jalal
- village
- Location in Punjab, India
- Coordinates: 30.479°N 75.164°E
- Country: India
- State: Punjab
- District: Bathinda

Population (2011)
  - Total: 6,500

Languages
  - Official: Punjabi
  - Regional: Punjabi
- Time zone: UTC+5:30 (IST)

Jalal is a village located in the Bathinda district of Punjab, India. Baba Jalal found this area and named it as village Jalal. It was also known as ਅੱਠ ਜਲਾਲਾ ਵਾਲਾ (Aṭha jalālā vālā) because the relatives of Baba Jalal lived in eight nearby villages.

The population of the village was reported as 6,500 in 2011. The village has around 400 Muslims. Punjabi singer, Kuldeep Manak, hailed from and is buried here.
