= Eka Lakhani =

Indian costume fashion designer and entrepreneur

- Born: 1987 (age 38–39)
- Occupations: Fashion costume designer, celebrity stylist
- Known for: Fashion designing

Eka Lakhani (born 1987) is an Indian fashion costume designer, who has worked in the Hindi, Tamil and Telugu film industries. After beginning her career as an intern on the sets of Raavan (2010), she has become director Mani Ratnam's costume designer for his films since 2013. She has also worked in projects by directors Rajkumar Hirani, Karan Johar and Gautham Menon.

== Career ==
Lakhani studied fashion design at SNDT Women's University, Mumbai for three years, and then spent a year at Fashion Institute of Technology, New York City. During the period, she assisted designers during New York Fashion Week. Once she returned to India, she worked as an intern with Sabyasachi Mukherjee during the making of Mani Ratnam's bilingual Raavan (2010) aged 23. The film's cinematographer Santosh Sivan subsequently hired her to be the principal costume designer for his Malayalam period drama, Urumi (2011), set in 15th century Kerala. For the film, she had to dress actors including Vidya Balan, Genelia D'Souza and Tabu in Portuguese and Indian period costumes.

Impressed by her work in Urumi, Mani Ratnam signed her to be the main costume designer in Kadal (2013). She also portrayed a minor role in the film as the wife of the character portrayed by Arjun. She later continued to regularly collaborate with Mani Ratnam, winning acclaim for her work for actresses Nithya Menen and Aditi Rao Hydari in O Kadhal Kanmani (2015) and Kaatru Veliyidai (2017), respectively. For the upcoming period drama Ponniyin Selvan: I (2022), Lakhani travelled to Tanjore temples to study sculptures, meet weavers, and understand the heritage before starting the process of designing.

Lakhani has often worked on biopics, including on films such as Sanju (2018) on Sanjay Dutt and the web series Queen (2019) on Jayalalithaa. To prepare for biopics, she often met people involved on the stories to better reflect their fashion sense during the respective historical periods.

In 2019, she set up "Team E" in which senior designers work on projects under her supervision. The first project handled by Team E was the Madras Talkies production, Vaanam Kottattum (2020).

== Notable filmography ==
As actress

- Abhay (1994) - Priyanka Nayak (child artist)
- Kadal (2013) - Bergmans' late wife (uncredited cameo)
- One by Two (2014)

As costume designer

- Urumi (2011)
- Kadal (2013)
- Ceylon (2013)
- One by Two (2014)
- Gulaab Gang (2014)
- O Kadhal Kanmani (2015)
- NH10 (2015)
- Crazy Cukkad Family (2015)
- 24 (2016)
- Iru Mugan (2016)
- Ok Jaanu (2017)
- Kaatru Veliyidai (2017)
- Haseena Parkar (2017)
- Welcome to New York (2018)
- Lust Stories (2018)
- Soorma (2018)
- Fanney Khan (2018)
- Sanju (2018)
- Chekka Chivantha Vaanam (2018)
- Total Dhamaal (2019)
- The Sky Is Pink (2019)
- Adithya Varma (2019)
- Queen (2019)
- Ala Vaikunthapurramuloo (2020)
- Vaanam Kottattum (2020)
- Ghost Stories (2020)
- Masaba Masaba (2020)
- V (2020)
- Maara (2020)
- 99 Songs (2021)
- Shershaah (2021)
- Radhe Shyam (2022)
- Ponniyin Selvan: I (2022)
- Ponniyin Selvan: II (2023)
- Rocky Aur Rani Kii Prem Kahaani (2023)
- Leo (2023)
- Dunki (2023)
- Thug Life (2025)
