= Ik Tara =

Ik Tara Iktara

Studio album by Kuldeep Manak
- Released: 1976
- Recorded: 1975
- Genre: Punjabi folk
- Label: His Master's Voice

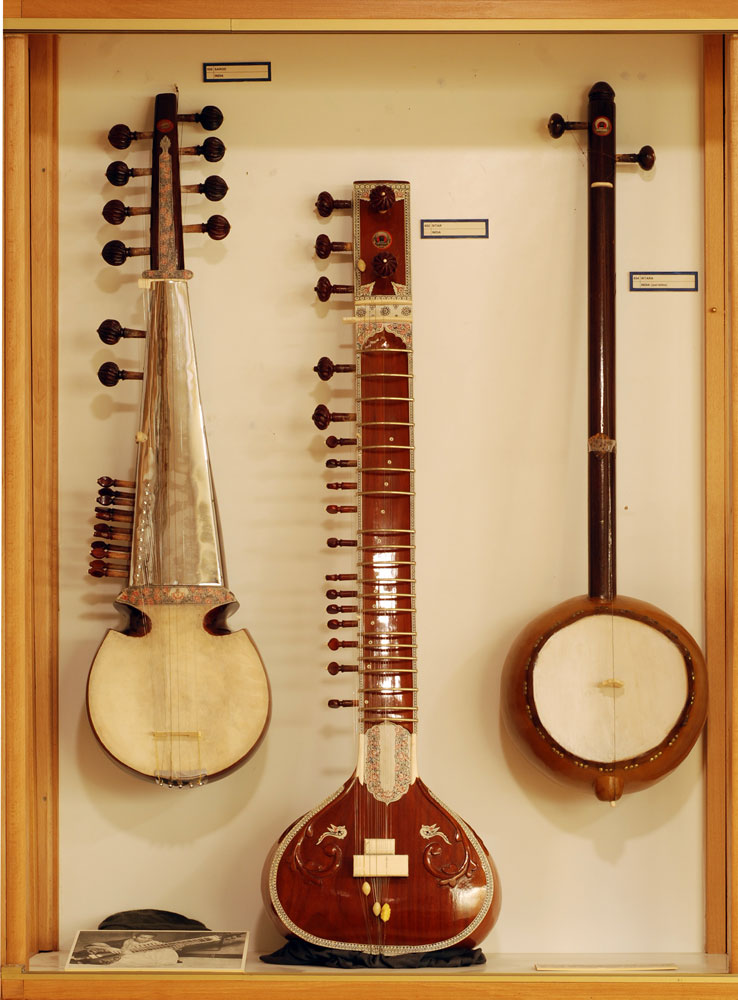
Sarod, Sitar and Iktara

Ik Tara (Punjabi: ਇਕ ਤਾਰਾ), also spelled as Iktara or sometimes Ektara', was the first LP record of Kuldeep Manak released by His Master's Voice in 1976. It was released after about one year of recording as the record manager of His Master's Voice, Zaheer Ahmad, delayed its release as he was frightened the record would not do well in the market.

== Music ==
Kesar Singh Narula composed the music and the lyricists mainly includes Dev Tharike Wala (also known as Hardev Dilgir).

== Track listing ==
1. Tere Tille Ton (Kali)
2. Chheti Kar Sarwan Bachcha
3. Chithian Sahiban Jatti Ne
4. Mere Yaar Nu Manda Na Bolin
5. Kaulan
6. Garh Mughlane Dian Naaran

== Response ==
The record was a huge success specially the kali, Tere Tille Ton, established Manak as Kalian Da Badshah (English: King of Kalis) although he sang only about 13 kalis in his career.

== See also ==
- Teri Khatar Heere
- Tere Tille Ton
