= Qatil Aur Ashiq =

Qatil Aur Aashiq
- Directed by: Swaroop Kumar
- Starring: Javed Khan; Shoma Anand; Vijayendra Ghatge; Zarina Wahab
- Music by: Nadeem-Shravan
- Release date: 1986
- Country: India
- Language: Hindi

Qatil Aur Aashiq is a 1986 Bollywood action film directed by Swaroop Kumar starring Javed Khan as the hero and Shoma Anand as heroine.

== Cast ==
- Javed Khan as Ravi
- Shoma Anand as Rekha
- Vijayendra Ghatge as Inspector Rajesh
- Zarina Wahab as Savitri
- Kalpana Iyer as Kamini
- Raza Murad as Prithvi
- Om Shivpuri as Ranjeet

== Music ==
Lyrics: Anjaan

1. "Garma Garam Meri Jawani" – Alka Yagnik, Vinay Mandke
2. "Moti Moti Rotiya Pakana Tu Dhobaniya" – Kishore Kumar, Anuradha Paudwal
3. "Pyar Hota Hai Kya" – Asha Bhosle, Suresh Wadkar
4. "Sawan Ke Mausam Mein Dil" – Suresh Wadkar, Anuradha Paudwal
5. "Teri Meri Preet" – Asha Bhosle, Shabbir Kumar
