= Khofnak Mahal =

- Directed by: Sushil Vyas
- Produced by: Vikram A. Patel
- Production company: V.P. Enterprises
- Release date: 1 January 1998
- Country: India
- Language: Hindi

Khofnak Mahal is a Hindi horror film of Bollywood directed by Sushil Vyas and produced by Vikram A. Patel. This film was released in 1998 under the banner of V.P. Enterprises.

== Cast ==
- Raza Murad
- Pramod Moutho
- Usha Khanna
- Narendra Nath
- Javed Khan
- Rakesh Pandey
- Seema Vaz
- Brijesh
