= Santo Banto =

- Directed by: Ajit Singh Deol
- Written by: Veerindra
- Produced by: Darshan Singh and Veerindra
- Starring: Dharmendra; Veerendra; Shatrughan Sinha
- Cinematography: S.S. Chadda
- Edited by: M.D. Malekar
- Music by: S. Mohinder
- Distributed by: loop
- Release date: 1976
- Country: India
- Language: Punjabi

Santo Banto is a 1976 Punjabi film starring Dharmendra.

== Cast ==
- Veerendra ... Jeeta
- Aruna Irani ... Santo/Banto (dual role)
- Shatrughan Sinha ... Karma (special appearance)
- Dharmendra ... Cameo appearance
- Manmohan Krishan as Santo/Banto Father
- Randhir
- Brahm Chari
- K.D. Singh
- Manju Bhatia
- Mumtaz Begum as Jeeta mother
- Seema Kapoor ... Bhajni
- Mehar Mittal ... Laala Shauki Ram
- Ajit Singh Deol ... Jagga Bhalwaan
- Darshan Bagga ... Jora (as Darshan Singh)
- Shetty ... Kaalu Smuggler
- Narinder Biba ... Special appearance in Ladies Sangeet-Boliyan
- Tun Tun ... Banarsi's wife
