= Bhavana Bhatt =

Indian actress

- Occupation: Actress
- Notable work: Do Jasoos Naya Daur (1978) Sassi Punnu Jatt Punjabi Rano Jeeja Saali Chamak Challo Maujan Dubai Diyan

Bhavana Bhatt is an Indian actress who has worked in Hindi and Punjabi films.

Bhatt started her career in the Hindi film Do Jasoos, where she worked with famous actors such as Raj Kapoor and Rajendra Kumar. Later she acted opposite Rishi Kapoor in Naya Daur in 1978. She also appeared in many Punjabi films including Sassi Punnu, Jatt Punjabi, Rano, Jeeja Saali, Chamak Challo, and Maujan Dubai Diyan. Most of her Punjabi films were opposite actor Satish Kaul.

== Filmography ==
1. Jai Maa Karwa Chauth (1994)
2. Jeeja Sali (1985)
3. Maujaan Dubai Diyaan (1985)
4. Bagga Daku (1983)
5. Sassi Punnu (1983) as a Sassi
6. Chhammak Chhallo (1982)
7. Nek Parveen (1982)
8. Raano (1981)
9. Patita (1980)
10. Jatt Punjabi (1979)
11. Naya Daur (1978)
12. Lachhi (1977) Punjabi Movie
13. Phir Janam Lenge Hum (1977)
14. Do Jasoos (1975) (as Bhavna Bhatt) ... Pinky Verma.
