= Giddha (film) =

- Poster of Hindi dubbed version
- Directed by: B.S. Shaad
- Produced by: Ruplal Sanger
- Music by: Mahinder Dehlvi, Ved Pal
- Release date: 20 October 1978
- Country: India
- Language: Punjabi

Giddha is an Indian Punjabi-language film starring Dharmendra, Sujit Kumar, Dara Singh, Veerendra and Mala Jaggi. The film was later dubbed in Hindi as Zakhmi Dil and released in 1983.

== Cast ==
- Dharmendra as Bantoo
- Dara Singh as Dulla Bhalwaan
- Daljit Kaur as Jeeto Masterni
- Navin Nischol as Special Appearance
- Veerendra as Dr Balveer
- Mala Jaggi as Roop

== Soundtrack ==
All lyrics are written by Mahendra Dehlvi.

No.	Title	Singer(s)	Length
1.	"Sasural To Hai Sabhi Ko Pyara"	Dilraj Kaur, Savita Suman
2.	"Mere Peer Hove Se"	Dilraj Kaur, Savita Suman
3.	"Aanchal Sarke Bindiya Chamke"	Dilraj Kaur
4.	"Mera Chandi Ka Challa"	Dilraj Kaur
5.	"Naa Tur Sapni Ki Tor"	Meenu Purushottam, Suresh Wadkar
6.	"Raah Mushkil Mod Anjaane"	Asha Bhosle
