= Tere Tille Ton =

Song by Kuldeep Manak

from the album Ik Tara
- Language: Punjabi
- Released: 1976
- Recorded: 1975
- Genre: Kali (Folk)
- Length: 3:40
- Label: His Master's Voice
- Composer: Kesar Singh Narula
- Lyricist: Hardev Dilgir

Tere Tille Ton (Punjabi: ਤੇਰੇ ਟਿੱਲੇ ਤੋਂ) is a kali released in 1976 on Kuldeep Manak's first LP, Ik Tara, by His Master's Voice. The music was composed by Kesar Singh Narula and the lyrics were penned by Hardev Dilgir (also known as Dev Tharike Wala). Zaheer Ahmad, the record manager of HMV, delayed its release by one year as he was suggested that the record will not do so well. Finally, on the request of Manak and Hardev, the record was released in limited copies and was a huge success.

== Tracks ==
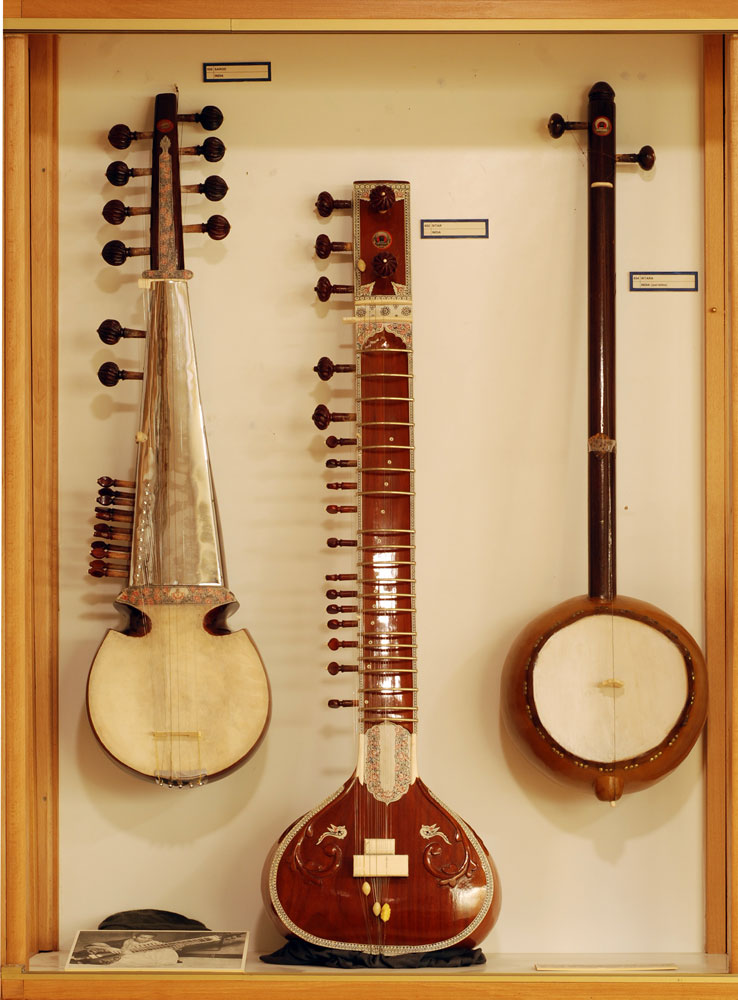
Sarod, Sitar and Iktara

Along with, Tere Tille Ton, the LP also had Chheti Kar Sarwan Bachcha, Mere Yaar Nu Manda Na Bolin, Kaulan, Chithian Sahiban Jatti Ne and Garh Mughlane Dian Naaran.

== See also ==
- Kali
