= Abhay (1994 film) =

- Directed by: Annu Kapoor
- Starring: Nana Patekar; Mayank Sharma; Eka Lakhani; Ankit Desai
- Cinematography: Sudarshan Nag
- Edited by: Bhaskar Sunder
- Music by: Vishal Bharadwaj
- Release date: 1994
- Running time: 121 minutes
- Country: India
- Language: Hindi

Abhay — The Fearless is an Indian children's film directed by Annu Kapoor. An adaptation of Oscar Wilde's 1887 short story, "The Canterville Ghost", it was produced by the Children's Film Society, India, and features Nana Patekar as the ghost. The film also stars Benjamin Gilani and Moon Moon Sen.

== Plot ==
The Nayaks disregard rumours that the house they have moved into is haunted by the ghost of its former owner Rana. Their three children take delight in these ghost stories and desire to meet the ghost. Meanwhile, Rana and his fellow ghost, unhappy with this intrusion, plot to scare the new owners. As the living pit their wits against the ghosts, secrets tumble that will not just shed more light on the ghosts’ pasts, but also show that children are not meek creatures to be cowed down by the fear of the unknown.

== Cast ==
- Nana Patekar as Rana Digvijay Singh
- Mayank Sharma as Rahul Nayak
- Eka Lakhani as Priyanka Nayak
- Ankit Desai as Ishan Nayak
- Moon Moon Sen
- Benjamin Gilani

== Awards ==
The film won Best Children’s Film at the 42nd National Film Awards.
