= Do Sher =

- Poster
- Directed by: Sukhdev Ahluwalia
- Starring: Dharmendra; Rajendra Kumar
- Music by: Sonik Omi
- Release date: 1974
- Country: India
- Language: Hindi

Do Sher is a 1974 Bollywood film starring Dharmendra.

== Cast ==
- Dharmendra
- Rajendra Kumar
