= Nimmo (film) =

- Directed by: Veerendra
- Starring: Veerendra; Priti Sapru; Daljit Kaur; Mohan Singh Baggad; Shammi; Yash Sharma; Mehar Mittal
- Music by: Kamal Kant Mishra
- Release date: 1984
- Country: India
- Language: Punjabi

Nimmo (Punjabi: ਨਿੰਮੋ) is a 1984 Punjabi film, directed by Veerendra, starring Veerendra, Priti Sapru, Mohan Singh Baggad, Mehar Mittal with Daljit Kaur's guest appearance and more. Kamal Kant Mishra composed the music.

== Music ==
The title song is by Channi Singh from the band Alaap. Other songs were written by Bhulla Ram Chann (Chann Goraya Wala), Blram Mast, Sikander Bharti, S.S Azad and Salma Agha.

1. "Ek Too Hover Ek Main" – Salma Agha, Suresh Wadkar
2. "Balle Balle" – Mahendra Kapoor, Anuradha Paudwal
3. "Gal Sun Ve Thanderara " – Mahendra Kapoor, Anuradha Paudwal
4. "Sassi Nal Bair Ku Kamaya" – Anuradha Paudwal
5. "Yaad Karegi Payar Nu Mere" – Suresh Wadkar
6. "Chamka Ne Pendiyan" – Salma Agha
7. "Joo Joo Tere Bhagat" – Prof. Darshan Singh Ji Khalsa
8. "Chhota Devra Bhabhi" – Salma Agha, Veerendra Katyal
9. "Hee Aakhadi" – Veerendra Katyal
