= Mohan Bhakri =

Indian film director (died 2024)

Mohan Bhakri (died 18 April 2024) was an Indian b movie producer and director during the 1980s. He produced many Hindi B movies, mostly in the horror genre. He is best known for his two horror films, Apradhi Kaun? (1982) and Cheekh (1984). He died on 18 April 2024.

== Filmography ==
- Ab Tumhari Bari
- Woh Bewafa Thi
- Apradhi Kaun? (1982)
- Insaan Bana Shaitan
- Roohani Taaqat
- Vyah Da Dhol
- Maula Jatt
- Amavas Ki Raat
- Khooni Murda
- Sau Saal Baad
- Paanch Fauladi
- Kabrastan (1988)
- Padosi Ki Biwi
- Paanch Fauladi
- Khooni Mahal
- Jag Chanan Hoya
- Cheekh (1984)
- Jeeja Sali
- Do Madari
- Vohti Hath Soti
- Jatt Da Gandasa
- Jatti (1980)
