= Sukhdev Ahluwalia =

Indian film director

Sukhdev Ahluwalia (born January 5, 1932) is a Punjabi film director.

Ahluwalia began his career in the film industry as an assistant cameraman with Modern Studios working with the director Suraj Prakash on a number of Flindi films before turning to writing and directing melodrama. He later worked in video.

His filmography includes: Do Sher (1974), Dharamjeet (1975), Taakra (1976), Do Sholay (1977), Jai Mata Sheran Wali (1978), Til Til Da Lekha (1979), Kunwara Mama (1979), Ambe Maa Jagadambe Maa (1980), Sajre Phoolhttp://www.ultraindia.com/film-details/5194-sajjare-phool-khilte-suman (1981), Kashmeera (1983), Maanwan Thandian Chhanwan (1984), Takraar (1985), Maahi Mera Chan Varga (1987), Sounh Menoo Punja Di (1990).
