= Inderjit Hasanpuri =

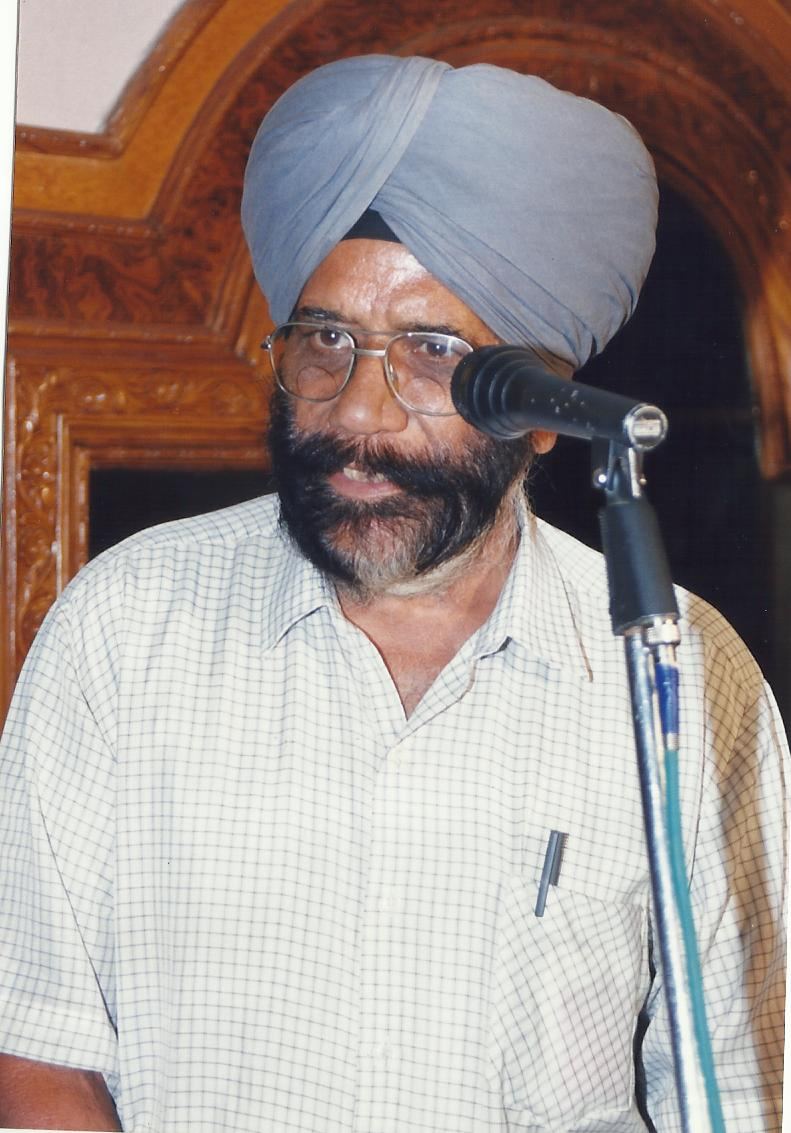
- Panjabi songwriter

Background information
- Also known as: Inderjit Singh Hasanpuri
- Born: Inderjit Singh Kharal; 20 August 1932; Akalgarh village, (now Ludhiana district) British Punjab
- Origin: Hasanpur, Ludhiana district, Punjab, India
- Died: 8 October 2009 (aged 77) Ludhiana, Punjab
- Genres: Folk, Duets
- Occupations: Songwriter/Lyricist, Producer, Writer

Inderjit Hasanpuri also spelled as Inderjeet Hassanpuri and born as Inderjit Singh Kharal, was a well known songwriter/lyricist, producer, and writer from Punjab, India. He died on 8 October 2009 at Ludhiana.

== Early life ==
Hasanpuri was born as Inderjit Singh Kharal on 20 August 1932, to father Jaswant Singh Kharal and mother Bhagwan Kaur, in the village of Akalgarh (his mother's village), Ludhiana district, Indian Punjab.

He started His career as Painter, he had his shop next to Naulakha Cinema in Ludhiana. and used write poetry and songs as his passion from his childhood, One of his first song was sung by Chandi Ram.

== Career ==
=== Producer ===
He Produced his first Movie Teri Meri Ik Jindri and gave the break to Virender, the cousin of Dharmender and Ajit Singh Deol, He also Cast Mehar Mittal as newcomer. His movie Dahej (Hindi) was remake of his own Punjabi movie DAAJ

Teri Meri Ik Jindri

Daaj

Sukhi Parivar

Dahej

Sada Pind, Telefilm

=== Lyricist ===
Hassanpuri has written famous songs like 'Kurti mulmul di, dhai din na jawani rehndi' sung by ghazal singer Jagjit Singh while his wife, Chitra, gave her voice to Hassanpuri's song 'charkha mera rangla, vich sone dian mekhan, ne mein teno yaad karan, jad charkhe nu dekhan'. Charre Waqt ko Pade by K Deep, Jeh Tu Meri Tor Vekhni.

He also penned the lyrics of song Main vi jatt ludhiane da sung by Late Surinder Kaur and Harcharan Garewal.

He is the only one who wrote QAWALLI in Punjabi in the movie Man Jeete Jag Jeet

Man Jeete Jag Jeet

Dukh Bhanjan Tera Naam

Teri Meri Ik Jindri

Pappi Tere Anek

Fauji Chacha

Choran Nu More

Jai Mata Di

Long da lishkara

Sangram

Waqt ke Shehzade

Parchhaven, TV Serial
