= Seema Kapoor =

Indian filmmaker and writer

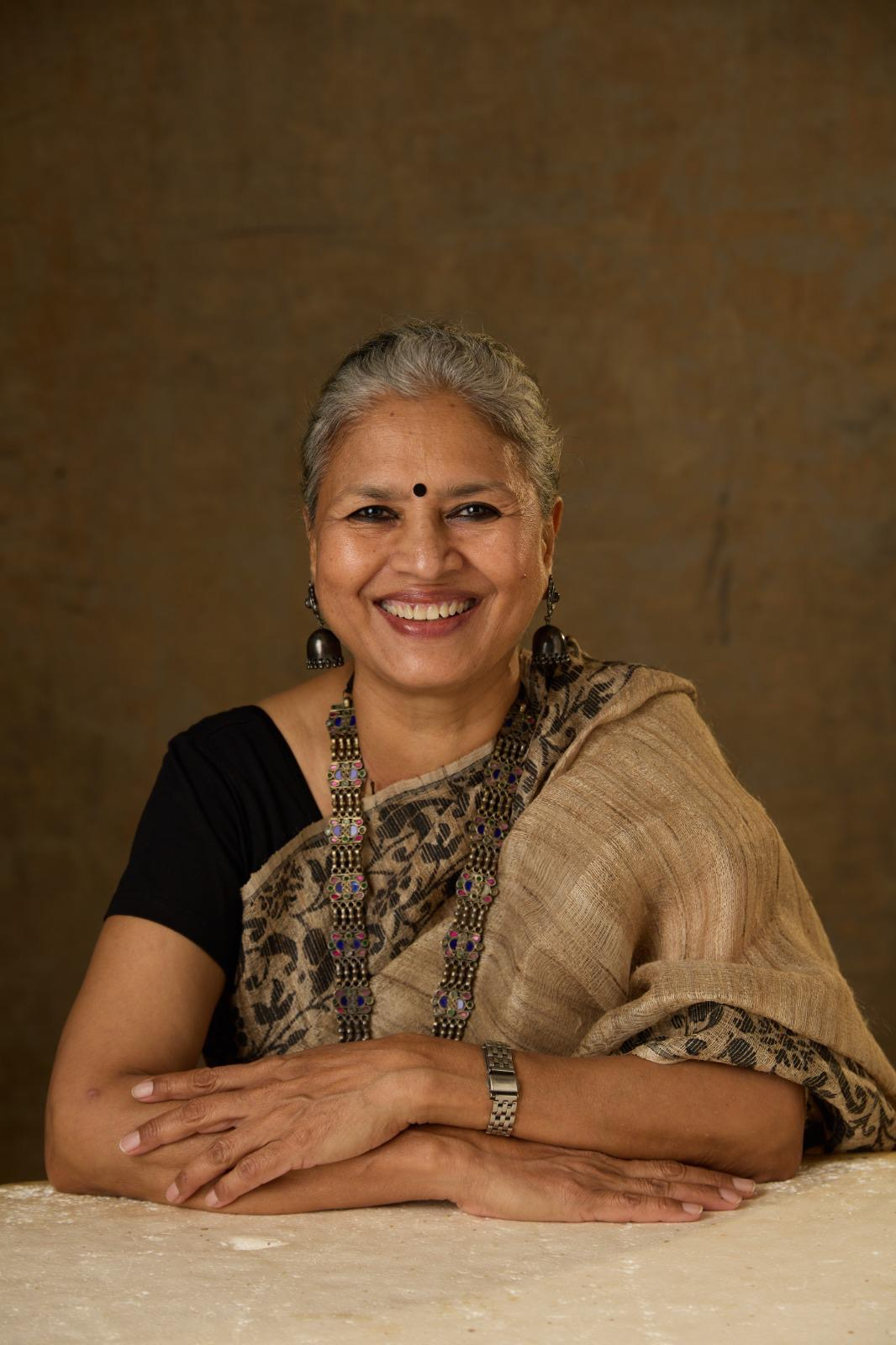
- Occupations: Writer, Director, Producer
- Years active: 1987–present
- Television: Avantika
- Spouse: Om Puri (m. 1990; div. 1993)
- Website: https://seemakapoor.in/

Seema Kapoor is an Indian filmmaker and writer known for her contributions to cinema and television. She is the sister of director and playwright Ranjit Kapoor, actor and television personality Annu Kapoor, and filmmaker Nikhil Kapoor.

== Early life and family ==
Kapoor was born into a family associated with theatre and the arts. Her father, Madanlal Kapoor, was associated with Parsi theatre in India. Her mother, Kamal Shabnam Kapoor, was an Urdu poet and classical singer.

== Career ==
Seema Kapoor began her career in puppet theatre at the Shri Ram Centre for Performing Arts, Delhi. In collaboration with the Indian Council for Cultural Relations (ICCR), she participated in international puppet festivals representing India.

She entered television in 1988 with the serial Qile Ka Rahasya and subsequently worked on television productions and documentaries for government ministries. She wrote the screenplay and dialogues for the film Abhay (1994), which received the National Film Award for Best Children's Film in 1995.

In 2010, Kapoor wrote and directed Haat – The Weekly Bazaar, produced by the National Film Development Corporation of India (NFDC). The film received the Critics' Award for Best Director at the Third Eye Asian Film Festival and the Best Story–Screenplay award at the Jagran Film Festival. It was screened at film festivals including the International Film Festival of India, Mumbai Film Festival, Cairo International Film Festival, Tongues on Fire (London), and The Hidden Gems (Canada).

In 2017, she wrote and directed the feature film Mr. Kabadi, produced by Anup Jalota. a satirical comedy featuring her late ex-husband, actor Om Puri. The film was among Puri's final works.

In 2024, she directed Avantika, a historical TV serial that aired on Doordarshan.

=== Language coaching and mentoring ===
Kapoor has also worked as a language and diction coach for actors, including Janhvi Kapoor.

== Filmography ==
=== Films ===
Year	Title	Producer	Director	Writer	Notes
1994	Abhay	—	—		Dialogues and screenplay
1999	Kahani Kismat Ki	—	—	Yes	
2011	Haat - The Weekly Bazaar		Yes	Yes	
2017	Mr Kabaadi		Yes	Yes	

=== Television ===
Year	Title	Network	Producer	Director	Writer	Notes
1987–88	Qile Ka Rahasya	DD National	Yes	Yes	Yes	
1991	Babu Ji Ka Circus	DD National	Yes	Yes	Yes	
1998–99	Vijay Jyoti	Zee TV	—	—	Yes	
1999	Knock Knock! Kaun Hai?	Zee TV	—	—	Yes	
1999	Pal Chhin	Star TV	—	—	Yes	
1999	Ittefaq	Zee TV	Yes	Yes	Yes	
1999	Yun Hi Chhu Liya Kisi Ne	DD National	Yes	Yes	Yes	
2001	Zindgi Nama	UTN (Zee Network)	Yes	Yes	Yes	
2001	Indian Classic Stories	DD National	—	—	Yes	
2002	Faslay	Geo TV	Yes	Yes	Yes	
2003–04	Hawayein	Zee TV	—	—	Yes	
2009	Uttar Katha	DD National	—	Yes	—	
2015	Mera Gaon Mera Desh	DD National	Yes	Yes	Yes	
2019	Eklavya	DD National	Yes	Yes	Yes	
2024	Avantika	DD National	Yes	Yes	Yes	

== Autobiography ==
In March 2025, Kapoor released her autobiography Yun Guzri Hai Ab Talak at a launch event attended by film personalities including Boney Kapoor, Annu Kapoor, Anupam Kher, Paresh Rawal, Raghubir Yadav, Divya Dutta, Bharti Lavekar and Jaspinder Narula.

The book was featured by Sahitya Aaj Tak among notable autobiographical works of 2025.

== Personal life ==
Kapoor was married to Om Puri from 1990 to 1993. The couple later separated. In interviews, Kapoor has stated that the separation occurred during her pregnancy and that she subsequently lost the child.

In the later years of his life, Puri re-established contact with Kapoor, and they remained on cordial terms until his death in 2017.
