= Kuldeep Manak =

Indian singer (1951–2011)

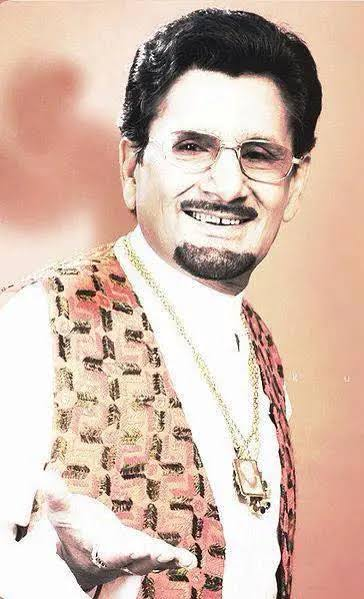

Background information
- Also known as: Manak Singh
- Born: 15 November 1951; Jalal, Bathinda, Punjab, India
- Died: 30 November 2011 (aged 60) Ludhiana, Punjab, India
- Genres: Folk, kali
- Occupations: Singer, actor, musician, composer
- Instrument: Tumbi
- Years active: 1968–2011
- Labels: His Master's Voice, T-Series

Kuldeep Manak (born Latif Mohammed Khan; 15 November 1951 – 30 November 2011), was an Indian singer best known for singing a rare genre of Punjabi music, kali, also known by its plural form kalian or kaliyan. Manak is generally regarded as one of the greatest Punjabi artists of all time. His high pitched strong voice was unique, and instantly recognisable. A statue of Manak has been erected in Ludhiana near his residence as a tribute.

== Early life ==
Manak was born as Latif Mohammed on 15 November 1951 to Nikka Khan in Mirasi family, in the village of Jalal in Bathinda district of Indian Punjab. Sardar Partap Singh Kairon (then Chief Minister of Punjab) penned the name Kuldip Manak, after being amazed by the quality of his voice at a school prize giving. He completed his education from Jalal Government High School, where he was a keen hockey player. He had an inclination towards singing from an extremely young age. He was constantly persuaded by his ustad to graft in his raags and perform on stage. In his early career he became the baadshah of kaliyan. He had lyrics written by famous writers such as Debi Maksoospuri, Dev Tharikewala and Jandu Litranwala. His most known tracks were Gadeya Millade Sohne Yaar, Yusuf Zuleikha, Tere Tille ton and Dulleya Ve Tokra. Manak learnt the hazuri raagi methods of gaiki.

== Family ==
Manak's father, Nikka Khan, was a singer himself. Manak had two brothers: Siddqui, a devotional singer, and Rafiq, who was also briefly noted. Kuldeep Manak's ancestors were the Hazoori Raagis (designated cantors) of Kirtan for Maharaja Hira Singh of Nabha.

He was married to Sarabjeet Kaur with whom he had two children, a boy named Yudhvir Manak and a girl named Shakti Manak. Yudhvir is following in his father's footsteps as a singer.

== Career ==
Manak learned music under Ustad Khushi Muhammad Qawwal in village Bhuttiwala at Muktsar. He left Bathinda and went to Ludhiana to pursue his career as a singer and started singing with the duo Harcharan Grewal and Seema.

When they came to Delhi, a music company official spotted Manak and asked him to record the song "jija akhian na maar ve main kall di kurhi" (written by Babu Singh Maan Mararawala) with Seema. In 1968, at the age of 17, he was given the chance to record the song with Seema. His first record features this song along with "laung karaa mittra, machhli paunge maape" (written by Gurdev Singh Maan). This record was a runaway success. He did sing duets with Satinder Kaur biba, younger sister of famous Punjabi singer Narinder biba; one of the duets was "Nale baba lasee pee gia nale de gia duanee khotee".

Later, he started an office at Bathinda along with writer Dilip Singh Sidhu of Kanakwal, but did not stay there for long and returned to Ludhiana. The first folk song sung by Manak was "maa Mirze di boldi", followed by "ohne maut nu waajan maarian".

The writer and lyricist, Hardev Dilgir (also known as Dev Tharikewala) spotted Manak at one of his live performances and penned many Lok Gathavan (English: old folk stories) for him. Dev Tharikewala and Manak were very close to each other.

His first EP, Punjab Dian Lok Gathawan, was released by His Master's Voice in 1973 which included the songs "Jaimal Phatta", "Heer Di Kali" (Teri Khatar Heere) (kali), "Raja Rasalu" and "Dulla Bhatti" (Dulleya ve tokra chukayeen aanke). All were written by Hardev Dilgir and the music was composed by Ram Saran Das.

This was followed by another Lok Gathawan album in 1974 which included "Gorakh da Tilla" and "Allah Bismillah teri Jugni". In 1976 his first LP, Ik Tara, was released, which included the kali "Tere Tille Ton", "Chheti Kar Sarwan Bachcha" and "Garh Mughlane Dian Naaran" and more.

Other albums included:

- Mitran di jacket de (1973)
- Heer di doli (1977)
- Sahiban Bani Bharaawan Di (1978)
- Sahiban Da Tarla (1979)
- Maa Hundhi Ae Maa (1980)
- Akhan ch Najaiz Vikdi (1980)
- Ichhran Dhaahan Maardi (1981)
- Mehroo Posti (1982)
- Sarwan Bhagat (1983)
- Jugni Yaaran Di (1983)
- Mundri vagah ke maari (1984)
- Bhul Jaan Waaliye (1984)
- Nachna pia (1985)
- Ja ni tera kakh na rahe
- Ranjha heer di bukal
- Heer maardi leraan
- Dilla De Sodya
- Baba lassi peegeya
- Kadna rumaalde geya ve
- Sanu nachke vikha
- Singh Soorme (1978) including Banda Singh Bahadur
- Ghare chal kadun rarkan
- Dil milyan de mele
- Karo na yaar maar mitro
- Dil nahion lagda
- Ghadney Jhande Khalsa Raaj (1991)
- Gidhe wich too nachdi
- Yaar ve teri yaari
- Loko vaddeya gandasseyan de naal
- Laila Laila mukh ton Majnu
- Hakaan maardi
- The One
- Bhull ke jhuthe yaaran nu
- Ranjha jogi hoya
- Do Gabhru Punjab De

Manak's voice was versatile as within one album he sang in many different pitches and tones to reflect a song's meaning. For example, on the album Sahiban da Tarla the songs "Sahiban da Tarla", "Yaari Yaaran di" and "Teri aan ma Teri Ranjha" are all sung with different pitches.

== Film ==
He also acted and sang in many Punjabi films such as Saidan Jogan (1979) with the song "sathon naee majhin chaar hundian", and Lambardaarni (1980) with "yaaran da truck balliye". In Balbiro Bhabi (1981) he was actor, singer and composer. He sang "ajj dhee ik raje di", in the 1983 film Sassi Punnu.

== Politics ==
Manak took part in the parliament elections of 1996 as an independent member from Bathinda, but did not win.

== Illness and death ==
Manak was admitted to emergency care in July 2011 due to lower gastrointestinal bleeding. While he was discharged from emergency care when his condition stabilized, his son was still admitted in DMC ludhiana undergoing treatment for a mental illness due to which Manak suffered a tremendous amount of stress.

Manak was later admitted to DMC Ludhiana due pneumonia on 28 November 2011 and he died on 30 November due to complications.

He was buried in his native village, Jalal at Bathinda (Punjab)on 2 December 2011.

== In popular culture ==
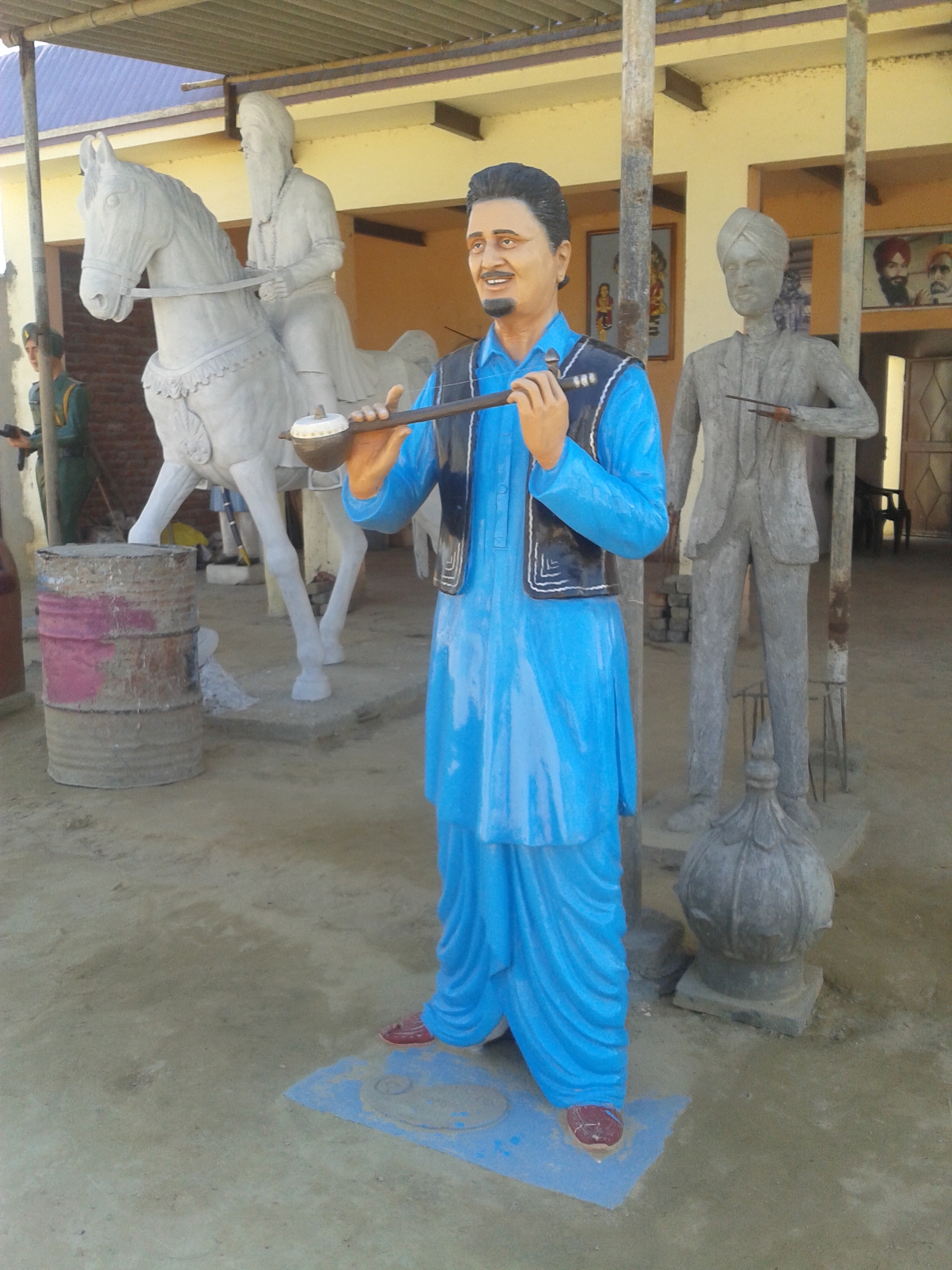
Statue of Kuldeep Manak being prepared at Gurdwara Mehdiana Sahib

On 25 December 2012, a tribute single was released by Aman Hayer under Moviebox Records with the title "The Folk King" (subtitled "Ustaad Kuldeep Manak Ji Tribute"), featuring a number of artists interpreting his songs. The track was first played and performed at the Britasia Music Awards 2012 by Angrej Ali who started the song with "Vaar Banda Bahadur", with which Ustaad Kuldeep Manak Ji used to start his shows. The final song sung in this tribute was "Tere Tille Ton" by Jazzy B, a close student of Ustaad Kuldeep Manak Ji.

Manak's songs were featured in the movie Punjab 1984 starring Diljit Dosanjh and Pavan Malhotra as a tribute to him. The main character, Shivjeet, is an avid fan of Manak and his songs are played at suspenseful moments of the film.

== See also ==
- Dev Tharikewala
- Surinder Kaur
- Didar Sandhu
- Asa Singh Mastana
- List of Punjabi singers
- Punjabi folk music
- Alam Lohar
