= Veerendra =

Indian film actor, director, producer, and writer (1948-1988)

- Born: Subhash Dhadwal; 15 August 1948; Phagwara, Punjab, India
- Died: 6 December 1988 (aged 40); Talwandi Kalan, Punjab, India
- Occupations: Actor, Writer, Producer, Director
- Spouse: Pammi Veerendra
- Children: 2
- Relatives: Dharmendra (cousin); Deepti Bhatnagar (daughter-in-law); Chandana Sharma (daughter-in-law)

Veerendra, born Subhash Dhadwal, (1948–1988) was an Indian film actor, director, producer and writer who made 25 Punjabi-language films in his 12-year career.

He made his debut with the film Teri Meri Ek Jindri, released in 1975, featuring Dharmendra, his cousin.

He was a regular in Punjabi films of the 1980s, often considered its leading hero till his death in 1988, in a murder which remains unsolved. Some of his more popular films were Lambhardarni, Balbiro Bhabhi and Dushmani Dee Agg, which was released after his death.

== Personal life ==
According to The Times of India, Veerendra's real name was Subhash Dhadwal. He was born in Phagwara. His father was Gurdas Ram, a noted 'Hakeem' (a physicist) in Phagwara. Dharmendra was his maternal cousin, as he was the son of his mother's brother. He was shot to death in 1988 and was survived by his wife Pammi and two sons, Randeep and Ramandeep Arya.

Both sons have been active in the entertainment industry: Randeep became a television producer after a short acting career, and is married to actress Deepti Bhatnagar; Ramandeep has served as assistant director to the likes of Sanjay Gupta and Rajiv Rai and is married to actress Chandana Sharma.

== Filmography ==
- Dushmani Dee Aag (1990) ... Jeeta
- Jatt Soormay (1988) ... Jeeta
- Patola (1988) ... Balwant 'Ballu'
- Jatt Te Zameen (1987) ... Jeeta
- Mera Lahoo (1987) Hindi movie as a director
- Vairi Jatt (1985) ... Veer
- Guddo (1985)
- Tulsi (1985) Hindi movie as a director
- Ranjhan Mera Yaar (1984)
- Nimmo (1984) ... Karma
- Jigri Yaar (1984) ... Karma
- Yarri Jatt Di (1984) ... Jeeta
- Laajo (1983) ... Jeeta
- Ajj Di Heer (1983)
- Siskiyan (1983)
- Sardara Kartara (1981) ... Kartara
- Batwara (1982) ... Karma
- Rano (1982) ... Mohna
- Sarpanch (1982) ... Karma
- Balbeero Bhabi (1981) .... Succha
- Khel Muqaddar Ka (1981)
- Lambardarni (1980)...Karma (Movie dubbed in Hindi under the title Khel Muqaddar Ka)
- Kunwara Mama (1979)
- Saida Jogan (1979)
- Jindri Yaar Di (1978)
- Giddha (1978) Doctor Balveer
- Zehreeli (1977)
- Do Chehere (1977) Hindi film as a Raj
- Santo Banto (1976).... Jeeta
- Sawa Lakh Se Ek Ladaun (1976) ... Gafoor Khan
- Takkra (1976)
- Dharam Jeet (1975)
- Teri Meri Ik Jindri (1975) .... Jeeta
- Insan Aur Insan (1973) ...
