= Satish Kaul =

Indian actor (1946–2021)

- Born: 8 September 1946; Srinagar, Jammu and Kashmir, British India
- Died: 10 April 2021 (aged 74); Ludhiana, Punjab, India
- Occupations: Actor, Producer

Satish Kaul (8 September 1946 – 10 April 2021) was an Indian actor in both Punjabi and Hindi movies. He acted in over 300 Hindi and Punjabi films and worked with Bollywood actors such as Dev Anand, Dilip Kumar and Shahrukh Khan amongst others. His notable film roles included ones in Sassi Punnu, Ishq Nimana, Prem Parbat, Suhag Chooda and Patola.

Kaul won the "lifetime achievement" award for his contribution to Punjabi cinema at PTC Punjabi Film Awards 2011. He was regarded as one of the most successful regional film actors of all time. He was referred to as the "Amitabh Bachchan of Punjabi cinema".

Kaul died of COVID-19 on 10 April 2021.

== Personal life ==
Later in his life, Kaul settled down in Ludhiana and started an acting school there, which lost money. His wife, who was pregnant, had separated from him to go to South Africa in 1982.

== Career ==
Kaul was first noticed as the romantic lead opposite Rehana Sultan in Ved Rahi's Prem Parbat (1973). He played the lead in a bunch of Hindi films such as Mere Satraj (1975) and Harfan Maula (1976). He also played character roles in many films including Dev Anand's Warrant (1975) and Subhash Ghai's Karma (1986).

== Filmography ==
=== Hindi ===
- Pyaar To Hona Hi Tha (1998)
- Aunty No. 1 (1998)
- Zanjeer (1998)
- Yaraana (1995) as Inspector
- Janam Kundli (1995) as Rajiv Sodhi
- Inteqam Ke Sholay (1995)
- Elaan (1994) as Vikas Chaudhry
- Pyar Hua Chori Chori (1991) as Jailor
- Khel (1992) as Vinod Mishra
- Bandh Darwaza (1990)
- Ram Lakhan (1989)
- Bijli Aur Toofan (1988)
- Paanch Fauladi (1988)
- Padosi Ki Biwi (1988)…as Satish
- Janam Janam (1988) as Prakash
- Kabrastan (1988) as Inspector
- Commando (1988) as Satish - Chander's dad
- Hatya (1988) as Mohan
- Pyaar Ka Mandir (1988) as Satish
- Mardon Wali Baat (1988) as Inspector Deepak
- Khooni Mahal (1987)
- Dance Dance (1987) as Shyam
- Aag Hi Aag (1987) as Birju
- Inaam Dus Hazaar (1987) as Vikram Malhotra
- Karma (1986) as Sunil
- Ilzaam (1986) as Rahim Khan
- Bhulekha (1986) as a Deepak in Punjabi Movie
- Anokha Modh (1985) as Mr. Ashok
- Shiva Ka Insaaf (1985) as Prakashnath
- Nek Parveen (1982) as Akter
- Sheetla Mata (1981) as Sarju
- Garam Khoon (1980) as Inspector
- Premi Gangaram (1978) as Satish
- Bhakti Mein Shakti (1978) as Satish
- Harfan Maula (1976) as Mahesh
- Kasam (1976)
- Warrant (1975) as Dinesh
- Mere Sartaj (1975) as Javed Ahmed Gulrez
- Ang Se Ang Lagaley (1974)
- Dawat (1974)
- Faslah (1974) as Satish - Gautam's friend
- Prem Parbat (1973)

=== Punjabi ===
- Aazaadi: The Freedom (2015)
- Proud to Be a Sikh (2014)
- Fer Mamla Gadbad Gadbad (2013)
- Saunh Menu Punjab Di (1991)
- Sheran De Putt Sher (1990)
- Jag Wala Mela (1988)
- Suhag Chooda (1988)
- Dhee Rani (1988)
- Maula Jatt (1988)
- Patola (1987) as Amar
- Yaar Gareeban Da (1986)
- Bhulekha (1986) as a Deepak
- Peengan Pyar Deeyan (1986)
- Babul Da Vehra (1985)
- Guddo (1985)
- Jeeja Sali (1985)
- Kunwara Jeeja (1985)
- Munda Naram Te Kudi Garam (1985)
- Maanwaan Thandian Chaanwan (1984)
- Veera (1984)
- Sassi Punnu (1983)
- Bhulekha (1983)
- Bagga Daku (1983) as Bagga Daku
- Jai Mata Chintpurni (1983)
- Vohti Hath Soti (1983)
- " Vehda Lambra Da" ( 1982)
- Angerjjan (1982)
- Chhammak Chhallo (1982)
- Jatt Da Gandasa (1982)
- Yaar Yaaran De (1982)
- Rano (1982)
- Do Posti (1981) (guest appearance)
- Josh Jawani Da (1981)
- Lachhi (1981)
- Josh Jawani Da (1981)
- Jai Baba Balak Nath (1981)
- Ishq Nimana (1980) as Jeeta
- Gori Diyan Jhanjran (1980)
- " Dhyanu Bhagat( 1978)
- Jatt Punjabi (1979)
- Mutiyaar (1979)
- Dera Aashiqan Da (1979)

=== TV Series ===
- Mahabharata TV series ( 1988 ) Indradev
- Vikram Aur Betaal
- The Realization of Prince Anandsen (1988) as Yuvraj Anandsen
- The Love Story of Four Princes (1988) as Prince Ajay
- Love Is Eternal (1988) as Madhusudan
- Whom Will the Princess Marry? (1988) as The Vaid
- The Husband, the Thief, and the Lover (1988) as The Lover
- King Chandrasen and His Servant Satvasheel (1988) as Satvasheel
- Three Suitors and Somprabha (1988) as Shilpi
- The Story of Padmavati and Prince Vajramukti (1988) as Prince Vajramukti
- Love Story of King Yashodhan (1988) as Senapati
- King Vikramaditya and the Yogi/Suryamal and His Bride's Dilemma (1988) as Suryamal
- Dada Dadi Ki Kahaniyan (1986) as Madan Kumar

== Awards ==
- Lifetime achievement award at PTC Punjabi Film Awards 2011
