= Mehar Mittal =

Indian actor (1934–2016)

- Born: 20 September 1934; Gidderbaha, Punjab, India
- Died: 22 October 2016 (aged 82)
- Occupations: Actor, producer

Mehar Mittal (born Mehar Chand; 24 October 1934 – 22 October 2016) was an Indian actor. He is known for playing comic roles in Punjabi Cinema. He is known as the King of Punjabi Comedies. No movie was complete without his being a part of it during his peak time. The audience would look forward to his entry in movies with applause. His comedy could make the audience laugh. To this day his dialogue is remembered. Playback singers like Mohd Rafi and Mahendra Kapoor recorded many songs for Mehar Mittal besides singing for the hero of the same film. He is the only Producer who brought Amitabh Bachchan, Vinod Khanna, Tanuja, Reena Roy into Punjabi films.

== Filmography (Punjabi) ==
- Mar Jawan Gur Khake(2010)
- Qahar (1998) - Doctor
- Dukh Pardesaan De (1997)
- Lambardaar (1995)
- Teri Jyot Jale Din Raat (1995)
- Kachehri (1994)
- Masti (1994) aa
- Nasibo (1994)
- Kudi Canada Di (1993)
- Jatt Walaity (1992)
- Jorr Jatt Da (1991) ...Ruldu
- Diva Bale Sari Raat (1991)
- Qurbani Jatt Di (1990)
- Sheran De Putt Sher (1990)
- Sounh Menoo Punjab Di (1990)
- Anakh Jattan De (1990)
- Dushmani Dee Agg (1990)
- Tera Mera Pyar (1990)
- Bhabo (1989)
- Watno Dur (1989)
- Suhag Chooda (1988)
- Hum To Chale Pardes (1988)
- Jatt Soormay (1988)
- Jatt Te Zameen (1987)
- Peengan Pyar Deeyan (1986)
- Bulekha (1986)
- Long Da Lishkara (1986) - Rurhiya Kubba
- Peengan Pyar Deeyan (1986)
- Jeeja Sali (1985)
- Maujaan Dubai Diyaan (1985)
- Duja Viah (1984)
- Mamla Garbar Hai (1984)
- Nimmo (1984)
- Yaari Jatt Di (1984)
- Ranjhan Mera Yaar (1984)
- Sohni Mahiwal (1984)
- Babul Da Vehra (1983)
- Laung Da Lishkara (1983)
- Do Madari (1983) - Madari
- Laajo (1983)
- Unkhili Muttiar (1983)
- Putt Jattan De (1983) - Baalam Pardesi
- Vehra Lambran Da ( 1982)-Jagtu ( Jagta)
- Gopichand Jasoos (1982) - Friendly appearance
- Meharbaani (1982)
- Sarpanch (1982)
- Aasra pyar da (1982)
- Ucha Dar Babe Nanak Da (1982) - Sakhi Ram (Dakhiaa)
- Balbeero Bhabi (1981)
- Vilayati Babu (1981) he Produced that movie also
- Jatti ( 1980)
- Chann Pardesi (1980)
- Ishq Nimana (1980) ...Nathu Ram
- Fauji Chacha (1980)
- Sardara Kartara (1980)
- Jatt Punjabi (1979)
- Kunwara Mama (1979) - Kunwara Mama
- Sukhi Pariwar (1979)
- Til Til Dalekha (1979)
- Udeekan (1978)
- Jindri Yar Di (1978)
- Shaheed Kartar Singh Sarabha (1977)
- Daaj (1976)
- Giddha (1976)
- Lambhardarni (1976)
- Main Papi Tum Bakhshanhaar (1976) - Pandit
- Santo Banto (1976)
- Sawa Lakh Se Ek Ladaun (1976)
- Taakra (1976)
- Yamla Jatt (1976)
- Teri Meri Ik Jindri (1975) - Hansu (Hai-ka-na)
- Do Sher (1974)
- Sacha Mera Roop Hai (1974)
- Sherni (1973)
- Tere Rang Nyare (1973)
- Maa Da Laadla (1969)

== Filmography (Bollywood) ==
- Maa Santoshi Maa (2003)
- Tum Karo Vaada (1993) - Veer (Waiter)
- Dada Dadi Ki Kahaniyan in EP 8 & 11 For Sagar Films
- Hum To Chale Pardes (1988)
- Sohni Mhaiwal (1984)
- Jeene Nahi Dunga (1984)
- Patwari (1983)
- Gopichand Jasoos (1982)-Tali Ram Hoshiarpuri
- Walayati Babu (1981) - Vilayti Ram
- Badmashon Ka Badmaash (1979)
- Pratigya (1975)
- Anooka (1975)
