= List of Punjabi singers =

This is an alphabetical list of notable Punjabi singers. These vocal artists are from the Indian and Pakistani state of Punjab; some belong to the immigrant population living abroad in the United Kingdom, North America and Africa.

== A ==
- Abrar-ul-Haq
- Abida Parveen
- Attaullah Khan Esakhelvi
- Asa Singh Mastana
- Amar Singh Chamkila
- Ali Zafar
- Atif Aslam
- Amanat Ali
- Amrinder Gill
- Akhil
- Allah Ditta Loonay Wala
- Angrej Ali
- Anmol Gagan Maan
- Aman Hayer
- Alam Lohar
- AP Dhillon
- AR Paisley
- Arif Lohar
- Arjan Dhillon
- Ahmed Rushdi
- Abida Parveen
- Azra Jehan
- Amrit Maan
- Ammy Virk
- Amar Arshi
- Amar Noorie

== B ==
- Babbu Maan
- Bhagwant Maan
- Bally Sagoo
- Bohemia
- Benjamin Sisters
- Baljit Malwa
- Balkar Sidhu
- Babbal Rai
- Baba Sehgal
- Bikram Singh
- Bilal Saeed
- B Praak

== C ==
- Channi Singh

== D ==
- Daler Mehndi
- Dilshad Akhtar
- Diljit Dosanjh
- Didar Sandhu
- Dr Zeus
- Dharampreet
- Durga Rangila

== F ==
- Fariha Pervez
- Farida Khanum
- Fateh Doe

== G ==
- Gurdas Maan
- Gurmeet Bawa
- Gurnam Bhullar
- Ghulam Ali
- Gippy Grewal
- Gurshabad
- Guru Randhawa
- Garry Sandhu
- Gur Sidhu
- Gurinder Gill

== H ==
- Harbhajan Maan
- Hadiqa Kiani
- Hardy Sandhu
- Honey Singh
- Happy Raikoti
- H-Dhami
- Hans Raj Hans
- Harjit Harman
- Harshdeep Kaur
- Himanshi
- Humaira Channa
- Hakam Sufi

== I ==
- Inayat Hussain Bhatti
- Imran Khan
- Inderjit Nikku

== J ==
- Jagmohan Kaur
- Jasbir Jassi
- Jasmine Sandlas
- Jaswinder Brar
- Jass Bajwa
- Jass Manak
- Jassa Dhillon
- Jawad Ahmad
- Jaz Dhami
- Jazzy B
- Juggy D
- Jassie Gill
- Jagjit Singh
- Jay Sean
- Jaspinder Narula
- Jassi Sidhu
- Jordan Sandhu

== K ==
- Kaka
- Kamal Heer
- Kanth Kaler
- Kamal Khan
- Kuldeep Manak
- Kulwinder Dhillon
- Karamjit Anmol
- Karan Aujla
- Kanika Kapoor
- Kiran Ahluwalia
- Karnail Gill
- K S Makhan
- Kamaljit Neeru
- Karnail Singh Paras
- Kulwinder Billa

== L ==
- Labh Janjua
- Lakhwinder Wadali
- Lehmber Hussainpuri
- Lal Chand Yamla Jatt

== M ==
- Mansoor Malangi
- Manni Sandhu
- Mohammad Rafi
- Mohammad Sadiq
- Manmohan Waris
- Mehdi Hassan
- Mala
- Mehnaz
- Miss Pooja
- Mannat Noor
- Master Saleem
- Malkit Singh
- Mickey Singh
- Masood Rana
- Musarrat Nazir
- Maninder Buttar

== N ==
- Nusrat Fateh Ali Khan
- Noor Jehan
- Naseebo Lal
- Naheed Akhtar
- Nimrat Khaira
- Nachhatar Gill
- Narinder Biba
- Nav
- Navv Inder
- Naseem Begum
- Ninja
- Nisha Bano
- Nachhatar Chhatta

== P ==
- Pammi Bai
- Panjabi MC
- Parmish Verma
- Preet Brar
- Prem Dhillon
- Preet Harpal

== R ==
- Raj Brar
- Ranjit Bawa
- Ranjit Kaur
- Rahat Fateh Ali Khan
- Roshan Prince
- Reshma
- Ravinder Grewal

== S ==
- Satinder Sartaaj
- Sunanda Sharma
- Surinder Kaur
- Surjit Bindrakhia
- Sangtar
- Satwinder Bitti
- Sahir Ali Bagga
- Sajjad Ali
- Surj Sahota
- Sarbjit Cheema
- Shaukat Ali
- Surjit Khan
- Shazia Manzoor
- Satinder Satti
- Sukshinder Shinda
- Saleem Raza
- Surinder Shinda
- Sardool Sikander
- Shanno Khurana
- Sukhwinder Singh
- Sukhbir
- Saieen Zahoor
- Sharry Maan
- Sidhu Moosewala
- Shubh
- Shinda Kahlon

== T ==
- Tarsem Jassar
- Tarsame Singh Saini
- Tegi Pannu
- Tesher
- The PropheC
- Tufail Niazi

== V ==
- Veronica Mehta

== Y ==
- Yo Yo Honey Singh
- Yuvraj Hans

== Z ==
- Zubaida Khanum
