= Dhurandhar (soundtrack) =

2025 soundtrack album by Shashwat Sachdev

- Soundtrack album cover

Soundtrack album by Shashwat Sachdev
- Released: 1 December 2025 (standard); 10 December 2025 (extended)
- Recorded: 2024–2025
- Genre: Feature film soundtrack
- Length: 21:56 (standard); 38:54 (extended)
- Languages: Hindi; Punjabi; English
- Label: Saregama
- Producer: Shashwat Sachdev

Shashwat Sachdev chronology
Kesari Chapter 2 (2025)	Dhurandhar (2025)	Dhurandhar: The Revenge (2026)
External audio
- Dhurandhar — Full Album on YouTube
- Dhurandhar – Extended Album on YouTube

Singles from Dhurandhar
- 1. "Dhurandhar (Title Track)" Released: 15 October 2025; 2. "Ishq Jalakar (Karvaan)" Released: 25 November 2025; 3. "Gehra Hua" Released: 27 November 2025

Dhurandhar is the soundtrack album to the 2025 film of the same name written and directed by Aditya Dhar and produced by Aditya Dhar, Lokesh Dhar and Jyoti Deshpande under Jio Studios and B62 Studios. The film stars Ranveer Singh, Akshaye Khanna, R. Madhavan, Sanjay Dutt, Arjun Rampal, Rakesh Bedi and Sara Arjun. The soundtrack consisted of six songs, three of them being previously released as singles, composed by Shashwat Sachdev, with lyrics written by Irshad Kamil. The soundtrack was released through Saregama on 1 December 2025, coinciding with the film's audio launch event held in Mumbai. The extended album with five additional songs was released on 10 December 2025.

The soundtrack emerged as the first Bollywood film soundtrack to have every track chart simultaneously within the Spotify Global Top 200.

== Development ==
In July 2025, it was announced that Shashwat Sachdev would compose the soundtrack and film score, marking his second collaboration with Aditya Dhar following Uri: The Surgical Strike (2019). The music rights were acquired by Saregama.

The soundtrack notably features several retro classic Hindi songs remixed and sampled with a modern touch.

== Release ==
The title track was released on 15 October 2025. Featuring vocals by Hanumankind and Jasmine Sandlas, it sampled the 1995 Punjabi song "Na Dil De Pardesi Nu" by Muhammad Sadiq and Ranjit Kaur as well as the 2003 remixed version "Jogi" by Panjabi MC. The second single titled "Ishq Jalakar – Karvaan" was released on 25 November 2025, ahead of its schedule due to high public demand owing to the song being featured in the film's trailer. The song was a remake of the Hindi-Urdu qawwali (with intermittent Punjabi lines) “Na To Caravan Ki Talash Hai” from Barsaat Ki Raat (1960), sung by Manna Dey, Asha Bhosle, Sudha Malhotra, S. D. Batish, and Mohammed Rafi. Another song "Yeh Hai Ishq Ishq" from the same film Barsaat Ki Raat was also remixed as "Move – Yeh Ishq Ishq" and featured vocals by Reble and Sonu Nigam. The trailer and film version of "Move – Yeh Ishq Ishq" also featured vocals from the rapper Tsumyoki. Notably, both “Ishq Jalakar – Karvaan” and “Move – Yeh Ishq Ishq” trace their origins to the famous 1950s Sufi qawwali "Na To Butkade Ki Talab Mujhe", which was written by Ameer Bakhsh Sabri and composed and performed by the brothers Fateh Ali Khan and Mubarak Ali Khan. "Na To Butkade Ki Talab Mujhe" was the original qawwali that inspired "Na To Caravan Ki Talash Hai" and “Yeh Hai Ishq Ishq” in Barsaat Ki Raat.

The third single "Gehra Hua", sung by Arijit Singh; was released in audio format on 27 November 2025. The full video was released a day later on 28 November 2025, featuring vocals by Arijit Singh and the on-screen romance between Ranveer Singh and Sara Arjun. The song "Run Down The City – Monica" was a remake of the song "Piya Tu Ab To Aja" from Caravan (1971). The fifth single "Shararat", an item number, featured vocals by Madhubanti Bagchi and Jasmine Sandlas, with Krystle D'Souza and Ayesha Khan making special appearances in the video. "Ez-Ez" was a high-energy Punjabi track featuring vocals by Diljit Dosanjh and Hanumankind. The audio launch event was held on 1 December 2025 in Mumbai. The full album was also released on the same day. The extended album with five additional songs was released on 10 December 2025.

The song "Ishq Jalakar – Karvaan" was initially removed from YouTube as its bass guitar riff was alleged to share similarities with the 1980 song "Another One Bites the Dust" by British rock band Queen. Later, it was released again with a different bass riff.

The Arabic song titled "FA9LA" sung by Bahraini rapper Flipperachi and composed by DJ Outlaw was featured in the film when Akshaye Khanna's character visits Balochistan, Pakistan. The dance sequences were choreographed by Vijay Ganguly and shot in Ladakh and featured chaap, a Baloch folk war dance. Khanna's improvised dance steps later became a viral trend on social media.

The song "Hawa Hawa", sung and composed by Pakistani singer Hasan Jahangir (whose tune is itself based on the 1970s Persian song "Havar Havar" by Kourosh Yaghmaei) also featured during the introduction of Sanjay Dutt's character. "Dum Maro Dum" sung by Asha Bhosle and composed by R. D. Burman, also featured in the film. The song "Rambha Ho Ho Ho" from Armaan (1981) composed by Bappi Lahiri and sung by Usha Uthup was remixed in the film and sung by Madhubanti Bagchi (which in turn, was sampled from "Que Sera Mi Vida (If You Should Go)" by Gibson Brothers). The song "Teri Ni Kararan" was also a cover remix of Lal Chand Yamla Jatt's song "Das Main Ki Pyar Wichon Khatiya". The famous 1976 ghazal titled "Chupke Chupke Raat Din" from Nikaah (1982) by Ghulam Ali also featured in the film. The glimpse of the film's sequel played at the end credits of the film featured the song "Aaahh Men!" by Doja Cat (which was sampled from Knight Rider (1982) theme song by Stu Phillips and Glen Albert Larson, which in turn was probably further inspired from "Cortège de Bacchus" by Léo Delibes in his ballets Coppélia (1870) and Sylvia (1876)).

== Reception ==
Bollywood Hungama praised the overall soundtrack especially the songs "Ishq Jalakar – Karvaan" and "Gehra Hua". The Indian Express observed that while the album relies heavily on nostalgic source material, the modern reinterpretations – like the title track prove to be "effective and entertaining", suggesting the music works well in context even if it borrows from classics. India Today praised the creative reworking of retro melodies, calling the result "fresh, exciting, and tightly woven" into the film's contemporary action drama, resonating with audiences across generations. ABP Live called Shashwat Sachdev's music and Irshad Kamil's lyrics a "powerful combination", with the soundtrack – especially Ranveer Singh's entry qawwali and key background score – elevating the emotional and action sequences in the film. Zico Ghosh of Billboard India, wrote "In Bollywood, there isn’t quite anything like the Dhurandhar soundtrack. For all its ambition and ingenuity, Dhurandhar is built on a shared musical inheritance — one that doesn’t fully recognise all its contributors upfront. And in a soundtrack so invested in memory, that omission feels particularly telling."

== Track listing ==
Dhurandhar
No.	Title	Lyrics	Music	Singer(s)	Length
1.	"Dhurandhar (Title Track)"	Hanumankind, Jasmine Sandlas, Babu Singh Maan	Shashwat Sachdev, Charanjit Ahuja	Muhammad Sadiq, Ranjit Kaur, Hanumankind, Jasmine Sandlas, Sudhir Yaduvanshi, Shashwat Sachdev	2:36
2.	"Ishq Jalakar (Karvaan)"	Irshad Kamil, Sahir Ludhianvi	Shashwat Sachdev, Roshan	Shashwat Sachdev, Shahzad Ali, Subhadeep Das Chowdhury, Armaan Khan	4:10
3.	"Gehra Hua"	Irshad Kamil	Shashwat Sachdev	Arijit Singh, Armaan Khan	6:02
4.	"Teri Ni Kararan"	Lal Chand Yamla Jatt	Lal Chand Yamla Jatt, Shashwat Sachdev	Diljit Dosanjh, Shashwat Sachdev	3:58
5.	"Run Down the City – Monica"	Majrooh Sultanpuri, Reble	Shashwat Sachdev, R. D. Burman	Reble, Asha Bhosle, R. D. Burman	2:21
6.	"Shararat"	Jasmine Sandlas	Shashwat Sachdev	Madhubanti Bagchi, Jasmine Sandlas	3:44
7.	"Ez-Ez"	Raj Ranjodh, Hanumankind	Shashwat Sachdev, Raj Ranjodh	Diljit Dosanjh, Hanumankind, Shashwat Sachdev	3:03
8.	"Lutt Le Gaya"	Simran Choudhary	Shashwat Sachdev	Simran Choudhary	4:14
9.	"Move – Yeh Ishq Ishq"	Sahir Ludhianvi, Reble	Roshan, Shashwat Sachdev	Reble, Sonu Nigam	3:24
10.	"Naal Nachna"	Irshad Kamil, Reble	Shashwat Sachdev	Afsana Khan, Reble	2:35
11.	"Ramba Ho"	Indeevar	Bappi Lahiri, Shashwat Sachdev	Madhubanti Bagchi, Usha Uthup	2:47
Total length:					38:54

== Background score ==
Dhurandhar

Film score by Shashwat Sachdev
- Released: 6 July 2026
- Recorded: 2024–2025
- Venues: Vienna, Austria
- Studio: Vienna Synchron Stage
- Genre: Film score
- Length: 59:43
- Language: Hindi
- Label: Jio Studios
- Producer: Shashwat Sachdev

Shashwat Sachdev chronology
Kesari Chapter 2 (2025)	Dhurandhar (2026)	Dhurandhar: The Revenge (2026)
External audio
- Dhurandhar – Original Sound Track on YouTube

Dhurandhar-OST
No.	Title	Length
1.	"The Price of Peace"	1:35
2.	"Broken Souls"	4:45
3.	"Nation Under Fire"	3:21
4.	"The Laughing Hyenas"	0:52
5.	"One Year Later"	3:03
6.	"Death Walks on a Crutch"	1:43
7.	"Apex Predator"	2:21
8.	"The Symphony of Massacre"	6:25
9.	"Angel of Death"	2:24
10.	"Deal Between the Devils"	2:26
11.	"Traitors Trade"	2:13
12.	"The Jinn's Grin"	2:12
13.	"Three Fingers and an Ash Tray"	3:33
14.	"Trojan Horse"	2:15
15.	"Face to Face"	2:46
16.	"The Butterfly Effect"	4:32
17.	"Ghayal Hu Isiliye Ghatak Hu"	2:47
18.	"Hunting the Apex Predator"	2:25
19.	"Et Tu Brutus"	3:34
20.	"What Is Operation Dhurandhar"	2:09
Total length:		59:43

== Charts ==
Chart performance for Dhurandhar
Chart (2025–2026)	Peak position
Canadian Albums (Billboard)	71
New Zealand Albums (RMNZ)	20
US World Albums (Billboard)	7

== See also ==
- Dhurandhar: The Revenge (soundtrack)
