= Jasmine Sandlas =

American singer-songwriter and rapper (born 1994)

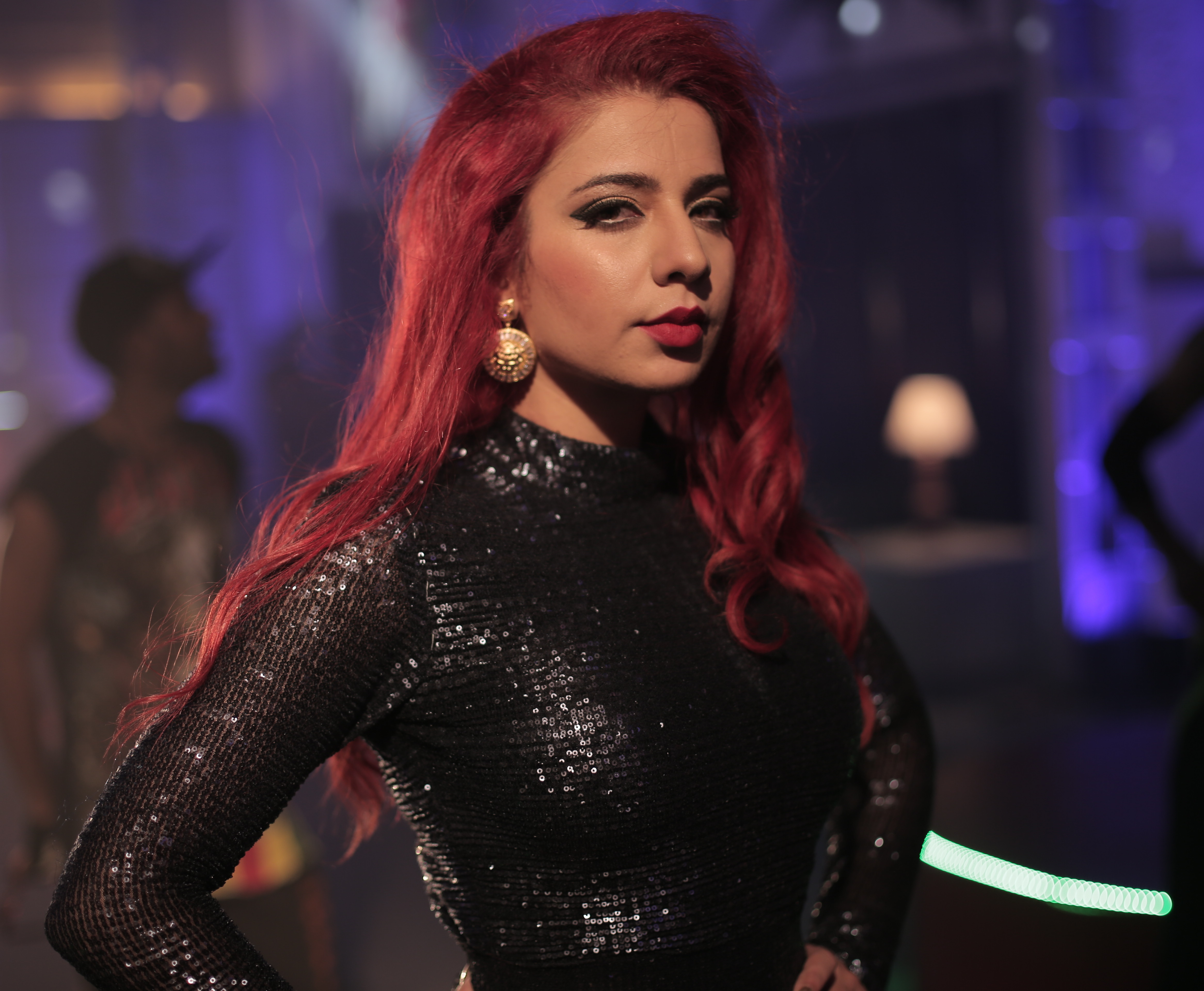
- Sandlas in 2016
- Born: 4 September 1985 (age 41); Jalandhar, Punjab, India
- Citizenship: United States
- Occupations: Singer; songwriter
- Years active: 2008–present
- Musical career
- Genres: R&B; Hindustani classical music; pop; Punjabi folk
- Instrument: Vocals
- Label: Warner Music India

Jasmine Sandlas (born 4 September 1985) is an Indian-American singer, television personality, performer, songwriter who mainly sings Punjabi songs. Sandlas was born in Jalandhar, India and raised in Stockton, California. Sandlas's first song, "Muskan" (2007), became a hit. In 2014, she began her Bollywood playback singing career with the song "Yaar Na Miley" for the film Kick. Upon its release, "Yaar Na Miley" went viral, topped the charts, and earned Sandlas widespread critical acclaim for her singing style. Her latest hits are "Taras" for the film Munjya (2024), "Shararat" and the title track from the film Dhurandhar (2025), as well as "Main Aur Tu" and "Jaiye Sajna" from Dhurandhar: The Revenge (2026). She also received several awards, including the Most Popular Song of the Year 2016 at the PTC Punjabi Film Awards and Screen Award for Best Female Playback. She was also featured on the TEDx Talks, MTV Coke Studio and Spoken Word platforms.

== Early life and background ==
Jasmine Kaur Sandlas was born in 1985 in Ropar, Punjab, India, to a Punjabi Sikh Labana family. Her mother put her on stage to sing at an early age. During her school days she participated in many song competitions and then that was the time when she got influenced by many Punjabi folk singers. At the age of 12 or 13, she and her family migrated to California, where she was inspired by West Coast music. She was only 16 when she began writing songs. Around the same time, she discovered early 2000s hip-hop and pop artists like 50 Cent, Dr. Dre, Britney Spears, Outkast, Gwen Stefani and Nelly Furtado.

== Music career ==
=== 2007–2014: Debut with The Diamond, Gulabi and Bollywood ===
Her first song, "Muskan", released in 2007, from her underground debut album The Diamond, which was subsequently released in 2008, written by Lalie Gill, achieved great success worldwide. After the launch of the album, she started receiving recognition from the mainstream Punjabi music industry.

In 2012, her debut studio album Gulabi was launched by Sony Music Company. She collaborated on the album with rapper Bohemia, who produced the album, and featured on the song "Adhi Rati", which was released as the lead single. The album was released on November 6, 2012.

Her Bollywood playback singing career began with the soundtrack of the film Kick, on which she sung the song "Yaar Naa Miley", with Yo Yo Honey Singh in 2014.

=== 2015–16: Further singles in the film industry and Angels of Rock ===
In 2015, Jasmine Sandlas released the single "Punjab De Javak". Jasmine sung two singles, "Ishq Da Sutta" and "Raat Jashan Di", for the film soundtracks of One Night Stand and Zorawar, respectively.

Jasmine was also the part of the TV series focusing on women-empowerment called Angels of Rock, by MTV India. Jasmine, along with three other artists namely, Shalmali Kholgade, Akasa Singh, Anusha Mani traveled from Mumbai to the Atarri border (travelling through Gujarat, Rajasthan, UP, Punjab along the way), covering places in rural as well as urban India. Along the way, they met some women who scripted their own success stories in varied fields and used their voice to speak up and discuss issues that urgently need attention. The pilot episode premiered on 31 July 2016.

=== 2017–2022: Successful singles, What's In A Name and debut EP ===
Starting in 2017, she released a string of commercially successful singles with singer Garry Sandhu and producer Intense, including "Illegal Weapon" and "Laddu" in 2017, and "Sip Sip" in 2018. "Sip Sip" and "Illegal Weapon" went on to be remixed and used in the film soundtrack of the Bollywood movie, Street Dancer 3D (2020).

In 2020, her third album, What's in a Name, was released on the day of her father's birthday. The album was produced by Intense and Hark. The illustration for the album cover was designed by Diksha and animation was designed by VFX Kalakaar.

TGPE (The Great Punjabi Experiment) was an experimental album that Jasmine Sandlas released to observe "if her predictions, about what kind of music people like, were right or wrong". It consisted of 9 songs. The first promotional single "Gaana Challe Ya Na" was released on 8 March 2021 and the album rollout concluded with the single release of "Dil Tutteya", which was released on 10 February 2022.

Sandlas released an EP called Tini on her birthday that included 4 songs: “Yakeen”, “Kehnda Hi Nahi”, “Hava Vich” and “Kehri Gali.” Sandlas released a single called "Jee Jeha Karda" on 7 November 2022.

=== 2023–present: Return to film soundtracks ===
Jasmine's first project of the year, "Jehri Ve" released on 30 January 2023, which also had vocals from fellow singer Gippy Grewal. The track was included on soundtrack of the Punjabi movie Mitran Da Naa Chalda. In August 2023, she dropped the Rude EP, consisting of four songs. In the same year, Jasmine was inducted into the Women Songwriter's Hall of Fame for her impact on the music industry.

In May 2024, she returned to contribute to Bollywood music, after a gap of four years, by lending her vocals to the track "Taras", for the film soundtrack of Munjya.

In 2025, she released the track "POLS", that she called "a rebirth in her artistic journey". She also collaborated with rapper Raga on the track "Brown Baddie", marking a return to her early hip-hop rooted music. She also contributed to the soundtrack of the film Raid 2, on the song "Nasha". She also released her fourth album, Legal Robbery, produced by Intense in October 2025.

In the same year, she also earned widespread praise for her collaborations with composer Shashwat Sachdev for the soundtracks for the web-series The Ba***ds of Bollywood and the film Dhurandhar.

Next year, she appeared on the soundtrack of the sequel to Dhurandhar, titled Dhurandhar: The Revenge. In April 2026, she was featured in GQ India's list of "Most Influential Young Indians of 2026". In July 2026, she kicked off her first solo nationwide 4-city tour, The Dream Girl tour.

== Discography ==
=== Soundtrack albums ===
Key
†	Denotes films that have not yet been released

==== As a singer ====
Year	Film/Show	Title	Lyrics	Music	Co-singer(s)	Length
Hindi
2014	Kick	"Yaar Na Miley"	Yo Yo Honey Singh			4:03
2015	Second Hand Husband	"Mitthi Meri Jaan"	Rahul Behenwal	Jatinder Singh Shah	Gippy Grewal	2:57
2016	One Night Stand	"Ishq Da Sutta"	Kumaar	Meet Bros		4:24
2016	Veerappan	"Khallas Veerappan"	Manoj Yadav	Shaarib- Toshi	Toshi Sabri	3:01
2016	Fuddu	"Curves Mere Killerrr Killerrr"	Satya Khare	Sumeet Bellary		3:43
2017	Machine	"Brake'an Fail"	Jasmine Sandlas, Ikka	Dr Zeus	Rajveer Singh, Ikka	4:38
2017	Naam Shabana	"Baby Besharm"	Kumaar	Meet Bros	Aditi Singh Sharma	3:46
2020	Street Dancer 3D	"Illegal Weapon 2.0"	Priya Saraiya	Tanishk Bagchi	Garry Sandhu	3:08
2020	Street Dancer 3D	"Sip Sip 2.0"	Kumaar, Garry Sandhu	Tanishk Bagchi	Garry Sandhu	3:39
2024	Munjya	"Taras Ni Aya Tujhko"	Amitabh Bhattacharya	Sachin-Jigar	Sumonto Mukherjee	3:09
2024	Ulajh	"Aaja Oye"	Jasmine Sandlas, Sudhanshu Saria	Shashwat Sachdev	Shashwat Sachdev, Malkit Singh	2:36
2025	Raid 2	"Nasha"	Jaani	White Noise Collectives	Sachet Tandon, Divya Kumar, Sumontho Mukherjee	3:00
2025	The Ba***ds of Bollywood	"Ashiqaan"	Jasmine Sandlas, Shashwat Sachdev	Shashwat Sachdev	Shashwat Sachdev	2:28
2025	Thamma	"Poison Baby"	Amitabh Bhattacharya	Sachin-Jigar	Divya Kumar, Sumonto Mukherjee, Abhishek Singh, Noor Parmar, Hitesh Purani	3:00
2025	Dhurandhar	"Dhurandhar – Title Track"	Hanumankind, Jasmine Sandlas, Babu Singh Maan	Shashwat Sachdev, Charanjit Ahuja	Muhammad Sadiq, Ranjit Kaur, Hanumankind, Sudhir Yaduvanshi	2:36
2025	Dhurandhar	"Shararat"	Jasmine Sandlas, Shashwat Sachdev	Shashwat Sachdev	Madhubanti Bagchi	3:44
2026	Ikkis	"Ban Ke Dikha Ikkis"	Amitabh Bhattacharya	White Noise Collectives	Solo	2:53
2026	Dhurandhar: The Revenge	"Aari Aari"	Irshad Kamil, Bombay Rockers, Reble, Token	Shashwat Sachdev	Shashwat Sachdev, Navtej Singh Rehal (Bombay Rockers), Khan Saab, Sudhir Yaduvanshi, Reble, Token	3:30
2026	Dhurandhar: The Revenge	"Main Aur Tu"	Jasmine Sandlas, Reble	Shashwat Sachdev	Shashwat Sachdev, Reble	3:30
2026	Dhurandhar: The Revenge	"Jaiye Sajana"	Jasmine Sandlas, Satinder Sartaaj	Shashwat Sachdev	Satinder Sartaaj	3:00
2026	Dhurandhar: The Revenge	"Rang De Lal (Oye Oye)"	Jasmine Sandlas, Reble, Anand Bakshi	Shashwat Sachdev, Kalyanji–Anandji	Afsana Khan, Reble, Amit Kumar, Sapna Mukherjee	3:20
Punjabi
2016	Zorawar	"Raat Jashan Di"	Yo Yo Honey Singh, Jasmine Sandlas	Yo Yo Honey Singh		4:55
2017	Jindua	"Chal Jindua"	Babu Singh Maan	Jaidev Kumar	Ranjit Bawa, Akasa Singh	2:16
2025	Ikk Kudi	"Khaand Lagdi"	Vicky Singh	MixSingh	Solo	2:08
Lollywood
2014	Hotal	"Mombatti"	Jasmine Sandlas		Solo	4:44
Telugu
2017	Khaidi No. 150	"Ratthalu"	Devi Sri Prasad		Nakash Aziz	4:21

==== As a lyricist ====
Year	Film/Show	Song	Co-lyricist(s)	Music	Singer(s)
Hindi
2017	Machine	"Brake An Fail"	Ikka	Dr Zeus	Jasmine Sandlas, Rajveer Singh, Ikka
2024	Ulajh	"Aaja Oye"	Sudhanshu Saria	Shashwat Sachdev	
2025	The Ba***ds of Bollywood	"Ashiqaan"	Shashwat Sachdev	Shashwat Sachdev	Jasmine Sandlas, Shashwat Sachdev
2025	The Ba***ds of Bollywood	"Ruseya"	Shashwat Sachdev	Shashwat Sachdev	Jubin Nautiyal, Shashwat Sachdev
2025	Dhurandhar	"Shararat"	Shashwat Sachdev	Shashwat Sachdev	Jasmine Sandlas, Madhubanti Bagchi
2026	Dhurandhar: The Revenge	"Main Aur Tu"	Reble	Shashwat Sachdev	Jasmine Sandlas, Reble
2026	Dhurandhar: The Revenge	"Vaari Jaavan"	Reble	Shashwat Sachdev	Jyoti Nooran, Reble
2026	Dhurandhar: The Revenge	"Jaiye Sajana"	Satinder Sartaaj	Shashwat Sachdev	Jasmine Sandlas, Satinder Sartaaj
2026	Dhurandhar: The Revenge	"Rang De Lal (Oye Oye)"	Reble, Anand Bakshi	Shashwat Sachdev, Kalyanji–Anandji	Jasmine Sandlas, Afsana Khan, Reble, Amit Kumar, Sapna Mukherjee
Punjabi
2016	Zorawar	"Raat Jashan Di"	Yo Yo Honey Singh		Yo Yo Honey Singh, Jasmine Sandlas
Lollywood
2014	Hotal	"Mombatti"		Jasmine Sandlas	

=== Singles ===
Year	Title	Co-artist(s)	Label	Notes
2010	"Famous In The Club"	Mix One Productions feat. Jasmine Sandlas & Rdikulus	The Diamond Lane Records	Collaboration
2014	"End Karade"		Universal Music India	Single
2014	"Mombatti"		Jasmine Sandlas Records	Single
2015	"Punjab De Javak"		Jasmine Sandlas Records	Single
2015	"Machis"		Jasmine Sandlas Records	Single
2015	"Pyaar De Khamb"		Jasmine Sandlas Records	Single
2016	"Tu"		Jasmine Sandlas Records	Single
2016	"Musafira"		Jasmine Sandlas Records	Single
2016	"O Laal Ni"	Jasbir Jassi	Zee Music Company	Collaboration
2016	"Kashni – A Tribute"		Jasmine Sandlas Records	Single
2016	"Sara College"		Jasmine Sandlas Records	Single
2016	"Baddal"	Intense	Jasmine Sandlas Records	Single
2016	"Aaja Dance Floor Pe"	Ramji Gulati	Zee Music Company	Collaboration
2016	"The Joke"		Jasmine Sandlas Records	Single
2017	"Laddu"	Garry Sandhu	Fresh Media Records	Single
2017	"Bamb Jatt"	Amrit Maan	White Hill Music	Collaboration
2017	"Party Nonstop"	Dr. Zeus & Ikka	EMI Records India	Collaboration
2017	"Punjabi Mutiyaran"		Yellow Music	Single
2017	"Salaam-e-Ishq"	Arko	Saregama Music	Collaboration
2017	"Vachari"	Intense	T-Series	Singles
2017	"LV Di Jean"		Speed Records	Single
2017	"Botal Khol (The Baller's Anthem)"	Knox Artiste & Mafia	T-Series	Collaboration
2017	"Illegal Weapon"	Garry Sandhu	Fresh Media records	Collaboration
2018	"Veera"	Sumit Sethi	T-Series	Single
2018	"Sip Sip"	Intense & Garry Sandhu	Fresh Media Records	Single
2018	"Patt Lai Geya"	Ranbir Grewal & Seji Dhillon	Jasmine Sandlas Records	Single
2019	"Mithi Mithi"	Intense	Crown Records	with Amrit Maan
2019	"Chunni Black"	Ranbir Grewal	Jasmine Sandlas Records	
2020	"Guglu Muglu"		Jasmine Sandlas Records	Single
2020	Punjab De Javak	Sharan Shergill	Jasmine Sandlas Records	Single
2021	Gaana Challe Ya Na	Sharan Shergill	Jasmine Sandlas Records	Single
2021	Mago	Sharan Shergill & Lil Daku	Jasmine Sandlas Records	
2021	Royi Na	Raaginder	Jasmine Sandlas Records	
2021	Thug Life	Raaginder	Jasmine Sandlas Records	Single
2021	36 Mere Wargiya	Raaginder	Jasmine Sandlas Records	Single
2021	Uth Na Khade	Raaginder	Jasmine Sandlas Records	
2021	Cali Di Babe	Jashan Dhillon	Jasmine Sandlas Records	
2021	Mood Sarkar Da	Jashan Dhillon	Jasmine Sandlas Records	
2021	Dil Tutteya	Jashan Dhillon	Jasmine Sandlas Records	
2022	Bamb Aagya	Gur Sidhu	Brown Town Music	Collaboration with Gur Sidhu
2022	Jee Jeha Karda	Seji Dhillon (music)	Jasmine Sandlas Records	
2023	Jehri Ve	Gippy Grewal	Gems tunes	
2023	Ittar	B praak (music) Jaani (lyrics)		
2023	Routine	Gur Sidhu	Brown Town Music	Collaboration with Gur Sidhu
2023	Jhumka	Dr. Zeus	Dr Zeus Worldwide	
2024	Jager	Lil Daku, Sharan Shergill	Jasmine Sandlas Records	
2024	Tola	Dilmaan (music) Gill Machhrai, Rony Ajnali (lyrics)	Warner Music India	
2024	Main Bandey	Mani Singh	Warner Music India	
2024	Guddi	KRN Walia, LATF	Warner Music India	

=== Studio albums ===
Title	Album details	Music
The Diamond	Released: 25 March 2010; Label: The Diamond Lane Records; Formats: CD, digital download	Mixman Shawn
Gulabi	Released: 29 October 2012; Label: Sony Music India; Formats: CD, digital download	Bohemia
What's in a Name	Released: 4 June 2020; Label: Jasmine Sandlas Records; Formats: CD, digital download	Intense, Hark
Tini (EP)	Released: 4 September 2022; Label: Jasmine Sandlas Records; Formats: CD, digital download	Jashan Dhillon, Krn Walia, Raaginder
Rude (EP)	Released: 2023; Label: Jasmine Sandlas Records; Formats: CD, digital download	Mofusion, Krn Walia
ASAP (As Soft As Possible) (EP)	Released: 29 April 2025; Label: Warner Music India; Formats: CD, digital download	Mofusion, Scxth
Legal Robbery	Released: 17 October 2025; Label: Warner Music India; Formats: CD, digital download	Intense

=== Collaboration and compilation albums ===
Title	Album details	Album by	Notes
The Diamond	. Released: 4 September 2012. Label: Sony Music India. Formats: CD	7. "This Song"	Mixman Shawn
Desi Revolution Vol. 1	. Released: 13 December 2011. Label: DHH. Formats: CD	3. "Na Suno"	feat. Bohemia
Ultimate Desi Hiphop Party	Released: 30 October 2014. Label: Sony Music India. Formats: CD, Digital download	8. "Adhi Raati"	feat. Bohemia

=== Coke Studio (India) ===
Title	Co-artist(s)	Music	Episode	Season	Released
"Sawan Mein"	Divya Kumar	Sachin–Jigar	2	4	12 April 2015

=== MTV Spoken Word ===
Title	Co-artist(s)	Music	Year
"Pinjra"	Badshah	Dr Zeus	2015

== Filmography ==
Year	Film	Role	Notes	Ref
2025	Dhurandhar	Singer	Special appearance as a singer in the song "Shararat"	

== Television ==
MTV India Angels Of Rock

Song	Episode	Season	Notes
"Agar Tu"	2	1	"Rudi No Radio"
"Jaagde Ke Sutte"	8	1	"Ludhiana Cares"

== Awards and nominations ==
Award	Category	Nominated work	Result	Ref.
7th Mirchi Music Awards	Upcoming Female Vocalist of The Year	"Yaar Naa Miley" from Kick	Nominated	
Brit Asia TV Music Awards 2018	Best Female Act	—N/a	Won	
Brit Asia TV Music Awards 2019	Best International Female Act	—N/a	Won	

== See also ==
- List of Indian playback singers
