= Swaran Lata (singer) =

Swaran Lata ਸ੍ਵਰਨ ਲਤਾ
- Born: Swaran Kanta; 19 November 1938 (age 87); Jarhaan Wala, Layallpur district, British Punjab
- Genres: Folk, Duets
- Occupation: Singer
- Labels: His Master's Voice

Swaran Lata (born 19 November 1938), or Swaranlata (Punjabi: ਸਵਰਨ ਲਤਾ) is a former Punjabi singer of Indian Punjab. She is known for her songs like Lai De Maye Kaalean Baagan Di Mehndi, Munh Vich Bhabi De, Nand Burkiaan Pave. She sang almost every Punjabi singer of her time, including Harcharan Garewal, Karamjit Dhuri, Karnail Gill, Muhammad Sadiq, Didar Sandhu, Gurcharan Pohli, Ramesh Rangila, Jagat Singh Jagga, Daleep Singh Deep and Mahendra Kapoor. Most of her recording is found with Karamjit Dhuri with whom she performed in live shows for the longest time as well.

Due to the political situations in Punjab, she stop doing live shows in 1988 and her last performance was at Dhillwan.
