= Patola (film) =

Patola ਪਟੋਲਾ
- Directed by: Jagjit Gill
- Written by: Rajinder Rajan
- Screenplay by: Babu Singh Maan
- Produced by: Joginder Pardesi,
- Starring: Veerendra, Gurcharan Pohli Daljeet Kaur
- Music by: Muhammad Sadiq
- Release date: 25 March 1988
- Country: India
- Language: Punjabi

Patola ("beautiful girl") is a 1988 Punjabi film, produced by J.P. Pardesi, Rammi Bhalwan and Manjit Lovely. It was directed by Jagjeet, with music by Mohammad Sadiq.

== Cast ==
- Veerendra ... Balwant 'Ballu'
- Gurcharan Pohli ... Mangal
- Daljeet Kaur ... Raani
- Shobhini Singh ... Taaro
- Satish Kaul ... Amar
- Surinder Shinda ... Dharma
- Gauri Khurana ... Gurmeet kaur
- Amar Singh Chamkila ... Live Performance- Akhara
- Amarjyot Kaur ... Live Performance- Akhara
- Mohammad Sadiq ... Kishna Kautki
- Mehar Mittal ... Ghichroo
- Pooja Lakhi ... Melo
- Ranjit Kaur ... Special appearance in Gidha
- Harbhajan Jabbal ... Tota Amli
- Saroop Parinda ... Chachi
- Rami Pehalwan
