= Gurmel Singh Dhillon =

- Birth name: Gurmel Singh
- Also known as: Dhillon Bhukhianwali Wala
- Born: Bhukhianwali, Punjab, India
- Died: Bhukhianwali, Punjab, India
- Genres: Romance, social
- Occupation: Songwriter

Gurmel Singh Dhillon was an Indian songwriter and lyricist of Panjabi music. As was the trend then, he wrote mostly duets. While many of the then well-known Punjabi singers sang his songs, the Muhammad Sadiq-Ranjit Kaur duo sung the most number of his songs.

== Early life ==
Gurmail Singh Dhillon belonged to a village Bhukhianwali (now Bhagwangarh) of Bathinda district of Punjab, India and was a bank employee. After his death, his wife and daughter still live in the village.

== Songs ==
1. Aakhri Tarik Mere Yaar Di
2. Do Aar Dian Do Paar Dian
3. Miloon Pehr De Tarke
4. Aai Lukdi Lukaundi
5. Sun Ke Lalkaara Tera
6. Ho Gai Dabbi Meri Khali
7. Ajj Ton Nahi Peeni Daru

== See also ==
- Babu Singh Maan
- Dev Tharike Wala
- Didar Sandhu
- Muhammad Sadiq
- Ranjit Kaur
