= Harcharan Garewal =

- Born: Harcharan Singh Garewal; 1 October 1930; Jodhan Mansuran, Punjab Province, British India
- Origin: Ludhiana, India
- Died: 6 May 1990 (aged 59) Ludhiana, Punjab, India
- Genres: Folk, Duets
- Occupation: Singer
- Instrument: Harmonium
- Years active: Unknown–1990
- Label: His Master's Voice

Harcharan Garewal (1 oct.1930 – 6 May 1990) was an Indian singer of Punjabi-language folk songs and duets. He is known for his songs like Tota Pee Gia Bullan Di Laali, and duets with Surinder Kaur like Lakk Hille Majajan Jaandi Da, Main Vi Jatt Ludhiane Da, Aa Gia Wanjara Ni Charha Lai Bhabi Churhian and with Seema like Mittran De Tubewell 'te. Many Punjabi singers used to accompany him on stage with music instruments or so before releasing their own records including Kuldeep Manak.

== Life and career ==
Garewal was born in 1934/35 in village Jodhan Mansuran in Layallpur district (renamed Faisalabad District) in British Punjab. After the Partition of India in 1947, his family moved to Jamalpur Awana Ludhiana area in Indian Punjab.

He never sung, even in his college time, until he listened to Lal Chand Yamla Jatt. Inspired by him, he started learning music from Jaswant Bhanwra. He first sung solos and later sung duets with many female singers including Surinder Kaur, Seema, Narinder Biba and Swaran Lata.

== Notable songs ==
His solos and duets were both successful. Here are some of his notable songs.

=== Solos ===
1. Tota Pee Gia Bullan Di Laali
2. Bhakhre 'ton Aundi Mutiar Nachdi,
3. Chhareyan Di Joon Buri
4. Tere Ik-Ik Gerhe Da Hazaar Mull Ni

=== Duets ===
with Surinder Kaur:

1. Lakk Hille Majajan Jaandi Da (penned by Inderjit Hasanpuri)
2. Adhi Raat Takk Main Parhdi
3. Aa Gia Wanjara Ni Charha Lai Bhabi Churhiyan (penned by Babu Singh Maan)
4. Main Vailan Ho Jaungi (penned by Babu Singh Maan)

with Narinder Biba:

1. Tere Bote Di Muhar Ban Jaawan
2. Uda, Aada, Eedi

with Seema:

1. Mittran De Tubewell 'te
2. Phull Kadhda Phulkari (penned by Gurdev Singh Maan)
