= Afsana Khan =

Indian singer and songwriter

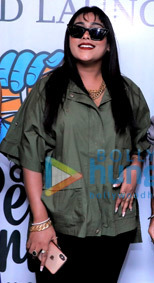

Background information
- Born: 12 June 1994 (age 32)
- Genres: Pop; Film
- Occupations: Singer; songwriter; playback singer
- Instrument: Vocals
- Years active: 2019–present
- Spouse: Saajz Sharma (m. 2022)

Afsana Khan is an Indian Punjabi playback singer, actress and songwriter. She started her career as a participant in the singing reality show, Voice of Punjab Season 3 in 2012. She is known for her tracks "Titliaan" and "Dhakka" with Sidhu Moose Wala. In 2021, she participated in the reality show Bigg Boss 15.

== Career ==
In 2012, Afsana participated in the singing reality show Voice of Punjab and reached the top 5 of the show. In 2017, Khan appeared in the singing reality show Rising Star Season 1 as a contestant where she finished in the Top 7. During an interview, Afsana shared that she didn't know any Bollywood song when she appeared for the auditions of the show. She prepared the song "Jag Suna Suna Lage" on the auditions venue itself and got selected for the show. Afterwards she started singing in the Punjabi music industry with various labels.

== Personal life ==
Khan married her long-time boyfriend, singer Saajz (also known as Sajan Sharma) on 20 February 2022.

== Filmography ==
=== Television ===
Year	Title	Role	Notes
2012	Voice of Punjab 3	Contestant	Top 5
2017	Rising Star 1	Contestant	Top 7
2021	Bigg Boss 15	Contestant	Ejected Day 40 – 17th place

== Selected discography ==
=== Singles ===
Title	Year	Label
Bazaar	2020	Speed Records
Pair	2020	Beat Muzik
Titliaan	2020	Desi Melodies
Kamaal Karte Ho	2020	HSR Entertainment
Kadar (with Mani Sandhu)	2020	T-Series
855 (with R Nait)	2020	Speed Records
Waffa (with Rana Jethuwal)	2020	Aish Studio and N Star Entertainment
Banglow (with Avvy Sra)	2020	Desi Melodies
Soch (with Avvy Verma)	2020	Hanjii Music
Kisaan Anthem	2020	Shree Brar
Balam Ka System (with Fazilpuria)	2021	White Hill Dhaakad
Srinagar Waliye (with Jaggi Amargarh)	2021	Music Builderzz
Koi Hor (with Dilnoor)	2021	Pellet Drum Production
Zakham	2021	Planet Recordz
Jodaa	2021	VYRL Originals
Dhokebaaz	2022	VYRL Originals

=== Selected songs ===
- Lala Lori
- Jaani Ve Jaani
- Dhakka
- Naina De Thekay
- Dila Himmat Kar
- Gutt Utte
- Chandigarh Shehr
- Black Night
- Maarna A Menu
- Nakhre Jatti De
- Tera Pyaar
- Jine Dukh
- Badmashi
- Vailpuna
- Hawa Karda
- Unf*ckwithable (with Sidhu Moose Wala)
- Tere Laare
- Na Maar
- Mere Kol

== Film songs ==
Year	Film	Song	Music	Lyrics	Co-singer(s)
2023	Sukhee	"Nasha"	Badshah–Hiten	Raja Dilwala	Badshah, Chakshu Kotwal
2023	Sukhee	"Nasha" (Badshah Version)	Badshah–Hiten	Raja Dilwala	Badshah, Chakshu Kotwal
2025	Sky Force	Tu Hai Toh Main Hoon"	Tanishk Bagchi	Irshad Kamil	Arijit Singh
2025	Ground Zero	"So Lene De"	Tanishk Bagchi	Vayu	Jubin Nautiyal
2025	Tehran	"Yaar Bichhda"	Tanishk Bagchi	Irshad Kamil	
2025	Dhurandhar	"Naal Nachana"	Shashwat Sachdev	Irshad Kamil, Reble	Reble
2026	Dhurandhar: The Revenge	"Rang De Lal (Oye Oye)"	Shashwat Sachdev, Kalyanji–Anandji	Jasmine Sandlas, Reble, Anand Bakshi	Jasmine Sandlas, Reble, Amit Kumar, Sapna Mukherjee

== Controversy ==
During Khan's visit to her old school, a government senior secondary school in Badal village, parts of the music video for her "Dhakka" song were filmed. The resulting video went viral and acomplaint was filed with the police as the song appeared to promote gun culture.
