= Narinder Biba =

Narinder Biba ਨਰਿੰਦਰ ਬੀਬਾ
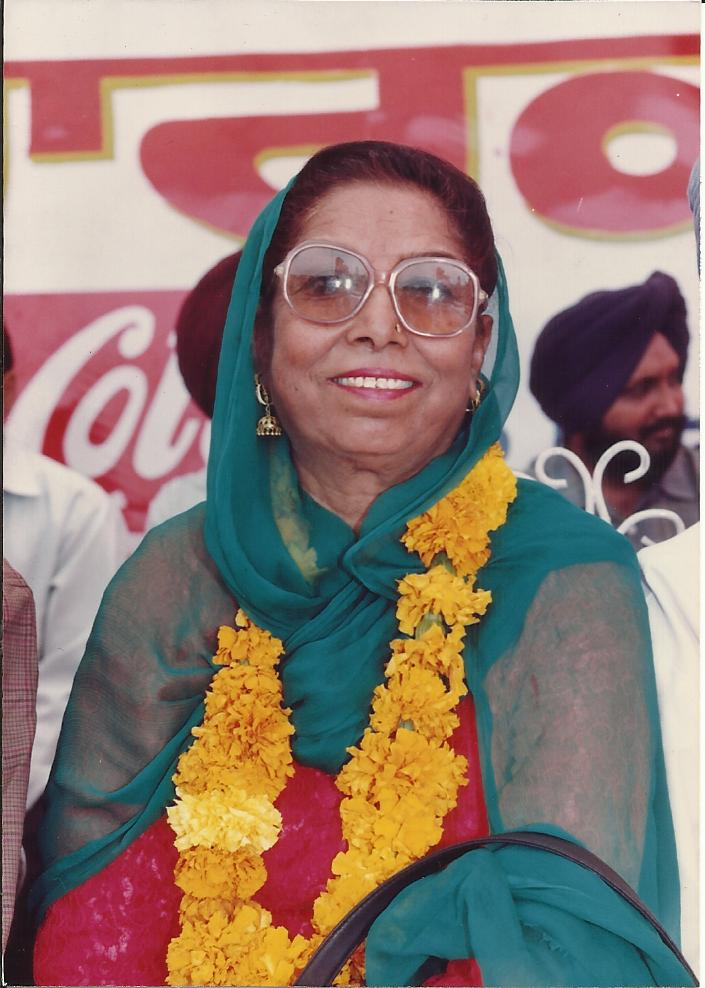

Background information
- Also known as: Biba Ji
- Born: Narinder Kaur ਨਰਿੰਦਰ ਕੌਰ; 13 April 1941
- Died: 27 June 1997 (aged 56)
- Genres: Punjabi Folk
- Occupation: Singer

Narinder Biba (Punjabi: ਨਰਿੰਦਰ ਬੀਬਾ) was a Punjabi singer from Punjab, India. She was known for performing Punjabi folk songs, love ballads (including numbers by Mirza Sahiban and Sassi Punnun), and songs related to Sikh history, such as Saka Sirhind.

== Family and career ==
Biba was married to Jaspal Singh Sodhi. She is regarded as a respected folk artist from the 1960s until the end of her career in the 1990s. She started her career with singer Jagat Singh Jagga. She recorded duets songs with various Punjabi singers, including Harcharan Grewal, Muhammad Sadiq, Didar Sandhu, Karnail Gill, Ranbir Singh Rana, Gurcharan Pohli, and Faqir Singh Faqirs. She also recorded songs penned by lyricist such as Dev Tharikewala, Babu Singh Maan, and Inderjeet Hasanpuri, among others.

== Famous songs ==
- India Punjab hoshiarpur
- Wadhaiyan Bibi Tainu
- Ladoo Khaa Ke Turdi Bani
- Kall Na Javin Khet Nu
- Mukh Morh Gye Dilan De Jaani
- Aah Lai Maaye Sambh Kunjian
- Paase Hatt Ja Jalma Punjaban Jatti Aayi
- Chann Mata Gujri da
- Do Bariyan Keemti Jindan
- Mata Gujri Nu Devo Ni Wadayian

== Today ==
In every September in Sadiqpur village, a fair, Narinder Biba Yaadgari Sabhiacharak Mela, is organised by the Doaba Sabhiacharak club in her memory.

== See also ==
- Surinder Kaur
- Didar Sandhu
- Dev Tharikewala
