= Jogi (Panjabi MC song) =

- Official song cover

Single by Panjabi MC

from the album Jogi EP
- Released: 2003
- Genre: Bhangra, alternative hip hop
- Length: 3:12
- Label: Dharma Recordings (UK), Superstar Recordings (Germany, Netherlands), Big Star Records (Sweden)
- Songwriters: Babu Singh Mann; Rajinder Rai (Panjabi MC)
- Producer: Panjabi MC

Panjabi MC singles chronology
"Mundian To Bach Ke" (2002)	"Jogi" (2003)	"Chaiyya Chaiyya" (2006)

Audio sample
- file; help

"Jogi" (lit. 'Jogi' or 'Yogi') is a song by British-Indian bhangra artist and DJ Panjabi MC. Some remix versions also credit Beenie Man. It is a remix of the 1995 song "Na De Dil Pardesi Nu" (lit. 'Don't Give Your Heart to the Stranger') by singers Muhammad Sadiq (male vocals) and Ranjit Kaur (female vocals) with music by Charanjit Ahuja and lyrics by Babu Singh Mann.

"Jogi" also contains samples from "It's a New Day" by Skull Snaps and "Put It On" by Big L and Kid Capri. The song was included on Panjabi MC's album The Album that also contains his major hit "Mundian To Bach Ke".

== Jogi EP ==
Panjabi MC released an EP also titled Jogi on 29 July 2003 with various mixes:

1. Panjabi MC & Beenie Man - "Jogi" - 3:53
2. Panjabi MC & Beenie Man - "Jogi" (New York mix) - 3:43
3. Panjabi MC - "Jogi" - 3:12
4. Panjabi MC - "Jogi" (Deichkind short mix) - 3:49
5. Panjabi MC - "Jogi" (Sleepwalker mix) 3:35
6. Panjabi MC - "Jogi" (Deichkind mix) - 4:55
7. Panjabi MC & Beenie Man - "Jogi" (New York instrumental mix) 3:36
8. Panjabi MC - "Jogi" (main instrumental mix) - 3:55

== Charts ==
=== Weekly charts ===
Chart (2003)	Peak position
Australia (ARIA)	92
Austria (Ö3 Austria Top 40)	10
Belgium (Ultratip Bubbling Under Flanders)	5
Belgium (Ultratip Bubbling Under Wallonia)	9
France (SNEP)	75
Germany (GfK)	12
Hungary (Dance Top 40)	12
Hungary (Rádiós Top 40)	18
Hungary (Single Top 40)	4
Ireland (IRMA)	47
Italy (FIMI)	30
Switzerland (Schweizer Hitparade)	8

=== Year-end charts ===
Chart (2003)	Position
Germany (Official German Charts)	93
Switzerland (Schweizer Hitparade)	34

== Personnel ==
- Panjabi MC (Rajinder Rai) - production, samples, programming
- Marcel Stepel - bass
- Andre Dembkowski - guitar, keyboards, co-production
- Mohammed Siddiq - vocals
- Ranjit Kaur - vocals

== In popular culture ==
The song has become subject of many covers, samples and remixes notably by Woofer in his release "Harie".

The song was featured in the 2014 video game Far Cry 4.

The title track of the 2025 Hindi film Dhurandhar is a remake of the 1995 original "Na De Dil Pardesi Nu".
