= Balamgarh =

- village
- Location in Punjab, India Balamgarh (India)
- Coordinates: 30°26′N 75°51′E
- Country: India
- State: Punjab

Languages
  - Official: Punjabi
- Time zone: UTC+5:30 (IST)

Balamgarh is a village in tehsil Dhuri district Sangrur (Punjab, India). This is a small village with most of the people with gotra Madahar or Marahar. The village consists of around 150 houses with mostly Sikh Jatt, some Muslims and Hindus.
