= Dhurandhar: The Revenge (soundtrack) =

2026 soundtrack album by Shashwat Sachdev

- Soundtrack album cover

Soundtrack album by Shashwat Sachdev
- Released: 17 March 2026 (standard); 24 March 2026 (extended)
- Recorded: 2025–2026
- Genre: Feature film soundtrack
- Length: 19:18 (standard); 1:04:17 (extended)
- Languages: Hindi; Punjabi; Arabic; English
- Label: T-Series
- Producer: Shashwat Sachdev

Shashwat Sachdev chronology
Dhurandhar (2025)	Dhurandhar: The Revenge (2026)	The Indian House (TBA)
External audio
- Dhurandhar: The Revenge (Full Album) on YouTube
- Dhurandhar: The Revenge (Extended Album) on YouTube

Singles from Dhurandhar: The Revenge
- 1. "Aari Aari" Released: 12 March 2026; 2. "Main Aur Tu" Released: 17 March 2026

Dhurandhar: The Revenge is the soundtrack album to the 2026 film of the same name written and directed by Aditya Dhar and produced by Aditya Dhar, Lokesh Dhar and Jyoti Deshpande under Jio Studios and B62 Studios. The film stars Ranveer Singh, Arjun Rampal, Sanjay Dutt, R. Madhavan, Rakesh Bedi and Sara Arjun. The soundtrack consisted of five songs, two of them being previously released as singles, composed by Shashwat Sachdev, with lyrics written by Irshad Kamil and Kumaar. The soundtrack was released through T-Series on 17 March 2026, coinciding with the film's audio launch event held in Mumbai. An extended version with twelve additional songs was released on 24 March 2026.

== Development ==
This was Sachdev's third collaboration with Dhar, following Uri: The Surgical Strike (2019) and Dhurandhar (2025). The music rights were acquired by T-Series for ₹27 crore, thus replacing Saregama. Initially, reports claimed that music rights were acquired for price of ₹45–60 crore, but those figures were later shown to be incorrect.

Like the previous film, the soundtrack again features several retro classic Hindi songs remixed and sampled with a modern touch, as well as songs sung in Punjabi and Urdu.

== Release ==
The film's teaser featured the song "Aaahh Men!" sung by Doja Cat (which was sampled from Knight Rider (1982) theme song by Stu Phillips and Glen Albert Larson, which in turn was probably further inspired from "Cortège de Bacchus" by Léo Delibes in his ballets Coppélia (1870) and Sylvia (1876). The song also appears in the film. The first single from the album, "Aari Aari", was released on 12 March 2026, coinciding with Dhar's 43rd birthday. This song also featured in the film's trailer and is a remix of the eponymous 2003 song by Bombay Rockers, who also recorded new vocals for the remix, marking their comeback to Bollywood after 6 years. The second single titled "Main Aur Tu", sung by Jasmine Sandlas with an English-language rap verse by Reble, was released on 17 March 2026. An extended play containing five songs from the album was released on the same day at the Nita Mukesh Ambani Cultural Centre in Mumbai. The extended album with eleven additional songs was released on 24 March 2026.

Among the original songs on the album, the song "Phir Se" is sung by Arijit Singh, and is featured at the end of the film. It incorporates a veena segment performed by maestro Ramana Balachandhran. The songs "Vaari Jaavan" and "Tere Ishq Ne" feature vocals by Jyoti Nooran, while "Wild Ride" is sung by Lebanese-American singer Ellisar. Jubin Nautiyal provides vocals on "Aakhri Ishq" and "Kanhaiyya". The Punjabi song "Jaiye Sajana" was written and sung by Satinder Sartaaj alongside Jasmine Sandlas. Sandlas provides vocals on several other songs on the album, including "Aari Aari", "Main Aur Tu", "Rang De Lal (Oye Oye)" and "Vaari Jaavan".

=== Remakes and remixes ===
The song "Jaan Se Guzarte Hain" is a remake of a 1977 song titled "Dil Pe Zakham Khate Hain" by Nusrat Fateh Ali Khan. The song "Destiny – Mann Atkeya" is a remix of the 1992 song "Man Atkeya Beparwah De Naal" by Nusrat Fateh Ali Khan.

The song "Didi (Sher-e-Baloch)" is a remix of the 1991 Arabic song "Didi" by Khaled, and is featured in the film when Ranveer Singh's character visits Balochistan, Pakistan, serving as a follow-up to "FA9LA" from the first film. The song features vocals by Moroccan singer Nabil El Houri and Kuwaiti khaliji rap duo Sons of Yusuf. The dance sequences were choreographed by Vijay Ganguly and shot in Ladakh and feature tasheer, a folk gun dance of Hijaz in Saudi Arabia, and chaap, a Baloch folk war dance.

The song "Tamma Tamma" is a remix of "Tamma Tamma Loge" from Thanedaar (1990) and was featured in the film during the assassination of Sanjay Dutt's character SP Chaudhary Aslam.

The song "Rang De Lal (Oye Oye)" is a remix of "Tirchi Topiwale" from Tridev (1989) (itself sampled from "Rhythm Is Gonna Get You" by Gloria Estefan and Miami Sound Machine) sung by Sandlas, Afsana Khan, Reble, Amit Kumar and Sapna Mukherjee. Both Kumar and Mukherjee's vocals were retained from the original track.

"Hum Pyaar Karne Wale" is a remix of the song of the same name from Dil (1990). The song "Bekasi" is a remix of "Kabhi Bekasi Ne Maara" from Alag Alag (1985).

Other songs, including "Jumma Chumma De De" from Hum (1991) composed by Laxmikant–Pyarelal, "Mujhe Zindagi Ne Mara" from Angaaray (1986) and "Baazigar O Baazigar" from Baazigar (1993) also feature in the film. The film also features the 1978 single "Rasputin" by Boney M. during one of its final scenes.

== Reception ==
Bollywood Hungama stated, "the film's music may not be as legendary as the first part, but it has its own charm and is well incorporated and also praised songs like 'Aari Aari' and 'Jaan Se Guzarte Hain'". News18 praised the film's soundtrack and its effective role in enhancing film's overall impact; they also praised the incorporation of old, familiar songs within the narrative. The Week also praised Shashwat Sachdev's musical score and praised the inclusion of retro iconic tracks, but at the same time said that overall soundtrack is just a notch below the former one.

Hindustan Times said that "the film's soundtrack may not be good as the first one", however the background score was praised especially in the climax. The Hindu said that even though Shashwat's soundtrack does not match energy of first part, however repurposed old songs like "Rasputin", "Tamma Tamma" and "Tirchi Topiwale" are fun in spots but felt more slapped than iconic. Zico Ghosh of Billboard India, wrote "In Bollywood, there isn’t quite anything like the Dhurandhar soundtrack. For all its ambition and ingenuity, Dhurandhar is built on a shared musical inheritance — one that doesn’t fully recognise all its contributors upfront. And in a soundtrack so invested in memory, that omission feels particularly telling."

== Track listing ==
Dhurandhar The Revenge
No.	Title	Lyrics	Singer(s)	Length
1.	"Aari Aari"	Irshad Kamil, Bombay Rockers, Reble, Token	Navtej Singh Rehal (Bombay Rockers), Shashwat Sachdev, Khan Saab, Jasmine Sandlas, Sudhir Yaduvanshi, Reble, Token	3:30
2.	"Main Aur Tu"	Jasmine Sandlas, Reble	Jasmine Sandlas, Reble, Shashwat Sachdev	3:30
3.	"Jaan Se Guzarte Hain" (composed by Nusrat Fateh Ali Khan)	Iqbal Safipuri, Nusrat Fateh Ali Khan	Khan Saab, Shashwat Sachdev	5:31
4.	"Aakhri Ishq"	Irshad Kamil	Jubin Nautiyal	4:21
5.	"Wild Ride"	Ellisar	Ellisar, Shashwat Sachdev	2:52
6.	"Vaari Jaavan"	Jasmine Sandlas, Reble	Jyoti Nooran, Reble	4:09
7.	"Phir Se"	Irshad Kamil	Arijit Singh	5:53
8.	"Didi (Sher-e-Baloch)" (composed by Khaled)	Sons of Yusuf, Khaled	Nabil El Houri, Shashwat Sachdev, Sons of Yusuf	2:32
9.	"Destiny – Mann Atkeya" (Co-composed by Nusrat Fateh Ali Khan)	Token, Shah Hussain	Vaibhav Gupta, Shahzad Ali, Token, Shashwat Sachdev	3:46
10.	"Rang De Lal (Oye Oye)" (composed by Kalyanji–Anandji)	Jasmine Sandlas, Reble, Anand Bakshi	Jasmine Sandlas, Afsana Khan, Reble, Amit Kumar, Sapna Mukherjee	3:20
11.	"Jaiye Sajana"	Satinder Sartaaj, Jasmine Sandlas	Jasmine Sandlas, Satinder Sartaaj	2:59
12.	"Tere Ishq Ne"	Kumaar	Jyoti Nooran	5:38
13.	"Hum Pyar Karne Wale" (Co-composed by Anand–Milind)	Qveen Herby, Sameer Anjaan	Anuradha Paudwal, Udit Narayan, Qveen Herby	3:28
14.	"Kanhaiyya"	Nawab Sadiq Jung Bahadur 'Hilm'	Jubin Nautiyal	4:53
15.	"Bekasi" (Composed by R. D. Burman)	Anand Bakshi	Kishore Kumar	2:09
16.	"Tamma Tamma" (composed by Bappi Lahiri)	Indeevar	Anuradha Paudwal, Bappi Lahiri	3:58
17.	"Baari Barsi" (composed by Atul Sharma)	Shamsher Sandhu	Surjit Bindrakhia	1:48
Total length:				1:04:17

== Charts ==
Chart performance for Dhurandhar: The Revenge
Chart (2026)	Peak position
Canadian Albums (Billboard)	66
Irish Independent Albums (IRMA)	17
New Zealand Albums (RMNZ)	24
UK Album Downloads (Official Charts)	45
UK Soundtrack Albums (Official Charts)	43
US Soundtrack Albums (Billboard)	17
US World Albums (Billboard)	8

== See also ==
- Dhurandhar (soundtrack)
