= Tumbi =

Punjabi musical instrument

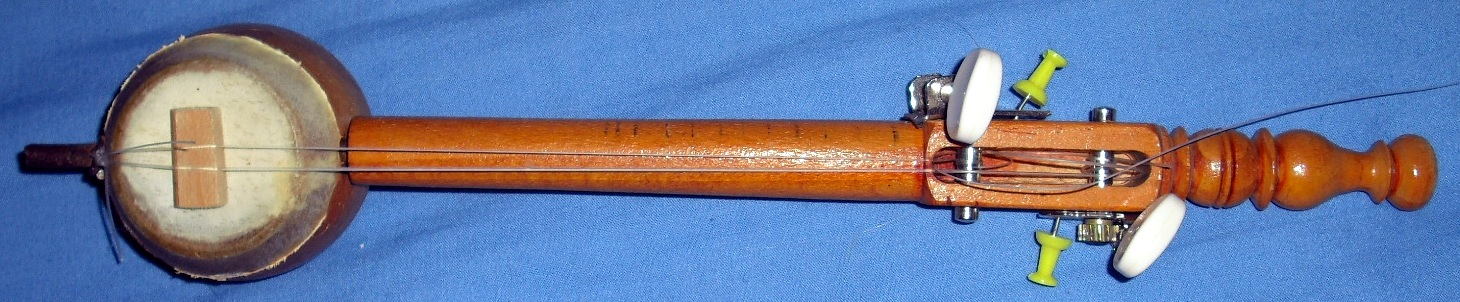

one-stringed instrument
- Other names: Toombi, thumbi
- Classification: String instruments

More articles or information
- Kuldeep Manak, Bhangra

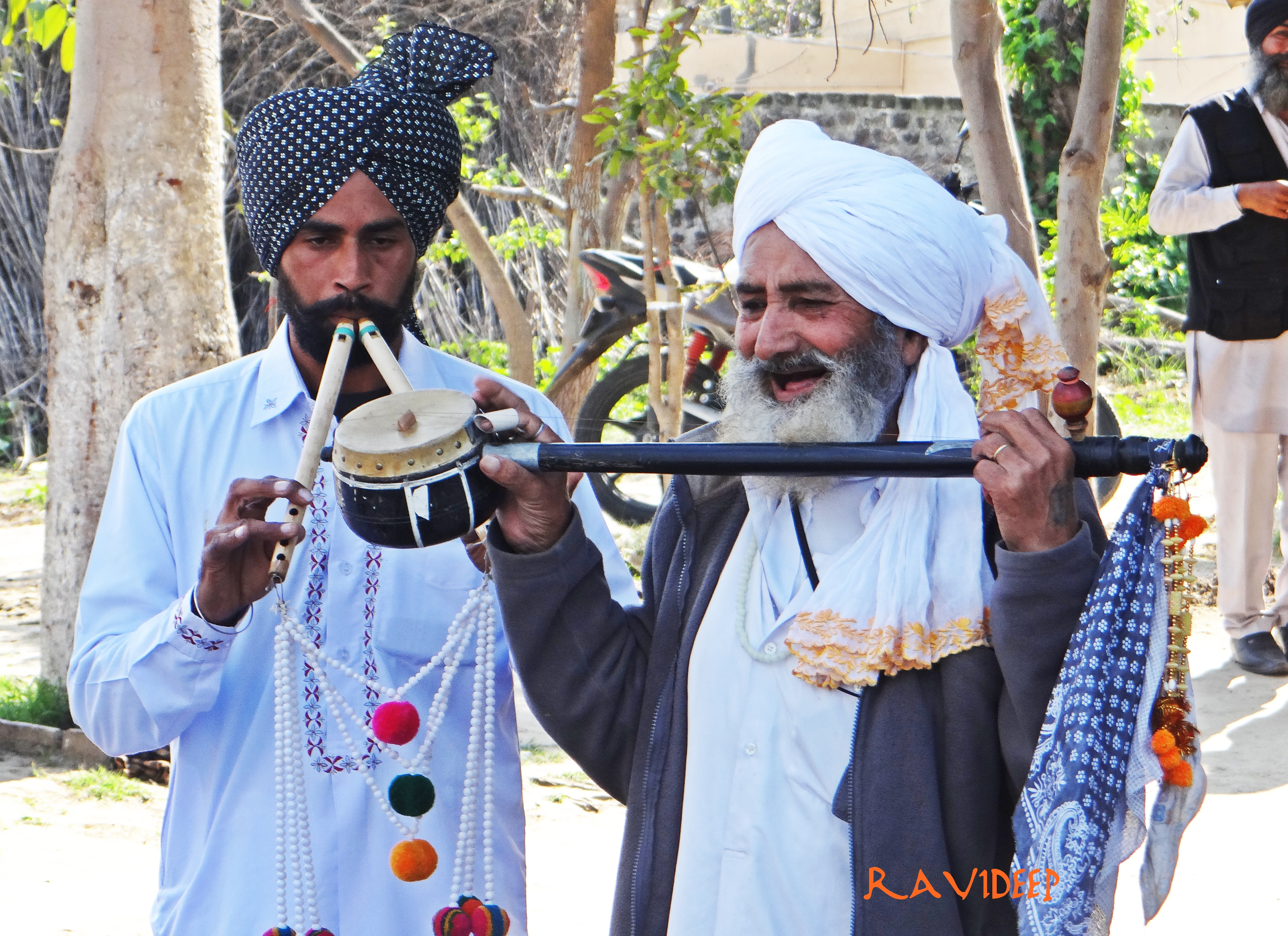
Toomba and algoza.

The tumbi or toombi (Punjabi: ਤੂੰਬੀ, pronunciation: tūmbī), also called a tumba or toomba, is a traditional musical instrument from the Punjab region of the northern Indian subcontinent. The high-pitched, single-string plucking instrument is associated with folk music of Punjab and presently very popular in Western Bhangra music.

The tumbi was popularized in the modern era by the Punjabi folksinger Lal Chand Yamla Jatt (1914-1991). In the 1960s, 1970s, and 1980s many Punjabi singers adopted the tumbi, notably Kuldeep Manak, Mohammed Sadiq, Didar Sandhu and Amar Singh Chamkila. Other users include Punjabi Sufi singers such as Saeen Zahoor.

The instrument is made of a wooden stick mounted with a gourd shell resonator. A single metallic string passes across the resonator over a bridge and is tied to a tuning key at the end of the stick. Players strike the string with a continuous flick and retraction of the first finger to produce sound.

== Use in Western music ==
- "Get Ur Freak On", 2001 hit single by Missy Elliott produced by Timbaland, saw the introduction of the distinct tumbi sound into the popular mainstream music scene.
- "Mundian Ton Bach Ke Rahin" ("Beware of the Boys") from Panjabi MC, a huge hit in the UK charts, is perhaps the most widely known example of the use of tumbi in popular Western music.
- "20 Inch" by Master P (featuring Jamaican reggae artist Cutty Ranks and rap artist Kobra Khan) included tumbi played by Toronto, Ontario, Canadian native Shawn Ramta (grandson of the famous Punjabi folk singer, Hazara Singh Ramta).
- "Baby Doll" features tumbi throughout the song.

== Players ==
- Lal Chand Yamla Jatt
- Mohammed Sadiq
- Kuldeep Manak
- Didar Sandhu
- Amar Singh Chamkila
- Manmohan Waris
- Sarbjit Cheema
- Sukshinder Shinda
- Saeen Zahoor
- Sangtar

== See also ==
- Ektara India
- Ek Tare Nepal
- Kendara
- Khamak
