= Dil Pe Zakham Khate Hain =

Qawwali performed by Nusrat Fateh Ali Khan

Song by Nusrat Fateh Ali Khan
- Language: Urdu
- Released: 1977
- Genre: Qawwali
- Composer: Nusrat Fateh Ali Khan
- Lyricists: Iqbal Safipuri; Nusrat Fateh Ali Khan

"Dil Pe Zakham Khate Hain" (Urdu: دل پہ زخم کھاتے ہیں, romanized: dil pe zaxm khātē haiñ, lit. 'We take wounds upon our heart') is an Urdu qawwali that was originally composed and performed by Ustad Nusrat Fateh Ali Khan in 1977. The lyrics were written by Iqbal Safipuri and Nusrat Fateh Ali Khan. Dil Pe Zakhm Khate Hain has inspired remakes from numerous artists including Jubin Nautiyal It was also remade by composer Shashwat Sachdev for Aditya Dhar's 2026 Hindi film Dhurandhar: The Revenge.

== Description ==
True to the classic Islamic Sufi tradition, the lyrics of “Dil Pe Zakhm Khate Hain” can be understood in two distinct yet interconnected ways: as an expression of intense earthly romantic love for a human beloved, and as an articulation of profound spiritual love for Allah (God). This dual interpretation allows the same images of wounds, separation, and longing to evoke both the pain of human attachment and the soul’s yearning for the Divine.

In the Sufi reading, the "beloved" may be interpreted as symbolizing God, in line with a long interpretative tradition in which human love functions as a veiled expression of divine love. The lyrics portray the lover’s willing endurance of emotional pain and unwavering devotion as central to the experience of love, which may be understood mystically as the seeker’s journey towards proximity with the Divine. The line "Dil pe zakham khate hain, jaan se guzarte hain” (“We take wounds upon our heart, we go past the point of living”) conveys an intensified form of self-sacrificial love, and within a Sufi interpretive framework may be read as symbolically resonant with the dissolution of the ego along the path of love. The image of the beloved passing "Jab woh ajnabi ban kar paas se guzarte hain” ("When they pass by us like strangers") captures the pain of divine concealment (the sense of God’s hiddenness), which paradoxically intensifies longing. Conversely, “Unki ik tawajo se kitne zakhm bharte hain” ("With a single glance, so many wounds are healed") evokes the transformative power of divine grace, suggesting how fleeting moments of divine regard possess the power to heal the accumulated wounds of the heart. The helpless confession “Dil ko kya karein sahib, hum unhi pe marte hain” (“What can we do with this heart, sir? We are devoted only to them”) underscores total, unwavering orientation toward the beloved despite suffering and distance. Together, these lyrics demonstrate how pain, separation, and fleeting moments of grace become vehicles for deeper spiritual realization, all while remaining deeply rooted in authentic human emotion.
