= Reble =

Indian rapper and songwriter (born 2000/01)

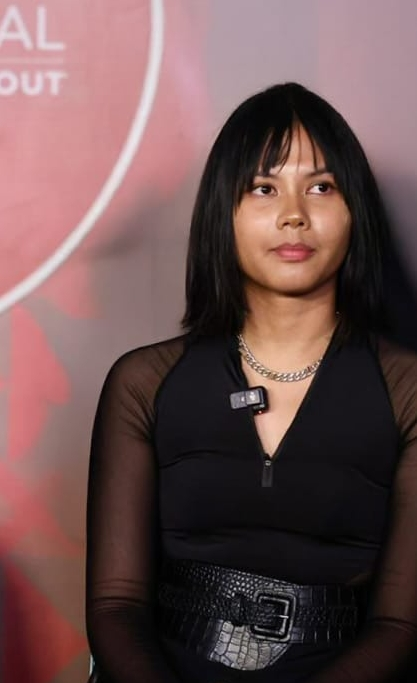
- Reble at North East Music Festival in 2026
- Born: Daiaphi Lamare; 2000 or 2001 (age 24–25); Nangbah, West Jaintia Hills, Meghalaya, India
- Other names: Reble; Daya
- Education: Visvesvaraya Technological University (BTech)
- Occupation: Rapper
- Years active: 2018–present
- Musical career
- Genre: Hip-hop
- Instrument: Vocals
- Label: Kamani Records, Atlantic Records, Homegrown Music

Daiaphi Lamare, known professionally as Reble, is an Indian rapper and songwriter, hailing from Meghalaya, India. Her music blends hip-hop with elements from trap, hardcore, alternative, and R&B. Magazines such as Femina, Elle India, and Rolling Stone India have featured her work, noting its bold lyricism. In 2021, Vogue India named her among eight emerging Indian women in hip-hop. Her single "Talk of the Town" was also featured in Rolling Stone India on their "The Best Indian Independent Singles of 2022" list.

Reble began her career in 2018 where she performed under her stage name, Daya, collaborating with Symphonic Movement. She made her studio debut in 2019 with the release of her single "Bad". In November 2022, she released her debut four-track EP, Entropy. In 2025, she received widespread recognition in the Indian film industry for her contribution to the film soundtracks of Lokah Chapter 1: Chandra, Dhurandhar and Dhurandhar: The Revenge.

== Early life and education ==
Daiaphi Lamare was born in Nangbah, West Jaintia Hills, Meghalaya. She grew up in an environment shaped by both Khasi and Pnar cultures. She went to an English-medium school, stating it limited her opportunity to formally learn Khasi, despite it being her mother tongue. She grew up across several places in Northeast India, including Guwahati, the Jaintia Hills region of Meghalaya, Bengaluru, and Shillong.

Lamare was first introduced to music when she was 4 or 5 years old, when she heard a melody on a telephone line. She started writing lyrics and rapping in 2012 when she was 10 years old, drawing on a range of influences including rock, hip hop and indie music.

In 2025, she completed her civil engineering course from Visvesvaraya Technological University in Bengaluru.

== Career ==
=== 2018–2022: Career beginnings, "Bad", and Entropy ===
Reble first appeared as "Daya" in 2018, collaborating with a local group, Symphonic Movement. At that time, she didn't want her family to find out that she was doing music. She recalls: "At the time, I didn't want my family to find out that I was doing music, so I decided to change my name. I genuinely thought that if I used a different name, they wouldn't figure it out".

I always hated being told what to do, that's it. I was just a kid, but rap was my outlet; hip-hop was my outlet; music in general was my outlet. I needed something for myself because I felt like I never fit in, and I didn't have much. When I discovered music and when I discovered hip-hop, I felt like I finally had something.

— Reble explaining the background of her stage name, "Reble"

In 2019, she chose her stage name, "Reble", which reflected her identification with rebellion. She explains that, "Reble" was a way for her to separate herself from expectation and associate herself with something different. She describes the beginning of her music career as rather unplanned. At home, she was pushed to do her conventional studies to complete her engineering degree. During those times, she balanced her studies alongside her musical career. She has said that the most challenging moments were when a performance and an examination fell on the same day, she told that she would choose the examination so as not to disappoint her mother.

In August 2019, Reble released her debut single "Bad" produced by D-Mon, from the Shillong hip-hop group Khasi Bloodz. The song was described as addressing personal and family-related experiences, including difficulties within her family, which she said influenced her decision to take up rap. She also credited D-Mon and Mix And Flow Productions for supporting and mentoring her during her early career. The same year, she released her second single "Believe".

In August 2021, Vogue India named Reble among eight emerging Indian women in hip-hop. Rolling Stone India featured her single "Talk of the Town" on their "The Best Indian Independent Singles of 2022". The track was a collaboration between Kbjj and Reble.

In November 2022, Reble released her debut EP, Entropy. According to Rolling Stone India, Entropy represented a shift from the gritty rap style associated with her earlier works towards a distinctive sound that incorporated melodic elements alongside rap and more introspective themes. The publication noted tracks such as "Changes" written from the perspective of her future self, and "Jane" which introduces an alter ego, as the standout tracks from the EP. The EP was released via Kamani Records and was accompanied by the music video for "Bond Fission". Entropy was her first solo project, and she received sponsorship from the music label Kamani.

=== 2023–present: "New Riot" and debut in Indian film industry ===
Reble's popularity grew with her singles like "Terror", "Set It Off", "Only Uparwala Can Judge Me" and "Killswitch – Red Bull 64 Bars", which were released during 2024–2025. Throughout 2024, she also appeared in multiple live concerts such as Bacardi NH7 Weekender, and Shillong Cherry Blossom Festival.

In April 2025, she was included on the second edition of Rolling Stone India's "Future of Music" list. In August, she contributed to her first film soundtrack in a Malayalam film, Lokah Chapter 1: Chandra. In an interview with Mathrubhumi, she expressed her desire to return to Malayalam film industry, stating, "I had the nicest people there, and Kochi felt like a different country". She described her experience to work with Jakes Bejoy as "amazing" and credited Bejoy as someone who gave her the freedom to understand the character in the film.

In October 2025, Reble released her single "New Riot", produced by Parimal Shais and guitarist Krishna M Sujith. It was released via the record label Homegrown Music, in collaboration with Atlantic Records. The song was described as a gritty blend of distorted synths and raw, unfiltered emotion with influences from phonk and Memphis rap. She performed the single at the first Indian edition of the hip-hop festival, Rolling Loud, which was held in Kharghar on 23 November. She described it as an anthem of rage, chaos, and release, she told, "Riot means saying, 'Fuck it'. It's about letting the anger and the frustration out. Society requires us to be functional and confined within its norms. But sometimes we just need to be human. Sometimes we need to break apart. Riot is my way of saying I've had enough. It's my rebellion against being normal". The song was also featured on the soundtrack of the American drama series Deli Boys. In November, she was also featured on the EP, Pursuetist House Vol.1, along with fellow indie artists like Dhanji, Sarah Black, Bharg and tricksingh.

In December 2025, Reble gained further mainstream recognition through her songs on the soundtrack of the film Dhurandhar, reaching listeners beyond the indie community. On the album, she appeared on three of the songs, including "Naal Nachna", "Run Down The City – Monica" (a remix of Asha Bhosle's "Piya Tu Ab To Aja") and "Move – Yeh Ishq Ishq" (a remix of Yeh Hai Ishq Ishq by Manna Dey and Mohammed Rafi). Speaking about Dhurandhar, she told Gulf News, "Dhurandhar was a very special project for me because it was my first time doing something within the Bollywood industry. It wasn't planned at all — it honestly came together at the last moment. Everything just happened very organically."

In February 2026, she was featured in GQ India, where she stated that she was working on a new project. In March, she appeared on the soundtrack of Dhurandhar: The Revenge where she is credited on four of the songs, including "Aari Aari", "Main Aur Tu", "Vaari Jaavan", and "Rang De Lal (Oye Oye)". In May 2026, Reble released the single, "Praying Mantis", accompanied by a music video, which was her first independent release of 2026. She subsequently released her second EP, 25 IN 26, in November 2026, which explored themes of childhood, ambition, complicated relationships and the politics of power and conformity. She is set to perform as a part of the lineup at the inaugural international edition of Hybe Weverse Con Festival in India in 2027.

== Artistry ==
=== Musical style ===
Reble's music has been labelled as hip-hop having elements from trap, hardcore, alternative, and R&B. Her lyrics has been described as edgy. Magazines like Femina have featured her music for its bold lyricism, cultural clarity that amplify the voices of the Northeast India. Music journalist Anurag Tagat said that her earlier works incorporated elements of soulful singing, whereas later singles such as "New Riot" (2025) were inspired by bands like Deftones. Her songs aim to create songs that connect with everyday struggle, dreams, and identify. A prominent theme in her work, she states, is identity rooted in lived experience: "the trauma, the instability, the feeling of never really belonging — that's what you hear in my music."

=== Influences ===
Reble has cited Eminem her biggest idol, stating she grew up listening to his music. She has also mentioned André 3000, The Notorious B.I.G., Tupac Shakur, Linkin Park, MGMT, and Pink Floyd as influences. Among Indian artists, she admires Hanumankind, Chaar Diwaari, and Yashraj. She also expressed her wish to collaborate with rappers like Tyler, the Creator, and G-Eazy.

== Public image ==
=== Social views ===
Reble disapproves of tokenism in rap culture, saying, "The only bit that grinds my gears is when festivals pretend to care about gender equality by tossing women on a lineup for appearances. I'm not filler, I'm a headliner." She is one of the few female rappers from the Northeast India. Speaking about her ethnic background, she said, "I think it's not really a stereotype - it is what it is. People recognise that you come from a particular ethnic group and that you look different, but there's no lie in that. You do come from a very different place, and you do look different, even if it's often framed as a stereotype. I think what one can do is take pride in it, and that makes a difference." She wants to inspire women into the Indian rap scene. She thinks people don't need to sexualise themselves in order to sell music:

I think there's a lot of room for improvement in the female rap scene. I don't believe anyone should be given importance just because they're men or women. You just need to make good music and let that speak for itself. If you look at things from a wider perspective, nobody talks about Nicki Minaj or Doechii in terms of gender, because they live up to the standard. They're good musicians, and it doesn't matter whether they're women or men— they make good music, and it speaks for itself.

Speaking about music labels to Elle India, Reble believes, "labels do not mean much nowadays since music is everywhere". She credits platforms like Instagram and TikTok for blowing up older music.

== Discography ==
=== Extended plays ===
Title	Details
Entropy	Released: 25 November 2022; Label: Kamani Records; Formats: Digital download, streaming
25 IN 26	Released: 12 November 2026; Label: Atlantic Records, Homegrown Records; Formats: Digital download, streaming

=== Singles ===
==== As lead artist ====
Title	Year	Album
"Bad"	2019	Non-album single
"Believe"	2019	Non-album single
"Manifest" (with Dappest)	2020	Non-album single
"Flove" (with Pezo Kronu)	2022	Non-album single
Gasoline (with B4NSHAN)	2022	Non-album single
"Opening Act"	2023	Non-album single
"Muse"	2023	Non-album single
"Terror"	2024	Non-album single
"Kill Switch (Red Bull 64 Bars)" (with Parimal Shais)	2024	Non-album single
"East India Cypher" (with Rapper Big Deal, Cizzy, Rahul Rajkhowa and G’nie)	2025	Non-album single
"Set It Off" (with Kim The Beloved)	2025	Non-album single
"Only Uparwala Can Judge Me" (with Dhanji and Clifr)	2025	Non-album single
"United by Hip Hop" (with Paal Dabba, Vichaar and 99side)	2025	Non-album single
"New Riot" (with Parimal Shais)	2025	25 IN 26
"Praying Mantis"	2026	25 IN 26

==== As featured artist ====
Title	Year	Album
"Bipolar" (B.A.D featuring Reble and VINCZ)	2022	Non-album single
"Talk of the Town" (BoomSpace featuring Reble and kbjj)	2022	Non-album single
"Bitch Please" (Rahul Rajkhowa featuring Reble)	2023	Non-album single
"Bediyan" (Rashmeet Kaur featuring Reble and Tracy De Sà)	2023	KAURA (Aura Of Kaur)
"Time Is Money" (Raj featuring Reble and Bebhumika)	2024	Non-album single
"For Life" (The Pursuetist House featuring Reble and Dishaan)	2025	The Pursuetist House Vol. 1

=== Film soundtracks ===
Key
†	Denotes films that have not yet been released

Year	Film	Language	Song	Music	Lyrics	Co-artist(s)	Ref.
2025	Lokah Chapter 1: Chandra	Malayalam	"Thani Lokah Murakkaari"	Jakes Bejoy	Mu.Ri	Jyoti Nooran	
2025	Dhurandhar	Hindi	"Run Down the City – Monica"	Shashwat Sachdev	Majrooh Sultanpuri, Reble	Asha Bhosle, R. D. Burman	
2025	Dhurandhar	Hindi	"Move – Yeh Ishq Ishq"	Shashwat Sachdev	Sahir Ludhianvi, Reble	Sonu Nigam	
2025	Dhurandhar	Hindi	"Naal Nachna"	Shashwat Sachdev	Irshad Kamil, Reble	Afsana Khan	
2026	Dhurandhar: The Revenge	Hindi	"Aari Aari"	Shashwat Sachdev	Irshad Kamil, Bombay Rockers, Reble, Token	Navtej Singh Rehal, Khaan Saab, Jasmine Sandlas, Sudhir Yaduvanshi, Token	
2026	Dhurandhar: The Revenge	Hindi	"Main Aur Tu"	Shashwat Sachdev	Jasmine Sandlas, Reble	Jasmine Sandlas, Shashwat Sachdev	
2026	Dhurandhar: The Revenge	Hindi	"Vaari Jaavan"	Shashwat Sachdev	Jasmine Sandlas, Reble	Jyoti Nooran	
2026	Dhurandhar: The Revenge	Hindi	"Rang De Lal (Oye Oye)"	Shashwat Sachdev, Kalyanji–Anandji	Jasmine Sandlas, Reble, Anand Bakshi	Jasmine Sandlas, Afsana Khan, Amit Kumar, Sapna Mukherjee	

== Accolades ==
Award	Year	Recipient(s) and nominee(s)	Category	Result	Ref
TIMD Awards (Note: TIMD Awards is an independent music award given by The Indian Music Diaries.)	2024	Reble	Best Emerging Hip-Hop Artist of the Year	Won	
CNN-News18 Indian of the Year	2026	Reble	Youth Icon	Won	
