= Didar Sandhu =

- Born: Didar Singh Sandhu; July 3, 1942; Chakk no. 133, (Sargodha district) Punjab, British India
- Origin: Bharowal Khurd ( Ludhiana district), East Punjab
- Died: February 16, 1991 (aged 48) Ludhiana
- Genres: Folk, Duets
- Occupation: Singer-songwriter
- Instrument: Tumbi
- Years active: 1962–1991
- Label: His Master's Voice
- Website: Facebook page = https://www.facebook.com/didar.nama

Didar Sandhu was a noted Punjabi folk singer and songwriter from Punjab, India. He used to tie a turban on stage. He mostly sang duets with various noted Punjabi singers like Surinder Kaur and Amar Noorie.

Didar Sandhu fell ill due to alcohol consumption and was admitted to DMC hospital in Ludhiana in 1991 where he died on February 16.

== Early life ==
Sandhu was born July 3, 1942, to father S. Sardar Samund Singh and mother Daan Kaur, in the village of Chakk no. 133 in Sillanwali tehsil of Sargodha District in British Punjab. He was the youngest of five brothers. In 1947, due to partition the family moved to the Bodalwala village of Jagraon tehsil in East Punjab and later in 1956, settled in the Bharowal Khurd village of Ludhiana district.

In 1966, Didar married to Amarjeet Kaur of village Ghalib Kalan and couple had two children. Didar's son Jagmohan Sandhu is also a singer.

He also served as the Sarpanch of his village Bharowal Khurd, near Mullanpur Dakha in Ludhiana district, for fifteen years.

== Career ==
=== As songwriter ===
Sandhu was very fond of poetry from his early age and started writing poetry in his school days. Didar's first song jatt barha bedardi was sung by Narinder Biba. In 1962, he was employed by Punjab Govt. where he met Mohd. Sadiq (a Punjabi singer) at a theatre company which did Punjabi dramas in early 1960s and both became very good friends. Most of his early songs were recorded in the voice of Narinder Biba and Mohd. Sadiq. He was noted for his song "meri aisi jhanjar chhanke, chhankata painda gali gali"', sung by Mohd. Sadiq, gave him a very distinct identity in Punjabi music. His first song recorde as singer was pind dean mundean nu sanu vekh neend na aave with female singer Saneh Lata.

Sandhu has penned many songs for many noted Punjabi singers like Mohammad Sadiq & Ranjit Kaur, Narinder Biba & Beer Chand, Surinder Kaur & Ramesh Rangila, Surinder Kaur & Sabur Hussain, Sudesh Kapoor & Surinder Kaur, Promila Pammi & Ramesh Rangila, Karnail Gill & Swaran Lata, Karnail Gill & Preeti Bala etc.

=== Singing ===
He was noted duet singer of his era. During his career, Didar sung with many noted Punjabi female singers of his time and recorded many duets with singers including Saneh Lata (who, later, married overseas and left her singing career), Kuldeep Kaur, Parminder Sandhu, Baljit Balli in the 1980s. In 1980–82, he recorded about 20 songs with "Punjab Di Koel" (Nightingale of Punjab) Surinder Kaur. A film heroine, Rama Vij, also performed on stages with him. In 1981, Amar Noori started singing with him at a very early age and did it for a long time. An akhara of Sandhu and Noorie was also filmed for a Punjabi film, Gabhroo Punjab Da (1986).

Noted songs

- phatak Kotkapure da
- na maar zaalma ve, peke tattri de door
- mera joban peeta
- meri mahi-mahi kehndi di zuban sukk gayi
- na kar mainu pyar (jad main doli charhgi)
- jorhi jadon chubare charhdi
- jal te phull tarda (boliyan)

== See also ==
- Tumbi – a music instrument
- Kuldeep Manak
- Amar Singh Chamkila
- Lal Chand Yamla Jatt
- List of Punjabi singers
