= Kick (soundtrack) =

- Soundtrack album cover

Soundtrack album by Himesh Reshammiya, Meet Bros. Anjjan and Yo Yo Honey Singh
- Released: 7 July 2014
- Genre: Feature film soundtrack
- Length: 1:12:04
- Label: T-Series
External audio
- Audio Jukebox – Part 1 on YouTube
- Audio Jukebox – Part 2 on YouTube

Himesh Reshammiya chronology
Humshakals (2014)	Kick (2014)	Action Jackson (2014)

Meet Bros. Anjjan chronology
Hate Story 2 (2014)	Kick (2014)	Singham Returns (2014)

Yo Yo Honey Singh chronology
Fugly (2014)	Kick (2014)	Singham Returns (2014)

Kick is the soundtrack to the 2014 film of the same name directed and produced by Sajid Nadiadwala (in his directorial debut). An adaptation of the eponymous 2009 Telugu film, it stars Salman Khan, Jacqueline Fernandez, Randeep Hooda and Nawazuddin Siddiqui. The soundtrack features 18 songs, with five original tracks curated by Himesh Reshammiya, Meet Bros. Anjjan and Yo Yo Honey Singh and written by Kumaar, Shabbir Ahmed, Mayur Puri, Yo Yo Honey Singh and Jasmine Sandlas. The remainder is accompanied by remixes and alternate versions of those original tracks. T-Series released the soundtrack album on 7 July 2014.

== Background and release ==
Kick marked Khan's return to playback singing after 25 years; his previous stint as a singer was for the song "Chandi Ki Daal Par" from Hello Brother (1999). The first song "Jumme Ki Raat" performed by Mika Singh and Palak Muchhal was released on 6 June 2014, as it coincided with Jummah, an auspicious day for Muslims.

The second song "Hangover" was released on 12 June 2014. The track was sung by Khan himself with Shreya Ghoshal, and rap verses by Meet Bros. Anjjan who also composed the track. Manmeet of the Meet Bros duo said that Khan's voice felt apt for the track, after they could not find suitable singers. However, Sonu Nigam earlier performed the track in late-November, but his vocals were scrapped with Khan performing the track. A source close to the production said that Nadiadwala approached Sonu to perform the track and did not receive any remuneration as he sang for Khan in his previous films. But due to undisclosed reasons, his version was not included.

Sajid Nadiadwala bought the rights for the song "Saat Samundar Par" from the film Vishwatma (1992). It was a tribute to Sajid's first late wife and Bollywood actress Divya Bharti, on whom the song was picturized on. Since this was his first film he directed, he wanted to pay a tribute to his late wife Divya, and wanted her to be part of it. Salman Khan danced to the song "Saat Samundar Par" as a tribute to Bharti.

The soundtrack was released by T-Series on 7 July 2014 as a single album in music streaming platforms, and as a two-part jukebox in YouTube.

== Track listing ==
No.	Title	Lyrics	Music	Singer(s)	Length
1.	"Jumme Ki Raat"	Kumaar, Shabbir Ahmed	Himesh Reshammiya	Mika Singh, Palak Muchhal	4:34
2.	"Hangover"	Kumaar	Meet Bros. Anjjan	Salman Khan, Shreya Ghoshal, Meet Bros. Anjjan	6:16
3.	"Tu Hi Tu"	Mayur Puri	Himesh Reshammiya	Mohammad Irfan	5:30
4.	"Yaar Naa Miley"	Yo Yo Honey Singh, Jasmine Sandlas	Yo Yo Honey Singh	Yo Yo Honey Singh, Jasmine Sandlas	4:03
5.	"Hai Yehi Zindagi"	Kumaar	Meet Bros. Anjjan	Dev Negi	3:16
6.	"Jumme Ki Raat" (Version 2)	Kumaar, Shabbir Ahmed	Himesh Reshammiya	Salman Khan, Palak Muchhal	4:34
7.	"Tu Hi Tu" (Reprise)	Mayur Puri	Himesh Reshammiya	Neeti Mohan	5:30
8.	"Hangover" (MBA Swag)	Kumaar	Meet Bros. Anjjan	Meet Bros. Anjjan, DJ Sumit Sethi & Prince	3:04
9.	"Tu Hi Tu" (Version 2)	Mayur Puri	Himesh Reshammiya	Salman Khan	5:30
10.	"Jumme Ki Raat" (Remix by DJ Kiran Kamath)	Kumaar, Shabbir Ahmed	Himesh Reshammiya	Mika Singh, Palak Muchhal	3:20
11.	"Hangover" (Remix by Meet Bros Anjjan)	Kumaar	Meet Bros. Anjjan	Salman Khan, Shreya Ghoshal, Meet Bros. Anjjan, A Positive Dhillon	4:14
12.	"Tu Hi Tu" (Remix by DJ Kiran Kamath)	Mayur Puri	Himesh Reshammiya	Mohammad Irfan Ali	4:17
13.	"Jumme Ki Raat" (Version 2) (Remix by DJ Kiran Kamath))	Kumaar, Shabbir Ahmed	Himesh Reshammiya	Salman Khan, Palak Muchhal	3:20
14.	"Tu Hi Tu" (House Mix by DJ Kiran Kamath)	Mayur Puri	Himesh Reshammiya	Neeti Mohan	4:07
15.	"Tu Hi Tu" (Version 2) (Remix by DJ Kiran Kamath))	Mayur Puri	Himesh Reshammiya	Salman Khan	4:08
16.	"Hai Yehi Zindagi" (Version 2)	Kumaar	Meet Bros. Anjjan	Mohammad Irfan Ali	3:16
17.	"Hai Yehi Zindagi" (Version 3)	Kumaar	Meet Bros. Anjjan	Salman Khan	3:16
18.	"Yaar Naa Miley" (Remix by Yo Yo Honey Singh)	Yo Yo Honey Singh, Jasmine Sandlas	Yo Yo Honey Singh	Yo Yo Honey Singh, Jasmine Sandlas	4:06
Total length:					1:12:04

== Reception ==
Rajiv Vijayakar of Bollywood Hungama called the album as an "outright winner". Devesh Sharma of Filmfare called it as "a short and peppy album, which will perk you up for a little while" giving 3.5 (out of 5). Nishevitha Vijayanand of Rediff.com said that "the soundtrack of Kick is total paisa vasool for Salman Khan's fans" and rated 3 (out of 5). Sankhayan Ghosh of The Indian Express wrote "Kick is actually better than last few film albums of Khan, its two dance numbers being its highpoint."

== Accolades ==
Award	Date of ceremony (Note: Date is linked to the article about the awards held that year, wherever possible.)	Category	Recipient(s) and nominee(s)	Result	Ref.
Bollywood Hungama Surfers Choice Music Awards	14 January 2015	Best Soundtrack	Kick – Himesh Reshammiya, Meet Bros. Anjjan and Yo Yo Honey Singh	Nominated	
Bollywood Hungama Surfers Choice Music Awards	14 January 2015	Best Song	"Jumme Ki Raat" – Himesh Reshammiya (composer), Kumaar, Shabbir Ahmed (lyricists), Mika Singh, Palak Muchhal (singers)	Nominated	
Bollywood Hungama Surfers Choice Music Awards	14 January 2015	Best Lyricist	Kumaar – ("Hangover")	Nominated	
Bollywood Hungama Surfers Choice Music Awards	14 January 2015	Best Female Playback Singer	Shreya Ghoshal – ("Hangover")	Nominated	
Mirchi Music Awards	27 February 2015	Upcoming Female Vocalist of The Year	Jasmine Sandlas – ("Yaar Naa Miley")	Won	
Screen Awards	14 January 2015	Best Music Director	Himesh Reshammiya, Meet Bros. Anjjan and Yo Yo Honey Singh	Won	
Filmfare Awards	31 January 2015	Best Music Director	Himesh Reshammiya, Meet Bros. Anjjan and Yo Yo Honey Singh	Nominated	
IIFA Awards	5–7 June 2015	Best Male Playback Singer	Mika Singh for "Jumme Ki Raat"	Nominated	
IIFA Awards	5–7 June 2015	Best Choreography	Ahmed Khan for "Jumme Ki Raat"	Won	
