= Muhammad Sadiq (singer) =

Punjabi singer, actor and politician

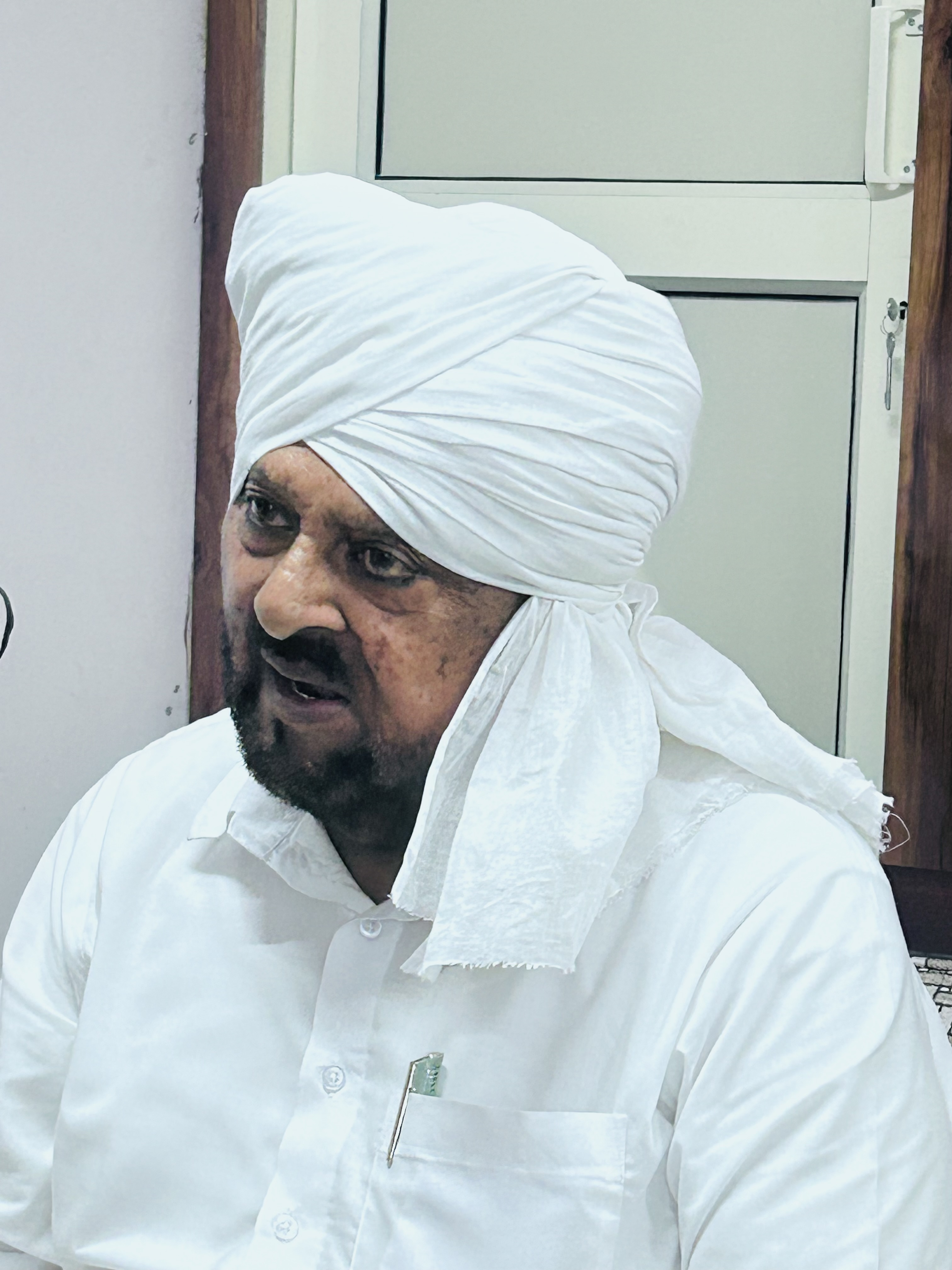
- Muhammad Sadiq at Punjab language department in May 2025

Member of Parliament, Lok Sabha
- In office 18 June 2019 – 4 June 2024
- Preceded by: Sadhu Singh
- Succeeded by: Sarabjeet Singh Khalsa
- Constituency: Faridkot

Member of the Punjab Legislative Assembly
- In office 2012–2017
- Preceded by: Balvir Singh Ghunas
- Succeeded by: Pirmal Singh Dhaula
- Constituency: Bhadaur

Personal details
- Born: Kup Kalan, Punjab province, British India (now Malerkotla district), Punjab, India
- Party: Indian National Congress
- Profession: Singer
- Musical career
- Also known as: Sadiq, Sadeeq
- Genres: Folk, Duets
- Occupations: Singer, actor, politician and composer
- Instrument: Tumbi

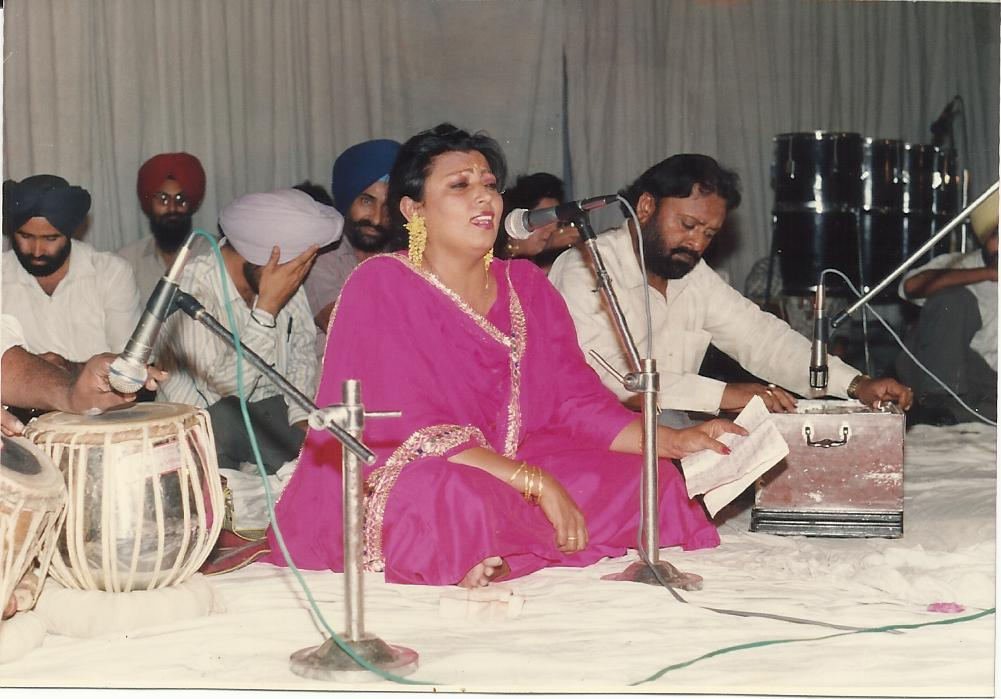
Muhammad Sadiq plays harmonium with Ranjit Kaur, his singing companion.

Muhammad Sadiq is a Punjabi-language singer, actor and politician from India. He is best known for his duets with singer Ranjit Kaur. He is the ex Member of Parliament, Lok Sabha for Faridkot, Punjab constituency. He was the Congress party MLA from Bhadaur in Punjab from 2012 to 2017.

== Early life ==
Sadiq was born in 1939 in a Punjabi Muslim family, to father Walayat Ali and mother Parsinni, in the village of Kup Kalan, Punjab Province, British Raj (now in Malerkotla district, Punjab, India). According to him, he belongs to Doom caste (a Marasi sub-caste). His uncle was a folk singer who inspired him a lot.

== Career ==
He has sung with many female singers of Punjab including Surinder Kaur, Narinder Biba, Rajinder Rajan, Swaran Lata & many others including a duo with Ranjit Kaur. Most of his songs been written by famous Punjabi folk lyricist Babu Singh Maan. In his starting career he sang songs written by Inderjeet Hasanpuri & his friend Didar Sandhu. He recorded most of his songs & live performances with Ranjit Kaur for approximately 40 years. They were one of the most famous singing couples of Punjab in the 1970s and '80s. He first sang the famous folk song "Nigah Maarda Aayin Ve Mera Laung Gawacha" as duet with Bibi Surinder Kaur in late 60s written by lyricist Babu Singh Maan. Many of Punjabi singers have re-recorded his songs such as Na De Dil Pardesi Nu, Lammi Seeti Maar Mittra, Mera Laung Gawacha and Boliyaan. He also acted in few Punjabi films like Putt Jattan De, Guddo, Patola, Jatt Jeona Morh and Tabaahi.

== Politics ==
He contested from Bhadaur constituency in 2012 assembly elections as candidate of Congress and won defeating Darbara Singh Guru of Shiromani Akali Dal. His election was challenged by the defeated Akali candidate Guru on the grounds that he is a Muslim and thus does not belong to a scheduled caste making him ineligible to contest from a reserved seat. While the Punjab and Haryana High Court quashed his election, the Supreme Court, on his appeal, has stayed the HC order. In 2017 assembly elections, he contested from Jaito constituency as candidate of Congress and lost against Master Baldev Singh of Aam Aadmi Party. He won 2019 Indian general election from Faridkot Lok Sabha constituency.

== Family ==
He has six daughters, all of them married. He has 5 grandsons and 3 granddaughters. In 2012, Sadiq revealed that he was brought up in a non-practicing Muslim family, and he converted to Sikhism in 2006.

== Filmography ==
- Kulli Yaar Di (1970) ...
- Saidan Jogan (1979) ... Goga
- Rano ... Kanwar Harphool Singh
- Putt Jattan De (1983) ... Jabar Jang Singh
- Guddo (1985) ... Mangal/Jawala (Double Role)
- Patola (1988) ... Kishna Kautki
- Jatt Jeona Mour (1991) ... Daaku Chatraa
- Zakhmi (1996) ... Thanedaar Rachhpal Singh
- Tabaahi (1996) ... Thanedaar Seva Singh
- Laali (1998)
- Kaun Kise Da Beli (2007) ... Sohan
- Jatt Boys - Putt Jattan De (2013) ... Jassa
- Dulla Vaily (2019) ... Gheela

== Famous songs ==
- Baggi Titri Kamaadon Nikli
- Mitran di Khang wich Khang Balliye
- Aa Mundey Ve Zara Beh Mundeya
- Na De Dil Pardesi Nu (Remixed by Panjabi MC as "Jogi" and Shashwat Sachdev as "Sound of Dhurandhar")
- 100 da note
- Mera Laung Gawacha
- Haase Naal Si Chalawan Phull Mareya
- Je Mundeya Teri Akh Ve Dukhdi
- Khich Lai Vairiya
- Kurti Malmal Di
- Lammi Seeti Maar Mittra
- La La Hogayi (Sucha Soorma)
- Jatti Mili Jatt Nu
- Solvin ch Deor Parda
- Patt ditti Gutt
- Malki Keema
- Yaar Bimar Peya
- Saari Saari Raat Pardi
- Aavan gi jaror Mitra
- Telu Raam di Hatti da Zarda
- Mukk gayi Feem
- Billo Teri Hikk
- Roadways di Laari
- Sohreya da Pind
- Umar Munde di Niani

== See also ==
- Didar Sandhu
- Babu Singh Maan
- Surinder Shinda
- Gurmel Singh Dhillon
- Kuldeep Manak
- Amar Singh Chamkila
- Gurcharan Pohli

Lok Sabha
Preceded by Sadhu Singh	Member of Parliament in Lok Sabha for Faridkot, Punjab; 2019 – 2024	Succeeded by Sarabjeet Singh Khalsa
