= Marahar =

Village in Faridkot, Punjab, India

Marahar ਮਰਾੜ੍ਹ
- Village
- Interactive map of Marahar
- Coordinates: 30.70873727636878°N 74.53190446954403°E
- Country: India
- State: Punjab
- District: Faridkot

Government
  - Type: Sarpanch
  - Body: Gram panchayat

Population (2011)
  - Total: 1,892

Languages
  - Official: Punjabi
- Time zone: UTC+5:30 (IST)
- Postal code: 151203
- Vehicle registration: PB04
- Nearest city: Faridkot

Marahar (Punjabi: ਮਰਾੜ੍ਹ) is a village located in Faridkot district of Punjab State. The Village has a population of 1892 of which 990 are males while 902 are females as per the population census of 2011. The total geographical area of the village is about 1,362 hectares (59.47 km^{2}).

== Notable people ==
- Babu SIngh Maan
