= Shashwat Sachdev =

Indian music composer

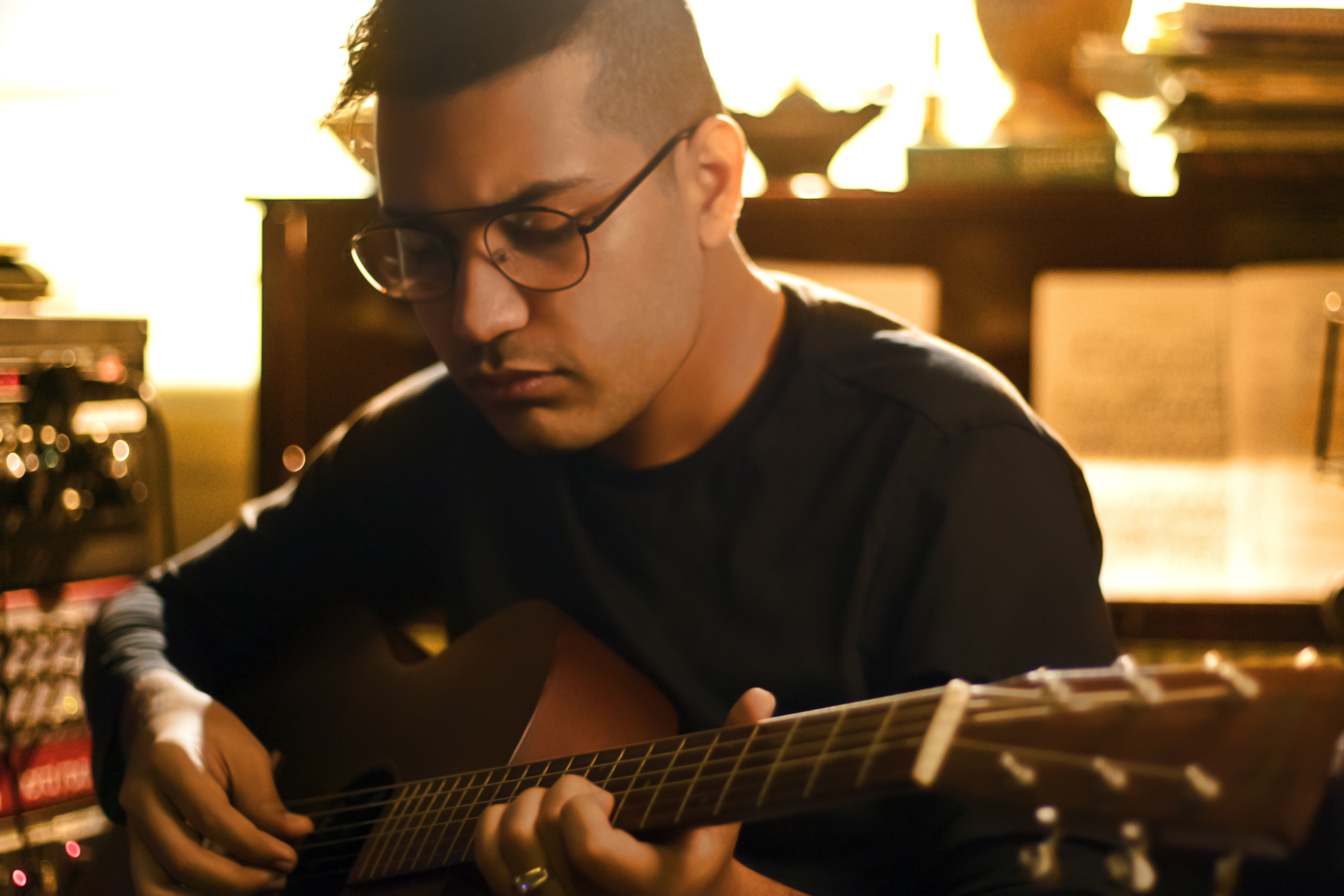
- Sachdev in 2016
- Born: Shashwat Sachdev; 1 January 1987 (age 39); Jaipur, Rajasthan
- Education: Symbiosis Law School, Pune
- Occupations: Music Composer, music producer, sound designer
- Years active: 2017–present
- Awards: National Film Awards, Filmfare Award, IIFA Award

Shashwat Sachdev (born January 1, 1987) is an Indian music composer, producer, and sound designer known for his work in Hindi cinema. He won the Best Background Music in the 66th National Film Awards for his score in Uri: The Surgical Strike (2019) and also won for Best Music Direction in 72th National Film Award for his song in Article 370 (2024). He also won the 65th Filmfare R. D. Burman Award for best new and upcoming talent. Subsequently, he received acclaim for his contributions to the soundtracks of Dhurandhar (2025) and Dhurandhar: The Revenge (2026).

== Early life and education ==
Sachdev was born in Jaipur, Rajasthan, where his father is a doctor while his mother, is a Philosophy lecturer at the Amity University, Jaipur, who had studied music. He started learning music when he was three years old, beginning with tabla for six months, followed by Hindustani classical vocals under Ustad Ramzan Khan, a sarangi exponent of the Sikar gharana for many years. He then went on to train in the Western classical piano during his school days. He studied law at Symbiosis Law School, Pune for 5 years, before moving to Hollywood, Los Angeles in 2011 to start his career in music.

== Career ==
Shashwat started his career in 2011 in Hollywood, Los Angeles working on numerous projects before moving to India in 2016.

In 2017, he was chosen as the music composer for Phillauri, which starred Anushka Sharma and Diljit Dosanjh.

In 2018, he composed four songs for Veere Di Wedding, a Bollywood female buddy comedy film, directed by Shashanka Ghosh. The film starred Kareena Kapoor Khan, Sonam Kapoor Ahuja, Swara Bhaskar and Shikha Talsania. In the same year, he scored for Selection Day, an Indian Netflix Original sports web television series, based on Aravind Adiga's 2016 novel of the same name. It was produced by Anil Kapoor and Anand Tucker.

In 2019, he composed the music as well as the background score for Uri: The Surgical Strike, an Indian action film written and directed by debutant Aditya Dhar, and produced by Ronnie Screwvala under his banner RSVP Movies. The film, starring Vicky Kaushal, is based on the 2016 Indian Army's surgical strikes on PoK in retaliation for the Uri attack. The film's music received rave reviews. His background score was also appreciated and released separately on popular demand. Shashwat won the award for Best Background Music at the 66th National Film Awards and the IIFA Award for Best Background Score at the 21st IIFA Awards for Uri: The Surgical Strike. He also won the 65th Filmfare R.D. Burman Award for Best New and Upcoming Talent.

In 2021, he released a production album titled Euphoria (And the Following Realities) under Extreme Music. The track "Dharma", from the album, won Best World Production Music 2021 and Shashwat himself won PRS Foundation The Best Newcomer 2021 in the Production Music Awards 2021 held in London on 12 December 2021.

In 2022, he worked on the soundtrack of the film Attack: Part 1, an Indian Hindi-language superhero film directed and co-written by Lakshya Raj Anand. The film produced by Jayantilal Gada, John Abraham and Ajay Kapoor, starred John Abraham alongside Jacqueline Fernandez and Rakul Preet Singh.And this year he also released his album Shades of Cashmere on 15 March 2022 under Extreme Music.

Shashwat, released independent music with a new label called IndieA Records launched in India with the intention to nurture and promote independent artists backed by Universal Music India. He dropped his first piece of music with them called "Awaara Ho".

2024 saw his work on the soundtrack for the film Article 370, a political action thriller film directed by Aditya Suhas Jambhale, who co-wrote the film with Aditya Dhar, Arjun Dhawan, and Monal Thaakar. Produced by Jyoti Deshpande, Aditya Dhar, and Lokesh Dhar, the film stars Yami Gautam, Priyamani, Skand Thakur, Ashwini Kaul, Vaibhav Tatwawadi, Arun Govil, and Kiran Karmarkar in pivotal roles. In the same year, he composed a song for the film Kill and composed the soundtrack for the film Ulajh.

Shashwat worked as a featured artist on Hans Zimmer and James Everingham's score for the 2025 BBC crime thriller Virdee, based on AA Dhand's much-loved novels. The six-part series was adapted for the screen by AA Dhand and was produced by Magical Society for BBC One and BBC iPlayer. In August 2025, he composed the soundtrack for web series The Ba***ds of Bollywood.

In December 2025, he worked on the soundtrack of the film Dhurandhar. His second collaboration with Aditya Dhar, after Uri: The Surgical Strike, it received widespread acclaim, with its modern reinterpretations of nostalgic source material, and contributions from Hanumankind, Reble, Diljit Dosanjh, Simran Choudhary, Arijit Singh, Jubin Nautiyal and Jasmine Sandlas among others, being highlighted as the main reason for its success. India Today praised the creative reworking of retro melodies, calling the result "fresh, exciting, and tightly woven" into the film's contemporary action drama, resonating with audiences across generations.

He also composed the soundtrack for its 2026 sequel, Dhurandhar: The Revenge. While publications like The Week praised the inclusion of retro iconic tracks in the soundtrack, and said that "the overall soundtrack is just a notch below the former one", others like mint, described it as being "darker, grittier and heavier than the former".

He is now set to compose the soundtrack for the Ram Charan production The Indian House, and the Mohanlal starrer Operation Ganga.

== Discography ==
=== As composer ===
Year	Film	Lyricist(s)	Notes
2017	Phillauri	Anvita Dutt Guptan	All songs except "Din Shagna Da" and "What's Up"
2018	Kaalakaandi	Anvita Dutt Guptan	Composed title song
2018	Veere Di Wedding	Raj Shekhar, Shashwat Sachdev, Shellee, Gaurav Solanki	Composed four songs
2018	Selection Day		
2019	Uri: The Surgical Strike	Kumaar	
2022	Attack: Part 1	Kumaar, Girish Nakod	
2023	Tejas	Kumaar	
2024	Big Girls Don't Cry	Shashwat Sachdev	Composed one song
2024	Article 370	Osho Jain, Sudhanshu Saria, Kumaar, Shashwat Sachdev	
2024	Kill	Shashwat Sachdev, Sidhant Kaushal, Shekhar Astitwa	Composed one song
2024	Ulajh	Kumaar, Jasmine Sandlas, Sudhanshu Saria	
2025	Kesari Chapter 2	Irshad Kamil, Sukhwinder Amrit	All songs except for "Khumaari"; one remake
2025	The Ba***ds of Bollywood	Kumaar, Jasmine Sandlas, Akshat Verma, Vishal Dadlani, Raja Kumari, Aryan Khan, Karan Aujla, Shashwat Sachdev	Composed nine songs
2025	Dhurandhar	Irshad Kamil, Reble, Simran Choudhary, Jasmine Sandlas, Raj Ranjodh, Hanumankind	Four remakes and one folk adaptation
2026	Dhurandhar: The Revenge	Irshad Kamil, Kumaar, Reble, Token, Satinder Sartaaj, Jasmine Sandlas, Qveen Herby	Five remakes
2026	The Indian House †		Telugu film
2027	Operation Ganga †		Malayalam film

==== Original scores ====
Year	Film
2018	Selection Day
2019	Uri: The Surgical Strike
2022	Attack: Part 1
2023	Tejas
2024	Article 370
2024	Ulajh
2025	Kesari Chapter 2
2025	The Ba***ds of Bollywood
2025	Dhurandhar
2026	Dhurandhar: The Revenge
2026	The Indian House †
2027	Operation Ganga †

==== As a playback singer ====
Year	Film	Song	Lyrics	Co-artist
2026	Dhurandhar: The Revenge	"Aari Aari"	Irshad Kamil, Bombay Rockers, Reble, Token	Navtej Singh Rehal (Bombay Rockers), Khan Saab, Jasmine Sandlas, Sudhir Yaduvanshi, Reble, Token
2026	Dhurandhar: The Revenge	"Main Aur Tu"	Jasmine Sandlas, Reble	Jasmine Sandlas, Reble
2026	Dhurandhar: The Revenge	"Jaan Se Guzarte Hain"	Irshad Kamil, Iqbal Safipuri, Nusrat Fateh Ali Khan	Khan Saab
2026	Dhurandhar: The Revenge	"Wild Ride"	Ellisar	Ellisar
2026	Dhurandhar: The Revenge	"Didi (Sher-e-Baloch)"	Sons of Yusuf, Khaled	Nabil El Houri, Sons of Yusuf
2026	Dhurandhar: The Revenge	"Destiny – Mann Atkeya"	Token, Shah Hussain	Vaibhav Gupta, Shahzad Ali, Token

=== Independent work ===
Year	Title	Singer(s)	Lyricist(s)	Composer(s)	Label
2019	Kahaniya	Madhubanti Bagchi	Shashwat Sachdev	Shashwat Sachdev "Himself"	Independent
2020	Maan Ja	Himself	Shashwat Sachdev	Shashwat Sachdev "Himself"	Independent
2020	Roko Na	Himself	Shashwat Sachdev	Shashwat Sachdev "Himself"	Independent
2021	Machlo	Romy	Kumaar	Shashwat Sachdev "Himself"	Malsons
2021	Sha - Dobara	Shreya Jain	Shashwat Sachdev	Shashwat Sachdev "Himself"	Malsons
2021	Meri Jaan	Jubin Nautiyal	Raj Shekhar	Shashwat Sachdev "Himself"	Malsons
2021	Tenu Vekhan Da	Shirley Setia, Romy	Kumaar	Shashwat Sachdev "Himself"	Malsons
2021	Sha - O Jaana	Himself	Shashwat Sachdev	Shashwat Sachdev "Himself"	Malsons
2022	Awaara Ho	Himself	Shashwat Sachdev	Shashwat Sachdev "Himself"	IndieA Records - UMG
2022	Baaton Baaton Main	Anumita Nadesan	Shashwat Sachdev	Shashwat Sachdev "Himself"	IndieA Records - UMG
2022	Paris London Amsterdam	Aanchal Tyagi	Shashwat Sachdev	Shashwat Sachdev "Himself"	IndieA Records - UMG
2022	Ek Ghar	Himself	Shashwat Sachdev	Shashwat Sachdev "Himself"	IndieA Records - UMG
2022	Awaara Ho - Dream Pop	Shilpa Rao	Shashwat Sachdev	Shashwat Sachdev "Himself"	IndieA Records - UMG
2022	Nazdeek Aa	Himself	Shashwat Sachdev	Shashwat Sachdev "Himself"	IndieA Records - UMG
2023	Tumhe Na Chahne Ko	Himself	Shashwat Sachdev	Shashwat Sachdev "Himself"	IndieA Records - UMG
2023	Kaisi Jadugari	Prateek Kuhad	Shashwat Sachdev	Shashwat Sachdev "Himself"	IndieA Records - UMG
2024	Leta Jaijo Re	Himself, Sunidhi Chauhan, Chotu Khan	Folk lyrics, (Additional lyrics by Kausar Munir)	Shashwat Sachdev "Himself"	Universal Music India

=== Albums ===
Year	Album	Track(s)	Label
2021	Euphoria (And the Following Realities)	The New Karma	Extreme Music
2021	Euphoria (And the Following Realities)	Euphoria (Kaala Doriya)	Extreme Music
2021	Euphoria (And the Following Realities)	Seeking Rapture	Extreme Music
2021	Euphoria (And the Following Realities)	Blade	Extreme Music
2021	Euphoria (And the Following Realities)	Delirious	Extreme Music
2021	Euphoria (And the Following Realities)	Conqueror (Jugni)	Extreme Music
2021	Euphoria (And the Following Realities)	Ecstacy (Ant Bahar)	Extreme Music
2021	Euphoria (And the Following Realities)	Dharma	Extreme Music
2021	Euphoria (And the Following Realities)	Bliss (Ahir Bhairav)	Extreme Music
2021	Euphoria (And the Following Realities)	Brahman	Extreme Music
2021	Euphoria (And the Following Realities)	Maya	Extreme Music
2021	Euphoria (And the Following Realities)	Climax	Extreme Music
2022	Shades of Cashmere	Blessing the Bride (Bai Sa)	Extreme Music
2022	Shades of Cashmere	Lone Poet (Aeri Aali)	Extreme Music
2022	Shades of Cashmere	Blissful Homecoming (Jhir Mir)	Extreme Music
2022	Shades of Cashmere	Rain Dance (Barsan Laagi)	Extreme Music
2022	Shades of Cashmere	Sweet Stranger (Mithiyan Mehman)	Extreme Music
2022	Shades of Cashmere	Love and Cloudburst (Baucharan)	Extreme Music
2022	Shades of Cashmere	Bittersweet Farewell (Jalalo Bilalo)	Extreme Music
2022	Shades of Cashmere	The Circle of Life (Madhaniyan)	Extreme Music
2022	Shades of Cashmere	A Life Worth Living (Kesariyo)	Extreme Music
2022	Shades of Cashmere	Greatest Happiness (Aj Din Shagna Da)	Extreme Music
2023	Sha	Baaton Baaton Main	IndieA Records - UMG
2023	Sha	Awaara Ho	IndieA Records - UMG
2023	Sha	Tumhe Na Chahne Ko	IndieA Records - UMG
2023	Sha	Paris London Amstredam	IndieA Records - UMG
2023	Sha	Nazdeek Aa	IndieA Records - UMG
2023	Sha	Ek Ghar	IndieA Records - UMG
2023	Sha	Awaara Ho - Dream Pop	IndieA Records - UMG
2023	Sha	Kaisi Jadugari	IndieA Records - UMG
2025	The Indian Odyssey	Akashic Tapestry-Zardozi	Extreme Music
2025	The Indian Odyssey	Liquid Light-Chaand Raat	Extreme Music
2025	The Indian Odyssey	Dark Matter Symphony-Challa Beri	Extreme Music
2025	The Indian Odyssey	Lotus Voyager-Hothop Pe Ishq	Extreme Music
2025	The Indian Odyssey	Astral Strom-Khwaabon Ka Dariya	Extreme Music
2025	The Indian Odyssey	Timeless Now-Piya Ka Najariya	Extreme Music
2025	The Indian Odyssey	Cosmic Resonance-Piya Mora Pardes	Extreme Music
2025	The Indian Odyssey	Becoming Light-Sau Rang	Extreme Music
2025	The Indian Odyssey	Loops Of Infinity-Kangana	Extreme Music

== Awards and nominations ==
Film	Award	Category	Result	Ref.
Phillauri	10th Mirchi Music Awards	Upcoming Music Composer of The Year for "Bajaake Tumba"	Nominated	
Phillauri	10th Mirchi Music Awards	Upcoming Music Composer of The Year for "Sahiba"	Nominated	
Phillauri	10th Mirchi Music Awards	Best Song Engineer (Recording & Mixing) for "Naughty Billo"	Nominated	
Uri: The Surgical Strike	66th National Film Awards	National Film Award for Best Music Direction	Won	
Uri: The Surgical Strike	65th Filmfare Awards	Best Background Score	Nominated	
Uri: The Surgical Strike	65th Filmfare Awards	R. D. Burman Award	Won	
Uri: The Surgical Strike	21st IIFA Awards	Best Background Score	Won	
Euphoria (And The Following Realities)	The Production Music Awards 2021	Best World Music for "Bliss"	Nominated	
Euphoria (And The Following Realities)	The Production Music Awards 2021	Best World Music for "Dharma"	Won	
Euphoria (And The Following Realities)	The Production Music Awards 2021	PRS Foundation Best Newcomer	Won	
Article 370	72nd National Film Awards	Best Music Direction	Won	
Dhurandhar	Screen Awards	Best Background Score	Won	
Dhurandhar	Indian National Cine Academy Awards	Best Background Score	Won	
