= Lal Chand Yamla Jatt =

Indian singer

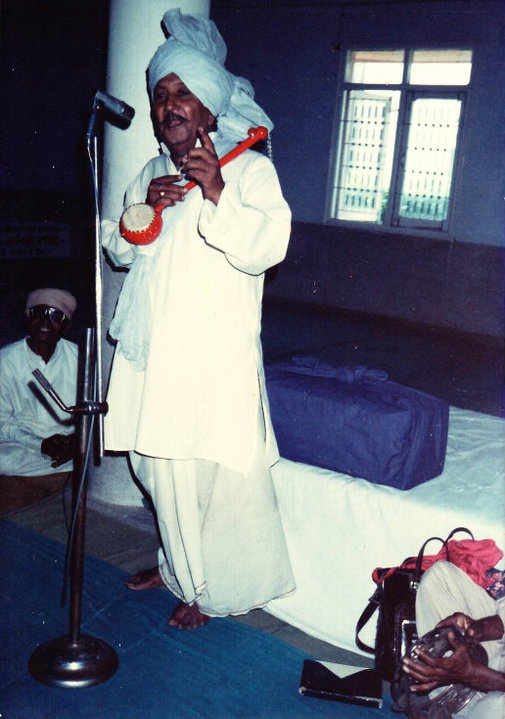

Background information
- Also known as: Yamla Jatt
- Born: 28 March 1910; Chak No. 384, Punjab Province, British India (now in Punjab, Pakistan)
- Died: 20 December 1991 (aged 81) Ludhiana, Punjab, India
- Genres: Punjabi folk
- Occupations: Singer; musician; composer
- Instrument: Tumbi
- Years active: 1952–1991
- Label: His Master's Voice

Lal Chand Yamla Jatt (Batwal Rajput) (28 March 1910 – 20 December 1991) was a noted Indian folk singer in the Punjabi-language. His trademark was his soft strumming of the tumbi and his turban tying style known traditionally as "Turla". Many consider him to be the pinnacle of the Punjabi music and an artist who arguably laid the foundation of contemporary Punjabi music in India.

== Career ==
His most famous songs were "Das Main Ki Pyar Wichon Khattya" and "Satgur Nanak Teri Leela Nyaari Ae" and "Whisky Di Botal Wargi". He recorded some duet songs with Mohinderjit Kaur Sekhon, who was a recording artist with All India Radio (AIR), Jalandhar. He also popularized singing of Dulla Bhatti, Shahni Kaulan and Puran Bhagat. His first recording was with His Master's Voice in 1952 and till last he remained with His Master's Voice. He performed all over the world and many times performed with Alam Lohar. They were also good friends. He also popularized the Tumbi, a traditional North Indian instrument. His music has been sampled by Panjabi MC on his best-selling bhangra album Legalised. Later 2018, a music producer from Pakistan with stage name 'Ghauri', recreated his famous "Das Main Ki Pyar Wichon Khattya" with modern touch that went viral over video-sharing social networking service TikTok ending up Bollywood actors and actresses making short video over the same track on tiktok platform.

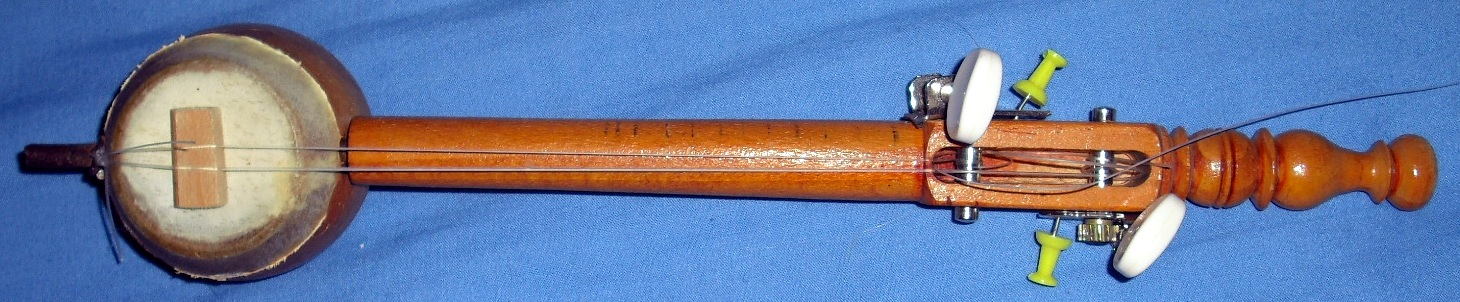
Tumbi

Ved Parkash took lessons from Lal Chand Yamla Jatt and considered him his music-guru. Ved Parkash still keeps a picture of Yamla Jatt in his wallet to this day.

=== Awards ===
He was awarded the Gold Medal By Indian Prime minister Pt. Jawaharlal Nehru in 1956. He was awarded a lifetime contribution award in 1989 by National Academy of Dance, Drama and Music, Delhi, India.

== Discography ==
- Khedan De Din Chaar
- Jawani Meri Rangli
- Das Main Ki Pyar Wichon Khatya – released in 1963
- Mittran Di Maa Marri
- Tara Pave Boliyan
- Whiskey Di Botal Wargi
- Saiyaan Da Kotha
- Charkhi Rangli Teri
- Satguru Nanak Teri Leela Neyaari
- Mein Teri Tu Mera

== See also ==
- Alam Lohar
- List of Punjabi singers
