= Karnail Gill =

- Born: Karnail Singh Gill ਕਰਨੈਲ ਸਿੰਘ ਗਿੱਲ; 13 February 1942; Gurusar Chak no. 259, Layallpur district, British Punjab
- Origin: Ludhiana
- Died: 24 June 2012 (aged 70) Jamalpur Awana, Ludhiana district, East Punjab
- Genres: Folk
- Occupation: Singer
- Instrument: Harmonium
- Years active: 1964–2012

Karnail Gill (Punjabi: ਕਰਨੈਲ ਗਿੱਲ) was a Punjabi folk singer of Punjab. He is best known for his duets with Narinder Biba, Surinder Kaur, Jagmohan Kaur, Mohni Narula, Swaran Lata, Ranjit Kaur, Kumari Veena, Kuldip Kaur, Gulshan Komal, Priti Bala, Usha Kiran, Harneet Neetu, Sukhwant Sukhi, Suchet Bala, Sarbjit Cheema, Rakhi Hundal, Navdeep Kaur and many more.

Suffering from spinal cancer, he died on 24 June 2012, survived by his wife Sukhjinder Kaur, son Gurtej Singh and two daughters Kanwardeep Kaur and Kirandeep Kaur, and students Rakhi Hundal, Anoop Sidhu. He was cremated at his village of Jamalpur in Ludhiana district.

== Early life and career ==
Gill was born on 13 February 1942 in a Sikh family, to father S. Mehar Singh Gill (Lambarhdar) and mother Gurdial Kaur, in the Gurusar (Chak no. 259) village of Layallpur district (renamed Faisalabad District) in British Punjab. After partition of Punjab, his village was gone in West Punjab (Pakistani Punjab) and his family migrated to Indian Punjab and settled at Jamalpur Awana village that now falls under the Ludhiana district. Later, along with singer Didar Sandhu, he worked in Punjab Public Relations as a singer 1962 to 1964 for one and half-year. He married Sukhjinder Kaur in 1970; the couple had one son and two daughters.

Karnail Singh learned folk music from noted Punjabi singer Ustad Harcharan Grewal, Shaukin Jatt, Master Beer Chand and classical music from Ustad Jaswant Bhanwra and recorded his first songs record by HMV Gaddi Charhdi Bhna Laye Gode, Cha Muklave Da and Melne Nach Lai Ni De de Shauk De Gerhe", in 1963 and released in 1964 written by Hardev Dilgir (also known as Dev Tharike Wala).

== Songs and compositions ==
- Lambrhan Da Munda Boli Hor Bolda
- Satth Vich Laggi Ae Kachehri
- Teean Wangu Langhe Ne Din Mittra
- Panj Bhadon Nu Ayin Ve Lain Darauja
- Laddu Kha Ke Turdi Bani
- Reshmi Rumaal Vangu Rakh Mundiya
- Tera Galgal Varga Rang Jattiye
- Eh Keehne Qaid Kare
- Sutiya Tu Jaag Bandiya
- Satguru Hoye Diyal
- Jorhe Puttran De Kaum Lekhe La Ke Patshah
- Ambiyan Nu Tarsengi Chhadd Ke Desh Doaba
- Maal Ladd Liya Jammu Kashmir Da
- Jatti Faishna Patti
- Jadon Dee Hogi Sadhni
- Tere Jatti Na Pasand Ve Sharab Vargi
- Nadhiyan Kuwariyan De Shauk Poorda
