= Babu Singh Maan =

Indian artist

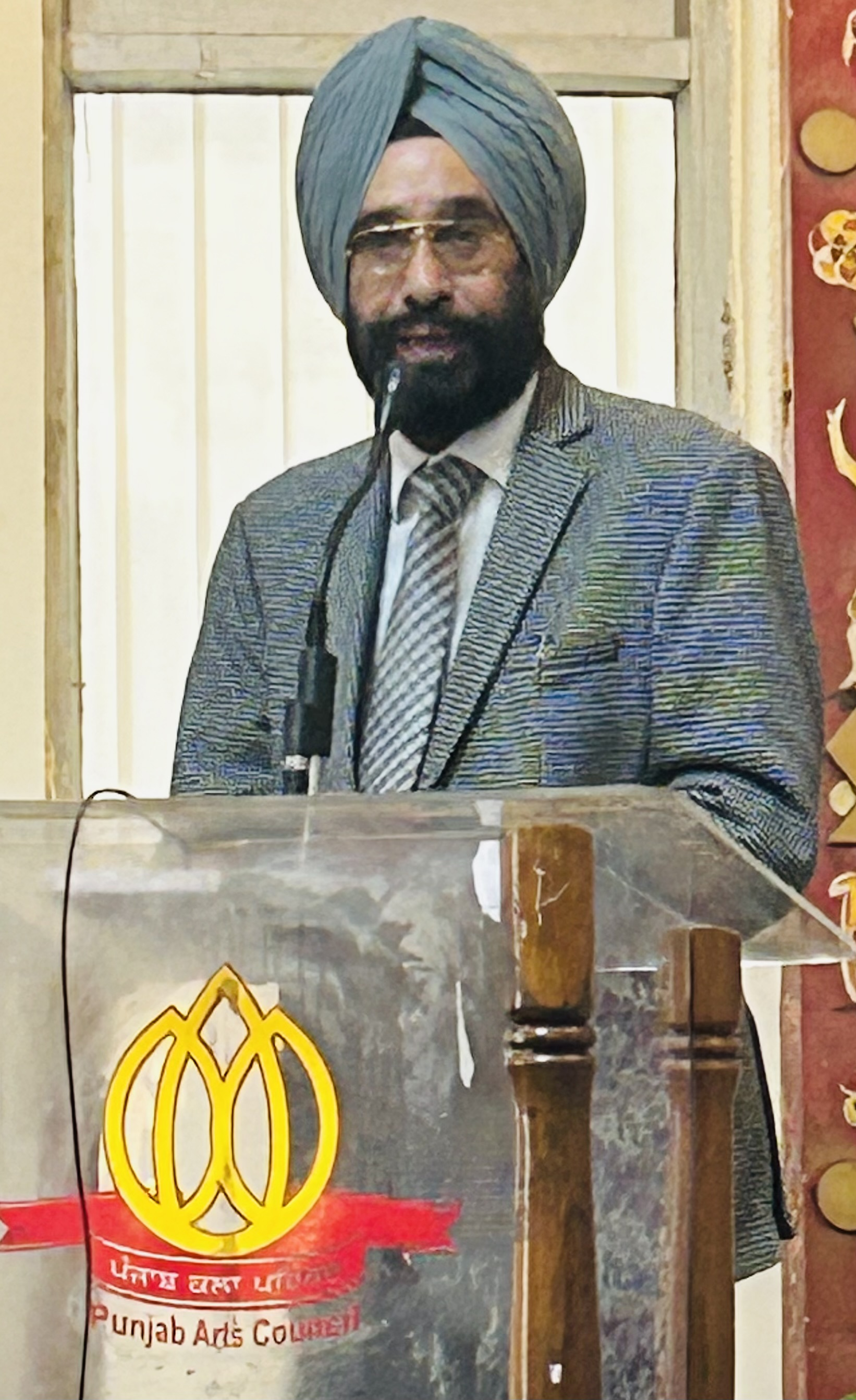
- Babu Singh Mann

Background information
- Also known as: Babu Singh Maan
- Born: Babu Singh Maan; 10 October 1942 (age 83); Marahar, (Punjab, India)
- Genres: Folk, Duets
- Occupations: Songwriter/Lyricist

Babu Singh Maan, also known as Maan Maraarhan Wala, is an Indian songwriter/lyricist of Punjabi-language folk songs. He penned the first song of singer Kuldeep Manak's career.

== Early life ==
Maan was born on 10 October 1942, to father S. Inder Singh and mother Aas Kaur, in the village of Marahar of Faridkot district in British Punjab. He got his primary education from the nearby village known as Jand Sahib and his poetry started publishing in children magazines while he was in just 6th standard. He passed his graduation from Barjindra College, Faridkot.

== Career ==
His song, duddh kahrh ke jaag na laavan, terian udeekan haania was published in a magazine by Kartar Singh Balaggan. His first book, Geetan Da Wanjaara, was published in 1963. His first recorded song was sung by singer Gurpal Singh Pal and later many famous singers like Harcharan Grewal, Surinder Kaur, Sukhwinder Singh, Mohammad Rafi, Lata Mangeshkar, Gurcharan Pohli, Harbhajan Maan, Babbu Maan and more have given voices to his songs. He is the person to write the first song of singer Kuldeep Manak's career. Most of his duets were sung by Muhammad Sadiq and Ranjit Kaur. He has also written songs for many films including Nasibo and Sassi Punnu. He is a versatile artist and touched on many important topics in his songs. Most of his songs speak about the village culture and relationships. He has also written songs about the famous love stories of Punjab like Heer Ranjha, Mirza Sahiban, Sohni Mahiwal and Heroes of Punjabi folklores and history like Pooran Bhagat and Sucha Singh Soorma. Maan has also served as Sarpanch of his village 3 times.

== See also ==
- Muhammad Sadiq
- Dev Tharike Wala
- Gurmel Singh Dhillon
- Babu Rajab Ali
- Gurdas Maan
