= Ranjit Kaur =

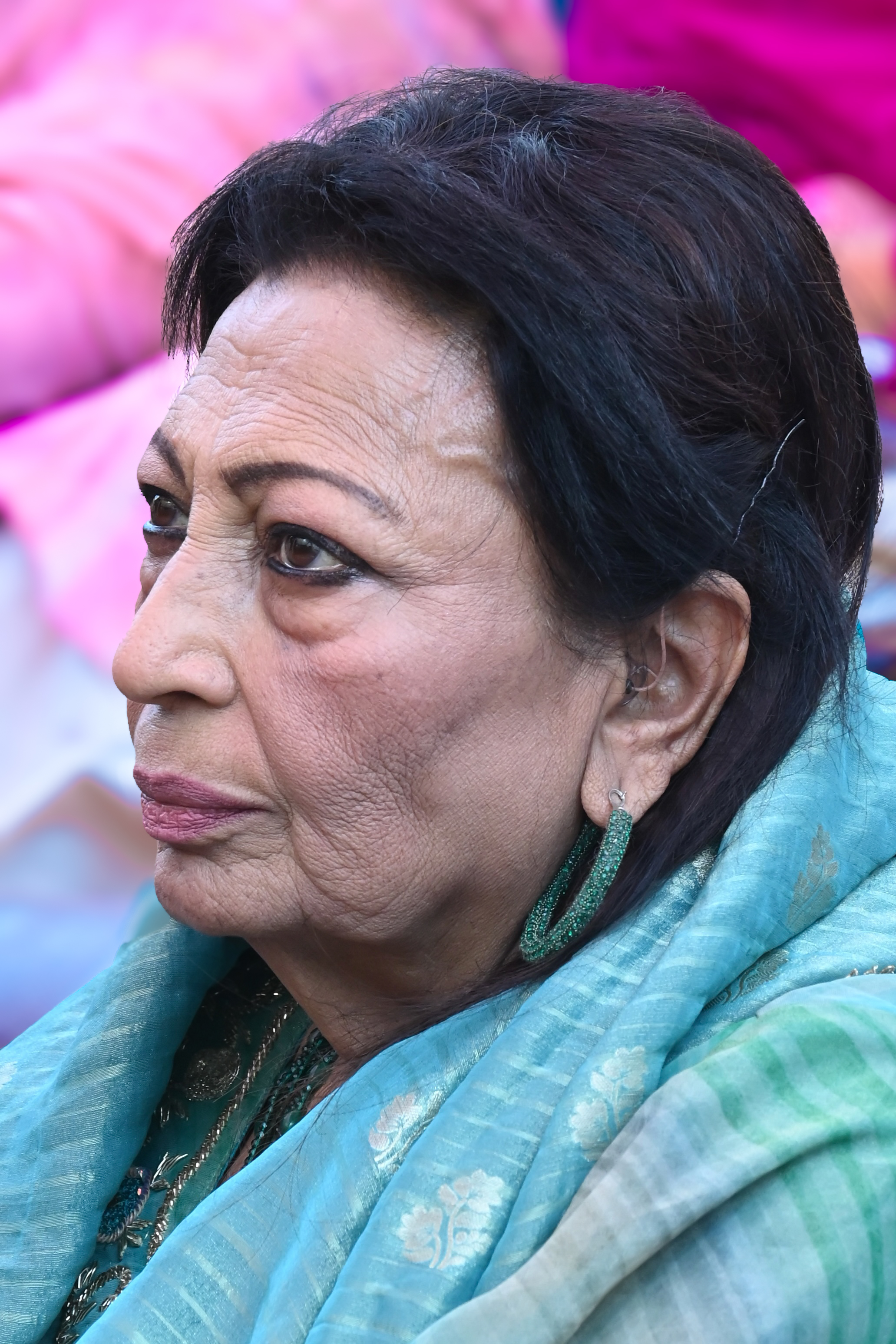

Background information
- Born: 1948 or 1949 (age 77–78)
- Genres: Folk, filmi
- Occupations: Singer, playback singer, actor
- Instruments: Tumbi, Harmonium, Tabla
- Label: His Master's Voice

Ranjit Kaur (also spelled as Ranjeet Kaur) is an Indian singer working in Punjabi music and films. She is known for her duets with Muhammad Sadiq. She did many Punjabi films as a playback singer and some as a side-actress.

== See also ==
- "Jogi" (Panjabi MC song), a remix version of her song with Muhammad Sadiq "Na Dil De Pardesi Nu"
