= Ahuja =

Surname of Indic origin

Ahuja is an Indian (Punjabi and Sindhi) surname, held by Hindus and Sikhs of the Arora, Jat, and Amil Lohana communities. Ahuja means "descendant of Ahu".

== Notable people ==
=== Administration ===
- Deepak Ahuja (born 1963), former CFO at Tesla
- Kiran Ahuja (born 1971), American attorney and activist serving as the director of the United States of America Office of Personnel Management
- Ravi Ahuja (born 1971), American business executive

=== Armed Forces ===
- Ajay Ahuja (1963–1999), Indian fighter pilot martyred during the Kargil War

=== Art ===
- Ameena Ahmad Ahuja, Indian painter, calligrapher, writer and linguist
- Charanjit Ahuja (1953–2025), Indian music producer and composer
- Hamisha Daryani Ahuja (born 1984), Indian-Nigerian actress and producer
- Mequitta Ahuja (born 1976), American contemporary feminist painter
- Naman Ahuja (born 1974), Indian art historian and curator
- Nilesh Ahuja, Indian singer, songwriter and composer
- Rita Rani Ahuja, American actress
- Sachin Ahuja (born 1978), Indian music producer and music composer

=== Athletics ===
- Davinder Ahuja, badminton bronze medalist at the 1974 Asian Games
- Kanika Ahuja (born 2002), Indian cricketer
- Neha Ahuja (born 1981), Indian alpine skier and first Indian woman to qualify for the Winter Olympics
- Suraj Ahuja (born 1999), Indian cricketer, former captain of the India national under-19 cricket team

=== Bollywood ===
- Govinda (born 1963), Indian actor
- Aakash Ahuja (born 1991), Indian actor
- Arun Kumar Ahuja (1917–1998), Indian actor
- Govinda Ahuja, Indian actor
- Richa Ahuja, Indian actress
- Sarwar Ahuja (born 1980), Indian actor
- Shiney Ahuja (born 1973), Indian actor
- Shubhi Ahuja, Indian actress
- Sonam Kapoor Ahuja, Indian actress
- Sushma Ahuja (born 1952), Indian director, writer and actress
- Krushal Ahuja (born 1994), Indian actor

=== Journalism ===
- Anjana Ahuja, British Indian science journalist and a former columnist for The Times
- Maneet Ahuja, American author, journalist, television news producer and hedge fund specialist

=== Politics ===
- Gyan Dev Ahuja, BJP politician
- Hargun Das Ahuja (born 1970), Pakistani politician

=== Science, medicine and academia ===
- Kamal Ahuja (born 1954), physiologist and the managing and scientific director of JD Healthcare
- M. M. S. Ahuja (1929–1998), Indian physician and endocrinologist
- Narendra Ahuja, Indian-American computer scientist
- Nita Ahuja, American surgeon and the Chair of the Department of Surgery at Yale School of Medicine
- Ravindra K. Ahuja (born 1956), Indian-American computer scientist and entrepreneur and CFO of Optym
- Sunil Kumar Ahuja (born 1961), professor of medicine at the University of Texas
- V. K. Ahuja (born 1967), professor at the Faculty of Law, University of Delhi, India and is presently serving as the Vice-Chancellor of National Law University, Assam, India

=== Social work ===
- Jagdish Lal Ahuja (died 2021), Indian social worker
- Sparsh Ahuja, Indian-Australian social activist and documentary film maker

== See also ==
- Monte Ahuja College of Business
- University Hospitals Ahuja Medical Center
