= Atul Sharma =

Indian composer and producer (born 1961)

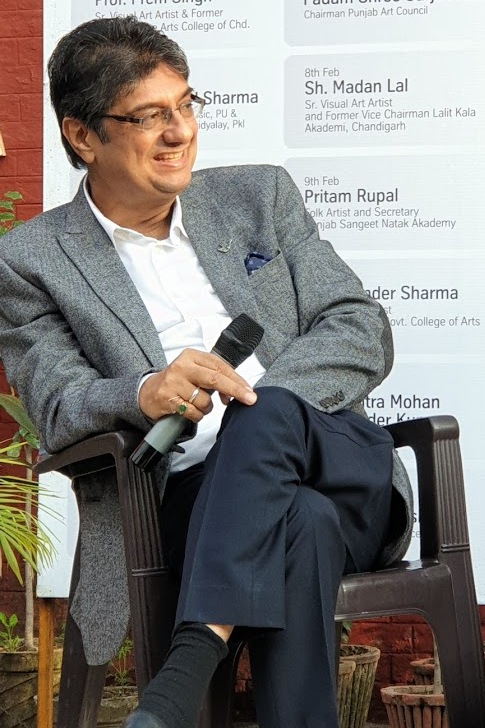
- Sharma in 2019

Background information
- Born: 9 May 1961 (age 65)
- Origin: Chandigarh, Punjab, India (present-day Chandigarh (U.T.), India)
- Occupations: composer; producer; sitarist; singer; television personality
- Instrument: Sitar
- Years active: 1980s–present
- Member of: The Red Brick House
- Spouse: Shivani Sharma

Atul Sharma (born 9 May 1961) is an Indian composer, producer, sitarist, and singer. He worked on Punjabi and Hindi albums and films and served as a judge on the musical reality TV show Voice of Punjab. He has composed songs such as "Yaar Bolda", "Dupatta Tera Satt Rang Da", "Mukhda Dekh ke", "Jatti", and "Mitraan Da Naa Chalda". Sharma also composed music for theatre productions and collaborated with various directors and playwrights.

Sharma performs with his band, The Red Brick House, which also includes his wife, Shivani, and son Sharang. He is also the chairman of the Chandigarh Sangeet Natak Akademi (CSNA).

== Career ==
=== Punjabi music ===
Sharma began his composing career in the early 1980s, with his first Punjabi album Mela Yaaran Da, performed by Hakam Sufi. He also composed for numerous albums for singers including Hans Raj Hans, Sardool Sikander, Kuldeep Manak, Gurdas Maan, and Surjit Bindrakhia. He also composed scores for Punjabi films such as Jatt Jeaona Mour and Badla Jatti Da (both in 1991).

Sharma worked with singer Surjit Bindrakhia and lyricist Shamsher Singh Sandhu on several albums. Their work included the album Munda Ki Mangda and tracks such as "Bas Kar Bas Kar" (1992) and "Dupatta Tera Satt Rang Da", which appeared on the UK Asian music charts and received platinum certification. Other tracks include "Lakk Tunu Tunu", "Mukhda Dekh Ke", and "Yaar Bolda".

Sharma collaborated with Harjit Harman on the album Punjebaan. He received the Best Music Director award from the PTC Punjabi Music Awards for the song "Mitran Da Naa Chalda" in 2005 and for "Jatti" in 2015; the latter also won Best Folk-Oriented Song.

Sharma also composed music for Kuldip Manak, Surinder Shinda, Gurdas Maan, Hans Raj Hans, Labh Janjua, Mohammad Sadiq, Ranjit Kaur, Sardool Sikander, Amar Noori, Malkit Singh, Narinder Biba, Jagmohan Kaur, Dolly Guleria, Manmohan Waris, Sarbjit Cheema, Harbhajan Mann, Durga Rangila, Satwinder Bugga, Bhagwant Mann, Satinder Bitti, Jaspinder Narula, Surjit Khan, Gurj Sidhu and others.

Sharma mentored several artists, including Yudhvir Manak, Gippy Grewal, Master Saleem, Avtar Singh Kang, Miss Pooja, Kamal Khan, Roshan Prince, and Preet Harpal.

=== Theatre music ===
Sharma studied Indian theatre at Panjab University's Department of Indian Theatre in Chandigarh. He has composed music and soundtracks for theatre productions and has collaborated with national award-winning playwrights such as Dr. Atamjit Singh. He also composed music for Shiv Kumar Batalvi's play Luna.

=== Contributions to the recording industry in Punjab ===
In 2001, Sharma established the audio recording studio Saffron Touch in Chandigarh. The studio has been used by musicians and film directors from the Punjabi music industry, Bollywood, and International projects.

== Awards and honors ==
- Best Music Director – PTC Punjabi Music Awards, 2005
- "Starcity Punjab da Superstar" – Zee ETC Punjabi, 2006
- Best Music Director – PTC Punjabi Music Awards, 2015
- Suran da Shehenshah – PTC Punjabi Music Awards, 2015
