= Jija Lak Minle =

1984 album by Amar Singh Chamkila

Studio album by Amar Singh Chamkila & Amarjot
- Released: 1984
- Genre: Punjabi
- Label: His Master's Voice

Amar Singh Chamkila & Amarjot chronology
Jija Lak Minle	Hikk Utte So Ja Ve

Jija Lak Minle (Punjabi: ਜੀਜਾ ਲੱਕ੍ ਮਿਣ ਲੈ) is a Punjabi music album by Amar Singh Chamkila and Amarjot, released in 1984 on the His Master's Voice label (catalog number ECSD 3100). All lyrics were written by Chamkila, with music composed by Charanjit Ahuja. The title belongs to the jija-saali (brother-in-law and sister-in-law) teasing song tradition in Punjabi folk music. Ethnomusicologist Gibb Schreffler has classified Chamkila and Amarjot's recordings as "commercial folk music." The album was later reissued on cassette (catalog TPCS 01B 2059) and on compact disc in 2000 (catalog CDNF 140 155).

== Track listing ==
All lyrics are written by Amar Singh Chamkila; all music is composed by Charanjit Ahuja.

Album
No.	Title	Artist(s)	Length
1.	"Jija Lak Minle"	Amar Singh Chamkila & Amarjot	2:41
2.	"Gora Gora Rang Jatta"	Amar Singh Chamkila & Amarjot	3:21
3.	"Kan Kar Gal Sun Makhna"	Amar Singh Chamkila & Amarjot	3:53
4.	"Tera Deor Sire Da Velli"	Amar Singh Chamkila & Amarjot	4:32
5.	"Gaddi Te Likha Le Mera Naon"	Amar Singh Chamkila & Amarjot	3:14
6.	"Pekeyan De Ghar Mein Changi"	Amar Singh Chamkila & Amarjot	2:44
7.	"Pehle Lalkare Naal"	Amar Singh Chamkila & Amarjot	3:29
8.	"Patua Pattan Nu Phirda"	Amar Singh Chamkila & Amarjot	3:59
9.	"Mera Viah Karvaon Nu Jee"	Amar Singh Chamkila & Amarjot	3:19
10.	"Milno Vi Reh Gia Ve"	Amar Singh Chamkila & Amarjot	3:26
11.	"Datt Khol Mitra"	Amar Singh Chamkila & Amarjot	3:15
12.	"Kud Kud Maare Chubian"	Amar Singh Chamkila & Amarjot	3:02

== Personnel ==
- Amar Singh Chamkila – vocals, lyrics
- Amarjot – vocals
- Charanjit Ahuja – music
- Amalesh Dev – cover design
