= Dugri (disambiguation) =

Dugri is a village in the Indian state of Punjab.

Dugri may also refer to:

- Dugri speech, a style of frank speech of Israeli sabras
- Dugri (duo), Israeli music duo of Sameh Zakout and Uriya Rosenman
- Dugri Inc., anonymous peer support network founded by Murray Brennan and Jonathan Lewis
