= Nirmal Singh =

Nirmal Singh may refer to:

- Nirmal Singh (Shutrana politician) from INC in Punjab, India
- Nirmal Singh Khalsa (1952–2020), Sikh Hazoori Ragi of Darbar Sahib
- Nirmal Singh (judge) (born 1947), MLA of Bassi Pathana
- Nirmal Kumar Singh (born 1956), BJP politician and deputy chief minister of Jammu and Kashmir
- Nirmal Singh (Haryana politician) (born 1953), Congress politician from Haryana
- Nirmal Singh Maharaj (1952-2007), Indian spiritual leader popularly known as "Guruji"
