= Voice of Punjab =

- Genre: Reality television
- Directed by: Lakshman Kumar
- Judges: Sachin Ahuja; Kamal Khan; Malkit Singh
- Country of origin: India
- Original language: Punjabi
- No. of seasons: 16

Production
- Running time: approx. 1 hour

Original release
- Network: PTC Punjabi

Voice of Punjab (VOP) is an Indian Punjabi-language musical reality television show which is telecast on PTC Punjabi. Auditions for the show are held in major cities in Punjab, India such as Mohali, Jalandhar, Ludhiana and the holy city of Amritsar .

The Reality Show Also Has a Platform for Kids ( Aged 8 - 14 ) As Voice Of Punjab Chotta Champ .

WINNERS OF VOP - Chotta Champ

Season 1 - Loveleen Kaur (2014)

Season 2 - Simran Raj ( 2015 )

Season 3 - Nand ( 2016 )

Season 4 - Pankaj Das ( 2017 )

Season 5 - Harman Singh ( 2018 )

Season 6 - Ananya Sharma ( 2019 )

Season 7 - Ishita ( 2021 )

Season 8 - Arjun Singh ( 2022 )

Season 9 - Sahil Bharadwaj ( 2023 )

Season 10 - Manpreet Singh ( 2024 )

== Seasons 1 ==
The winners of the first season of Voice of Punjab were Vinod Kumar and Paramjeet Kaur Which Concluded In September 2010 . The Judges Of First Season were Sarabjeet Kaur, Jasbir Jassi and Hans Raj Hans Including Celebrity Guests As Well .

== Season 2 ==
Voice of Punjab Season 2 started in April 2011, across Punjab. Pardeep Singh Sran from Bathinda and Jaspinder kaur from Chandigarh and were awarded as the winners. The anchor of the show was Sahil Vedoliyaa. The Judges Of 2nd Season Was Jasbir Jassi , Sachin Ahuja and Sarabjeet Kaur .

== Season 3 ==
Anantpal Singh from Ferozpur and Nimratpal Kaur from Gurdaspur won Voice of Punjab Season 3. They were awarded a car and a contract for a music album, to be launched by Vanjali Records. The anchor of the show was Sahil Vedoliya and Sugandha Mishra . The Judges Was Sachin Ahuja, Master Saleem and Shazia Manzoor. The Grand Finale Broadcast Live on 25 August 2012 At Ranjit Avenue Grounds Amritsar .

== Season 4 ==
VOP Season 4 brought back Sachin Ahuja, Master Saleem and Shazia Manzoor as judges to pick the best Punjabi singing talent from all over the world. The auditions were conducted not only across India but also in many cities of Canada and the United Kingdom. The hosts were Sahil and Gurjit Singh. This season was extremely anticipated as the expectation of talents were very high. Deepesh Rahi was conferred with the title of Voice of Punjab 2013. The winner was chosen from three singers selected from among the six finalists. Previously, PTC used to select two singers, one male and one female, but this was the first time that one singer would be conferred with the title of Voice of Punjab. the anchors of the show were Sahil Vedoliyaa and Gurjit Singh. Harmanpreet Kaur Was Awarded The First Runner Up and Gurbinder Singh Was Second Runner Up.

== Season 5 ==
Neha Sharma of Kapurthala was declared as the winner of Season 5. Sadhu Singh from Batala was declared 1st runner-up while Simran Singh of Mukerian was declared 2nd runner-up. The anchor of the show was Gurjit Singh. The Judges Were Sachin Ahuja Master Saleem and Lakhwinder Wadali.

== Season 6 ==
Sonali Dogra of Jammu won Voice of Punjab Season 6. She won a cash prize of Rs. one lakh and a car. The winner was decided after the six finalists performed live before a huge audience. The Judges Was Lakhwinder Wadali , Master Saleem And Gurmeet Singh . The Season Was Hosted by Gurjit Singh. The First Runner Up Was Sonu Gill And Sahil Akhtar Was Second Runner Up. This Season Featured previous year contestants as masters and challenges was those who has participated in only season 6 it was a tough competition but at the end 6 finalist reached the Grand Finale Priya Sidhu , Mohammed Danish ,Sonali Dogra ,Sonu gill , Sahil Akhtar and Sunny atwal.

== Season 7 ==
The winner of Voice of Punjab Season 7 was Amarjit Singh. Jasmine Dhiman Was First Runner Up And Himmat Sandhu Was Second Runner Up . The Judges Were Sachin Ahuja , Gurmeet Singh, Kanth Kaler and Master Saleem With Guests As Well . The Hosts Were Gurjit Singh And Youngveer .

== Season 8 ==
Voice of Punjab season 8 was hosted by Gurjit Singh and half by Sahil Vedoliyaa with Gurjit Singh. The judges this year were Sachin Ahuja, Roshan Prince, and Miss Pooja with guests as well. The winner of season 8 was Gurkirat Kaur. Gurmantar Singh and Surtaal Kular was First and second runner ups respectively.

== Season 9 ==
Voice of Punjab season 9 was hosted by Gurjit Singh, VJ Rocky and Mukesh. The judges included Sachin Ahuja, Kamal Khan and Malkit Singh. Gaurav Kaundal was announced winner during the grand finale on 1 March 2019. Anoop Dhari From Jalandhar And Sukhpreet Kaur From Ludhiana Was First and second runner ups respectively .

VOP Season 9 voting

Voting of Voice of Punjab Season 9 started from 22 February 2019.

Season 9 finalists
Voting code	Contestant	Location
VOP01	Jatinder Mallewal	Gurdaspur
VOP02	Sukhpreet Kaur	Ludhiana
VOP03	Anoop Dhari	Jalandhar
VOP04	Gourav Koundal	Bilaspur
VOP05	Reena Nafri	Rupnagar
VOP06	Sukhchain Singh	Canada

Date, time and venue of the Grand Finale

Time - 6 pm onwards

Date - 1 March 2019

Venue - 97 Acer Scheme, Parking Ground, Ranjit Avenue, Amritsar (Punjab, India)

Lakhwinder Wadali, Kaur B and Rajvir Jawanda performed in the Grand Finale.

== Season 10 ==
Voice of Punjab Season 10 auditions started on 20 November in Amritsar. They ended on 28 November in Mohali. The judges were Sachin Ahuja, Kanth Kaler, and Miss Pooja, with guests as well. The Winner of this Season was Sunny Bal . The First Runner up was Gursewak Singh and Second Runner Up Title Was Given To Rahul Verma . With Grand Finale Episode Ending On 8 February 2020.

Season 10 auditions
Date	City	Time	Address
18 November	Amritsar	9 am to 4 pm	Guru Nanak Bhawan, City Centre, Near Bus Stand, Amritsar
20 November	Bathinda	9 am to 4 pm	Baba Farid Group of Institute Village – Deon Bathinda, Punjab – 151001
22 November	Ludhiana	9 am to 4 pm	Guru Nanak Dev Engineering College Gill Park, Gill Road, Ludhiana
24 November	Jalandhar	9 am to 4 pm	Baldev Raj Mittal Auditorium Lovely Professional University, Jalandhar
26 November	Patiala	9 am to 4 pm	Sunny Oberoi Arts Auditorium Punjabi University, Patiala, Punjab – 147001
28 November	Mohali	9 am to 4 pm	Dara Studio Phase-6, Sector 56, NH-21 Mohali, Punjab – 160055

== Winners ==
- Season 1 - Vinod Kumar and Paramjit Kaur
- Season 2 - Pardeep Sran and Jaspinder Kaur
- Season 3 - Anantpal Billa and Nimrat Khaira
- Season 4 - Deepesh Rahi
- Season 5 - Neha Sharma
- Season 6 - Sonali Dogra
- Season 7 - Amarjit Singh
- Season 8 - Gurkirat Kaur
- Season 9 - Gaurav Kaundal
- Season 10 - Sunny Bal
- Season 11 - Abhijeet Bhandari and Kushagra Kalia
- Season 12 - Gurmeet Singh
- Season 13 - Kavita
- Season 14 - Nikita Puri
- Season 15 - Bunty Bhandal
- Season 16 - Mannat Patiala
