= Gay Star News =

LGBT news website

- Company type: Private
- Industry: Internet News
- Founded: 2011
- Founder: Tris Reid-Smith (Director, Editor-in-Chief); Scott Nunn (Director of Sales and Marketing)
- Headquarters: London, United Kingdom
- Area served: Worldwide
- Website: www.gaystarnews.co.uk

Gay Star News (GSN) is a news website focused on events related to and concerning the global LGBTI (lesbian, gay, bisexual, transgender and intersex) community. Headquartered in the UK, it is privately owned and was founded by Tris Reid-Smith, and Scott Nunn in December 2011.

The site reports on breaking news in international politics, religion, business, crime, entertainment and lifestyle. The site also features interviews with members of the LGBTI community. A staff of internationally based professional reporters handles day-to-day stories but the site also includes articles by LGBTI activists, freelancers, bloggers, academics, historians, celebrities, and people of prominence.

The site features 'top stories', 'entertainment', 'features', 'travel', 'GSN loves' and 'comment', 'Business', 'Family, 'Support' and 'Prides and Festivals' sections. Readers could post comments, share and like stories to display on online social networks including Facebook, Instagram, Twitter, YouTube, Weibo and LinkedIn.

On 30 July 2019, GSN announced that it would be shutting down after almost eight years because of falling revenues due to an inability to monetize. However, following acquisition of the intellectual property of GSN by Iconic Labs, publication has resumed.

Gay Star News was bought by Joe Media and relaunched in June 2024.

== History ==
Former logo

Gay Star News went live with the backing of investors Goldman Sachs, PricewaterhouseCoopers and National Australia Bank on 16 January 2012. Stephen Fry then tweeted his support to his 3.7 million followers, and is credited by Gay Star News for publicising their site regularly.

In 2012 the site won the Stonewall UK Award for Publication of the Year.

The editorial policy of Gay Star News is to publish pro-LGBTI media without activism. Commonly seen advertisers on the site are: International Fund for Animal Welfare, Direct Line insurance, Lufthansa Airways, Travelex, Lloyds Bank, Smirnoff, Blued, Manchester United, late night rooms, Alfa Romeo, Heathrow, Snickers, Hoseasons, naked wines, npower, Fujitsu, the co-operative, the London Women's Clinic, Knight Frank, DigitasLBI and several pride support groups.

In 2016 Gay Star News launched Digital Pride, an annual, week-long program of online discussions, articles and video events to promote LGBTI Pride around the world – particularly to those in countries facing oppression.
