= Virginie Lemoine =

French actress and comedian (born 1961)

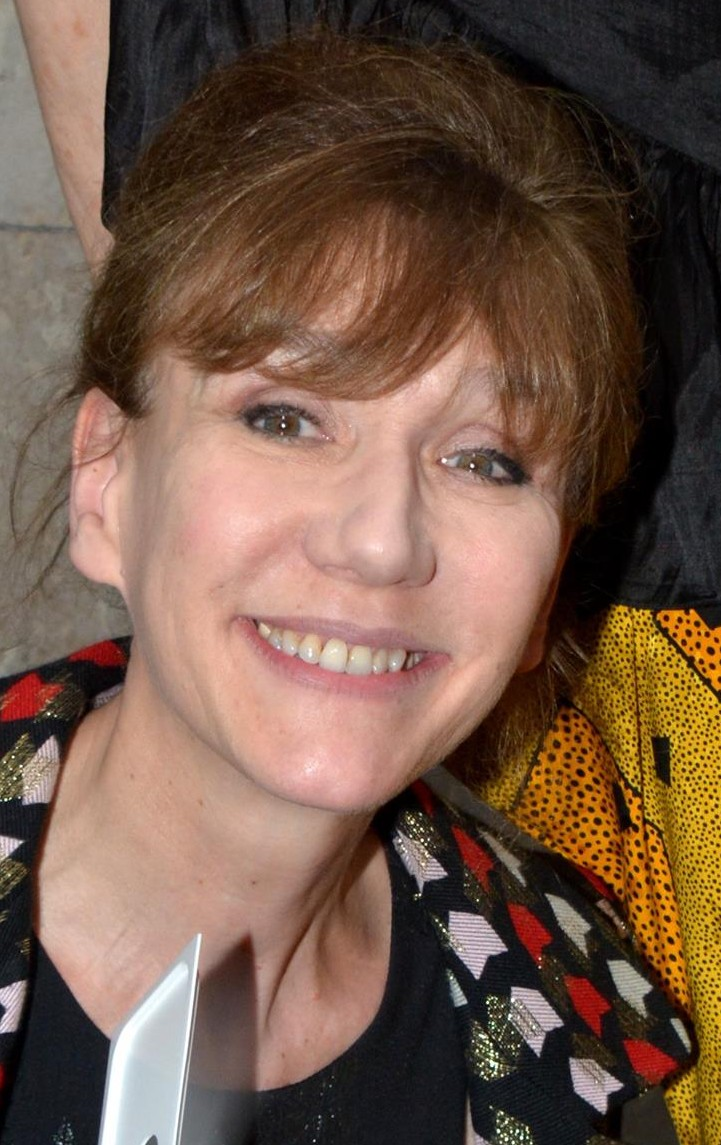
- Lemoine in 2018
- Born: 26 February 1961 (age 65); Suresnes, France
- Occupations: Actress, comedian
- Years active: 1982–present

Virginie Lemoine (born 26 February 1961) is a French actress and comedian.

== Career ==
Virginie Lemoine attended acting school at the Conservatory in Rouen. From 1982 to 1990, she acted in stage theater, and regularly participated in the show Ainsi font font font, hosted by Jacques Martin on France 2. In 1991, she became a radio host in the show C'est aussi bien à l'ombre and Le Vrai Faux Journal. In 1992, Laurent Gerra and Lemoine became a comedy duo and appeared in many television shows, becoming very popular. In 1997, they won the Molière Award for best one-man show for their show at the Théâtre Déjazet.

Since 1999, she has acted in several theater productions and also directed several plays. In 2010, she received a nomination for the Molière Award for Best Musical for creating Une diva à Sarcelles, a musical that she wrote and directed.

She is best known for playing Marion Ferrière, the lead role of the TV series Famille d'accueil, broadcast on France 3 from 2001 to 2016.

== Personal life ==
Lemoine was married to actor and singer Alexandre Bonstein. Through her marriage with him, she also has Swiss nationality.

From 1991 to 1997, she was in a relationship with Laurent Gerra.

She currently is in a relationship with actor Darius Kehtari.

== Theater ==
=== As actress ===
Year	Title	Author	Director	Notes
1989	100 % Polyamide	Virginie Lemoine	Jean-Luc Dumesnil	
1993-95	Le syndrome de Madame Chiasson	Virginie Lemoine	Alain Sachs	
1996-97	Lemoine/Gerra au Théâtre Déjazet	Virginie Lemoine & Laurent Gerra	Agnès Boury	Molière Award for Best one man show
1999	Absent Friends	Alan Ayckbourn	Catherine Allary	
2001	Les désirs sauvages de mon mari m’ont presque rendue folle	John Tobias	Éric Civanyan	
2004	The Vagina Monologues	Eve Ensler	Isabelle Rattier	
2005	À fond la caisse	Franck Didier	Jérôme Foucher	
2006-07	Si c'était à refaire	Laurent Ruquier	Jean-Luc Moreau	
2007	Coiffure pour dames	Robert Harling	Daniel Roussel	
2009	Move Over Mrs. Markham	Ray Cooney	Rodolphe Sand	
2018	Deathtrap	Ira Levin	Éric Métayer	
2018	Manhattan Murder Mystery	Woody Allen	Elsa Royer	
2019	Comme en 14	Dany Laurent	Yves Pignot	
2020	Spiridon Superstar	Philippe Jaenada	Virginie Lemoine & Laury André	
2022-23	Oscar	Claude Magnier	Antony Mettler	
2022-23	Black Comedy	Peter Shaffer	Grégory Barco	

=== As director ===
Year	Title	Author	Notes
2008-11	Une diva à Sarcelles	Virginie Lemoine	Nominated - Molière Award for Best Musical
2012	Le Bal	Irène Némirovsky	
2013	Brigitte, directeur d'agence	Virginie Lemoine	
2014-16	Le Bal	Irène Némirovsky	
2015-16	Une diva à Sarcelles	Virginie Lemoine	Festival Off d'Avignon - Best Musical
2016-18	31	Gaëtan Borg, Stéphane Laporte & Stéphane Corbin	
2017	Le Bal	Irène Némirovsky	
2017-19	Chagrin pour soi	Virginie Lemoine & Sophie Forte	
2018	Le Bal	Irène Némirovsky	
2018	Une diva à Sarcelles	Virginie Lemoine	
2018-20	Suite française	Irène Némirovsky	
2018-20	Tempête en juin	Irène Némirovsky	
2019	Nos années parallèles	Stéphane Corbin	
2019	Quand je serai grand, je serai Nana Mouskouri	David Lelait-Helo	
2020	Spiridon Superstar	Philippe Jaenada	
2021	Coming Out	Pierre Aucaigne & Vincent Kohler	
2021-22	Nos années parallèles	Stéphane Corbin	
2022-23	Hiring a Clown	Matei Vișniec	
2022-23	La Vie est une fête	Lilian Lloyd	
2023	Europeana	Patrik Ouředník	
2023	Coming Out	Pierre Aucaigne & Vincent Kohler	
2024	Un Air de Fête	5 de Cœur	

== Filmography ==
Year	Title	Role	Director	Actor
1996	Golden Boy	Hélène Tiercelin	Jean-Pierre Vergne	
1996	Les 2 papas et la maman	Mother "Bébé Nobel"	Jean-Marc Longval & Smaïn	
1996	Tendre piège		Serge Moati	TV movie
1998	Petite menteuse	Cécile	Thierry Chabert	TV movie
1998	Un mois de réflexion	Sarah	Serge Moati	TV movie
1999	Tombé du nid	Sonia	Édouard Molinaro	TV movie
2000	Le Mystère Parasuram	Marie Chapsky	Michel Sibra	TV movie
2001	Tania Boréalis ou L'étoile d'un été	Isabelle	Patrice Martineau	TV movie
2001-16	Famille d'accueil	Marion Ferrière	Alain Wermus, Bruno Bontzolakis, ...	TV series (95 episodes)
2002	Ma femme s'appelle Maurice	Marion Audefey	Jean-Marie Poiré	
2003	Les gaous		Igor Sekulic	
2004	La tresse d'Aminata	Mireille	Dominique Baron	TV movie
2005	It's Our Life!	The mother	Gérard Krawczyk	
2015	La boule noire	Nora Ferreira	Denis Malleval	TV movie
2017	Quand je serai grand	The press officer	Jeremy Circus	
2017	MDM - Maman de merde	The provisor	Nicolas Goergen	TV series (1 episode)
2018	Les disparus de Valenciennes	Marianne Raguenelle	Elsa Bennett & Hippolyte Dard	TV movie
2019	Nina	Marie-Pierre	Jérôme Portheault	TV series (1 episode)
2021	Cassandre	Nathalie	Marwen Abdallah	TV series (1 episode)
