= Lak Mera Kach Warga =

Lak Mera Kach Varga

Studio album by Amar Singh Chamkila
- Released: 1982
- Genre: Punjabi Duets
- Length: 45:40
- Label: His Master's Voice

Amar Singh Chamkila chronology
Hikk Utte So Ja Ve (1981)	Lak Mera Kach Varga (1982)	Mitra Main Khand Ban Gai (1983)

Lak Mera Kach Varga (Punjabi: ਲੱਕ੍ ਮੇਰਾ ਕੱਚ੍ ਵਰ੍ਗਾ) is a Punjabi music album. The album features Amar Singh Chamkila and Amarjot as the lead singers.

All lyrics are written by Amar Singh Chamkila; all music is composed by Charanjit Ahuja.

No.	Title	Length
1.	"Mitra Mein Khand Ban Gayi"	2:55
2.	"Nit Bhalde Choprhian"	2:36
3.	"Banhan Wich Bhabi"	2:44
4.	"Gol Galundi Pa Laini"	2:41
5.	"Kurti Sat Rang Di"	3:00
6.	"Bapu Sada Gum Ho Gia"	3:00
7.	"Theke Te Baitha Rehnda"	2:50
8.	"Aate Wangu Gunn Ti"	2:49
9.	"Takue Te Takua Khrhke"	2:46
10.	"Patt Deon Chugath Ni"	2:22
11.	"Teri Bhain Te Hai Aakh"	2:45
12.	"Santan Ne Pai Pheri"	2:54
13.	"Chak Lao Drivero Purje Nu"	3:05
14.	"Lak Mera Kach Varga "	3:13
15.	"Khunde Nu Tel La Ke Rakhia"	3:06
16.	"Dangan Kharhak Paian"	2:53
