= A+ Pollux =

- Theatrical release poster
- Directed by: Luc Pagès
- Screenplay by: Luc Pagès; Maïté Maillé
- Based on: Le Chameau savuage by Philippe Jaenada
- Produced by: Laurent Bénégui
- Cinematography: Chicca Ungaro
- Edited by: Valérie Pasteau
- Music by: Gérard Torikian
- Production companies: Canal+ France 3 Cinéma; France Télévision Images; Magouric Productions
- Distributed by: Magouric Distribution
- Release date: 3 July 2002
- Running time: 90 minutes
- Country: France
- Language: French
- Box office: $105.000

A+ Pollux is a 2002 film by Luc Pagès adapted from a novel by Philippe Jaenada, Le Chameau sauvage.

== Synopsis ==
It is a story of love over the most banal situations between Halvard (Gad Elmaleh) and Pollux (Cécile de France). Halvard is in love with the beautiful Pollux. She is the woman of his life. Even when she disappears, Halvard doesn't get the idea of standing shoulder to shoulder out of his head. But the disappearance creates problems of its own.

Halvard Sanz, a translator in his thirties, meets Pollux shortly after she ends a relationship. Following their initial meeting, Halvard considers Pollux his ideal partner, though she departs soon after. After ending his relationship with his girlfriend, Halvard searches for Pollux in hopes of starting a life with her.

== Cast ==
- Gad Elmaleh : Halvard Sanz
- Cécile de France : Pollux
- Nathalie Boutefeu : Pascaline
- Jean-Marie Galey : Marc
- Marina Golovine : Cécile
- Marilú Marini : Marthe
- Pierre Berriau : Julien
- Thierry Godard : Intruder

== Releases ==
- DVD A+ Pollux by Luc Pagès

== Technical details ==
- Design : Nicolas Derieux, Karima Rekhamdji
- Costumes : Bethsabée Dreyfus
- Format : colour – 2.35:1 – 35 mm
