= Le Bal =

Le Bal can refer to:

- Le Bal, a 1929 ballet by Vittorio Rieti
- Le Bal (novella), a 1931 French novella by Irène Némirovsky
- Le Bal (1931 film), a 1931 French film based on the novella
- Le Bal (1983 film), a 1983 Algerian film
- Le Bal (arts centre), a gallery, publisher, café and bookshop in Paris
- Le Bal des Débutantes, a Parisian fashion event

== See also ==
- "Un Bal", the second movement of Symphonie fantastique by Hector Berlioz
