= Hikk Utte So Ja Ve =

1981 album by Amar Singh Chamkila

Hik Utte So Ja Ve

Studio album by Umed Singh
- Released: 1981
- Genre: Punjabi Duets
- Length: 63:02
- Label: His Master's Voice

Umed Singh chronology
Jija Lak Minle (1980)	Hik Utte So Ja Ve (1981)	Lak Mera Kach Warga (1982)

Professional ratings
Review scores
Source	Rating
Opinion	4.5/5 stars

Hik Utte So Ja Ve (Punjabi: ਹਿੱਕ ਉੱਤੇ ਸੌਂ ਜਾ ਵੇ) is a Punjabi music album. The album features Amar Singh Chamkila and Amarjot as the lead singers.

All lyrics are written by Amar Singh Chamkila; all music is composed by Charanjit Ahuja.

Album
No.	Title	Artist(s)	Length
1.	"Hik Utte So Ja Ve"	Amar Singh Chamkila & Amarjot	3:28
2.	"Sooteya Giya Munda"	Amar Singh Chamkila & Amarjot	4:05
3.	"Gabroo Ho Lein De"	Amar Singh Chamkila & Amarjot	3:37
4.	"Khatre Da Ghughoo"	Amar Singh Chamkila & Amarjot	4:46
5.	"Din Aa Gaye Viah De Nerhe"	Amar Singh Chamkila & Amarjot	4:36
6.	"Lalloo Kare Kavalian"	Amar Singh Chamkila & Amarjot	3:44
7.	"Maar Lai Hor Try"	Amar Singh Chamkila & Amarjot	3:43
8.	"Chak Deun Ghare Ton"	Amar Singh Chamkila & Amarjot	4:29
9.	"Vadhaian Jetha Tenu"	Amar Singh Chamkila & Amarjot	7:12
10.	"Lai Ja Kite Door"	Amar Singh Chamkila & Amarjot	5:50
11.	"Sass Godian Thalle Lei Lai"	Amar Singh Chamkila & Amarjot	4:35
12.	"Tand Katia Na Jaye"	Amar Singh Chamkila & Amarjot	4:56
13.	"Rab Tenu Munda Deve"	Amar Singh Chamkila & Amarjot	4:00
14.	"Nachda Phire Nacharan Wangu"	Amar Singh Chamkila & Amarjot	4:00
