= Le Mystère Parasuram =

- Written by: Michel Sibra
- Directed by: Michel Sibra
- Starring: Virginie Lemoine; Kamal Kant Parwar; Alain Doutey; Patrick Raynal; Patrick Fierry; Pierre Maguelon
- Country of origin: France
- Original language: French

Production
- Running time: 85 minutes
- Production companies: DEMD Productions; France 2

Original release
- Network: France 2
- Release: 22 August 2000

Le Mystère Parasuram (transl. The mystery of Parasuram) is a 2000 French drama telefilm directed by Michel Sibra and starring Virginie Lemoine, newcomer Kamal Kant Parwar (in the titular role), Alain Doutey, Patrick Raynal, Patrick Fierry and Pierre Maguelon. The film is about immigration and identity, which was a common theme of several telefilms released that year.

== Plot ==
Marie Chapsky, the mayor of La Bonneville, is in distress when her stepfather Vincent Leduc, a station master, and his grandson David discover Parasuram Gaud, an injured and hungry Indian man who fell asleep on a ship that arrived in France. Since Parasuram only speaks Marwari, immigration official Indra Hamsa helps translate what he is saying to Marie. Marie listens to her heart and sends him to her physician husband Pierre. She then ends Parasuram to a monastery before examining the mystery of Parasuram came there in the first place. Former mayor Gustave Vaicia wants Parasuram evicted. Vaicia warns this matter to subprefect Morillon, who in turn passes the news on to Lieutenant Maillard. The monks later welcome Parasuram, who draws a Hindu deity on the walls of his room.

== Cast ==
- Virginie Lemoine as Marie Chapsky
- Kamal Kant Parwar as Parasuram Gaud
- Alain Doutey as Gustave Vaicia
- Patrick Raynal as Morillon
- Patrick Fierry as Pierre Leduc
- Pierre Maguelon as Vincent Leduc
- Richa Ahuja as Indra Hamsa
- Antonin Lebas-Joly as David Leduc
- Cédric Chevalme as Maillard
- Sébastien Cotterot as Félix
- Bernard Farcy as Hibert Dupire
- Mélanie Doutey as the hairdresser

== Production ==
Dancer Kamal Kant Parwar made his acting debut with this film. To prepare for her role of an immigration official, Richa Ahuja learned Marwari and several dance forms including Bharatanatyam, Chhau and Russian ballet.

== Release ==
The film premiered on France 2 on 22 August 2000 at 10:30 pm. The film was screened on France 2 again on 23 August 2000 at 10:50 pm. The film was screened on TV5 in The Netherlands on 11 May 2002 at 1:05 am and in Germany.

== Reception ==
Viviane Pescheux of Télé 7 Jours wrote that "An unpretentious moral tale on racism and tolerance where acting prevails and distracts. Virginia Lemoine, Alain Doutey and Patrick Raynal even manage to make people forget the heaviness of the dialogue. But the stereotypical character of the foreigner played by Kamal Kant Parwar seems to curb the potential of its interpreter".
