= Praying with Anger =

1992 Indian-American drama film

- Film poster
- Directed by: M. Night Shyamalan
- Written by: M. Night Shyamalan
- Produced by: M. Night Shyamalan
- Starring: M. Night Shyamalan; Michael Muthu
- Cinematography: Madhu Ambat
- Edited by: Frank Reynolds
- Music by: Edmund Choi
- Production company: Crescent Moon
- Distributed by: Cinevistaas
- Release dates: 12 September 1992; (United States; Toronto Film Festival)
- Running time: 107 minutes
- Countries: India; United States
- Language: English
- Budget: $900,000

Praying with Anger is a 1992 independent drama film written, produced, directed by, and starring M. Night Shyamalan in his directorial debut.

It is about a young Indian American's return to India and explores the clash of Western values with those of the Indian subcontinent.

== Plot ==
Indian American Dev Raman returns to his native country to spend a year as part of a college exchange program. He is initially reluctant, but his mother insists, and he respects her wishes. While there, he discovers that his cold and distant father, now deceased, carried a quiet and profound affection towards him.

While he is in India, he receives guidance from his friend Sanjay. As the visit progresses, Dev ignores Sanjay's suggestions, and the interaction between Indian and Western cultures quickly precipitates into misunderstanding and violence.

Dev realizes that one may pray to the deities of the Hindu pantheon in almost any emotional state except indifference. As he explores his past and sees the miscommunication between the two cultures, Dev is overwhelmed and finds himself only able to pray with anger.

== Cast ==
- M. Night Shyamalan as Dev Raman
- Mike Muthu as Sanjay
- Richa Ahuja as Rupal Mohan
- Sushma Ahuja as Mrs. Mohan
- Arun Balachandran as Raj Kahn
- Christabal Howie as Sabitha

== Release ==
The film never received a wide release for mainstream distribution and has been shown primarily at film festivals. Praying with Anger screened at the 1993 AFI Fest, where it won the "First Film Competition" for American independent filmmakers.
