= Miss Pooja =

Indian singer and actress

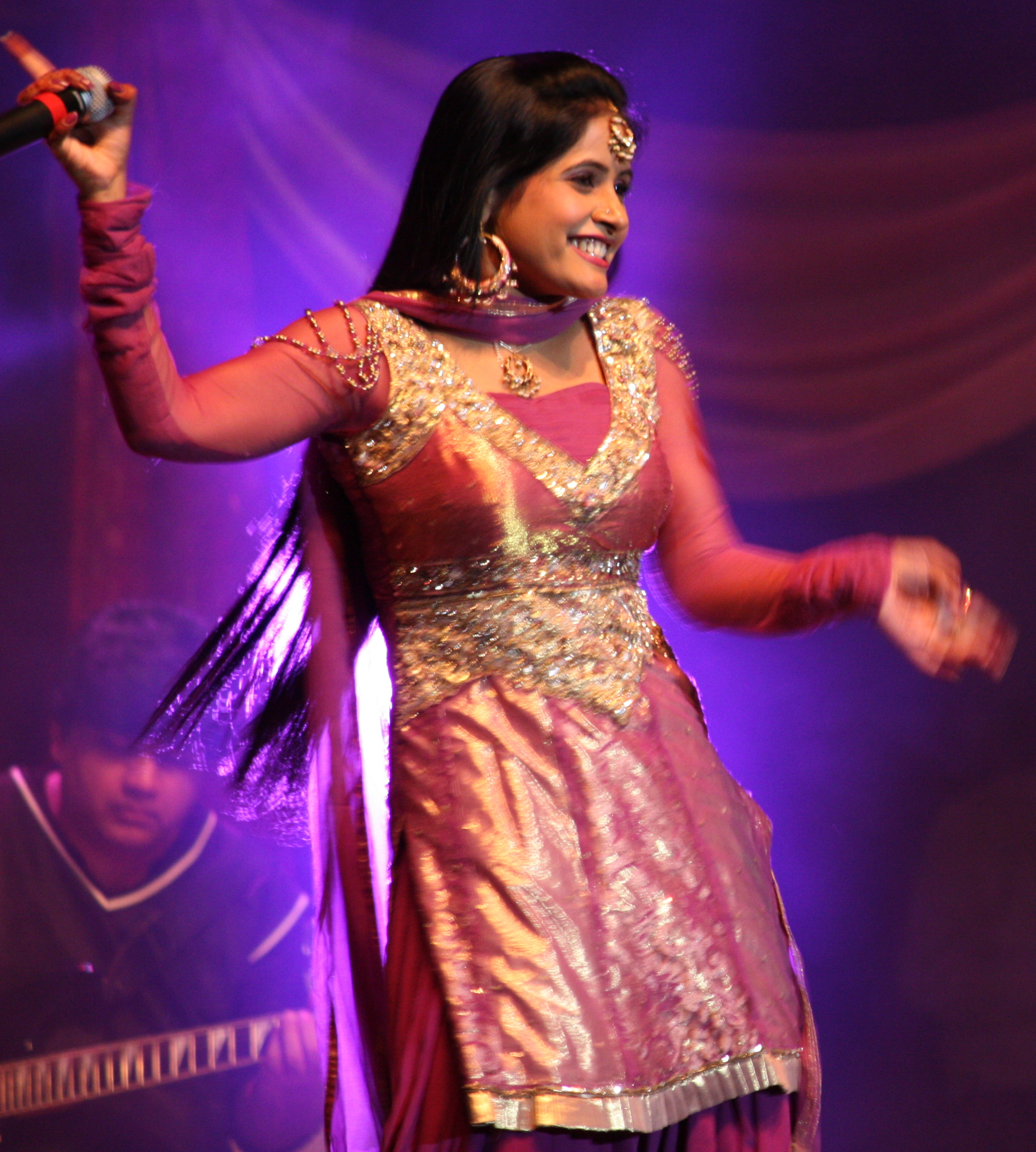
- Miss Pooja performing in August 2009

Background information
- Born: Gurinder Kaur Kainth; Rajpura, Punjab, India
- Genres: Bhangra, Pop, Folk; Religious, Hip Hop, Dance
- Occupations: Singer, Actress & Model
- Years active: 2006–present
- Spouse: Romi Tahli (m. 2010)

Gurinder Kaur Kainth, popularly known by her stage name Miss Pooja is an Indian singer and actress who primarily sings Punjabi songs in Bhangra, Pop and Folk genres. Pooja is widely known as "Duet Queen" and one of the most influential Punjabi Singer due to her energetic and Versatile style of singing.

== Personal life ==
Miss Pooja was born to Inderpal Kainth and Saroj Devi in Rajpura, Punjab. She obtained her B.A. in Vocal and Instrumental Skills from Punjabi University and pursued her M.A. in music from PGGCG Chandigarh, followed by a B.Ed. in music. She subsequently served as a music teacher at Patel Public School in Rajpura. Miss Pooja also became affiliated with the BJP and was put forth as a candidate for the Hoshiarpur Lok Sabha reserved constituency. Political analyses suggested that her candidacy was intended to appeal to the Dalit community, to which she belonged, as the constituency was reserved for Scheduled Castes. However, she refuted such claims during her briefings to news channels.

== Career ==
In 2006, Miss Pooja launched her professional career with the release of the duet song "Jaan Ton Piyari." She served as a judge on the Punjabi singing reality show, Voice of Punjab.

Her journey in the music industry began in 2006 with her debut duet "Jaan Ton Piyari". Progressing further, in 2009 she released her first solo album, Romantic Jatt, featuring the music video for her song "Do Nain", shot in Toronto, Canada.

Expanding her repertoire, Miss Pooja ventured into acting in 2010 with her roles in the films Panjaban and Channa Sachi Muchi. Continuing her multifaceted career, she released her third solo album Jattitude in 2012, accompanied by the music video for "Shona Shona", filmed in Hong Kong. Furthermore, she marked her Bollywood debut with the song "Second Hand Jawani" from the movie Cocktail.

In subsequent years, Miss Pooja continued her cinematic journey with the release of her third film, Pooja Kiven Aa in 2013, followed by Ishq Garaari.

== Discography ==
Year	Singles/Albums	Record label
2026	Pichhe Hatt	Royal Music Gang
2026	Tere Warga	Tahliwood Records
2025	Jaago Aaiya	Tahliwood Records
2024	Facetime	Channi Nattan
2024	Angreji PK	Tahliwood Records
2024	Statement	T-Series
2024	Diamond Koka	Envy Worldwide
2023	Viah	Raka Music
2021	Dj vajda	T-Series
2020	Care Ni Karda	T-Series
2019	Mehndi	T-Series
2018	The Miss Pooja Project: Volume 4	ParasiteDARK
2018	Butterfly	T-Series
2018	Parde Mein Rehne Do	Saregama
2017	Jeeeju	Speed Records
2017	Baari Baari Barsi	Speed Records
2017	Sohnea	Speed Records
2017	Pasand	Saga Music
2016	Hoor	Tahliwood Records
2016	Dimaag Khraab	Tahliwood Records
2015	Date on Ford	Tahliwood Records
2015	Paani	Tahliwood Records
2014	Painkiller	Speed Records
2013	Main Nange Pairi Nachi	T-Series
2013	The Miss Pooja Project: Volume 3	ParasiteDARK
2013	Bathinda Beats	Amar Studio
2012	Jattitude	Speed Records, Moviebox Records
2011	Jugni (Miss Pooja: Live in Concert 2)	Speed Records
2011	Breathless	Moviebox Records
2011	The Miss Pooja Project: Volume 2	ParasiteDARK
2010	The Miss Pooja Project: Volume 1	ParasiteDARK
2009	Romantic Jatt	Speed Records, Planet Recordz, Moviebox Records
2008	Miss Pooja: Live in Concert	Speed Records
2007	Queen of Duets	Lucky Star
2006	Jaan Ton Piyari	Simran Music Industries

=== Duo collaboration ===
Year	Info
2013	"Surprise" with Deep Mahala & Preet Lali "Go Crazy" with Punjabi By Nature Choice with Manjit Rupowalia
2012	"Jugni Chandigarh Di" with Deep Mahala; Aetbaar with Dark MC; Jatt Tinka with APS Tinka Gill; Gabroo with Apache Indian
2011	"Pajero" with Veer Sukhwant; Pind Wal Gera with K. Kashmir "Jeep" with Harry Mirza "Dafa Hoja" with Foji "Ruttan" with Bai Amarjit
2009	"Kothe te Speaker" with Mintu Dhuri "Mitran Di Vaari" with Pulla Labhna "Prince N Pooja" with Roshan Prince "Oh Kudi" with Juglee J "Saadgi" with Rai Jujhar "Doriya" with Kuldeep Rasila "Wrong Number" with Gurvinder Brar "Homegrown" with Punjabi by Nature "Pub Te Club" with Preet Brar
2008	"Poodna Returns" with Deep Mahala "Jhona 3" with Shinda Shonki
2007	"Hero" with Bai Amarjit "Patrol 2" with Preet Brar "Jhona 2" with Shinda Shonki Baazi with Manjit Rupowalia Chah Da Cup 2 with Babu Chandigarhia
2006	"Ek Tere Karke" with Preet Brar "Safari" with Kuldeep Rasila "Tere Jaan Banke" with Darshan Khella "Pind da Shingar" with Shinda Shonki

== Filmography ==
Year	Film name	Label	Role
2016	Housefull 3	T-Series	"Malamaal" (playback singer)
2015	Dilliwali Zaalim Girlfriend	T-Series	"Tipsy Hogai" (playback singer)
2013	Best of Luck	Speed Records	Special Appearance
2013	Ishq Garaari	Cosmic Studios	Actress
2013	Heer and Hero	Shemaroo	"Lakk Tunoo" (playback singer)
2013	Pooja Kiven AA	Saga Hits	Actress
2012	Cocktail	T-Series	"Second Hand Jawani" (playback singer)
2012	Kabaddi Once Again	T-Series	"Galvakri" (playback singer)
2010	Channa Sachi Muchi	T-Series	Actress
2010	Panjaban: Love Rules Hearts	Catrack Entertainment	Actress

== Awards and nominations ==
- In 2009 she won "Best International Act" at the UK Asian Music Awards.
- In 2010 she won "Best International Album" at the UK Asian Music Awards for Romantic Jatt.
- In 2010 she worn "Best Female Act" at the Brit Asia TV Music Awards.
- In 2011 she was nominated for "Shri Tanveer Singh Dhami ji International Act" and "Best International Album" (for Panjaban) at the UK Asian Music Awards. and ended up winning Best International Act.
- In 2011 she won PTC Punjabi Film Award Best Duet Female Film for Punjaban.
- She has made hattrick of world records in 2021 by writing her name in the Guinness Book of World Records for maximum songs sung (4500), maximum music video featured (850) & maximum music albums released (350).
- She has received the Hindustan Gaurav Award in 2021.
- She has been honoured with GLOBAL ICONIC AWARDS (DELHI) IN 2020.
- In 2018, She was the most searched female on Google.
