= Uyirodu Uyiraga =

1998 film directed by Sushma Ahuja

- DVD cover
- Directed by: Sushma Ahuja
- Written by: Sushma Ahuja
- Produced by: Sunil Mutreja; Amit Bhatia; Samer Mutreja
- Starring: Ajith Kumar; Richa Ahuja
- Cinematography: Aravind Kamalanathan
- Edited by: A. Sreekar Prasad
- Music by: Vidyasagar
- Production company: S.S Films Pvt. Limited
- Release date: 21 November 1998
- Running time: 129 minutes
- Country: India
- Language: Tamil

Uyirodu Uyiraga (transl. With life, as life) is a 1998 Indian Tamil-language romantic drama film written and directed by Sushma Ahuja (in her directorial debut). The film stars Ajith Kumar and Richa Ahuja in the lead roles, while Sarath Babu, Srividya, Ambika, and Mohan Sharma play supporting roles. The music was composed by Vidyasagar with cinematography by Aravind Kamalanathan and editing by A. Sreekar Prasad. The film revolves around a couple's struggle to deal with the husband's terminal illness. The film was released on 21 November 1998 and became a commercial failure.

== Plot ==
The film details on how the parents of a young teenage boy Ajay, who is diagnosed with a chronic brain tumor, accept and deal with his sickness. Anjali does not have a brain tumor. Anjali's undeterred love for the optimistic Ajay, who is on the verge of death, is beautifully depicted throughout the film.

== Cast ==
- Ajith Kumar as Ajay
- Richa Ahuja as Anjali
- Sarath Babu as Chandrasekhar
- Srividya as Raji, Ajay's mother
- Ambika as Anjali's mother
- Mohan Sharma as Anjali's father
- Sathyapriya as Nurse
- Devipriya as Priya
- Lavanya as Anjali's friend
- Adade Manohar

== Production ==
The director, Sushma Ahuja, originally wanted to make in Hindi but eventually filmed in Tamil with Ajith Kumar and Richa Ahuja, her daughter. Richa took up the offer, after another popular actress had opted out of the role due to date issues. Singeetham Srinivasa Rao, with whom Sushma worked on Pushpak, encouraged her to take up this project. The film was reportedly based on a real event which had occurred in the early 1990s. The film's final schedule was held at a home in Santhome.

== Soundtrack ==
The songs were composed by Vidyasagar, with lyrics by Vairamuthu.

Track listing
No.	Title	Singer(s)	Length
1.	"Anbae Anbae"	Hariharan, K. S. Chithra	5:10
2.	"I Love You"	Nandini Srikar, KK, Ajith Kumar	4:55
3.	"Nathi Enge Valaiyum"	Ghanshyam Vaswani	4:37
4.	"Nothing Nothing"	Harini	4:44
5.	"Poovukellam Siragu"	Srinivas, KK, Harini	5:27
6.	"Vannakili SolKonda"	Gopal Rao, Harini, Chorus	4:38
Total length:			29:30

== Release and reception ==
The film was initially scheduled to release on 19 October 1998 to coincide with Diwali, but was delayed by a month and released on 21 November. Kala Krishnan Ramesh from Deccan Herald drew particular praise to the role of Srividya, claiming the film was "a pleasant experience, the crowds cheered Srividya almost as much as Ajith". Ji of Kalki praised the acting of Ajith, Srividya and Sarath Babu but panned Vidyasagar's background score. The film failed commercially, with Sushma Ahuja blaming the result on poor promotion. Two years after release, the producers were given a ₹5 lakh (equivalent to ₹23 lakh or US$23,000 in 2026) subsidy by the Tamil Nadu government along with several other films.
