= Surjit Bindrakhia =

Indian singer

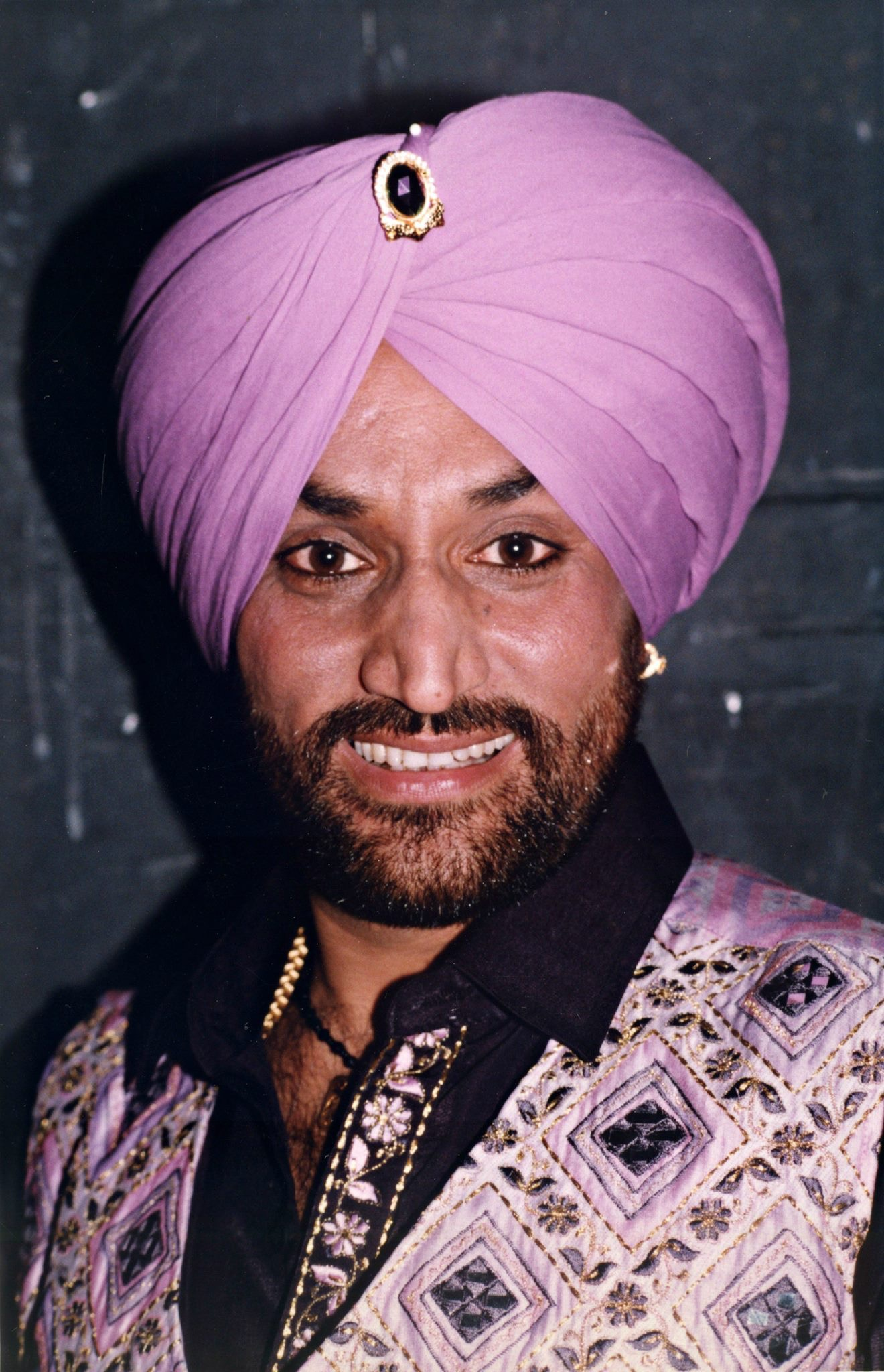

Background information
- Born: Surjit Singh Bains; 15 April 1962; Rupnagar, Punjab, India
- Origin: Bindrakh Pind (Rupnagar District) Punjab
- Died: 17 November 2003 (aged 41) Mohali, Punjab, India
- Genres: Punjabi Bhangra and Folk
- Years active: 1985–2003
- Formerly of: Gurdas Maan, Gulshan Kumar

Surjit Bains Bindrakhia (born 15 April 1962 – 17 November 2003) was a singer from Punjab, India. He was recognized for his distinctive voice and hekh, a singing technique where a note is held continuously in one breath. His biggest tracks include Meri Nath Dig Paye, Dupatta Tera Satrang Da, Lakk Tunoo Tunoo, Bas Kar Bas Kar, Mukhda Dekh Ke, Tera Yaar Bolda, and Jatt Di Pasand. Surjit is often regarded by fans and critics as one of the most influential voices in Bhangra music. He received a special jury award at the 2004 Filmfare Awards for his contribution to Punjabi music.

== Early life and family ==
Bindrakhia was born as Surjit Bains to Sucha Singh and Gurcharan Kaur in the Bindrakh village of Rupnagar district, Punjab, India.

He began his singing career by singing boliyan for his college bhangra team. He received formal training from his guru, Atul Sharma. Bindrakhia appeared in films before he was a major figure in the music industry.

Surjit Bindrakhia married Preet Bains in April 1990. The couple had two children, a son, Gitaz Bindrakhia and a daughter, Minaz Bindrakhia.

== Professional life ==
His first appearance in the Punjabi movie industry was in the film Anakh Jattan Dee, where he sang the title song, "Baniye Ne Jatt". Lyricist Shamsher Sandhu recognised his talent had and gave him an opportunity to venture into the Punjabi music industry. Most of his hit songs were written by Shamsher Sandhu and music was produced by Atul Sharma. Surjit Bindrakhia's voice was widely praised for its power and range among Bhangra singers during his career. Throaty, with a wide range of sounds, he was one of the most successful traditional artists doing the rounds of the bhangra scene during his time. Surjit had been known in Punjab for many years. His first break in the Punjabi music industry came in 1990 with the album Addi Utte Ghum, which included the track "Jugni" in which Bindrakhia performs his world record 32-second hekh. Surjit Bindrakhia is credited as being the first international superstar in bhangra music. His song, "Dupatta Tera Sat Rang Da" reportedly remained a top Punjabi track on UK charts for several weeks.

Bindrakhia was known for his high-pitched hekh, which reportedly could last up to 42 seconds. While other singers have attempted similar vocal techniques, Bindrakhia's style remains distinctive. His singing style worked with the beat, so you would find him pausing along with the dhol and raising and shifting into different keys as the dhol does. All of this gave Bindrakhia the air of a child gone a little mad with his voice. Bindrakhia is often credited as an influential figure in bridging traditional Punjabi folk music and modern Punjabi pop.

== Death ==
Reports indicated that Surjit experienced health issues in the later stages of his life. He had been hospitalised multiple times. Due to a sudden decline in health, Surjit Bindrakhia died from a silent heart attack cardiac arrest on the morning of 17 November 2003 at his home in Phase-7, Mohali.

Prominent Punjabi artists and singers attended his bhog and funeral at Bindrakhia's native village Bindrakh. Some of the artists who turned up to pay their last respects to the legend included Sardool Sikander, Hans Raj Hans, Gurpreet Ghuggi, Babbu Maan, Gurdas Maan his lyricist and a close friend Shamsher Singh Sandhu, and his guru and music composer Atul Sharma.

== Legacy ==
Bindrakhia stormed the market with over 250 million hit sales, out of which 175 million came from India alone. He later collaborated with artists such as Surinder Shinda while performing live sets.

Punjabi singer Babbu Maan paid respects to Bindrakhia's family and in his 2005 album Pyaas, pays tribute with a song dedicated to Bindrakhia titled "Pind Diyan Juhaan". In 2011, DJ Harvey and Nirmal Sidhu made a tribute song to Surjit Bindrakhia called "Bindrakhia Boliyan", which has been a huge success since its release being ranked at Number 1 on the BBC Asian Network Chart in the first week of release.

In 2018, DJ and music producer DJ Frenzy released a remix track of the hit song "Mundri Nishani". This remix was part of a series of various Bindrakhia tracks reimagined by the DJ. The first track itself has been a huge success and has been widely received by fans.

Some of his songs like "Tera Yaar Bolda", "Lak Tanoo Tanoo", "Jatt Di Pasand" are considered indispensable for any wedding in the northern part of India and can be heard even today.

== Discography ==
=== Studio albums ===
Release	Album	Record label	Notes
1989	Munde Aakhde Pataka	Finetone	
1990	Addi Utte Ghum	Catrack Entertainment	
1990	Gal Das De Dil Di	DMC Records LTD	
1991	Munda Ki Mangda	Super Cassettes Industries T-Series	Re-released by Super Cassettes Industries T-Series on 22/05/00
1992	Loki Kehandey Bas Kar Bas Kar	Super Cassettes Industries T-Series	Re-released by Super Cassettes Industries T-Series on 22/05/00
1993	Gabhru Gulab Warga	Super Cassettes Industries T-Series	Re-released by Super Cassettes Industries T-Series on 24/05/00
1993	Labh Kiton Bhabiye	Super Cassettes Industries T-Series	Re-released by Super Cassettes Industries T-Series on 01/01/96
1994	Dupatta Tera Sat Rang Da	DMC Records LTD	Re-released by Super Cassettes Industries T-Series on 04/05/00
1994	Mundri Nishani	Super Cassettes Industries T-Series	Re-released by Super Cassettes Industries T-Series on 01/06/00
1994	Phullan Wangoo Hasdiye Kudiye	Super Cassettes Industries T-Series	
1995	Laadla Deor	Super Cassettes Industries T-Series	Re-released by Super Cassettes Industries T-Series on 16/06/00
1995	Rumaal Bhul Gayee	Super Cassettes Industries T-Series	Re-released by Super Cassettes Industries T-Series on 17/05/00
1996	Dil Watte Dil Mangda	Super Cassettes Industries T-Series	
1996	Sohni Naar	Super Cassettes Industries T-Series	
1996	Tauba Tauba Sohneyan Da Husn Kamaal	Super Cassettes Industries T-Series	Re-released by Super Cassettes Industries T-Series on 24/05/00
1997	Tera Vikda Jai Kure Pani	Super Cassettes Industries T-Series	
1997	Jawani Aa Gayee Oye	Tips	
1998	Phul Kadha Phulkari	Super Cassettes Industries T-Series	
1998	Wang Wargi Kuri	Super Cassettes Industries T-Series	
1999	Mukhda Dekh Ke	Super Cassettes Industries T-Series	
2000	Lakk Tunoo Tunoo	Super Cassettes Industries T-Series	
2001	Billiyaan Akhiyaan	Super Cassettes Industries T-Series	
2002	Dilaan Diyaan Choriyaan	Super Cassettes Industries T-Series	
2003	Ishque Di Aag	Super Cassettes Industries T-Series	

=== Posthumous albums ===
Release	Album	Record label	Notes
2004	Galti Malti Maaf Kar Deo	Super Cassettes Industries T-Series	
2005	Pyar Kar Lai	Music Waves	

=== Religious albums ===
Release	Album	Record label	Notes
1992	Kamban Dil Gaddaran De	Super Cassettes Industries T-Series	Re-released by Super Cassettes Industries T-Series on 22 June 2000
1999	Janam Dihara Khalse Da	Super Cassettes Industries T-Series	
2001	Singho Sewadar Bano	Super Cassettes Industries T-Series	

=== Compilation albums ===
Release	Album	Song	Record label	Notes
1996	Mitran Noo Maar Gia (New Year Program 1996)	Aedron Rumaal Hiliya	DMC Records LTD	
1997	Mela Meliyan Da (New Year Program 1997)	Kannan Wich Ghungroo	Super Cassettes Industries T-Series	
1998	Mela Vaishakhi Da	Patasian Nu Bhordi	Super Cassettes Industries T-Series	
1998	Jhanjhar Di Chhankar (New Year Program 1999)	Moda Maar Ke	Super Cassettes Industries T-Series}	
1999	Koke Da Lishkara	Khul Gaya Jalebi Juda	Super Cassettes Industries T-Series	
1999	Phulkari (New Year Program 2000)	Tera Yaar Bolda and Jhanjar Patlo Di	Super Cassettes Industries T-Series	
2000	Dupatta	Dupatta Tera Sat Rang Da (Remake) and Nakhro	Super Cassettes Industries T-Series	
2001	Mela Geetan Da (New Year Program 2001)	Wangg Hogi Tangg and Malang Baniye	Super Cassettes Industries T-Series	
2001	Dhol Wajda (Vaisakhi Program 2001)	Dil Vakh Rove	Super Cassettes Industries T-Series	
2001	Boli Pa Mitra (New Year Program 2002)	Khitton Sikheya Matak Naal Turna	Super Cassettes Industries T-Series	
2002	Mittran Da Chhalla	Mittran Da Chhalla and Aedron Rumaal Hiliya (Remake)	Super Cassettes Industries T-Series	
2002	Giddhe Vich Vajdi Addi (New Year Program 2003)	Giddhe Vich Vajdi Addi and Ikk Akh Toonahari	Super Cassettes Industries T-Series	
2003	Guldasta Geetaan Da (New Year Program 2004)	Udoon Udoon Kardi Jawani	Super Cassettes Industries T-Series	

=== Film soundtracks ===
Release	Film	Song	Record label
1989	Anakh Jattan Dee	"Baniye Ne Jatt"	Finetone
1991	Jatt Jeona Mour	"Baba Banda Singh"	Finetone
1991	Badla Jatti Da	"Boliyan" with Surinder Shinda	Finetone
1994	Kachehri	"Dera Jatt Da" with Dilshad Akhtar	Super Cassettes Industries T-Series
1996	Zorawar	"Ve Kehre Tere Amb Torh Laye" with Parmjit Sandhu	Catrack
1996	Rab Dian Rakhan	"Khera Tera Nahion Chandna"	Super Cassettes Industries T-Series
1998	Ishq Nachavye Gali Gali	"Char Din Mitteran Ne"	Catrack
2026	Dhurandhar: The Revenge	"Baari Barsi"	T-Series
