= Yaariyan (2008 film) =

- Theatrical poster
- Directed by: Deepak Grewal
- Produced by: Pinky Basrao
- Starring: Gurdas Mann; Bhumika Chawla
- Cinematography: Kapil K.Gautam
- Edited by: Bunty Nagi
- Music by: Score: Jaidev Kumar; Songs: Jaidev Kumar; Onkar; Aadesh Shrivastava; Sachin Ahuja
- Distributed by: Pinky Basrao Films; Bollywood Films (UK)
- Release date: 25 January 2008
- Country: India
- Language: Punjabi

Yaariyan is a 2008 Indian Punjabi film, produced by Pinky Basrao starring Gurdas Maan as the male lead and Bhumika Chawla playing his love interest. Directed by Deepak Grewal, the film also stars Om Puri and Gulshan Grover. There is also a special appearance by Asrani.

== Plot ==
Jasawar (Gurdas Mann) a lawyer from Punjab comes to Canada to work as a lawyer, but was unable to work as a lawyer and does other jobs. He falls in love with Simran (Bhumika Chawla). He gets involved in an accident and plots an easy money case along with his helping hand Khanna, Gulshan Grover. He later finds out that the driver he was suing was the uncle of his lover yet he continues to sue him.

== Cast ==
- Gurdas Mann as Jasawar
- Bhumika Chawla as Simran
- Gulshan Grover as Baldev Raj Khanna
- Rana Jung Bahadur
- Om Puri as Jagbal Bir Singh
- Asrani as Dr. Palta (special appearance)
- Farida Jalal (special appearance)
- Harjinder Singh Thind (guest appearance)
- Okuku W. Wanyama
- Raj Toora

== Music ==
Jaidev Kumar, Sachin Ahuja, Aadesh Shrivastava and Onkar composed the music while the film score is composed by Jaidev Kumar. The music was released on Universal Music Group.

Song	Singer(s)	Lyrics
"Yaariyan"	Gurdas Mann & Sukhwinder Singh	
"Wajda Tunak Tunak Ik Tara"	Gurdas Mann	
"Bada Kuchh Kehna Hai"	Sonu Nigam & Tarannum Mallik	
"Watno Door Lage Ne Mele"	Gurdas Mann, Alka Yagnik & Feroz Khan	
"Ki Aye Kise Da Kasoor"	Sadhana Sargam	
"Cmon Cmon" (Bonus Track)	Sonu Nigam & Alisha Chinoy	
"Yaariyan" (Remix)	Gurdas Mann & Sukhwinder Singh	
"Time Chakna"		
