= Mehsampur =

Mehsampur ਮਹਿਸਮਪੁਰ
- Village
- Location in Punjab, India Mehsampur (India)
- Coordinates: 31.025721°N 75.5001220°E
- Country: India
- State: Punjab
- District: Jalandhar

Government
  - Type: Panchayat raj
  - Body: Gram panchayat
- Elevation: 240 m (790 ft)

Population (2011)
  - Total: 1,634
- Sex ratio 810/824 ♂/♀

Languages
  - Official: Punjabi
- Time zone: UTC+5:30 (IST)
- PIN: 144035
- Telephone: 01824
- ISO 3166 code: IN-PB
- Vehicle registration: PB- 08
- Post Office: Partappura
- Website: jalandhar.nic.in

Mehsampur (Punjabi: ਮਹਿਸਮਪੁਰ) is a village in Jalandhar district of Punjab State, India. It is located 16 km from Nakodar, 31 km from Phillaur, 40 km from the district headquarters Jalandhar and 140 km from the state capital Chandigarh. The village is administered by a sarpanch who is an elected representative of the village as per Panchayati raj in India.

== Education ==
The village has a Punjabi medium, co-ed upper primary with secondary/higher secondary school (GHS Mehsampur). The school provide mid-day meal as per Indian Midday Meal Scheme and the meal is prepared in school premises and it was found in 1975.

== Demography ==
According to the report published by Census India in 2011, Mehsampur has a total number of 351 houses and population of 1634 of which include 810 males and 824 females. Literacy rate of Mehsampur is 77.13%, higher than state average of 75.84%. The population of children under the age of 6 years is 178 which is 10.89% of total population of Mehsampur, and child sex ratio is approximately 935 higher than state average of 846.

Most of the people are from Schedule Caste which constitutes 50.80% of total population in Mehsampur. The town does not have any Schedule Tribe population so far.

As per census 2011, 469 people were engaged in work activities out of the total population of Mehsampur which includes 412 males and 57 females. According to census survey report 2011, 86.57% workers describe their work as main work and 13.43% workers are involved in marginal activity providing livelihood for less than 6 months.

== Transport ==
Partabpura railway station is the nearest train station; however, Phillaur Junction train station is 8.3 km away from the village. The village is 59 km away from domestic airport in Ludhiana and the nearest international airport is located in Chandigarh also Sri Guru Ram Dass Jee International Airport is the second nearest airport which is 130 km away in Amritsar. Mehsampur has proposed plans of building an airport which has been submitted to Punjab Govt. If Successful airport works will begin in early 2023.

== History ==
Iconic Bhangra artist Mehsopuria takes the name of this village, where his late father was born.

Singer Amar Singh Chamkila was assassinated in the village in 1988.
