= Pooja Kiven AA =

Pooja.. Kiven Aa..???
- Directed by: Nidhi Sharma
- Written by: Manbhavan Singh
- Produced by: Romi Tahli
- Starring: Miss Pooja; Tarun Khanna; Sahil; Raj Singh; B.N. Sharma; Manoj Joshi; Sardar Sohi; Anshu Sawhney (Preeto)
- Cinematography: Tappan Vyas
- Edited by: Steven Bernard
- Music by: Sachin Ahuja
- Release date: 22 March 2013
- Language: Punjabi
- Budget: ₹40 million (US$470,000)

Pooja Kiven Aa is a 2013 Punjabi comedy film directed by Nidhi Sharma and produced by Romi Tahli. The film stars Miss Pooja, Tarun Khanna, Sahil Vedoliyaa and Raj Jhinger

== Plot ==
Pooja is a non-resident Indian from the UK. She visits Mumbai to sell her estate; she owns a very large bungalow.

When Bhinder, Deep and Jeet head to Mumbai in search of work, they meet Pooja, who employs them as cooks, trainers and cleaners. The trio fall in love with Pooja at first sight. Later on, Jeet and Bhinder lose interest in each other. Pooja's uncle (B.N. Sharma) tries to cheat her out of her property.

== Crew ==
- Director: Nidhi Sharma
- Producer: Romi Tahli
- Screenplay: Manbhavan Singh
- Music: Sachin Ahuja
- Lyrics: Jaggi Singh
- Editor: Steven Bernard
- Visual Promotion: Imtiaz Alam
- Cinematography: Tappan Vyas
- Choreography: Devendra Chaturvedi
- Promotion: Alchemy Events
- Associate director: Satinder Singh Dev
- Chief Assistant director: Sahil Dev
- 1st Assistant director: Pankaj verma

== Production ==
Shooting began on 22 October 2012 and wrapped on 23 November 2012. The major locations were in Chandigarh, Goa and Mumbai, India. The film was shot with an Arriflex digital camera. Ahuja produced eight tracks with singers Miss Pooja, Mika Singh, Jelly, Rickie Rix (Miss Pooja's brother) and Master Saleem. Photographer Feroz Khan and Manjot (Late Night Studios) were involved with publicity.

== Reception ==
The film received poor critical reception. "The movie is the definition of chaos," said Punjabi Media. Ballewood.in praised Pooja and made positive comments about performances, especially those by Tarun Khanna and Sahil Vedoliyaa, but found the movie's plot and screenplay disappointing: "This film provides an ample scope for criticism; however, there were some good performances. Some good music would probably have saved the movie from falling flat at the box office."

== Soundtrack ==
Track	Song	Singer	Music Video
01	"Peepni"	Rickie Rix	Watch Video
02	"Pooja Kiven Aa"	Miss Pooja	Watch Video
03	"Pappi"	Miss Pooja	Watch Video
04	"Shayad Eh Pyaar"	Kunal Ganjawala	Watch Video
05	"Ludhiyane"	Sukhpreet Singh Kalkat	
06	"Peen Do Ji"	Master Saleem	Watch Video
07	"Duniya Ton Chori"	Miss Pooja	Watch Video
08	"Kuwaara Kehnde Ne"	Miss Pooja	Watch Video
09	"Shayad Eh Pyaar" (Remix)	Rickie Rix	Watch Video
