= Dugri =

Dugri 2 ghari (meaning 2 houses)
- Village
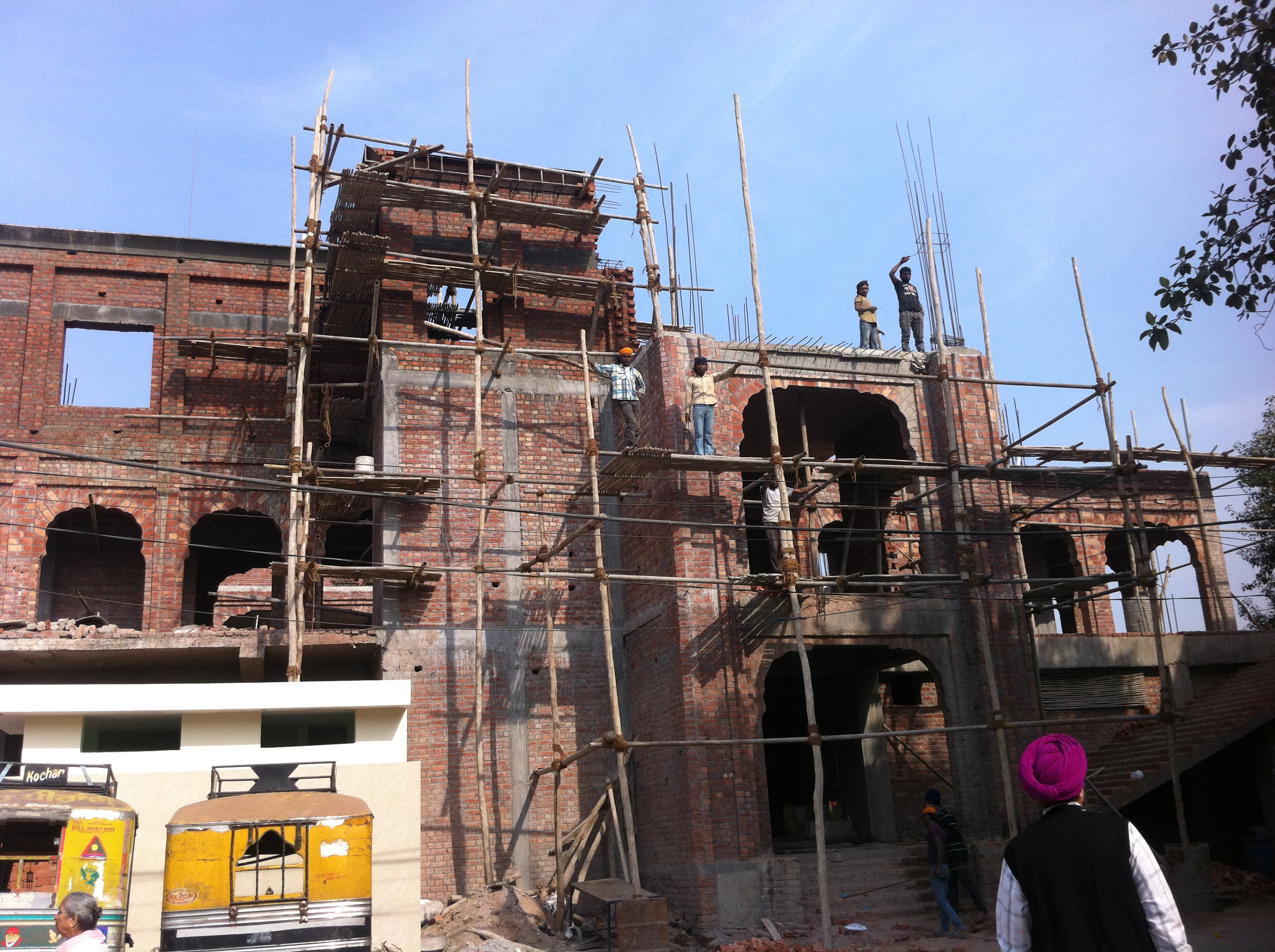
- Historical Gurudwara Sahib at Dugri village near Urban Estate

- Location in Punjab, India Dugri (India)
- Coordinates: 30°34′N 76°00′E
- Country: India
- State: Punjab
- District: Ludhiana

Languages
  - Official: Punjabi
- Time zone: UTC+5:30 (IST)
- PIN: 141012
- Vehicle registration: PB-10
- Nearest city: Ludhiana
- Avg. summer temperature: 35 °C (95 °F)
- Avg. winter temperature: 10 °C (50 °F)

Dugri is a village in the Indian state of Punjab.

Dugri is clustered around the village center Gurudwara Damdama Sahib, which is the holiest Gurdwara of Sikhism in the neighborhood. The Gurudwara was established after Guru Nanak Dev Ji and Guru Hargobind ji visited. It has temples such as Sheetla Mata Mandir situated right near the entrance to the village.

The village falls under ward 61 administered by councillor Rakhwinder Singh.

== Notable people ==
- Amar Singh Chamkila, singer
- Nirmal Singh Maharaj alias Guruji, spiritual leader
