= Charanjit Ahuja =

Indian composer (1953–2025)

Charanjit ahuja
- Born: 29 November 1953
- Died: 21 September 2025 (aged 71); Mohali, Punjab, India
- Occupations: Music producer Music composer
- Children: Sachin Ahuja

Charanjit Ahuja (29 November 1953 – 21 September 2025) was an Indian Punjabi music composer, producer and mentor. He worked across albums and films in the Punjabi language, and his career spanned from the LP and cassette era into modern recording formats.

== Career ==
Ahuja is credited with composing musical tracks for a number of Punjabi films and albums. Among his better-known compositions are “Kee Banu Duniyan Da” (1986), “Gabhroo Punjab Da” (1986) and “Dushmani Jattan Di” (1993). He collaborated with prominent singers and stage artists, including Amar Singh Chamkila, Gurdas Mann, Sardool Sikander, and others. In later years, Ahuja remained active; in 2015 he collaborated with Durga Rangila on a track titled “Khalsa Aid,” aimed at supporting humanitarian efforts.

== Illness and death ==
According to media reports, Ahuja had been suffering from cancer (some accounts refer to throat cancer or liver cancer) and was receiving medical care at PGI Chandigarh. He died on 21 September 2025 at his residence in Mohali. He was survived by his wife, Sangeeta Ahuja, and his sons, including Sachin Ahuja, who also is a music producer.

== Legacy ==
His passing elicited tributes from the Punjabi music community and public officials. He is remembered in coverage as having contributed to Punjabi music’s stylistic evolution, and as a figure who supported emerging talent.

== Selected works ==
- “Kee Banu Duniyan Da” (1986)
- “Gabhroo Punjab Da” (1986)
- “Dushmani Jattan Di” (1993)
