= Sameh Zakout =

Palestinian rapper (born 1987)

Sameh 'SAZ' Zakout
- سامح زقوت
- Born: 1987 (age 38–39)
- Occupations: Rapper and actor
- Known for: DUGRI

Sameh Zakout (Arabic: سامح زقوت, born 1987) better known by his stage name SAZ, is a Palestinian rapper from Ramla, Israel. His music features themes of Palestinian and Arab identity and calls for peaceful resolution of Arab–Israeli conflict. He was the subject of the 2006 documentary Saz: The Palestinian Rapper for Change.

Zakout gained attention and popularity as a contestant on the Israeli reality singing competition Chai be La La Land in 2012.

== Acting work ==
Zakout's first acting role was as Amir in the 2016 film Junction 48, directed by Udi Aloni. In 2018, Zakout played Hummus Guy #1 in Sameh Zoabi's Tel Aviv on Fire.

== Dugri and "Let's talk straight" ==
In 2021, Zakout collaborated with Israeli rapper Uriya Rosenman to create the video "Let's talk straight | בוא נדבר דוגרי | تعال نحكي دغري". The video went viral during Israel's 2021 bombardment of Gaza. Zakout and Rosenman started touring as the duo Dugri. Translated into English, the word dugri means 'straight' and may refer to the type straight speech of Israeli sabras. The duo posted a second single, 'Munfas', to YouTube in November 2021.
