= Durga Rangila =

Durga Rangila is an Indian singer songwriter associated with Punjabi language music.

== Discography ==
Kali Gani Mitran Di

- Pith Te War
- Kali Gani Mitran Di
- Dil Mere Diyan
- Gut Nachdi Di
- Haye Ni Munda
- Gandasi Khadke
- Tera Nachana
- Luk Luk Rovengi

Na Layo Na Layo

- Heer Ranjha
- Tota Kee Mangda
- Dil Marda Tere Te
- Nibhayian Kiven Jandian
- Kurian Kuwariyan
- Borh Diyan Shaavan
- Kaale Pani Warga
- Na Layo Na Layo

Noor Tere Naina Da

- Mirza
- Pind Pekeyan De
- Ishqe Da Kais
- Khufia Jashan
- Noor Tere Naina Da
- Tainu Vaasta Eh
- Marhi Te Deeva
- Pehli Peengh

Sad Songs - Vol : 8

- Marhi Te Deeve
- Chaale Haale Garian De
- 08 Rab Varga Se Tera Yaar
- Tu Vakh Roven
- Luk Luk Rovengi
- Dil Mere Diya Pidan
- Pith Te Jine Waar
- Heer Ranjha
- Nibhaiyan Kiven Jandiyan
- Kale Paani

Ji Ve Sohnia Ji

- Doli Chakio Kaharo
- Behja Sohniye
- Sajna Chad De Pochey Paune
- Nanke Mail Vich Aaye
- Ji Ve Sohnia Ji
- Kudi Majajan Ne
- Phone Karia Karungi

Na Layo Na Layo

- Kaale Pani Warga.
- Kurian Kuwarai
- Tota Ki Mangda
- Nibhaiyan Kiven Jandian
- Dil Marda Tere Te
- Heer Ranjha
- Borh Diyan Shavan
- Na Layo Na Layo
- Heer Ranjha
- Dil Marda Tere Te
- Nibhaiyan Kiven Jandian
- Tota Ki Mangda
- Kurian Kuwarai
- Kaale Pani Warga
- Borh Diyan Shavan
- Na Layo Na Layo

Shaheed Udham Singh (film)

- Song -"Zaat" : Inaugural Song filmed on Amrish Puri & Raj Babbar

Khalsa Aid

- Released in Feb-2015, Rangila featured in song for a Khalsa Aid event along with Punjabi musician Charanjit Ahuja.
