= London Women's Clinic =

Coordinates: 51.5214°N 0.1483°W

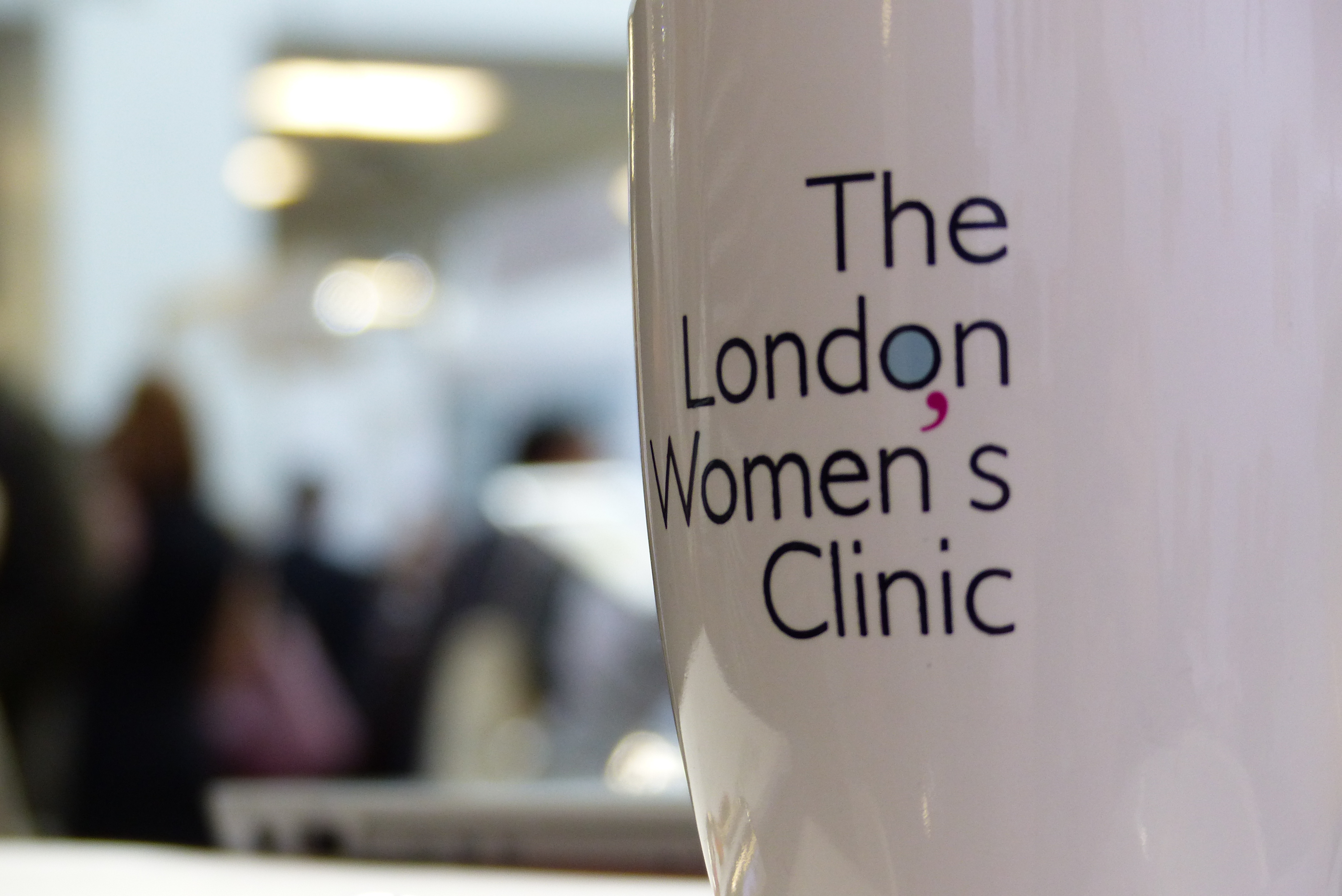
London Women's Clinic at the Fertility Show 2016

The London Women's Clinic is a private healthcare centre situated in London's Harley Street. Owned by Dr Kamal Ahuja, and founded in 1992, the centre has a reputation for helping single women and lesbian couples conceive with a total of over 85% of patients at its London clinic being in one of these categories.The clinic is closely associated with the London Sperm Bank and the London Egg Bank.

== Directors ==
Dr Kamal Ahuja is the company Director and HFEA Licence Holder for the London Women's Clinic In the 1990s Dr Kamal Ahuja, who was a former research student of IVF physiologist Robert Edwards, pioneered egg sharing at the London Women's Clinic.

== Controversies ==
In 2014 the Clinic admitted that it had failed in its duty of care to a client who was given sperm that was incorrectly screened as 'normal' when it was known to be 'abnormal'. LWC reached an out of Court settlement with the affected family. The clinic, was warned by the HFEA after inspectors found LWC staff failed to carry out "a number of witnessing stages", vital to ensure sperm is screened correctly.
