= Amarjot Kaur =

Indian statistician

- Education: Panjab University
- Occupation: Statistician
- Employer: Merck Research Laboratories
- Title: Executive Director of Clinical Biostatistics and Research Decision Sciences at Merck Research Laboratories
- Awards: Fellow of the American Statistical Association (2014) and recipient of the American Statistical Association's Founders Award (2023)

Amarjot Kaur is an Indian statistician who, in 2016, became the president of the International Indian Statistical Association. She works for Merck Research Laboratories, as Executive Director of Clinical Biostatistics and Research Decision Sciences. She is also the 2017 treasurer of the American Statistical Association, and in 2013 she chaired the American Statistical Association Community of Applied Statisticians.

Before joining Merck, Kaur earned her Ph.D. at Panjab University in Chandigarh, India, where she also worked as a lecturer. At Panjab, in the 1990s, Kaur published research in mathematical statistics on tests for stochastic dominance.^{[T2O]} She joined Merck after postdoctoral research at Pennsylvania State University. At Merck, she became the chief statistician on the Multinational Etoricoxib and Diclofenac Arthritis Long-term (MEDAL) programme, a large international study of treatments for arthritis.^{[CVO]}

In 2014, she was elected to be a Fellow of the American Statistical Association. In 2023 Kaur was the recipient of the American Statistical Association's Founders Award.

== Selected publications ==
T2O.	Kaur, Amarjot; Rao, B. L. S. Prakasa; Singh, Harshinder (December 1994), "Testing for second-order stochastic dominance of two distributions", Econometric Theory, 10 (5): 849–866, doi:10.1017/S0266466600008884, JSTOR 3532856, S2CID 120516536

CVO.	Cannon, Christopher P; Curtis, Sean P; FitzGerald, Garret A; Krum, Henry; Kaur, Amarjot; Bolognese, James A; Reicin, Alise S; Bombardier, Claire; Weinblatt, Michael E; Van Der Heijde, Désirée; et al. (MEDAL programme steering committee) (2006), "Cardiovascular outcomes with etoricoxib and diclofenac in patients with osteoarthritis and rheumatoid arthritis in the Multinational Etoricoxib and Diclofenac Arthritis Long-term (MEDAL) programme: a randomised comparison", The Lancet, 368 (9549): 1771–1781, doi:10.1016/S0140-6736(06)69666-9, PMID 17113426, S2CID 18464206
