= Sushma Ahuja =

Indian director, writer and actor

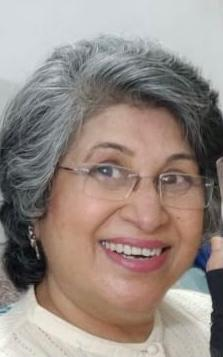
- Born: Sushmaa Roshan Ahuja; 18 August 1952 (age 74); Delhi
- Occupations: Director, screenwriter, documentary filmmaker, lyricist, and playwright
- Years active: 1969-present
- Spouse: Sudhir Ahuja (married 1971-present)
- Children: 3, including Richa Ahuja
- Parent: Roshan Lal Sharma

Sushma Ahuja is an Indian director, writer and actor who has worked on Hindi, English and Tamil films and plays.

== Career ==
Sushma began her career as a singer with All India Radio and a dancer during her teenage years, before becoming involved in the Hindi theatre circuit, where she worked on Hindi, Urdu and Punjabi performances. In 1977, Sushma relocated to Madras with her family as a result of her husband's job, and then worked closely with a theatre group called "Abhudhay", which performed Hindi, Tamil and English shows. She became acquainted with film makers including Singeetham Srinivasa Rao and L. V. Prasad who encouraged her to take up film direction, so she subsequently apprenticed under Balu Mahendra, T. Rama Rao and Yash Chopra on a number of films.

Sushma regularly helped work on Hindi versions of Tamil films, often transliterating dialogues. She was also credited for assisting actress Sridevi in her transition to work in Hindi films by helping her with Hindi dialogues.

Sushmaa has been credited as an actress, writer and director in films. Notably, she directed an animated series titled Tara Ki Duniya for DD Metro, and Uyirodu Uyiraga (1998), a romantic drama featuring Ajith Kumar and her daughter Richa Ahuja. The film released to positive reviews, with a critic noting that the film was "a clean movie with no masala stuff" but criticized the "weak story-line". Another critic drew particular praise to the role of Srividya, claiming the film was "a pleasant experience, the crowds cheered Srividya almost as much as Ajith". The film failed commercially, with Sushma Ahuja blaming the result on poor promotion. She has worked on the script for films including Little John (2001) and Ek Alag Mausam (2003). Her acting roles include appearances in M. Night Shyamalan's English film Praying with Anger (1992) and Sridevi's television series Malini Iyer (2004).

== Personal life ==
Sushma Ahuja has 3 children, Saurabh, Richa, who has appeared in films such as Uyirodu Uyiraga (1998) and Dumm Dumm Dumm (2001), and Suhaas Ahuja.

== Partial filmography ==
- Note: All films are in Hindi, unless otherwise noted.

=== As actor ===
Year	Film	Role	Notes
1980	Yeh Kaisa Insaf?	Kamla	
1988	Khatron Ke Khiladi		
1992	Praying with Anger	Mrs Mohan	English film
1996	Aur Ek Prem Kahani	Neelu Nath	
2004	Malini Iyer		Television series

=== As writer and director ===
Year	Film	Credited for		Notes	Ref.
Year	Film	Writer	Director	Notes	Ref.
1998	Uyirodu Uyiraga	Yes	Yes	Tamil film	
2001	Little John	Dialogue		Hindi version only	
2003	Ek Alag Mausam	Yes		Also lyricist	
2005	Pyaar Mein Twist	Yes			
2006	Jai Santoshi Maa	Yes			
