= Jagdish Lal Ahuja =

Indian social worker (died 2021)

- Born: Chandigarh, India
- Known for: Social work
- Awards: Padma Shri

Jagdish Lal Ahuja, popularly known as Langar Baba (1930s – 29 November 2021), was a social worker from Chandigarh, India. He was known for offering free meals for hungry and poor people. In 2020, he was awarded the Padma Shri, fourth highest civilian award of India, for his contributions in social work.

== Early life ==
Ahuja migrated to the Dominion of India from Peshawar, Dominion of Pakistan, at the age of 12 following the Partition of India. His family took refuge in Patiala and then in Amritsar and Mansa.

== Social work ==
Ahuja served the poor and hungry people by organising Langar daily for 2,500 people. He started organising langar at the Postgraduate Institute of Medical Education and Research, Chandigarh in January 2000 when he was admitted there for treatment of cancer. He later offered free meals at the Government Medical College and Hospital, sector 32, Chandigarh as well.

He offered free meals to people for the last 19 years prior to his death. He sold a chunk of his 36 acres farm, a 9-acre farm, a plot of one kanal in Panchkula, and a couple of showrooms to fund the free meals.

== Recognition ==
Ahuja was conferred the Padma Shri, fourth highest civilian award of India, in the field of social work on 26 January 2020.
