= Preet Brar =

- Born: Preet Singh Brar
- Genres: Bhangra
- Occupation: Singer
- Years active: 2003–present
- Label: Unsigned (India)

Preet Brar is a Punjabi musician. He incorporates many humorous elements into most of his songs. He is originally from Ganganagar, Rajasthan, India.

== Discography ==
Year	Album	Record label
2010	Mehboob	T-Series
2011	Rise of Jatt	Simran Music industries (SMI)
2013	Teri Yari karke	Simran Music industries (SMI)

== Religious ==
Year	Album	Record label
2010	Babe Nanak Ne	T-Series

== Duo Collaboration ==
Year	Album	Record label	Notes
2010	Jatt Phatte Chak	Vanjhali Recordz	with Amrit Brar
2009	Pub Te Club	Speed Records	with Miss Pooja
2008	Poodna Returns	T-Series	with Miss Pooja
2007	Petrol 2	Simran Music Industries/Golden Star Video	with Miss Pooja
2006	Ek Tere Karke	Simran Music Industries	with Miss Pooja
2006	Tere Jehi Kudhi	Simran Music Industries	with Gurlej Akhtar

== Compilation ==
Year	Album	Record label
2009	Jatta Ayee Vaisakhi	Spine Records

== Singles ==
Year	Song	Album	Music	Label
2014	Va Vai Va	Transylvania	Atul Sharma	T-Series
2003	Nachdi Nachdi Aa	Bhangra: Original Punjabi Pop		T-Series
