= Naman Ahuja =

Indian historian (born 1974)

Naman P. Ahuja
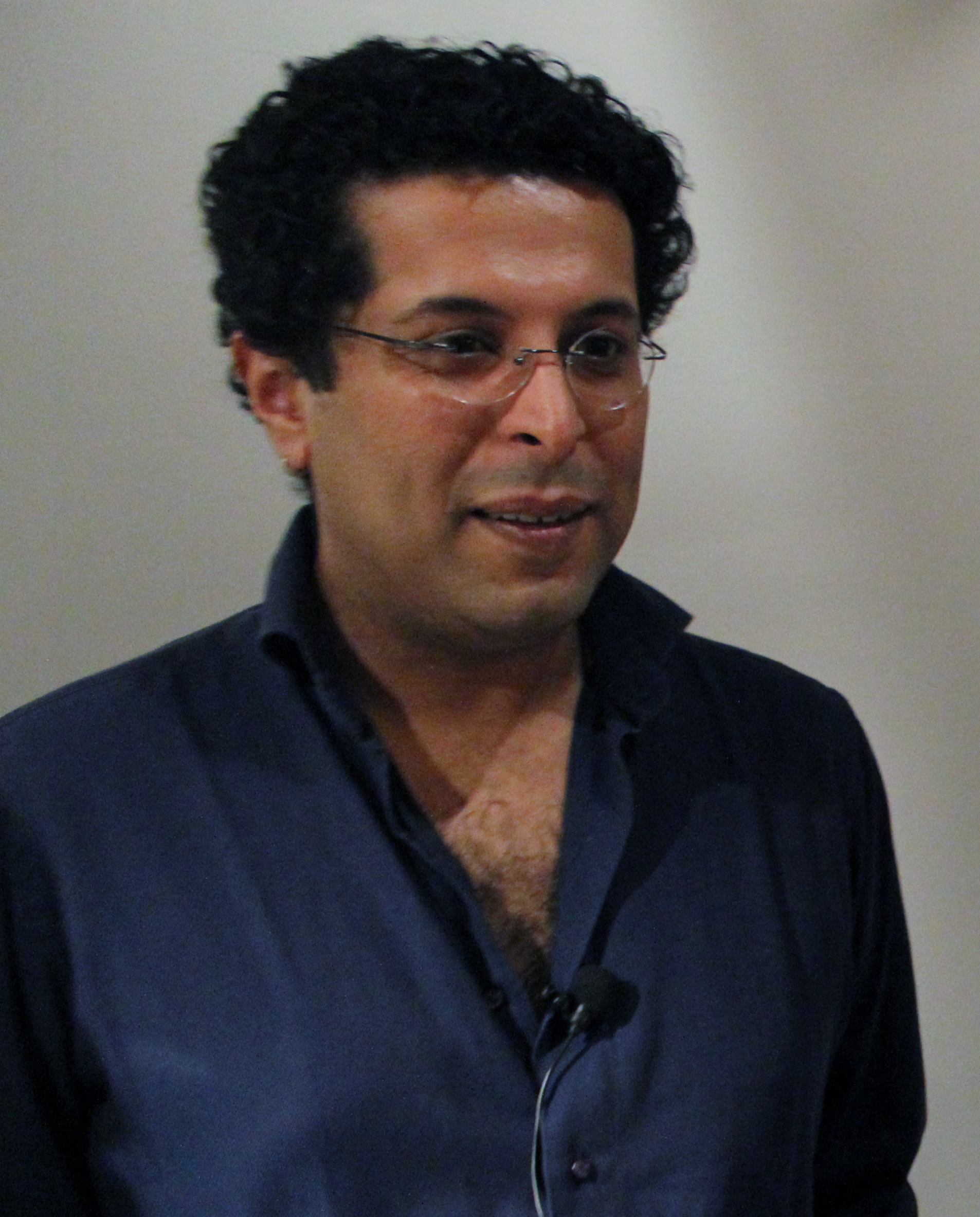
- Naman Ahuja in 2014
- Born: 1974 (age 51–52)
- Education: School of Oriental and African Studies, University of London
- Occupation: Indian Art Historian
- Known for: Ancient history, curating The Body in Indian Art and Thought exhibition
- Notable work: Jawaharlal Nehru University
- Website: www.indianiconography.info

Naman Parmeshwar Ahuja (born 1974) is an Indian art historian and curator based in New Delhi. He is Professor of Indian Art and Architecture at Jawaharlal Nehru University, where his research and teaching focus on Indian iconography and sculpture, temple architecture and Sultanate-period painting. His studies on privately owned objects—terracottas, ivories and small finds—have drawn attention to a wide range of ritual cultures and transcultural exchanges at an everyday, quotidian level. He has curated several exhibitions, most notably The Body in Indian Art and Thought, and published books, including The Making of the Modern Indian Artist Craftsman: Devi Prasad.

== Early life ==
Ahuja received his Ph.D. in Art and Archaeology from the School of Oriental and African Studies (SOAS) in London in 2001. His thesis was titled ‘Early Indian Moulded Terracotta: The Emergence of an Iconography and Variations in Style, Second Century BC to First Century AD’. A specific research contribution was his work on votive figurines and other imagery from the post-Mauryan period which brought to light a pantheon of Indian gods and goddesses that were irrevocably transformed after AD 200.

== Career ==
=== As professor ===
Ahuja teaches at Jawaharlal Nehru Univerity in Delhi. He has held visiting professorships and fellowships at the University of Zurich, the Ashmolean Museum at the University of Oxford, the Kunsthistorisches Institut in Florence, the University of Alberta in Edmonton and Nehru Memorial Museum and Library, New Delhi. Professor Ahuja has been tutor of the SOAS/Christie’s Asian Arts Course, the SOAS M.A. course in Religious, Fine and Decorative Arts of South Asia, and the British Museum’s Diploma in Asian Art. His research and graduate teaching covers a subjects including periods of artistic/visual exchange in pre-modern societies like ancient Gandhara, ancient temple statuary and iconography and the manuscripts painted in the Sultanate period in India.

=== Curator ===
As fellow of the Ashmolean Museum, Oxford, he authored a comprehensive catalogue of their collections of ancient Indian statuary and archaeological material. He has also held a curatorial position at the British Museum apart from curating several independent exhibitions in India and abroad on themes ranging from ancient to contemporary art. His research has led to several publications on ancient Indian art and religion, including ‘Changing Gods, Enduring Rituals: Observations on Early Indian Religion as seen through Terracotta Imagery c. 200 BC- AD 200.’ His book, The Making of the Modern Indian Artist-Craftsman: Devi Prasad (Routledge, 2011) provided a case-study of the impact of the Arts and Crafts Movement on India. Most recently, he curated the exhibition ‘The Body in Indian Art and Thought’ which was held at Palais des Beaux Arts in Brussels and National Museum, New Delhi The catalogue for the exhibition became The Body in Indian Art and Thought (Ludion, Antwerp, 2013, also in French and Dutch), exploring a variety of fundamental approaches to the aesthetics of anthropomorphic representation in India and the larger ideas that drive people to make images. William Dalrymple, in an article on the exhibition in The Guardian, claimed that ‘it is unlikely that a show like this will be put on again in our lifetime.’ He is also the curator of Lumbini Museum.

=== As editor ===
Ahuja is editor of Marg, an Indian quarterly journal on the arts.

=== Views ===
On 18 March 2012 at the convention "Collecting Ancient Art in the 21st Century", Naman said that in many countries modern development proved as serious a threat to archaeological sites as looting. It was imperative for collectors to engage with the views of archaeologists and challenging collector groups to find ways to help source countries stop looting. He is also vocal about the role of public officials in national cultural institutions. Such an idea of personal and public roles has also seen him strongly advocate a revision in the Antiquities law.

=== Publications ===
- The Making of the Modern Indian Artist Craftsman: Devi Prasad. Delhi: Routledge, 2011.
- Changing Gods, Enduring Rituals: Observations on Early Indian Religion as seen through Terracotta Imagery c. 200 BC - 200 AD in "South Asian Archaeology", Paris, 2001.
- Divine Presence, The Arts of India and the Himalayas. Milan: Five Continents Editions, 2003 in English, Catalan and Spanish.
- InFlux ed. with Parul Dave Mukherji and Kavita Singh. New Delhi: Sage, 2012.
- The Body in Indian Art and Thought. Belgium: Ludion, 2013 in English, French and Dutch.
- Exhibition Catalogue: Rupa-Pratirupa: The Body in Indian Art. New Delhi: National Museum, 2014.
- Art and Archaeology of Ancient India: Earliest Times to the Sixth Century. Oxford: the Ashmolean Museum, 2018.
