= Kamal Ahuja =

English physiologist

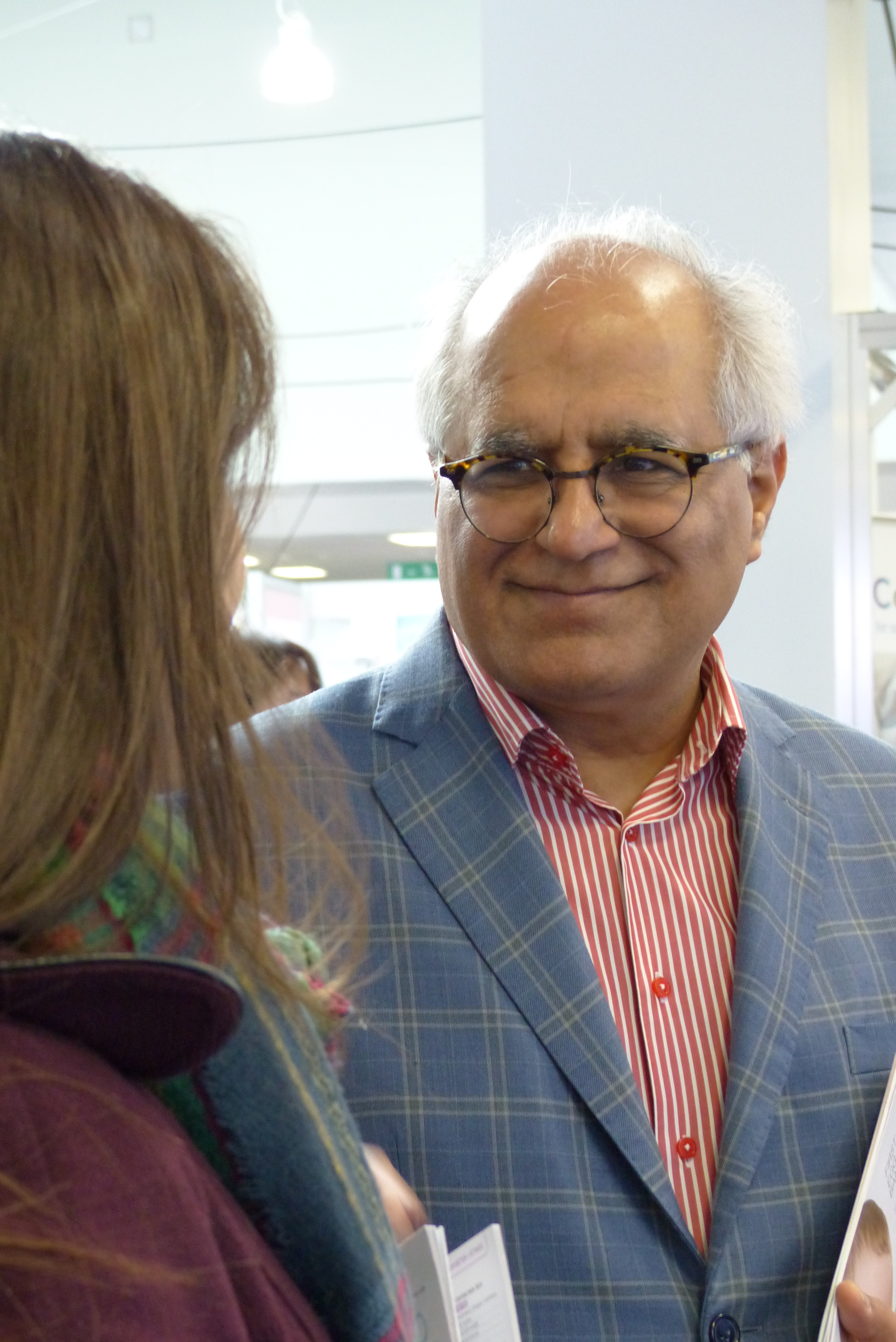
Dr Kamal Kishore Ahuja at the London Fertility show in November 2016

Kamal Kishore Ahuja is a physiologist and the managing and scientific director of JD Healthcare, the holding company for The London Women's Clinic, The London Ultrasound Centre, The London Sperm Bank, The London Egg Bank and the Bridge Centre. He was a pioneer of egg sharing in the UK in the 1990s and released an app to help women search for donor sperm in 2016.

== Education and early career ==
Ahuja was born in India in 1954, studied at the Banaras Hindu University before moving to the UK in 1977 to study at Cambridge under physiologist Robert Edwards. He received his PhD from the University of Cambridge in 1984 and went on to become the Head of Embryology at the Cromwell Hospital before becoming the scientific Manager Director of the Cromwell IVF program in 1986. In 2006 he became a Director of the London Women's Clinic based at Harley Street London.

Ahuja is also one of the founding editors of Reproductive Biomedicine Online.

== Personal life ==
Ahuja is married to chief Executive of Sadlers Wells, Anna Joan Gustafson and has three sons.
