= Nirmal Singh Maharaj =

Indian spiritual leader (1952–2007)

- Born: 7 July 1952; Dugri, Punjab, India
- Died: 31 May 2007 (aged 52); Delhi, India
- Occupations: Spiritual leader and Guru

Nirmal Singh (1952–2007), popularly called Guruji by his followers, was an Indian spiritual leader. He is also known as "Nirmal Singhji Maharaj", "Guru-ji Chattarpur Wale", "Dugri Wale Guruji", and "Shukrana Guruji".

Born in Punjab, he became famous as a spiritual leader across Punjab and Delhi, gaining several celebrities as his followers. His devotees attribute several miracles, including faith healing, to him, and consider him an incarnation of the god Shiva.

== Early life and education ==
Nirmal Singh was born on 7 July 1952 in the Dugri village of Punjab. He spent a lot of time at the dera of Sant Sewa Das at Dugri. According to his followers, he displayed miraculous powers during his childhood, such as the ability to fill inkpots of fellow students by just touching them with his fingers, and the ability to escape from a locked room when his parents attempted to prevent him from visiting the dera.

He left his home in 1975 to pursue a spiritual life: he would stay at the home of one of his acquaintances for some days, disappear for several days, and then move to the home of another acquaintance. He moved to Malerkotla for higher education, and obtained Master of Arts degrees in English and Economics to please his father. In 1983, he joined the Punjab School Education Board as a clerical assistant.

== As a spiritual leader ==
As a spiritual leader, Nirmal Singh emphasized the unity of all religions, focusing on love, compassion and service to mankind. He advised his followers to strike a balance between materialism and spiritualism. Gradually, the news of his alleged miraculous powers (including faith healing) spread across Punjab, and people would come to him to seek solutions to their problems. His father initially thought of him as a fake godman, but later changed his opinion. His parents came to believe that he was the God, and his mother started calling him Guru-ji.

He stayed at various places including Chandigarh, Panchkula, Delhi, Mumbai, and Jalandhar. In the 1990s, he commissioned the Shiv Mandir (a Shiva temple) in the Bhatti Mines area of Chattarpur in Delhi. The structure later came to be known as Bada Mandir ("Big Temple") among his followers. In 1997, he started living at a house in the Empire Estate colony on MG Road in New Delhi, owned by his Non-Resident Indian devotee Sudha Ahuja. His devotees now call the house Chotta Mandir ("Little Temple"). At times, he also lived at a house in the Defence Colony of Jalandhar, and frequently traveled between Delhi and Jalandhar. In 2002, he settled at the Empire Estate house, and lived there until his death in 2007.

Nirmal Singh held daily sangats (congregations) that featured meditations, satsang, recitations of gurbani and shabad (hymn), and langar. At these congregations, the clean-shaven and tonsured Singh would sit on a chair, wearing bright-colored silk clothes, while his followers sat on the floor. He spoke very less, generally communicating through gestures. He would chat with devotees, but did not give any sermons. The crowd at these gatherings comprised mostly Punjabis, including common people as well as well-known politicians, administrators, and socialites. His devotees claim that food served at his langar and the tea served as prasad during his sangats miraculously cured people of diseases. Rarely, he would attend other functions, including high-profile weddings.

== Death and aftermath ==
Nirmal Singh died on 31 May 2007: his followers regard the event as a mahasamadhi. The Shiv Temple (Bada Mandir) in Delhi became the site of his samadhi shrine. His devotees, including several celebrities, continued to organize the satsangs.

His followers include several celebrities including poet Manjit Tiwana, writer Ganga Prasad Vimal, photographer Raghu Rai, actor Ananya Panday and her father Chunky Pandey, actor Hema Malini, and members of the Kapoor family. Visitors to the Empire Estate house have included L. K. Advani, Arun Shourie, Uma Bharati, Rajnath Singh, Maneka Gandhi, S.K. Birla, Kiran Bedi, Rama Pilot, and Kiran Choudhry. Actor Rishi Kapoor held a satsang by Singh at his home. Actor Jacqueline Fernandez visited his Shiva temple in Delhi.

After Nirmal Singh's death, his nephew Navdeep Singh alias Gaurav took over the management of his ashram in the Chhatarpur area of Delhi. In 2020, a woman accused Gaurav (Navdeep Singh) of drugging and raping her in 2019 at a farmhouse near the ashram: she alleged that Gaurav told her that she was destined to give birth to a male child who would take forward the legacy of "Guruji". Gaurav denied the allegations, accusing the woman and her family of trying to extort money from him.

In 2023, the Empire Estate Residents Welfare Association (RWA) banned Nirmal Singh's devotees from visiting his former residence (Chotta Mandir), citing disruption and security risk to the local residents. The owner of the residence, a 70-year-old woman devotee, challenged the ban in court. Subsequently, the Delhi High Court permitted 500 identified devotees to visit the site in a staggered manner on Singh's birthday, and limited the number of daily visitors to the site to 100.
