= V. K. Ahuja =

Indian law professor (born 1967)

Prof. (Dr.) V. K. Ahuja
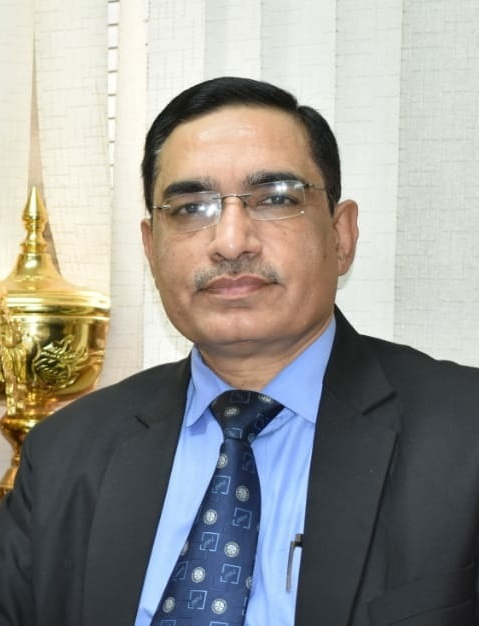
- Born: 6 March 1967 (age 59); India
- Education: University of Delhi (LL.M) Jawaharlal Nehru University (M.Phil.) University of Delhi (PhD)
- Occupation: Senior Professor
- Organization(s): Director, Indian Law Institute (Deemed to be University), New Delhi, India; February 2024 till date Vice-Chancellor, National Law University and Judicial Academy, Assam, India; 2021 - 2024; Joint Director, Delhi School of Public Policy and Governance, University of Delhi; 2020 - 2021; Professor In-Charge, Law Centre-II, Faculty of Law, University of Delhi; 2017 - 2020; Education Officer, Directorate of Research, Institute of Company Secretaries of India, New Delhi; 1997 - 1998
- Awards: First Prize in the Fifth South Asian Teaching Session on International Humanitarian Law and Refugee Law (2003)

V. K. Ahuja is a Senior Professor at the Faculty of Law, University of Delhi, India He is presently serving as Director of Indian Law Institute (Deemed to be University), New Delhi, India, he has also served as Vice-Chancellor of National Law University and Judicial Academy, Assam (NLUJAA), India. He has been a legal academic in the field of Intellectual Property Rights and International Law.

== Education ==
Prof. Ahuja obtained his Master's degree in Law from Faculty of Law, University of Delhi, Master of Philosophy (M. Phil) from Jawaharlal Nehru University, Delhi and Ph.D. from the University of Delhi.

== Early life ==
He began his career in the field of law as a research associate at the Faculty of Law in 1994, and subsequently worked as a lecturer at Law Centre - II from 1995 to 1997, and then from 1998 to 2000. In 1997-98, he briefly served as an education officer at the Institute of Company Secretaries of India (ICSI). He continued his teaching career at Law Centre - II as a senior lecturer from 2000 to 2004, and then as a reader from 2004 to 2007. In 2005-06, he also served as the principal of Lovely Institute of Law. Ahuja's contributions to legal education and research have been widely recognized, and he was appointed as an associate professor at Law Centre - II in 2007. He was promoted to the post of professor at the Faculty of Law, University of Delhi, in 2010.

== Academic career ==
Ahuja started his career in 1994 as a research associate at Faculty of Law, University of Delhi, and became a lecturer in 1995. In the year 2004, he was elevated to the post of reader. Later he became associate professor in 2007 and professor in 2010 at University of Delhi. He also served as the Principal of Lovely Institute of Law, Punjab (affiliated to Guru Nanak Dev University, Amritsar). He was the Professor In-charge of Law Centre-II, Faculty of Law, University of Delhi during 2017-2020. Furthermore, he was also appointed as Joint Director of Delhi School of Public Policy and Governance established under the Institute of Eminence (IOE), University of Delhi in 2020. In June 2021, Ahuja was appointed as Vice-Chancellor of National Law University and Judicial Academy, Assam, India.

== Memberships and boards ==
Ahuja served as a member of the governing body of Hindu College and Aryabhatta College of University of Delhi. He is also associated as a member of the Board of Management of Judicial Academy, Assam and a Member of the General Council of Damodaram Sanjivayya National Law University, Visakhapatnam. He served as a member of the Board of Studies/Academic Council/Executive Council of several Central and State Universities such as Rajiv Gandhi University, Arunachal Pradesh, Sikkim University, Rajiv Gandhi National University of Law, Patiala, Dr. B.R. Ambedkar National Law University, Sonipat, School of Law, VIT-AP University, B.B. Ambedkar University, Lucknow to name a few. He was the Regional Co-Ordinator for the entire North-East for the Common Law Admission Test (CLAT) in the year 2021 and a member of the Governing Body of the Consortium of NLUs. Prof. Ahuja is one of the Jury members of India Small and Medium Enterprises (SME) 100 Awards 2022.

== Awards ==
In 2003, he received the first prize as an exemplary teacher in the Fifth South Asian Teaching Session on International Humanitarian Law and Refugee Law organized jointly by the International Committee of the Red Cross (ICRC), United Nations High Commissioner for Refugees (UNHCR) and National Law School of India University, Bangalore.

== Selected publications ==
=== Books ===
- Law Relating to Intellectual Property Rights (1st edition 2007, 2nd edition 2013 and 3rd edition 2017)
- Law of Copyright and Neighboring Rights: National and International Perspectives (1st edition 2005, 2nd edition 2015)
- Public International Law (1st edition 2016, 2nd edition, 2021)
- Intellectual Property Rights in India (1st edition 2009, 2nd edition 2015)
- Halsbury Annotated Statutes of India (Vol.2 and Vol.5)
- Krishna and Mediation

=== Books edited/co-authored ===
- Human Rights: Contemporary Issues - A Festschrift in the Honour of Professor Upendra Baxi (2019)
- Legal Education in India in 21st Century: Problems and Prospects (1999)
- Law of Copyright: From Gutenberg's Invention to Internet (2001)
- The Law of Intellectual Property Rights: In Prospect and Retrospect (2001)
- Human Rights in 21st Century: Changing Dimensions (2012)
- Mediation (2020)
- Intellectual Property Rights: Contemporary Developments (2020)
- International Law: Contemporary Developments (2021)
- Mukul Asher on Economic Reasoning and Public Policy: Case Studies from India (2021)
- Handbook on the Geographical Indications (With Special Focus on North-East Region) (2022)
- Doctrine of Basic Structure: Revisiting Kesavananda Bharati Verdict on its 50th Anniversary (2023)
- Outcome based Education and Research: A Multidisciplinary Approach (2023)
- Tribal Law, Policy and Justice (2023)
- Legal Pedagogy and Research Methodology (2023)
- Research and Publication Ethics (2024)
- Enforcement of International Law in India: Constitutional and Legal Framework (2024)
