= Richa Ahuja =

Indian actress from 1992 to 2001

- Born: New Delhi
- Occupation: Actress
- Years active: 1992–2001
- Parent: Sushma Ahuja

Richa Ahuja is a former Indian actress. She has acted in Hindi, Tamil, English, and French films and plays.

== Career ==
Richa is the daughter of New Delhi-based vocalist and playwright, Sushma Ahuja, and a Sindhi Hindu father. Richa Ahuja acted in several plays right from her childhood through her acting career on screen. She made her first film appearance in Praying with Anger (1991), an experimental English film, which also marked the directorial debut of M. Night Shyamalan during his days as a student. She then moved on to perform in Hindi and English theatre as well as projects in Chennai, where she lived. She also trained under Ebrahim Alkazi, the founder of the National School of Drama New Delhi, when he formed the Living Theater Academy of Drama and featured in six of his productions. At the same time, she worked as a video jockey for Mirch Masala of Plus Channel, interviewing prominent actors such as Chiranjeevi and Nagarjuna. Subsequently, she began to receive offers to play roles in Hindi televisions serials and appeared in Parampara, Safar, Sathya and Shanti. She then got an offer for a Tamil serial, Suzhal and relocated to Chennai, after which she also featured in Oviyam and Panam Penn Pasam.

Richa had been looking to get a breakthrough in film roles, and an offer from Mani Ratnam also did not eventually materialize. She then appeared in her mother Sushma Ahuja's directorial venture, the 1998 romantic film Uyirodu Uyiraga, featuring Richa alongside Ajith Kumar. Richa took up the offer, after another popular actress had opted out of the role due to date issues. Singeetam Srinivasa Rao, with whom Sushma worked in the silent movie Pushpak, encouraged Richa to take up this project. The film was reportedly based on a real event which had occurred in the early 1990s. The film released to positive reviews from film critics. A reviewer praised the film as "a clean movie with no masala stuff" but criticized the "weak story-line", while also praising the performances in the film. During a holiday to France, she became involved in a French adaptation of Girish Karnad's play Hayavadana and subsequently learnt the language and appeared on stage for the play 45 times. She then relocated to France to feature in a film titled Le Mystère Parasuram (2000), which took almost two years in production. Despite the average success of her previous Tamil film, her next Tamil venture, Mani Ratnam's Dumm Dumm Dumm saw her feature alongside Madhavan and Jyothika in a secondary supporting role. She had earlier been in touch with the production studio, Madras Talkies, for a potential lead role.

== Filmography ==
Year	Film	Role	Language	Notes
1992	Praying with Anger	Rupal Mohan	English	
1997	Ziddi	Guddi	Hindi	
1998	Uyirodu Uyiraga	Anjali	Tamil	
2000	Le Mystère Parasuram	Indra Hamsa	French	
2001	Dumm Dumm Dumm	Asha	Tamil	

== See also ==
- List of Indian actresses
