= Nita Ahuja =

Surgeon

- Born: India
- Known for: CpG island methylator phenotype Epigenetic biomarkers for colorectal and pancreatic cancer
- Scientific career
- Fields: Surgical oncology, epigenetics
- Institutions: Johns Hopkins Hospital; Yale School of Medicine; Yale New Haven Hospital

Nita Ahuja is a surgeon and the Chair of the Department of Surgery at Yale School of Medicine and Surgeon-in-Chief of Surgery at Yale New Haven Hospital. She is the first woman ever to serve as Chair of Surgery in Yale. Before taking this position she was the first woman ever to be the Chief of Surgical Oncology at Johns Hopkins Hospital, Baltimore, USA. Ahuja researches in the field of epigenetics and is a passionate advocate of clinician scientist. She also served as the director of Sarcoma and peritoneal surface malignancy program. She is a surgeon-scientist and her research has been cited more than 11,000 times in scientific literature. In February 2025, Dr. Ahuja was announced as the next Dean of the University of Wisconsin School of Medicine and Public Health, a position she will assume on May 15, 2025.

== Early life and education ==
Born in India, she migrated to the United States with her parents when she was 8 years old. Her journey into the world of science started as a laboratory technician in Dept. of Immunology, National Institutes of Health (NIH), Bethesda. She was awarded with "Outstanding College Students of America" and "Alpha-omega-alpha original research award" for her outstanding research work. She joined the faculty of Johns Hopkins in 2003 after studying medicine at Duke University and surgery at Johns Hopkins.

== Career ==
Ahuja runs a research laboratory focused on understanding the epigenetic dysregulation in gastrointestinal cancers such as colorectal cancers and pancreas cancers and translating the information to develop biomarkers and epigenetic therapeutics. She has led over twenty national and international clinical trials on testing new therapies in gastrointestinal and breast cancers based on concepts identified in her laboratory. Her work initially as a postdoctoral research fellow twenty years ago identified the concept of CpG island methylator phenotype (CIMP) or CpG island hypermethylation in colorectal cancer. This concept of CIMP now is known to have implications for prognosis as well as response to therapy. CIMP has now been shown to exist in multiple other tumor types such as glioblastomas, leukemia, duodenal cancers etc.

Her laboratory has also identified biomarkers for early detection of colorectal and pancreas cancer using non-invasive body fluids such as serum or plasma. These biomarkers have been licensed and are currently being developed into a commercial assay.

Ahuja also led the epigenetic therapy trials in solid tumors as part of the Stand Up To Cancer consortium since 2008 and since then her laboratory has generated preclinical data for the next generation of clinical epigenetic trials conducted nationally and internationally. She has won several awards over the years including the Abell Foundation Award: Johns Hopkins Alliance for Science and Technology Development in 2014.

== Writing ==
She is co-author of a 2016 report for the Society of University Surgeons on barriers facing surgeon-scientists in basic science. She also co-authored Along with Soft Tissue Sarcomas, An Issue of Surgical Clinics (Volume 88-3) (The Clinics: Surgery (Volume 88-3)).

As well as Johns Hopkins guides for patients, including:

- Johns Hopkins Patients' Guide to Pancreatic Cancer
- Johns Hopkins Patient Guide to Colon and Rectal Cancer,
- Early Diagnosis and Treatment of Cancer Series: Colorectal Cancer: Expert Consult (Early Diagnosis in Cancer).
