= Manjit Rupowalia =

- Born: Manjit Singh
- Occupations: Singer, actor
- Years active: 1995–present
- Website: Official Facebook – www.facebook.com/manjitrupowaliaofficial

Manjit Singh, popularly known as Manjit Rupowalia (Punjabi: ਮਨਜੀਤ ਰੁਪੋਵਾਲਿਆ) is a Punjabi singer-songwriter and actor from India. He is a legend singer He has 3 brothers and 2 sisters

== Discography ==
Commercial Albums
Name	Year of Release	Language	Label
Gairaan Di Mehendi	1998	Punjabi	Anurag Shri Company
Teri Bewafai	1999	Punjabi	Anurag Shri Company
Dil Soch Ke Layien	2000	Punjabi	Anmol Music
Ek Tere to Bina	2002	Punjabi	Anmol Music
Sadke Terian Yadaan De	2003	Punjabi	Anmol Music
Lang Ja Morniye	2005	Punjabi	Lucky Star Music Company
Vadde	2005	Punjabi	SMI Audio
Baazi	2007	Punjabi	SMI Audio
100/100	2014	Punjabi	SMI Audio
Choice	2013	Punjabi	SMI Audio
Goonje Chamkila	2015	Punjabi	Amar Audio
Love Forever	2014	Punjabi	Vvhanjali Records
Beautiful Mukhre	2015	Punjabi	Anand Music Company

Name	Year of Release	Language	Label
Bajan Wale De Choj Naira	2010	Punjabi	Aanad Music Company
Darshan Jagdambey De	2008	Punjabi	Anmol Music Company
Siftaan Darbaar Diyan	2012	Punjabi	SMI
Mere Pritam Pyare	2001	Punjabi	Nirankari Geets
Maiya Ji De Rangan Vich	2014	Punjabi	SK Records
Maujan Hi Maujan	2012	Punjabi	Nirankari Geets
Swaali Tere Darr De	2005	Punjabi	Nirankari Geets

== Awards ==
- ‘Appreciation Award’ from ‘Member of Parliament, Brampton, Canada’ in July 2009
- ‘Punjab Cultural Promotion Event’ from Vancouver, B.C., Canada on 8 June 2008
- Participation award in ‘The Guinness Book of World Records’ in August 2012, United Kingdom.
- Award of Honour from ‘Shri Guru Ravi Dass Community Center’, Burnaby, B.C., Canada in June 2008
- Best performance Award in ‘Vaisakhi Mela 2008’ in New York City
- Maan Punjab Da Award’ in Italy in year 2010
