= Sachin Ahuja =

Indian music producer and music composer

- Born: 19 July 1978 (age 48); Delhi (India)
- Occupations: Music producer Music composer Reality Show judge
- Years active: 1996-present
- Label: Various
- Father: Charanjit Ahuja
- Awards: Punjabi Music Awards; Punjab Rattan Award; Mirchi Music Awards

Sachin Ahuja is an Indian music producer and music composer.

== Films ==
- Yaariyan
- Pooja Kiven AA
- Jora 10 Numbaria
