= Amar Singh Chamkila =

Indian singer (1960–1988)

Background information
- Also known as: Chamkila
- Born: Dhani Ram; 21 July 1960; Dugri, Ludhiana, Punjab, India
- Died: 8 March 1988 (aged 27) Mehsampur, Punjab, India
- Genres: Punjabi duets, solos, folk, religious
- Occupations: Singer, musician, composer
- Instruments: Vocals, tumbi, harmonium, dholak
- Years active: 1979–1988
- Label: His Master's Voice
- Spouse(s): Gurmail Kaur, Amarjot

Amar Singh Chamkila (21 July 1960 – 8 March 1988) was an Indian singer and musician of Punjabi music. Chamkila's vivid language, high-pitched vocals, and novel compositions accompanied by tumbi made him popular. His music was influenced by the Punjabi village life in which he grew up.

Chamkila was an influential Punjabi artist and live stage performer, often called the "Elvis of Punjab". His first recorded song was "Takue Te Takua", and his hits include "Pehle Lalkare Naal" and the devotional songs "Baba Tera Nankana", "Tar Gayi Ravidas Di Pathri", and "Talwar Main Kalgidhar Di". Though he never recorded it himself, he wrote the song "Jatt Di Dushmani", which has been performed by many other Punjabi artists.

On 8 March 1988, at the height of his popularity during the insurgency in Punjab, India, Chamkila and his second wife Amarjot were killed along with two members of their band in an assassination which remains unsolved.

== Early life ==
Amar Singh Chamkila was born as Dhani Ram on 21 July 1960 into a Dalit Sikh family in the village of Dugri near Ludhiana, Punjab, India. His aspirations of becoming an electrician were unfulfilled and he eventually found work at a Ludhiana cloth mill.

== Career in music ==
With a natural aptitude for music, Chamkila learned to play the harmonium and dholki. In 1979, Chamkila approached Surinder Shinda for the first time on a bicycle with his best friend Kuldeep Paras. When Shinda heard the 18-year-old Chamkila sing, he finally found the protégé he had been looking for. Chamkila would go on to play alongside Punjabi folk artists such as K. Deep, Mohammad Sadiq, and Shinda. Chamkila wrote several songs for Shinda and accompanied him as a member of his entourage before deciding to pursue a solo career.

Adopting the stage name Amar Singh Chamkila – Chamkila in Punjabi means "one that glitters" – Chamkila first partnered up with the female vocalist Surinder Sonia, who had previously worked with Surinder Shinda. Sonia had felt sidelined after Shinda took Gulshan Komal to a tour in Canada, after which she was instrumental in pushing Chamkila to record his debut album. The pair recorded eight duets and released the album Takue Te Takua in 1980 with music produced by Charanjit Ahuja. The cunningly worded lyrics, which he had written himself, became hits across Punjab.

In 1980, Chamkila felt he was being significantly underpaid by Surinder Sonia's manager (her husband) and decided to form his own group. Chamkila established short-lived stage partnerships with Miss Usha Kiran, Amar Noorie, and others.

For the most part, he continued to write his own lyrics, the majority of which were boyish and suggestive yet fluent commentaries on extramarital affairs, alcohol, and drug use. The couple's appeal grew not only in the Punjab but also among international Punjabis abroad. Around this time, Chamkila was rumoured to be receiving more bookings than his contemporaries. The biography Awaz Mardi Nahin by Gulzar Singh Shaunki found during its research that at the height of his popularity Chamkila had performed 366 shows in 365 days.

== Assassination ==
On 8 March 1988 at approximately 2 PM, having arrived to perform in Mehsampur, Punjab, both Chamkila and his wife Amarjot were gunned down as they exited their vehicle. A gang of motorcyclists fired several rounds, fatally wounding the couple and other members of the entourage. However, no arrests were ever made in connection with the shooting, and the case was never solved. It has been alleged that Sikh militants were responsible. This theory was refuted by Chamkila's close friend and lyricist Swarn Sivia, who investigated the murder independently. Sivia revealed that three Khalistani militant organisations targeted Chamkila due to his controversial songs. Acting as a mediator, Sivia facilitated a meeting between Chamkila and a delegation of five Khalistani leaders at Darbar Sahib Amritsar where Chamkila apologised and vowed to change the themes of his songs. Following that, Chamkila performed some timeless songs on Sikh history, including "Sathon Baba Kho Laya Tera Nankana". Sivia remained skeptical that Khalistan militants were responsible for his murder, saying, "Throughout my life, I have continued to investigate who was behind his killing."

== Legacy ==
=== Influence ===
Indian film composer Amit Trivedi called Chamkila "a legend, the Elvis of Punjab."

British Indian musician Panjabi MC cites Chamkila as one of his musical influences.

=== In popular culture ===
Mehsampur is a 2018 Indian mockumentary film based on Chamkila's life, produced and directed by Kabir Singh Chowdhry.

Jodi, a 2023 Indian Punjabi-language film, was inspired by the life of Chamkila.

Amar Singh Chamkila, a biographical drama film based on Chamkila's life, was released on Netflix on 12 April 2024. It is directed by Imtiaz Ali and stars Diljit Dosanjh as Chamkila and Parineeti Chopra as his wife, Amarjot Kaur.

== Discography ==
Chamkila's studio recordings were released by His Master's Voice as LP records and EP records during his lifetime. Though several compilation albums have been released since his death, the following CDs compiled by Saregama comprise nearly all of Chamkila's studio recordings:

- Amar Singh Chamkila Surinder Sonia (EP) (1981)
- Surinder Sonia & Amar Singh Chamkila (EP) (1982)
- Mitra Main Khand Ban Gai (EP) (1983)
- Chaklo Driver Purje Nun (EP)
- Jija Lak Minle (LP) (1983)
- Hikk Utte So Ja Ve (LP) (1985)
- Bhul Gai Main Ghund Kadna (LP) (1985)
- Rat Nun Sulah-Safaiyan (EP) (1985)
- Sharbat Vangoon Ghut Bhar Laa (LP) (1987)
- Baba Tera Nankana
- Tar Gayi Ravidas Di Pathri
- Naam Jap Le (1986)
- Talwar Main Kalgidhar Di Haan (1985)
- Yaad Aave War War (LP) (1988) (released after his death)

=== Posthumous albums ===
- The Diamond (2014)

== See also ==
- List of unsolved murders (1980–1999)
- 27 Club
