= Philippe Jaenada =

French writer

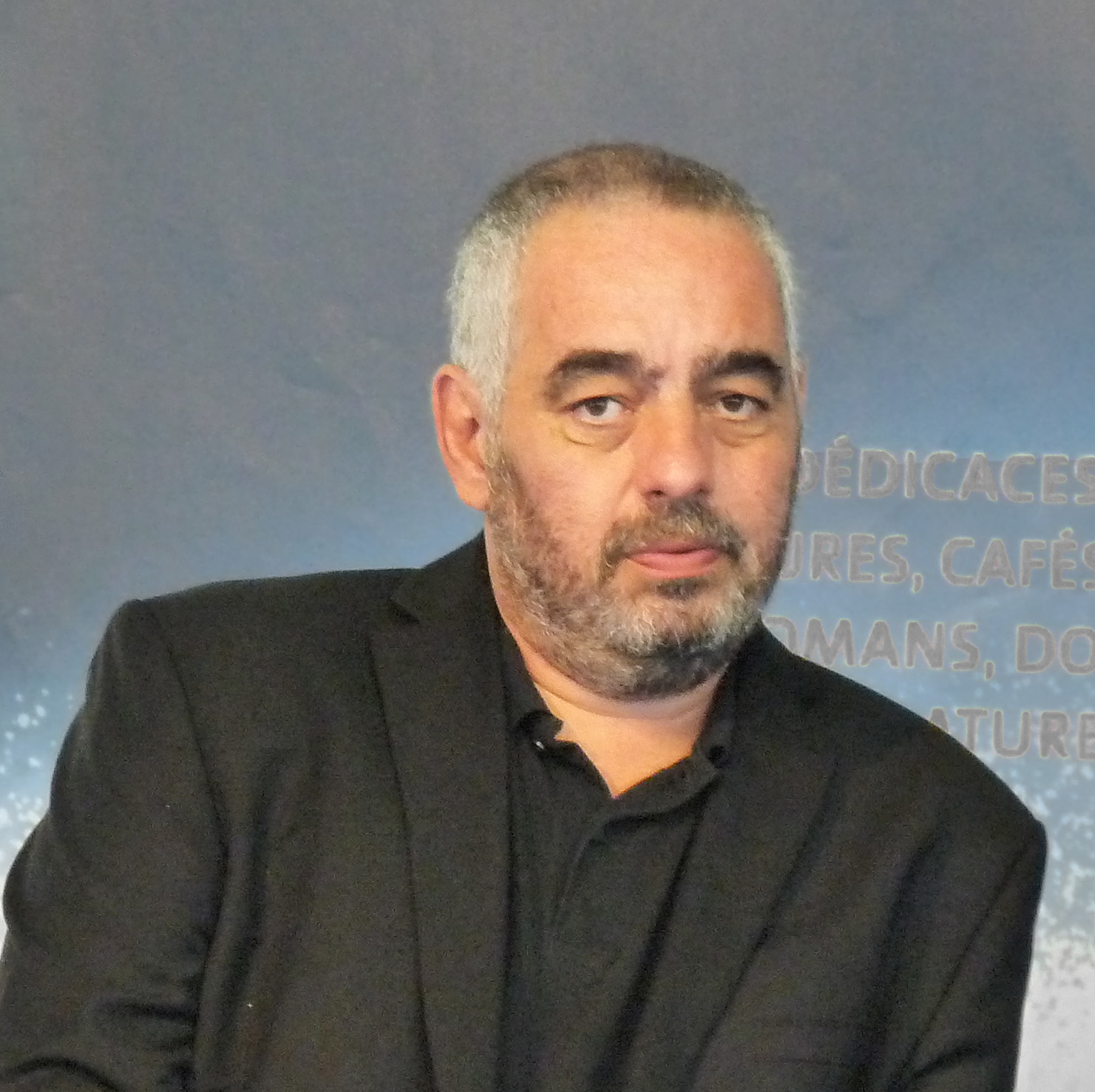
Philippe Jaenada in 2012

Philippe Jaenada (French pronunciation: [filip ʒenada]; born 1964 in Saint-Germain-en-Laye) is a French writer. The author of over a dozen books, he won the Prix Femina for his 2017 novel La Serpe, and the Prix Goncourt in 2026 for his novel L'Inconnue du quai Javel.
