= Jugni =

Music genre

Jugni is an age-old narrative device used in Punjabi folk music. It is the traditional music of the Punjab region of the Indian subcontinent.

Jugni is sung at Punjabi weddings in India, Pakistan, and elsewhere where Punjabi immigrants have settled including the US, Canada, Australia and the UK. In folk music, it stands in for the poet-writer who uses Jugni as an innocent observer to make incisive, often humorous, sometimes sad but always touching observations.

== Description ==
In spiritual poetry, Jugni means the spirit of life, or essence of life. Jugni is a style of singing that was first created by a famous Punjabi folk singer (late) Alam Lohar, who belonged to Achh, a small village of Gujrat in Punjab of British India, prior to the creation of Pakistan, Alam Lohar and after this singer, other singers have adopted this style. Alam Lohar is also credited with popularizing this poetry from early Sufi spiritual writings and then subsequently later on it was transformed by other singers as a female girl just like prefixes like Preeto.

Alam Lohar started this genre of singing 'Jugni' during his early performances around pre-partition (1947), he sang Jugni throughout his early years of singing which was in the 1930s when he was a child star (started singing at a very young age) and many of his songs were not recorded at that time due to limited recording facilities within British India (pre-partition). His LP record titled 'Jugni' was recorded later on in his career and became a gold disc LP in 1965.

Alam Lohar has also recorded multiple variations of Jugni and some of this is still available to hear on many LP records and visible on black and white TV recordings even available on YouTube to view. Other singers throughout the world have been greatly influenced by the Jugni recordings that Alam Lohar performed including his son Arif Lohar.

Much of early Jugni writing is spiritual in nature and relates to one's understanding of the world and one's relationship with God. Many poet philosophers have used the Jugni device, which is in the public domain, to make social, political or philosophical, often mildly subversive, commentary. Jugni invokes the name of God (often using the word "Saeen", the vernacular word for Lord). A kernel of truth is an essential and integral part of every Jugni composition and there is a theory that Alam Lohar introduced and was influenced in relaying this term from reading old Sufi writings.

Noting, Jugni is also an old Muslim worship tool, majorly named as TASBIH, a series of 21, 33, 51 or 101 pearls, which is used by SUFI SAINTS for practicing the holy words. Mainly it is made by white pearls and white thread and is known to be holy. Afterward, JUGNI has become an ornament for Punjabi Women.

The narrative style relies on Jugni landing up unexpectedly in diverse places and, wide-eyed, learning something new. Jugni makes her comments in three or four well written verses which may or may not rhyme but can always be sung in a rudimentary Punjabi folk style. The object could be a city, a state, a marketplace, a school, a religious place or a saloon, Jugni's non-malicious commentary catches the essence of the place and produces in the listener a chuckle and sometimes a lump in the throat. The Indian artist to make a mark was Asa Singh Mastana. Also, Kuldeep Manak, born Latif Mohammad, has made notable Jugni contributions. Apart from that every other pop or folk singer from Harbhajan Mann, Arif Lohar, Gurdas Maan, Gurmeet Bawa to Rabbi Shergill has had his Jugni moment. Bollywood movie Oye Lucky, Lucky Oye has at least three songs that use the word Jugni. The song was sung by Des Raj Lachkani (basically a dadi singer), Lachkani is a village near Patiala, India.

In Pakistan, Jugni was popularized by the late folk music singer Alam Lohar. He received a gold disc LP for his Jugni in 1965. After that Saleem Javed and Arif Lohar, Alam Lohar's son, among others, have kept the tradition alive. Arif has brought in a more contemporary touch by incorporating modern vibes and rock influence in his versions of Jugni with Mukhtar Sahota (notably in his album "21st century Jugni"). In popular Pakistani culture Alamgir's Jugni is often the most-commonly recognized, which, in the mid-80's, encouraged young college students, most notably Saad Zahur, an architecture student at Lahore's NCA, who popularized the song with their own renditions. Arif Lohar has currently sang it for Coke Studio in Pakistan along with Meesha Shafi, a popular Pakistani youth, a version that will help this iconic song to further live on and on. This version of Jugni has crossed 110 million views and is the most popular Punjabi video on YouTube.

== Examples ==
=== List of Jugni songs ===
There are many variations of this song sung by many folk artists.

- "Jugni" by Malkit Singh (Star Crazy by Bally Sagoo, 1991)
- "Jugni" by Nouman Khalid featuring Bilal Saeed
- "Jugni Mast Kalandar" by Baba Sehgal
- Rabbi (2004) - Rabbi Shergill
- "Ramta Di Jugni" - Hazara Singh Ramta
- "Jugni" by Des Raj Lachkani (Oye Lucky Lucky Oye!, 2008)
- "Jugni" by Daler Mehndi (2008)
- "Sadi Gali" by Lehmber Hussainpuri and "Jugni" by Mika Singh (Tanu Weds Manu, 2011)
- "Jugni" by Babbu Maan (Saheb Biwi Aur Gangster, 2011)
- "Alif Allah (Jugni)" by Arif Lohar and Meesha Shafi (Coke Studio Pakistan, season 3)
  - Also in Cocktail (2012), sung by Arif Lohar and Harshdeep Kaur
- "Jugni Ji Remix" by Dr Zeus and Kanika Kapoor
- "Jugni" by Jazzy B (Saheb, Biwi Aur Gangster Returns, 2013)
- "Jugni" (1989) by Alamgir
- "Jugni" (1993) by Saleem Javed
  - Also used in the song "Poster Lagwado Bazar Mein (Duet)" by Lalit Sen and Shweta Shetty in Aflatoon (1997)
- "Jugni" (1990) by Azaad Group UK
- "Jugni" by A. R. Rahman (Kaatru Veliyidai, 2017)
- "Jugni" by Tochi Raina (Sufi Acoustica, 2018)
- "Jugni 2.0" by Kanika Kapoor, featuring Mumzy Stranger and DJ Lyan Rose
- "Jugni" by Diljit Dosanjh & Diamond Platnumz
- "Jugni" by Vheer and 4Shaur (2025)

=== Jugni artists ===
Some of the more popular and notable names of this style include:

- Alam Lohar (1930s–1979) is credited with creating and popularising the term jugni.
- Arif Lohar
- Asa Singh Mastana
- Gurmeet Bawa
- Kuldeep Manak
- Surinder Kaur
- Surjeet Bindrakhia

== See also ==
- Folk music of Punjab
- Jugni (2011 Lollywood film)
- Vaar
