= Dolly Guleria =

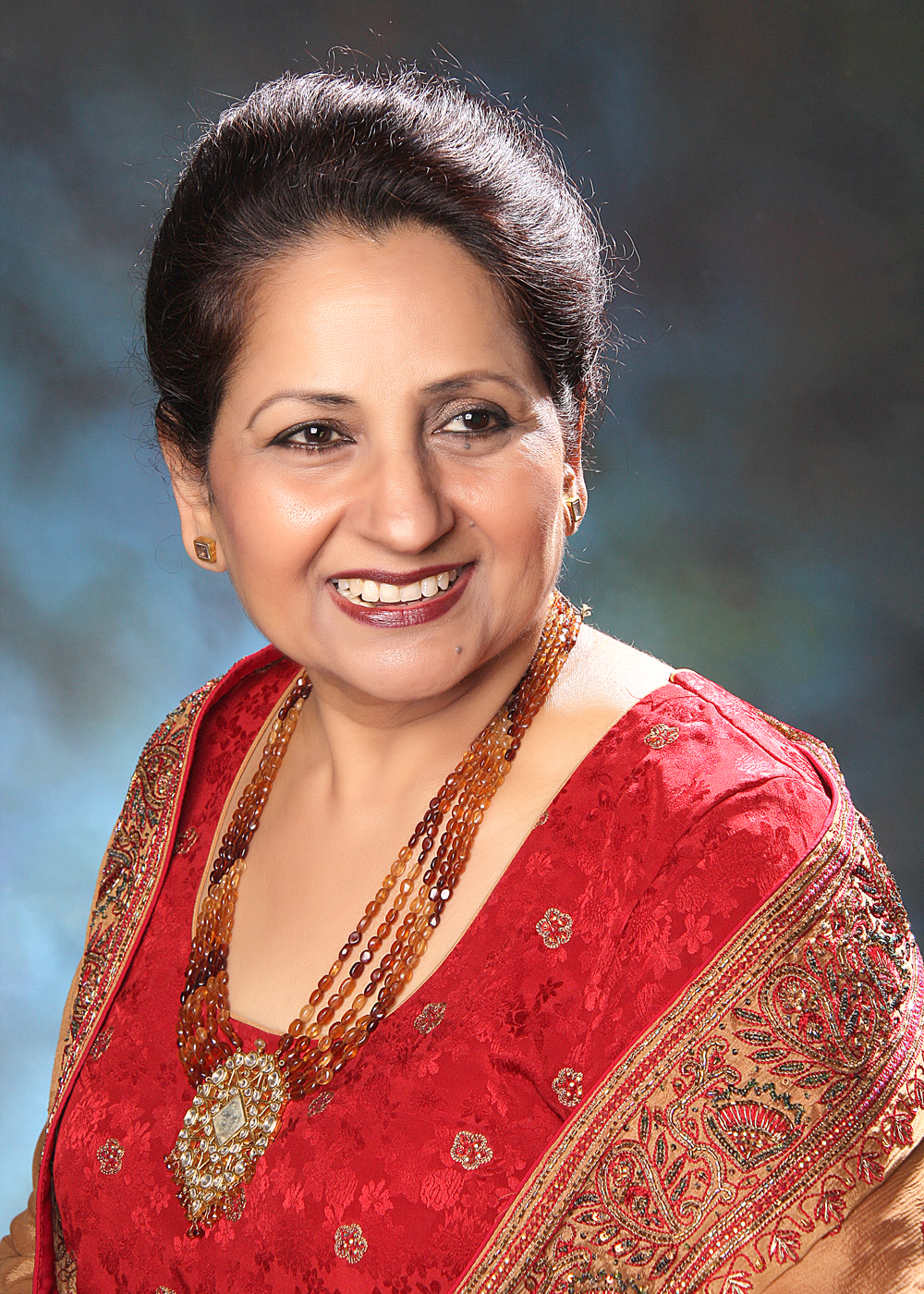

Background information
- Born: Rupinder Kaur Sodhi; 14 April 1949; Bombay, India
- Genres: Folk; Sufi; Ghazals; Gurbani; Film
- Occupations: Singer; songwriter; playback artist
- Years active: 1966-till date
- Label: DO RE ME Creations
- Website: dollyguleria.com

Dolly Guleria (born 14 April 1949) is an Indian vocalist, primarily a folk singer in Punjabi with expertise in Punjabi Folk, Shabad Gurbani, Sufi and Ghazal genres of Music. She is the daughter of Professor Jogindra Singh and the legendary folk singer Surinder Kaur, popularly known as 'The Nightingale of Punjab'.

== Career ==
During her medical studies, Guleria sought a career as a doctor. In 1970 she married Army Officer Col. S.S.Guleria and has a daughter, Sunaini Sharma, and two sons, Dilpreet Singh and Amanpreet Singh. After settling down with motherhood she was encouraged by her husband to continue her training in classical music on getting an opportunity to become the disciple of a very learned Ustad, 'Khan Sahib’ Abdul Rehman Khan, of 'Patiala Gharana' who trained her in the field of classical music.

Under the able guidance of her Ustad, she chose to release her solo debut album in Gurbani in Ragas and sang "Rehraas Sahib" the evening 'Paath' in its original ragas. Subsequently, albums were released of Punjabi folk songs, some with her mother and some solo including Shabad Kirtan, the poetry of Shiv Kumar Batalvi, Bhai Veer Singh and other renowned writers.

She has also contributed her voice as a playback singer in Punjabi films such as Rab Dian Rakhaan, Deson Pardes and Main Maa Punjab Di.

== Recognition ==
During her goodwill and cultural exchange visit to Pakistan in November 1997 she and her daughter Sunaini Sharma enthralled the audience of Pakistan at the Gaddafi Stadium, Lahore and in Faisalabad (Lyallpur) at the Chenab Club with her music. She was honoured with a golden plaque of Minar-e-Pakistan and a Gold Medal her outstanding contribution.

== Personal life ==
Guleria prioritizes live performances, citing the immediate rapport with audiences as a key influence on her work. She is dedicated to preserving traditional Punjabi music in its original form.

== See also ==
- Surinder Kaur
- Parkash Kaur
- Asa Singh Mastana
- List of Punjabi singers
