= Nand Lal Noorpuri =

Poet and film songs lyricist (1906-1966)

- Born: Nand Lal; June 1906; Noorpur, Punjab Province, British India
- Died: 13 May 1966 (aged 59–60); Jalandhar, Punjab, India
- Occupations: Poet, lyricist

Nand Lal Noorpuri (June 1906 – 13 May 1966) was an Indian poet, writer and lyricist who wrote in Punjabi.

He wrote lyrics for many films, including the 1942 romantic drama film Mangti. He died by suicide on 13 May 1966.

== Early life ==
Nand Lal Noorpuri was born in June 1906, to father Bishan Singh and mother Hukman Devi, in the Noor Pur 122 JB Faisalabad village of Lyallpur district in British Punjab. He studied at Khalsa High School and at the old Khalsa College in Lyallpur (renamed as Faisalabad in Pakistan after partition in 1947). He quit college and joined first as a teacher and then as an assistant sub-inspector in Bikaner in Rajasthan where he received a bravery award.

He married Sumittra Devi and the couple had four daughters and two sons. After partition in 1947, he settled in Jalandhar, India.

== Career ==
In 1940, he left police force and came back to Punjab and wrote lyrics for Punjabi film Mangti 1942 . that made him known to everyone in Punjab. But the partition in 1947 changed everything for him. The source of income dried up. He lost his home and livelihood and came to Jalandhar. Later, he found work in radio and started participating in kavi darbars (English: poetic concerts). But this was in dribs and drabs and did not earn him enough for his family's living expenses. His songs were sung by many notable singers of Punjab including Mohammad Rafi, Surinder Kaur, Narinder Biba, Asa Singh Mastana, Parkash Kaur.

== Selected popular songs ==
Song title	Lyrics by
Chann Wey Ke Shaunkan Melay Di	Nand Lal Noorpuri
Gori Diyan Jhanjharan Bulaandian Gayyan, Gallian De Wich Dandh Paundian Gayyan	Nand Lal Noorpuri
Meinun Deorr De Wiah Vich Nachh Lein De	Nand Lal Noorpuri
Balle Ni Punjab Diye Sher Bachiey	Nand Lal Noorpuri
Aithon Udjaa Bhole Panchhia, Tu Apni Jaan Bacha	Nand Lal Noorpuri

== Death ==
Disillusioned with his own poverty and lack of support and recognition from the government, he committed suicide on 13 May 1966, by jumping into the well near his house in Model House Block-A colony, Jalandhar, India. This well was filled up later and a sapling planted over it, as a memorial to him.

== Nand Lal Noorpuri Society ==
Some years back, some poets and journalists formed the Nand Lal Noorpuri Society with the aim of spreading the poet's work. It gives an annual award to singers and poets. Sarbjit Cheema was a recipient of the award for his song on girl foeticide.

== See also ==
- Shiv Kumar Batalvi
- Bari Nizami
