= Jaswinder Brar =

Indian folk singer

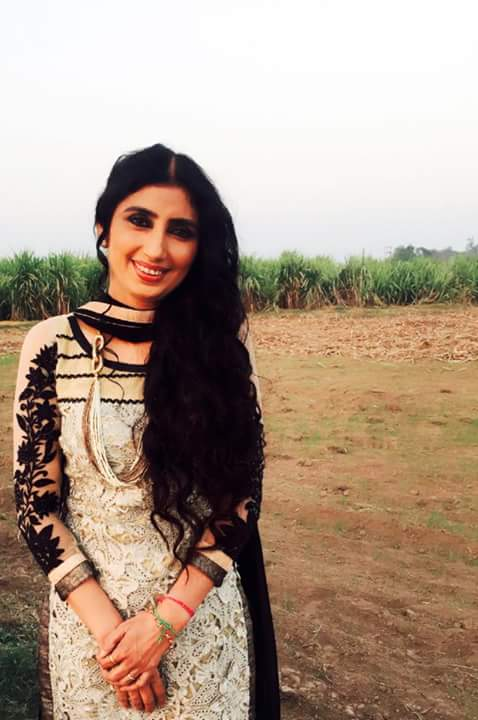

Background information
- Born: Jaswinder Kaur Brar; Kalanwali Mandi District Sirsa (Haryana)
- Genres: Bhangra, folk, pop, religious
- Occupation: Singer
- Years active: 1990–present

Jaswinder Brar is an Indian folk singer who sings in Punjabi language. She sings Punjabi folk and Bhangra and known as the Folk Queen. She is known for her stage shows and is called Akharheya Di Rani. She is specially known for her Lok Tatths. She started her career with the album named "Keemti Cheez" in 1990.

== Personal life ==
She got married on 2000 to Ranjit Singh Sidhu and took a break for about two years from singing while she had given birth to a daughter named Jashanpreet Kaur

== Awards and honors ==
Among her awards, she is honoured with the "Shromani Punjabi Lok Gaaiki Award 2010" in November; she is the 12th to receive that award. She received others including Sangeet Samrat award on Prof. Mohan Singh Mela. She was nominated for the PTC Channel Punjabi's music awards 2006, for "Best Folk Oriented Vocalist (Female)" (for her song "Mirza") and "Best Oriented Folk Album (Female)" (for her album Gallan Pyar Dian) and awarded as best folk vocalist female 2006.

== Discography ==
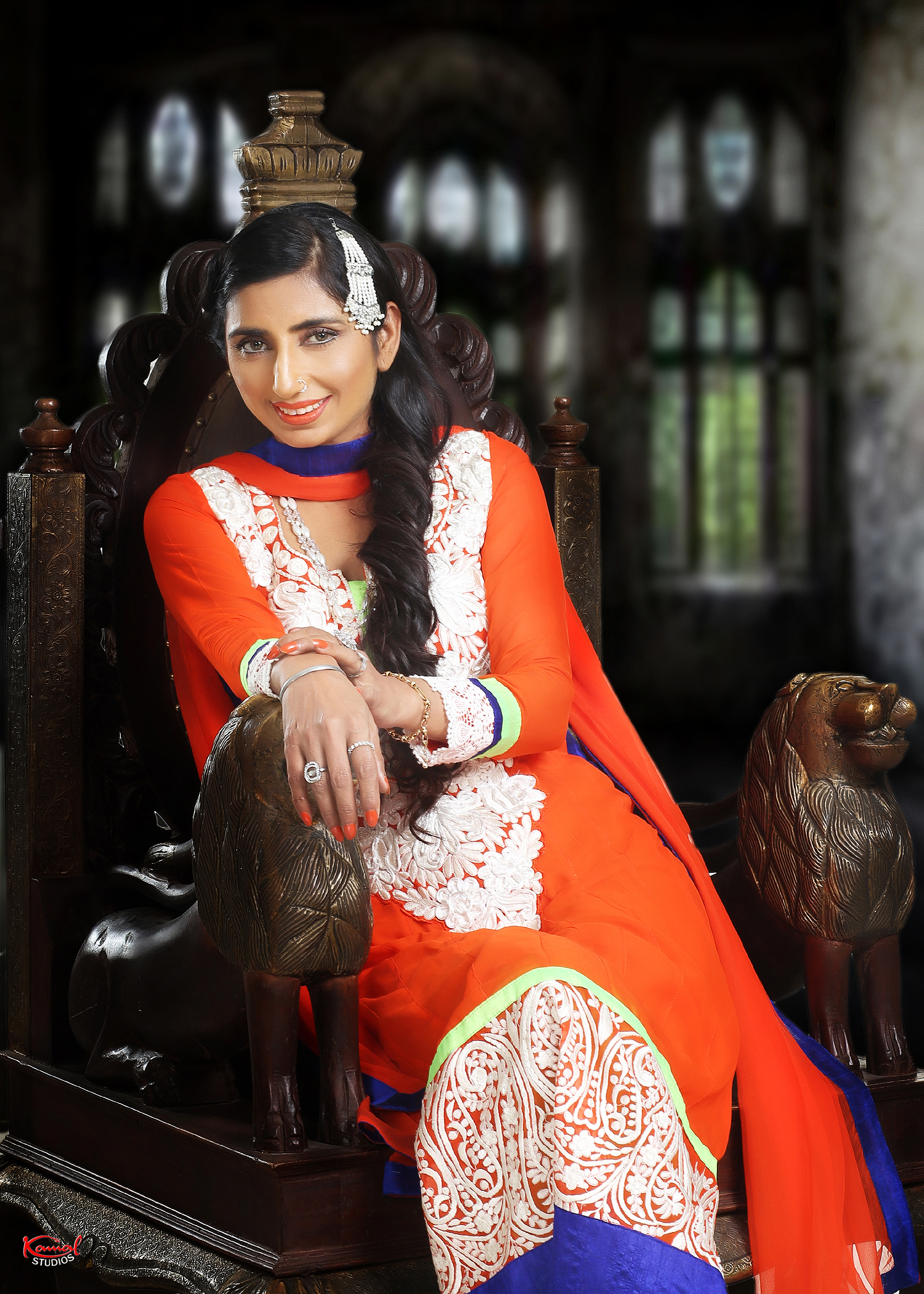
Jaswinder Brar posing for her album Jiunde Rehn

She started her career with the album named Keemti Cheez in 1990 and released several albums since then.

- Keemti Cheez
- Khulla Akharha
- Ranjha Jogi Ho Gia
- Akhara
- Ishq Mohabbat Yaari
- Dooja Akhara
- Itt Khrakka
- Goonjda Akhara
- Bol Kalaihria Mora
- Jhalla Dil Waajan Maarda
- Rondi Nu Hor Rava Ke
- Teri Yaad Sataave
- Main Teri Jann Gherungi
- Main Tan Tainu Yaad Kardi
- Gallaan Pyar Dian
- Pyar – The Colors of Love (02 Nov. 2010)
- Jeonde Rehn (2014)
- Tin Gallan (2018)

== See also ==
- Narinder Biba
- Gurmeet Bawa
- Shazia Manzoor
- Surinder Kaur
- Anita Lerche
- List of Punjabi singers
