= Jugnu =

Jugnu (lit. 'firefly') may refer to:

- Bhagwant Mann, better known by his stage name Jugnu, the 17th Chief Minister of Punjab
- Jugnu (1973 film), an Indian Hindi-language action film
- Jugnu (1947 film), an Indian musical romantic comedy film
- Jugnu (satellite), an Indian technology demonstration and remote sensing satellite
- Sumann, also Jugnu Ishiqui, Indian actress

== See also ==
- Jugni, a type of Punjabi folk song
- Jugni (2011 film), an Indian Punjabi-language film
- Jugni (2016 film), an Indian Punjabi-language film
