= List of Pakistani folk singers =

This article contains notable folk singers that are based in Pakistan. Following are the most popular Pakistani folk singers of all times.

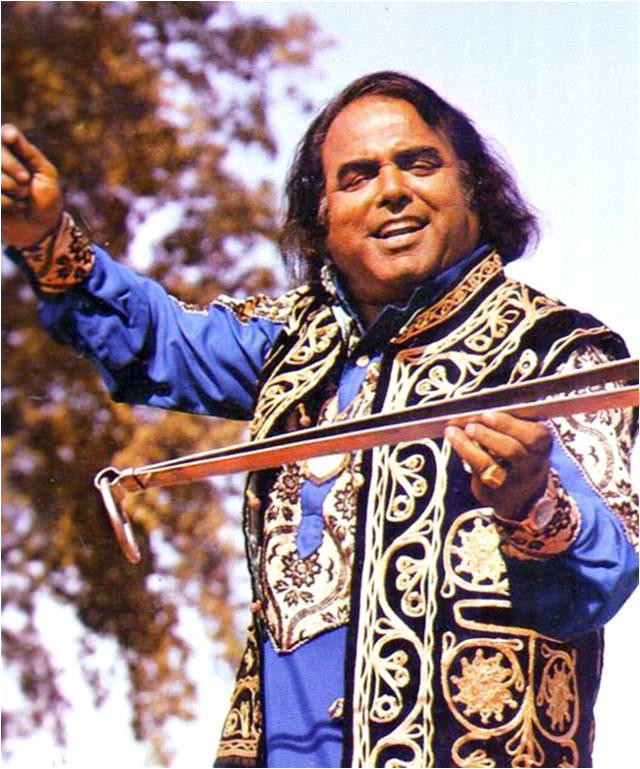
Alam Lohar

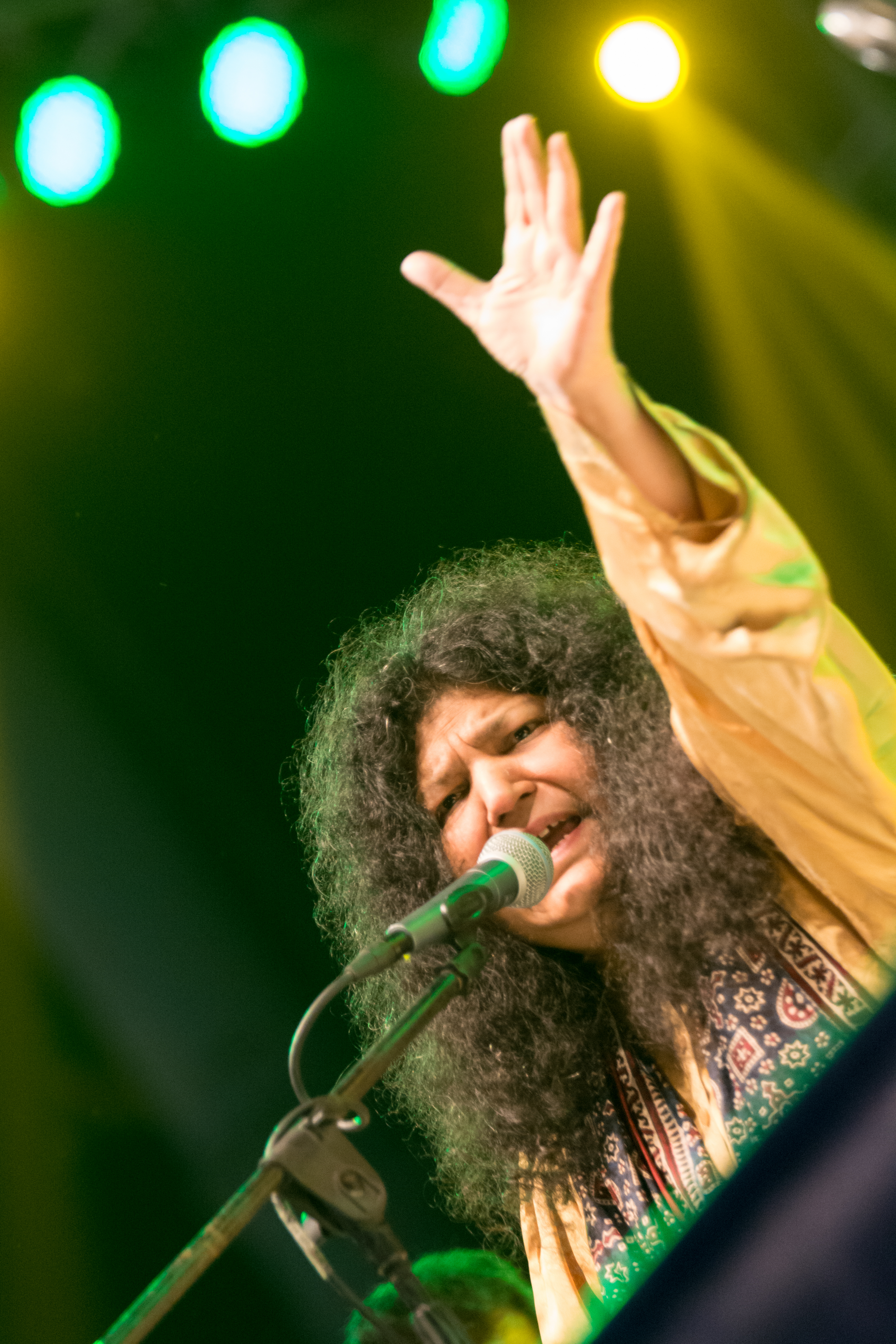
Abida Parveen

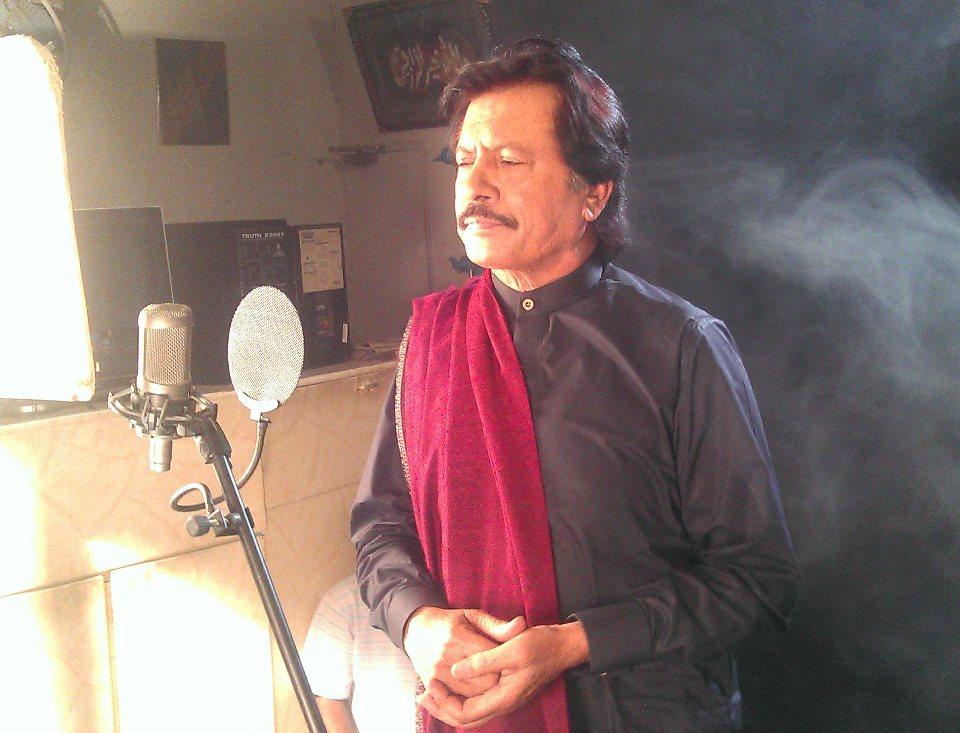
Attaullah Khan Esakhelvi

For more folk singers by their letter specifications you can find it below.

== A ==
- Alam Lohar
- Abida Parveen
- Arif Lohar
- Attaullah Khan Esakhelvi
- Allan Fakir

== F ==
- Farida Khanum

== G ==
- Ghulam Ali

== I ==
- Iqbal Bahu

== M ==
- Mai Bhaghi

== P ==
- Pathanay Khan

== R ==
- Rahim Shah
- Reshma

== S ==
- Saieen Zahoor
- Shaukat Ali
- Sanam Marvi

== T ==
- Tufail Niazi

== See also ==
- Music of Pakistan
- Music of South Asia
- Culture of Pakistan
- List of Pakistanis
