= Gurmeet Bawa =

Indian folk singer (1944–2021)

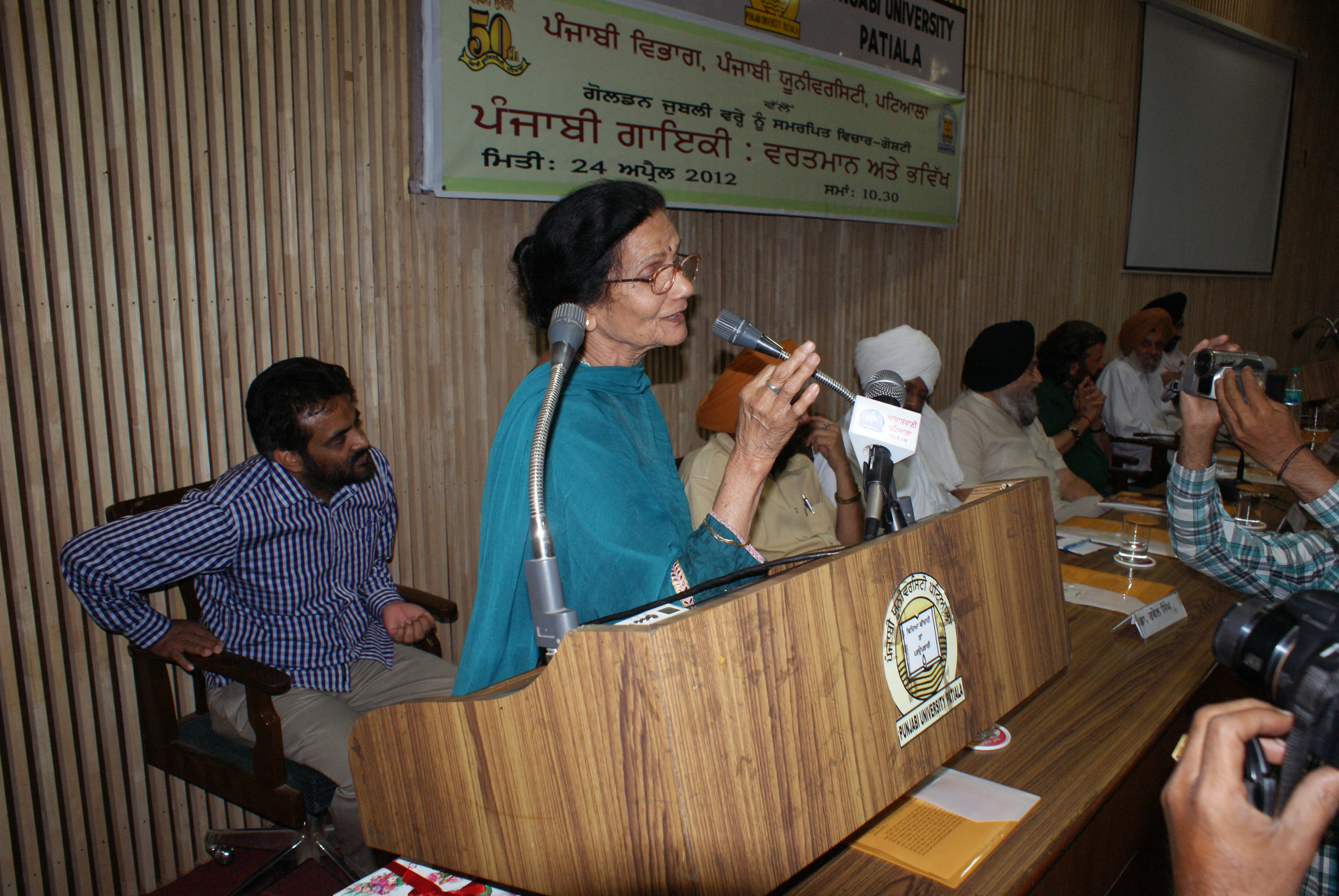

Background information
- Born: 18 February 1944; Kothe, Punjab, British India
- Died: 21 November 2021 (aged 77) Amritsar, Punjab, India
- Genres: Punjabi folk
- Occupation: Singer
- Years active: 1968–2021

Gurmeet Bawa (18 February 1944 – 21 November 2021) was an Indian Punjabi language folk singer. She was known as Lambi hek di malika (transl. Queen of singing in an extended breath) for her long hek (transl. holding breath during a song) that she could hold for about 45 seconds. She was the first Punjabi female singer to sing on Indian public service broadcaster, Doordarshan. She was awarded the Padma Bhushan by the Indian government in 2022.

== Early life ==
Gurmeet Bawa was born as Gurmeet Kaur in 1944, to father S. Uttam Singh and mother Ram Kaur, in the village of Kothe in British Punjab. The village is now a part of Gurdaspur district of Indian Punjab.

Her mother died when she was two years old. At that time, girls were not allowed to study or go out without elders' permission but Bawa, who dreamt of being a teacher, passed her Junior Basic Training exams and became the first woman from the region to be a teacher.

== Career ==
Bawa started her career in 1968. She sang with the Punjabi folk instruments, including alghoza, chimta, dholki and tumbi. In one of her initial performances, she impressed the audience in a function organised by the Punjab Association in Mumbai and received a standing ovation from Bollywood stars such as Prem Chopra, Pran, and Raj Kapoor. Kapoor famously requested boli, main jatti Punjab di, meri Nargis wargi akh.

She also performed overseas. She represented India during the festival of India organised in the USSR in 1987 and Japan in 1988. She performed at the Thailand Culture Center in Bangkok in 1988 and also represented the country in the Bosra festival and the 25th Jashan-E-Azadi festival in Tripoli, Libya, in 1989.

Bawa was known for her hek, or the ability to sing folk verses in a single breath and was known to have been able to do that for at least 45 seconds. This trait earned her the title Lambi hek di malika (transl. Queen of singing in an extended breath). Some of her notable singles included the cover for Jugni (transl. spirit of life). She was also the first Punjabi female singer to sing on Indian public service broadcaster Doordarshan. Some of her other popular songs included Ghorian (Punjabi wedding song) and Mirza (Punjabi saga of Mirza Sahiban). Her performances were accompanied by the alghoza, a wind instrument that was used by Punjabi folk singers. Pammi Bai credited her for popularising the alghoza, dhol, chimta and various Punjabi folk instruments.

== Personal life ==
Bawa was married to Kirpal Bawa, a Punjabi folk singer, with whom she had three daughters, of whom two, Lachi Bawa and Galori Bawa, are singers. She died in a hospital at Amritsar on 21 November 2021. She was aged 77. Her daughter, Lachi Bawa, had predeceased her in February 2020.

== Awards ==
Bawa was a recipient of the State Award by the Punjab government in 1991, Sangeet Puraskar by the Punjab Natak Akademi, the national Devi Ahillya Award by the Madhya Pradesh government in 2002, and the Shromani Gayika Award by the Punjabi language department in 2008. She was also the recipient of the Rashtrapati Puraskar by the Sangeet Natak Akademi.

In January 2022, Bawa was posthumously awarded the Padma Bhushan "for her distinguished contribution in the field of art".

== See also ==
- Narinder Biba
- Surinder Kaur
- Alam Lohar
