= Kanika Kapoor =

Indian singer (born 1978)

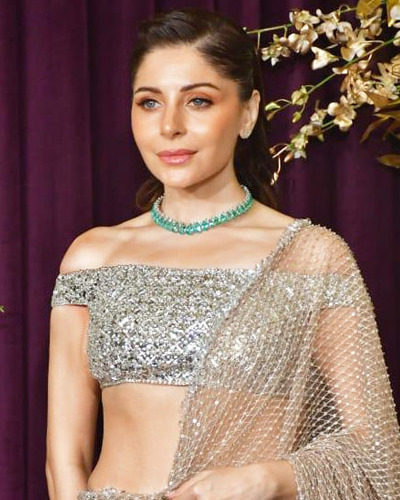
- Kapoor in 2024
- Born: 21 August 1978 (age 48); Lucknow, Uttar Pradesh, India
- Education: Bhatkhande Music Institute
- Occupations: Singer; composer
- Years active: 2012–present
- Spouses: Raj Chandok (m. 1999; div. 2012) Gautam Hathiramani (m. 2022; div. 2026)
- Awards: Full list
- Musical career
- Genres: Western; pop; filmi
- Instrument: Vocals
- Labels: T-Series; Zee Music Company

Kanika Kapoor (born 21 August 1978) is an Indian singer. She was born and raised in Lucknow. In 2012, she relocated to Mumbai to become a singer. Kapoor's first song "Jugni Ji" (2012) was for a music video–which became a commercial success. In 2014, she began her Bollywood playback singing career with the song "Baby Doll" for the film Ragini MMS 2. Upon its release, the song topped the music charts and Kapoor received wide critical acclaim and several accolades for her singing style, including the Filmfare Award for Best Female Playback Singer.

Kapoor subsequently earned widespread recognition and success for singing one of the Hindi cinema's top charted songs, including "Lovely" and "Kamlee" for the film Happy New Year (2014), "Chittiyaan Kalaiyaan" for the film Roy (2015), "Desi Look" for the film Ek Paheli Leela (2015), "Nachan Farrate" for the film All Is Well (2015), "Jugni Peeke Tight Hai" for the film Kis Kisko Pyaar Karoon (2015), "Jab Chaye Tera Jadoo" for the film Main Aur Charles (2015), "Neendein Khul Jaati Hain" for the film Hate Story 3 (2015), "Premika" for the film Dilwale (2015), the later of these rank among the highest-grossing Bollywood film. The song "Da Da Dasse" from the film Udta Punjab (2016), earned her several Best Playback Singer awards and nominations—following which she sang the songs, "Hug Me" from Beiimaan Love (2016), "Luv Letter" from the film The Legend of Michael Mishra (2016), "Beat Pe Booty" from the film A Flying Jatt (2016) and "Shake Karaan" from the film Munna Michael (2017), all of which earned her further success.

In March 2020, after returning from London, she attended a number of parties with Indian politicians and VIPs at Hotel Taj, Lucknow, despite India's Ministry of Health's home quarantine advisory against Coronavirus at the time. Subsequently, she tested positive for COVID-19. A complaint was lodged against her for her negligence.

== Early life ==
Kanika Kapoor was born on 21 August 1978 in Lucknow, Uttar Pradesh into a Khatri family, to parents: Rajeev Kapoor, a businessman, and Poonam Kapoor, a boutique owner. where she also studied music. At the age of 12, Kapoor started to study classical music under musician Pandit Ganesh Prasad Mishra from Varanasi and was accompanied by him to classical concerts around India. Kapoor participated in many music competitions at school in her childhood. At the age of 15, she did a stint with All India Radio and also accompanied bhajan singer Anup Jalota in his shows. She did her B.A. and then Masters in music from Bhatkhande Music Institute in Lucknow. She then moved to Mumbai to pursue her music career.

== Personal life ==
Kanika Kapoor married Raj Chandok, an NRI general practitioner, in 1999 and moved to London with her husband, with whom she has three children, two daughters Aayana & Samara and a son Yuvraaj. She separated from her husband in 2012 and moved back to her parents home in Lucknow. The couple divorced in 2012.

On 20 May 2022, she married NRI businessman Gautam Hathiramani after dating him for a few years. They divorced in Nov 2026.

== Career ==
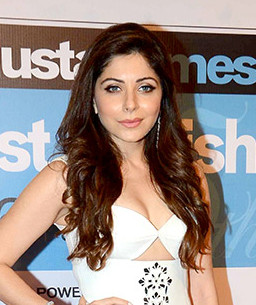
Kapoor at the HT Most Stylish Awards 2016

In 2013, Kapoor released the music video "Jugni Ji", featuring Dr. Zeus. The track was the remix version of the Pakistani Sufi song "Alif Allah", originally sung by Arif Lohar and Meesha Shafi at the third season of the musical series Coke Studio Pakistan in 2010. Upon the release, "Jugni Ji" went on to become one of the biggest singles of 2012 and Kapoor earned the Brit Asia TV Music Award for Best Single. By the success of "Jugni Ji", Meet Bros Anjjan asked Kapoor to sing the song "Baby Doll" for the film Ragini MMS 2 (2014), which marked her Bollywood singing debut. The song created hype over its release and topped the charts with winning Mirchi Music Awards for the "Number One Song of the Year" award. Kapoor was critically praised for her singing style and went on to win several awards, including the Filmfare Award for Best Female Playback Singer. The same year she collaborated again with Dr. Zeus along with Vishal–Shekhar for the song "Lovely" in Happy New Year which was picturised on Deepika Padukone. The soundtrack of the album also includes a Punjabi remix of the song titled "Kamlee". Both the songs "Lovely" and "Kamlee" received generally positive reviews and were proved to be a major success.

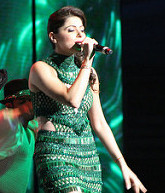
Kapoor performing at "SLAM! The Tour"

That same year, she participated in a concert tour across North America, entitled "SLAM! The Tour", in which she performed alongside Shah Rukh Khan and Deepika Padukone. Apart from concerts and tours, she has also been signed by an NGO for children, as their brand ambassador, where she promoted the cause of children's education. She also relaunched her own fashion brand "Kanika Kapoor: House of Chikankari" to help the female artisans in Lucknow and develop this art of embroidery and textile decoration.

In the year 2015, she collaborated again with Meet Bros Anjjan for the song "Chittiyaan Kalaiyaan" in Roy, which became a huge critical and commercial success and was the playback singer for Sunny Leone in the song "Desi Look" in the movie Ek Paheli Leela. The song was her last collaboration with Zeus and parted ways with him due to his false claim of being the producer and composer of the song "Baby Doll". She collaborated third time with Meet Bros Anjjan for the song "Nachan Farrate" for the movie All Is Well. She sang "Neendein Khul Jaati Hain" for the film Hate Story 3, collaborating fourth time with Meet Bros. She also sang a welcome song titled "Hello Namstey" for India's Prime Minister Narendra Modi when he attended a gathering at Wembley Stadium, London on 13 November 2015.

She regularly arranges and takes part in live shows and concerts. In 2016, she paired up with various composers including Amit Trivedi, Raghav Sachar. In an interview, she said that she will now concentrate more on Sufi and classical tracks. She will also release her songs as singles.

In 2016, she was made the brand ambassador of Swiss Watch manufacturer 88 Rue du Rhone, an independent brand by Raymond Weil. In 2019, Kapoor was one of the judges on the third season of the singing reality show The Voice. In 2025, she was featured on the songs "Durga Trance" alongside Raja Kumari and Siroyi, and "The Legend of Kumbha" alongside Raghav Mehta and Kalyani Nair from the album, Sounds of Kumbha, by Grammy-nominated producer Siddhant Bhatia. The album went on to be nominated at the 68th Annual Grammy Awards in the category for Best Global Music Album.

== Controversy ==
Kapoor was tested positive for COVID-19 during the COVID-19 pandemic on 20 March 2020. She returned to India from London on 9 March, whereupon she later threw a party for her family and friends in Lucknow. Her father, Rajiv Kapoor, stated she attended three parties, which Kanika Kapoor denied. Upon Kapoor testing positive for COVID-19, and updating about it on Twitter; former chief minister of Rajasthan Vasundhara Raje stated in a tweet that herself, and her son had met Kapoor at a party, and later went in a self imposed quarantine till their reports came back as negative.

The party in question was attended by several prominent personalities, and bureaucrats including former chief minister of Rajasthan Vasundhara Raje, her son – incumbent MP Dushyant Singh, and Uttar Pradesh's state minister of medical, and health Jai Pratap Singh.

Dushyant Singh later attended Parliament of India. As the party was attended by a few politicians, a domino effect lead to the quarantine of six members of parliament, the health minister of Uttar Pradesh Jai Pratap Singh, former chief minister of Rajasthan Vasundhara Raje, two top bureaucrats in the central government, three members of the legislative assembly of UP, and other bureaucratic elites went into self-quarantine on the same day when Kapoor made her test result public.

Dushyant Singh later also met the President of India, as a result, Rashtrapati Bhawan cancelled all plans, and engagements of President of India indefinitely.

Chief medical officer lodged complaint against Kapoor. The FIR says:

[...]when the singer was screened at the Lucknow airport on March 14, "high viral load was detected". She was advised home quarantine, but the advice was disregarded.

The complaint was filed under Sections 188, 269, and 270 of the Indian Penal Code. The CMO later admitted to lapses in his report which was used to file the case against the singer. He clarified that the singer was not screened at Amausi airport, Lucknow, and was actually advised to undertake a 14-day self-isolation as per government guidelines when she landed at Mumbai airport from the UK.

While Kapoor was denying attending any social gathering, except one small family gathering, video of her playing holi with many people, and photos from the party including political elites went viral. After returning from the UK, Kapoor has attended three parties in Lucknow, one in Kanpur and has been part of at least two other public gatherings. Kapoor has been facing severe criticism on Twitter and other internet platforms for her negligence, and contradictory statements.

The test reports of 64 people out of around 300 that she interacted with, came out to be negative. On 24 March 2020, the second COVID-2019 test which was conducted due to the doubt created in the mind of her family members, came out to be positive. She tested positive for third time on 27 March. She was previously tested on 20, and 23 March. She was tested positive for the fifth consecutive time on 31 March. On 4 April, her sixth test came negative for coronavirus. As of 5 April, there have not been positive cases of the disease reported from the people who were in contact with Kapoor. Following the second negative report for COVID-19 she was discharged from the hospital on 6 April 2020. While being in the quarantine, she released a statement, stating that she was screened at Mumbai airport and didn't show any symptoms. Upon her arrival in Lucknow, there was no screening setup and was not screened. Upon showing symptoms, she had herself tested and announced it after her reports came out positive.

== Discography ==
| Denotes films that have not yet been released |

| Year | Film/Album | Song(s) | Composer(s) | Note(s) | Ref(s) |
|---|---|---|---|---|---|
| 2012 | Alif Allah | "Jugni Ji" | Dr. Zeus | | |
| 2014 | Ragini MMS 2 | "Baby Doll" | Meet Bros Anjjan | | |
| 2014 | Ragini MMS 2 | "Baby Doll (Remix Version) | Meet Bros Anjjan | | |
| 2014 | Happy New Year | "Lovely" | Dr. Zeus, Vishal–Shekhar | | |
| 2014 | Happy New Year | "Kamlee" | Dr. Zeus, Vishal–Shekhar | | |
| 2015 | Roy | "Chittiyaan Kalaiyaan" | Meet Bros Anjjan | | |
| 2015 | Roy | Chittiyaan Kalaiyaan (MBA Swag) | Meet Bros Anjjan (Remix by: MBA feat. DJ Shilpi) | | |
| 2015 | Roy | "Chittiyaan Kalaiyaan (Remix)" | Meet Bros Anjjan (Remix by: Kuwar Virk) | | |
| 2015 | NH10 | "Chhil Gaye Naina" | Sanjeev–Darshan | | |
| 2015 | Ek Paheli Leela | "Desi Look" | Dr. Zeus | | |
| 2015 | Ek Paheli Leela | "Desi Look (Remix)" | Dr. Zeus (Remix by: DJ Chetas) | | |
| 2015 | Ten Cricket Project | "We Could Be Heroes" (Recreated Song) | Alesso | | |
| 2015 | All Is Well | "Nachan Farrate" | Meet Bros | | |
| 2015 | All Is Well | "Nachan Farrate (MB Swag) | Meet Bros | | |
| 2015 | Kis Kisko Pyaar Karoon | "Jugni Peeke Tight Hai (Version 1)" | Amjad Nadeem | | |
| 2015 | The Big Indian Wedding | "Teddy Bear" | Kanika Kapoor | | |
| 2015 | Main Aur Charles | "Jab Chaye Tera Jadoo" | Sanjeev-Darshan | | |
| 2015 | Hate Story 3 | "Neendein Khul Jaati Hain" | Meet Bros | | |
| 2015 | Super Girl From China | "Super Girl From China" | Kanika Kapoor | | |
| 2015 | Dilwale | "Premika" | Pritam | | |
| 2015 | Dilwale | "Tukur Tukur" | Pritam | | |
| 2016 | Kyaa Kool Hain Hum 3 | "Jawaani Le Doobi" | Sajid–Wajid | | |
| 2016 | Teraa Surroor | Ishq Samundar (Reloaded) | Himesh Reshammiya (Originally composed by Anand Raj Anand) | | |
| 2016 | Udta Punjab | "Da Da Dasse" | Amit Trivedi | | |
| 2016 | Do Lafzon Ki Kahani | "Ankhiyaan" | Arjuna Harjai | | |
| 2016 | Beiimaan Love | "Hug Me" | Raghav Sachar | | |
| 2016 | Great Grand Masti | "Teri Kamar Ko" | Sanjeev–Darshan | | |
| 2016 | The Legend of Michael Mishra | "Luv Letter" | Meet Bros | | |
| 2016 | A Flying Jatt | "Beat Pe Booty | Sachin–Jigar | | |
| 2016 | Jaguar | "Selfie" | S. S. Thaman | Kannada song | |
| 2016 | Rokto | "Dana Kata Pori" | Akassh | Bengali song | |
| 2016 | Tutak Tutak Tutiya | "Tutak Tutak Tutiya" (Title Song) | Raaj Ashoo | | |
| 2017 | Munna Michael | "Shake Karaan" | Meet Bros | | |
| 2017 | Resham Da Rumaal | "Resham Da Rumaal" | Band of Brothers | | |
| 2017 | T-Series Mixtape | "Ambarsariya/Suit Suit" | Abhijit Vaghani" | | |
| 2017 | Pieces Of Me | "Kurti Mal Mal Di" | Tigerstyle | | |
| 2017 | Tera Intezaar | Abhagi Piya Ki | Raaj Aashoo | | |
| 2017 | T-Series Mixtape Punjabi | "Marjaani/Lovely" | Abhijit Vaghani | | |
| 2018 | Ba Baa Black Sheep | "Galla Goriyaa/Aaja Soniye" | Gourov-Roshin, Shaan | | |
| 2018 | Nachdi Firangi | "Nachdi Firangi" | Meet Bros | | |
| 2018 | Pretty Girl | "Pretty Girl" | Kanika Kapoor | | |
| 2018 | Cheater Mohan | "Cheater Mohan" | Kanika Kapoor | | |
| 2018 | Thade Rahiyo | "Thade Rahiyo" | Meet Bros | | |
| 2018 | Baazaar | "Chodd Diya" | Kanika Kapoor | | |
| 2018 | Baazaar | "Chodd Doya (unplugged)" | Kanika Kapoor | | |
| 2019 | T-Series Electro Folk | "Genda Phool" | Aditya Dev | | |
| 2019 | Hume Tumse Pyaar Kitna | "Manmohini" | Raaj Aashoo & DJ Emenes (MIB), Vicky & Hardik | | |
| 2019 | T-Series Mixtape Punjabi 2 | "Roi Na/Maahi Ve" | Abhijit Vaghani | | |
| 2019 | Ragini MMS: Returns 2 | "Hello Ji" | Meet Bros | | |
| 2021 | Hello Charlie | "Soneya Ve" | Kanika Kapoor | | |
| 2021 | Pushpa: The Rise (D) | "Oo Antava Oo Oo Antava" | Devi Sri Prasad | | |
| 2023 | Bholaa | "Pan Dukaniya" | Ravi Basrur | Lyrics by Irshad Kamil; co-sung with Swaroop Khan | |
| 2025 | Mere Husband Ki Biwi | "Gori Hai Kalaiyan" | Badshah, Akshay & IP | | |

== Awards ==
- Brit Asia TV Music Awards
  - 2012 Best Single for "Jugni Ji", with Dr Zeus
  - 2012 Best Female Act
  - 2014 Best Female Act
  - 2015 Bollywood Record of the Year for "Lovely" with Dr Zeus
  - 2015 Best Bollywood Act
  - 2015 Best Female Act
- BIG Star Entertainment Awards
  - 2014 Most Entertaining Female Singer for "Lovely" from Happy New Year
- Filmfare Awards
  - 2015 Best Female Playback Singer for "Baby Doll" from Ragini MMS 2
- IIFA Awards
  - 2015 Best Female Playback Singer for "Baby Doll" from Ragini MMS 2
  - 2016 Best Female Playback Singer for "Chittiyaan Kalaiyaan" from Roy
- Mirchi Music Awards
  - 2014 Nominated: Female Vocalist of The Year for "Baby Doll" from Ragini MMS 2
  - 2014 Nominated: Upcoming Female Vocalist of The Year for "Baby Doll" from Ragini MMS 2
- Screen Awards
  - 2015 Nominated: Best Female Playback Singer for "Baby Doll" from Ragini MMS 2
- Stardust Awards
  - 2014 Best Playback Singer – Female for "Baby Doll" from Ragini MMS 2
- Star Guild Awards
  - 2015 Best Female Playback Singer for "Baby Doll" from Ragini MMS 2
- Producers Guild Film Awards
  - 2016 Best Female Playback Singer for "Chittiyaan Kalaiyaan" from Roy
- Global Indian Music Academy Awards
  - 2016 Best Female Playback Singer for "Chittiyaan Kalaiyaan" from Roy

== See also ==
- List of Indian playback singers
