= Gagar =

Punjabi musical instrument and metal pitcher

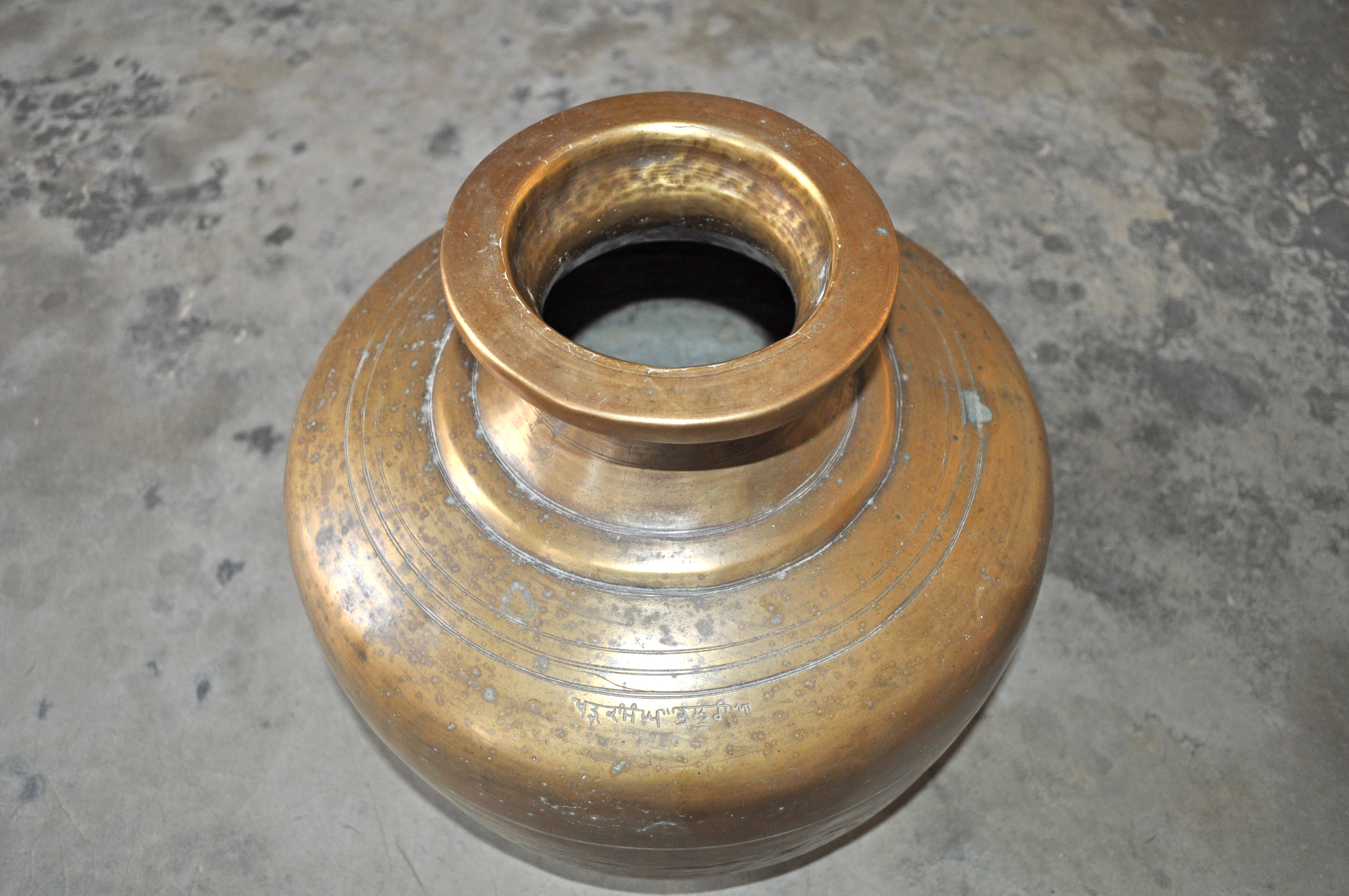
Metal pitcher used to store water and as a musical beat instrument

Gagar (Punjabi: ਗਾਗਰ, pronounced: gāger), a metal pitcher used to store water in earlier days, is also used as a musical instrument in number of Punjabi folk songs and dances. It is played with both hands with rings worn on fingers. It is closely associated with the other music instrument, Gharha, which is an earthen pitcher. Gagar is traditionally used by milk venders as milk container also in Majha region (Amritsar, Gurdaspur and Tarantaran districts) of Punjab.

== Gallery ==
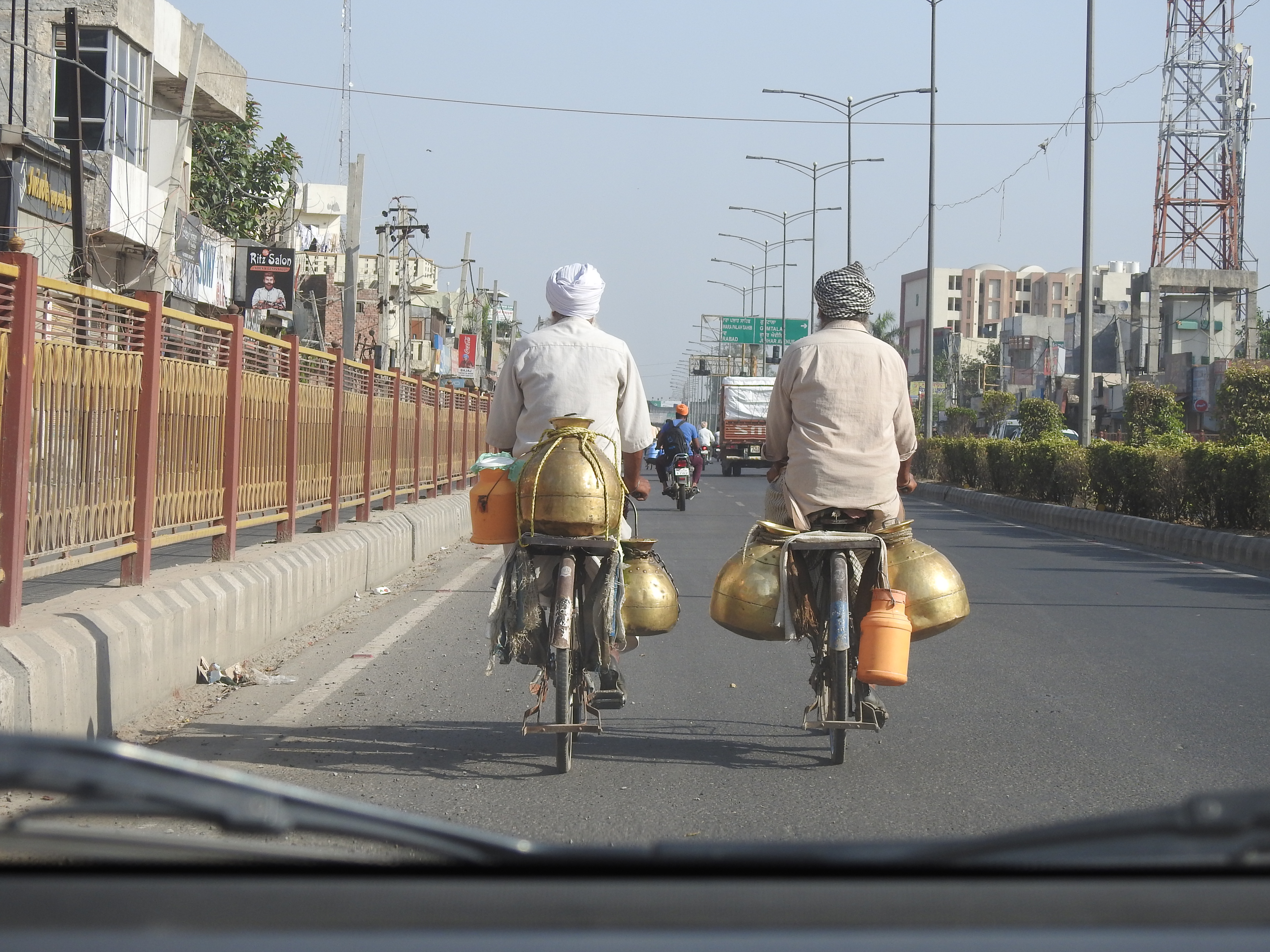
Milk vendor with typical traditional brass containers, called Gagar, used in the Majha region of Punjab

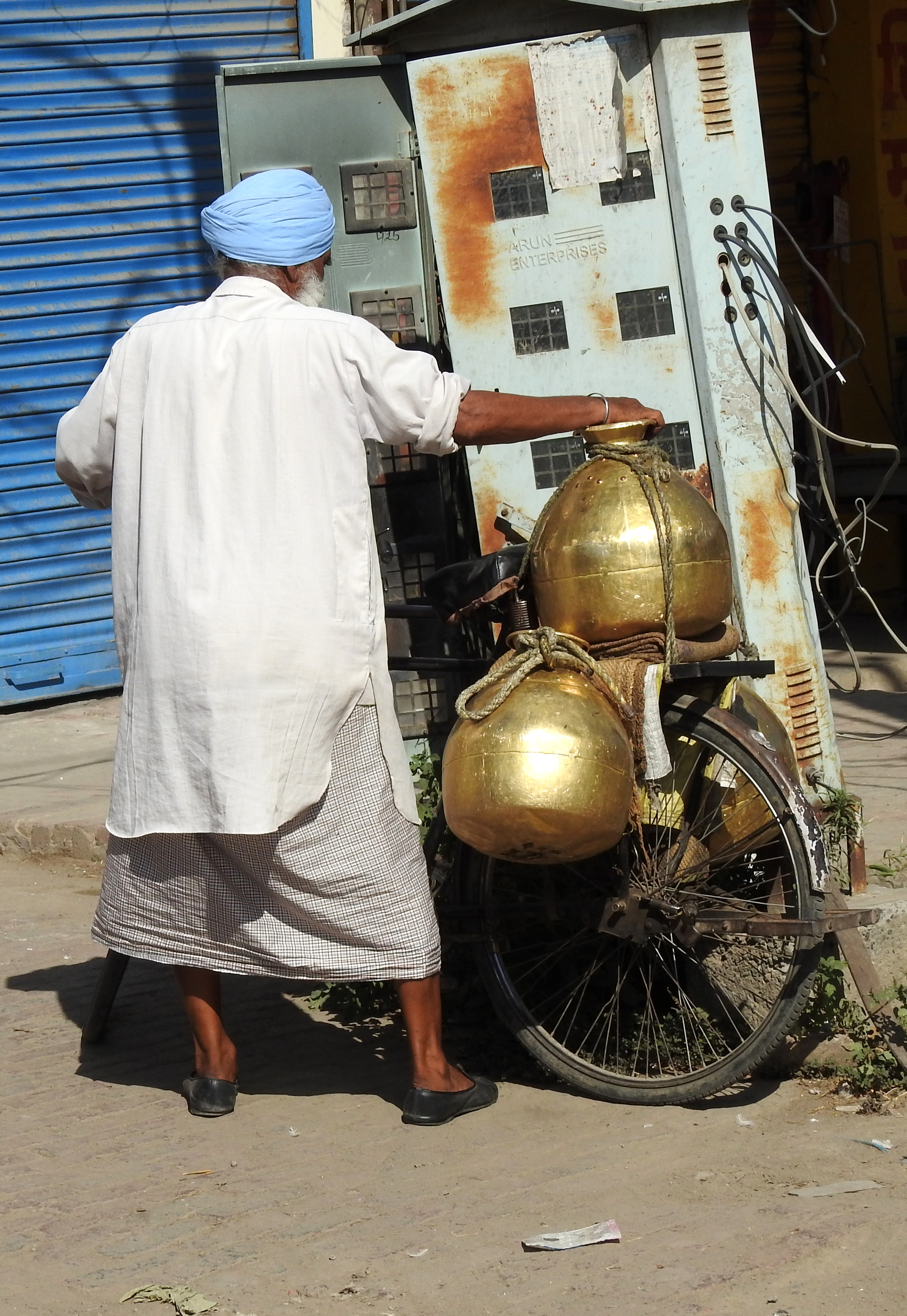
Milk vendor with typical traditional brass containers, called Gagar, used in the Majha region of Punjab

== See also ==
- Rohtas (disambiguation)
- Punjab
