= Alif Allah (Jugni) =

Punjabi Sufi song

Song by Arif Lohar and Meesha Shafi

from the album Coke Studio S3E1
- Language: Punjabi
- Released: 6 June 2010
- Genre: Sufi Rock, Contemporary Folk Music, Folk Revival
- Length: 8:43
- Label: Coke Studio
- Composer: Arif Lohar
- Producers: Rohail Hyatt; Umber Hyatt

Alif Allah (Jugni) (Punjabi: الف اللہ - جگنی), also known as Alif Allah Chambe Di Booti (Punjabi: الف اللہ چمبے دی بوٹی) is a popular Punjabi Sufi song that was composed and sung by Arif Lohar and Meesha Shafi in Coke Studio Pakistan. The lyrics of the song are based on the works of the 17th century Sufi poet Sultan Bahu. It is an adaptation of Punjabi folk "Jugni" in a Sufi version.

Alif Allah (Jugni) rose to popularity after being sung by Lohar and Shafi on Coke Studio. The associated video on YouTube had 108 million views by September 2025.

== Adaptation in films and television ==
The song has also been used in the following movies:

1. Pakistani Lollywood Punjabi language film Jugni - 2011
2. Bollywood movie Cocktail where it was sung by Arif Lohar and Harshdeep Kaur. - 2012
3. Bollywood movie Diary of a Butterfly - 2012
4. Ta'Wiz - 2018 (Upcoming Hum TV program)

"Jugni Ji"

Song by Kanika Kapoor and Dr Zeus
- Language: Punjabi
- Released: 2012
- Length: 3:29
- Composer: Arif Lohar

Music video
- "Jugni Ji" on YouTube

"Jugni 2.0"

Song by Kanika Kapoor, Mumzy Stranger, DJ Lyan
- Language: Punjabi
- Released: 2020
- Length: 3:04
- Label: Zee Music Company, JJust Music
- Composer: Arif Lohar
- Producer: Jackky Bhagnani

Music video
