= Asa Singh Mastana =

Padamshri S.Asa Singh Mastana
- Asa Singh Mastana Show, 1980

Background information
- Born: August 22 1927; Lahore, Punjab
- Died: May 23 1999
- Occupation: Singer

Asa Singh Mastana ਆਸਾਂ ਸਿੰਘ ਮਸਤਾਨਾ (1926–1999) was a Punjabi musician and singer best known for lending his voice to the hit bollywood movie dooj ka chand and singing jugni and Heer-genre of folk songs, which recount the tales of Heer Ranjha by poet Waris Shah. He became popular in the 1940s, by the mid-1960s, when state-run All India Radio started promoting folk musicians, this made him, along with Surinder Kaur, Pushpa Hans, Madan Bala Sidhu, and Prakash Kaur, a singer of cult status.

His well-known songs, among others "Balle Ni Panjaab Diye Sher Bachiye", "Doli Charhdeyan Marian Heer Cheekaan" and "Kali Teri Gut", have served as templates for later Punjabi musicians. His great work also expands to singing sad songs like "Jadon Meri Arthi Utha Ke Chalan Ge".

In 1985, he was awarded the Padma Shri by the Government of India.

== Discography ==
- Best of Asa Singh Mastana and Surinder Kaur
- Hits of Asa Singh Mastana & Pushpa Hans
- Heer
- Mastana Masti Wich
- "Mutiare Jana Door Pya" (1970)
- Sarke Sarke Jandiye Mutiare Ni
