= Alam Lohar =

Folk singer

- حاجی محمد عالم لوہار
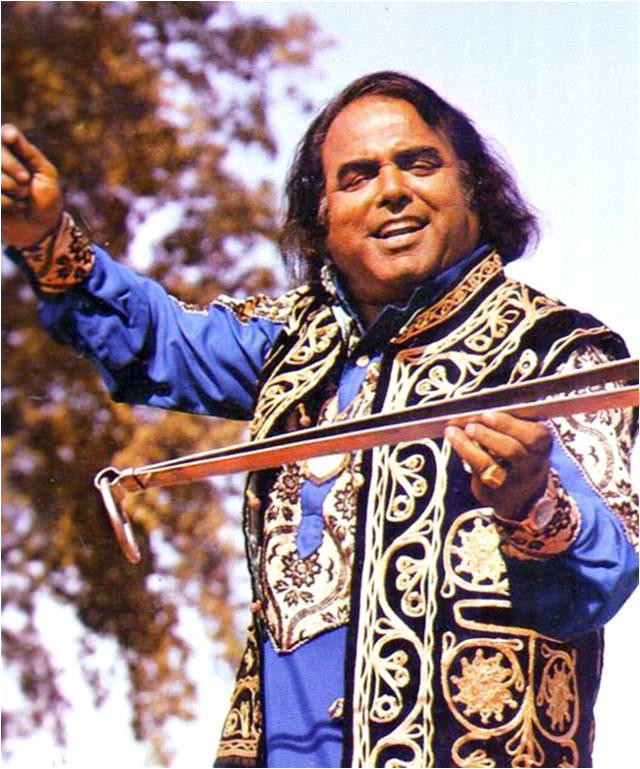
- Born: Muhammad Alam Lohar; 1928; Village Achh near Kotla Arab Ali Khan, Gujrat District, Punjab, British India (now Punjab, Pakistan)
- Died: 3 July 1979 (aged 50–51); Sham ki Bhattian, Punjab, Pakistan
- Occupations: Singer, musician, poet
- Years active: 1936 – 1979
- Known for: Punjabi folk music, Chimta playing
- Awards: Pride of Performance Award by the President of Pakistan in 1979

Alam Lohar (Punjabi: محمد عالم لوہار) was a Pakistani Punjabi folk music singer. He is widely regarded as the greatest singer of Punjabi folk music.

He is credited with creating and popularising the music genre or narrative device Jugni.

== Early life ==
Alam Lohar was born in 1928 in Achh, near Kotla Arab Ali Khan, Gujrat District of Punjab, British India. He was born into a Punjabi Muslim family of Lohars (blacksmiths). As a child, Lohar read Sufiana Kalaam, a collection of Punjabi stories and poetry and started singing from a childhood age.

== Career ==
Alam Lohar modified a new style of singing the Punjabi Vaar, an epic or folk tale which made him popular when he toured villages and towns in the Punjab region. He is famous for his rendition of Waris Shah's Heer along with other songs such as Saif ul Maluk. He recorded his first album at the age of 13 and throughout his career he accomplished 15 Gold Disc LPs (record sales) for the following with mainly EMI/His Master's Voice Pakistan and other regional companies within Pakistan: Jugni (1965), Saif ul Mulook (1948), Qissa Yusuf Zulaykha (1961), Bol Mitti de Bawa (1964), Dilwala Dukhra (1975). In memory of an accident where he sustained a leg injury and his call for help went unanswered, he wrote the lyrics.... Wajan Mariyan Bulaya (1977), Qissa Mirza Sahiban (1967), Qissa Hirni (1963), Maa Da Pyaar (1971), Heer (1969), Qissa Sassi Pannu (1972), Qissa Baraa Maa (1974), Jis Din Mera Vayaah Howega (1973), Qissa Dhulla Bhatti (1959), Mirza De Maa (1968).

In his childhood he used to read Sufi poetry (sufiana kalaam), Punjabi folk stories and participate as a young child in local gatherings expressing a vocal only art form in reading passages of great poets. Then he started going to festivals and gatherings on a regular basis and with these performances, he rose to become one of the notable singers in South Asia during the 1970s.

In the 1970s, Alam Lohar started to tour different countries including United Kingdom, Canada, Norway, United States and Germany to entertain the South Asian communities living in those countries.

== Death ==
Alam Lohar died in an accident near Shamki Bhattian on 3 July 1979 when a heavily loaded truck collided with his vehicle while attempting to overtake it. He was buried on the outskirts of Lalamusa on GT Road in Pakistan.

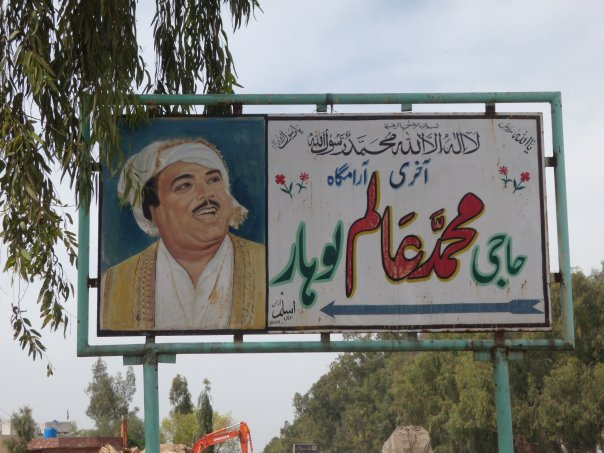
Sign directing visitors to the burial place of Alam Lohar in Lalamusa, Punjab, Pakistan.

== Death and legacy ==
Throughout the period from the 1950s until his death in 1979, he had dominated folk singing in Pakistan and was a major singer in Punjabi and Sufi singing worldwide.

Alam Lohar's death was unexpected, many singers in Pakistan and India, including Noor Jehan, Nusrat Fateh Ali Khan and Lal Chand Yamla Jatt, expressed sadness on the passing of Alam Lohar in a television broadcast on the 10th anniversary of Alam's death.

He had eight sons, including Arif Lohar who followed the tradition of his father and is also regarded as a famous folk singer in Pakistan.

Some of Alam Lohar's songs have achieved critical acclaim and have contributed to the music and culture of the Punjab, most notably Jugni, Bol Mitti De Baweya, Mirza Sahiban (he was the main Punjabi singer to bring this story into a song format singing in a very distinct style – Jhori (double flute) & Chimta with a high pitch vocal) Wajan Mariyan Bulaya, Saif-ul-mulook, Dil Wala Dukhra and Shahbaz Qualander (Dhamaal). Alam Lohar is regarded as one of Pakistan's iconic performers who still remains popular in the region.

In memory of Alam Lohar the Government of Pakistan has named a road after him which runs from his birth village Aach to the main Grand Truck Road which is known as 'Alam Lohar Road'.

In memory of Alam Lohar, there is a visual theatre depiction of him performing which is on display at the Lok Virsa Museum in Islamabad.

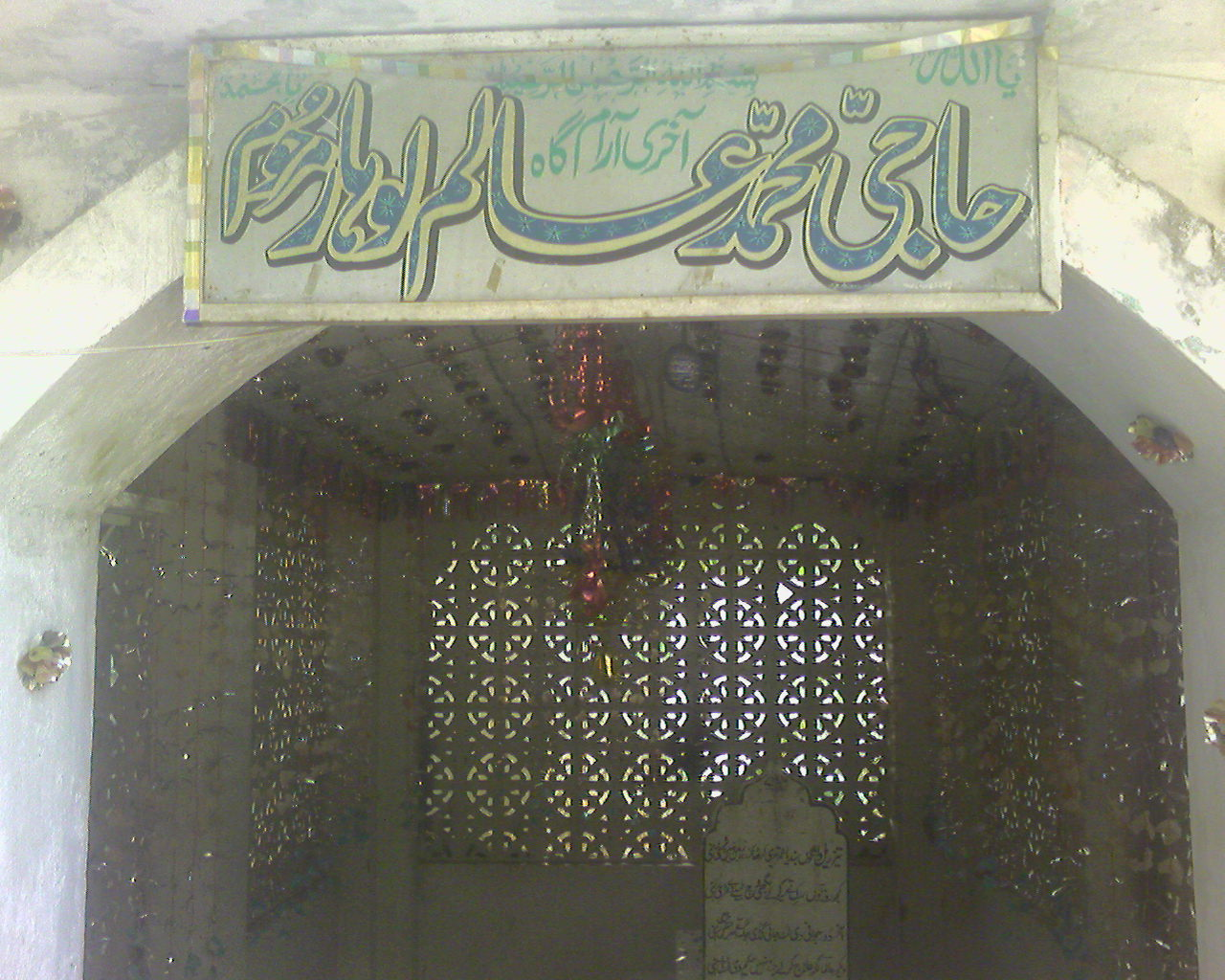
Alam's grave at GT Road Lalamusa

== Awards and recognition ==
- Pride of Performance Award by the President of Pakistan in 1979.
