= Noor Pur 122 JB =

Pakistani settlement

Noor Pur 122 JB نورپور
- Union Council
- Noor Pur 122 JB
- Location within Punjab, Pakistan Location within Pakistan
- Coordinates: 31°27′26.5″N 73°05′40.8″E
- Country: Pakistan
- Province: Punjab
- District: Faisalabad District
- Time zone: UTC+5 (PST)
- Calling code: 041

Noor Pur 122 JB (Urdu نورپور) was a village on Millat Road, Faisalabad. Now it part of the city of Faisalabad. 122 JB Gokhowal was on the north side. There is big Fruit and vegetable market in main bazaar of Noor pur People of Millat road mostly do shopping from Noorpur Bazaar.

== Main Residential Colonies ==
in the area of Noor Pur there are many residential colonies.

- Green Town
- Usman Town
- Muslim Town
