= Achh =

آچھ
- Union council and village
- Location in Pakistan
- Coordinates: 32°52′N 74°8′E
- Country: Pakistan
- Region: Punjab
- District: Gujrat
- Tehsil: Kharian
- Time zone: UTC+5 (PST)
  - Summer (DST): UTC+5 (PDT)
- Area code: 0537564000

Achh is a village and union council of Gujrat District, in the Punjab province of Pakistan. It is part of Kharian Tehsil and is located at 32°52'0N 74°8'0E with an altitude of 311 metres. Achh is the birthplace of famous Punjabi folk singer Alam Lohar and his son Arif Lohar.
