= Rohtas =

Rohtas may refer to:

== Places ==
=== India ===
- Rohtas Plateau, plateau in south-western Bihar
  - Rohtas Fort, India or Rohtasgarh, fort in Bihar
  - Rohtas district, district in Bihar, named after the fort
    - Rohtas block, village development block in the district, situated near the fort
- Rohtas Nagar Assembly constituency, constituency of the Delhi Legislative Assembly

=== Pakistan ===
- Rohtas Fort, fort in Punjab, UNESCO World Heritage site

== People ==
- Rohtas Singh Dahiya, Indian wrestler

== Others ==
- Battle of Rohtas (1779), battle at the fort in Punjab, between the Durrani Empire and Sikh misls
