= Arif Lohar =

Pakistani Punjabi-language singer

Arif Lohar عارف لوہار
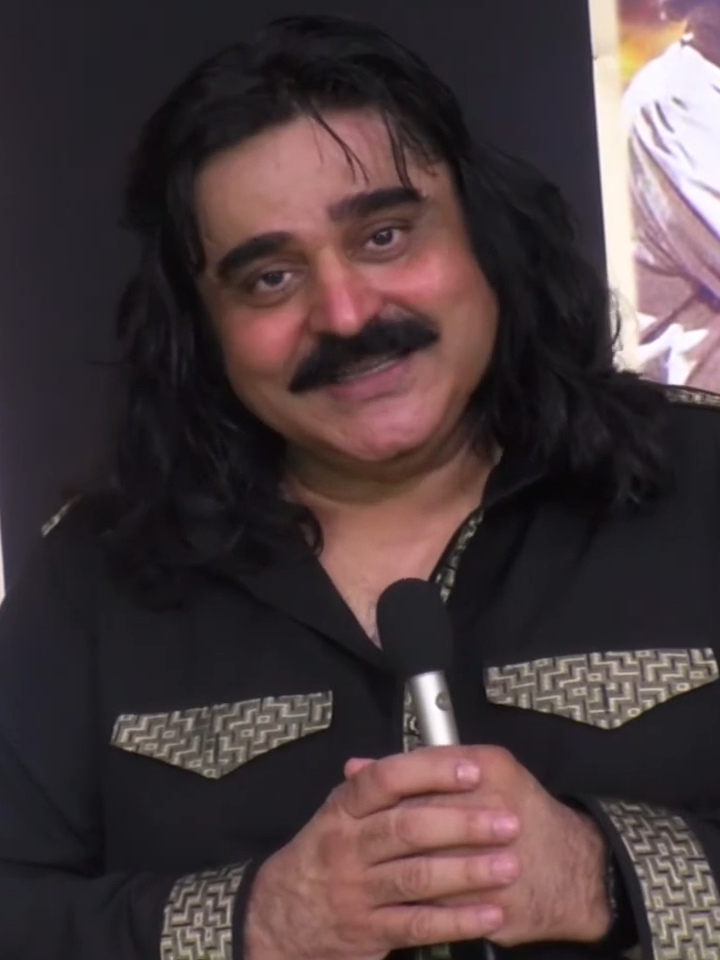
- Lohar in 2021

Background information
- Born: 18 April 1966 (age 60)
- Origin: Achh, Kharian Tehsil Gujrat District, West Pakistan (present-day Punjab, Pakistan)
- Genre: Punjabi folk music
- Occupations: Vocalist; musician
- Instrument: Chimta
- Label: Internalmusic UK
- Website: http://www.internalmusic.co.uk

Arif Lohar (Punjabi pronunciation: [aːɾɪf loːɦaːɾ]; born 18 April 1966) is a Pakistani singer associated with Punjabi folk music and an occasional actor.

The son of the renowned folk singer Alam Lohar, Arif Lohar became popular in Pakistan and India after his famous song "Jugni" with Nooran Lal in 2006. He usually sings accompanied by a native Punjabi musical instrument resembling tongs, called chimta. His folk music is representative of the traditional folk heritage of Punjab.

== Early life ==
Arif Lohar was born on 18 April 1966 in the village Achh to a Lohar Punjabi family. His father was Alam Lohar, who belonged to the village of Achh in Kharian Tehsil, Gujrat District, nearby Kotla Arab Ali Khan, and was a prominent folk singer. Due to this musical background, Arif Lohar alongside his seven brothers started singing at a young age.

== Music career ==
Arif Lohar has performed on more than 50 foreign tours around the world during the last 20 years, including performances in the UK, United States and the UAE.

In 2004, he performed in China for the opening of the Asian Games, in front of a crowd nearing 1 million. He once performed in North Korea for the late General Secretary Kim Jong-il as part of an international delegation of peace and goodwill.

In 2005, Arif Lohar was awarded the Pride of Performance Award by the Government of Pakistan. To date, he has more than 150 albums (including many Singles – LPs) to his credit and recorded more than 3,000 songs, mostly in the Punjabi language.

In 2006, he made headlines in the Punjabi music world by releasing his album "21st Century Jugni", with music produced, arranged, and mastered by Mukhtar Sahota in Wolverhampton, UK, which was released by Internalmusic UK.

In June 2010, Arif Lohar participated in Coke-Studio (a Pakistani live session programme by Rohail Hayat). During Coke-Studio season 3, Arif Lohar performed "Alif Allah (Jugni)" with upcoming musician Meesha Shafi. Lohar's performance for Coke Studio featured two other songs: "Mirza" and "Alif Allah Chambey Dey Booti/Jugni", the latter a collaboration that became an international success. Filmmaker Saif Ali Khan bought the rights to "Jugni" for use as a feature song in his Bollywood movie Cocktail. Other versions of "Jugni" have also been featured in Bollywood movies, including an adapted version that first appeared on "21st Century Jugni" album in the film Diary of a Butterfly. He also sang in the Bollywood film Bhaag Milkha Bhaag (2013).

He has also sung in multiple Punjabi films in Pakistan and India.

== Acting career ==
Arif Lohar has starred in around 45 movies, mostly in the Punjabi language.

He acted in and also produced three songs for the soundtrack of Syed Noor's film Jugni (2012), the highest-grossing Pakistani film of 2012.

== Other work ==
=== Philanthropy ===
In 2004, Arif's eldest brother, Dr Arshad Mahmood Lohar, formed Alam Lohar Memorial Trust (ALMT) in honour of their father.

An affiliate of the trust was a production studio which was created to design and raise awareness for health campaigns in the UK, including the Stop Smoking, and Healthy Mothers and Healthy Babies campaigns on behalf of the National Health Service. These campaigns targeted mainly Pakistani and other South Asian communities with health problems, and Arif performed concerts around the UK to promote it.

In September 2010, Arif Lohar began actively campaigning to help victims of the 2010 Pakistan floods. He appeared on national television to help encourage local and international fundraising, and also performed at special concerts throughout Pakistan.

== Discography ==
- Alif Allah (Jugni)
- Ek Pal
- Bol Mitti Diya Baawiya
- Sher Punjab Da
- Soniye
- Aakhian
- Bhaag Milkha Bhaag (2013)
- Punjab Bolda
- Paar Langadey Veh
- Yaara Kaulu Yaar Gwanchan
- Koka Saat Rang Dah
- Sianyah
- Ik Din Pyaar Da
- Mirza
- Jugni
- Panj Dariyah
- The Legend
- Kamlee Yaar dee Kamlee
- 21st Century Jugni (Mukhtar Sahota)
- Paar Channah De (Mitti De Baway)

== Awards and recognition ==
- Pride of Performance Award by the President of Pakistan in 2005
- Lifetime Achievement Award at Brit Asia TV Music Awards 2018

== See also ==
- Shaukat Ali
- Sanam Marvi
- Saieen Zahoor
- Music of Pakistan
- List of Pakistani folk singers
