= Chimta =

Type of musical instrument

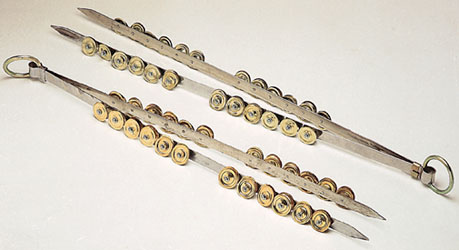

Percussion instrument
- Other names: Chimpta, simta, musical fire tongs
- Classification: idiophone

Related instruments
- Dhol

Musicians
- Alam Lohar, Arif Lohar, Kamal Heer

Chimta (Punjabi: ਚਿਮਟਾ, Shahmukhī: چمٹا ) literally means tongs. Over time it has evolved into a traditional musical instrument of South Asia by the permanent addition of small brass jingles. This instrument is often used in popular Punjabi folk songs, Bhangra music and the Sikh religious music known as Gurbani Kirtan.

The player of the chimta is able to produce a chiming sound by holding the joint of the instrument in one hand and striking the two sides of the chimta together. The jingles are made of metal and thus it produces a metallic sound and helps to keep up the beat of the song.

In Bhangra music or at weddings it is often combined with Dhol and Bhangra dancers.

== Construction and design ==
The chimta consists of a long, flat piece of steel or iron that is pointed at both ends, and folded over in the middle. A metal ring is attached near the fold, and there are jingles or rings attached along the sides at regular intervals. Sometimes there are seven pairs of jingles. The rings are plucked in a downward motion to produce tinkling sounds. Chimtas with large rings are used at rural festivals while ones with smaller rings are often used as an accompaniment to Bhangra dancers and singers of traditional Indian hymns.

== Notable players ==
The late Alam Lohar is famous for playing this instrument and introducing it to global audiences. Today, musicians like Kamal Heer and Arif Lohar play this instrument. Also known as the "rusty tambourine sword", the chimta has been played by members of the experimental rock band His Name Is Alive on recent tours.
