= Jugni (2011 film) =

2011 film

- Directed by: Syed Noor
- Written by: Syed Noor
- Produced by: Afzal M Khan, Syed Noor
- Starring: Saima, Arif Lohar
- Cinematography: Ali Jan
- Edited by: Z A Zulfi
- Music by: M. Arshad
- Release date: 30 August 2011
- Country: Pakistan
- Language: Punjabi

Jugni (2011) is a Pakistani Punjabi-language film, directed by Syed Noor. First named Jugni Nachdi Aye, the film's name was later changed to Jugni, The film brought folk singer Arif Lohar back on the silver screen after eleven years. It also stars Saima, Shaan Shahid and Moammar Rana.

== Story ==
The movie revolves around three men who fall in love with the same woman, Jugni (Saima). Rana and Shaan's characters are friends who are competing for Jugni's love.

== Music ==
The music was composed by M Arshad and has been a huge hit in Pakistan, specially in the Punjabi circuit. The title song, "Jugni," which has been released online, was recorded at the studio of Noor's Paragon Academy of Performing Arts (Papa). There are four other item songs sung by Arif Lohar including his Coke Studio hit "Alif Allah (Jugni)". Singers include Arif Lohar, Nooran Lal and Meesha Shafi.

== Cast ==
The music was composed by M Arshad, and the film songs' lyrics were written by Arif Lohar and Khursheed Kamal. This film did an average amount of business at the box office but had a couple super-hit film songs.

- Arif Lohar
- Saima
- Shaan Shahid
- Moammar Rana
- Nida Chaudhry
