= Prakash Kaur =

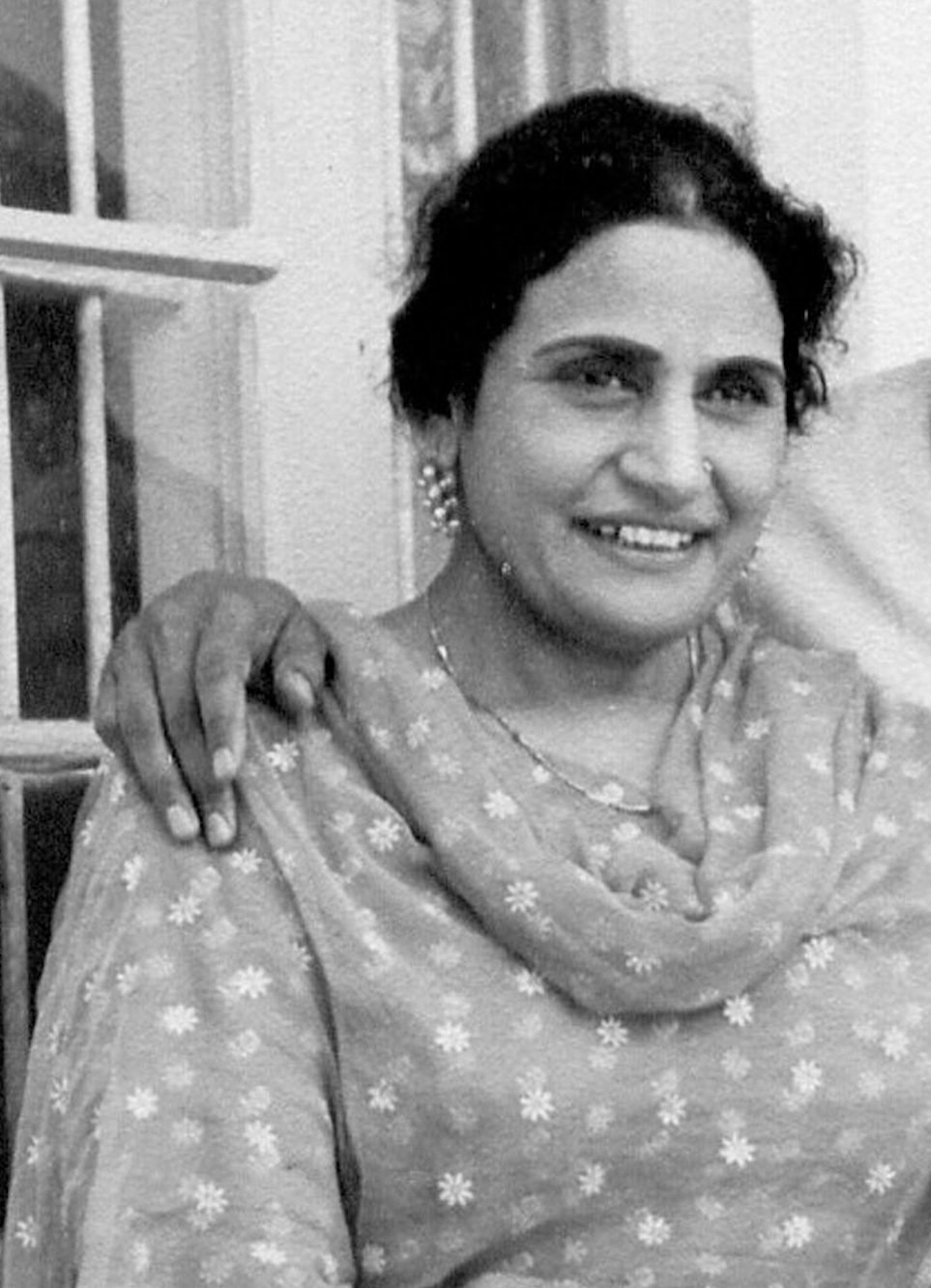

Background information
- Born: Prakash Kaur; 19 September 1919
- Origin: Lahore, British India
- Genres: Folk, Filmi
- Occupations: Singer, Playback singing
- Years active: 1940–1982 (aged 42)

Prakash Kaur (19 September 1919 – 2 November 1982) was an Indian folk singer.

== Early life ==
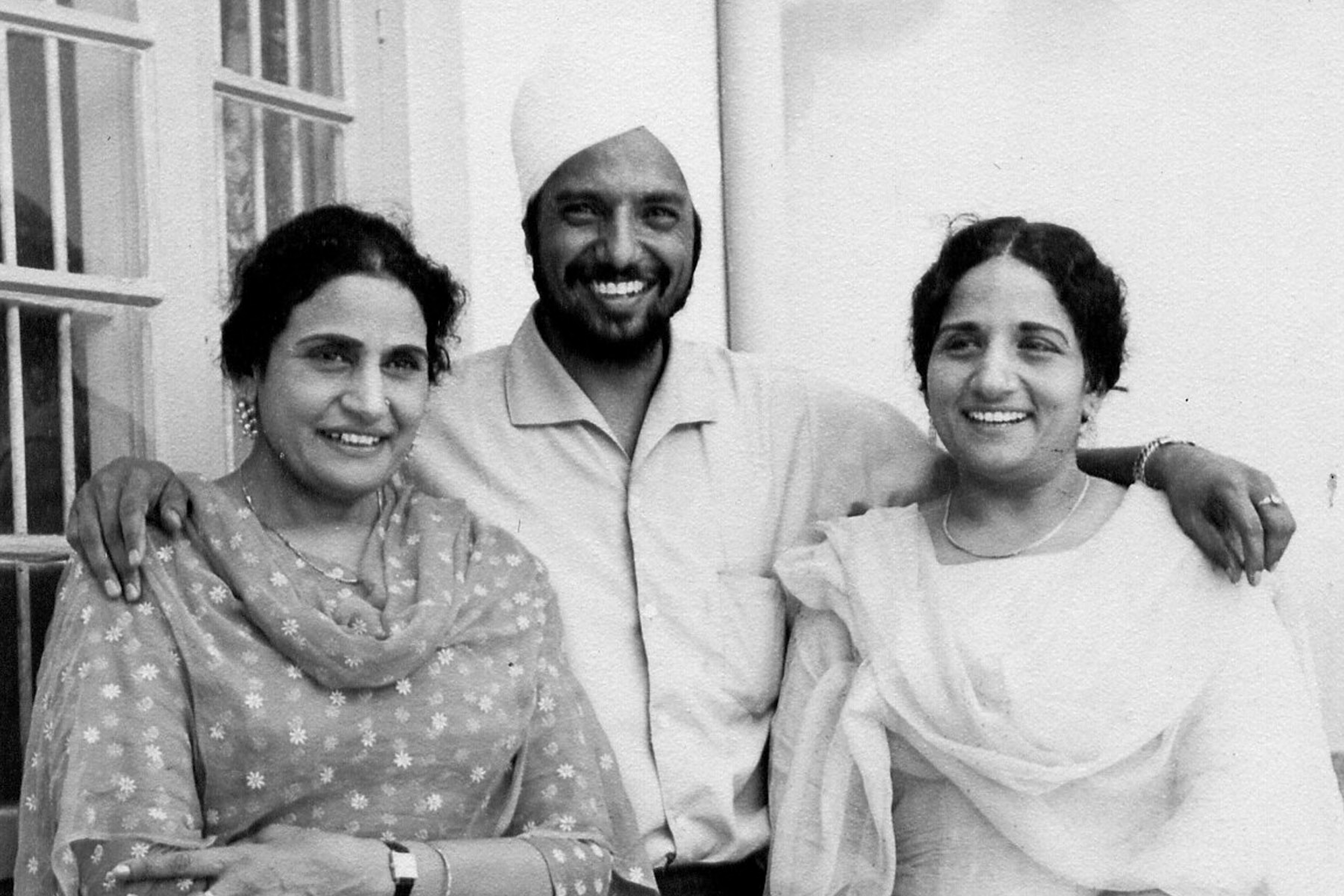
Prakash Kaur, Deedar Singh Pardesi and Surinder Kaur in Nairobi in 1967.

Kaur was born on September 19, 1919 in Lahore, British India, into a Punjabi-Sikh family. She is the elder sister of Surinder Kaur, famous Punjabi singer-songwriter. Kaur was the eldest daughter of a Sehajdhari Sikh Bishan Dass. Her family lived in Mohalla Bhati Gate, within the walled section of Lahore.

In her early life, Kaur drew inspiration from Rababi women, who would sing during weddings and festive occasions.

== Career ==
Kaur was granted approval to sing on Indian radio around 1940. She made her professional debut with a live performance on 'Peshawar Radio' in 1941, and then on 31 August 1943, the two sisters performed their first duet, "maavan 'te dheean ral baithian", for the His Master's Voice label.

Kaur was already an accredited artist of All India Radio Lahore. In 1943, Kaur took her thirteen-year-old sister Surinder Kaur along to the studios of All India Radio Lahore. To the surprise of everyone at the radio station, even Surinder Kaur passed the audition test. After August 1943, Surinder Kaur al Kaur and Surinder Kaur with Deedar Singh Pardesiso started going to the radio station with Kaur and most of the time they sang duets, which became very popular. Budh Singh Taan, who was the assistant to the then head of the music section Jiwan Lal Mattoo at AIR Lahore, started coaching both sisters in light singing. But the road to light singing passed via classical music. This way Kaur got her first exposure to the intricacies of Hindustani classical music.

Both sisters recorded several duets in each other’s company under the music direction of music director Master Inayat Hussain. Even Kaur’s earliest duets with Surinder Kaur became very popular. Some of the earliest recorded duets had the following lyrics “Dhol sipahiya weh kithe gayon dil laake”, “Haaye naa vass oye na wass badla aje naa wass oye kaaliya” and “Maawan te dhiyan ral baithiyan ni maaye koyi kardiyan gallorian, ni Kankan nissriyan dhiyan kyon vissriyan maaye”. All these duets became instant hits. Kaur rendered several “Shabads” also at All India Radio Lahore. These “Shabads” became popular all over the listening area of All India Radio Lahore. During those days transcriptions of the programs were not made. That is why these numbers are not available even in the radio archives. Kaur briefly sang for films too. One or two such records are available with special category collectors.

On 15 August 1947, India gained independence from British Colonial Rule. For most Indians it was an occasion for celebration, but for the Punjabis and the Bengalis it was a time of bloody clashes, arson and devastation. The scale of death and destruction brought about by senseless violence associated with ethnic cleansing exercise was unimaginable anywhere of the world. Since Lahore came into the share of Pakistan, the Hindus and the Sikhs of Lahore had to be forcibly shifted to East Punjab. Kaur and her family members survived the brutalities of the communal frenzy, but they were made to leave Lahore empty handed. Her younger sister Surinder Kaur moved initially to Ferozepore and subsequently to Bombay. Kaur and her husband made the right move. After staying for a short while in Amritsar, Kaur and her family settled in New Delhi. Incidentally Delhi became the city with the highest refugee Punjabi population, and it provided a readymade market for Punjabi music. Kaur had become the best-known Punjabi female singer in Northern India. From day one she was in great demand in metropolitan Delhi and the national capital region. In the adjoining state of Punjab also there was a great demand for Kaur’s music and live performances. She frequently performed live in all the major cities of Punjab, including Amritsar, Jalandhar, Ludhiana, Ferozepore and Ambala. Once or twice a month, she used to perform at All India Radio Jalandhar too.

Kaur’s most popular songs between 1948 and 1952 happened to be “Gori diyan jhanjran bulaondiyan gayeeyan” and “Chan weh ki showkan mele di, pair dho ke jhanjran paondi meldi aondi ki shaonkan mele di”. Some others are “Kithe te laaniyan tahlian ve pattan waaliyan ve mera patla maahi, kithe te laawan shatoot besamajh jeenoo samaj naa aayee” and “Aap mahi ne chug laiyan ni meriyan dukhan kanaan diyan waaliyan”. Initially in Delhi, Kaur sang several duets with Trilok Kapur including “Ghut paani pilade ni sohniye gharha bharendiye naare, jaa hor kite jaa pi weh mundiya khooh wagende saare” and “Boohe te marangi jandre we peke laavan gi dera, we naukraa peke laawangi dera”.

When Surinder Kaur was rubbing shoulders with the elite of play back singers in Bombay, Kaur was training another of her younger sisters Narinder Kaur, who lived in New Delhi. Even Narinder Kaur got approval as a radio singer at All India Radio Delhi. Some of her gramophone records can be traced back to 1950. One was under the music direction of famous music directors Pandit Husan Lal Bhagat Ram. Most of Kaur and Narinder Kaur’s music makers were Pandit Amar Nath, Mujaddid Niazi, Kesar Singh Narula and K. Panna Lal.

In 1952, Surinder Kaur also returned from Bombay to the North and settled in New Delhi. This move reunited the two sisters and revived the memories of the good old days in Lahore. After that Punjabi music witnessed a flood of popular duets by these two singers. They will often sing together for “His Master’s Voice recording company” and All India Radio Delhi. Both sisters were approved as special class radio singers by All India Radio. This category is higher than the “A” class. Some of the most famous religious songs rendered by Kaur and Surinder Kaur included “Chum chum rakho ni eh kalgi jujhar di, phullan naal gundo larhi heeriyan de haar di”, “Kithe maata toriya Ajeet te Jujhar noo and “Maachhiwarhe wich baitha shehanshah jahan daa, hath wich khanda pichhe dhasna Kaman daa”. All the numbers became classics.

The two sisters churned out most popular duets one after the other from 1952 to 1982. Kaur must have recorded something like five hundred records in her entire life span. She was active in music business almost till the time of her death. Prior to her demise for quite some time she was not in good health. Kaur died on November 2, 1982, after a disability caused by a serious accident. Even in her ill health, before death, she was in great demand at All India Radio. During the post Mrs. Indira Gandhi Assassination riots, her house was torched in November 1984. Her son Jaspal Singh Suri escaped the violence and moved to America after 1984.
