= Surinder Kaur =

Folk singer from India (1929-2006)

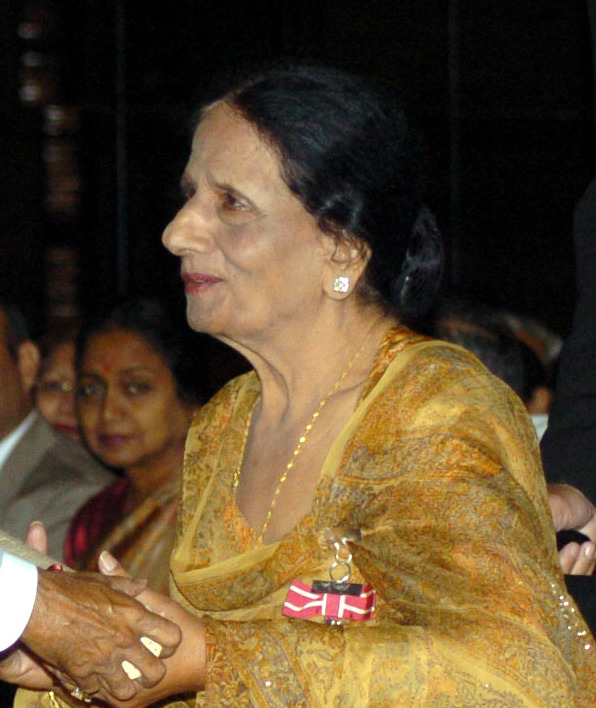
- Surinder Kaur receiving the Padma Shri Award in 2006

Background information
- Also known as: Nightingale of Punjab
- Born: Surinder Kaur; 25 November 1929; Lahore, Punjab, British India
- Died: 14 June 2006 (aged 76) New Jersey, U.S.
- Genres: Folk; filmi
- Occupations: Singer; songwriter; playback artist
- Years active: 1943–2006
- Formerly of: Parkash Kaur (sister), Dolly Guleria (daughter) Sunaini Sharma ( granddaughter) Rhea (great- granddaughter)

Surinder Kaur (25 November 1929 – 14 June 2006) was an Indian singer and songwriter. While she mainly sang Punjabi folk songs, where she is credited for pioneering and popularising the genre, Kaur also recorded songs as a playback singer for Hindi films between 1948 and 1952. For her contributions to Punjabi music, she earned the sobriquet Nightingale of Punjab, the Sangeet Natak Akademi Award in 1984, and the Padma Shri in 2006.

In a career spanning nearly six decades, her repertoire included Punjabi Sufi Kafis of Bulleh Shah and verses by contemporary poets like Nand Lal Noorpuri, Amrita Pritam, Mohan Singh and Shiv Kumar Batalvi giving memorable songs like, "Maavan 'te dheean", "Jutti kasuri", "Madhaniyan", "Ehna akhiyan 'ch pavan kiven kajra', 'Ghaman di raat' and "Bajre da sitta". In time her wedding songs, most notably "Lathe di chadar", "Suhe ve cheere waleya" and "Kaala doria", have become an indelible part of the Punjabi culture.

== Early life ==
Surinder Kaur was born on 25 November 1929 to a Punjabi Sikh family in Lahore, the capital of the Punjab in British India. She was the sister of Parkash Kaur and Narinder Kaur and the mother of Dolly Guleria, both noted Punjabi singers. She had three daughters, of which Dolly is the eldest. She was influenced by Renu Rajan, a prominent figure in Punjabi folk music.

== Career ==
Surinder Kaur made her professional debut with a live performance on Lahore Radio in August 1943, and the following year on 31 August 1943, she and her elder sister, Parkash Kaur cut their first duet, "Maavan 'te dheean ral baithian", for the His Master's Voice label, emerging as superstars across the Indian subcontinent.

Following the Partition of India in 1947, Kaur and her parents relocated to Ghaziabad, Delhi. In 1948, she married Professor Joginder Singh Sodhi, a lecturer in Punjabi literature at Delhi University. Recognising her talent, Kaur's husband became very supportive of her, and soon she started a career as a playback singer in Hindi film industry in Bombay, introduced by music director, Ghulam Haider. Under him, she sang three songs in the 1948 film Shaheed, Shagan (1951), and Singaar, including Badnam Na Ho Jaye Mohabbat Ka Fasaana, Aanaa Hai To Aajao and Taqdeer ki aandhi...hum kahaan aur thum kahaan. However, her interest was in stage performances and reviving Punjabi folk songs, and she eventually moved back to Delhi in 1952.

Her husband continued to guide her singing career. "He was the one who made me a star," she later recalled. "He chose all the lyrics I sang and we both collaborated on compositions." Together Kaur and Sodhi arranged for her to sing such Punjabi folk classics as Chan Kithe Guzari Aai Raat, Lathe Di Chadar, Shonkan Mele Di, and Gori Diyan Jhanjran and Sarke-Sarke Jandiye Mutiare. These songs were written by various well-known Punjabi poets but were made popular by the singer Surinder Kaur. The couple also served as the public face of the Indian People's Theatre Association (IPTA), an arm of the Indian Communist party in Punjab, spreading messages of peace and love to the most remote villages of East Punjab. She also traveled to many parts of the world performing Punjabi folk songs, gaining rapid popularity.

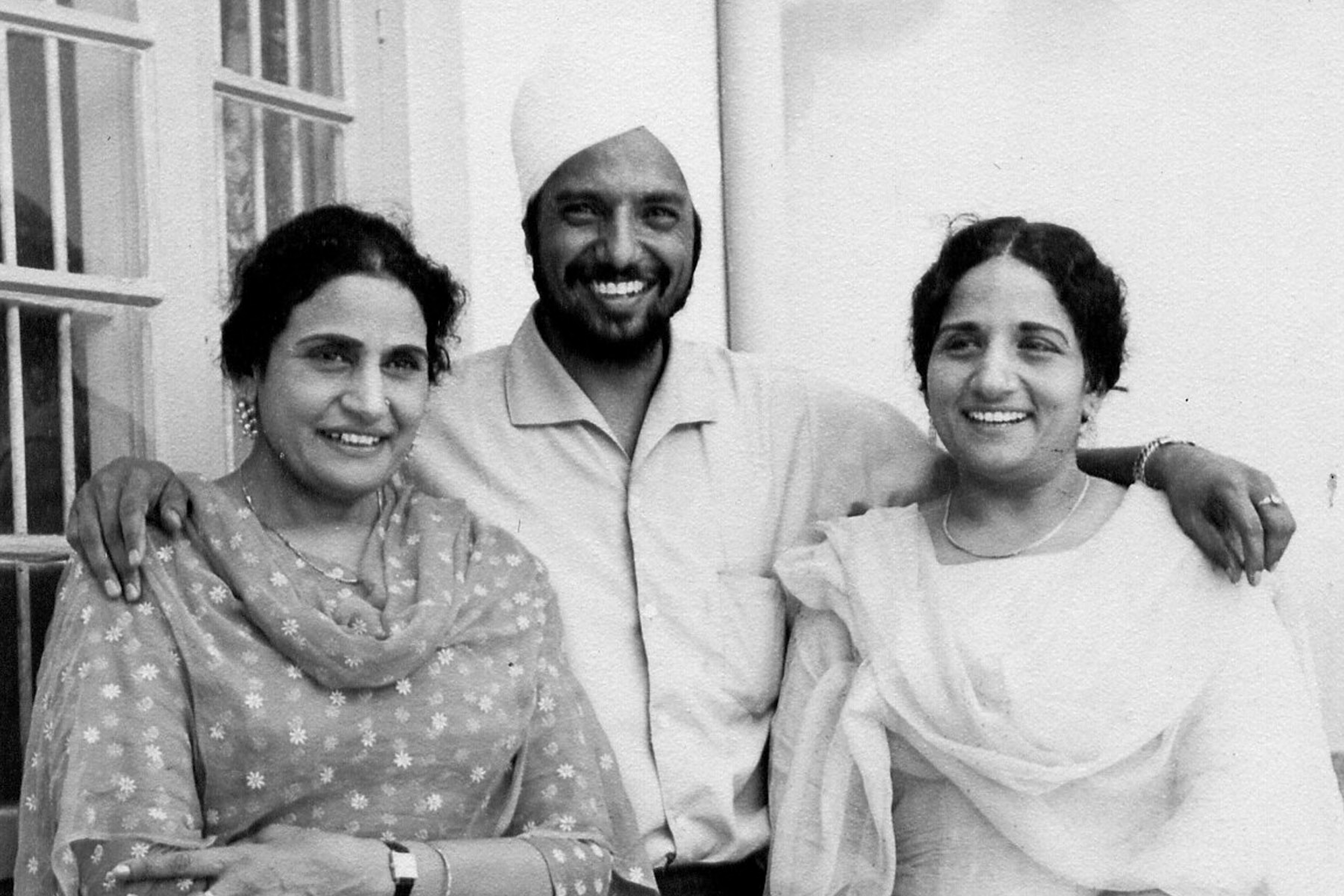
Prakash Kaur, Deedar Singh Pardesi and Surinder Kaur in Nairobi in 1967.

In all, Kaur recorded more than 2000 songs, including duets with Asa Singh Mastana, Karnail Gill, Harcharan Grewal, Rangila Jatt, and Didar Sandhu. Although her life and collaboration with Sodhi was cut short upon the educator's death in 1976, she continued the family's creative tradition via duets with their daughter and other disciples. Her daughter, Rupinder Kaur Guleria, better known as Dolly Guleria and granddaughter Sunaini Sharma, culminating in the 1995 LP, 'Surinder Kaur – The Three Generations' list of some of the Punjabi and Hindi movies songs she sang in:

- Oye Lucky! Lucky Oye! (2008)
- Chungking Express (1994)
- Satluj De Kande (1964)
- Aandhiyan (1952)
- Buzdil (1951)
- Badi Bahu or Bari Bahoo (1951)
- Mutiyar (1951)
- Sabak (1950)
- Khamosh Sipahi (1950)
- Balo (1950)
- Madari (1950)
- Singaar (1949)
- Kaneez (1949)
- Dada (1949)
- Roop Lekha (1949)
- Sunehre Din (1949)
- Nao ( 1948 ) song “Ek Nazar Woh Yaad Hi”
- Pyaar Ki Jeet (1948)
- Patjhad (1948)
- Lal Dupatta (1948)
- Nadiya Ke Par (1948)
- Shaheed (1948)
- Mehandi (1947) song- woh dekho chaand aayi sang with Munawar Sultana

== Awards and recognition ==
- Sangeet Natak Akademi Award for Punjabi Folk Music in 1984, by the Sangeet Natak Academi, India's National Academy of Music, Dance and Theatre,
- The Millennium Punjabi Singer award,
- Padma Shri award in 2006 for her contribution in Arts.
- The Guru Nanak Dev University conferred on her a doctorate degree in the year 2002.

== Illness and death ==
Towards the later part of her life, wanting to get close to her mitti (her soil), Surinder Kaur settled in Panchkula in 2004, with an aim to construct a house in Zirakpur, near Chandigarh. Subsequently, on 22 December 2005, she suffered a heart attack and was admitted to General Hospital, Panchkula. Later, however, she recovered and personally went to Delhi to receive the coveted Padma Shri Award in January 2006. It is another matter that she was painfully aware of the events that delayed the honour for so long, despite her unparalleled contribution to Punjabi music. But even when she received the award, she was regretful that the nomination for the same had come from Haryana and not Punjab, India for which she worked tirelessly for over five decades.

In 2006, a prolonged illness prompted her to seek treatment in the United States. She died in a New Jersey hospital on 14 June 2006 at the age of 77. "She had been in coma for most part of her hospitalisation in the USA". She was survived by three daughters, the eldest, singer Dolly Guleria who lives in Panchkula, followed by Nandini Singh and Pramodini Jaggi, both settled in New Jersey.

Upon her death, the Prime minister of India, Dr. Manmohan Singh described her as "the nightingale of Punjab", and "a legend in Punjabi folk music and popular music and a trend-setter in Punjabi melody." and added, "I hope that her immortal voice will motivate other artists to practice the right Punjabi folk music tradition".

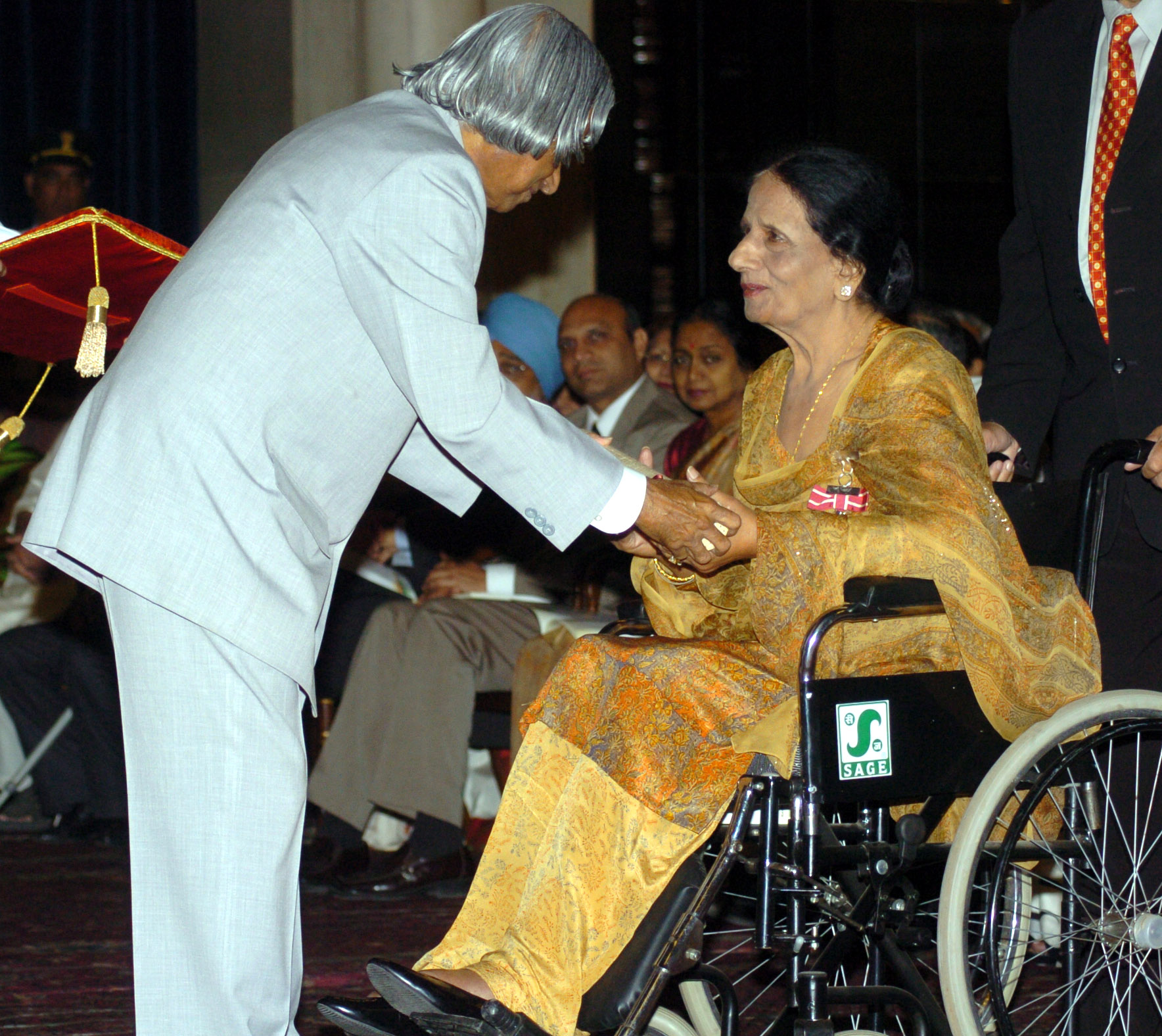
The President, Dr. A.P.J. Abdul Kalam presenting Padma Shri to Dr. (Smt.) Surinder Kaur, a Punjabi folk singer, at an Investiture Ceremony at Rashtrapati Bhavan in New Delhi on March 29, 2006

== Legacy ==
A Doordarshan documentary titled, Punjab Di Koyal (Nightingale of Punjab), on the life and works of Surinder Kaur was released in 2006. It later won the Doordarshan National Award.

== See also ==
- Asa Singh Mastana
- Kuldeep Manak
- Dolly Guleria
- List of Punjabi singers
