= Folk music of Punjab =

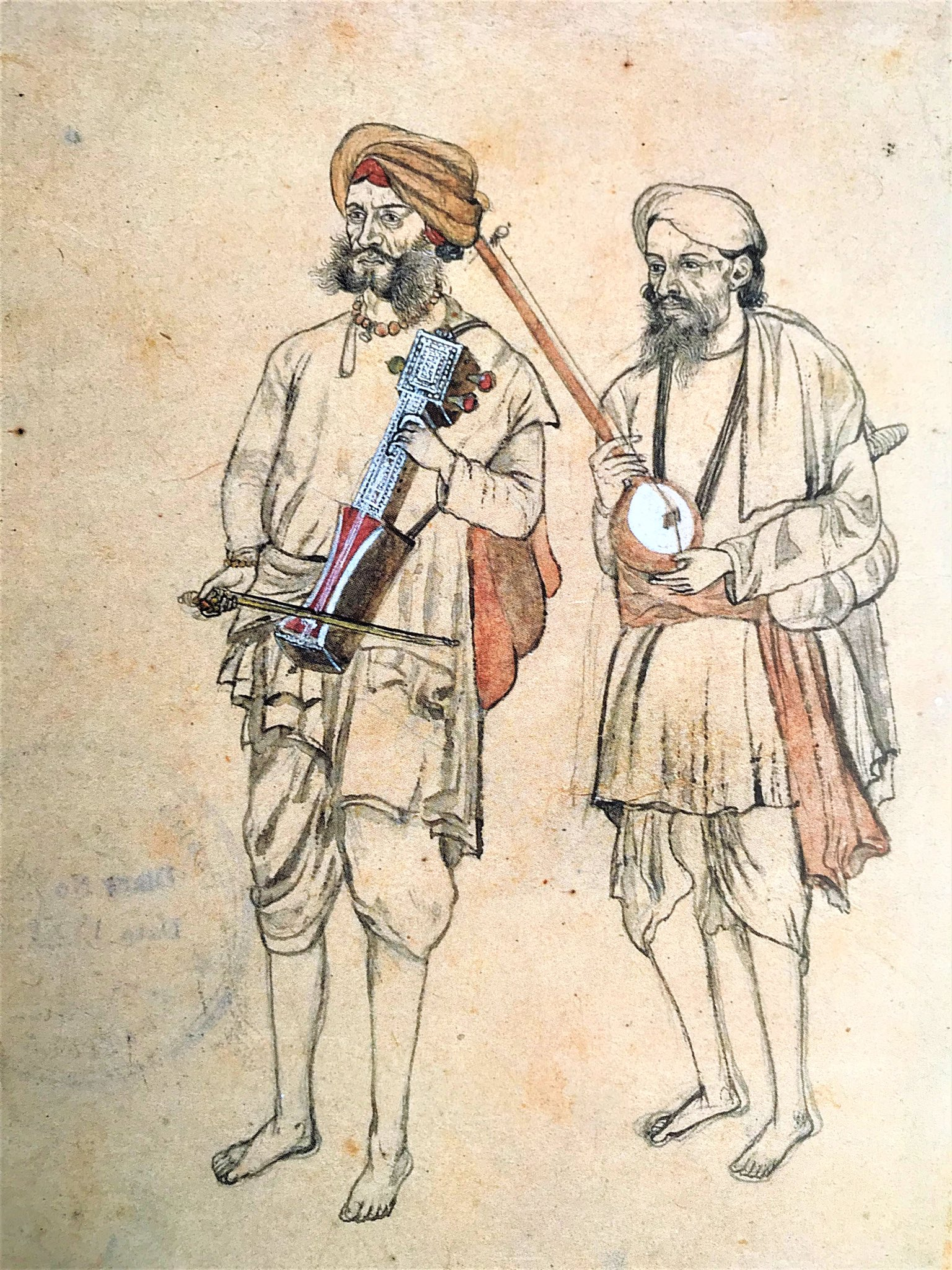
Two wandering jogis from Punjab, ca.1875

Punjabi folk music (Punjabi: پنجابی لوک موسیقی, Punjabi: ਪੰਜਾਬੀ ਲੋਕ ਸੰਗੀਤ or Punjabi Folk) is the traditional music on the traditional musical instruments of the Punjab region of the Indian subcontinent. There is a great repertoire of music from the time of birth through the different stages of joy and sorrow till death. The folk music invokes the traditions as well as the hardworking nature, bravery and many more things that the people of Punjab get from its gateway-to-India geographical location. Due to the large area with many sub-regions, the folk music has minor lingual differences but invokes the same feelings. The sub-regions Bar, Malwa, Doaba, Majha, Pothohar, and hills areas, have numerous folk songs. Punjabi dance OP Bhangra music which is a genre of Punjabi modern music invented in Britain by the Punjabi diaspora.

== General features of musical style ==
=== Rhythm ===
The rhythm of Punjabi folk music is very simple. unlike the rhythms of Bhangra music which are generally complex

=== Melody ===
Some songs like Heer and Mirza are sung using the traditional compositions.

== Folk songs ==
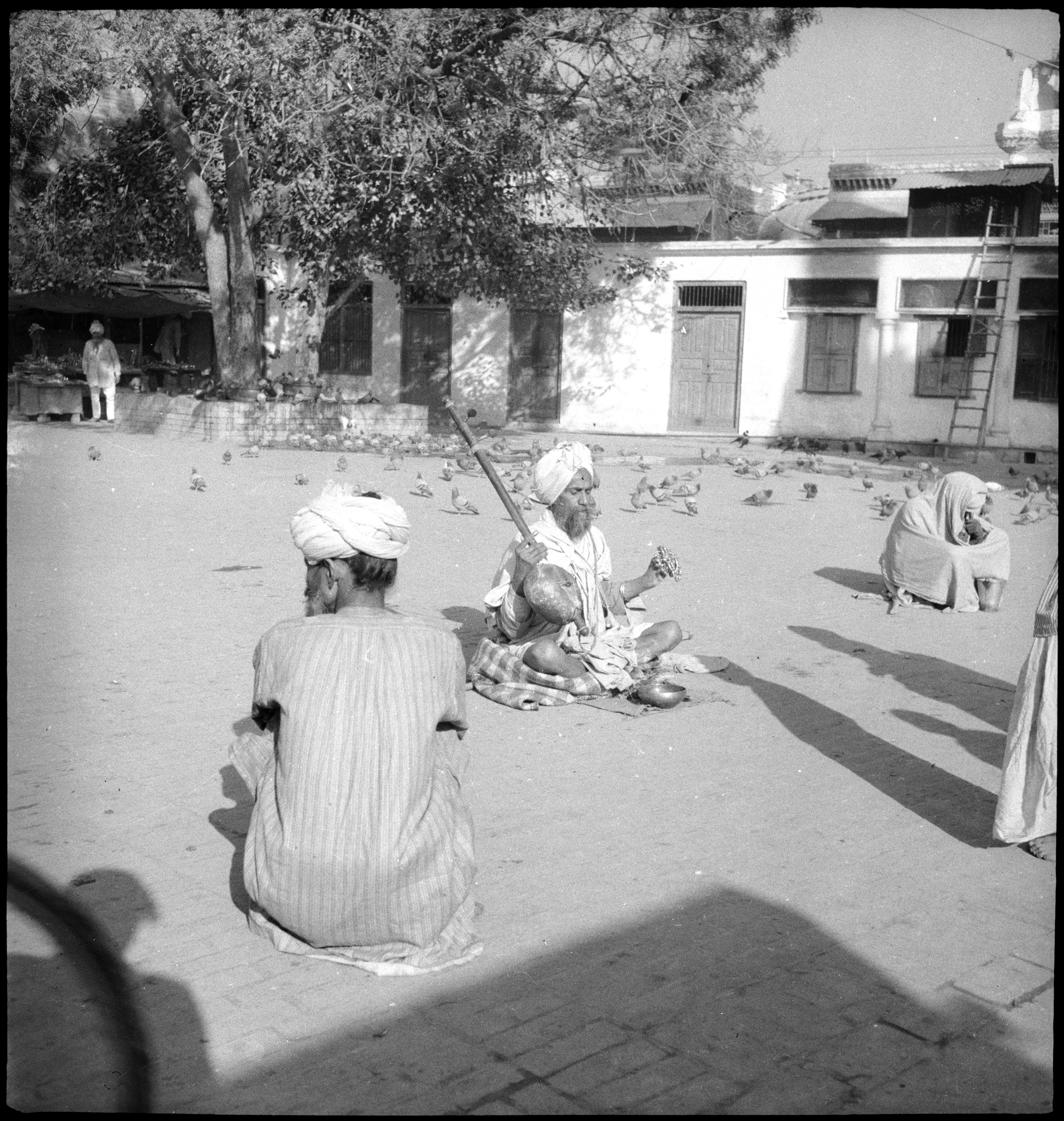
Photograph of a folk-musician performing at a square in Amritsar, taken by Annemarie Schwarzenbach, ca.1939–40

Punjab has folk songs on birth, marriage, funeral, death, love, separation, beauty, social and economical status, village lifestyle, food, nature, bravery, folklores and folktales, folk romances, folk and historical heroes, festivals and many more. The songs of professional castes of Punjab are also included in the folk songs. They can be divided into the following categories:

Paudhi, a Punjabi folk song

=== Occasion for singing ===
==== Controversy ====
Punjabi folk music is associated with a traditional lifestyle and culture. Many of the themes associated with the songs of today, which are mostly relevant in Bhangra songs, involve the promotion of the ills of Punjabi society such as the caste system and substance abuse as well as superstitious beliefs. Many revolutions in Punjab such as the Sikh revolution were in direct opposition of Punjabi folk songs.

==== Life-cycle rituals ====
A large part of Punjabi folk songs presents the picture of incidents from birth to death relations, relatives also including the songs on other occasions, festivals and fairs. The songs by women represents their soft feelings, nature, hobbies and lower social status in limited circle while the songs by men represents their freedom, strength and hardworking. The folk songs starts from the birth of a child then name ceremony, marriage, relations, relatives and much more. There are many songs on the different stages of a marriage like Suhag, Ghorhian, Sehra, Sithnian. Suhag is related to bride while Ghorhian and Sehra are related to groom. A daughter's feelings have a special place in the Punjabi folk songs in which she address to his father asking to find her a better home, good people (in-laws) and many more. By length and mood, the different kinds of songs includes Suhag, Ghorhian, Bolian, Tappe, Sithnian, Chhand, Heara, Lorian, etc.

==== Fairs and festivals ====
Every festive occasion has music associated with it. Lohri and Maghi are associated with the change of season while Vaisakhi is a harvest festival. Men dance Bhangra and women dance Giddha. The month of Sawan is one of great joy for females in which they celebrate the festival of Teeyan. The married ones come back to their parents' home and meet their family and friends and in an open ground they dance Giddha. They wear colorful dresses like Phulkari, and adorn their hands with Mehndi and glass bangles.

=== Types of textual themes ===
==== Romantic ====
Jugni, Mahia, Tappe, Jindua, Dhola, Kafian, Dohre, Bolian, Sadda, Jhokan and the folk romances of Punjab region like Heer Ranjha, Mirza Sahiban, Sohni Mahiwal, Sassi Punnun are main folk love songs. Heer and Mirza are sung using traditional compositions.

==== Heroic ====
In heroic or bravery, the folk song includes about the Punjabi heroes like Dulla Bhatti, Raja Rasalu, Jagga Jatt, S. Bhagat Singh, S. Udham Singh, Sucha Soorma and Jeona Morh.

==== Religious ====
Songs about worship, religious ceremonies and festivals represents the religious feelings.

Sikhism is closely related with music. The sixth Sikh guru, Guru Hargobind, established the singers called Dhadis to sing the Gurbani, Vaars (English: heroic ballads) and other folk genres using the normally two folk instruments, Dhad and Sarangi.

The other religions like Islam have Qawwalis, Naats and Hamds and Hinduism have Bhajans and Punjabi have Punjabi songs.

== Instruments ==
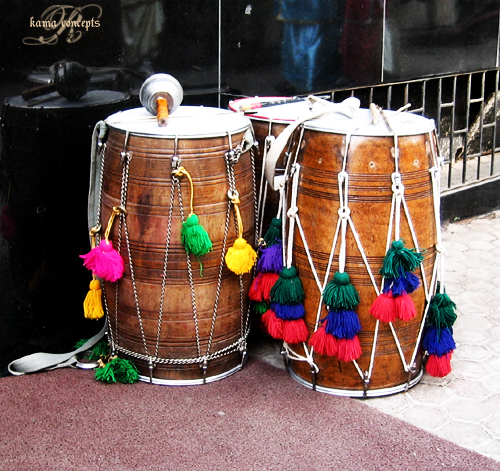
Two dhols

Punjabi singers may sing unaccompanied or along with such traditional instruments as dhol, tumbi, dhadd, sarangi, gharha, gagar, chimta, or algoze, Iktara, Bugchu, Chhaine, Kainchi, Sapp, Kato.

== See also ==
- Punjabi language
- Music of Punjab
- Bhangra (music)
- Folk instruments of Punjab
- Folk dances of Punjab
- Punjabi people
- Punjabi folklore
- Punjabi folk religion
