= List of Punjabi people =

Following is a list of famous and notable Punjabi people, an ethnic group belonging to the Punjab region. It contains people mainly from what is today Punjab, Pakistan and Punjab, India, and people with Punjabi ancestry or people who speak Punjabi as their primary language.

== Artists ==
- Allah Bakhsh
- Amrita Sher-Gil
- Anish Kapoor, sculptor
- Abdur Rahman Chughtai, painter
- Ahmed Parvez, painter
- Bashir Mirza, painter
- Manjit Bawa, painter
- Zubeida Agha, painter
- Rashid Rana, sculptor
- Quddus Mirza, art critic
- Sobha Singh, painter

== Authors ==
=== Punjabi, Hindi and Urdu ===
==== Pakistan ====
- Ali Haider Multani
- Baba Farid
- Shah Hussain
- Sultan Bahu
- Bulleh Shah
- Lutf Ali
- Waris Shah
- Hashim
- Qadir Yar
- Mian Muhammad Baksh
- Khawaja Ghulam Farid
- Ghulam Rasool Alampuri
- Jawayd Anwar
- Mohammad Hameed Shahid
- Zafar Ali Khan
- Muhammad Iqbal
- Hakim Ahmad Shuja
- Hafeez Jalandhari
- Faiz Ahmad Faiz
- Ustad Daman
- Saadat Hasan Manto
- Shareef Kunjahi
- Ahmad Rahi
- Habib Jalib
- Anwar Masood
- Aizaz Ahmad Azar
- Mazhar Tirmazi
- Ali Arshad Mir
- Mir Tanha Yousafi

==== India ====
Giani Gurdit Singh

- Bhai Gurdas
- Amrita Pritam
- Rajinder Singh Bedi
- Bhai Kahn Singh Nabha
- Bhai Vir Singh
- Damodar Das Arora
- Dhani Ram Chatrik
- Ram Sarup Ankhi
- Hira Singh Dard
- Nand Lal Noorpuri
- Chaman Lal Chaman
- Giani Gurdit Singh
- Sampuran Singh Gulzar
- Harbhajan Singh
- Inderjit Hasanpuri
- Jaswant Neki
- J. S. Grewal
- Devendra Satyarthi
- Jaswant Singh Kanwal
- Jaswant Singh Rahi
- Kulwant Singh Virk
- Mehr Lal Soni Zia Fatehabadi
- Nanak Singh
- Navtej Bharati
- Pandit Lekh Ram
- Pash
- Rajkavi Inderjeet Singh Tulsi
- Rajinder Singh Bedi
- Rupinderpal Singh Dhillon
- Sahir Ludhianvi
- Shardha Ram Phillauri
- Shiv Kumar Batalvi
- Surjit Hans

=== English ===
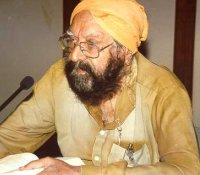
Khushwant Singh (1915-2014) was a prominent Indian novelist and journalist.

- Ahmed Rashid
- Alamgir Hashmi
- Amrita Pritam
- Chetan Bhagat
- Deepak Chopra
- Jaspreet Singh
- Kartar Singh Duggal
- Khushwant Singh
- Manil Suri
- Mohammed Hanif
- Mulk Raj Anand
- Nadeem Aslam
- Neville Tuli
- Partap Sharma
- Rajiv Malhotra
- Romila Thapar
- Susham Bedi
- Tariq Ali
- Ved Mehta
- Vikram Seth
- Yuyutsu Sharma
- Zulfikar Ghose

== Aviators ==
- Kalpana Chawla
- Air Commodore Ravish Malhotra
- Rakesh Sharma, first Indian in space

== Architects ==
- Ahmad Lahori
- Ataullah Rashidi
- Bhai Ram Singh
- Sir Ganga Ram

== Business ==
=== India ===
- Ajay Banga, president and CEO of MasterCard; ex-CEO of Citi Group Asia Pacific
- Aroon Purie, India Today group
- Avtar Lit, founder of Sunrise Radio
- Avtar Saini, microprocessor designer and former vice president of Intel
- Binny Bansal, entrepreneur and co-founder of Flipkart
- Bob Singh Dhillon, Sikh Punjabi Indian-Canadian property businessman
- Brijmohan Lall Munjal, was an Indian entrepreneur and the founder of Hero Group
- Dharampal Gulati, founder of MDH
- F. C. Kohli, regarded as the "father" of the Indian software industry, founder of TCS
- Gulshan Kumar, T Series music label
- Gurbaksh Chahal, entrepreneur who founded several internet advertising companies
- J. C. Mahindra, Mahindra & Mahindra Group
- Jagdish Khattar, managing director of Maruti Udyog ltd 1999 – 2007, civil servant
- Jessie Singh Saini, Indo-American industrialist
- Kanwal Rekhi, one of the first Indian entrepreneurs in Silicon Valley
- Kushal Pal Singh, Chairman and CEO of DLF
- M. S. Banga, ex-CEO of Hindustan Lever; director on the board of Maruti Udyog Limited
- Malvinder Mohan Singh, Fortis Group
- Mohan Singh Oberoi, Oberoi Hotels
- Narinder Singh Kapany, Indian-American physicist known for his work on fiber optics
- Raj Kundra, British–Indian businessman
- Rana Kapoor, founder and managing director of Yes Bank
- Rohit Bansal, entrepreneur and co-founder of Snapdeal
- Sabeer Bhatia, co-founder of Hotmail
- Sanjiv Sidhu, founder and president of i2 Technologies
- Shivon Zilis, venture capitalist
- Sunil Mittal, owner of Bharti Airtel
- Vikram Chatwal, hotelier
- Vinod Dham, father of the Pentium processor
- Vinod Khosla, co-founder of Sun Microsystems
- Vipin Khanna, businessman and financier

=== Pakistan ===
- Anwar Pervez, founder of Bestway
- Ashar Aziz, founder of FireEye in Silicon Valley
- Bashir Tahir, former CEO of Dhabi Group
- Fred Hassan, director at Warburg Pincus
- James Caan, founder of Hamilton Bradshaw
- Malik Riaz, founder of Bahria Town,
- Mansoor Ijaz, founder of Crescent Investment Management Ltd
- Mian Muhammad Latif, founder of Chenab Group
- Mian Muhammad Mansha, founder of Nishat Group
- Michael Chowdrey, founder of Atlas Air
- Shahid Khan, owner of the Jacksonville Jaguars and Fulham F.C., co-owner of All Elite Wrestling
- Zameer Choudrey, CEO of Bestway

== Cartoonists ==
- Shekhar Gurera, editorial cartoonist
- Pran Kumar Sharma, cartoonist of Chacha Chaudhary fame
- Farooq Qaiser

== Doctors ==
=== India ===
- Satya Paul Agarwal
- M. M. S. Ahuja
- Jasbir Singh Bajaj
- Dr Mukesh Batra
- Harpinder Singh Chawla
- Ram Nath Chopra
- Kirpal Singh Chugh
- Harbans Lall Gulati
- Gagandeep Kang
- Ved Prakash Kamboj
- Tarlochan Singh Kler
- Purshotam Lal
- Prithipal Singh Maini
- Ravinder N. Maini
- Jaswant Singh Neki
- Harvinder Sahota
- Baldev Singh
- Daljit Singh
- Khushdeva Singh
- Sahib Singh Sokhey
- Janak Raj Talwar
- K. K. Talwar
- Purshottam Lal Wahi
- Mahinder Watsa
- Khushwant Lal Wig

== Educators and scientists ==
=== Nobel laureates ===
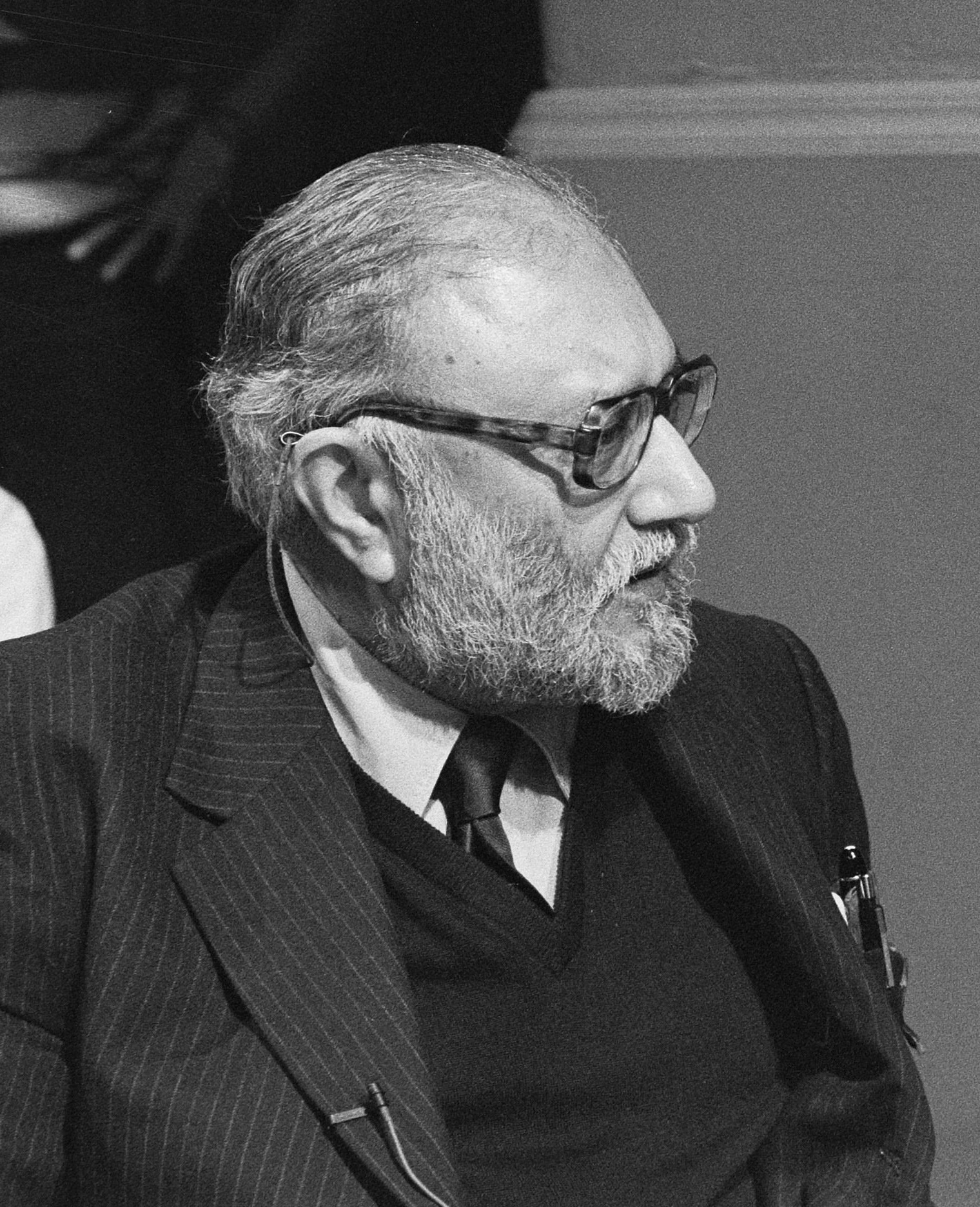
Abdus Salam, first Pakistani Nobel prize winner in Physics

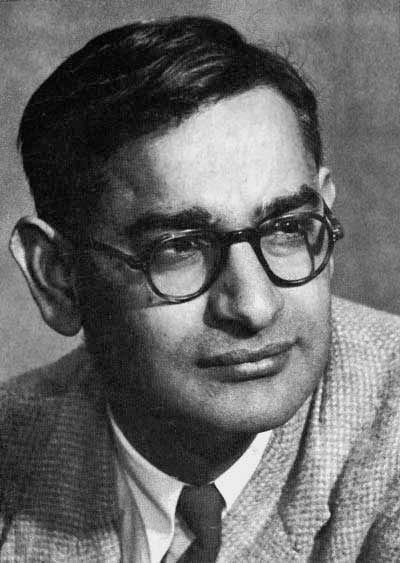
Har Gobind Khorana, first Punjabi Nobel prize winner.

- Abdus Salam, Pakistani theoretical physicist who won the Nobel Prize in Physics for his contributions to the electroweak unification theory
- Har Gobind Khorana, Indian-American Medicine Nobel prize laureate

=== Pakistan ===
- Asad Abidi, professor of electrical engineering at the University of California, Los Angeles (UCLA)
- Masud Ahmed, theoretical physicist and one of the leading figures of the Theoretical Physics Group - the group that developed the theoretical designs of Pakistan's nuclear weapons
- Ishtiaq Ahmed, professor of political science at the Stockholm University
- Nazir Ahmed, experimental physicist and first chairman of the Pakistan Atomic Energy Commission (PAEC)
- Munir Ahmad Khan, Pakistani nuclear scientist and engineer
- Samar Mubarakmand, Pakistani nuclear scientist and the head of the team that conducted the Chagai-I nuclear tests in 1998.
- Farooq Azam, professor of oceanography at the University of California, San Diego
- Tariq Ali, political activist, historian, writer, journalist and public intellectual
- Rafi Muhammad Chaudhry, nuclear physicist and pioneer of Pakistan's nuclear weapons research program
- Nayyar Ali Dada, architect in modernist architecture
- Fayyazuddin, theoretical physicist
- Mahbub ul Haq, economist and inventor of the Human Development Index (HDI)
- Tasawar Hayat, mathematician
- Shahbaz Khan, hydrologist and director of the UNESCO cluster office in Jakarta
- Sultan Bashiruddin Mahmood, nuclear engineer
- Salim Mehmud, rocket scientist
- Atif Mian, professor of economics, public policy and finance at Princeton University
- Zia Mian, physicist and co-director of the program on science and global security at Princeton University
- Ghulam Murtaza, theoretical physicist
- Qaiser Mushtaq, mathematician
- Adil Najam, dean of global studies at Boston University
- Ayyub Ommaya, neurosurgeon and inventor of the Ommaya reservoir
- Khalil Qureshi, physical chemist
- Muneer Ahmad Rashid, mathematical physicist
- Riazuddin, theoretical physicist and one of the leading figures of the Theoretical Physics Group - the group that developed the theoretical designs of Pakistan's nuclear weapons

=== India ===
- M. M. S. Ahuja, Indian physician and endocrinologist
- Om P. Bahl, Indian molecular biologist
- Jasbir Singh Bajaj, Indian physician and diabetologist; conferred with the Padma Vibhushan award
- Hoon Balakram, Indian mathematician
- Indu Banga, historian at Punjab University, Chandigarh
- Lekh Raj Batra, distinguished mycologist and linguist
- Sabeer Bhatia, founder of the Hotmail email service and Jaxtr
- Shanti Swaroop Bhatnagar, first director-general of the Council of Scientific and Industrial Research (CSIR)
- Praveen Chaudhari, Indian American physicist
- Kasturi Lal Chopra, Indian material physicist
- Ram Nath Chopra, Indian medical officer; widely considered the "father of Indian pharmacology"
- Virender Lal Chopra, Indian biotechnologist, geneticist, agriculturalist, former director-general of the Indian Council of Agricultural Research (ICAR)
- Kirpal Singh Chugh, Indian nephrologist
- Manoj Datta, Indian engineer
- Sukh Dev, Indian organic chemist
- Vinod Dham, engineer, entrepreneur and venture capitalist; popularly known as "Pentium Engineer"
- Meena Dhanda, philosopher and academic at University of Wolverhampton
- Satish Dhawan
- Baldev Singh Dhillon
- Vijay K. Dhir, Indo-American scientist
- Guru Prakash Dutta, Indian cell biologist and immunologist
- Khem Singh Gill, Indian academic, geneticist
- Piara Singh Gill, Indian nuclear physicist
- Sucha Singh Gill, Indian academic, economist
- Khem Singh Grewal, Indian pharmacologist
- Ravi Grover, Indian nuclear scientist
- Hansraj Gupta, Indian mathematician
- Sardul Singh Guraya, Indian biologist
- Ranjit Lal Jetley, soldier and scientist
- Gurcharan Singh Kalkat, Indian agricultural scientist
- Ved Prakash Kamboj
- Vijay Kumar Kapahi, Indian astrophysicist
- Narinder Singh Kapany, Indian-born American Sikh physicist
- Satinder Vir Kessar, Indian synthetic organic chemist
- Pradeep Khosla, academic computer scientist
- Vinod Khosla Indian American engineer and businessman
- Rakesh Khurana, Indian-American educator
- Neelam Kler, Indian neonatologist
- Nayanjot Lahiri, Indian historian and archaeologist at Ashoka University
- Purshotam Lal, Indian cardiologist
- Narinder Kumar Mehra, Indian immunologist
- Mridula Mukherjee, Indian historian specialized in modern India Jawaharlal Nehru University
- Manohar Lal Munjal, Indian acoustical engineer
- Yash Pal, Indian scientist, educator and educationist
- Janak Palta McGilligan, Indian Padma Shri recipient, social worker, and a writer of Indian educational curriculum books
- Mohinder Singh Randhawa, Punjabi civil servant, botanist, historian, art and culture promoter, prominent writer
- Narinder Singh Randhawa, Indian agricultural scientist
- Suresh Rattan
- Birbal Sahni, Indian paleobotanist who studied the fossils of the Indian subcontinent
- Daya Ram Sahni, Indian archaeologist
- Harvinder Sahota, Indian American cardiologist
- Hargurdeep (Deep) Saini, Vice President and Principal of the University of Toronto at Mississauga, Ontario, Canada
- Sartaj Sahni, American-Indian computer scientist
- Harvinder Sahota, Indian American cardiologist
- Pritam Saini, English, Punjabi, Hindi and Urdu writer; historian; literary critic
- Sanjay Saini, professor of radiology, Harvard Medical School
- Subhash Saini, senior computer scientist, NASA Ames Research Center, USA
- P. K. Sethi
- Dheeraj Sharma, professor at IIM-Ahmedabad; writer
- Khushdeva Singh, Indian physician and social worker
- Manjit Singh, armament scientist
- Upinder Singh, Indian historian specialized in ancient India at University of Delhi
- Sahib Singh Sokhey, Indian biochemist
- Janak Raj Talwar, Indian cardiothoracic scientist
- B. K. Thapar, Indian archaeologist; Director-general of the Archaeological Survey of India, 1978–1981
- Kartar Singh Thind
- Surinder Vasal, Indian geneticist scientist
- Purshottam Lal Wahi
- Khushwant Lal Wig, Indian physician
- Bagicha Singh Minhas, Indian economist

== Folklore ==
- Heer Ranjha
- Mirza Sahiba
- Puran Bhagat
- Sayful Muluk
- Sohni Mahiwal
- Boysie Singh

== Film industry ==
=== Bollywood (India) ===
The following is a list of famous Punjabi families and individual artistes who have worked in Bollywood:

Family	Artistes
The Sahnis	Balraj Sahni, Bhisham Sahni, Parikshit Sahni
The Anands	Chetan Anand, Dev Anand, Vijay Anand
The Chopras - 1	Baldev Raj Chopra, Yash Chopra, Ravi Chopra, Aditya Chopra, Uday Chopra
The Chopras - 2	Priyanka Chopra, Parineeti Chopra
The Deols	Dharmendra, Sunny Deol, Bobby Deol, Esha Deol, Abhay Deol
The Bachchans	Teji Bachchan, Amitabh Bachchan, Abhishek Bachchan, Shweta Bachchan Nanda
The Malhotras	Prem Nath, Rajendra Nath, Bina Rai, Prem Kishen
The Roshans	Rakesh Roshan, Rajesh Roshan, Hrithik Roshan
The Randhawas	Dara Singh, Vindu Dara Singh, Randhawa, Shaad Randhawa
The Rajs	Jagdish Raj, Anita Raj
The Puris	Chaman Puri, Madan Puri, Amrish Puri, Vardhan Puri
The Khannas - 1	Rajesh Khanna, Twinkle Khanna, Rinke Khanna
The Khannas - 2	Vinod Khanna, Akshaye Khanna, Rahul Khanna
The Bedis - 1	Kabir Bedi, Pooja Bedi
The Bedis - 2	Narendra Bedi, Rajat Bedi, Manik Bedi
The Kapurs	Pankaj Kapur, Shahid Kapoor
The Kapoors - 1	Prithviraj Kapoor, Trilok Kapoor, Raj Kapoor, Kareena Kapoor, Ranbir Kapoor, Rishi Kapoor, Shashi Kapoor, Shammi Kapoor, Randhir Kapoor, Karishma Kapoor, Rajiv Kapoor, Karan Kapoor
The Kapoors - 2	Anil Kapoor, Boney Kapoor, Sanjay Kapoor, Arjun Kapoor, Sonam Kapoor
The Kapoors - 3	Jeetendra, Tusshar Kapoor, Ekta Kapoor
The Ahujas	Arun Kumar Ahuja, Nirmala Devi, Govinda Ahuja, Sunita Ahuja, Tina Ahuja, Krushna Abhishek, Ragini Khanna, Vinay Anand, Arti Sharma, Saumya Seth
The Dhawans	David Dhawan, Varun Dhawan, Rohit Dhawan, Anil Dhawan
The Devgans	Veeru Devgan, Ajay Devgan, Anil Devgan
The Oberois	Suresh Oberoi, Vivek Oberoi
The Aroras	Malaika Arora Khan, Amrita Arora
The Tulis	Rajendra Kumar, Kumar Gaurav
The Dutts	Nargis Dutt, Sunil Dutt, Sanjay Dutt
The Mehras	Vinod Mehra, Soniya Mehra, Rohan Mehra
The Babbars	Raj Babbar, Arya Babbar, Prateik Babbar, Juhi Babbar
The Goswamis	Manoj Kumar, Kunal Goswami
The Behls	Ramesh Behl,Goldie Behl, Ravi Behl

==== Individual Actors ====
- Achala Sachdev
- Aditya Roy Kapur
- Aditya Seal
- Akshay Dogra
- Akshay Kumar
- Akanksha Juneja
- Amrinder Gill
- Amrita Singh
- Ammy Virk
- Aneet Padda
- Annu Kapoor
- Arjan Bajwa
- Arjun Rampal
- Armaan Kohli
- Arshad Warsi
- Arun Bakshi
- Arya Babbar
- Avtar Gill
- Aryan Vaid
- Ayushman Khurana
- Babbal Rai
- Bhumika Chawla
- Bina Rai
- Binnu Dhillon
- Celina Jaitley
- Chandan Prabhakar
- Diljit Dosanjh
- Dilip Kumar
- Deepak Parashar
- Geeta Bali
- Geeta Basra
- Gippy Grewal
- Gracy Singh
- Gul Panag
- Gulshan Grover
- Gurdas Maan
- Gurpreet Ghuggi
- Gurshabad Singh
- Hard Kaur
- Harman Baweja
- Harry Ahluwalia
- Hasleen Kaur
- Iftekhar
- Jassi Gill
- Jaspal Bhatti
- Jimmy Shergill
- Juhi Chawla
- Jyothika
- Kajal Aggarwal
- Kanwaljit Singh
- Kapil Sharma
- Karan Johar
- Karan Singh Grover
- Karan Wahi
- Kidar Nath Sharma
- Kiran Juneja
- Kirron Kher
- Kriti Kharbanda
- Kriti Sanon
- Kulraj Randhawa
- Kulbhushan Kharbanda
- Kunal Kapoor
- Lakha Lakhwinder Singh
- Mahek Chahal
- Mahie Gill
- Mandira Bedi
- Mangal Dhillon
- Maniesh Paul
- Manjot Singh
- Manoj Pahwa
- Mehar Mittal
- Minissha Lamba
- Mink Brar
- Mona Singh
- Monica Bedi
- Mukesh Khanna
- Mukesh Rishi
- Mukul Dev
- Navin Nischol
- Neeru Bajwa
- Neetu Singh
- Neha Dhupia
- Nikitin Dheer
- Nimrat Kaur
- Om Prakash
- Om Puri
- Pankaj Dheer
- Parmeet Sethi
- Pavan Malhotra
- Pinchoo Kapoor
- Poonam Dhillon
- Pramod Moutho
- Pran
- Prateik Babbar
- Praveen Kumar
- Prem Chopra
- Priya Gill
- Pulkit Samrat
- Puneet Issar
- Rahul Dev
- Raj Babbar
- Rajat Kapoor
- Rajit Kapur
- Rakesh Bedi
- Rakul Preet Singh
- Randhir
- Ranjeet
- Ranvir Shorey
- Rana Ranbir
- Ram Kapoor
- Raveena Tandon
- Rati Agnihotri
- Ridhi Dogra
- Ruby Bhatia
- Saeed Jaffrey
- Sahil Anand
- Sanya Malhotra
- Sargun Mehta
- Saumya Tandon
- Saurabh Sachdeva
- Shakti Kapoor
- Sheeba Chaddha
- Shiny Ahuja
- Shoma Anand
- Sidharth Malhotra
- Simi Garewal
- Simone Singh
- Simran Bagga
- Simrat Kaur
- Smriti Irani
- Sonu Sood
- Sudesh Berry
- Sunil Grover
- Sunny Leone
- Sunny Singh (actor)
- Suraiya
- Surbhi Jyoti
- Taapsee Pannu
- Tinnu Anand
- Urvashi Sharma
- Vaani Kapoor
- Varun Sharma
- Veena (actress)
- Vicky Kaushal
- Vidyut Jamwal
- Vikas Bhalla
- Vijay Arora
- Vinod Mehra
- Vishal Malhotra
- Vivek Shauq
- Yami Gautam
- Yash Johar
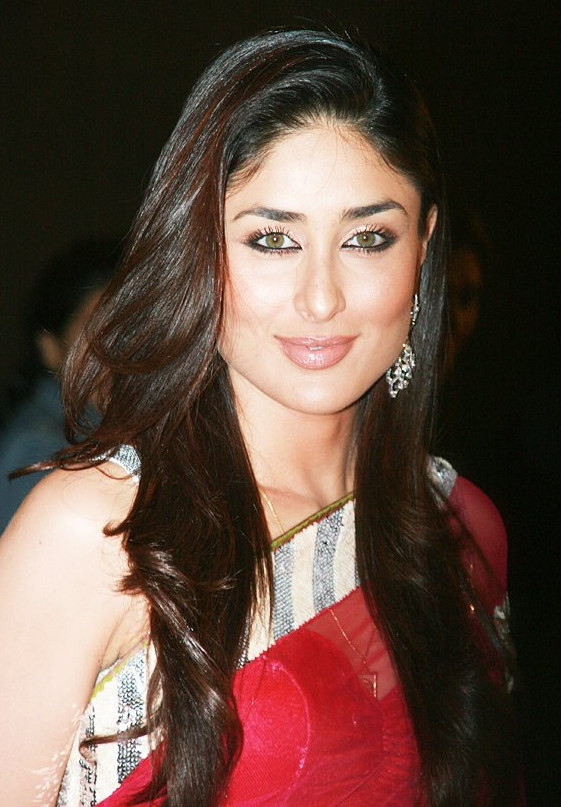
Kareena Kapoor Khan, Indian film actress

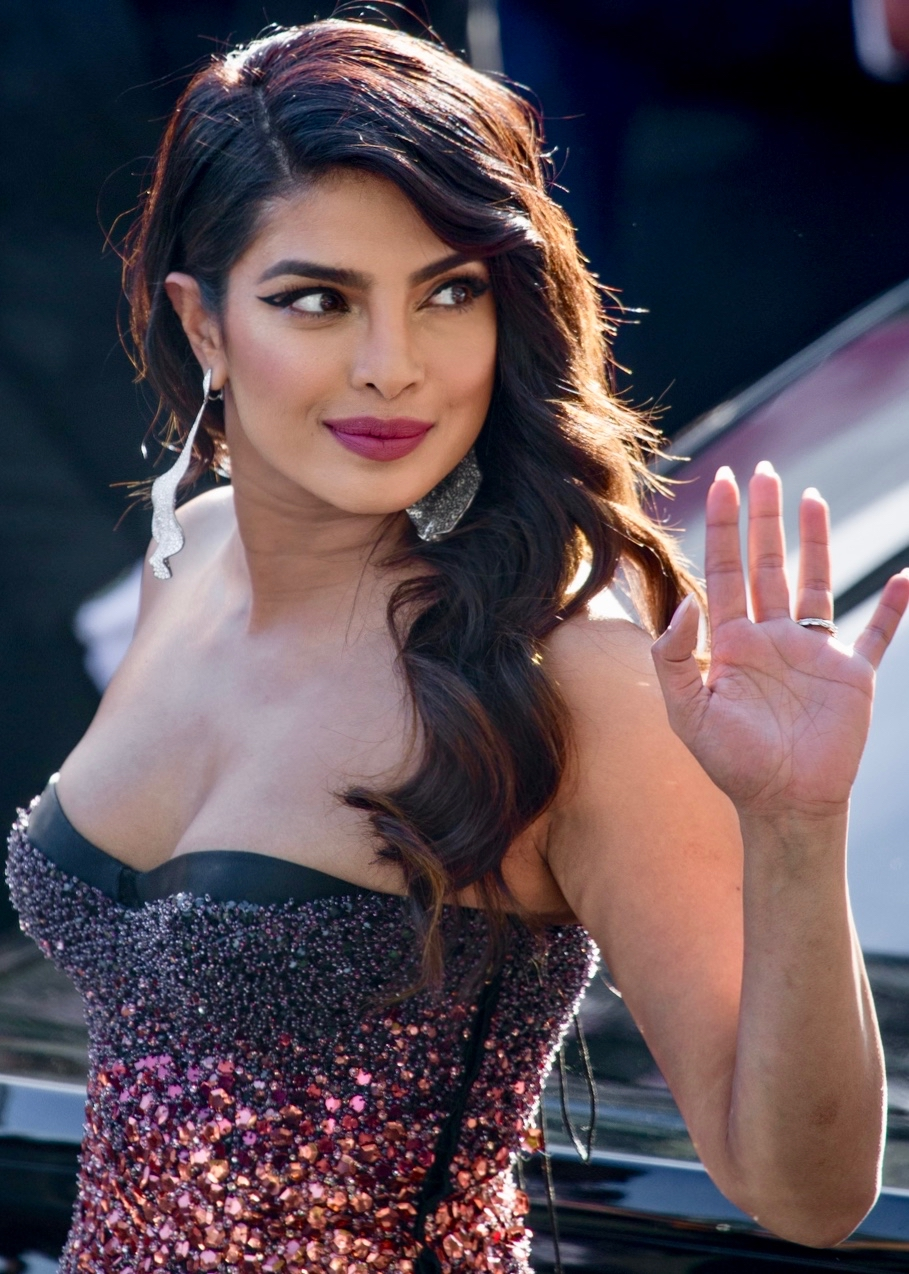
Priyanka Chopra, Miss World 2000, Indian and American film actress

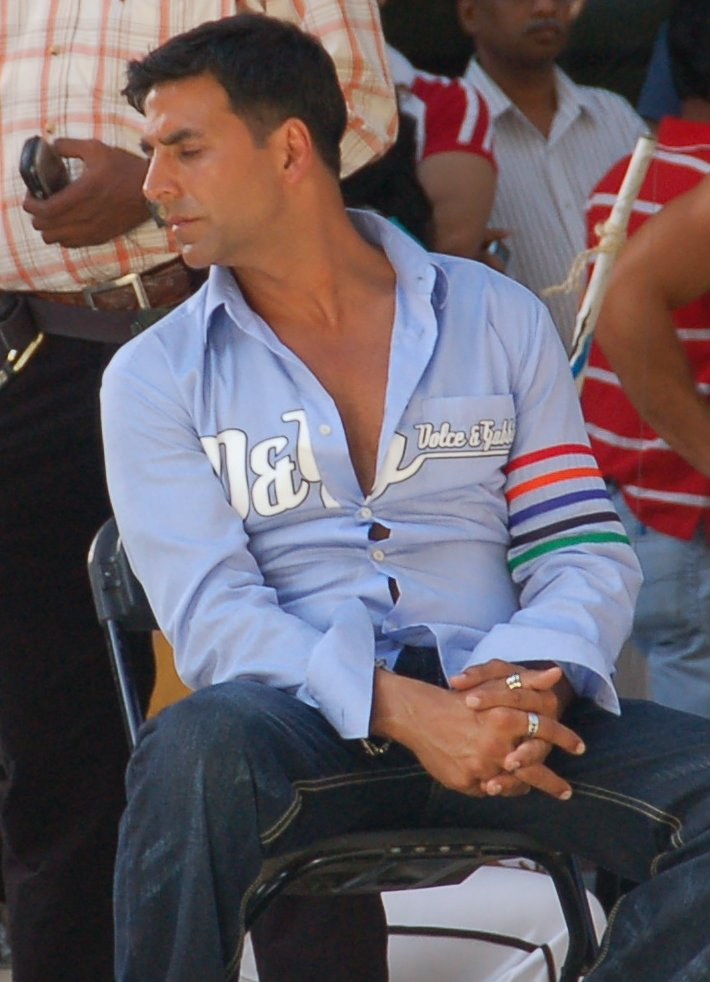
Akshay Kumar, Indian film actor

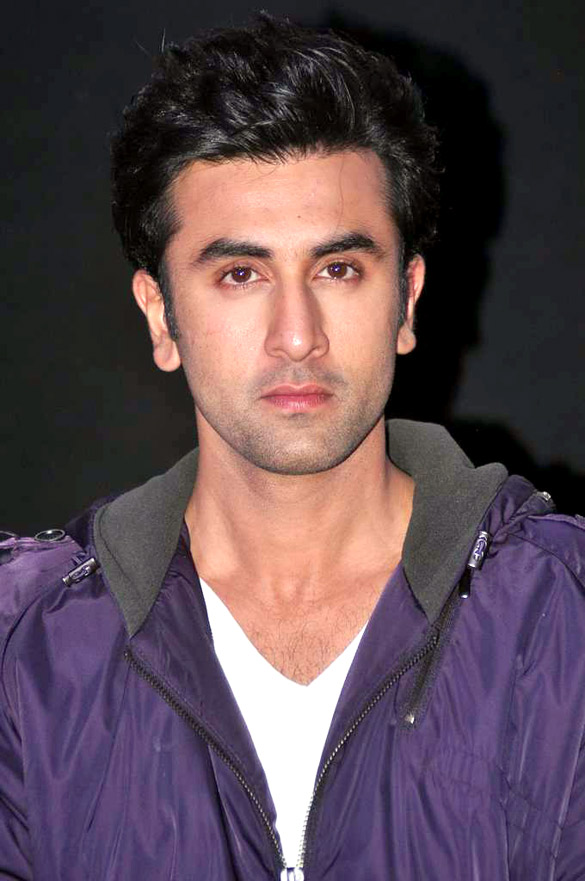
Ranbir Kapoor, Indian film actor

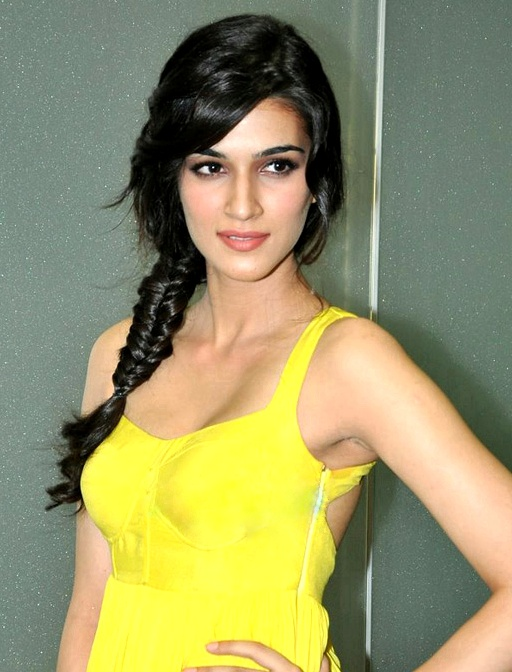
Kriti Sanon,Indian film actress and National Film Award winner

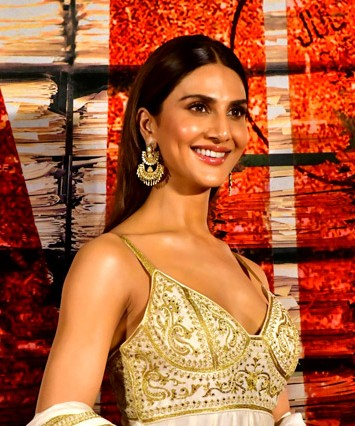
Vaani Kapoor,Indian actress

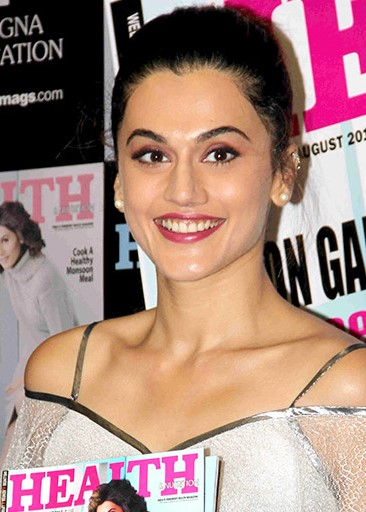
Taapsee Pannu,Indian actress

==== Directors ====
- Abdur Rashid Kardar
- Abhishek Kapoor
- Aditya Chopra
- Anil Sharma
- Anurag Singh
- Ashim Ahluwalia
- B. R. Chopra
- Brij Sadanah
- Chetan Anand
- David Dhawan
- Deepa Mehta
- Deepak Balraj Vij
- Deepak Sareen
- Dharmesh Darshan
- Goldie Behl
- Guddu Dhanoa
- Gulzar
- Harry Baweja
- Inder Raj Anand
- J.P.Dutta
- Kamal Sadanah
- Karan Johar
- Karan Malhotra
- Kunal Kohli
- Lekh Tandon
- Loveleen Tandan
- Mira Nair
- Mohan Kumar
- Mohit Suri
- Mukul Anand
- Pankaj Parashar
- Prakash Mehra
- Punit Malhotra
- Raj Kanwar
- Raj Khosla
- Rajiv Rai
- Rajkumar Kohli
- Rakeysh Omprakash Mehra
- Ramanand Sagar
- Ravi Chopra
- Ravi Tandon
- Ritesh Batra
- Shakun Batra
- Shekhar Kapur
- Siddharth Anand
- Subhash Ghai
- Suneel Darshan
- Tinnu Anand
- Umesh Mehra
- Vidhu Vinod Chopra
- Vijay Anand
- Vikas Bahl
- Vipin Handa
- Yash Chopra

==== Documentary filmmakers ====
- Mukesh Gautam

=== Lollywood (Pakistan) ===
- Aamina Sheikh
- Aasia Begum
- Adeel Chaudhry
- Adnan Shah
- Ahmed Ali Akbar
- Ahsan Khan
- Akmal
- Albela
- Ali Ejaz
- Ali Kazmi
- Ali Zafar
- Armeena Khan
- Asad Malik
- Aslam Pervaiz
- Babar Ali
- Babra Sharif
- Bahar Begum
- Bilal Ashraf
- Bushra Ansari
- Firdous Begum
- Gohar Rasheed
- Hania Aamir
- Habib-ur-Rehman
- Hamid Rana
- Hamza Ali Abbasi
- Humayun Saeed
- Iftikhar Thakur
- Inayat Hussain Bhatti
- Irfan Khoosat
- Javed Sheikh
- Jia Ali
- Kifayat Hussain Bhatti
- Masood Akhtar
- Meera
- Mikaal Zulfiqar
- Moammar Rana
- Mohsin Abbas Haider
- Munawar Zarif
- Naghma
- Najma Mehboob
- Nargis
- Nayyar Ejaz
- Neelo
- Nirma
- Rafi Khawar
- Rani
- Resham
- Sabiha Khanum
- Sahiba Afzal
- Sajjad Kishwar
- Saleem Sheikh
- Salma Mumtaz
- Salman Shahid
- Shaan Shahid
- Shafqat Cheema
- Shahid Hameed
- Shahida Mini
- Sultan Rahi
- Swaran Lata
- Tariq Aziz
- Usman Peerzada
- Waheed Murad
- Yasir Hussain
- Yousuf Khan
- Zara Sheikh
- Zeba
Ali Zafar,Pakistani singer-songwriter and actor

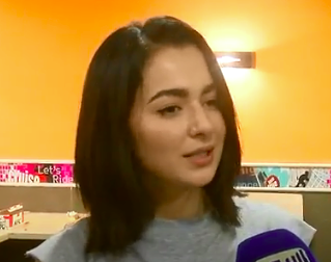
Hania Aamir,Pakistani film actress

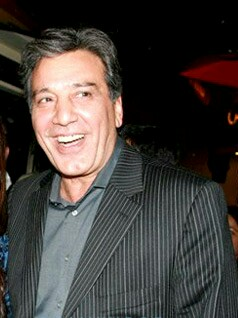
Jawed Sheikh,Pakistani film actor,director and producer

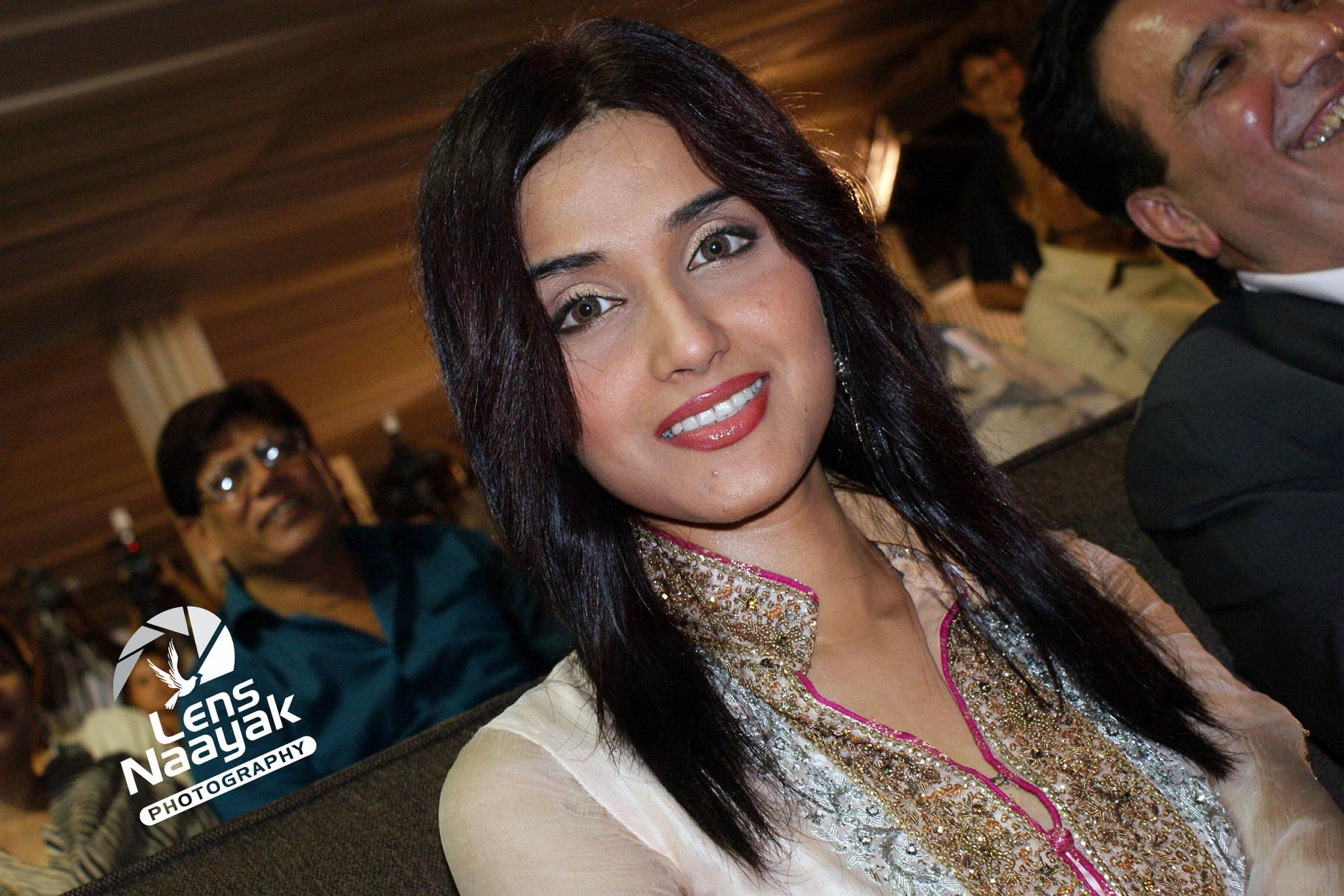
Zara Sheikh,Pakistani model and actress

==== Directors ====
- Anwar Kamal Pasha
- Hassan Tariq
- Javed Raza
- M. Akram
- Masood Parvez
- Pervaiz Kaleem
- Riaz Shahid
- Sarmad Khoosat
- Syed Noor

=== Punjabi cinema (India) ===
==== Directors ====
- Amberdeep Singh
- Amitoj Maan
- Anurag Singh
- Baljit Singh Deo
- Gippy Grewal
- Harry Baweja
- Jagdeep Sidhu
- Manmord Sidhu
- Mukesh Gautam
- Pankaj Batra
- Rohit Jugraj Chauhan
- Simerjit Singh
- Smeep Kang

==== Actors ====
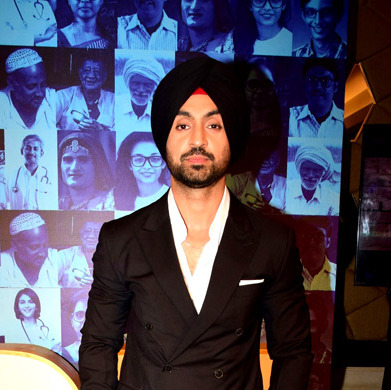
Diljit Dosanjh, star of Jatt & Juliet and Punjab 1984

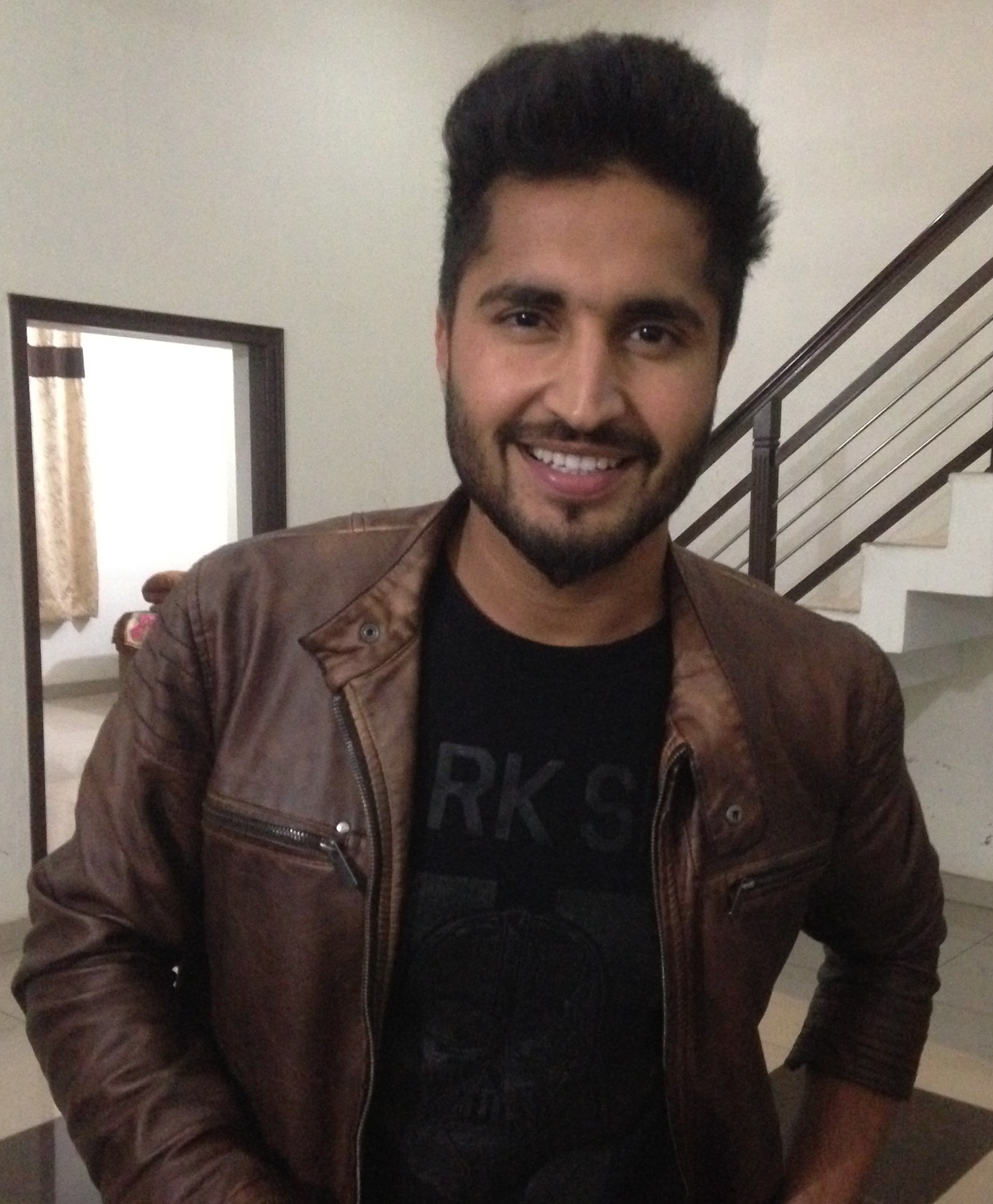
Jassi Gill, star of Mr & Mrs 420 and Sargi

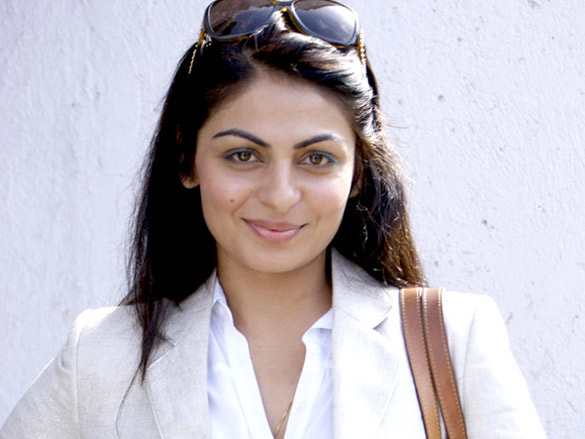
Neeru Bajwa, star of Jatt & Juliet 2 and Jihne Mera Dil Luteya

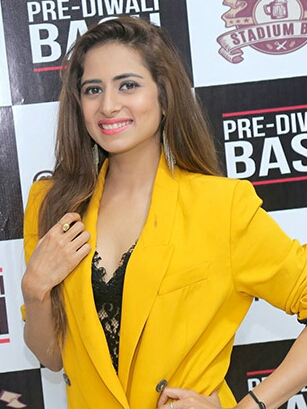
Sargun Mehta, star of Angrej and Lahoriye

The Punjabi film industry has produced a number of successful actors, actresses, writers, directors and filmmakers, many of whom have been known internationally.

Actors

Actresses

=== Tamil cinema (India) ===
- Simran Bagga, Punjabi Hindu
- Jyothika, Punjabi Hindu
- Kajal Agarwal, Punjabi Hindu
- Sonia Aggarwal, Punjabi Hindu

=== International Film and TV personalities ===
- Lilly Singh
- Purva Bedi
- Waris Ahluwalia
- Tarsem Singh
- Monica Dogra
- Param Gill

== Historical ==
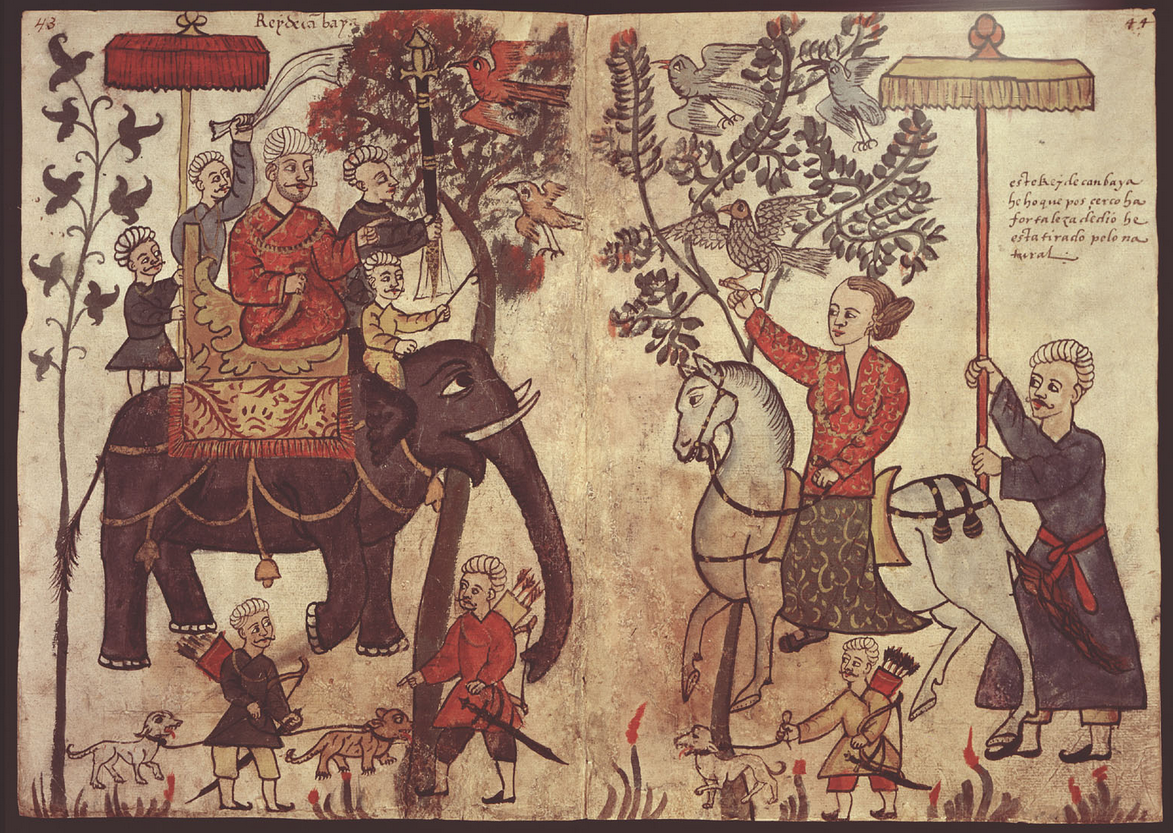
Sultan of Gujarat, a descendant of Muzaffar Shah I

=== Ancient ===
- Porus
- Sudas
- Vasishtha
- Vishvamitra
- Pushkarasarin
- Chanakya
- Panini
- Taxiles
- Khema

=== Medieval ===
- Jayapala
- Ayn al-Mulk Multani
- Khizr Khan
- Zafar Khan
- Shaikha Khokhar
- Jasrath Khokhar
- Rai Sahra Langah
- Sultan Husseyn Langah I

Post Medieval Era

Muslims

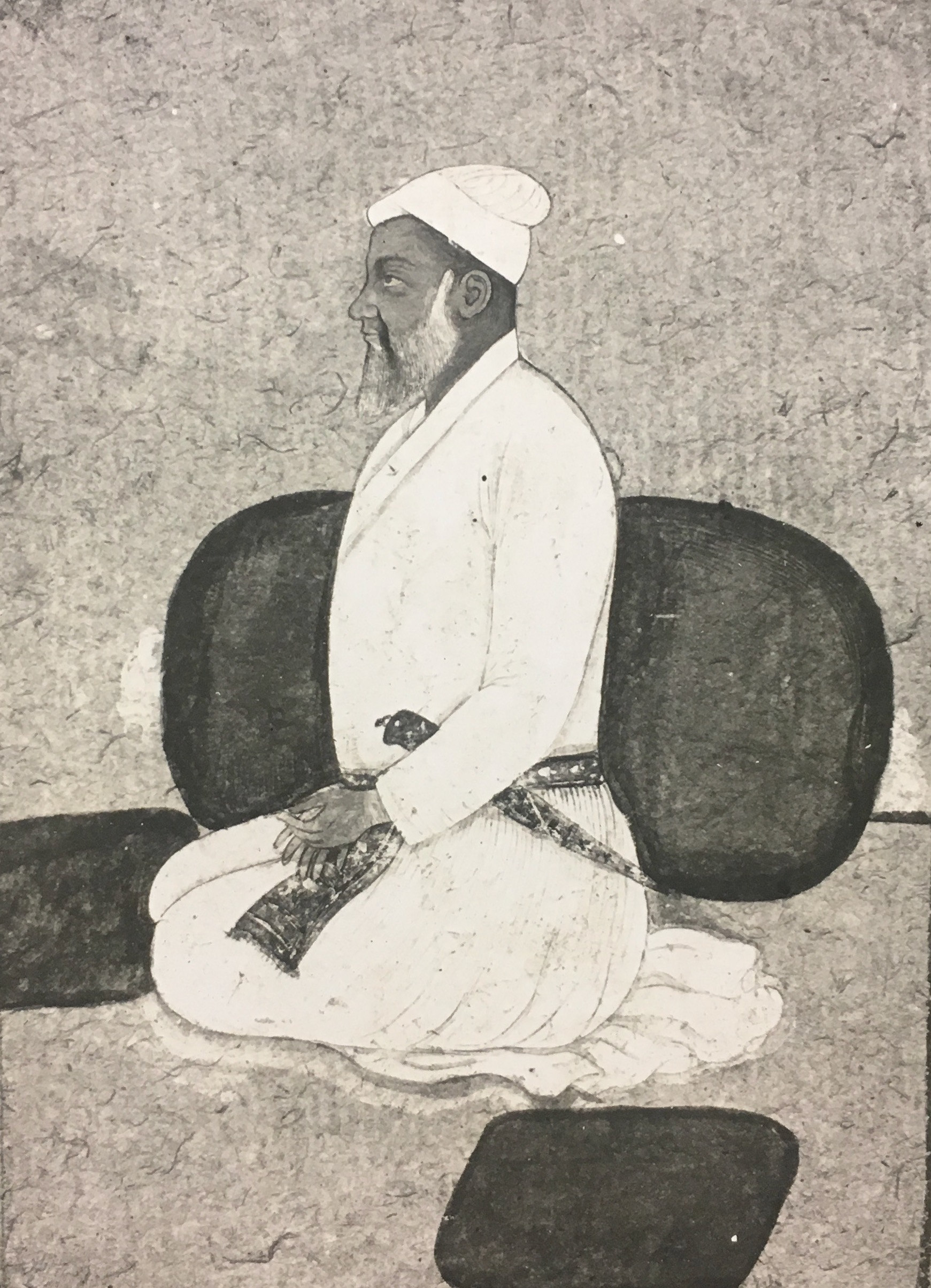
Adina Beg, last Muslim governor of Punjab

- Sarang Khan Ghakkar
- Shaikh Gadai Kamboh, Chief Justice of Mughal Empire
- Shahbaz Khan Kamboh, Governor of Bengal
- Wazir Khan, Grand Vizier of Mughal Empire
- Saadullah Khan, Grand Vizier of Mughal Empire
- Hifzullah Khan, Governor of Sindh and Kashmir
- Adina Beg Arain, Governor of Lahore and Multan
- Muzaffar Jang Hidayat, 3rd Nizam of Hyderabad
- Nur Muhammad Chattha
- Pir Muhammad Chattha
- Ghulam Muhammad Chattha
- Fath Muhammad
- Hyder Ali
- Tipu Sultan

=== Sikh Empire ===
Sikh

- Hari Singh Nalwa
- Hari Singh Dhillon
- Chattar Singh Attariwalla
- Sham Singh Atariwala
- Jodh Singh Ramgarhia
- Jawahar Singh Aulakh
- Tej Singh
- Sher Singh Attariwalla
- Ranjodh Singh Majithia
- Mangal Singh Ramgarhia
- Sangat Singh Saini
- Nanu Singh Saini

==== Hindu ====
- Dewan Mokham Chand
- Misr Diwan Chand
- Gulab Singh
- Mahan Singh Mirpuri
- Ranbir Singh
- Dhian Singh
- Dewan Sawan Mal Chopra
- Zorawar Singh Kahluria
- Diwan Mulraj Chopra
- Sukh Jiwan Mal

==== Muslim ====
- Shaikh Ghulam Muhy-ud-Din (died 1846), governor of Kashmir
- Shaikh Imam-ud-Din (1819–1859), governor of Kashmir
- Mian Ghousa (died 1814), artillery officer
- Fakir Azizuddin (1780–1845), diplomat and physician
- Fateh Khan Tiwana (died 1848), Tiwana chief
- Ilahi Bakhsh (died 1849), artillery officer
- Sultan Mahmud Khan (died 1859), artillery officer

== Monarchs ==
=== Muzzafarid Sultans of Gujarat ===
- Muzzafar Shah, founder of Gujarat Sultanate
- Muhammad Shah
- Ahmad Shah
- Muhammad Shah II
- Daud Shah
- Ahmad Shah II
- Mahmud Shah
- Muzzafar Shah II
- Sikandar Shah
- Mahmud Shah II
- Bahadur Shah
- Mahmud Shah III
- Ahmad Shah III
- Muzzafar Shah III

=== Sayyid Sultans of Delhi ===
- Khizr Khan, founder of the Sayyid dynasty
- Mubarak Shah II
- Muhammad Shah IV
- Alam Shah

=== Raja of Sialkot ===
- Jasrat Khokhar

=== Gakhar Sultans of Potohar ===
- Jhanda Khan Ghakkar
- Tatar Khan Ghakkar
- Hathi Khan Gakkar
- Sarang Khan Gakhar
- Adam Khan Gakhar
- Kamal Khan Gakhar
- Said Khan
- Nazar Khan
- Allah Quli Khan
- Sultan Muqarrab Khan

=== Langah Sultans of Multan ===
- Rai Sahra Langah, founder of the Langah Sultanate
- Husseyn Shah Langah
- Feroz Khan Langah
- Buddha Khan Langah
- Hussain Langah II
- Lashkar Khan Langah

=== Sikh Empire ===
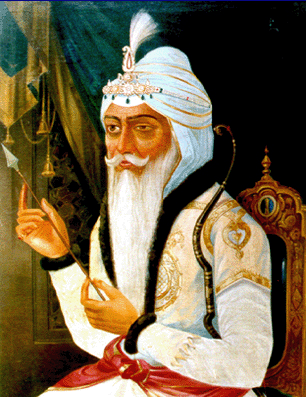
Maharaja Ranjit Singh, founder of the Sikh Empire

- Maharaja Ranjit Singh, founder of Sikh Empire
- Maharaja Kharak Singh, second ruler of the Sikh Empire
- Maharaja Nau Nihal Singh, third emperor of the Sikh Empire.
- Maharaja Sher Singh, was the fourth maharaja of the Sikh Empire.
- Maharaja Duleep Singh was the last Emperor of the Sikh Empire

=== Misl Rulers ===
- Banda Singh Bahadur, Commander-in-chief of Khalsa army
- Ala Singh, First maharaja of Patiala and founder of Phulkian Misl.
- Jassa Singh Ahluwalia founder of Ahluwalia Misl and leader of Dal Khalsa
- Nawab Kapur Singh Organizer of Sikh Confederacy
- Jassa Singh Ramgarhia founder of Ramgarhia Misl
- Jai Singh Kanhaiya one of the most powerful sikh rulers during Sikh Confederacies period founder of Kanhaiya Misl
- Charat Singh founder of Sukerchakia Misl father of Maha Singh and grandfather of Ranjit Singh
- Hari Singh Dhillon one of the most powerful and admired Sikh Worrier leaders of Bhangi Misl
- Maha Singh son of Charat Singh and father of Ranjit Singh second chief of Sukerchakia Misl
- Jhanda Singh Dhillon son of Hari Singh Dhillon under his leadership Bhangi Misl become the most powerful among all the Misls
- Baba Deep Singh founder of Shaheedan Misl

=== Sardars of Jhang ===
- Walidad Khan Sial, founder of the Sial dynasty
- Inayatullah Khan Sial
- Sultan Kabir Khan Sial
- Ahmad Khan Sial

=== Nawab of Punjab ===
- Adina Beg Arain

=== Nizam of Hyderabad ===
- Muzaffar Jang Hidayat

=== Raja of Kashmir ===
- Sukh Jiwan Mal

=== Sultans of Mysore ===
- Hyder Ali
- Tipu Sultan

== Journalists ==
=== Print ===
==== India ====
- Ajit Saini
- Angela Saini
- Aroon Purie
- Barjinder Singh Hamdard
- Barkha Dutt
- Karan Thapar
- Kuldip Nayar
- Pritam Saini
- Sadhu Singh Hamdard
- Swati Mia Saini
- Tarun Tejpal
- Tavleen Singh
- Vikram Chandra
- Vinod Mehta
- Yuyutsu Sharma

==== England ====
- Simon Singh
- Riz Khan

==== Pakistan ====
- Agha Shorish Kashmiri
- Ayaz Amir
- Hameed Nizami
- Janbaz Mirza
- Najam Sethi
- Mazhar Ali Khan
- Mubashir Lucman

=== Electronic/broadcast ===
==== India ====
- Amrita Cheema
- Aniruddha Bahal
- Barkha Dutt
- Daljit Dhaliwal
- Karan Thapar
- Monita Rajpal
- Satinder Bindra
- Tavleen Singh

==== Pakistan ====
- Yawar Hayat Khan
- Mishal Husain
- Hassan Nisar
- Suhail Warraich

== Military ==
=== Pakistan Armed Forces ===
==== Air Force ====
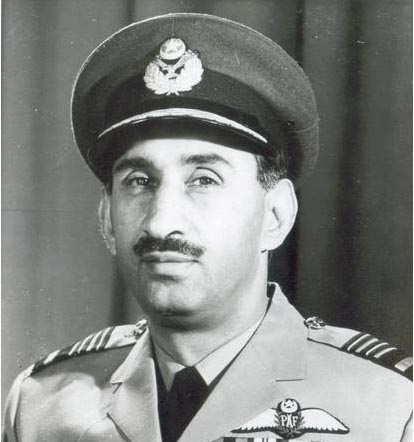
Nur Khan served as the 3rd Commander-in-Chief of the Pakistan Air Force. A notable figure involved in the 1965 War, politician, and statesman, Khan was known for his outstanding management skills that benefited the country, especially in the case of Pakistani cricket and the PIA which under his leadership became one of the world's frontline carriers.

- Air Marshal Nur Khan
- Air Marshal Abdul Rahim Khan
- Air Commodore Sajad Haider
- Air Chief Marshal Mujahid Anwar Khan
- Air Chief Marshal Tanvir Mahmood Ahmed
- Air Vice Marshal Farooq Umar
- Air Vice Marshal Abdul Razzaq Anjum
- Air Chief Marshal Kaleem Saadat
- Air Commodore Rizwan Ullah Khan
- Flight Lieutenant Yunus Hussain
- Air Chief Marshal Rao Qamar Suleman
- Air Chief Marshal Zulfiqar Ali Khan
- Air Marshal Zafar Chaudhry
- Pilot Officer Rashid Minhas
- Group Captain Cecil Chaudhry

==== Army ====
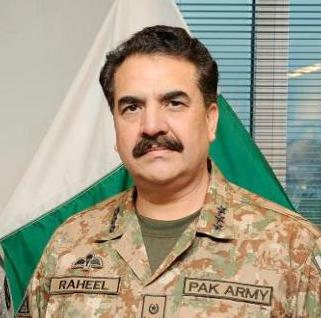
General Raheel Sharif, former Chief of Army Staff of the Pakistan Army is a notable commander in the country's recent history.

- Maj Gen Iftikhar Khan, most senior to succeed General Douglas Gracey as the first native Commander-in-Chief of the Pakistan Army, but was killed in a C-53 crash with 22 others, including his wife and infant daughter before he could take office leading to General Ayub Khan being appointed instead
- General Asim Munir, current Chief of Army Staff of the Pakistan Army
- General (R) Raheel Sharif, former Chief of Army Staff of the Pakistan Army
- General (R) Qamar Javed Bajwa, former Chief of Army Staff of the Pakistan Army
- General Zia ul Haq, former Chief of Army Staff and President of Pakistan
- General (R) Ashfaq Parvez Kayani, former Chief of Army Staff of the Pakistan army
- General (R) Tikka Khan, former Chief of Army Staff of the Pakistan Army
- General Asif Nawaz Janjua, former Chief of Army Staff of the Pakistan Army
- Lt Gen Sarfraz Ali
- Lt Gen (R) Abdul Ali Malik
- Lt Gen (R) Asim Saleem Bajwa
- Lt Gen (R) Nasser Khan Janjua
- Maj Gen (R) Rao Farman Ali
- Maj Gen (R) Muhammed Akbar Khan
- Maj Gen Iftikhar Janjua, most senior Pakistani officer killed in battle during Indo-Pakistani War of 1971 while fighting with his troops on the front line
- Maj Gen (R) Iftikhar Khan, designated as the first native Commander-in-Chief of the Pakistan Army
- Maj Gen (R) Muhammad Yusaf Khan
- Maj Gen (R) Raja Sakhi Daler Khan
- Maj Gen (R) Akhtar Hussain Malik
- Maj Gen (R) Noel Israel Khokhar
- Brig Siddique Salik
- Brig (R) Raja Habib ur Rahman Khan
- Brig (R) Amir Gulistan Janjua
- Major Tufail Mohammad, Nishan-e-Haider
- Major Raja Aziz Bhatti, Nishan-e-Haider
- Major Muhammad Akram, Nishan-e-Haider
- Major Shabbir Sharif, Nishan-e-Haider
- Lieutenant Colonel Haroon Islam
- Captain Raja Muhammad Sarwar, Nishan-e-Haider
- Naik Saif Ali Janjua, Nishan-e-Haider
- Lance Naik Muhammad Mahfuz, Nishan-e-Haider
- Sowar Muhammad Hussain Janjua, Nishan-e-Haider

==== Navy ====
- Admiral (R) Muhammad Asif Sandila
- Admiral (R) Muhammad Afzal Tahir

=== Indian Armed Forces ===
==== Airforce ====
- Air Chief Marshal Om Prakash Mehra, former Chief of Indian Air Force, Awarded highest military peace award.
- Marshal Arjan Singh, former Chief of Indian Air Force; only marshal in the history of Indian Air Force
- Air Chief Marshal Dilbagh Singh, former Chief of Indian Air Force
- Air Chief Marshal Nirmal Chandra Suri, former Chief of Indian Air Force
- Rakesh Sharma, Indian Air Force, first Indian in space

==== Army ====
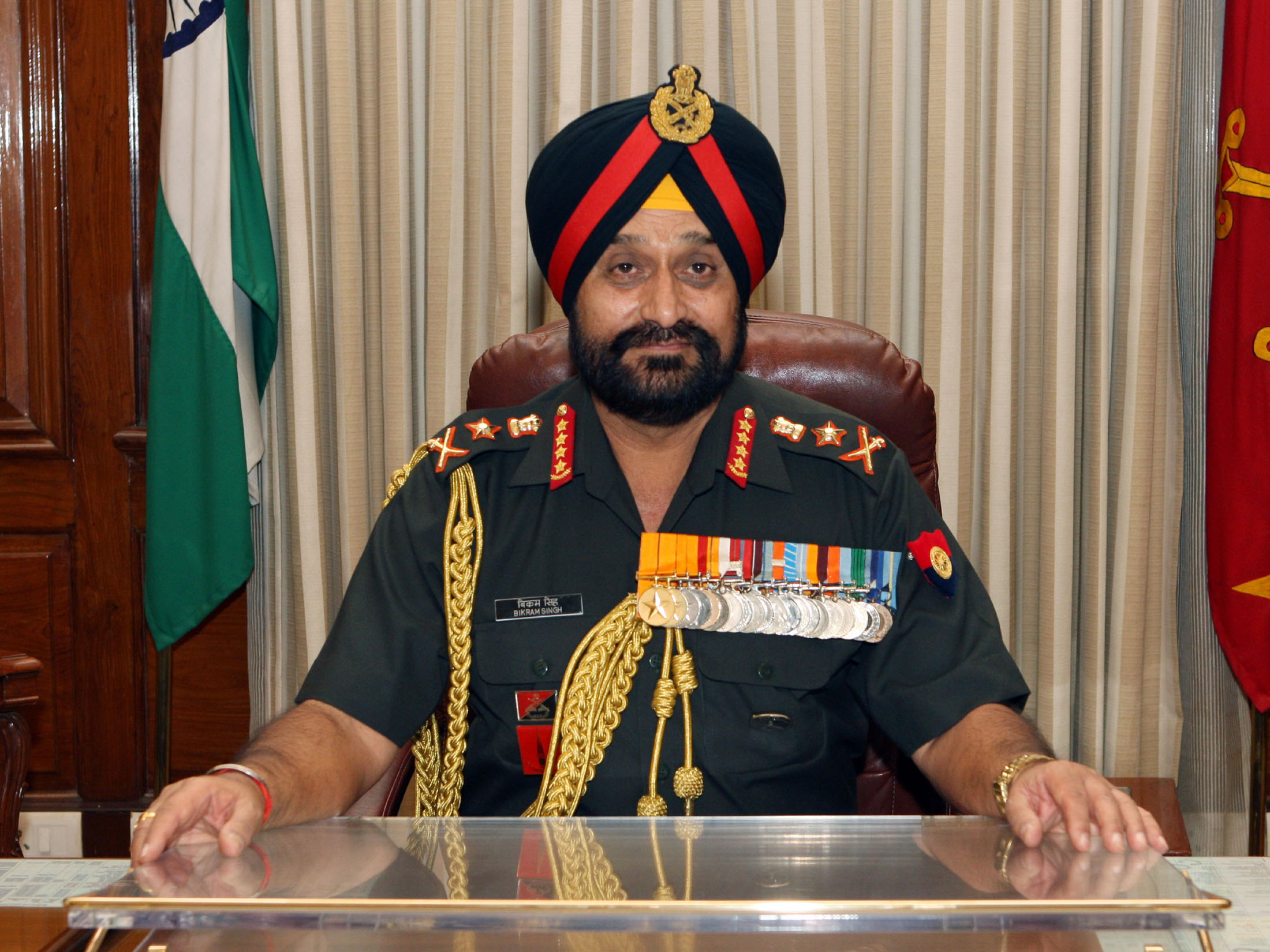
General Bikram Singh, former Chief of Army Staff of the Indian Army

- General Deepak Kapoor, former Indian Army Chief
- General Om Prakash Malhotra, former Indian Army Chief
- Captain Saurabh Kalia, martyr of Kargil war
- General Bikram Singh, former Indian Army Chief
- Captain Arun Singh Jasrotia,
- General Pran Nath Thapar, former Indian Army Chief
- General Nirmal Chander Vij, former Indian Army Chief
- Lt General Jagjit Singh Aurora (1916–2005), General Officer Commanding-in-Chief (GOC-in-C) of the Eastern Command of the Indian Army during the Indo-Pakistani War of 1971; led the ground forces campaign in the eastern front of the war
- Lt General Punita Arora, first woman in the Indian Armed Forces to reach the second highest rank of Lt General; first woman to become the Vice-Admiral of Indian Navy
- Major General Shabeg Singh
- Brigadier Kuldip Singh Chandpuri (retired), awarded Maha Vir Chakra (MVC) by the Indian Army for his leadership in the Battle of Longewala
- Captain Vikram Batra, former officer of Indian army, martyred in 1999 Kargil war and was awarded Param Vir Chakra posthumously
- Lieutenant general Satinder Kumar Saini, former Vice Chief of the Army Staff

==== Navy ====
- Admiral Robin K. Dhowan, former Chief of Indian Navy
- Admiral S.M. Nanda, former Chief of Indian Navy

==== Other notables ====
- Kiran Bedi, first woman IPS officer
- Uday Singh Taunque, awarded the Purple Heart and Bronze Star; first Indian to die in Iraq War as part of the US Army
- Ishar Singh, leader of the 36th Sikhs regiment during the Battle of Saragarhi

=== Singapore Armed Forces ===
- Colonel Gurcharan Singh Sekhon

=== United States Armed Forces ===
- Humayun Khan, army officer who was killed during the Iraq War

== Music ==
=== Pakistan ===
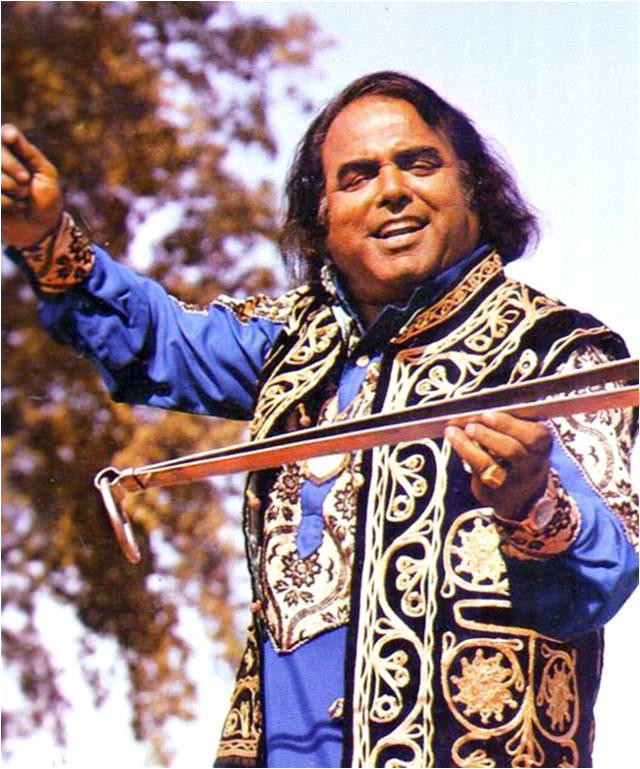
Alam Lohar, considered one of the most important singers of Punjabi folk.

==== Punjabi Folk ====
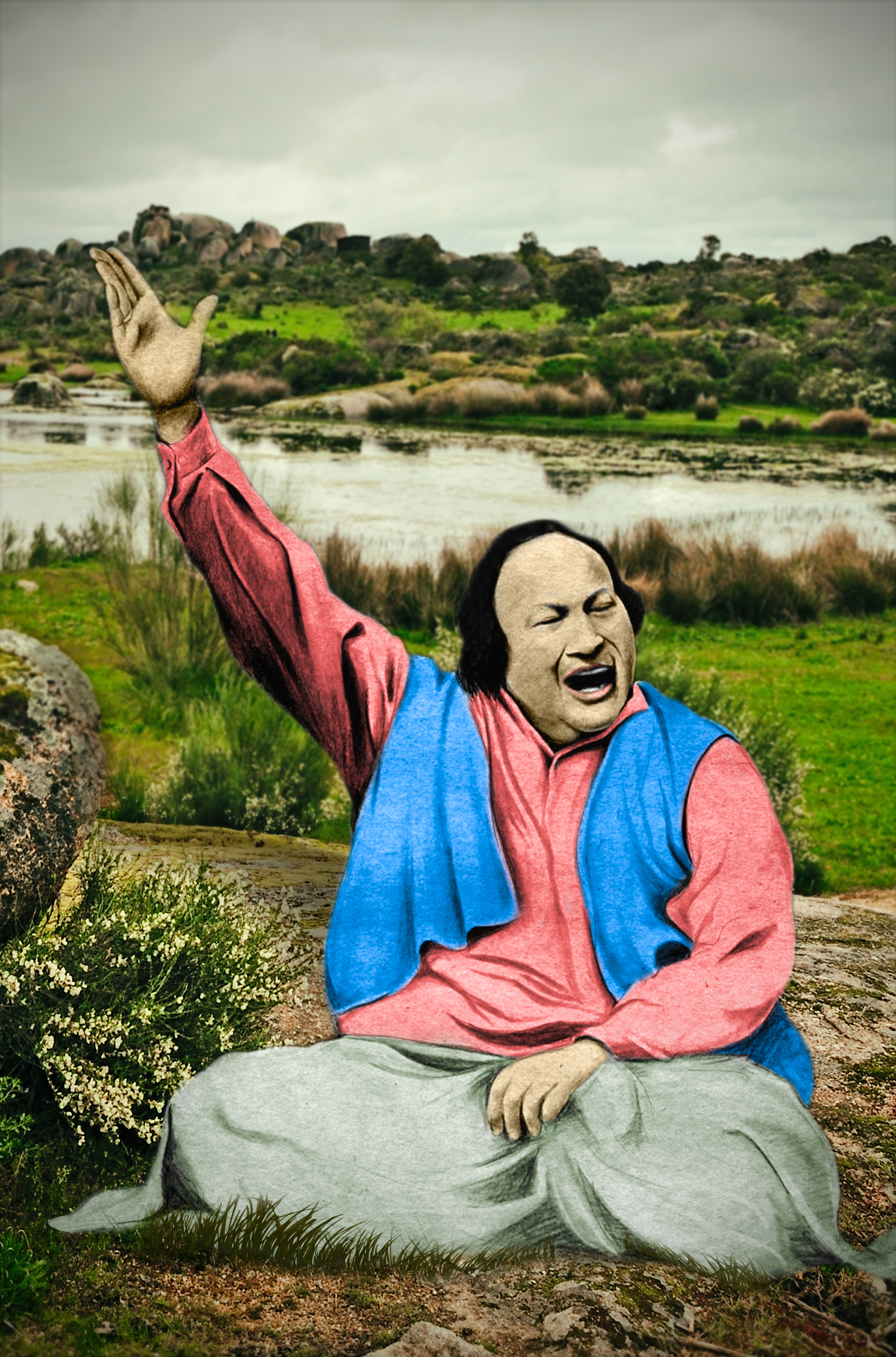
Nusrat Fateh Ali Khan, considered as one of the greatest performers of qawwali.

- Alam Lohar
- Allah Ditta Loonay Wala
- Arif Lohar
- Inayat Hussain Bhatti
- Iqbal Bahu
- Khawaja Pervez
- Mansoor Malangi
- Munawar Sultana (singer)
- Musarrat Nazir
- Pathanay Khan
- Saieen Zahoor
- Samina Syed
- Shaukat Ali
- Shazia Manzoor
- Tahira Syed

==== Sufi Qawwali ====
- Fateh Ali Khan
- Nusrat Fateh Ali Khan
- Farrukh Fateh Ali Khan
- Rahat Fateh Ali Khan
- Badar Miandad
- Ghulam Farid Sabri
- Maqbool Ahmad Sabri
- Amjad Sabri

==== Classical Hindustani Gharanas ====
===== Panjabi Gharana =====
- Shaukat Hussain
- Ustad Tafu Khan
- Tari Khan
- Ustad Zakir Hussain
- Alla Rakha

===== Patiala Gharana =====
- Barkat Ali Khan
- Amanat Ali Khan
- Bade Fateh Ali Khan
- Ghulam Ali
- Hamid Ali Khan
- Asad Amanat Ali Khan
- Farida Khanum

===== Sham Chaurasia Gharana =====
- Salamat Ali Khan
- Sharafat Ali Khan
- Shafqat Ali Khan

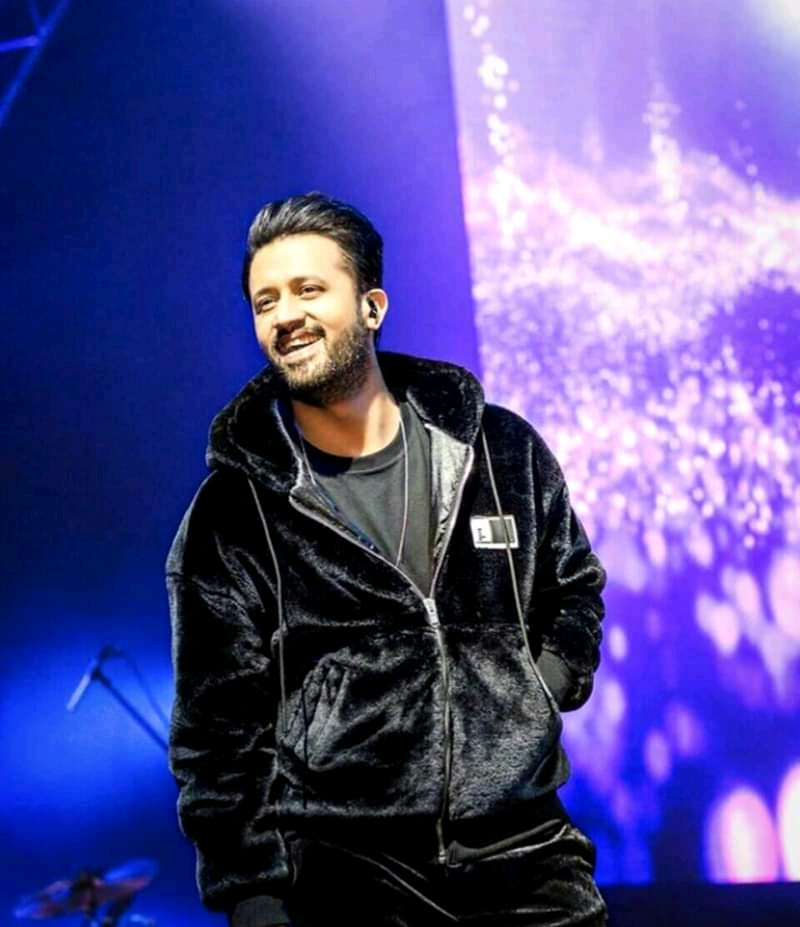
Atif Aslam, widely acclaimed playback singer

==== Modern Playback ====
- Abdullah Qureshi
- Abrar-ul-Haq
- Aima Baig
- Ali Aftab Saeed
- Ali Azmat
- Ali Sethi
- Ali Zafar
- Annie Khalid
- Asrar Shah
- Atif Aslam
- Bilal Saeed
- Bohemia
- Faakhir Mehmood
- Fakhar-e-Alam
- Farhad Humayun
- Farhan Saeed
- Goher Mumtaz
- Hadiqa Kiani
- Haroon
- Humaira Arshad
- Humaira Channa
- Imran Khan
- Javed Bashir
- Jawad Ahmad
- Khursheed Bano
- Mahvash Waqar
- Masood Rana
- Meesha Shafi
- Mustafa Zahid
- Nabeel Shaukat Ali
- Naheed Akhtar
- Naseebo Lal
- Naseem Begum
- Noor Jehan
- Sahir Ali Bagga
- Salman Ahmad
- Sanam Saeed
- Sara Raza Khan
- Shamoon Ismail
- Shiraz Uppal
- Shuja Haider
- Tassawar Khanum
- Umair Jaswal
- Uzair Jaswal
- Waris Baig
- Zil-e-Huma
- Zubaida Khanum
- Zulfiqar Jabbar Khan

=== India ===
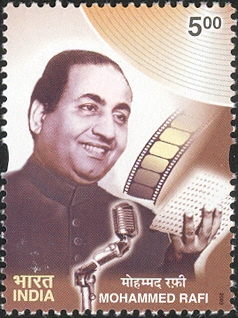
Mohammed Rafi was a singer famous for singing multiple genres and styles

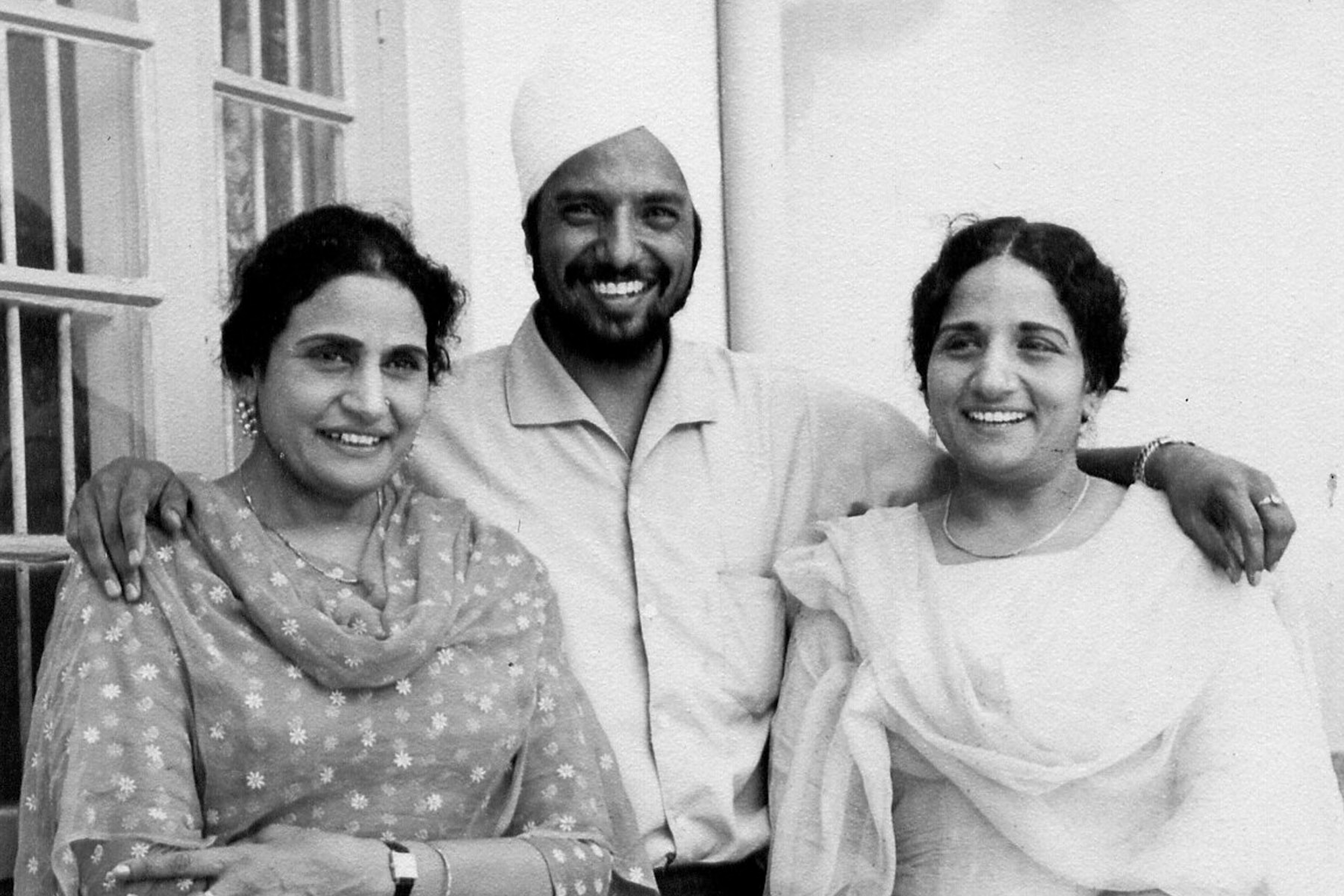
Punjabi folk singers and sisters Parkash Kaur and Surinder Kaur in 1967

==== Punjabi folk ====
- Asa Singh Mastana
- Amar Singh Chamkila
- Didar Sandhu
- Diljit Dosanjh
- Dolly Guleria
- Gurdas Maan
- Hans Raj Hans
- Harbhajan Mann
- Harshdeep Kaur
- Jagmohan Kaur
- Jaswinder Brar
- Kuldeep Manak
- Mohammad Sadiq
- Pammi Bai
- Parkash Kaur
- Ranjit Kaur
- Sardool Sikander
- Satwinder Bitti
- Surinder Kaur

==== Sufi Qawwali ====
- Rabbi Shergill
- Master Saleem
- Puranchand Wadali
- Pyarelal Wadali

==== Hindu devotional ====
- Narendra Chanchal
- Gulshan Kumar
- Hari Om Sharan
- Anup Jalota

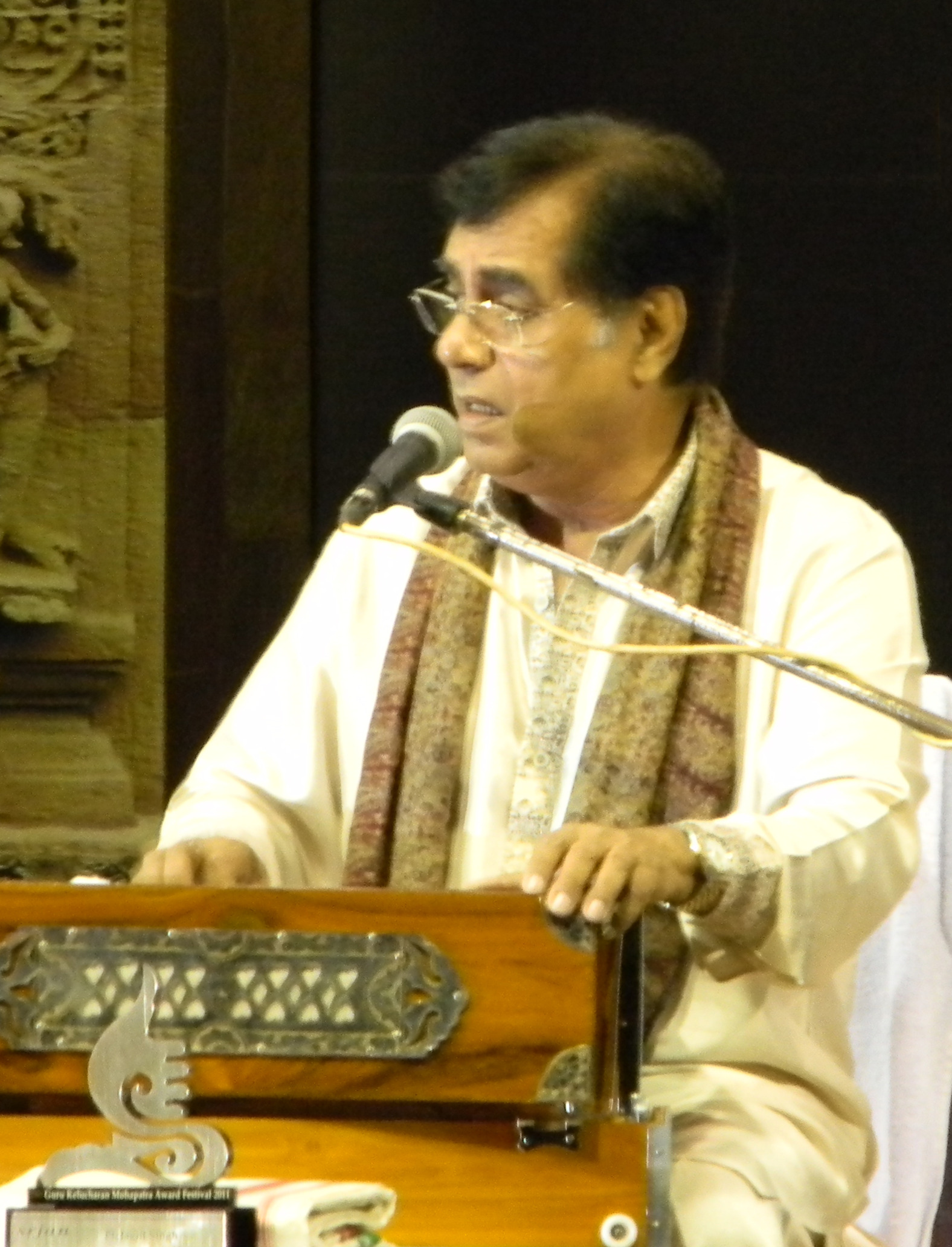
Jagjit Singh, popular ghazal singer

==== Classical Hindustani music ====
- Jagjit Singh

===== Patiala Gharana =====
- Sardool Sikander
- Barkat Sidhu
- Som Dutt Battu
- Shiv Dayal Batish

===== Sham Chaurasia Gharana =====
- Jyoti Nooran
- Sultana Nooran

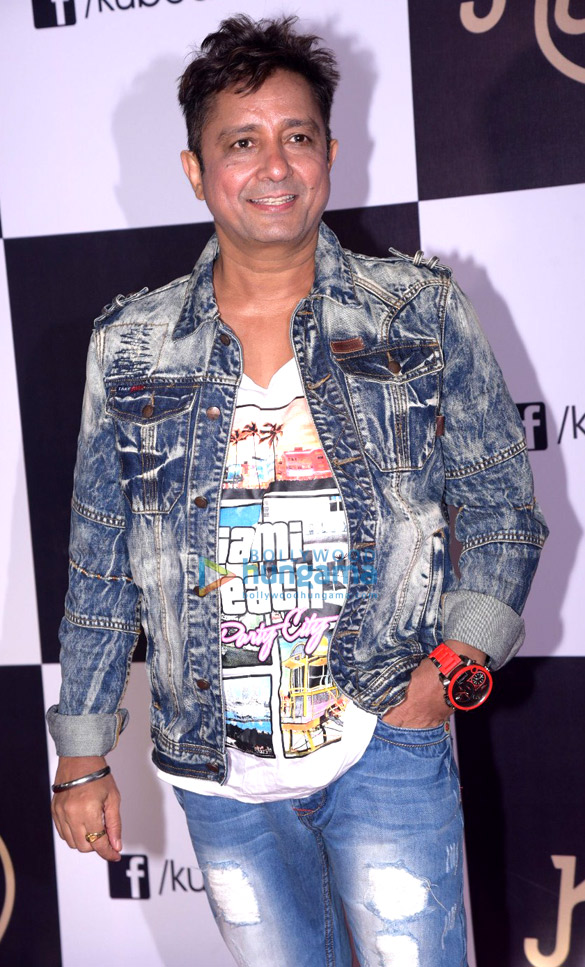
Sukhwinder Singh, singer of Academy and Grammy award-winning song "Jai Ho"

==== Modern playback ====
- AP Dhillon
- Afsana Khan
- Alla Rakha
- Ammy Virk
- Amrinder Gill
- Anushka Manchanda
- Akhil Pasreja
- Akhil Sachdeva
- Arijit Singh
- Arjan Dhillon
- Armaan Malik
- Asees Kaur
- B Praak
- Babbu Mann
- Bhupinder Singh
- Roshan Prince
- Daler Mehndi
- Diljit Dosanjh
- Garry Sandhu
- Gippy Grewal
- Gurinder Gill
- Gurnam Bhullar
- Guru Randhawa
- Hard Kaur
- Hardy Sandhu
- Harshdeep Kaur
- Himani Kapoor
- Honey Singh
- Jasleen Royal
- Jassi Gill
- Jasmine Sandlas
- Jaspinder Narula
- Jass Manak
- Jazzy B
- Jonita Gandhi
- Karan Aujla
- Kanika Kapoor
- Kanth Kaler
- Kavita Seth
- Kundan Lal Saigal
- Labh Janjua
- Mahendra Kapoor
- Meena Kapoor
- Mika Singh
- Mohammed Rafi
- Mohit Chauhan
- Narinder Biba
- Neeraj Shridhar
- Neha Bhasin
- Neha Kakkar
- Nimrat Khaira
- Ninja
- Nitin Mukesh
- Miss Pooja
- Parmish Verma
- Rekha Bhardwaj
- Richa Sharma
- Rupinder Handa
- Satinder Sartaaj
- Shailendra Singh
- Shehnaz Gill
- Shibani Kashyap
- Shipra Goyal
- Sidhu Moose Wala
- Sukhwinder Singh
- Sunanda Sharma
- Suraiyya
- Taz
- Tony Kakkar
- Tulsi Kumar
- Zakir Hussain

== Models ==
- Amarjot Kaur
- Amrita Sher-Gil
- Harnaaz Sandhu, Punjabi beauty pageant titleholder and model who was crowned Miss Universe 2021
- Hasleen Kaur
- Jesse Randhawa, Bollywood model
- Kuljeet Randhawa
- Mahek Chahal
- Mandira Bedi
- Navneet Kaur Dhillon
- Neha Kapur
- Neelam Gill, Burberry
- Gurleen Chopra, model
- Simran Kaur Mundi
- Sonampreet Bajwa

== Politicians ==
=== India ===
- Amarinder Singh
- Arun Jaitley, former Finance Minister of India
- Arvind Khanna
- Ashwani Kumar
- Bhagwant Mann, Chief Minister of Punjab (India)
- Baldev Singh
- Bibi Jagir Kaur
- Buta Singh
- Charanjit Singh Channi, former Chief Minister of Punjab (India)
- Darbara Singh
- Giani Zail Singh, former President of India
- Girdhari Lal Dogra
- Gulzari Lal Nanda
- Gurdial Singh Dhillon
- Harkishan Singh Surjeet
- Inder Kumar Gujral, former Prime Minister of India
- Jagjit Singh Taunque
- Krishan Kant
- Kanshi Ram
- Madanlal Khurana
- Sir Sikandar Hayat Khan
- Malik Umar Hayat Khan
- Manmohan Singh, former Prime Minister of India
- Manohar Lal Khattar, Chief Minister of Haryana
- Master Tara Singh
- Navjot Singh Sidhu
- Parkash Singh Badal
- Pratap Singh Kairon
- Priya Dutt
- Rai Bahadur Chaudhari Dewan Chand Saini
- Rajinder Kaur Bhattal
- Raghav Chadha
- Sant Fateh Singh
- Sardul Singh Caveeshar
- Sheila Dikshit
- Simranjit Singh Mann
- Surjit Singh Barnala
- Sushma Swaraj
- Swaran Singh
- Laxmi Kanta Chawla
- Sukhdev Singh Dhindsa
- Parminder Singh Dhindsa
- Sarup Chand Singla
- Angad Singh Saini

=== Pakistan ===
- Allama Muhammad Iqbal
- Choudhary Rahmat Ali
- Fazal Ilahi Chaudhry
- Chaudhry Muhammad Ali
- Chaudhry Muhammad Sarwar Khan
- Chaudhry Pervaiz Elahi
- Chaudhry Shujaat Hussain
- Chaudhry Afzal Haq
- Chaudhry Amir Hussain
- Feroz Khan Noon
- Ghulam Bibi
- Khizar Hayat Tiwana
- Hamza Shahbaz
- Hanif Ramay
- Liaqat Abbas Bhatti
- Liaqat Ali Khan
- Malik Amjad Ali Noon
- Malik Anwer Ali Noon
- Ghulam Muhammad
- Malik Meraj Khalid
- Master Taj-uj-Din Ansari
- Mazhar Ali Azhar
- Mian Iftikharuddin
- Mian Muhammad Shahbaz Sharif
- Mian Umar Hayat
- Muhammad Rafiq Tarar
- Muhammad Zia-ul-Haq
- Mushahid Hussain Syed
- Nawabzada Nasrullah Khan
- Nawaz Sharif
- Nisar Ali Khan
- Omer Sarfraz Cheema
- Rana Sanaullah Khan
- Rana Mashood Ahmad Khan
- Rana Muhammad Iqbal Khan
- Saqlain Anwar Sipra
- Sardar Ayaz Sadiq
- Shahbaz Sharif
- Shahid Hussain Bhatti
- Sheikh Hissam-ud-Din
- Sheikh Waqas Akram
- Syed Ata Ullah Shah Bukhari
- Syeda Sughra Imam
- Wasim Sajjad

=== United States ===
- Preet Bharara, former member of the U.S. Attorney for the Southern District of New York
- Nikki Haley, Governor of South Carolina, former member of the United States House of Representatives
- Piyush "Bobby" Jindal, Governor of Louisiana, former member of the United States House of Representatives
- Jenifer Rajkumar, Member of New York State Assembly from Queens
- Ro Khanna, Member of United States House of Representatives from California's 17th congressional district
- Zohran Mamdani, Mayor of New York City
- Kiran Ahuja
- Vivek Kundra
- Harry Arora
- Sam Arora
- Gurmit Singh Aulakh
- Balvir Singh
- Ravinder Bhalla
- Ram Nath Puri
- Ranjeev Puri
- Aftab Pureval
- Raj Panjabi
- Aneesh Chopra
- Rohit Chopra
- Harmeet Dhillon
- Shammas Malik
- Manka Dhingra
- Gurbir Grewal
- Gopal Khanna
- Puneet Talwar
- Monika Kalra Varma
- Richard Verma
- Swaranjit Singh Khalsa
- Sabrina Singh
- Faisal Gill
- Daleep Singh
- Jas Jeet Singh
- Saggy Tahir
- Mussab Ali

=== United Kingdom ===
- Rishi Sunak, Prime Minister of the United Kingdom
- Baroness Sayeeda Hussain Warsi
- Seema Malhotra
- Sajid Javid
- Sajjad Karim
- Humza Yousaf, Prime Minister of Scotland
- Gagan Mohindra
- Onkar Sahota
- Paul Uppal
- Preet Kaur Gill
- Anas Sarwar
- Pam Gosal
- Sonia Kumar
- Parmjit Dhanda
- Atma Singh
- Jas Athwal
- Sadiq Khan
- Tan Dhesi
- Imran Hussain
- Shahid Malik
- Neena Gill
- Shabana Mahmood
- Virendra Sharma
- Saqib Bhatti
- Naz Shah
- Piara Khabra
- Afzal Khan
- Satvir Kaur
- Anas Sarwar
- Chaudhry Sarwar
- Yasmin Qureshi
- Faisal Rashid
- Hardyal Dhindsa

=== Canada ===
- Harjit Sajjan
- Jagmeet Singh
- Jag Bhaduria
- Sonia Sidhu
- Navdeep Bains
- Gurratan Singh
- Iqra Khalid
- Gagan Sikand
- Deepak Obhrai
- Ruby Dhalla
- Tim Uppal
- Raj Saini
- Herb Dhaliwal
- Anita Anand
- Gurbux Saini
- Ujjal Dosanjh
- Nina Grewal
- Wajid Khan
- Amarjeet Sohi
- Jyoti Gondek
- George Chahal
- Arpan Khanna
- Amandeep Sodhi
- Vim Kochhar
- Ratna Omidvar
- Harry Sohal
- Raj Pannu
- Bharat Agnihotri
- Rajan Sawhney
- Moe Sihota
- Harry Lali
- Sindi Hawkins
- Karn Manhas
- Raj Chouhan
- Kash Heed
- Niki Sharma
- Rohini Arora
- Sunita Dhir
- Steve Kooner
- Gulzar Singh Cheema
- Diljeet Brar
- Obby Khan
- Jasdeep Devgan
- Tania Sodhi
- Deepak Anand
- Gurratan Singh
- Amarjot Sandhu
- Kuldip Kular
- Nina Tangri
- Gary Grewal
- Ausma Malik

== Revolutionaries ==
- Rai Ahmad Khan Kharal
- Bhagat Singh
- Bhai Mati Das
- Bhai Parmanand
- Choudhry Rahmat Ali
- Ganda Singh Phangureh
- Harnam Singh
- Jahanara Shahnawaz
- Kartar Singh Sarabha
- Lala Lajpat Rai
- Madan Lal Dhingra
- Muhammad Arif Khan Rajbana Sial
- Muhammad Iqbal
- Raja Ghazanfar Ali Khan
- Sardul Singh Caveeshar
- Sukhdev
- Udham Singh
- Harnam Singh Saini

== Religious figures ==
=== Sikh Gurus ===
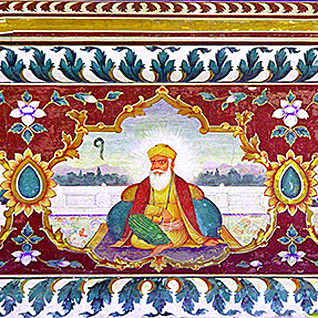
Guru Nanak, founder of Sikhism

- Guru Nanak Dev, founder of Sikhism
- Guru Angad
- Guru Amar Das
- Guru Ram Das
- Guru Arjan Dev, was the first two Gurus Martyred Sikh faith
- Guru Hargobind
- Guru Har Rai
- Guru Har Krishan
- Guru Tegh Bahadur
- Guru Gobind Singh, Last Sikh Guru in human form founder of Khalsa panth

=== Other Sikh figures ===
- Bhai Kanhaiya, he was known for pouring water for all the wounded members of the battlefield no matter whether they were Sikhs or enemies
- Baba Buddha, one of earliest Sikh figures
- Bhai Mardana, was the first Sikh
- Bhai Daya Singh, first in Panj Pyare
- Bhai Jamala Singh Saini, renowned mystic, humanitarian and Sikh warrior of Punjab.

=== Muslim Sufis and saints ===
- Fariduddin Ganjshakar
- Rukn-e-Alam
- Shah Hussain
- Sultan Bahu
- Mian Mir
- Shaikh Ahmad Sirhindi
- Shah Inayat
- Bulleh Shah
- Waris Shah
- Mian Muhammad Baksh
- Khawaja Ghulam Farid
- Meher Ali Shah
- Abdul Hakim Sialkoti

=== Hindu Gurus and saints ===
- Baba Shri Chand
- Swami Rama Tirtha
- Swami Shraddhanand
- Sri Chauranginatha
- Bawa Lal Dayal
- Mastana Balochistani
- Virajanand Dandeesha

=== Buddhist figures ===
- Khema
- Bhadda Kapilani,
- Anoja
- Kumaralata.

=== Radha Soami Satsang Beas ===
- Baba Jaimal Singh
- Baba Sawan Singh
- Sardar Bahadur Maharaj Jagat Singh
- Maharaj Charan Singh
- Baba Gurinder Singh

=== Ahmadiyya ===
- Mirza Ghulam Ahmad (1889–1908)
- Malauna Hakeem Noor-ud-Din (1908–1914)
- Mirza Basheer-ud-Din Mahmood Ahmad (1914–1965)
- Mirza Tahir Ahmad (1982–2003)
- Mirza Masroor Ahmad (2003–present)

== Sportspersons ==
=== Baseball ===
- Jasvir Rakkar
- Muhammad Hussain

=== Chess ===
- Tania Sachdev
- Sultan Khan
- Vaibhav Suri
- Sahaj Grover
- Aryan Chopra
- Vishal Sareen

=== Badminton ===
- Dinesh Khanna
- Tarun Dhillon
- Palak Kohli
- Muhammad Irfan Saeed Bhatti
- Zarina Jamal
- Mandeep Kaur

=== Table Tennis ===
- Manika Batra
- Indu Puri

=== Tennis ===
- Shikha Uberoi
- Neha Uberoi
- Aisam-ul-Haq Qureshi
- Man-Mohan Bhandari
- Kiran Bedi
- Naresh Kumar (tennis)
- Jasjeet Singh (tennis)
- Sanam Singh
- Haroon Rahim
- Shruti Dhawan
- Anu Peshawaria
- Sunil-Kumar Sipaeya
- Chandril Sood
- Lakshit Sood
- Manisha Malhotra
- Vishal Uppal
- Riya Bhatia
- Karman Thandi

=== Cricket ===
==== India ====
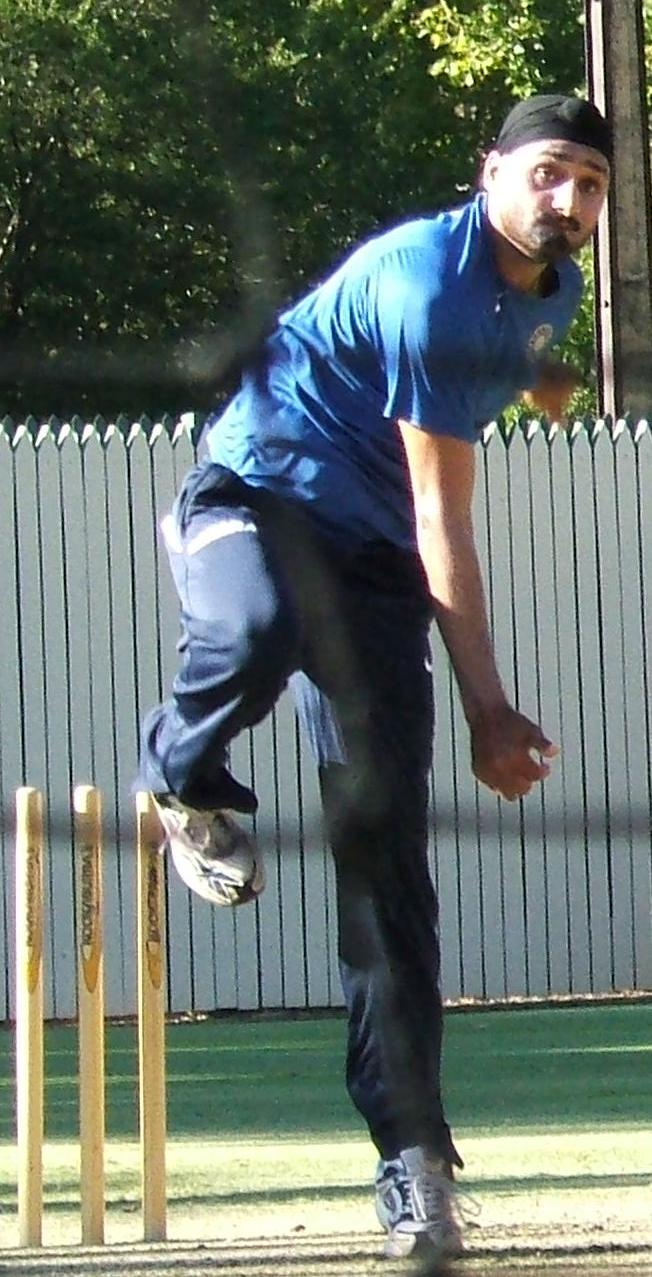
Harbhajan, pictured here bowling in the nets

- Aashish Kapoor
- Akash Chopra
- Amanjot Kaur
- Amarjit Kaypee
- Arshdeep Singh
- Ashok Malhotra
- Atul Wassan
- Balwinder Sandhu
- Bhupinder Singh snr
- Bishan Singh Bedi
- Chetan Sharma
- Gautam Gambhir
- Gurkeerat Singh
- Gursharan Singh
- Harbhajan Singh
- Harleen Deol
- Harmanpreet Kaur
- Harvinder Singh
- Jahangir Khan
- Kapil Dev
- Lala Amarnath
- Madan Lal
- Maninder Singh
- Mohinder Amarnath
- Navjot Singh Sidhu
- Nikhil Chopra
- Paras Dogra
- Piyush Chawla
- Rajinder Ghai
- Reetinder Sodhi
- Sarandeep Singh
- Shikhar Dhawan
- Sunny Sohal
- Surinder Amarnath
- Surinder Khanna
- V. R. V. Singh
- Vijay Mehra
- Virat Kohli
- Yuvraj Singh
- Yograj Singh
- Yadavendra Singh

==== Pakistan ====
Pakistani cricketer Shoaib Akhtar is one of the fastest bowlers in the world.

- Aamer Malik
- Aamer Sohail
- Aaqib Javed
- Abdul Hafeez Kardar
- Abdul Qadir
- Abdul Razzaq
- Aizaz Cheema
- Asif Masood
- Ata-ur-Rehman
- Azeem Hafeez
- Azhar Mahmood
- Babar Azam
- Fazal Mahmood
- Ijaz Ahmed
- Imran Farhat
- Imran Nazir
- Imtiaz Ahmed
- Intikhab Alam
- Inzamam-ul-Haq
- Kamran Akmal
- Khan Mohammad
- Mahmood Hussain
- Majid Khan
- Maqsood Ahmed
- Mohammad Amir
- Mohammad Hafeez
- Mohammad Ilyas
- Mohammad Nazir
- Mohammad Wasim
- Mohammad Yousuf
- Mohammed Asif
- Moin Khan
- Mudassar Nazar
- Mushtaq Ahmed
- Pervez Sajjad
- Rameez Raja
- Rocky Khan
- Saeed Ahmed
- Saleem Altaf
- Saleem Elahi
- Saleem Malik
- Salman Butt
- Saqlain Mushtaq
- Sarfraz Nawaz
- Shabbir Ahmed
- Shadab Khan
- Shoaib Akhtar
- Shoaib Malik
- Shujauddin
- Sohail Tanvir
- Tahir Naqqash
- Talat Ali
- Taufeeq Umar
- Waqar Hasan
- Waqar Younis
- Wasim Akram
- Wasim Raja
- Zaheer Abbas
- Nashra Sandhu
- Sidra Nawaz

==== England ====
- Ajaz Akhtar
- Ajmal Shahzad
- Monty Panesar
- Ravi Bopara

==== Canada ====
- Ashish Bagai
- Harvir Baidwan
- Haninder Dhillon
- Ishwar Maraj
- Jimmy Hansra
- Harjit Singh Sajjan

==== New Zealand ====
- Ish Sodhi

=== Basketball ===
- Sim Bhullar
- Satnam Singh Bhamara
- Amjyot Singh

=== Hockey ===
==== Field hockey ====
- Abdul Rashid
- Ajitpal Singh
- Asif Bajwa
- Balbir Singh Sr.
- Baljeet Singh Saini
- Baljit Singh Dhillon
- Balwant (Bal) Singh Saini
- Gagan Ajit Singh
- Hanif Khan
- Hasan Sardar
- Inder Singh
- Kalimullah
- Kamran Ashraf
- Kulbir Bhaura
- Manzoor Hussain
- Muhammad Shahbaz
- Prabhjot Singh
- Prithipal Singh
- Ramandeep Singh
- Ravi Kahlon
- Saini Sisters
- Shahbaz Ahmed
- Shahnaz Sheikh
- Sardara Singh
- Sohail Abbas
- Wasim Feroz
- Imtiaz Sheikh

==== Ice hockey ====
- Arshdeep Bains
- Jujhar Khaira
- Manny Malhotra
- Kevin Bahl
- Robin Bawa

=== Figure skating ===
- Emanuel Sandhu
- Nishchay Luthra

=== American football ===
- Mike Mohamed

=== Canadian Football ===
- Sukh Chungh

=== Athletics ===
- Arshad Nadeem
- Abdul Khaliq
- Milkha Singh
- Kamaljeet Sandhu
- Haider Ali
- Tajinderpal Singh Toor
- Makhan Singh
- Ajmer Singh
- Muhammad Ramzan Ali
- Harwant Kaur
- Kamalpreet Kaur
- Abdul Malik (athlete)
- Sadaf Siddiqui
- Ghulam Raziq
- Muhammad Nawaz
- Abdul Khaliq (athlete)
- Rabia Ashiq
- Manjit Walia
- Ghulam Abbas (hurdler)
- Navjeet Kaur Dhillon
- Liaqat Ali
- Arpinder Singh
- Mohinder Singh Gill

=== Golf ===
- Ashbeer Saini
- Jeev Milkha Singh
- Jyoti Randhawa
- Arjun Atwal
- P. G. Sethi
- Gaurav Ghei
- Shiv Kapur
- Gaganjeet Bhullar
- Vani Kapoor
- Tvesa Malik
- Amit Luthra
- Himmat Rai
- Aadil Bedi
- Arvind Khanna
- Rahul Bajaj
- Akshay Bhatia
- Kiran Matharu
- Aaron Rai

=== Wrestling ===
- Ghulam Muhammad (The Great Gama)
- The Great Khali, World Heavyweight Champion
- Dara Singh
- Bholu Pahalwan
- Premchand Dogra
- Aslam Pehlwan
- Tiger Jeet Singh
- The Singh Brothers
- Jinder Mahal, WWE Champion
- Akam (wrestler)

=== Shooting ===
- Abhinav Bindra, first individual Olympic gold medalist
- Gagan Narang, the only Indian to win two medals at a World championship
- Avneet Sidhu, Commonwealth Games medalist, Arjun Awardee

=== Cycling ===
- Alexi Grewal, American-Sikh, won gold medal in Olympics
- Imtiaz Bhatti
- Muhammad Shah Rukh
- Harshveer Sekhon
- Suchha Singh
- Muhammad Hafeez (cyclist)
- Amar Singh Billing
- Muhammad Ashiq

=== Soccer (Football) ===
- Michael Chopra, English footballer
- Shaan Hundal, Canadian soccer player
- Harpal Singh
- Yan Dhanda
- Brandon Khela
- Ashvir Singh Johal
- Sunny Singh Gill
- Rikki Bains
- Dilan Markanday
- Mal Benning
- Roger Verdi
- Karanveer Singh Grewal
- Raspreet Sandhu
- Harpal Singh
- Danny Batth
- Aman Dosanj
- Rohan Luthra
- Permi Jhooti
- Jazz Juttla
- Delwinder Singh
- Adeel Younas
- Tanveer Ahmed
- Harmeet Singh
- Gurpreet Singh Sandhu, second Indian goalkeeper and first to professionally play as GK for 1st division European club
- Sandesh Jhingan, India u-23 and national team player, was adjudged the best footballer of the inaugural ISL
- Sharafat Ali
- Haroon Yousaf
- Samar Ishaq
- Gurmeet Singh Chahal
- Amrinder Singh
- Aman Verma (footballer)
- Adnan Ahmed
- Jimmy Khan
- Simranjit Thandi
- Mateen Akhtar
- Inder Singh, former footballer
- Jarnail Singh
- Inderjeet Aujla
- Gurjinder Singh
- Kabir Kohli
- Rashid Sarwar
- Shebby Singh
- Santokh Singh
- Jagvir Singh
- Manprit Sarkaria
- Arjan Raikhy
- Jeevan Badwal
- Muhammad Umar Hayat
- Etzaz Hussain
- Ali Uzair
- Sarpreet Singh, New Zealand footballer
- Masood Fakhri
- Arif Mehmood
- Ghulam Sarwar Teddy
- Mehtab Singh
- Deepak Tangri
- Anwar Ali
- Sarfraz Rasool
- Triman Ranvir, Belgian-Indian footballer

=== Boxing ===
- Amir Iqbal Khan
- Andrew Kooner
- Gurcharan Singh (boxer)
- Sukhdeep Singh Chakria
- Simranjit Kaur
- Kaur Singh
- Pardeep Singh Nagra
- Harpreet Singh (boxer)

=== Volleyball ===
- Nirmal Saini

=== Water Polo ===
- Sushil Kohli
- Gurpreet Sohi

=== Weightlifting ===
- Parvesh Chander Sharma
- Nooh Dastgir Butt
- Harjinder Kaur
- Meena Kumari
- Tara Singh
- Lovepreet Singh
- Gurdeep Singh
- Pardeep Singh
- Rajinder Singh Rahelu
- Talha Talib

=== Freestyle Wrestling ===
- Muhammad Inam Butt
- Muhammad Bashir
- Amar Dhesi
- Zaman Anwar
- Kartar Singh
- Mandhir Kooner
- Sunil Dutt (wrestler)
- Nishan Randhawa
- Madho Singh

=== Mixed martial arts ===
- Jaideep Singh, Indian-Japanese mixed martial artist
- Arjun Bhullar, Punjabi-Canadian mixed martial artist
- Narender Grewal
- Bashir Ahmad

== See also ==
- List of Punjabi Muslims
- Punjabis
- List of British Punjabis
