= Sanjay Saini =

Radiologist at Harvard Medical School

Sanjay Saini is a radiologist at Harvard Medical School. He was in the news in New York Times in 2003 in relation to collaboration with offshore radiologists to provide health care in America.

Saini earned his MD from Tufts Medical School, Boston, Massachusetts. As of 2010 he is professor of radiology, at Harvard Medical School and Vice Chairman for Finance, Department of Radiology, at Massachusetts General Hospital, Boston, MA, USA.

== See also ==
- Avtar Saini
- Deep Saini
- Subhash Saini
- List of Saini people- Scholars and scientists
