= Ashbeer Saini =

Indian golfer

Ashbeer Saini (born 1994) is an Indian amateur golfer. He is the nephew of Baljit Singh Saini, who is an Olympian and Asian Games gold medalist for India in field hockey. Ashbeer Saini's father, Balwinder Singh Saini, who is also the elder brother of Baljeet Singh Saini has also represented India internationally in field hockey.
