= Triman Ranvir =

Belgian footballer (born 2004)

Personal information
- Full name: Triman Ranvir Singh Parihar
- Date of birth: 19 July 2004 (age 22)
- Place of birth: Hasselt, Belgium
- Height: 1.80 m (5 ft 11 in)
- Positions: Winger; striker

Youth career
- 2015–2017: SK Kampelaar
- 2018–2019: Sporting Kampenhout
- 2019–2020: Royale Union Tubize-Braine
- 2020–2022: K. Londerzeel
- 2022–2023: Hilversum

Senior career*
Years	Team	Apps	(Gls)
2022	Pori Akatemia	4	(1)
2023	Minerva Punjab	0	(0)
2023–	K. Berchem	3	(0)
2025–	Landen	2	(0)
- * Club domestic league appearances and goals

Triman Ranvir (born 19 July 2004) is a Belgian professional footballer who plays as both winger and forward for the Eerste Provinciale club Landen.

== Early and personal life ==
Ranvir was born on 19 July 2004 in Hasselt, Belgium. The son of Belgian businessman Sardaar Ranvir Singh, Triman was first introduced to football in his childhood. He later moved from Hasselt to Kampenhout and settled there. Both of his parents are Indian, born in Punjab, raised in the country, and belonged to the city of Jalandhar.

It's a difficult choice and has a lot of risk involved. I am the first person from the top 6–7 footballing countries in Europe to have taken such a step. I had tears in my eyes at the airport thinking that there would be no coming back to Belgium. But it is a great time to be part of Indian football, the potential for growth is immense. I want to be part of that growth and eventually play for the Indian team.

— Triman Ranvir, on his move to Indian football from Belgium.

Ranvir is a practitioner of Sikhism and is of Indian Punjabi heritage. In March 2023, he left Belgium and arrived in India to change his nationality and eventually play for the India national football team. In his football life, Ranvir idolizes both Sunil Chhetri and Manvir Singh.

I have got much love in India and after my tour in India I have started reciving [sic] more love from Indian people. Generally I don't get such response from Belgium. In India, the passion is more than that of Belgium.

— Triman Ranvir, on considering India as future.

Ranvir holds Overseas Citizenship of India (OCI) card.

== Club career ==
Ranvir began his youth football career at the age of eleven in 2015 in Belgian club SK Kampelaar. He also appeared with VRS Academy. Ranvir represented MuSan Salama at the Finnish U21 FA Cup.

=== Royale Union Tubize-Braine ===
In 2019, Ranvir signed with Belgian Division 2 outfit Royale Union Tubize-Braine and appeared with club's U17 team in provincial league.

=== Londerzeel SK ===
After a short spell with Royal Union Tubize-Braine, he joined K Londerzeel SK on a one-year deal. He soon extended his contract with the club and moved to their U19 team.

=== Hilversum ===
After achieving success in three consecutive seasons in Belgium, Ranvir plied his trade abroad and signed with Dutch Derde Divisie outfit Hilversum in 2022 after playing for VRS Academy based in Amsterdam. He was part of the VRS Academy U17 side that participated in Heemskerk Cup in 2022, and they later finished as runners-up after being defeated by Brazilian club Fluminense (youth) in final. He represented the club in Divisie 6 Hilversum JO18-1 and also faced various professional teams across Europe during their foreign tours.

=== Pori Akatemia ===
Ranvir appeared with Finnish club Pori Akatemia in the 2022 edition of TUL Cup, in which he scored a goal against Toukolan Teräs in their 3–1 defeat on 12 March.

He later appeared with Finnish Ykkönen club Musan Salama.

=== In India ===
After arriving in India, he joined Minerva Punjab and turned down offer of training cum trial stint by the Indian Super League club Kerala Blasters.

=== K. Berchem ===
Ranvir returned to Belgium in August, then joined Belgian Division 2 club K. Berchem.

=== Landen ===
In 2025, Ranvir signed with Eerste Provinciale outfit Landen. He made his debut in the prestigious Belgian Cup on 27 July in a round 1 match against JB Eigenbilzen, in which he scored a goal in their 6–0 win.

== International career ==
Ranvir is eligible to represent Belgium internationally, and was once picked up for the national U15 camp in 2018. However, in 2023, he moved to India and began the process of acquiring Indian citizenship by giving up his Belgian passport, to represent India.

== Honours ==
VRS Academy – FC Hilversum U17

- Heemskerk Cup runner-up: 2022

== See also ==
- List of Punjabi people
