= Swaranjit Singh Khalsa =

American politician (born c. 1985)

Swaranjit Singh Khalsa (c. 1985) is the mayor elect for the city of Norwich in New London County, Connecticut. On November 4, 2025, Khalsa became the first Sikh to be elected Mayor of Norwich. In 2021, Khalsa became the first Sikh to be elected to a city council in Connecticut.

== Personal life ==
Khalsa was born in Jalandhar, India circa 1985. Khalsa's father is Parminderpal Singh Khalsa and has represented the Sikh International Society. Khalsa's wife is from Ludhiana. They had a daughter in May 2016.

Khalsa immigrated to the United States in 2007 and attended graduate school in New Jersey. He moved to Norwich in 2010. He operated a Shell gas station and a construction business.

On April 28, 2017 at the FBI Headquarters, FBI Director James Comey awarded Khalsa with the 2016 Director's Community Leadership Award (DCLA).

== Political career ==
In 2017, Khalsa bought and paid for multilingual welcome signs to be put up at two of Norwich city's entrances after being inspired by similar signs in Vancouver.

In 2019, Khalsa was elected to Norwich's Board of Education. At the time, Khalsa was the only Sikh elected official in Connecticut. On April 25, 2019, Khalsa, along with 22 other Connecticut community learders, graduated from the FBI Citizens Academy, where they learned how the FBI operates and what services are available to residents. They graduation ceremony was at University of New Haven's Henry C. Lee Forensic Sciences Institute.

In 2021, he was elected to Norwich's city council. He was the first Sikh to be elected to a city council in all of Connecticut.

The Norwich Democratic Town Committee had nominated Khalsa to run for mayor. On November 4, 2025, Khalsa won the Norwich's Mayoral election as a Democrat and defeated Republican Tracy Gould and Marcia Wilbur, who was unaffiliated. He became the first Sikh to be elected Mayor.
