= Pritam Saini =

Punjabi journalist (1927–2003)

Dr. Pritam Saini (1927–2003) was a Punjabi journalist, literary critic and history scholar. He served as Research Fellow at Punjabi University, Patiala in Punjab, India and was also a member of academic bodies such as the Punjab History Conference and Indian History Congress.
