= Sangat Singh Saini =

Sardar Sangat Singh Saini was a general in the army of Maharaja Ranjit Singh in the Sikh Empire. He oversaw the operations in the Gurdaspur District. His headquarters were in Batala. Sardar Sangat Singh was rewarded 300-acre (1.2 km^{2}) estate from Maharaja Ranjit Singh for bravery in battle when Sangat Singh conquered a post in the Afghan region and brought back the Golden Sword of the Afghan ruler to Maharaja Ranjit Singh. The estate is now known as Sangatpur in Batala, Gurdaspur District, India.
