= Purshottam Lal Wahi =

Indian cardiologist (1928–2000)

- Born: 4 December 1928 (age 97); Sargodha, Punjab, British India
- Occupation: Cardiologist
- Spouse: Pushpa
- Parent(s): Bindra Ban Wahi; Devki Devi
- Awards: Padma Shri

Purshottam Lal Wahi (1928–2000) was an Indian cardiologist and the director of the department of cardiology at Post Graduate Institute of Medical Education and Research, Chandigarh. Born in Sargodha in the Punjab province of the erstwhile British India on 4 December 1928 to Bindra Ban Wahi and Devki Devi, he was an honorary fellow of the Indian Society of Cardiology and is credited with several publications on cardiology. The Government of India awarded him the fourth highest Indian civilian honour of Padma Shri in 1983.
