= Harvinder Sahota =

Indian American cardiologist (born 1941)

- Born: Iqbal; 15 April 1941 (age 85); Basti Tankawali, Ferozepur, Punjab, British India
- Other names: H Sahota, Harry Sahota, Harvy Sahota
- Education: University of Punjab M.B.B.S. (1965); University of Liverpool (1970); Cardiff University (1971); University of Rochester (1976)
- Occupations: Cardiologist, surgeon
- Years active: 1976-present
- Known for: Perfusion balloon angioplasty
- Board member of: Orange County Emergency Medicine Commission; Metro Hospital Heart Institute; Institute of Therapy, Tbilisi; Claremont Lincoln University

Harvinder Sahota (born 15 April 1941) is an Indian-American cardiologist. He invented the FDA-approved perfusion balloon angioplasty, known as "Sahota Perfusion Balloon".

Sahota holds two dozen patents for medical inventions including the use of red laser light to prevent restenosis, multi-lobe balloons, fibrin-coated stents, and hemostats to stop bleeding from ruptured arteries during the procedure. He holds a license to promote a drug-coated stent. He performed the first coronary angioplasty in various hospitals, including in India, Mexico, Russia, Ukraine, and the United States.

He has served as the vice chairman and chairman of the Orange County Emergency Medicine Commission in California and as the research director and an advisory board member of the Metro Hospital Heart Institute in New Delhi, India, and Tbilisi, Georgia. Currently, he serves on the board of directors of Claremont Lincoln University.

== Early life and education ==
Sahota was born on 15 April 1941 to Lachman Singh and Dhan Kaur in Basti Tankawali, near Ferozepur in the state of Punjab, India. He was named Iqbal. At the age of five, his name was changed to Harvinder after suffering a medical setback during which he was declared dead. Because he was revived by a physician, the event was considered a second birth, requiring a new name.

== Career ==
In 1985, Sahota invented the "Sahota Perfusion Balloon", which allows blood to flow to the heart muscle during inflation and helps to prevent chest pain during the operation. After getting the US FDA approval in the 1980s the balloon is now used in angioplasty surgeries around the world. Sahota went on to invent several other devices. On 17 January 1990 Sahota performed the first coronary angioplasty in North India and nine more followed in the week that the team spent in Chandigarh.

In 2000, Sahota received the Distinguished Physician Award presented by former Indian Prime Minister I. K. Gujral. Also, he was honored by the National Federation of Indian-American Associations in the United States.

In 2012, Sahota was honored by the American Heart Association for his cardiovascular science and medicine research and his significant contribution to interventional cardiology. That same year, he received also the Golden Orange Award by the World Affairs Council of Orange County.

== Awards, honors and recognitions ==
- American Heart Association Award (2012)
- Golden Orange Award (2012) - World Affairs Council
- Excellence in Medicine Award - Global Indian Congress (2003)
- Distinguished Physician Award - presented by I.K. Gujral, Prime minister of India (2000)
- Plaque of Excellence in Medicine - National Federation of Indian American Association, Dallas (2000)

== Publications ==
- Harvy Sahota, et al., (2000) "Endoluminal Reconstruction of the Arterial Wall with Endothelial Cell/Glue Matrix Reduced Restenosis in an Atherosclerotic Rabbit," Journal of the American College of Cardiology, Vol. 36. No. 4.
- Harvy Sahota, et al., (2000), "Long-term Follow-up after Coronary Stenting and Intravascular Red Laser Therapy," American Journal of Cardiology, Vol. 86 (9): 927–937.
- Vossoughi Jafar, (2000), "Stent Graph Update," Medical & Engineering Publisher Inc. ISN 1-903-636-00-8.

== Bibliography ==
- Sharma, Rashmee (2011). Roshni: The Light of South Asia North America. Singapore: Tien Wah Press. ASIN B007MOVP88.
- Singh, Kushwant (2007). The Sikhs Unlimited. New Delhi: Rupa & Co. ISBN 978-81-291-1207-1.
- Singh, Gurmukh (2006). California Dream. Canada: British Columbia Books. ASIN B007HG6WBG.
- Singh, Gurmukh (2004). A Hero of American Hearts: Dr. Harvinder Sahota Pioneer in Angioplasty. New Delhi: Rupa & Co. ISBN 81-291-0515-2.
- Singh, Gurmukh (2004). The Rise of the Sikhs Abroad. New Delhi: Rupa & Co. ISBN 81-291-0068-1.
