= Janak Raj Talwar =

Indian cardiothoracic surgeon

- Born: 1 January 1931; Amritsar, Punjab, India
- Died: 21 November 2002 (aged 71)
- Education: Government Medical College, Amritsar
- Known for: Cardiothoracic surgery; Vascular surgery
- Awards: 1967 ICMR Amir Chand Prize; 1970 Shanti Swarup Bhatnagar Prize
- Scientific career
- Fields: Cardiology
- Workplaces: Punjab Medical service; AIIMS Delhi; Sir Ganga Ram Hospital; Holy Family Hospital

Janak Raj Talwar (1 January 1931 – 21 November 2002) was an Indian cardiothoracic surgeon who served in many major Indian medical centres, such as the All India Institute of Medical Sciences, Delhi, Sir Ganga Ram Hospital, the Holy Family Hospital, and the Laxmipat Singhania Institute of Cardiology, Kanpur.

Talwar was known to have done significant work on the treatment of cold injuries which are resulted from exposure to extreme cold conditions and proposed prophylactic as well as therapeutic measures. Besides, he pioneered thoracic surgery in North India and established specialty departments for the discipline at several hospitals. He received Amir Chand Prize of the Indian Council of Medical Research in 1967. The Council of Scientific and Industrial Research, the apex agency of the Government of India for scientific research, awarded him the Shanti Swarup Bhatnagar Prize for Science and Technology, one of the highest Indian science awards for his contributions to Medical Sciences in 1970. He died on 21 November 2002 at the age of 71.
