= Jessie Singh Saini =

Jessie Singh Saini (full name Jaswinder Singh Saini: August 24, 1958 – December 9, 2014) was the founder of BJS Electronics and an American industrialist of Indian descent. Jessie was also a well known-political donor, in California, and both Bill Clinton and Al Gore have paid visits to his house during their incumbencies as president and vice president of the US.

== Origin and early life ==
He completed his education at Punjab Agricultural University at Ludhiana before migrating to the US in 1986.

== Awards and recognition ==
Jessie was the first Indian to receive the Civil rights award – the Edna Magee Award from the Santa Clara County in 1998. He also went to the Philippines as a state guest in 1996 and was honored by the Pope for helping to raise money for Vietnamese refugees stranded in the Philippines.

He was also honored in his native Punjab with Punjab Ratan award by Prakash Singh Badal, the Chief Minister of Punjab.
