= Khushwant Lal Wig =

Indian physician, medical academic and writer

- Born: 30 September 1904; Gujranwala, Punjab, British India
- Died: 8 June 1986 (aged 81); Bern, Switzerland
- Occupations: Physician; Academic; Writer
- Years active: 1931–1986
- Known for: Medical academics and research
- Spouse: Shanta Puri
- Children: 3
- Awards: Padma Bhushan; Dr. B. C. Roy Award

Khushwant Lal Wig (1904–1986) was an Indian physician, medical academic, writer and the director of the All India Institute of Medical Science, New Delhi. He was a Fellow of the Royal College of Physicians of London and a recipient of Dr. B. C. Roy Award, the highest Indian award in the medical category. The Government of India awarded him the third highest civilian honour of the Padma Bhushan, in 1964, for his contributions to the Medical science.

== Biography ==
Kushwant Lal Wig was born on 30 September 1904 to Mohan Lal Wig and Dhan Devi Chib in a rich family of Gujranwala, in the Punjab region of the British India and did his schooling at the local Mission High School, after which he studied at the Government College and, later, at Dayanand Anglo Vedic College, Lahore, from where he secured his graduate degree. After obtaining his graduate degree in medicine from King Edward Medical College, present-day King Edward Medical University, of the Punjab University, Lahore, he did his residency at Mayo Hospital, Lahore and proceeded to London to complete his post graduate studies (MRCP) at the Charing Cross Hospital Medical School in 1931. Returning to India, he joined his alma mater, King Edward Medical College, and Mayo Hospital, as an assistant professor at the department of medicine in 1941, continuing there till 1946. After the Indian independence in 1947, he moved to Amritsar to join the Victoria Jubilee Hospital (later-day Government Medical College, Amritsar) as the professor of medicine. While working at V. J. Hospital, he also served as a member of faculty at Punjab University until 1958 when he moved to the All India Institute of Medical Sciences, New Delhi as a professor of medicine and, later, as the director of the institution till his superannuation in 1969.

Wig served as an examiner at several universities including Punjab University, Lahore, Punjab University, Chandigarh, University of Madras, Lucknow University, Patna University and the University of Delhi and sat on the boards of universities of Lucknow and Delhi. Associating with the Indian Council of Medical Research, he served as a member of the sub-committee attending to clinical trials and was the president of the annual conference of the Indian Association of Chest Diseases in 1961. He published around 55 medical articles and headed the board of editors of the Punjab Medical Journal. After getting elected as a Fellow of the American College of Chest Physicians (ACCP) in 1950, he worked as the governor of the North India chapter of ACCP for a period. He was a recipient of the Dr. B. C. Roy Award from the Medical Council of India and a founder fellow of the National Academy of Medical Sciences. The Royal College of Physicians of London elected him as their Fellow in 1961 before the Government of India honoured him with the civilian honour of the Padma Bhushan in 1964. In 1962, he also served as the honorary physician to the President of India.

Wig, who was honoured by the Banaras Hindu University with honorary doctorate (DSc), died on 8 June 1986, at Bern, Switzerland, survived by his wife Shanta Puri and their son and two daughters. The All India institute of Medical Sciences named their Centre for Medical Education as K. L. Wig Centre for Medical Education and Technology, in honour of its former director and the National Academy of Medical Sciences instituted an annual oration under the name, Dr. K. L. Wig Oration. The story of his life has been documented in his autobiography, Memoirs of a Medical Man.

== See also ==
- Charing Cross Hospital Medical School
- King Edward Medical University
