= Inderjeet Aujla =

English footballer (born 1987)

Personal information
- Date of birth: 25 October 1987 (age 39)
- Place of birth: England
- Positions: Defender; midfielder

Senior career*
| Years | Team | Apps | (Gls) |
| 2004–2006 | Bradford City | | |
| 2006–2007 | Chester City | | |
| 2007 | Guiseley | | |
| 2007 | Bacup Borough | | |
| 2010 | Garforth Town | | |
| 2011–2012 | RRFC Montegnée | | |
| 2012 | Hinckley United | | |
| 2012 | Frickley Athletic | | |
| 2013 | Whitehawk | | |
| 2013–2014 | Boston United | | |
- * Club domestic league appearances and goals

Inderjeet Aujla (born 25 October 1987) is a UEFA A Licensed coach and English former footballer who played as a defender or midfielder. He was player manager of RRFC Montegnee in Belgium aged 24 and more recently Head Coach of Athletico FC and currently coaches in the academy at Bradford City of which he graduated from himself as a player into the youth team in 2004.

== Early life ==
As a youth player, Aujla joined the youth academy of English side Bradford City AFC. He was regarded as one of the club's most important players. He won young Player of the Year at club in the youth team.

== Career ==
In 2011, Aujla signed for Belgian side RRFC Montegnée. He was described as a "regular as a right-back in the team" while playing for the club.

== Style of play ==
Aujla can operate as a defensive midfielder. He can also operate as a full-back.

== Personal life ==
Aujla is of Indian descent. He has enjoyed reading football biographies.
