= Manoj Datta =

Indian engineer

Manoj Datta is an Indian engineer specialized in geotechnical engineering, foundation engineering, ground engineering, earth dams, landfill engineering and geoenvironmental engineering. He is a native of northwestern India, where he was born in 1955 in the town of Jalandhar in Punjab, India. His early years were at the Nangal township where his father was posted as an engineer. Datta finished his school education at St. John’s High School at Chandigarh. Datta obtained his B.Tech (Civil Engineering) from IIT Delhi in 1977 and then obtained his Ph.D. degree from the same institute in 1980.

He was the Director of Punjab Engineering College University of Technology where he undertook various assignments as enshrined in the MoU and Articles of the Institute gaining respect from colleagues and students alike; along with being Chairperson, Organizing Committee of 6th International Congress on Environmental Geotechnics,. He was also held the office of Dean (Alumni & International Programmes) at Indian Institute of Technology Delhi (2004–2007) and retains his lien as Professor of Civil Engineering at the same institute.

== Awards ==
- Director's silver medal at I.I.T. Delhi for being first amongst Civil Engineering Students Graduating in 1977.

== Publications ==
- Raju, V.S., Datta, M., Seshadri, V., and Agarwal, V.K. (1996) (Eds.), "Ash Ponds and Ash Disposal Systems", Narosa Publishers, Delhi,424 pages.
- Datta, M. (1997) (Ed.), "Waste Disposal in Engineered Landfills", Narosa Publishers, Delhi, 231 pages.
- Datta, M., Parida, B.P., Guha, B.K. and Sreekrishnan, T., (1999) (Eds.), "Industrial Solid Waste Management and Landfilling Practice", Narosa Publishers, Delhi, 204 pages.
- Gulhati, S.K. and Datta, M (2005), Geotechnical Engineering, Tata Mcgraw Hill, Delhi, 738 pages

Datta also published over 101 papers (including 21 in journals, 33 in International Conferences and 47 in National Conferences and Seminars)
