= Manjit Singh (armament scientist) =

Indian scientist

Dr.Manjit Singh
- Born: 18 November 1958 (age 67); Punjab
- Scientific career
- Fields: Material Sciences, Armament
- Workplaces: TBRL

Dr. Manjit Singh (born 18 November 1958) is a scientist with the Defence Research & Development Organization (DRDO) under the Ministry of Defence (India). He is currently serving as the Director of Terminal Ballistics Research Laboratory (TBRL) in Chandigarh.

== Education ==
Dr. Manjit Singh has done his M.Sc. from Panjab University in 1982. He has done his Doctrait in 2001 in "Metals Under High Stress and Strain Rates".

== Current work ==
Dr. Manjit Singh specializes in the fields of Detonics of High Explosives, High Pressure Physics in Dynamic Shock Wave Loading and Materials Under High Stress and Strain Rates. Currently he is the head of Quality Management Group, Shock & Detonics Division and Gun Group.

He also has experience in the field of Missiles, missile War-heads and strategic devices.

He played a key role in the success of Pokhran-II.

He is an active member of the Armament Research Board of India. He is also an active member of the High Energy Materials Society of India. He has served on the National Organizing Committee of the International Conference on Optics & Photonics (ICOP-2009).

Dr. Manjit Singh is also the Chairman of the DRDO North Zone Sports Council.

== Publications ==
Dr. Manjit Singh has 31 international publications and 15 national publications to his credit.
