= Baljit Singh Saini =

Indian field hockey player

Medal record

Representing India

Men's field hockey

Asian Games
Gold medal – first place	1998 Bangkok	Team

Asia Cup
Gold medal – first place	2003 Kuala Lumpur	Team
Bronze medal – third place	1999 Kuala Lumpur	Team

Baljit ("Baljeet") Singh Saini (born 12 August 1976 in Ropar, Punjab) is a field hockey defender and midfielder from India who made his international debut for the Men's National Team in 1995 during the Indira Gandhi Gold Cup. Baljit Singh Saini represented his native country at two consecutive Summer Olympics, starting in 1996 in Atlanta, Georgia, where India finished in eighth place. His older brother Balwinder Singh was also a field hockey international for India.

Baljit has won many awards. In June 2008 he visited the US again, while participating in tournaments. He participated in many tournaments throughout the US, visiting many different states and cities during his triumphut run. Baljit also has family who resides in Fresno, California (USA) and he was honored by the Indian Community of Fresno, CA. In an event organized by Rama Kant Dawar and Paramjit Singh Mond, hosted by Kam Nigam, Baljit received an Honorary Recognition Award for his successes.
