= Subhash Saini =

American computer scientist

Dr. Subhash Saini is a senior computer scientist at NASA. In 2024, he is a member of the Ames Research and Technology Council.

== Education and academic positions ==
He received a Ph.D. from the University of Southern California and has held positions at University of California, Los Angeles (UCLA), University of California, Berkeley (UCB), and Lawrence Livermore National Laboratory (LLNL).

== Publications ==
He has published extensively in fields such as High End Computing (HEC), producing three conference proceedings and 257 peer-reviewed papers in journals including Performance Evaluation and Engineering. He also co-wrote a chapter in the Handbook of Nanostructured Materials and Nanotechnology (Academic Press).

In late 2024 he had an h-index of 31.

== Professional activities ==
Saini joined NASA Advanced Supercomputing Division (NAS) at the NASA Ames Research Center in 1989. He has served on the program committees of several national and international conferences including the ACM/IEEE Supercomputing Conference (SC) 2004, HiPC 2004, HPCC 2016, IPDPS 2006 and IARIA INFOCOMP 2014.

He has also held the following board and panel positions:

- Chair of the ACM Gordon Bell Award (sometimes referred to as the “Nobel Prize in Supercomputing”) 2015-2017
- Member of the Source Evaluation Board (SEB) for NASA Advanced Supercomputing Services (NACS)
- Panelist and reviewer for Exascale Computing Project (ECP) as part of the National Strategic Computing Initiative (NSCI)
- Reviewer and panelist for various IT research for the United States Department of Energy, United States Department of Defense, National Science Foundation, and NASA
- Member of the US Government interagency panel for IT strategic research

== Awards ==
- Best technical paper award for “Scalable atomistic simulation algorithms for materials research”, in computer architectures and networks category, at ACM/IEEE SC 2001
- Best technical paper award for “The impact of hyper-threading on processor resource utilization in production applications”, HiPC 2011
- NASA employee of the year award, 1993
- Excellence in Teaching award, USC, 1984

== See also ==
- Nanostructure
- Nanotechnology
