= Avtar Saini =

Indian microprocessor designer (died 2024)

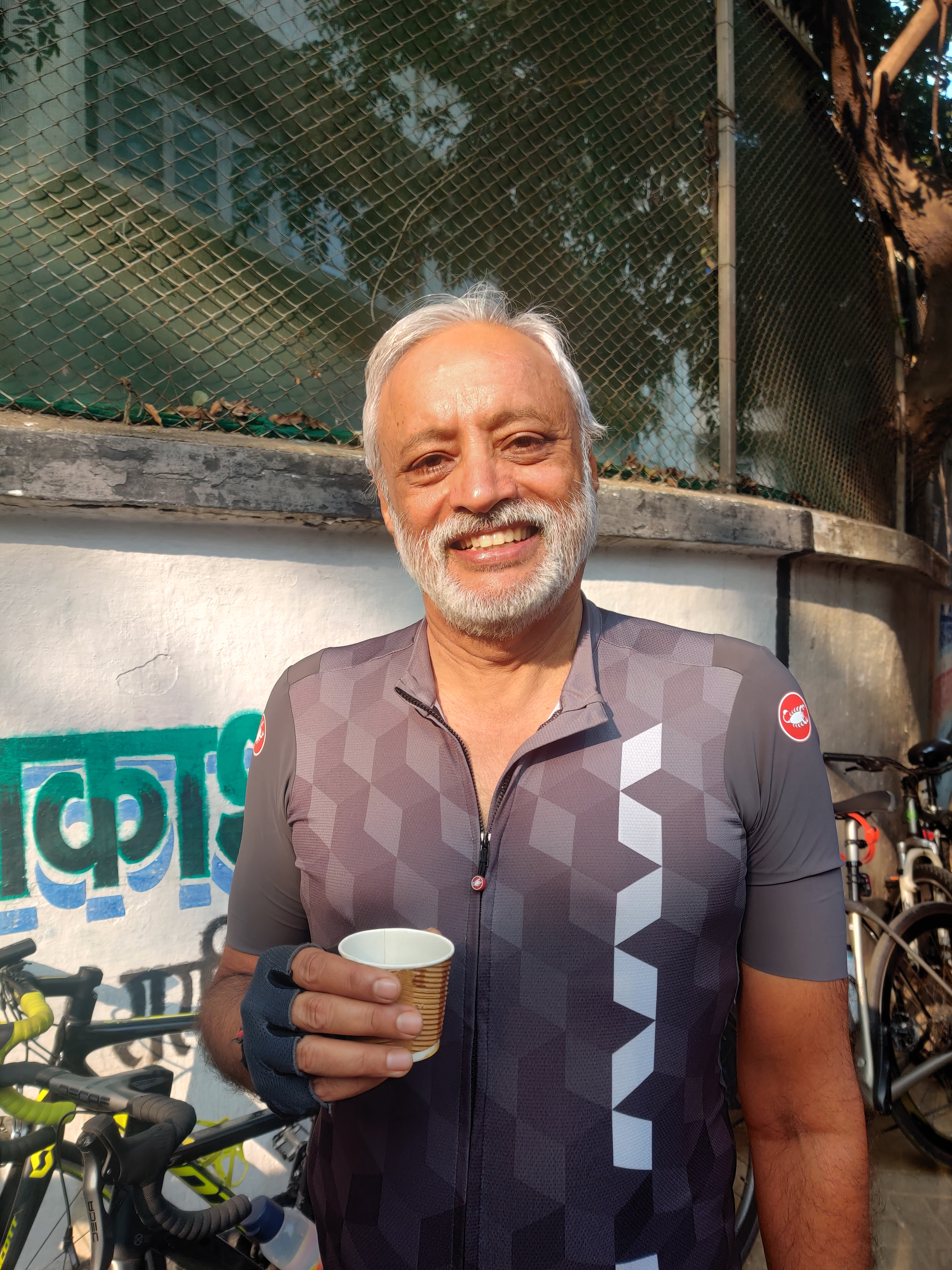
Saini in 2022

Avtar Saini (1956-28 February 2024) was an Indian microprocessor designer and developer who held patents related to microprocessor design. He was also a director for Intel's South Asia division. He was best known for his leadership role in the design and development of Pentium processor at Intel.

== Career and achievements ==
Saini held a bachelor's degree in electrical engineering from VJTI, Mumbai, and a master's degree in electrical engineering from the University of Minnesota.

In April 1982, he joined Intel as a product engineer in the area of magnetic bubble memories. Through the 1980s he worked as a circuit designer on the Intel 80386 and a micro-architect/logic designer on the 80486.

In 1989, he was promoted to co-lead the Pentium processor design team where he managed the design and its ramp into volume production. During the development of this processor, he was as the Logic Designer. In 1994, Saini was promoted to general manager of Intel's Santa Clara microprocessor division, where he managed Intel's next-generation 64-bit architecture microprocessor.

In May 1996, he moved to Folsom, California to head Intel's platform components division, where he was responsible for chipset and graphics solutions.

In September 1999, Saini relocated to India as Intel's director of South Asia. He left Intel in January 2004.

Saini held seven patents related to microprocessor design.

== Death ==
Saini died on 28 February 2024 when a taxi hit him from behind while he was cycling in Navi Mumbai.
