= Sikh–Sindhian relations =

Sikh Empire–Talpur dynasty relations
- Sikh Empire: Talpur dynasty

The Sikh–Sindhian Relations refer to the political and diplomatic interactions between the Sikh Empire under Maharaja Ranjit Singh and the Talpur Amirs of Sindh during the early nineteenth century. The correspondence began in 1802, initiated by the Amirs to foster friendly relations with the expanding Sikh Empire.The Sikhs initially harbored ambitions for Sindh, leading to multiple confrontations with the Talpur Amirs and the British, who were also keen on expanding their influence in the region and consequently interfered in these interactions.

During the diplomatic efforts, the Sikh-Sindhian Frontier experienced a series of armed conflicts between 1823 and 1838. These included punitive raids by the Baluch tribes allied with the Talpur Amirs, prompting several Sikh expeditions to the lower Indus led by the Multan Governor of the Sikh Empire to pacify them. None of these encounters turned into a full-scale war, mainly because the British intervened, viewing the Sikh advance as an obstacle to their plans for Sindh.

Through a series of treaties, notably the Indus Navigation Treaty of 1832 between the Sikh Empire led by Ranjit Singh and the East India Company under Lord William Bentinck, as well as the Tripartite agreement between Shah Shuja Durrani, Ranjit Singh, and Lord Auckland, the situation eased. British influence continued to grow in Sindh, while Ranjit Singh was content with the tribute levied upon the Talpur Amirs.

== Background ==
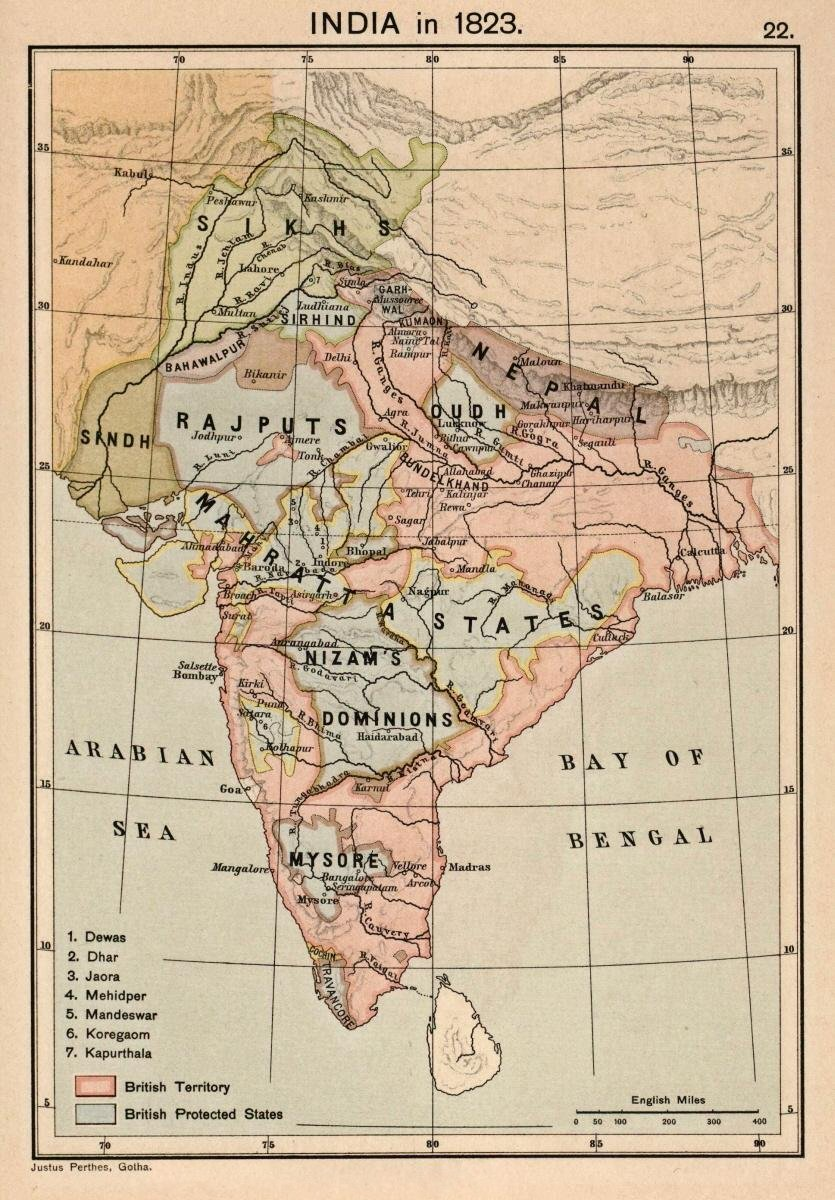
Map of India in 1823

The region of Sindh is located between the Makran coast to the west, the Rann of Kutch to the east, and stretches from Multan in the north down to the Arabian Sea in the south. Sindh was ruled by the Talpur Dynasty, who were of Baloch origin and came to power in 1783. Meanwhile, in the Punjab region, Ranjit Singh of the Sukerchakia Misl began uniting the Misls and incorporated them into his newly established Sikh Empire, based in Lahore. The first contact between these two regional powers was established in 1802, following Ranjit Singh's first Multan expedition. The Talpur Amirs, observing the expansionist Sikhs, sent their Vakils to earn their goodwill. In 1818, the Sikh conquest of Multan, followed by the subjugation of Bahawalpur, allowed Maharaja Ranjit Singh to expand his empire right up to Sindh's borders. This advancement alarmed the Amirs of Sindh, who feared the Sikhs might invade further into Sindh and seize several cities.

== Sikh Expeditions ==
Between 1823 and 1836, border disputes emerged between the Sikh Empire and the Talpur Dynasty, who were neighboring powers. The Balochis, nominally under the control of the Amirs of Sindh, carried out several raids into Sikh territory, escalating tensions between the Sikhs and the Amirs. The Sikhs used the raids by the Balochis as a justification to advance into Sindh.

=== Three Sikh Expeditions ===
To pacify the Balochi raiders, Maharaja Ranjit Singh launched his first expedition into the lower Indus in 1823 to punish the Balochis for attacking a Sikh outpost near Multan. According to historian Sethi, the real motive was to occupy Shikarpur. During this incursion, the Sikhs, personally led by Maharaja Ranjit Singh, advanced as far as Sultan Shahi. Along the way, they successfully subdued the Balochi tribes and collected tribute from them and the surrounding territories. The expedition was successful, and Ranjit Singh returned to his capital, Lahore. The Sikh expedition alarmed the Talpur Amirs, prompting them to send their envoys to Ranjit Singh's Darbar with gifts.

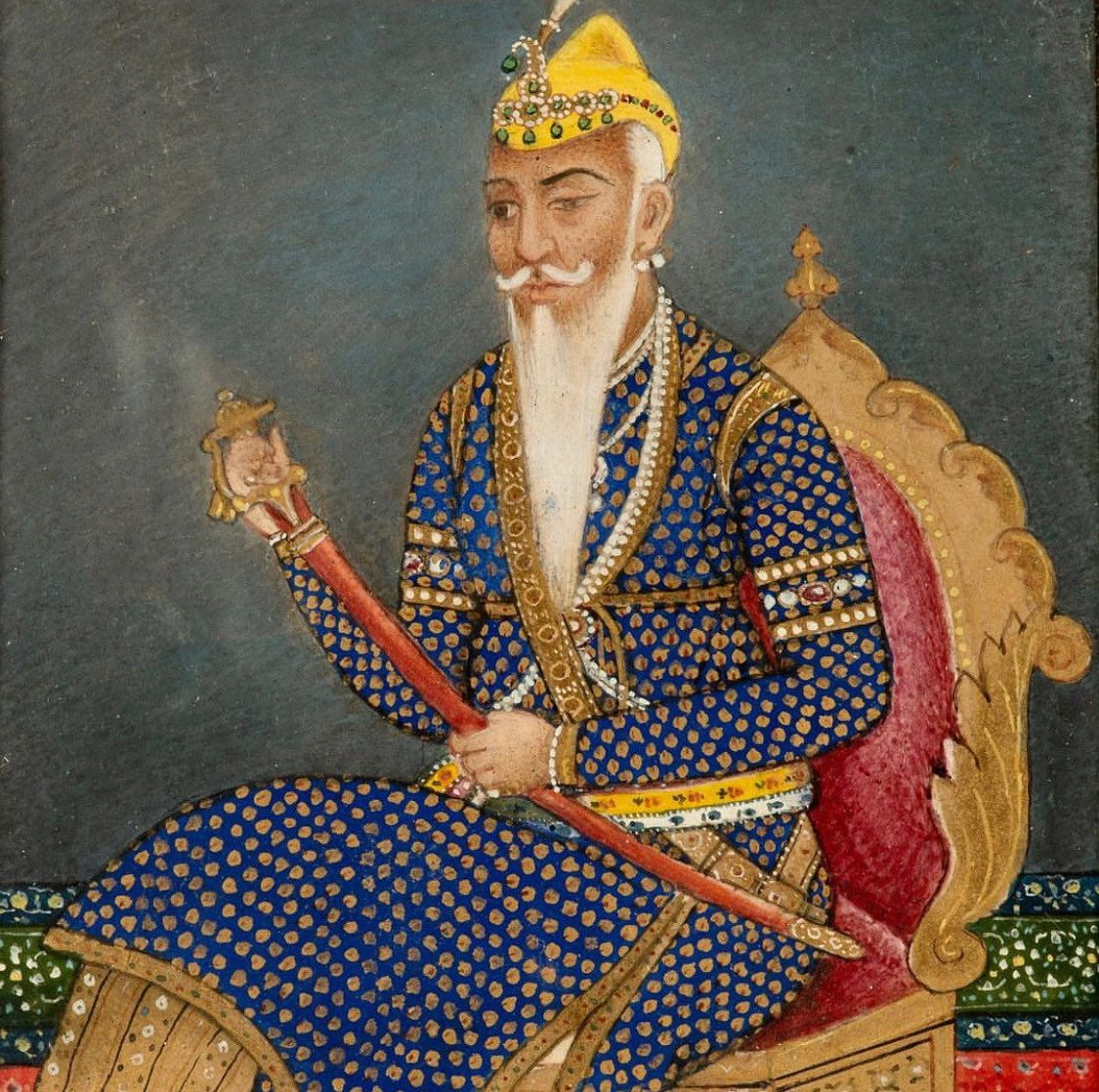
Painting of Maharaja Ranjit Singh

In October 1824, following Dushera, Maharaja Ranjit Singh led an expedition down the Indus to subdue the Balochis. He advanced to Bukkur before successfully returning to Lahore in December of the same year. In 1825, after Dussehra, Ranjit Singh led his third expedition to Sindh, but upon discovering that the region was plagued by famine, he returned to Lahore in November of that year.

=== Diplomatic exchange ===
In the winter of 1825, Maharaja Ranjit Singh dispatched an emissary to the Talpur Amirs of Sindh demanding the payment of tribute. The Sikh ruler argued that, having conquered much of the former Afghan dominions in northern India, he had inherited the rights and obligations that previously bound Sindh to Kabul. The Amirs dismissed this claim, arguing that their prior submission had been exclusively to the Durranis, though they did send Vakils with gifts for the Sikh ruler.

Despite the disagreement, both sides maintained diplomatic contact. The Amirs sent their vakils envoys to Lahore with presents, and by the late 1820s two permanent Sindhian representatives Darvesh Muhammad and Asa Nand, one Muslim and one Hindu were stationed at Ranjit Singh’s Darbar. They were granted a combined monthly allowance of Rs. 700, later increased to Rs. 1,000 in May 1831.

== British Intervention and Missions ==
British involvement with Sindh began under the Kalhoras in 1758. Ghulam Shah Kalhoro granted an English merchant named Sumption trade privileges. These included permission to open factories and to reside in Sindh. In 1809 the Talpur Amirs agreed that no person from France would be allowed to settle in Sindh. In 1820 a new accord required the Amirs to restrain Khosa and Baluch raiding into Company territory.

Through the 1820s the Company's political interest in Sindh remained limited. When European pressure eased, earlier arrangements fell into abeyance. From 1823, under C. M. Wade at Ludhiana, British officials watched Sikh troop movements while maintaining an outwardly Neutral stance toward Sindh.

=== Burnes mission ===
In 1830–1831, British interest turned toward the Indus River. Alexander Burnes travelled upstream from the Arabian Sea to northern Sindh to study the river. He found that the Indus had a steady current and sufficient depth for boats throughout its course. Burnes reported that trade could move easily along the river between the sea and the Punjab, and that the rulers of Hyderabad and Khairpur appeared ready to support such navigation. The mission increased British interest in the river and alerted british officials to the Sikh Maharaja's southern ambitions.

=== Rupar Meeting ===
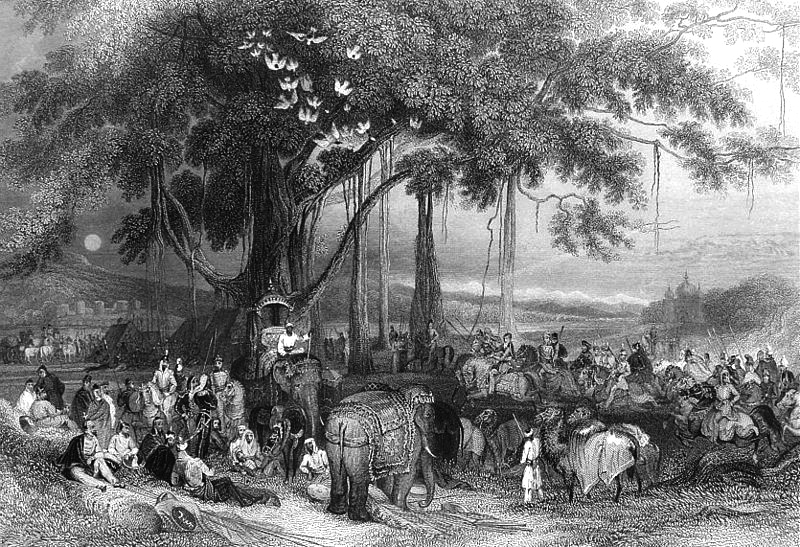
Runjeet Singh and his Suwarree. Maharaja Ranjit Singh, depicted on horseback, stands as the central figure, surrounded by the Sikh cavalry. The foreground features elephants and camels. Ropar, 1831.

In October 1831, Lord William Bentinck, the Governor-General of India, met Maharaja Ranjit Singh at Rupar on the Sutlej. The meeting, remembered for its splendour and ceremony, also carried important political undertones. During the discussions, Ranjit Singh raised the issue of Sindh, describing the Amirs as wealthy but militarily weak and referring to their obstruction of Burnes's passage up the Indus. He asked whether the British would approve of a Sikh expedition against them. Bentinck gave no direct answer. He had already authorised Henry Pottinger, the Company's resident in Kutch, to open negotiations with the Amirs for a commercial treaty concerning the Indus, and he chose not to reveal this to the Maharaja. Although cordial in tone, the meeting left Ranjit Singh dissatisfied. He received only a general assurance of friendship and no support for his southern ambitions.

=== Pottingers mission ===
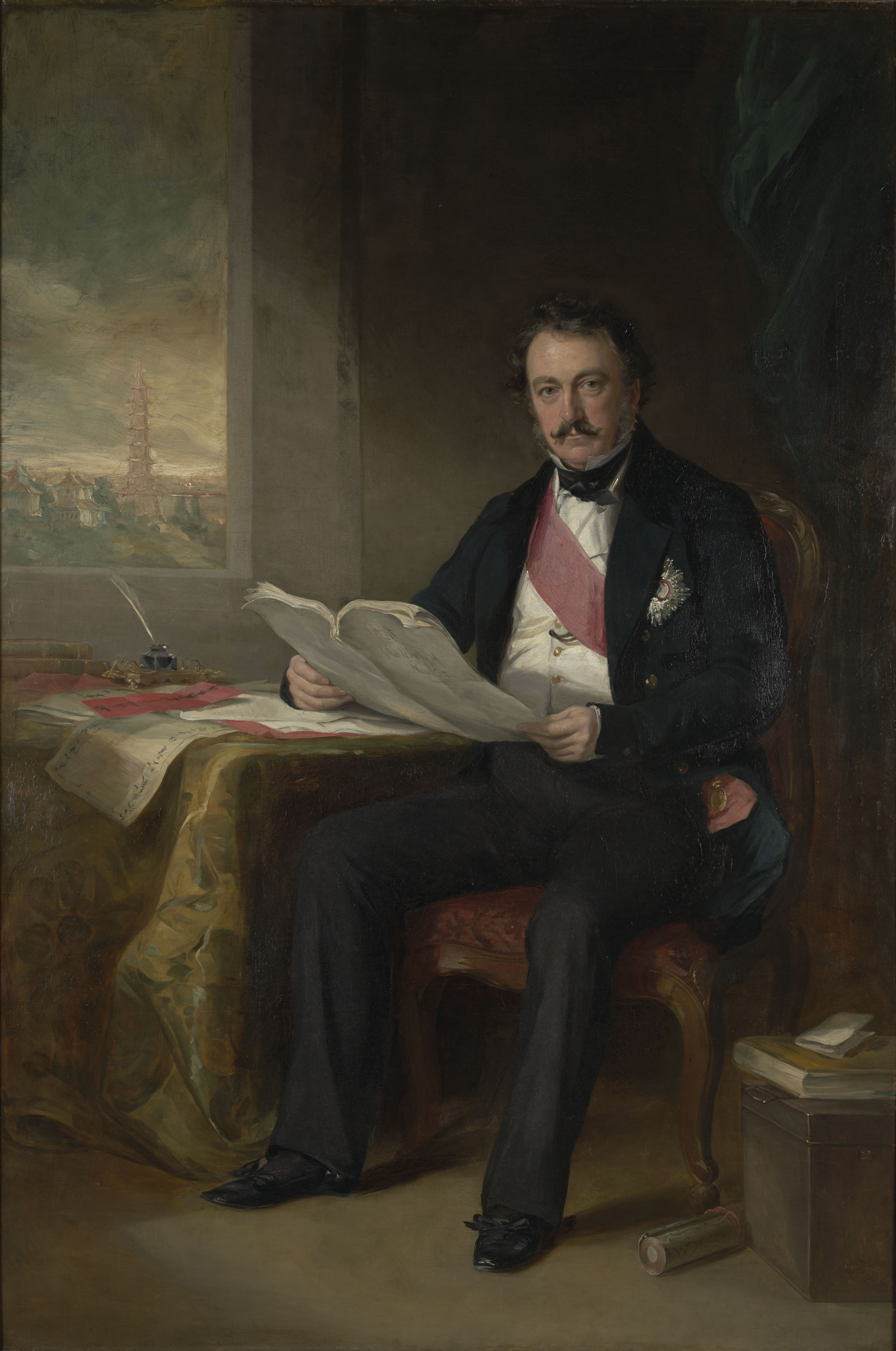
Henry Pottinger

Pottinger arrived in Sindh in late 1831. After prolonged discussions, he succeeded in concluding separate commercial treaties with the Talpur rulers. The Hyderabad treaty was signed on 20 April 1832 and ratified by Lord William Bentinck at Shimla on 19 June 1832. Complementary arrangements followed with Bahawalpur and the Sikh Empire, and on 24 December 1832 Ranjit Singh agreed to a tariff schedule governing river duties and customs collection. Although the Indus Navigation treaties soon proved commercially disappointing, its political impact was substantial. The treaties established a British foothold along the Indus and curtailed Sikh influence south of Mithankot.

=== Policy hardening by Auckland ===
Wade was instructed to reassure the Maharaja that the Company's activities in Sindh were confined to trade and not territorial expansion. To avoid confrontation, Ranjit Singh postponed his projected advance toward Shikarpur. Under Lord Auckland, appointed Governor-General in 1836, British policy hardened. Officials aimed both to prevent Sikh expansion along the Indus and to consolidate British influence in Sindh.

== Renewed Sikh-Talpurian dispute ==
The relations between the Sikh Empire and the Talpur Amirs of Sindh deteriorated in 1836 owing to the repeated raids of the Mazari and Bugti Baluch tribes. These groups occupied a wide, poorly defined tract between Kot Mithan and Amarkot, nominally within Sindh but largely beyond effective control. Their chief, Behram Khan Mazari, from his stronghold at Rojhan, frequently crossed into Sikh territory.

=== Sawan Mal's pacification of Rojhan ===
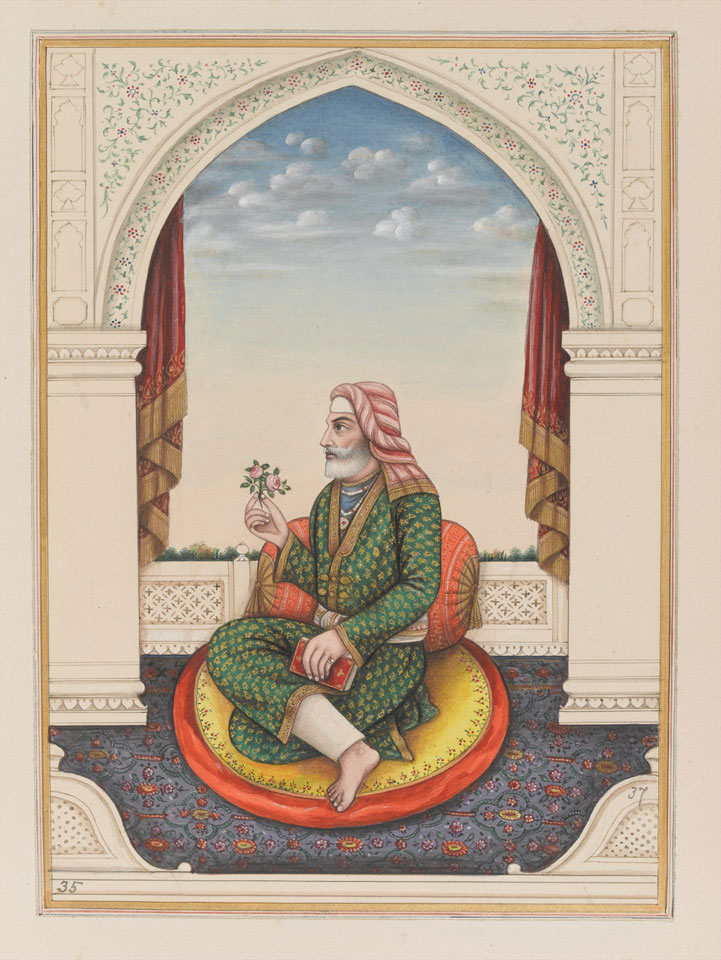
Diwan Sawan Mal

In November 1834, Diwan Sawan Mal Chopra, Governor of Multan, sent Sardar Hari Singh, the thanadar of Mithankot, to demand tribute from Behram Khan. The demand was refused, and Sawan Mal personally advanced against the Mazaris. By January 1836 he devastated their lands around Rojhan and forced the chief to submit, accepting a tribute of livestock and pledges of annual payment. The pacification was short-lived. Later that year, renewed incursions led by a follower named Nasur-ud-Din, said to be a relative of Syed Ahmad Barelvi, caused further unrest but Sawan Mal and his Sikh forces were able to expel him.

In July 1835, a Battle occurred between Behram Khan’s raiders and Sikh troops. During the engagement, the chief's mother-in-law, Jannat, was captured by the Sikhs. Maharaja Ranjit Singh demanded twenty-five camels as ransom Behram Khan immediately delivered twenty, and on 15 December 1835 she was escorted to Mithankot and released upon receipt of the remaining five camels.

=== Sikh–Sindhian Frontier Expedition (1836) ===
Believing that the Mazaris were aided by the Talpur Amirs, Maharaja Ranjit Singh ordered a stronger campaign. In early 1836, Maharaja Ranjit Singh ordered large-scale operations along the southern frontier. Kanwar Nau Nihal Singh was dispatched to Multan to coordinate with Dewan Sawan Mal Chopra and "exterminate the Mazaris". The local kardars of Mithankot and Multan were instructed to rally their troops under the Nau Nihal Singh's command. A fund of Rs. 60,000 was placed at his disposal for the campaign. At the same time, Kanwar Kharak Singh was directed to move against the renewed Mazari incursions and to advance his officers toward Shikarpur, so that the anticipated conquest could be attributed to him. General Jean-Baptiste Ventura led five battalions in support of the operation. According to C. M. Wade, Ranjit Singh's urgency was partly intended to pre-empt Shah Shuja Durrani, whom the Amirs had invited to Shikarpur for assistance.

Sikh–Mazari conflicts
Date	1834–1837
Location	Dera Ghazi Khan, Mithankot, Rojhan, Kin, and the Punjab–Sindh frontier
Result	Sikh victory
Territorial changes	Rojhan and Ken annexed to the Sikh Empire

Belligerents
Sikh Empire	Mazari tribe

Commanders and leaders
Ranjit Singh; Kharak Singh; Sawan Mal; Mul Raj; Abdur Rehman	Mir Bahram Khan Mazari; Mir Dost Ali Mazari; Maulvi Nasiruddeen

Strength
8,000 infantry 4,000 cavalry four cannons	12,000 fighting men

Casualties and losses
Unknown	11,856 killed or wounded

Before the Khalsa Army reached Multan, the Mazaris launched another raid on Mithankot in April 1836, carrying off considerable plunder. Diwan Sawan Mal Chopra counterattacked, killing a son of Behram Khan, and subsequently captured Rojhan. The Sikh forces then advanced toward Badauni, where Behram Khan had retreated, and proceeded to Ken, another Mazari stronghold defended by a Sindhian contingent. After a determined resistance, Ken fell to the Sikhs, and Ranjit Singh demanded Rs. 200,000 for its evacuation.

The defeat broke the Mazari resistance, and the campaign effectively ended their raids on Sikh territory. With the frontier pacified, Ranjit Singh shifted attention to the Talpur Amirs, accusing them of secret collaboration with the raiders. He demanded from their vakils the cession of Shikarpur and the payment of a tribute to Lahore. To enforce compliance, Sikh forces under Prince Kharak Singh were increased to about 8,000 infantry, 4,000 cavalry, and four guns, and the frontier post of Rukhan in Khairpur territory was occupied.

In response, the Talpur Amirs began mobilising their own resources. They assembled an army of roughly 10,000 horsemen and 45 guns, sought the assistance of Amir Dost Muhammad Khan of Kabul, and appealed to the British for mediation. Realising, however, that they were unable to resist the Khalsa Army effectively, the Amirs entered negotiations with Diwan Sawan Mal Chopra and haggled regarding the payment of a tribute of Rs 200,000 to secure the withdrawal of the Sikh forces from Rojhan.

=== British Mediation ===
The Sindhian appeal for British mediation in their dispute with the Sikh Empire received immediate attention from Lord Auckland’s government. At Fort William, officials recognised that the conflict between Ranjit Singh and the Talpur Amirs offered an opportunity to establish British influence in Sindh. In November 1836, Henry Pottinger was sent to Hyderabad with instructions to warn the Amirs that continued hostility with the Sikhs might endanger their rule, and to urge them to align more closely with the Company.

Pottinger proposed that the Amirs accept British protection in return for several conditions that a British force stationed in Sindh, a resident agent at Hyderabad, and all correspondence with Lahore to pass through British channels. Despite initial reluctance, the Amirs consented after being reminded of the Sikh threat. A provisional agreement was reached with Mir Noor Muhammad Talpur on 30 November 1836, and a formal treaty was signed on 20 April 1837. It pledged British mediation between the Amirs and Maharaja Ranjit Singh, established a permanent British minister at Hyderabad, and allowed the Amirs to post a vakil at Calcutta.

Ranjit Singh, informed of the arrangement, accepted British mediation, halted his advance on Shikarpur, and allowed Alexander Burnes to proceed up the Indus to Attock. The agreements secured peace on the Sindh frontier while marking the beginning of formal British ascendancy in Sindh.

=== Mazari revolt of 1837 ===
After mediation by the Talpur Amirs of Sindh, peace was concluded on terms by which Mir Bahram Khan and the Mazaris acknowledged the supremacy of Maharaja Ranjit Singh. Mir Bahram Khan later visited the Lahore Durbar on Ranjit Singh's invitation. Later in 1837, however, the Mazaris again rebelled against Sikh authority. Mir Bahram Khan gathered his tribesmen, and was joined by Maulvi Nasiruddin, who had been sent by his uncle, Syed Ahmad Barelvi, to assist resistance against the Sikhs.

The Sikh force, equipped with trained cavalry and artillery under Abdur Rehman, defeated the Mazaris and inflicted heavy casualties. Rojhan was retaken and completely destroyed. According to Sohan Lal Suri, Ranjit Singh ordered the guns of the Lahore artillery to be fired in celebration after receiving news of the victory.

Mir Bahram Khan died soon afterwards and was succeeded by his son Mir Dost Ali. After his accession, Mir Dost Ali again rose against the Sikhs and attempted to recover Rojhan, but Diwan Sawan Mal Chopra marched against him and forced the Mazaris to withdraw. A more lasting peace returned after Sawan Mal's death in 1844, when his son and successor, Mul Raj, gained Mir Dost Ali's support and reached an agreement with the Mazaris, who recognized Sikh suzerainty.

== Tripartite Treaty of 1838 ==
The Tripartite Treaty was concluded on 26 June 1838 between the East India Company, Maharaja Ranjit Singh, and Shah Shuja Durrani. Under Article 16, the Shah agreed to relinquish all claims of supremacy and arrears of tribute over the territories held by the Talpur Amirs of Sindh, on condition that the Amirs paid to him a sum to be fixed by the British Government. Of this payment, fifteen lakhs of rupees were to be transferred by the Shah to Ranjit Singh.

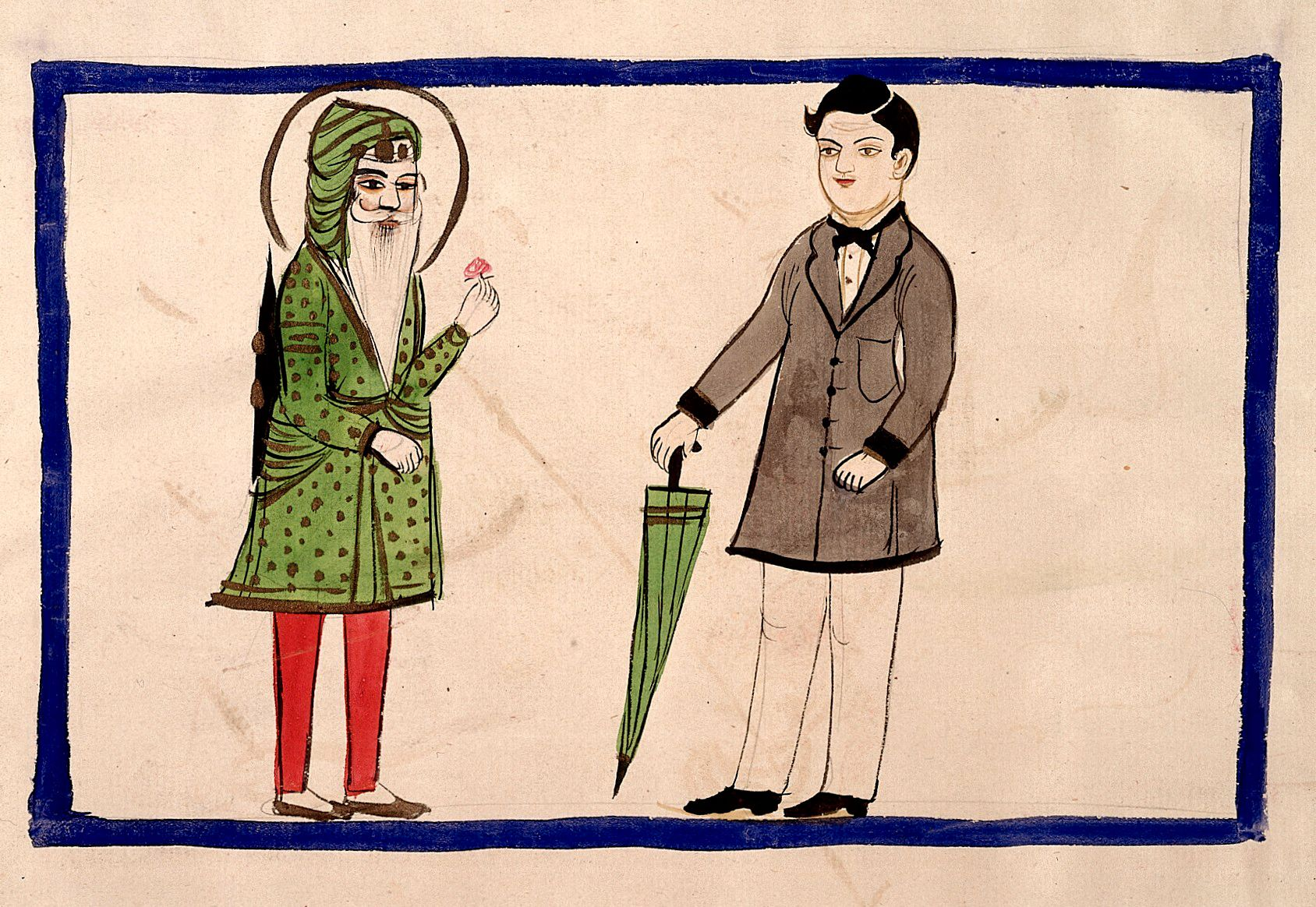
File:Watercolour painting of Maharaja Ranjit Singh (left) and George Eden, 1st Earl of Auckland (right)

The arrangement entitled the Sikh ruler to receive the amount either directly from the Amirs of Sindh or through the Shah, and upon completion of payment, Article 4 of the earlier treaty between Ranjit Singh and Shah Shuja (12 March 1833) concerning Shikarpur and adjoining lands on the right bank of the Indus was to be annulled. In this settlement, the British Government effectively acted as guarantor for the payment to the Sikh Empire.

While the Sikh Empire fulfilled its obligations under the treaty by cooperating in the British-sponsored restoration of Shah Shuja to the throne of Afghanistan, the Amirs of Sindh, though released from the Shah's suzerainty, delayed their contribution. Ranjit Singh subsequently directed Raja Dhian Singh to request Captain Wade to secure the payment from Sindh in accordance with the terms of the treaty.

== Modern evaluation ==
Historians differ in assessing Maharaja Ranjit Singh's policy toward Sindh. According to Hari Ram Gupta, Ranjit Singh's interest in Sindh dated back to his first campaign against Multan in 1802, when the Talpur Amirs sought friendly correspondence with him. After the Treaty of Amritsar (1809), he viewed Sindh as a natural extension of his dominion, though his expansion was restrained by British oversight. Gupta argues that Ranjit Singh missed a decisive opportunity to occupy Sindh in the 1810s, when Britain was preoccupied with wars against the Gurkhas, Marathas, and Pindaris, and European affairs limited its intervention in India.

Khushwant Singh observes that despite outward cordiality, Anglo-Sikh relations had grown strained during the late 1830s. British officials increasingly viewed the Punjab as a future acquisition, seeking to limit its strength while cultivating the Amirs of Sindh and Afghan rulers through treaties. The Sikh court, aware of British duplicity, attempted to counterbalance this policy by encouraging resistance among the Amirs and maintaining diplomatic contacts with other regional powers.

Meanwhile Historians such as R. R. Sethi and Bikramjit Hasrat note that Ranjit Singh justified his claim over Shikarpur and Sindh on the grounds that these territories had previously acknowledged Kabul’s authority, which he claimed to have inherited. However, the British Government disputed this interpretation of the 1809 Treaty of Amritsar, insisting it did not prevent Britain from forming relations west of the Indus. In diplomatic exchanges, British envoys denied the validity of Ranjit Singh's claims and positioned themselves as protectors of Sindh under the guise of mediation.

By 1838, the Tripartite Treaty had effectively settled the matter. The British guaranteed a payment of fifteen lakhs to the Sikh Empire, compensating the Maharaja for relinquishing his designs on Sindh. Hasrat concludes that Ranjit Singh achieved financial satisfaction.

== See also ==
- Sikhism in Sindh
