= Sikhism in Sindh =

Sikhism in Sindh سنڌ ۾ سک ڌرم
Regions with significant populations
- Shikarpur • Sukkur • Hyderabad

Religions
- Sikhism

Languages
- Sindhi • Punjabi • Hindi • Urdu

Sikhism in Sindh, or Sindhi Sikhs, is a minor religious affiliation, adhered to by 5,182 people or around 0.01% of the total population as per 2023 Pakistani census. The religion has a long history in Sindh, with the Udasi and Nanakpanthi sects playing a prominent role. In recent years, mainstream Khalsa Sikhism has made inroads. Local Sindhi beliefs and practices often blur the line between Hinduism and Sikhism, an example of religious syncretism. Sikhism was popularized in Sindh by the missionary work of Nanakpanthi traders and Udasi saints. Nanakpanthi and Udasi are both Sikh sects; a major difference is that Udasis adopt life-long celibacy, whilst Nanakpanthis marry and have children.

In the Sindh province of Pakistan, the Sikh marriages are registered under the Sindh Hindu Marriage Act of 2016. Sindhis (mostly those settled in Gujarat) are one of the largest groups to visit Kartarpur Sahib. Since 1947, a sizeable portation of Sindhi Sikhs migrated to the Republic of India, whilst some remained behind in Pakistan.

Sindhi Sikhs internally categorize themselves into different groups, such as Bandai, Nawabshahi, or Naichan, among others.

== History ==
=== Origins ===
Punjab and Sindh share geographic, linguistic, and cultural ties, with there being overlappings, Khushwant Singh characterizes this relationship as being marked by "both proximity and wariness". Thus, Sindh and Punjab both form a northwestern Indian space which is distinct from the Indian mainstream. Guru Nanak may have travelled through Sindh as he travelled from Punjab to the coast during his udasis (travels). It may be plausible that parts of northern Sindh, such as Sukkur and Shikarpur, became influenced by Guru Nanak during his travels, however there is a paucity of conclusive evidence and it cannot be determined if Sindhis converted to Sikhism at the time. The question of determining when Sindhis began converting to Sikhism is difficult as many Sindhi Hindus adopted Sikh beliefs and practices without "formalizing" a relationship with Sikhism nor shedding their old identity.

By the late 16th century during the guruship tenure of Guru Amar Das, territorial deputies or vicars known as a masand were established, including in Sindh. The Sindhi surname Masand originates from this event. Sikhism was initially a peaceful movement but was gradually martialized through the later gurus after Guru Arjan's execution, with a joint concept of sant-sipahi being practiced, however Sikhism in Sindh mostly continued following the sant side of Sikhism, however there are some exceptions with the martial sipahi side being evoked.

=== Spread of Sikhism ===
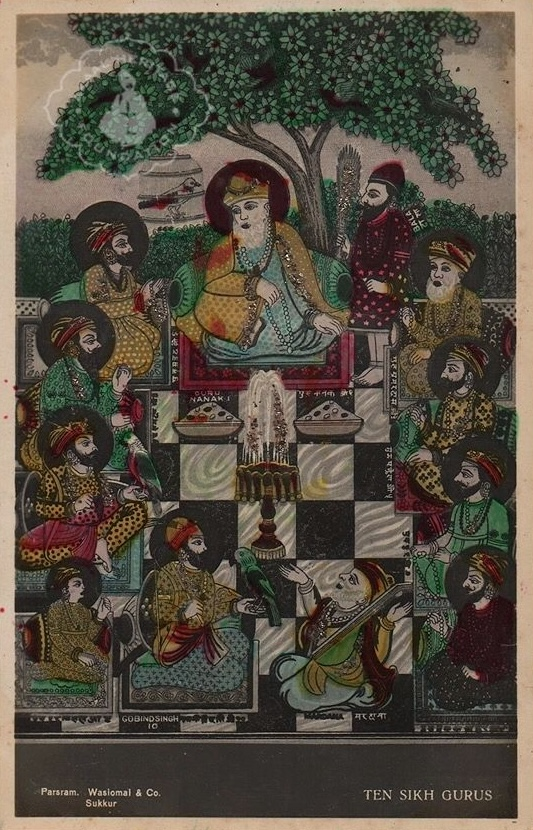
Postcard art print of the ten Sikh gurus, by Parsram Wasiomal & Co., Sukkur, Sindh, ca.1900's

The foundation of Sikhism in Sindh took firmer roots during the early 17th century. This was facilitated by a trade-network linking southwestern Punjab and Sindh and the ancient Indus River trade. The first arrivals were Nanakpanthi traders, who mostly drew from the Arora caste, with others being Khatris. Other scholars, such as Matthew Cook, stress upon the importance the Lohana caste played in the transmission of Sikhism to Sindh, as they made-up around half of the Hindu population of Sindh by the mid-19th century and were "in the orbit of Sikh cultural hegemony". Cook believes that during the 18th century, Punjabi migrants moved to Sindh, where they were absorbed by the Lohana community, and were responsible for the spread of Sikhism in the region. Scott Levi claims that during the decline of the Mughal authority and Afghan invasions of Punjab, firms operating in Multan in southern Punjab shifted their operations to Shikarpur in Sindh, making possible the spread of Sikhism. There exists a traditional story of Guru Gobind Singh recruiting followers from Sindh in the 17th century. After the death of his master, Guru Gobind Singh, in 1708, it is said Bhai Gurdas Singh traveled to Sindh, where he did missionary work spreading the tenets of Sikhism in the local area of Shikarpur. Traditional lore claims he lived to an impressive age of 150. His life is commemorated in the Khatwari Dharamsal of Bhai Gurdas in Shikarpur, Sindh.

There is a theory that when the Arabs conquered Sindh in 711, many Hindu refugees fled Aror and departed to settle in Punjab, later-on during the rise of the Kalhoras as independent rulers, there was a back-migration of the descendants of those earlier refugees, such as Lohanas, Bhatias, and Khatris, bringing Sikhism they had adopted in Punjab with them to Sindh. Sindhis may have been drawn to the sahaj teachings of Guru Nanak, which is described as a "method of gentle discipline". Another factor which aided the adoption of Sikhism in Sindh was the fact that Sindhi Hindus were followers of "mercantile pragmatism", which allowed for the absence of strict, rigid socio-cultural hierarchies involving caste and sect, which fit-in well with the egalitarian and universal message of Sikhism. Also, Sufism rather than Quranic Islam was prevalent in Sindh, which also influenced non-Muslims in the region.

These early Sindhi Sikh pioneers were differentiated from Khalsa Sikhs, as they did not place importance on maintaining uncut hair, donning the five Ks, nor did they adhere to the rehatnamas (codes of conduct). The success of the Nanakpanthis in spreading Sikhism in Sindh is attributed to their ability to adopt the local culture and language of the places they settled. The Nanakpanthis stressed upon the nirankar concept, a formless conceptualization of the divine.

The places of worship of Nanakpanthis in Sindh was originally called a tikana, with the gurdwara term not being used initially. The Udasis also established darbar centres in Sindh, such as the Sadh Belo complex, where heterodoxical practices and beliefs of ascetics were followed which were not ordained by orthodox Khalsa Sikhism. During unrest in Punjab during the 18th century, both Punjabi Sikh and Hindus migrants moved to Sindh, with many being traders and others being warriors. This group of migrants were mostly sehajdharis, some were Bandais whom were followers of Banda Singh Bahadur. The Sindhi Sikhs were categorized based on region, such Nawabshahi and Naichi.

In the early 19th century, the Sikh Empire of Punjab bordered the Talpur Dynasty of Sindh to the south. The Sikh Empire had conquered Multan in 1818, with Ranjit Singh having ambitions and designs to invade Sindh and seize Shikarpur afterwards, which was an economic centre. Ranjit Singh suggested an alliance to Shah Shujah Durrani of Afghanistan, proposing to split up the Sindhi territory gained by the proposed conquest between them. However, successful delays by the Talpurs and the arrival of the British in the area led to the abandoning of the plan.

=== Colonial period ===
Photograph of an Akali-Nihang from the Punjab in Sindh, ca.1862–72

By the late 19th century, Khalsa Sikhs had emerged in the urban areas of Sindh but remained a minority in the midst of heterodoxical Sikh groups. Thariya Singh (1826–1926) of Kandharan village was baptized into Sikhism in the 1870s and spent years prosletyzing Sikhism to local Sindhi Hindus, which led to the conversion of many. (Note: Thariya Singh's name is alternatively spelt as 'Tharia'.) Although Thariya was baptized into the Khalsa, he did not go against the syncretic practices of Sindh, which aided his success in winning over sehajdhari Hindu converts. He also popularized the practice of gurudino ("giving to the gurus"), whereby the eldest son of a Hindu family was raised and baptized as a Sikh, a practice which was also common in Punjab and Balochistan at the time. Thariya promoted the singing of devotional music, langar communal kitchens, Udasi ascetic practices, congregational dancing in the style of Sufis, the recitation of extracts of Hindu scriptures, respecting holymen from various sampradayas, acceptance of practitioners of the local folk Islam of the region, celebrating gurpurabs, and holding kirtan musical performances during amrit vela ("ambrosial time").

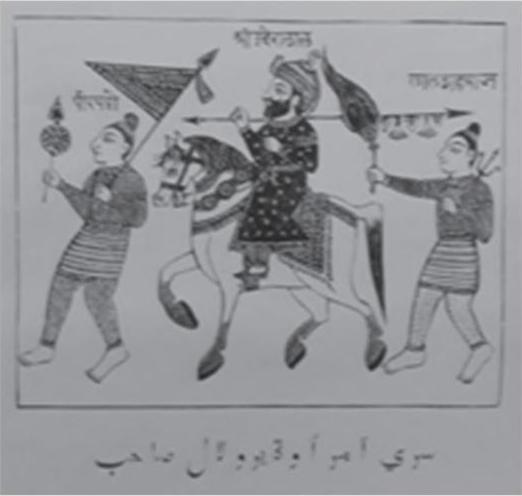
Equestrian depiction of Udero Lal (Jhulelal), alongside Pir Patho and Lal Shahbaz, published in 'Janam Sakhi Shri Amar Udero Lal Sahib' (Karachi, 1923). Jhulelal is venerated by many Sindhi Sikhs.

The Singh Sabha movement in Punjab and its mission of promoting a monolithic Sikh identity did not impact Sindhi Sikhs much, failing to leave a lasting change on the beliefs and practices of Sindhi Sikhs, thus religious syncretism between Sikhism, Islam, and Hinduism continued in Sindh and religious differentiation and boundaries did not materialize as it did in Punjab during the late 19th and early 20th centuries. Outside of Punjab, boundaries between Sikhs and Hindus still remained undefined and blurry. Sindhi Sikhs did not adopt the Sikh Marriage Act of 1909, preferring to maintain their syncretic ways. Thus, Sindhi Sikhs worshipped local Indic deities, such as Jhulelal, donned a tilak on their forehead, visited dargahs of regional Sufi pirs, and venerated dehdhari gurus (living gurus), which contrasted with Khalsa Sikhs of the Punjab, who had become the dominant face of Sikhism by the early 20th century. Due to these factors, it is difficult to categorize what is Hindu and what is Sikh in pre-partition Sindh. Meanwhile, religious boundaries in neighbouring Punjab had been drawn through the Singh Sabha movement, the Sikh Gurdwaras Act of 1925, and SGPC, as per Harjot Oberoi.

During the period of Sikh migration during the colonial-period, diasporic Punjabi Sikhs and Sindhis often formed close-bonds with one another in their new countries of residence, especially in southeast Asia, due to the affinities that Nanakpanthi Sindhs had toward Sikhism, allowing them to attach to the Punjabi Sikhs and working jointly together on causes, also worshipping together in the same religious spaces. An example of this colonial diasporic bond is how the Sindwork firm Wassiamall Assomull donated funds toward the construction of a gurdwara in Manila in the Philippines in 1933.

The Japji and Sukhmani prayers of Sikhism were translated into Hindi by the local Singh Sabha outfit of Sukkur. However, the Hindus and Sikhs of Sindh were still cognizant of themselves being two different groups, yet minor economic and social conflicts between them did not push them to antagonizing each-other and breaking-off ties. Thus, there were no major conflicts between Sindhi Hindus and Sikhs during the 1930s and 1940s, even as the Rashtriya Swayamsevak Sangh began to gain ground in Sindh at the time. Yet again, this contrasts with the situation in Punjab, where relations between Sikhs and Hindus had soured during the colonial-period.

=== Partition of India ===
During the partition of India in 1947, Sindh had initially been calm between July and August 1947 following the partition violence in neighbouring Punjab but Sindhi Sikhs were fearful they would suffer the same fate as their Punjabi co-religionists in West Punjab. Sindhi Sikhs were specifically targeted by Muslims due to the role Punjabi Sikhs played during the violence in East Punjab. Sindhi Sikhs motivations to migrate to India were dominated by fear of violence and retribution, in-contrast to the motivations of Sindhi Hindus, which differed.

Many Sindhi Sikhs left for the Republic of India in large groups through ships via ports in Karachi to Bombay and Gujarat and also by trains via Hyderabad to Rajasthan. Sindhi Sikhs and Hindus followed the same refugee routes to India. Some rich Sindhi Sikh refugees travelled by plane to Delhi during the partition. The modes of transportation of Sindhi Sikh refugees differs from that of Punjabi Sikh refugees fleeing West Punjab, as Sindh did not experience human-columns journeying to their new homes. There exists accounts of Sindhi Muslims helping Sikhs and Hindus escape to India in safety. When they arrived in India, the refugees often took-up residence in the abandoned dwellings formerly owned by Muslims, who had made the reverse journey of fleeing to Pakistan. Some of the Sindhi arrivals forcibly repossessed the homes of local Muslims who had remained. The administrations of Maharashtra, Gujarat and Rajasthan, and Delhi provided shelter for the Sindhi refugees in the form of refugee camps. Sindhi Sikh refugee arrivals via train in Pali dispersed to other parts of Rajasthan, namely Beawar, Jodhpur, Ajmer, Kota, Bikaner and other towns.

The Sindhi refugees were often discriminated by their new neighbours, thus forming ghettos. One of these ethnic ghettos formed was Ulhasnagar. Sindhi Sikhs and Sindhi Hindus often congregated together in this early-period of post-independence India.

=== Post-1947 ===
The initial 1947 refugee wave was followed by another wave in the 1950s of Sindhis coming to India from Pakistan, however the second wave was due to different motivations based around economic and marital factors.

In 1952, a Devanagari transliteration of the entire Guru Granth Sahib was published by Sindhis in India, specifically by Jethanand Lalwani. Up until Operation Blue Star in 1984 and the aftermath, it was common for diasporic Sindhi Hindus to share gurdwaras with mainstream Sikhs in cities like Jakarta and Manila. However, the practice of these different groups sharing religious spaces has since declined. The Sindhi Sikhs generally became disillusioned with the Congress Party after 1984. Some Sindhi Sikh families were targeted during the 1984 anti-Sikh pogroms in Delhi.

In 1988, the first issue of the Directory of Sindhi Sikhs of Ulhasnagar was published. The directory records the names and surnames, alongside paternal names, of all the Sindhi Sikh members of the Guru Nanak Darbar of Ulhasnagar. It was followed by later issues published in 1992, 1998, 2001–02, and 2009, which were updates to the directory. Jaspirat Singh, son of Meharvan Singh, is the current head of the Guru Nanak Darbar of Ulhasnagar. This Sindhi Sikh organization practices unique traditions, such as kaladhaga (a black, talisman thread said to ward off evil from black magic and witchcraft) and Ichhpuran Diwas (day of wish fulfillment, carried-out twice a year where token payments and gift exchanges occur with a forty-day uninterrupted reading of the Sikh scripture).

Recently, there has been a newer trend of Sindhis adopting Khalsa-orientated Sikhism and rejecting the traditionalist and syncretic Nanakpanthi and Udasi sects. These Sikhs call themselves gursikhs and only pay obscience to the Guru Granth Sahib. According to Sindhi Sikh scholar Jasbirkaur Thadhani, there has been a shift in recent times amongst the Sindhi Sikh community away from Sindhi-ness and toward the Khalsa, manifested in the changing of surnames, as an example.

In January 2023, controversy occurred due to tensions between Nihangs from Punjab and Sindhi Sikhs in Indore, Madhya Pradesh over the practices of venerating the Guru Granth Sahib in the presence of idols. In the aftermath, Sindhi groups forfeited ownership of fifty copies of the sacred Sikh text to local gurdwaras due to claims of intimidation directed at them by the Nihangs. Another report claims a higher figure of ninety-two copies being given over to gurdwaras by the Sindhis. The Shiromani Gurdwara Parbandhak Committee later met with Sindhi Sikh representatives on the issue. In the aftermath, the SGPC leader Harjinder Singh Dhami put out a statement that the Sindhi connection to Sikhism should remain intact and that no Sindhi organization should be coerced into giving-up a copy of the Guru Granth Sahib. The matter was later discussed at the Akal Takht.

In India, Sindhi Sikhs continue to practice religious syncretism, such as in the case with the Guru Nanak Darbar of Ulhasnagar, however they face pressures from Punjabi Sikhs to adopt the hegemonic beliefs and practices of formalized Sikhism as followed in Punjab. Punjabi Sikhs have labelled the Guru Nanak Darbar as being a dera and not a gurdwara, due to these differences.

Sindhi Sikhs in India today live in dispersed communities around the country, being highly urbanized. They maintain social and business relations with Sindhi Hindus but marriages across the religious divide have been declining in recent times. There is a trend of Punjabification of Sindhi Sikh marriages, folk-songs, greetings, and procreation rites in present-day India, due to the pressures placed on the community to assimilate to the mainstream Punjabi Sikh culture prevalent in India, causing a loss of authentic Sindhi traditions.

== Sects ==
=== Udasis ===
Sindh has a large number of people who may be best described as Udasis. The area of northern Sindh was especially influenced by Udasipanth. The Udasi temples of Sindh are known as darbars. It is said that Sri Chand himself visited Thatta in Sindh, where a darbar commemorates his stay. Sri Chand travelled to Sindh in the second half of the 16th century during the reign of the Tarkhan dynasty. He established a dhuni (campfire) at Rohri and another at Faqir Jo Goth, the latter of which is around 5 kilometres from Thatta.

After the passing of Gurditta, the second Udasi leader, the leadership passed to four preachers, with Bhai Almast being one of these four. Almast travelled to Sindh, where he conducted missionary activities and successfully converted many Sindhis to the Udasipanth. His place of residence was at Rohri, at the dhuni established by Sri Chand. Those newly converted appended Ram or Das to the end of their names. The mahants (who appended the prefix Bava or Bao, meaning "ascetic" at the beginning of their names and refer to their title of leadership as Gadhisar) of the Baba Sri Chand Darbar (colloquially known as Raj Ghaat) in Faqir Jo Goth, such as the first mahant, Bava Balkram Das, conducted missionary activities in the area and faraway (even as distant as Nepal) as did his successors. His two successors, Bava Pooran Das and Bava Lachman Das, were not only missionaries but also masters at hathi yoga. Sikhism became popularized in Sindh due to the missionary works of these Udasi saints. Udasi temples in Sindh typically houses both the Guru Granth Sahib as well images of various Hindu deities. There is said to be an Udasi temple dedicated to a saint in every town and city of Sindh. During the reign of the Talpur Mirs of Khairpur (1783–1955), many Udasi darbars were constructed and Udasi saints were accepted to settle in the state.

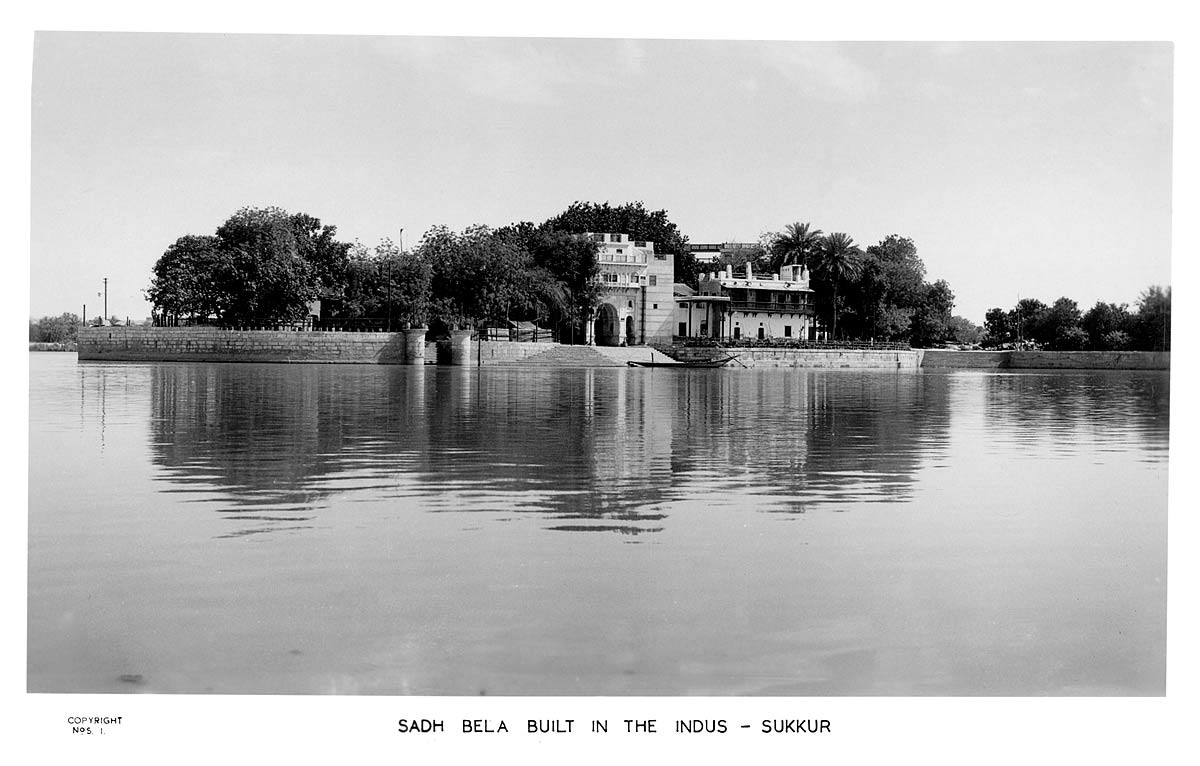
Photograph of the Sadh Belo complex in Sindh, ca.1940

A darbar at Godhu Shah in Khairpur (known as the Godhu Shah Darbar, Nanga Darbar, or Gurpota Darbar) is believed to have been founded by a grandson of one of the Sikh gurus (Gurpota) whom became an Udasi under the guidance of a mahant, it is associated with the Nanga sect of Udasis. Another Udasi saint who spread the faith in Sindh was Rai Sahib Gokal Singh, who established a darbar in Gokalpur Kot in Garhi Yashin. Baba Wasti Ram, an Udasi saint, established a darbar in Garhi Yasin town. Baba Wasti Ram and his successors, Baba Khushi Ram Sahib (a talented mystic), Baba Agya Ram (established a darbar in Aurangabad village), and Baba Piyara Ram (established in a darbar in Maari village), spread the Udasi teachings in the Shikarpur area. One prominent Udasi saint, Bankhandi, originally from either Nepal or near Delhi, was the founder of Sadh Belo in Sukkur, Sindh in 1823.

In recent times, veneration of the folkdeity Jhulelal has crept into the practices of Udasi darbars in Sindh. The liberal attitude of Sindhi Muslims may have helped the Udasis take root in Sindh rather than being pushed out on the basis of religious intolerance and persecution.

The most well-known Udasi darbars of Sindh are:

- Baba Bankhandi Darbar at Sadh Belo, Sukkur
- Baba Sarup Das Darbar (alias Halani Darbar) at Naushero Feroz
- Khushi Ram Darbar at Rohri
- Samad Udasin at Shikarpur
- Chhat Darbar at Shikarpur
- Wadi Darbar at Pir Jo Goth
- Jumna Das Darbar

=== Jagiasi ===
The Jagiasis are a Sikh sect cognate with the Udasis, whose founder is attributed as being Baba Lakhmi Das, the younger son of Guru Nanak. They were prevalent in Sindh, with their principal places of activity being Khairpur, Hyderabad, Halani, and Kandyaro. The followers of this sect were similar to Udasis, mixing in syncretic Hindu rituals, however unlike the Udasis they did not remain celibate but instead lived the life of a householder, marrying and having children. They did not usually practice the Sikh baptism, thus were not Khalsa Sikhs but instead were sehajdharis (gradualist Sikhs), who generally believed in the Sikh gurus and their teachings but many did not fully undergo the baptism, whilst others did maintain kesh and became Khalsa. They recite the Guru Granth Sahib and reject idolatry. Some append Singh to their name whilst others do not. The sect was prevalent in Sindh during the period of Baba Gurupat, a descendant of Guru Nanak, who lived around the time of Maharaja Ranjit Singh. Baba Gurupat went to Sindh with a letter of Maharaja Ranjit Singh and brought it to a local chief named Mir Sohrab Khan, with Baba Gurupat establishing many Jagiasi shrines in Sindh, known as tikanas (meaning "seat"). The last will of Baba Gurupat dates to 29 July 1857 and contained the signatures of many Jagiasi and Udasi figures of Sindh.

=== Nanakpanthis ===
Sikhs from the Punjab may have settled in Sindh during the 16th century to escape persecution, and they and their descendants gradually formed the basis of the Nanakpanthi community. Guru Nanak reportedly traveled through Sindh, reaching the Shikarpur area and impacting local spirituality. In the 1881 and 1891 Indian censuses, the Sindhi Hindu community could not decide to identify as Hindu or Sikh. Many Sindhi Nanakpanthis migrated to India during the 1947 partition, and are found in the states of Maharashtra, Gujarat, and Rajasthan. Many Sindhi Hindus in India and Pakistan admire Guru Nanak and regularly visit gurudwaras. A Sindhi temple typically houses the Guru Granth Sahib and images of Hindu deities. A Nanakpanthi temple is known as a tikano or tikana (a term also used for Sewapanthi temples). They are prevalent in Sindh, where religious syncretism of Hinduism and Sikhism is observed and religious boundaries become blurry and ill-defined. A tikana usually houses a copy of the Guru Granth Sahib alongside images of Indic deities. Most of the Sindhi Hindus can be categorized as Nanakpanthis, as they venerate Guru Nanak and the Guru Granth Sahib. Due to them not being bound by Khalsa norms, the Nanakpanthis of Sindh usually cut their hair, do not wear a turban, and also venerate local deities and Sufi and Hindu saints. However, Sindhi men cover the top of their head with a handkerchief within places of worship, tucked behind their ears to make it hold and not fall-off.

=== Sewapanthis ===
Bhai Kanhaiya was sent by Guru Gobind Singh to Sindh in-order to propagate the Sikh religion amongst the locals of the region. He is locally known as Khat Waro Bao or Khaatwala Baba in Sindh as he would preach whilst seated on a bed. The Khat Wari Darbar in Shikarpur is a Sindhi temple dedicated to him. After his passing, he was succeeded as head of the Sewapanthi sect by Bhai Sewa Ram. His successor would continue preaching and proselytizing Sikhism in Sindh. Many of the followers of the Sewapanthi sect were ethnic Sindhi Sikhs. A Sewapanthi temple is known as a Tikana (a term also used for Nanakpanthi temples). At a tikana is usually a copy of the primary Sikh scripture, Guru Granth Sahib, alongside images of Indic deities.

=== Bandais ===
A few of the Sikh refugees who fled from Punjab to settle in Sindh in the 18th century were Bandais, meaning followers of Banda Singh Bahadur.

== Demographics ==
=== Pakistan ===
According to the 1941 British India census, around 32,000 Sikhs lived in Sindh. Per community estimates published in a 2014 Karachi paper, there are approximately 10,000 Sindhi Sikhs in Pakistan. As per the 2023 Pakistani census, Sikhism is adhered to by 5,182 people or around 0.01% of the total population of present-day Sindh province.

=== India ===
A 2009 household survey counted 20,000 Sindhi Sikhs in India. A 2016 paper estimated the number of Sindhi Sikhs in India to be between 18,000 and 20,000.

== Language ==
Sindhi Sikhs speak Sindhi and often Punjabi as well. Some who moved to Punjab following partition were influenced to give-up their native-language and speak Punjabi instead. Due to the prominence of Gurmukhi in Sikhism, many Sindhi Sikhs are proficient in the script.

== Public and scholarly perception ==
Sindhi Sikhs are often met with confusion from others about their identity, as Sikhs are associated with Punjab in popular imagination and not Sindh. Some Sindhi Sikhs have been asked if they are converts to Sikhism from unknowing questioners. Studies on the experience of Sindhi Sikhs have been limited and they have seldom been taken into account in works on the 1947 partition, the Sindhi community, nor Sikhism. Sindhi Sikhs are often treated as an "extension of Sindhi Hindus", thus explaining their seeming omission in scholarly works, which focuses on Sindhi Muslims and Hindus. Scholars of Sikh studies have also neglected the internal diversity of the Sikh community, leading to the neglect of non-mainstream groups, instead focusing on Sikh spiritual authority and the Sikh past, and the form of Sikhism in Punjab.

== Relation with Hinduism ==
Sindhi Hindus tend to hold Guru Nanak's teachings in special regard. According to Daniel Gold, Hinduism in Sindh has been influenced by Sikhism and by mystical Islam, leading to the uniqueness and peculiarities of Sindhi Hindus in contrast to other populations of Hindus. Examples of these unique practices which differentiates them from mainstream Hinduism includes sponsoring recitations from the Guru Granth Sahib (usually performed by Khalsa Sikhs) and chanting waheguru, which is a term for the divine associated with Sikhism. Some Sindhi Hindus have distanced themselves from veneration of Guru Nanak and the Guru Granth in modern-day India, wishing to be accepted as Hindus by their fellow co-religionists, believing that Nanak and the Granth are too associated with Sikhism.

== See also ==
- Sikh–Sindhian relations
