= Harand Fort =

- قلعہ ہڑند
- Interactive map of the Harand Fort area
- Former names: Harrand Fort; Hari Nand Fort

General information
- Type: Military fortification
- Architectural style: Sikh military architecture
- Location: Harrand, Rajanpur District, Punjab, Pakistan
- Coordinates: 29°28′00″N 70°03′00″E
- Current tenants: Government of Punjab (heritage site)
- Construction started: 15th century (first fortification, traditional)
- Completed: 1836 (current brick fort)
- Client: Diwan Sawan Mal

Design and construction
- Designations: Punjab Special Premises (1985)

Harand Fort (Urdu: قلعہ ہڑند, also spelled Harrand or Hari Nand) is a ruined fortress in the village of Harrand, near Dajal, Rajanpur District, Punjab, Pakistan. It stands on a high mound between the eastern foothills of the Sulaiman Range and the flood-plain of the Indus River, about twenty-five kilometres west of Dajal. Its strategic situation at the mouth of the Chachar Pass once enabled its garrison to watch the caravan and invasion routes that linked the Iranian plateau with the Indus valley.

== History ==
Local tradition attributes the earliest fortification to the Hindu ruler Raja Harnakish, who is said to have named the stronghold after his son Hari Nand; over time the toponym contracted to "Harand". The Persian epic Sikandarnāma places Alexander the Great at the site and recounts his legendary meeting and putative marriage with the princess Naushaba, although modern historians treat the anecdote with caution.

Surface archaeology suggests occupation at least from the fifteenth to the sixteenth century. During the early nineteenth century the Sikh governor of Multan, Diwan Sawan Mal, dismantled the earlier mud-brick enceinte and in 1831–1836 rebuilt the present baked-brick fort to curb the Baloch tribes of Pachad and to secure the Indus ferries.

In 1867, British troops fought Marri–Bugti irregulars beneath its walls; after annexation the fort served briefly as a colonial cantonment and later housed the Border Military Police posts.

The Government of Punjab placed Harand Fort on its list of protected Punjab Special Premises (Preservation) Ordinance monuments in 1985 and allocated ₨ 90 million for initial conservation in the 2018–19 Annual Development Programme.

A 2023–24 regional heritage survey again flagged the monument's archaeological value and recommended urgent structural consolidation. In December 2024, the provincial Department of Archaeology described Harand as “the last outpost of the twentieth satrapy of the Achaemenid Empire” while announcing a district museum at Rajanpur to curate finds from the fort and neighbouring mounds.

Commentators in the Urdu press have since invoked Harand Fort as a symbol of the district's neglected heritage and have called for wider cultural tourism along the Indus corridor.

== Architecture ==
Sawan Mal's reconstruction produced an almost circular yet technically hexadecagonal plan enclosing roughly fifty acres. The curtain wall, built of thin baked bricks set in lime-rich mortar, is about seven feet thick and still rises to twenty-two feet; sixteen solid bastions project at equal intervals of fifty-six metres, echoing the concentric design of early Arab garrison towns such as Baghdad and Takht-i-Sulaiman. The walls incline slightly inward as an anti-scaling device and formerly carried kiosks that have not survived.

Two arched gateways pierce the enceinte on the east and west. A broad earthen ramp leads up to the eastern gate, behind which guardrooms flank a large square courtyard bounded by Sikh-period barracks and British masonry stables. Within the fort a domed circular shrine, popularly identified as a Hindu temple, occupies the south-eastern quadrant; fragmentary column bases nearby indicate the footprint of a mosque or administrative hall probably inserted during the Sikh overhaul. Urban-Unit engineers measured the interior as roughly 350 × 310 feet and noted that the fort stands on a compacted mud-brick core thought to overlie earlier occupational layers awaiting systematic excavation.
