= Nanakpanthi =

Religious community in Pakistan and India

Nanakpanth ਨਾਨਕਪੰਥ
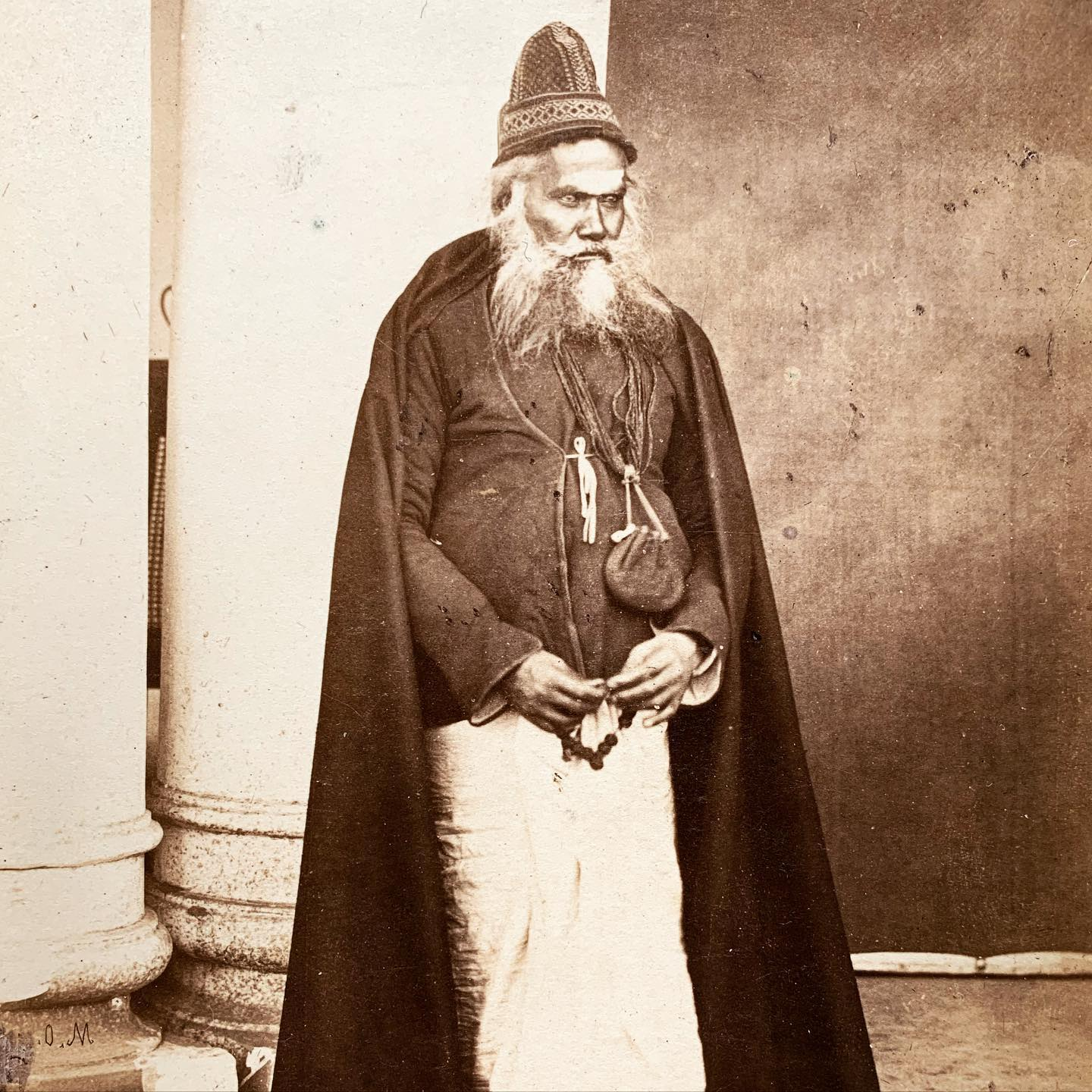
- Photograph of a Nanakpanthi by J. L. Lyell, c. 1860s

Total population
- Unknown

Founder
- Guru Nanak

Regions with significant populations
- India • Pakistan • Afghanistan • Nepal • Bhutan • Sri Lanka; Punjab • Sindh

Religions
- Sikhism • Hinduism

Scriptures
- Guru Granth Sahib • Janamsakhis

Nanakpanthi (Gurmukhi: ਨਾਨਕਪੰਥੀ; nānakapathī, "follower of the way of life of Nanak"), also known as Nanakshahi, is a syncretist movement which follows Guru Nanak (1469–1539), the founder of Sikhism, but without necessarily following his successors among the Sikh gurus nor formally identifying as being Sikh in terms of religious affiliation, as is the case with numerous Punjabi Hindus and Sindhi Hindus. "Nanakpanthi" as a term is often used to refer to non-Khalsa Sikhs, some of whom may belong to Udasi orders but others are affiliated with other heterodoxical, non-Khalsa sects. In the broadest sense of the term, it simply refers to a follower of Guru Nanak's teachings and practices.

== History ==
The term was first used in the Janamsakhis of the Miharvan tradition, and was later mentioned in the mid-17th century Dabistan-i-Mazahib.

== Description ==
Nanakpanthi references an early Sikh community which encourages any person, regardless of religious affiliation, to follow Guru Nanak's teachings of universal brotherhood, truth, love, tolerance, and compassion. It emphasises the oneness of Waheguru (the creator of the universe). According to Amardeep Singh, the term Nanakpanthi is more properly a historical umbrella term that is applicable to a number of religious sects and can be found amongst different socio-cultural groups, such as the following:

- Nanakshahis
- Rababis (Muslims)
- Bandais
- Udasis
- Nirmalas
- Gulabdasis
- Ramdasis
- Kukas
- Suthrashahis
- Sindhis
- Balochis
- Pashtun Hindus
- Biharis
- Oriyas
- Assamese
- Sikligars
- Punjabi Hindus
- Sehajdharis
- Keshdharis
- Patits
- Khalsa

== Distribution ==
=== Punjabi Hindus ===
==== Estimates ====
Today, some Punjabis adhere to elements of Sikhism despite being Hindus. They generally do not have beards or wear a turban, unlike Amritdhari Sikhs.

There is no data about the number of Nanakpanthis; worldwide, there are estimated 25 to 30 million Sikhs. Millions of others also venerate the 10 Sikh Gurus and follow the teachings of Guru Granth Sahib without adhering to a Sikh religious identity: (Note: According to Karnail Singh Panjoli of the Shiromani Gurdwara Parbandhak Committee) at the time of the 1891 census in British Punjab, out of the estimated 1,8 million Sikhs nearly a third were Hindu Nanakpanthis, but in later British censuses the "Hindu" and "Sikh" identities would become separate and Hindu Nanakpanthis would be classified as Hindus, no more as a Sikh sub-group.

A number of ethnic groups and sects in India follow the teachings of Guru Nanak and visit gurudwaras, in addition to worshiping Hindu deities at mandirs. The Indian government considers them Hindus for census purposes. A number of ethnic Punjabis who are Hindu, especially in Indian and Pakistani Punjab, Delhi, Haryana, Rajasthan, Chandigarh, Jammu and Uttarakhand, have continued other religious practices in spiritual kinship with Sikhism.

==== Perception by Sikhs ====
Nanakpanthi, as a label referring to the selective, personal following of Guru Nanak to the exclusion of his successors, was criticised by mainstream Sikh writers such as Bhai Gurdas.

=== Punjabi Muslims ===
Cultural anthropologist Haroon Khalid wrote that after the partition of India, a few Punjabi Muslims regularly visited Guru Nanak's shrine in Kartapur Sahib and made offerings; they continued to do so despite the shrine's dilapidated condition and its harboring of smugglers and drug addicts.

Descendants of Bhai Mardana, a Muslim companion of Guru Nanak, reportedly follow a syncretic tradition of Sikhism and Islam. Mardana's descendants performed kirtans in gurdwaras before the partition.

=== Sindhi Hindus ===
==== Before partition ====
Sikhism was popularised in Sindh by the missionary work of Udasi saints. Nanakpanthi and Udasi are both Sikh sects; a major difference is that Udasis adopt life-long celibacy, whilst Nanakpanthis marry and have children. Sikhs from the Punjab may have settled in Sindh during the 16th century to escape persecution, and they and their descendants gradually formed the basis of the Nanakpanthi community. Guru Nanak reportedly traveled through Sindh, reaching the Shikarpur area and impacting local spirituality. In the 1881 and 1891 Indian censuses, the Sindhi Hindu community could not decide to identify as Hindu or Sikh.

==== India ====
Many Sindhi Nanakpanthis migrated to India during the 1947 partition, and are found in the states of Maharashtra, Gujarat, and Rajasthan.

==== Pakistan ====
Many Sindhi Hindus in India and Pakistan admire Guru Nanak and regularly visit gurudwaras. A Sindhi temple typically houses the Guru Granth Sahib and images of Hindu deities.

== Places of worship ==
A Nanakpanthi temple is known as a tikano or tikana (a term also used for Sewapanthi temples). They are prevalent in Sindh, where religious syncretism of Hinduism and Sikhism is observed and religious boundaries become blurry and ill-defined. A tikana usually houses a copy of the Guru Granth Sahib alongside images of Hindu deities.

== Gallery ==
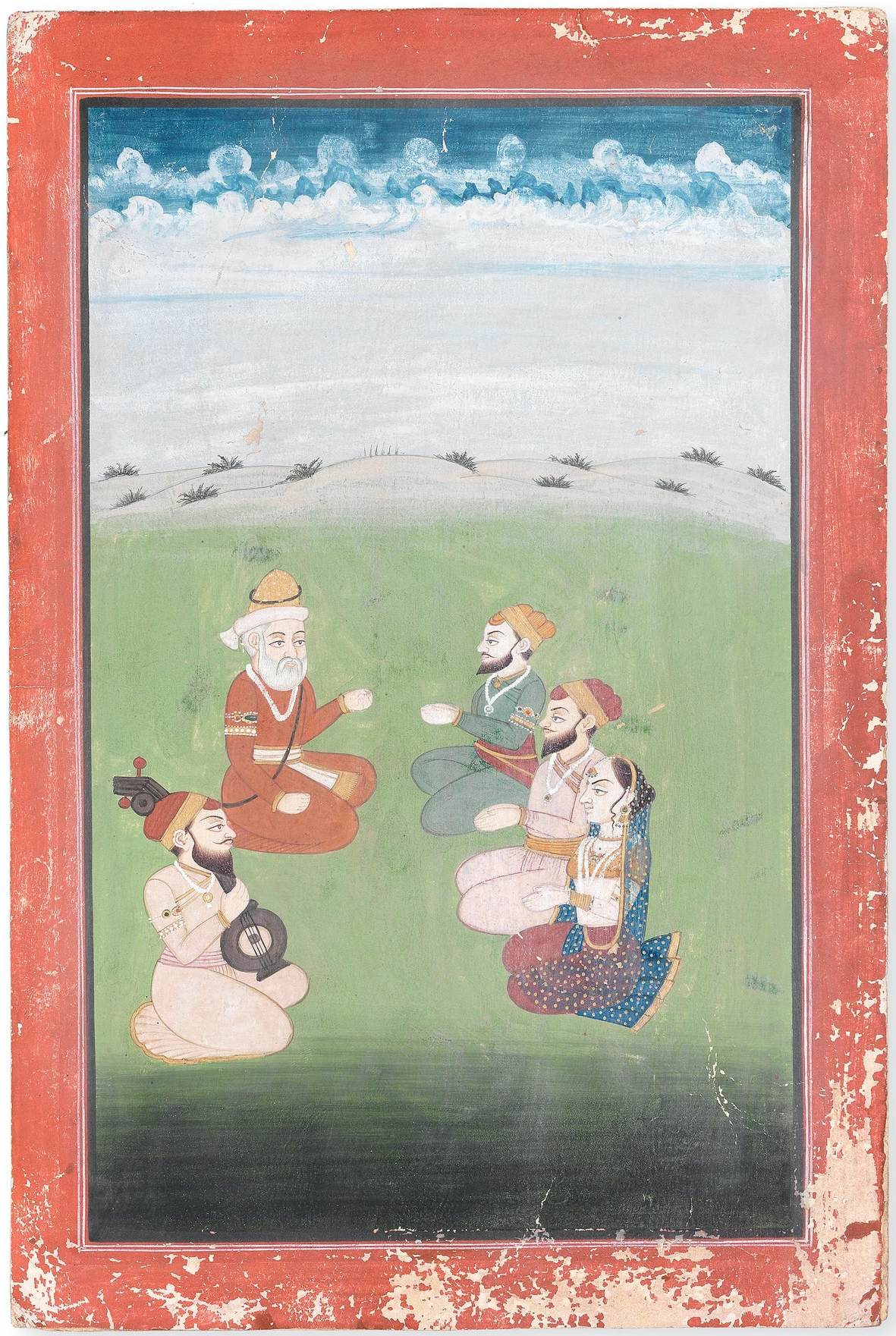
Guru Nanak and Bhai Mardana with three devotees, from a series of Janamsakhi paintings

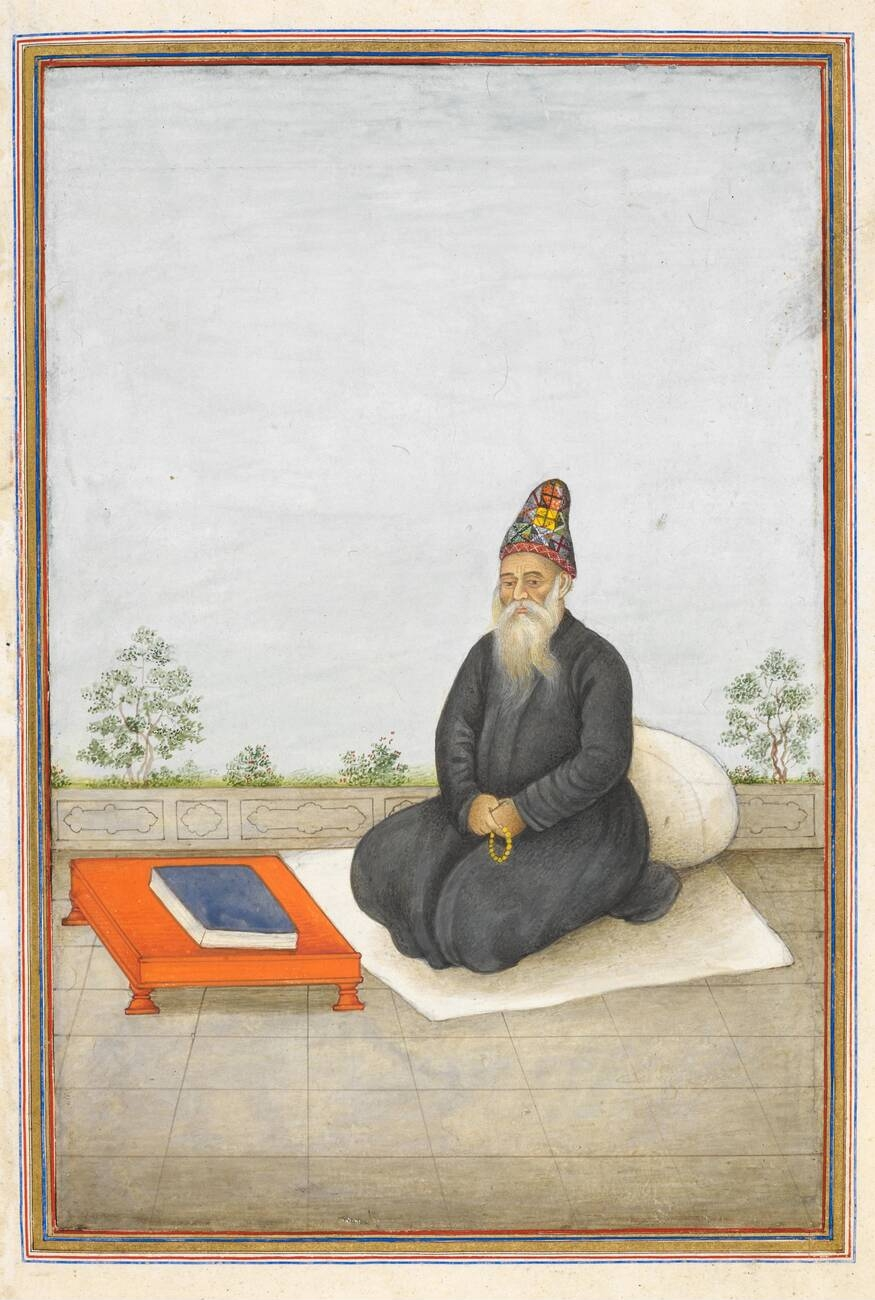
A Nanakpanthi, c. 1825

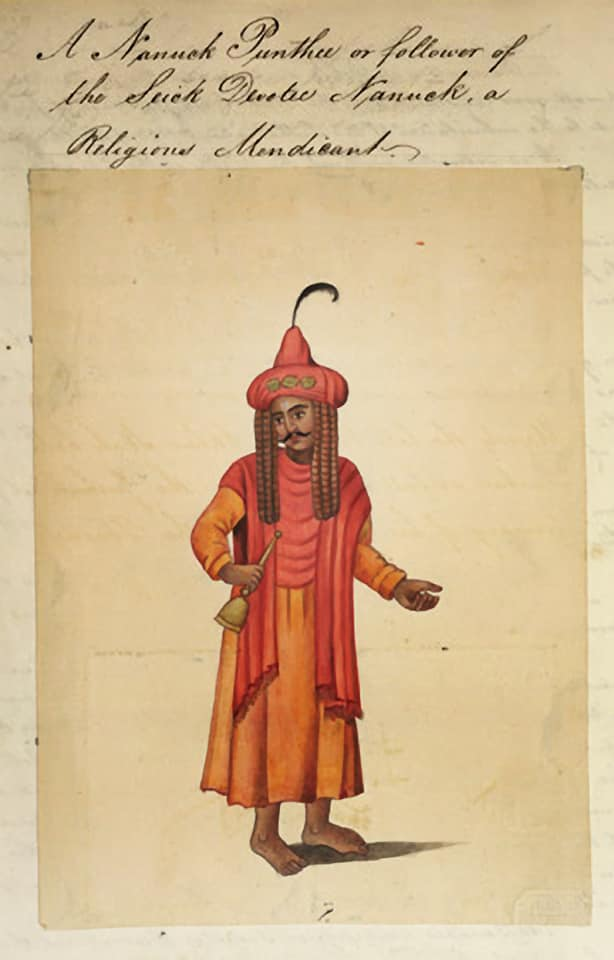
Sketch of a Nanakpanthi

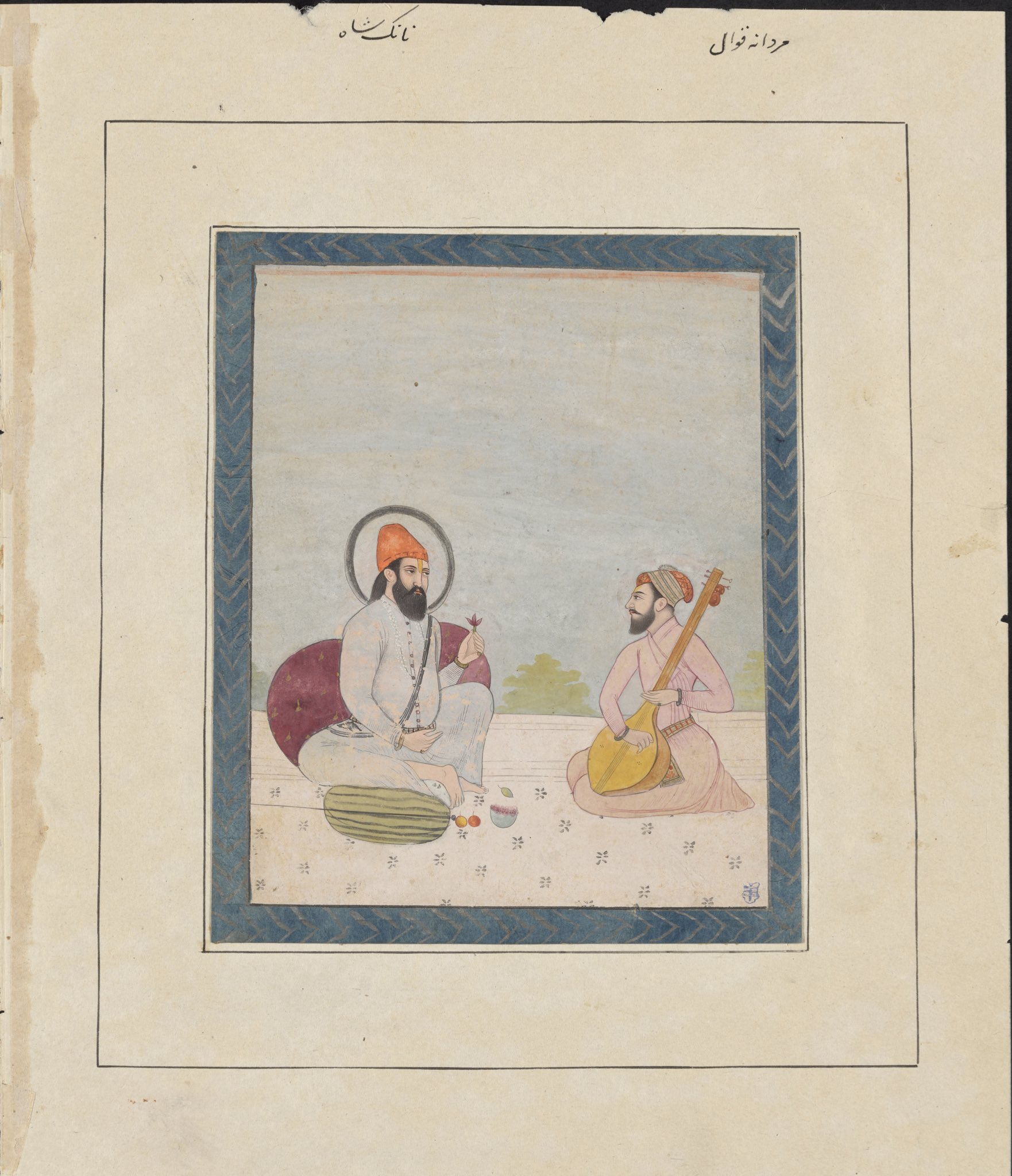
18th- or 19th-century Nanakpanthi depiction of Guru Nanak and Bhai Mardana

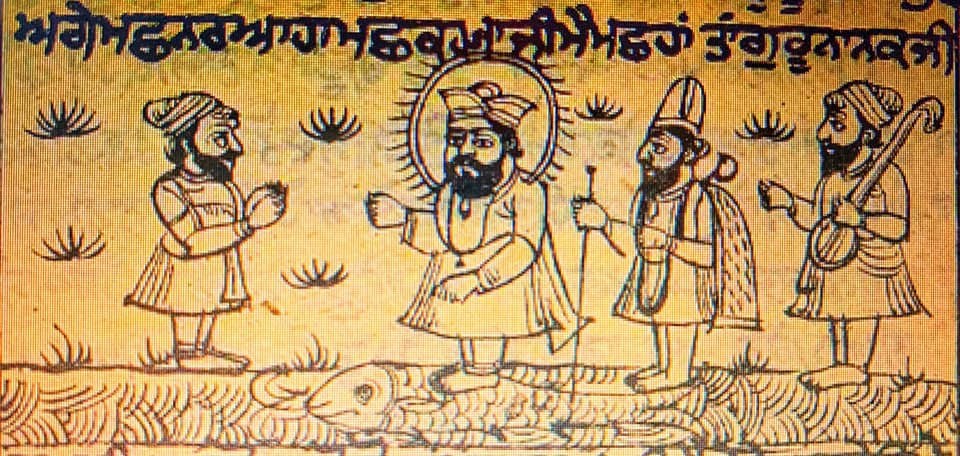
Guru Nanak riding a fish, 19th-century art, possibly from Sindh

== See also ==
- Sadh Belo
- Sri Chand Darbar
- Sindh
- Sects of Sikhism
