= Nanua Bairagi =

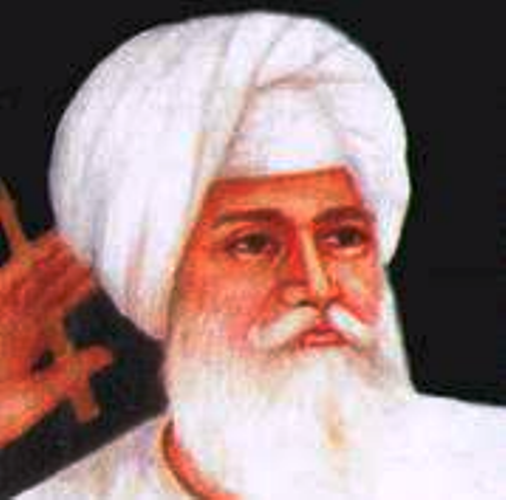
Nanua Bairagi, renowned mystic, humanitarian and Sikh warrior. He was a mystic poet and close associate of sikh gurus. Bhagat Nanua was a reputed Saini of the 17th century

Nanua Bairagi, (~17th–18th century) also known as Nanua Bhagat and Jamala Singh, was a renowned mystic, humanitarian and Sikh warrior of Punjab.

== Nanua as a humanitarian and spiritual mentor of Bhai Kanhaiya ==
Nanua was also the spiritual mentor of Bhai Kanhaiya, who in turn started Sewapanthi mission .

== Nanua as a poet-mystic ==
As a Darbari Kavi, or court poet, of Sikh gurus, his poetry left an imprint on the poetry style of Bulhe Shah. One of his famous hymns is given as follows:

I am Naught, O Lord, Thou art All!

I have seen all cloth, each shred,

To find all textures the self-same cotton.

Rama's light of love falls over all:

Fear not then dreadful Kala.

Rama runs through every nerve,

And Sohang, Sohang cry the pores!

I am naught, O Lord, Thou art All!

Sohang is apabransha of Upnishadic Soham (Sanskrit) which means "I am He". This is also termed as mahavakya in Upnishads and represents final union or gnosis of soul with Brahman, or the over-soul.

It is thus clear that Nanua's poetry synthesized both Vedantic and Sufi monisms into distinctly Sikh devotional practice, informed by direct discipleship and service of Sikh masters. Which speaks volumes about his stature as a poet and his place among the preeminent Sikh mystics whose place in Sikhism is second only to ten Sikh Gurus.

== Nanua as a close associate of Sikh gurus ==
Bhagat Nanua was a reputed Saini of the 17th century and Guru Tegh Bahadur is said to have had a great regard for him. Throughout his life he rendered his valuable services to Sikh Guru. He enjoyed the privilege of having close relationships with 8th, 9th & 10th Sikh Gurus. At the time of 8th Guru's death in Delhi, he arranged the cremation & later carried Guru ji's bone urn to Kiratpur Sahib. From there, along with Guru's family members he reached Baba Bakala as indicated by the 8th guru. After the cremation ceremony of 9th guru, he remained in the company of his master on various teaching missions. At the time of the last voyage of Guru Tegh Bahadur ji to Delhi, he accompanied the convoy. After the martyrdom of the Guru & Sikhs, he arranged their cremation. He along with Bhai Jaita and Bhai Uda had found and carried Guru Tegh Bahadur's severed head to Anandpur Sahib.
