= Sewapanthi =

Traditional Sikh sect

Sewapanth ਸੇਵਾਪੰਥ
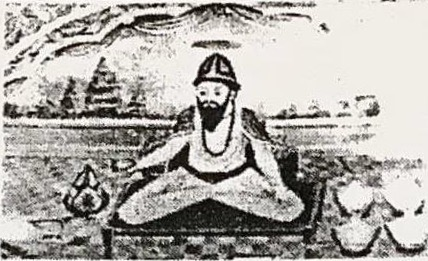
- Fresco depicting Bhai Kanhaiya seated on a terrace leaning against a bolster with an inscription above his head from Sri Khat Wari Darbar, Shikarpur, Sindh.

Founder
- Bhai Kanhaiya

Regions with significant populations
- Punjab • Sindh

Religions
- Sikhism

Scriptures
- Guru Granth Sahib

Sewapanthi (Punjabi: ਸੇਵਾਪੰਥੀ; meaning "fellowship of service" or "path of service"), alternatively spelt as Sevapanthi, and also known as Addanshahi, is a traditional Sikh sect or order (samparda) that was started by Bhai Kanhaiya, a personal follower of the ninth Sikh Guru, Guru Tegh Bahadur. The order is focused on the welfare and altruistic service of others. Kanhaiya was instructed by the Guru to go out and serve humanity, which he did by establishing a dharmasala in the Attock district of Punjab and serving indiscriminately. Sewa Panthis are also known as 'Addan Shahis'. This name is derived from one of Bhai Kanhaiya's disciples, Addan Shah.

== History ==
=== Origin ===
Guru Tegh Bahadur had a follower known as Kanhaiya Lal (also spelt as 'Ghaniya'), a Dhamman (Dhiman) Khatri who was born in 1648, in a town called Sohadara, now in Pakistan. Kanhaiya was of a religious-inclination since a young age and met the Sikh guru multiple times at Anandpur when he was ten-years-old and sixteen-years-old. Being very inspired by the guru's mission, Kanhaiya decided to dedicate himself to his service, even neglecting getting married because he thought it would take away time that could instead be spent on serving the guru. He served in the langar and became a drawer of water to the Guru's horses. The Guru gave Kanhaiya a seli topi as a reward. Kanhaiya accompanied Guru Tegh Bahadur when he was touring the eastern regions of the Indian subcontinent. Kanhaiya, who is noted for being humble, wore simple clothes that he made himself. Bhai Kanhaiya was the founder of the Sewapanth order.

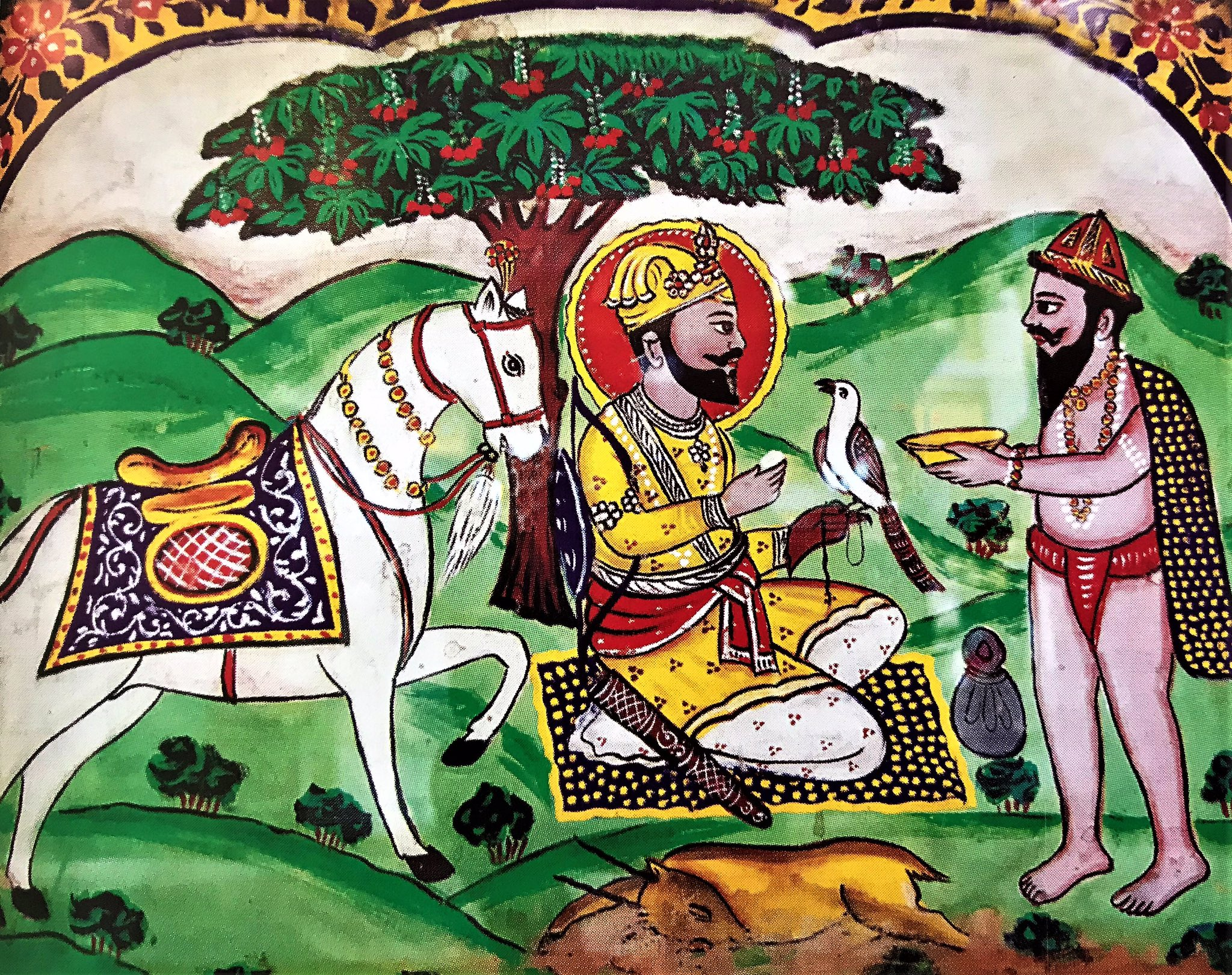
Fresco depicting Bhai Khanaiya meeting Guru Gobind Singh from Sri Khat Wari Darbar, Shikarpur, Sindh

Once the 10th Guru, Guru Gobind Singh, had ascended to the gurgaddi, Bhai Kanhaiya began to follow him. Allegedly, Guru exempted Kanhaiya and his followers from military duty and told him to carry on performing the duty allotted to him by his reverend, Guru Tegh Bahadur, of serving all living beings.

In the Battle of Anandpur (1703), Bhai Kanhaiya served water indiscriminately to wounded soldiers in the battlefield, including the opposition, consisting of enemy Pahari forces, Mughal forces of the Sirhind Sarkar, and Gujjars and Pathan irregulars. For this act, angry Sikh warriors accused him of treason brought him before the Guru. When he asked him why he was helping the wounded enemy, Kanhaiya replied that he could not distinguish between friend or foe, as he only saw Waheguru in all. The Guru was very pleased, and not only did he order Kanhaiya to continue, but also gave him a medicine chest as a gift. He then blessed him, saying after him shall be a Sikh order. He was also gifted a bed and handkerchief by the guru. After this, Kanhaiya collected a band of service-minded Sikhs.

During the evacuation of Anandpur in 1705, Kanhaiya became lost from the guru while the flooded Sirsa river was being crossed. Kanhaiya began wandering in the Malwa region, coming upon a Bairagi sadhu near Jagraon told him where Guru Gobind Singh had gone.

=== Later Mughal and Afghan era ===
After the invasion of Ahmad Shah Abdali in 1757, the Sewapanthis were able to spread out more and become popular, founding their dharamshalas across India. Some prominent Sewapanthi figures of this era include Aya Ram, Bhai Ranga, Daya Ram, Bhai Dayal, Bhai Soma, and Paras Ram. Paras Ram was a cripple (known as a pingla) and founded a Sewapanthi institution in Jangi Shiva Bazaar in Amritsar. The Sewapanthis continued to service the Sri Darbar Sahib in Amrisar even during the anti-Sikh persecutions under the tenure of the governor Zakariya Khan by lighting its internal lamp. The langar hall at the Golden Temple's construction was supervised by Sewapanthi saints.

=== Modern-era ===
Jawahar Singh of Mitha Tiwana was a Sewapanthi who was active from 1900–1950, being succeeded by Nischal Singh, who remains active in Jagadhri, Haryana. A prominent Sewapanthi scholar in the 20th century was Sant Pandit Nischal Singh, who died in 1978. Traditionally Sehajdhari Sikhs, nowadays many Sewapanthis are becoming Khalsa Sikhs. The Sewapanthis are extremely small in number and barely exist today.

== Philosophy and practices ==
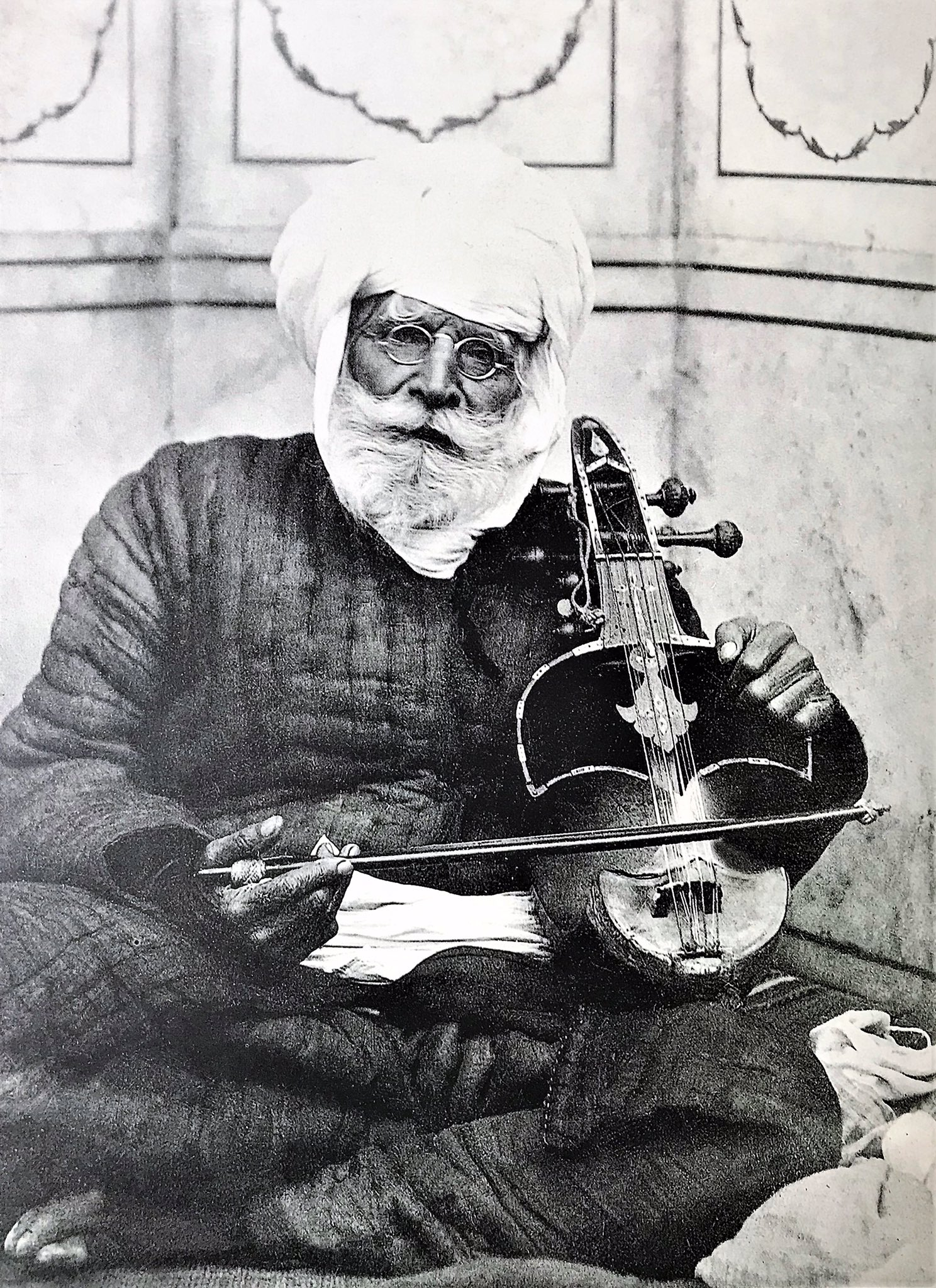
A photo of the famous hazuri ragi, Baba Sham Singh Sewapanthi

The main focus of the sect is on the selfless service to others, hence their name. They believe that selfless service to others, based upon mutual respect and love, is a way of salvation and enlightenment by overcoming one's own inherent selfishness. Traditionally, Sewapanthis do not live the life of a grishti (householder), but remain celibate. They dedicate their whole lives for sewa, or selfless service for the panth. They typically do not engage in begging or relying on alms/offerings for their survival. Instead, they tend to construct good and sell them to support themselves, as taught by Aya Ram to his disciple Dharam Das.

The Sewa Panthis are pacifists. Though they do not say it is wrong for a person to defend themselves, Sewapanthis themselves desist from all forms of violence. They refuse to harm other forms of life in an aspiration to become the epitome of shaant ras, and to remain in sattva guna. Despite this, they do not entirely detach themselves from the martial spirit expounded upon by Guru Gobind Singh. They support, in principle, the necessary violent actions required of the Khalsa for the protection of Dharma. As such, many Sewapanthis foregoe the pahul, or initiation into the martial Khalsa order. Many Sewapanthis were Sahajdhari in their observance and therefore did not keep kesh (unshorn hair). This allowed them to escape a lot of the persecution that more identifiable Sikhs faced. Whilst Sewapanthi saints are said to have an aversion towards womankind, they are known to assist women in distress.

The Sewapanthi Sikhs usually wear pure white clothes, and keep kesh (unshorn hair), the Sewapanthi figures Sewa Ram and Addan Shah never cut their hair. They have often had their deras and dharamsalas located in places like Punjab, Pakistan, and other with Muslim majority populations. Many of the followers of the sect were ethnic Sindhi Sikhs.

== Literature ==
Shabad (Sikh hymn) in the handwriting of Sant Sham Singh Addanshahi

This sect was responsible for preparing the ink used to write manuscripts of Sikh scriptures back in the time when such scriptures were written out by hand manually before the introduction of mass-printing. The ink prepared by the sect was known as "Roshanai" or "Addanshahi" ink.

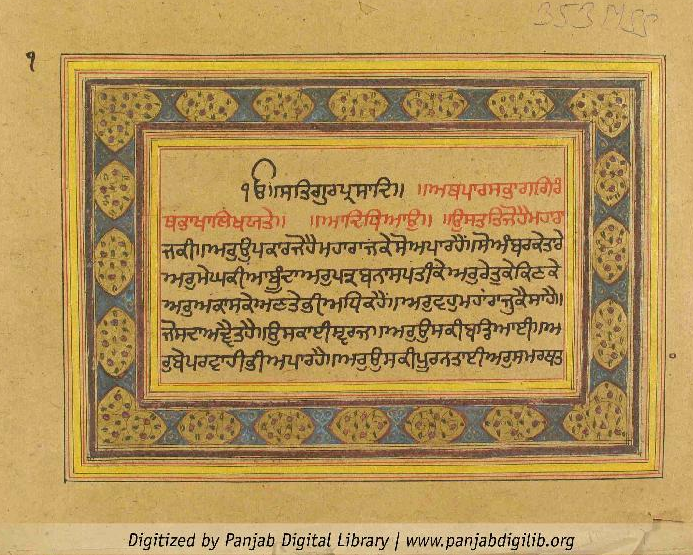
Gurmukhi translation of Imam al-Ghazali's Alchemy of Happiness, known as the "Paras Bhag". It was translated by Sewapanthi sadhus under the patronage of Guru Gobind Singh's Anandpur Durbar.

Whilst mainstream Sikhs refer to their traditional stories as Sakhis, the Sewapanthis referred to their tradition of stories as Parchai, which are life stories related to the Sewapanthi mahatmas. According to Harbhajan Singh, the Sewapanthis were able to continue writing Sikh literature despite Mughal oppression of the Sikhs during the 18th century due to the fact they were sehajharis who did not have an external Khalsa Sikh appearance. Due to their Sindhi connection, engagements with Sufi texts and Islamic literature has been common among the Sewapanthis historically.

== Places of worship ==
A Sewapanthi temple is known as a tikana (a term also used for Nanakpanthi temples). They are highly prevalent in Sindh, where religious syncretism between Hinduism and Sikhism can be observed and clear-cut religious boundaries become blurry and ill-defined. At a tikana is usually a copy of the primary Sikh scripture, Guru Granth Sahib, alongside images of Indic deities. When a new leader is appointed as head of a tikana (centres for the sect), they are bestowed a broom and bowl. The broom embodies cleanliness whilst the bowl epitomises serving others.

== Udasi connection ==
There are strong historical links between these two sampardas. Bhai Khanaiya was an Udasi. Bhai Addan Shah was initially an Udasi and a student of Baba Gurdas Dakhani. This close bond has remained to this day.

== Leaders ==
=== Early leaders ===
No.	Name (Birth–Death)	Portrait	Term	Reference(s)
1.	Bhai Kanhaiya (1648 – 1718)		1705 – 1718	
2.	Sewa Ram (1658 – 1728)		1718 – 1728	
3.	Addan Shah (1688 – 26 April 1757)		1728 – 1757	
4.	Bhalla Ram (1778 – 1854)			
5.	Jagata (Note: His name is alternatively spelt as Jagta.) (1798 – 1868)			

=== Later leaders ===
==== Tikana Bhai Jagta ====
No.	Name (Birth–Death)	Portrait	Term	Reference(s)
Mahants succeeding Jagata (Note: As head leader of the 'Sewa Panthi Addan Shahi Sabha'.)
6.	Hazari Ram (1813 – 1883)			
7.	Sahai Ram (1825 – 1901)			
8.	Ralya Ram (1842 – 1927)			
9.	Lakhmi Das (1928 – 1965)			
10.	Gulab Singh (1881 AD – 1908 AD)		1881 AD - 1908 AD	
11.	Asa Singh (9 December 1893 – 1 January 1974)		8 May 1950 - 1 January 1974	
12.	Tirath Singh (12 February 1925 – 14 January 2008)		14 January 1974 – 14 January 2008	
13.	Kahan Singh Ji (September 15, 1943 – present)		January 15, 2008 – present	

==== Others ====
- Mahant Karamjeet Singh Yamunangar

== Prominent saints ==
- Baba Sham Singh
- Sant Amir Singh
- Baba Jhanda Singh
- Baba Kharag Singh of Bir Sahib

== See also ==
- Sevā
- Nanua Bairagi
