= Mazari (Baloch tribe) =

Pakistani tribe

Languages
- Balochi language, Urdu

Religion
- Sunni Islam

Related ethnic groups
- Baloch tribes

Mazari (Balochi and Urdu: مزاری) is a Baloch tribe in Pakistan. Mazari is derived from the Balochi word mazar, which means "Tiger" in the Balochi language.

Rojhan-Mazari, a town in the Rajanpur District of the Punjab near the inter-provincial borders of Balochistan, Sindh and Punjab, is the stronghold and the headquarter of Mazari tribe.

== History ==
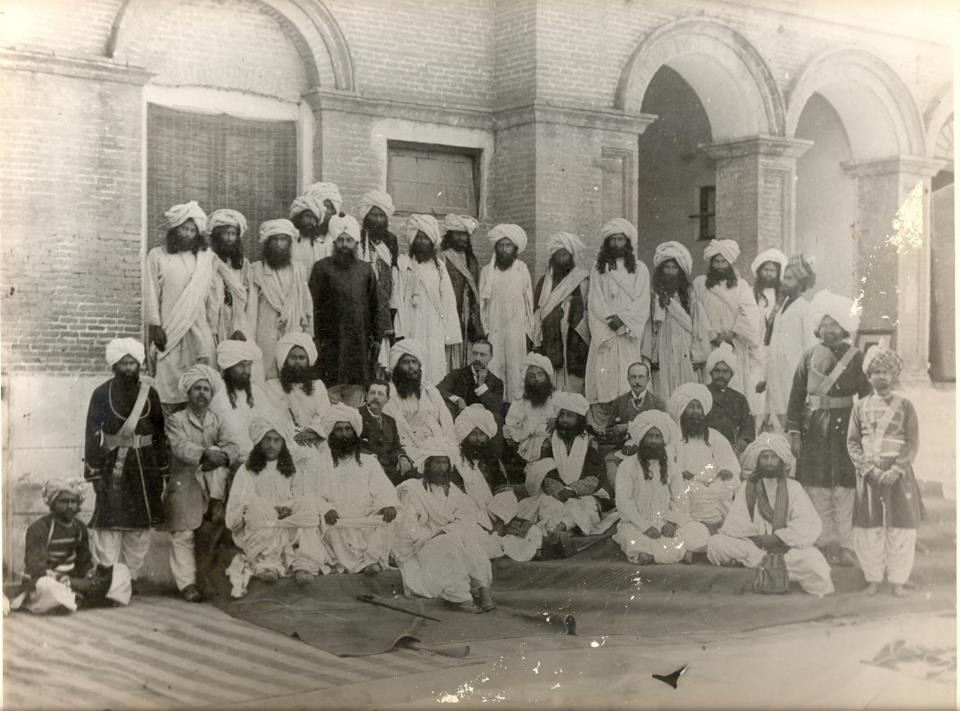
Sardar Imam Buksh Khan Mazari(K.C.I.E) with Richard I.Bruce(C.I.E) Commissioner of The Derajat in April 1896, Dera Ghazi Khan

The Mazari tribe is one of the oldest tribes of the Baloch. The Mazari has two branches, the Balachani, of Baloch origin, and the Kurd, of Kurdish origin. The area the Mazari conquered is still known as Tuman Mazari. It encompassed an area that included most of Kashmore District in Sindh, Chatha Baksha, Mazari District, and all of Tehsil Rojhan in the Punjab.

The arrival of the British saw the golden era for the Mazari tribe. The chief of the tribe ruled an area from the town of Bhong all the way to the Sulaiman Mountain Range and from Kashmore to Giamul. This is estimated to be an area of at least 8,000 kilometers². The Mazari Baloch fought many battles against the Sikhs of Punjab who were the dominant power before the arrival of the British.

=== Wars with the Sikh Empire ===
In 1836, Mithankot, by then a strong Sikh garrison fortress, was attacked by the Mazari Baloch tribal forces under the command of Sardar Karam Khan who was the cammander of Mazari forces, the younger brother of the Mazari Chief, Sardar Mir Bahram Khan. The attack came as result of the constant threats by Maharaja Kharak Singh against Rojhan Mazari. The garrison was burnt to the ground and any prisoners captured were skinned alive. Maharaja Ranjit Singh retaliated by sending Diwan Sawan Mal Chopra, the Governor of Multan to attack Rojhan.

Rojhan was burnt. Despite this, casualties on the Mazari side were minimal as the Sikh Army lost the element of surprise and the Mazari were able to evacuate their city in time. They subsequently took refuge in the Sulaiman Mountains and continued to harass the Sikhs in Guerrilla warfare tactics. This resulted in constant skirmishes between both parties. According to the book, 'Tehreek e Mujahideen', after hearing about the bravery of the Mazari, Syed Ahmad Barelvi of Tehreek-e-Mujahidin approached Sardar Karam Khan, at Kin and offered an alliance to fight jointly against Sikhs and destroy the Kafir kingdom of Lahore, however Sardar Karam Khan refused to accept the offer, after having consulting his elder brother, Mir Bahram Khan Mazari. Thereafter, Diwan Sawan Mal Chopra invited Sardar Karam Khan to Multan where they entered into a mutual agreement which was to be ratified at Lahore.

Finally, in 1838, Mir Bahram Khan visited Lahore with 12,000 Mazari tribesmen and officials at the invitation of the Maharaja Ranjit Singh. The Mazari was well received by the Maharaja at the Lahore Fort and given a royal welcome. The Maharaja renovated the Mughal-era Naulakha Pavilion (Saman Burj) inside the Lahore Fort for the month-long stay of Sardar Mir Bahram Khan Mazari. This meeting between the two leaders officially brought an end to the long war between the Mazari Baloch and the Sikh Empire that started with the attack on Mithankot. This picture of Mir Bahram Khan Mazari is in the Sikh War Gallery in Amritsar, India, and was painted by the French artist of Maharaja Ranjit Singh's Court when Mir Bahram Khan Mazari visited Lahore.

== Geography ==
The area held by the Mazari Tribe can be categorized as arid as well as fertile. To the west of Rojhan-Mazari lie the Sulaiman Range, and to the east, flows the river Indus. Rainfall is scarce, but heavy showers do occur 3-4 times every year which lead to hill torrents from the west. The climate is excellent for crops like cotton, wheat, rice, and sugar cane to grow.

== Language ==
The language which the Mazari tribe speaks is known as Sulaimani Balochi which is widely spoken in Rojhan Mazari, Kashmor and in other parts of Balochistan as well. Balochi language is also widely understood in the Rojhan Mazari.

== Figures ==
=== Mir Imam Buksh Khan Mazari ===
Mir Imam Buksh Khan Mazari was the second son of Mir Bahram Khan Mazari. Mir Dost Ali Khan, his elder brother, was the initial chieftain of the tribe, but was soon replaced by his younger brother, Imam Buksh Khan who took charge of the tribe.

Lepel Griffin's book mentions Sir Nawab Imam Buksh Khan Mazari and his son Nawab Mir Bahram khan Mazari:

He (Imam Buksh Khan) speedily recognised the advantages of the new regime of law and order, and threw himself heart and soul into the work of making good subjects of the Mazaries. He never allowed self-interest or partnership stand in the way of justice; and the general recognition of his integrity gave him enormous influence, not only with Baluches generally, but among all classes of the population, Musalman and Hindu. He died in 1903 and his eldest son, Nawab Bahram Khan, who inherited the whole of his jagir, succeeded him as a chief of the Mazari Tribe. He is a Provincial Darbari and has been given the powers of an Assistant Collector. Of his brothers, Sardar Ghulam Haider Khan is an Extra Assistant Commissioner and Sardar Ata Muhammad Khan a Deputy Superintendent of Police. Of his other relations, his cousin Sardar Ali Akbar Khan is a Divisional Darbari, his cousin Sardar Taj Muhammad Khan is Subedar-Major of the Baloch Levy and his nephew Sardar Ghaus Bakhsh Khan a Jamadar of the B.M. Police and an Honorary Magistrate and Munsiff.

=== Khan Bahadur Sardar Rahim Yar Khan Mazari ===
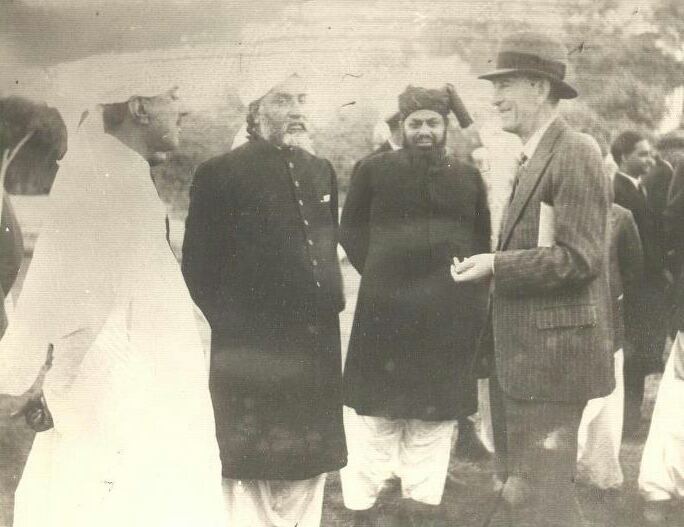
Khan Bahadur, Sardar Rahimyar Khan Mazari (second from left) with a British official and other Baloch sardars

Rahim Yar Khan was the eldest son of Sardar Ali Akbar Khan Mazari and the grandson of Mir Bahram Khan. The British gave him the title of Khan Bahadur because of his tireless efforts in the service of the Empire. He was made the interim Tumandar/Chief of the tribe when Mir Murad Bukhsh Khan died and his son, Mir Balakh Sher Mazari, was still a minor.

Rahim Yar Khan, Mazari, Sardar, Khan Bahadur, Magistrate First Class, Sub-Judge, Provincial Durbari, Rojhan, District Dera Ghazi Khan. Born 1898. As Musahib Khas to the Honorable Sir Nawab Behram Khan Sahib K.C.I.E, Mazari Chief, gained considerable reputation for having satisfactorily performed a lot of intricate duties. After due consideration the Chief Political Agent in August 1933, appointed Sardar Rahim Yar Khan as guardian, although Sardar Rahim Yar Khan had not applied for it. His high abilities were amply recognized by Government. He was made Provincial Durbari, Punjab and Sind; member, Shahi Jirga, Dera Ghazi Khan; and member, Shahi Jirga, Sind. In 1935 he was invested with criminal powers 2nd class, in 1937 Civil powers 4th Class, and in 1939 criminal powers 1st Class together with some political powers.

In recognition of meritorious services to the Government he was conferred on the Title of Khan Bahadur in 1939. During the last Great War Khan Bahadur contributed one lakh of rupees to the War Loan and collected several thousands for War Fund.

=== Mir Balakh Sher Mazari ===
Mir Balakh Sher Mazari is the Chieftain (Tumandar) and the Paramount Sardar of the Mazari tribe. As the Chief of Mazaris, he holds the title of Mir, and also goes by the styles of Tumandar and Sardar. Mir Balakh Sher Mazari is the twenty-second Sardar and the seventh Mir of Mazaris. The eldest of three brothers, he has one surviving brother, Sherbaz Khan Mazari who played a prominent role in Pakistan politics. He is a former caretaker Prime Minister of Pakistan and has been elected to the National Assembly numerous times. He was born on 8 July 1928 to Mir Murad Buksh Khan Mazari, the twenty-first Sardar and the Sixth Mir of Mazaris. Initially, Khan Bahadur Sardar Rahimyar Khan Mazari was made the caretaker chieftain of the tribe, otherwise known as, Mir Sahib. Upon reaching age, Mir Balakh Sher was formally acknowledged as the Chief by the British government and tribal elders. His father, Mir Murad Buksh Khan Mazari had earlier succeeded his elder brother, Mir Dost Muhammad Khan Mazari as Chief. They were the sons of Mir Sher Muhammad Khan Mazari, the Nineteenth Sardar and Fourth Mir of Mazaris. Balakh Sher Mazari, after the completion of his education from Aitchison College and Oxford University Mazari went on to live in Rojhan-Mazari, from where he joined active politics in 1951. He went on to enjoy a fruitful career in politics, which spanned over five decades, before eventually retiring and passing on his political legacy to his grandsons, Dost Muhammad Mazari and Sher Muhammad Mazari. He died on 4 November 2022 peacefully in Lahore.

=== Sardar Sherbaz Khan ===
Sherbaz Khan Mazari is the youngest son of Mir Murad Baksh Khan. He was born in Rojhan in 1930 and was educated at the Royal Indian Military College in Dehra doon. In Aitchison College, Sardar Sherbaz Khan Mazari entered politics by supporting Fatima Jinnah, sister of Mohammad Ali Jinnah, against Ayub Khan in the Presidential elections of 1964. In 1970, he was elected to the National Assembly as an independent candidate. He was a signatory to the 1973 Constitution, as head of the independent group in the Assembly. After the Bhutto-led army action in Balochistan and the subsequent banning of the National Awami Party, he formed the National Democratic Party. This was part of an effort to oppose Zulfiqar Ali Bhutto's autocratic rule as well as to bring about peace in Balochistan. He served as the leader of the NDP from 1975 to 1985 and leader of the Opposition in Parliament from 1975 to 1977. A former friend of Zulfiqar Ali Bhutto, he became one of his main political opponents in the Pakistan National Alliance. The 1977 elections led to a civil agitation movement which ultimately ousted Zulfiqar Ali Bhutto's government and brought in Martial Law under General Zia.

During General Zia's regime he again played a key role in opposing the military regime. He helped establish Movement for the Restoration of Democracy (MRD), an alliance of opposition parties which included the Pakistan People's Party. He spearheaded a movement against the military government as the Chairman of MRD's "Pakistan Bachao" (Save Pakistan) Committee. The resulting agitation caused widespread commercial disruption in Sindh and parts of Punjab but was brutally suppressed by the army at a cost of many lives. It was only after Zia's death did democracy finally return to Pakistan. A strong believer of democracy Sardar Mazari was incarcerated on numerous occasions during both Zulfikar Ali Bhutto and General Zia's rule. He was one of the few West Pakistani politicians to have opposed the army in what was then East Pakistan, against the Bengali's and the only opponent of Zulfikar Bhutto to have condemned his murder. He was offered key political positions by Zulfikar Bhutto, Zia Ul Haq and later Benazir Bhutto, but declined each role. He has been an outspoken critic of the treatment meted out to Balochi separatists by the Central Government.

== Main clans ==
The Mazari Tribe consists of 4 large sub-clans and 60 small sub-tribes. The Mazari Chief family belongs to the Balachani Clan.

== See also ==
- Muhammad Abdullah Ghazi
- Shaukat Hussein Mazari
- Abdul Rashid Ghazi
