= Sawan Mal =

Sikh governor of Multan (1820–1844)

Diwan Sawan Mal
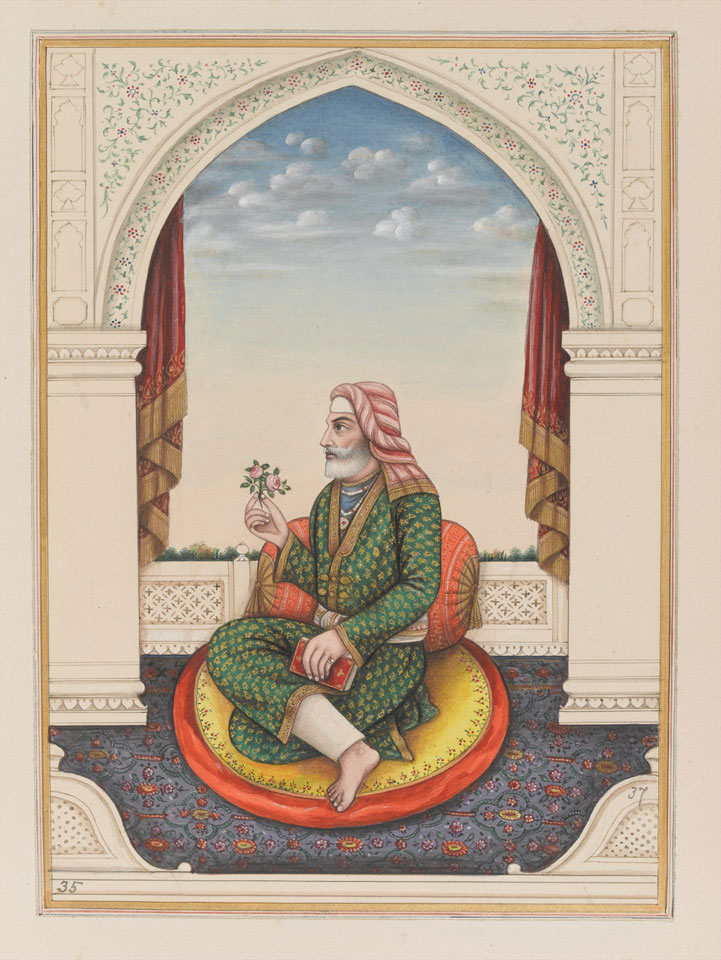
- Diwan Sawan Mal seated holding a lotus. Watercolour by a Company artist, Punjab, c. 1865

Sikh governor of Multan
- In office 1820–1844
- Monarchs: Ranjit Singh; Kharak Singh; Nau Nihal Singh; Sher Singh; Duleep Singh
- Preceded by: Muzaffar Khan Sadozai (as Durrani governor, d. 1818); Several temporary Sikh governors of Multan (1818–1820)
- Succeeded by: Diwan Mulraj Chopra

Personal details
- Born: Gujranwala, Sukerchakia Misl (modern day Punjab, Pakistan)
- Died: 29 September 1844 Multan, Sikh Empire (modern day Punjab, Pakistan)
- Cause of death: Seriously wounded by an under-trial prisoner
- Parent: Hoshnak Rai Chopra (father)

Sawan Mal (died 29 September 1844) was a Sikh Empire-era administrator and general who served as governor (Dewan) of Multan from 1820 to 1844.

== Biography ==
=== Early life ===
Sawan Mal was born into a Punjabi Hindu Khatri family of the Chopra gotra originally from Gujranwala, the region where Maharaja Ranjit Singh's Misl, the Sukerchakias held sway.

=== Career ===
Along with Hari Singh Nalwa, he was a top commander in Maharaja Ranjit Singh's Khalsa Army. As a general under Ranjit Singh, he assisted in wresting the subah (province) of Multan in 1818 from the Durrani governor Muzaffar Khan Sadozai. After a series of incompetent governors, Sawan Mal was appointed as the Dewan of the region.

Diwan Sawan Mal successfully cultivated indigo in the Multan area through an early, plentiful, and constant source of water realized by irrigation canal construction, which was tied to commercial cash cropping. Diwan Sawan Mal promoted the chakdari system and invited Hindu settlement in the region, with canal-building arrangements being centered around wells.

In 1834, he signed an agreement on behalf of the maharaja with Sardar Karam Khan, a Mazari warrior respected in his tribe as well as in the Sikh Army. Karam Khan was the younger brother of Bahram Khan, chief of the Baloch Mazari tribe, thereby ending the long war between the Sikhs and the Mazaris of Rojhan. He was succeeded to the governorship of Multan by his son, Mulraj Chopra, who was the last ethnic Punjabi to administer Multan.

Sawan Mal died on 29 September 1844 due to wounds inflicted upon him by an under-trial prisoner.
