= Bhai Kanhaiya =

Sikh saint and founder of the Sewapanthis

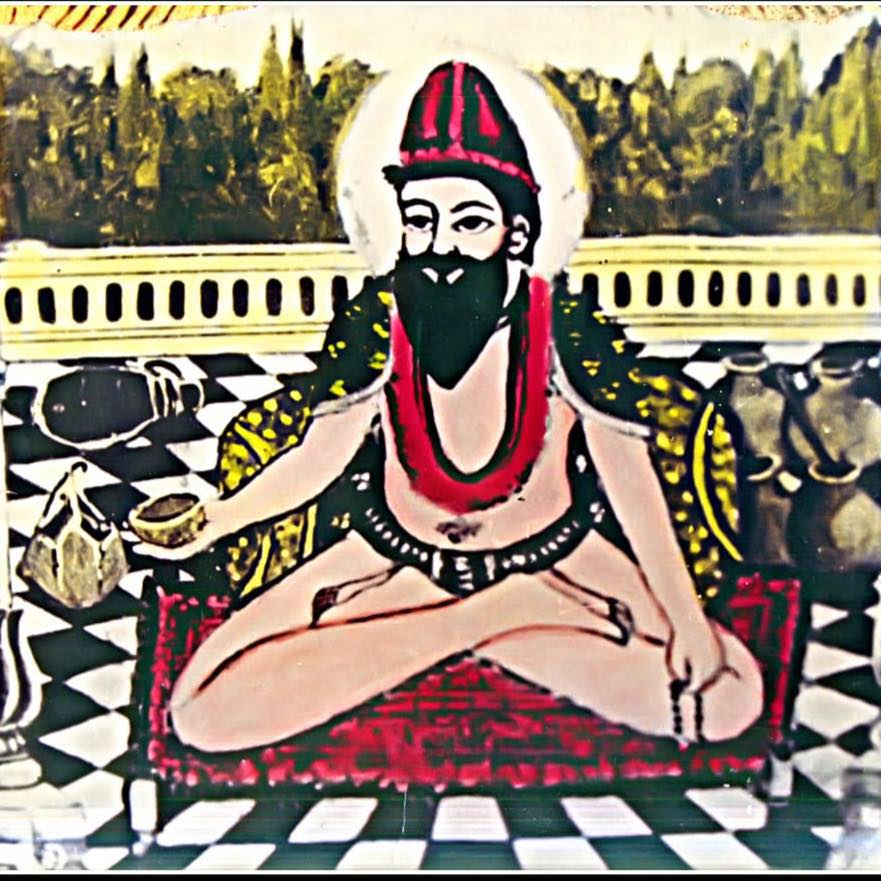
- Fresco depicting Bhai Kanhaiya seated on a terrace leaning against a bolster from Sri Khat Wari Darbar, Shikarpur, Sindh

Leader of the Sewapanthi sect
- Preceded by: none (founder)
- Succeeded by: Bhai Sewa Ram

Personal life
- Parent(s): Mata Sundri Ji and Sri Nathu Ram Ji

Religious life
- Religion: Sikhism
- Sect: Sewapanthi

Religious career
- Teacher: Nanua Bairagi

Bhai Kanhaiya (1648–1718; also spelt as Bhai Ghanaiya), known as Khat Waro Bao and Khaatwala Baba in Sindh, was a Sikh disciple of Guru Tegh Bahadur and was requested to establish the Sewapanthi or Addanshahi order of the Sikhs by Guru Gobind Singh. He was known for pouring water for all the wounded members of the battlefield no matter whether they were Sikhs or fighting for the Sikhs.

During his youth he also spent a lot of time in the company of Nanua Bairagi, who belonged to a Saini agriculture family and was also a disciple and comrade of last three Sikh gurus. Nanua Bairagi was a renowned poet-mystic of Punjab and he left a deep imprint on Bhai Kanhaiya's spiritual and humanitarian outlook in his formative years.

== Biography ==
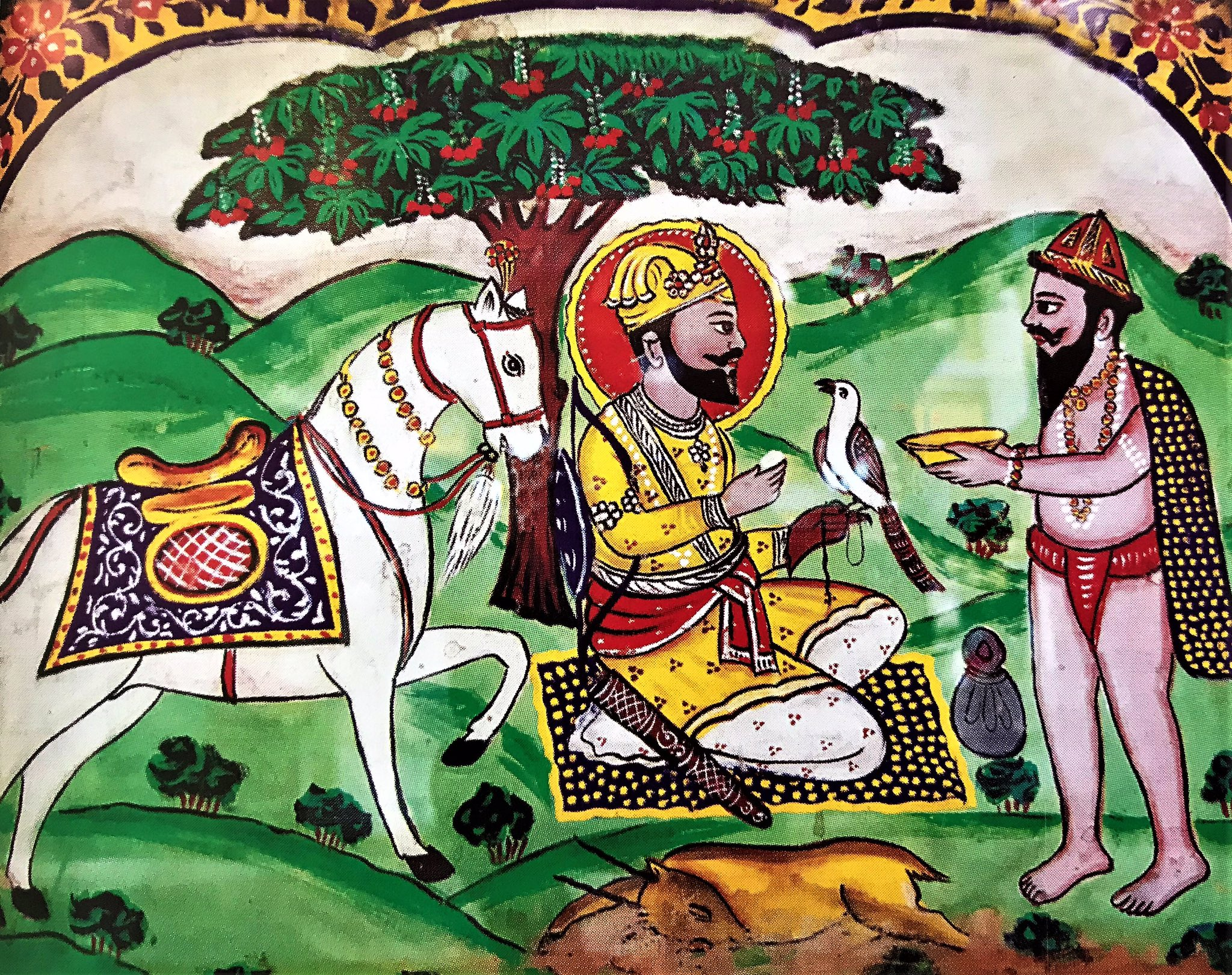
Fresco depicting Bhai Khanaiya meeting Guru Gobind Singh from Sri Khat Wari Darbar, Shikarpur, Sindh

Bhai Kanhaiya was born in 1648 in the Dhamman Khatri community of Sodhara, to Mata Sundari ji and father Sri Nathu Ram's near Wazirabad in the Sialkot region (now in Pakistan), and his father was a wealthy broker. He was known to have a habit of giving to the poor from a very young age.

In his youth, Kanhaiya met a man named Nanua Bairagi, who was a Sikh of the 9th Sikh guru, Guru Tegh Bahadur. Their connection allowed Kanhaiya to meet the guru, and he converted to Sikhism. Kanhaiya stayed and continued to serve the sangat (community). Kanhaiya was assigned as the Guru Tegh Bahadur's water bearer and later in langar (community kitchen). He also looked after Guru Tegh Bahadur's steeds. After the death of the 9th Guru, the 10th Guru, Guru Gobind Singh, had ascended and Kanhaiya began to follow him. Kanhaiya was visiting Anandpur in May 1704 when the city was attacked by a combination of Rajput troops and their Mughal partners. Bhai Kanhaiya was frequently seen carrying a goatskin water pocket and serving water to anyone who was thirsty. He performed this sewa (magnanimous administration) with adoration. This irritated the Sikh warriors on the battlefield, who complained to the Guru. The Guru then asked Kanhaiya, "These Sikhs are saying that you go and feed water to the enemy and they recover". Kanhaiya replied, saying, "Yes, my Guru, what they say is true, however, there were no Mughals or Sikhs on the battlefield. All I saw were people."

The answer satisfied the Guru. He provided with Bhai Kanhaiya with medical aid, and later on his mission came to be known as the Sewa Panthi Sampradaye.

=== In Sindh ===
He was sent by the Guru to Sindh in-order to propagate the Sikh religion amongst the locals of the region. He is locally known as Khat Waro Bao or Khaatwala Baba in Sindh as he would preach whilst seated on a bed. The Khat Wari Darbar in Shikarpur is a Sindhi temple dedicated to him. After his passing, he was succeeded as head of the Sewapanthi sect by Bhai Sewa Ram. His successor would continue preaching and proselytizing Sikhism in Sindh.

== Legacy ==
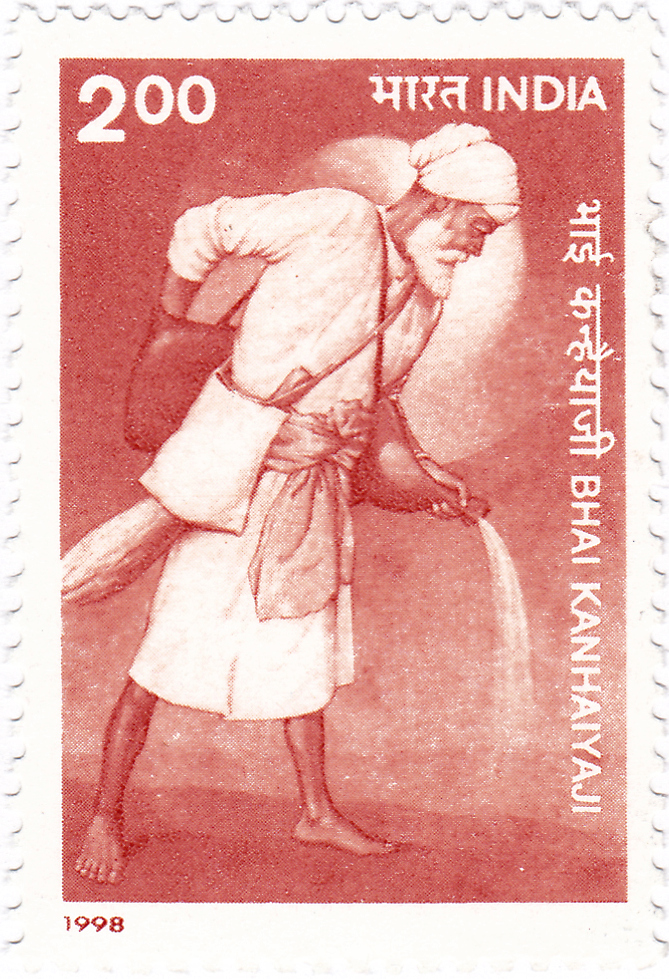
Bhai Kanhaiya on a 1998 stamp of India

Shiromani Gurdwara Parbandhak Committee under president Kirpal Singh Badungar for the first time celebrated the birth anniversary of Bhai Kanhaiya on September 20, 2017. In this context, the Government of Punjab, India under chief minister Amarinder Singh too celebrated his birthday on September 20, 2017 as the Manav Sewa Diwas.

== See also ==
- List of Sikhs
