= Rojhan =

- City
- Location within Punjab, Pakistan Location within Pakistan
- Coordinates: 28°41′15″N 69°57′20″E
- Country: Pakistan
- Province: (Punjab, Pakistan) Punjab
- Division: Dera Ghazi Khan
- District: Rajanpur
- Tehsil: Rojhan

Population (2017)
  - Total: 14,494
- Time zone: UTC+5 (PST)
- Calling code: 604

Rojhan (Urdu: روجهان) is a city and headquarters of Rojhan Tehsil in Rajanpur District of Punjab, Pakistan. It is the headquarter of the Mazari tribe.
