= List of Sikhs =

Sikh (/ˈsiːk/ or /ˈsɪk/; Punjabi: ਸਿੱਖ, sikkh IPA: [ˈsɪkkʰ]) is the title and name given to an adherent of Sikhism. The term has its origin in the Sanskrit term śiṣya, meaning "disciple, learner" or śikṣa, meaning "instruction".

== Academia ==
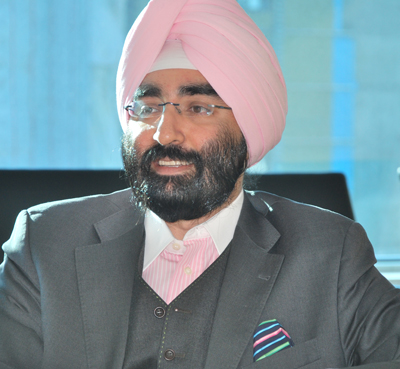
Jagdeep Singh Bachher is the incoming Chancellor at University of Waterloo

- Jagdeep Singh Bachher, Chancellor of University of Waterloo and Chief Investment Officer of the University of California
- Deep Saini, Vice Chancellor at McGill University

=== Biology ===
- Baldev Singh Dhillon
- Dilbagh Singh Athwal
- Gurcharan Singh Kalkat
- Kartar Singh Thind
- Khem Singh Gill
- Mohinder Singh Randhawa
- Narinder Singh Randhawa
- Sardul Singh Guraya

=== Economics ===
- Indermit Gill, Chief Economist of the World Bank
- Manmohan Singh, Padma Vibhushan and prime minister.
- Tarlok Singh (economist), Padma Vibhushan, member of Planning Commission (India) from its inception in 1950 until 1967.
- Sucha Singh Gill

=== Medicine ===
- Autar Singh Paintal, Padma Vibhushan, discovered Type B atrial receptors, Gastric Stretch Receptors, Mucosal Mechanoreceptors of the Intestines, Ventricular Pressure Receptors, Pressure-Pain Receptors in the Muscles, and Juxtacapillary receptors.
- Baldev Singh
- Daljit Singh
- David Shannahoff-Khalsa, prolific researcher on the psychiatric applications of Kundalini Yoga based at the Biocircuits Institute at the University of California, San Diego.
- Gagandeep Kang
- Jaswant Singh Neki
- Harkishan Singh
- Harpal Kumar, Chief Executive of Cancer Research UK
- Harminder Dua, discovered a previously unknown layer lurking in the human eye named the "dua's layer".
- Harpinder Singh Chawla
- Harvinder Sahota, cardiologist; invented the FDA-approved Perfusion Balloon Angioplasty and holds patents of 24 other medical inventions.
- Jasbir Singh Bajaj, Padma Vibhushan
- Khem Singh Grewal
- Khushdeva Singh
- Kirpal Singh Chugh
- M. M. S. Ahuja
- Prithipal Singh Maini
- Sahib Singh Sokhey
- Sat Bir Singh Khalsa, Harvard University–based researcher of Kundalini Yoga and an authority on the field of yoga research.
- Tarlochan Singh Kler

=== Physics ===
- Manjit Singh (armament scientist)
- Narinder Singh Kapany, physicist, specializing in fiber optics. He was named as one of the seven "Unsung Heroes" by Fortune Magazine in its Businessmen of the Century (November 22, 1999) edition.
- Piara Singh Gill

== Architects ==
- Ram Singh, one of pre-partition Punjab's foremost architects

== Artists ==
=== Actors ===
==== Punjabi Cinema ====
- Ammy Virk
- Amrinder Gill
- Anurag Singh
- Babbu Maan
- Baljit Singh Deo
- Binnu Dhillon
- Diljit Dosanjh
- Gippy Grewal
- Gugu Gill
- Gurdaas Maan
- Gurpreet Ghuggi
- Harbhajan Mann
- Harry Baweja
- Jasmin Bhasin
- Jaspal Bhatti
- Jaswinder Bhalla
- Jimmy Shergill
- Kulraj Randhawa
- Mahi Gill
- Mandy Takhar
- Neeru Bajwa
- Rana Ranbir
- Shavinder Mahal
- Sidhu Moosewala
- Simran Kaur Mundi
- Smeep Kang
- Sonam Bajwa
- Sonia Anand
- Surveen Chawla
- Yograj Singh
- Yuvraj Hans

==== Bollywood ====
- Gippy Grewal
- Honey Singh
- Manjot Singh
- Minissha Lamba
- Navneet Kaur Dhillon
- Sunny Leone
- Geeta Bali
- Gracy Singh
- Gulzar
- Guru Randhawa
- Jagjit Singh
- Jaspal Bhatti
- Jesse Randhawa
- Jimmy Shergill
- Joginder
- Kabir Bedi
- Kanwaljit Singh
- Kuldip Kaur
- Kulraj Randhawa
- Mangal Dhillon
- Manjot Singh
- Neetu Singh
- Neha Dhupia
- Poonam Dhillon
- Priya Gill
- Priya Rajvansh
- Swaran Lata
- Taapsee Pannu
- Yogeeta Bali
- Parmeet Sethi

==== Telugu Cinema ====
- Rakul Preet Singh
- Charmy Kaur
- Mehreen Pirzada
- Taapsee Pannu

==== British ====
- Ameet Chana – Actor
- Amy Maghera – Professional model turned actress
- Chandeep Uppal – Starred as Meena Kumar in the film Anita and Me.
- Jassa Ahluwalia – Actor and presenter
- Kulvinder Ghir
- Lena Kaur – Best known for her role as Leila Roy in Channel 4's Hollyoaks
- Mandip Gill – Actress
- Parminder Nagra
- Simon Rivers – English actor who played the role of Kevin Tyler in Doctors
- Stephen Uppal – Known for playing Ravi Roy in the British soap Hollyoaks

==== Others ====
- Kabir Bedi
- Satinder Sartaaj
- Tarsem Singh

=== Comedians ===
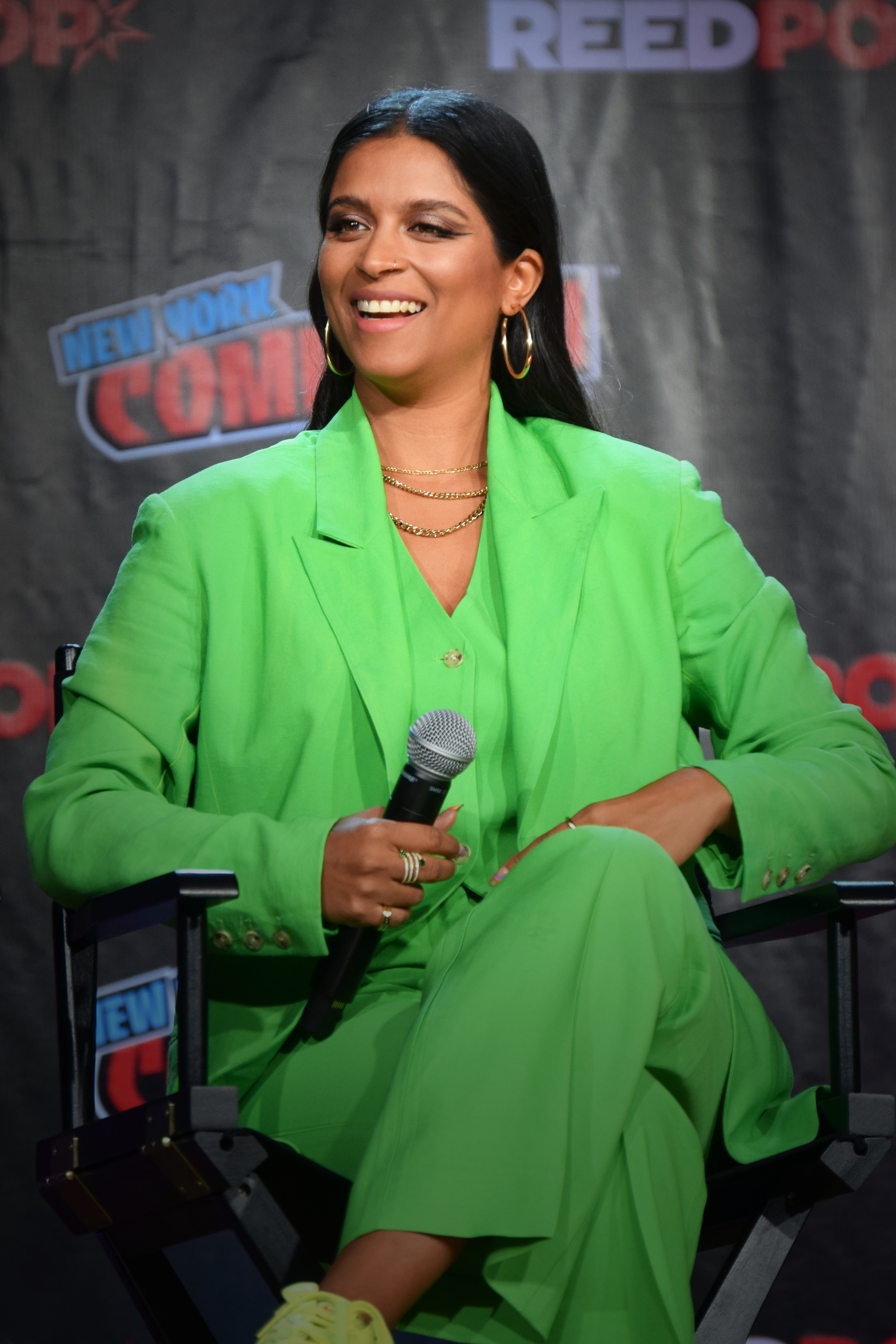
Lilly Singh became the first person of Indian descent to host an American major broadcast network late-night talk show, hosting A Little Late with Lilly Singh on NBC from 2019 to 2021.

- Paul Chowdhry – Comedian and actor
- Lilly Singh
- Jus Reign
- Jaspal Bhatti

=== Directors ===
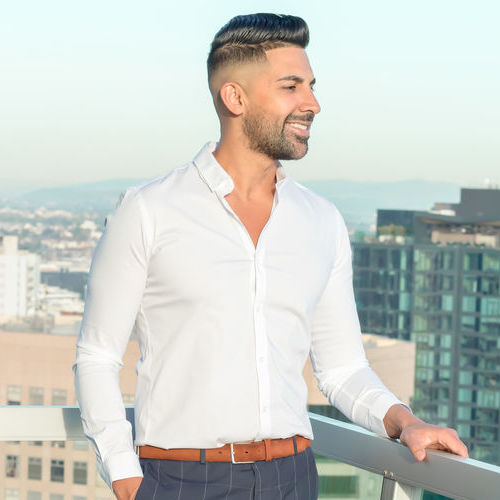
Dhar Mann is known for his video production company, Dhar Mann Studios, that creates short films for social media platforms such as YouTube.

- Dhar Mann
- Vikkstar123
- Gurinder Chadha
- Param Gill
- Perry Bhandal – Film director, screenwriter
- Namrata Singh Gujral

=== Fashion ===
- Harnaaz Kaur Sandhu, Punjabi beauty pageant titleholder and model who was crowned Miss Universe 2021
- Hasleen Kaur
- Jesse Randhawa, Bollywood model
- Kuljeet Randhawa
- Mahek Chahal
- Mandira Bedi
- Navneet Kaur Dhillon
- Neha Kapur
- Neelam Gill, Burberry
- Gurleen Chopra, model
- Simran Kaur Mundi
- Sonampreet Bajwa
- Waris Ahluwalia

=== Other artists ===
- Vishavjit Singh, American cartoonist

== Musicians ==
=== Punjabi music ===
- Amar Singh Chamkila
- Amrinder Gill
- AP Dhillon singer, rapper and record producer associated with Punjabi music
- Apna Sangeet
- Asa Singh Mastana
- B21 (Bally and Bhota Jagpal)
- Babbu Mann
- Balkar Sidhu
- Bally Sagoo
- Bhupinder Singh
- Bobby Friction
- Diljit Dosanjh
- Dr. Zeus
- Garry Sandhu
- Gippy Grewal
- Gurdas Mann
- Gurinder Gill
- Gurnam Bhullar
- Guru Randhawa
- Harbhajan Mann
- Hard Kaur
- Harrdy Sandhu
- Honey Singh
- Jas Mann (with Babylon Zoo)
- Jasmine Sandlas
- Jaspinder Narula
- Jass Manak
- Jassie Gill
- Jaz Dhami
- Jazzy B
- Juggy D
- Kamal Heer
- Kanth Kaler
- Karan Aujla
- Kuldeep Manak
- Labh Janjua
- Lal Chand Yamla Jatt
- Lehmber Hussainpuri
- Malkit Singh
- Manmohan Waris
- Miss Pooja
- Narinder Biba
- Nimrat Khaira
- Panjabi MC
- Prem Dhillon
- Rabbi Shergill
- Ravinder Grewal
- Rishi Rich
- Roshan Prince
- Sahotas
- Sangtar
- Satinder Sartaaj
- Shailendra Singh
- Shehnaaz Gill
- Sidhu Moose Wala Indian rapper, singer-songwriter
- Snatam Kaur
- Sukha
- Sukhbir
- Surinder Kaur
- Surinder Shinda
- Surjit Bindrakhia
- Tarsame Singh Saini AKA "Taz"
- Tarsem Jassar
- Uttam Singh

=== English music ===
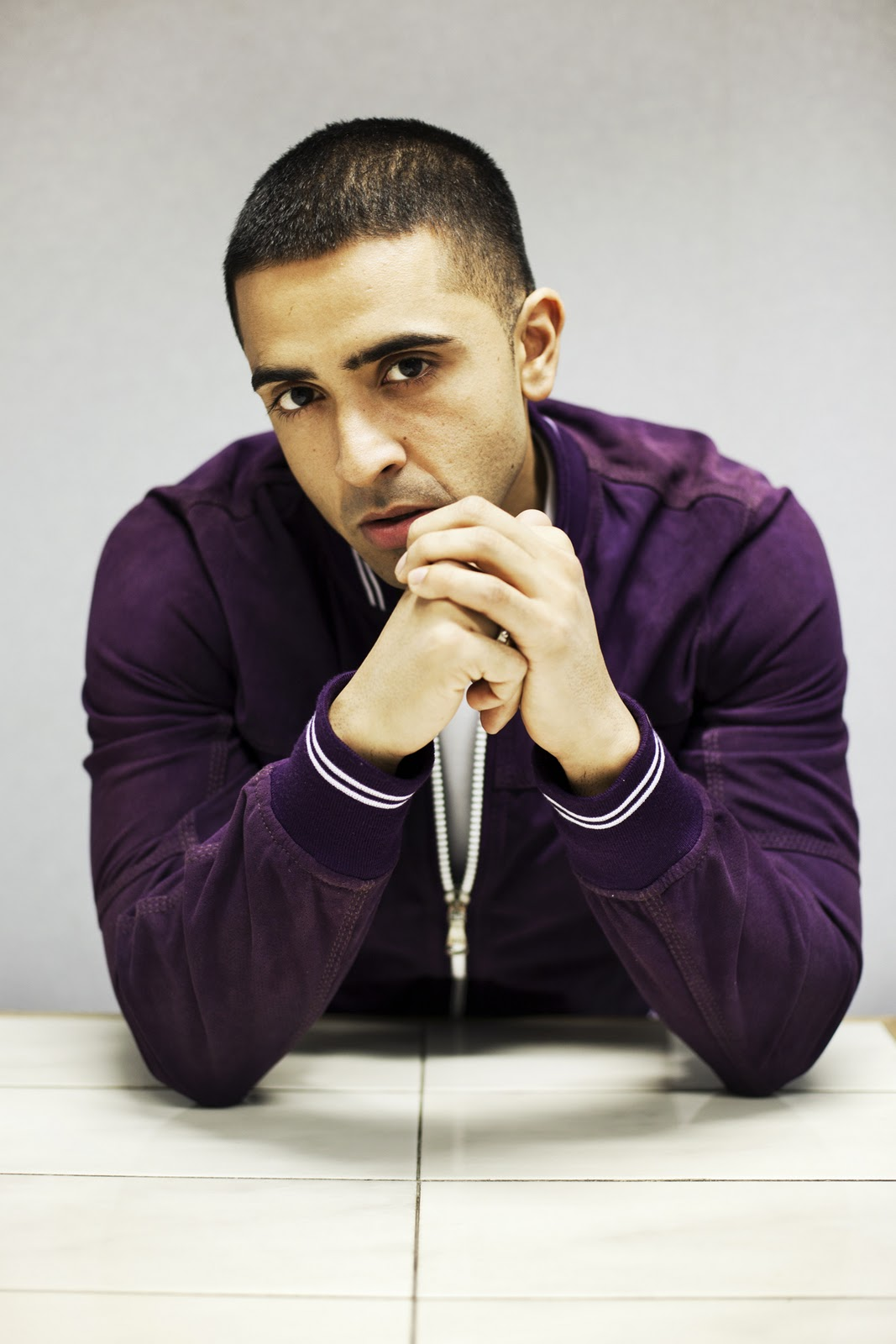
Kamaljit Singh Jhooti (better known by his stage name Jay Sean) became the first South Asian to top the Billboard Hot 100 in 2009 with his single Down.

- Jay Sean
- NAV (rapper)

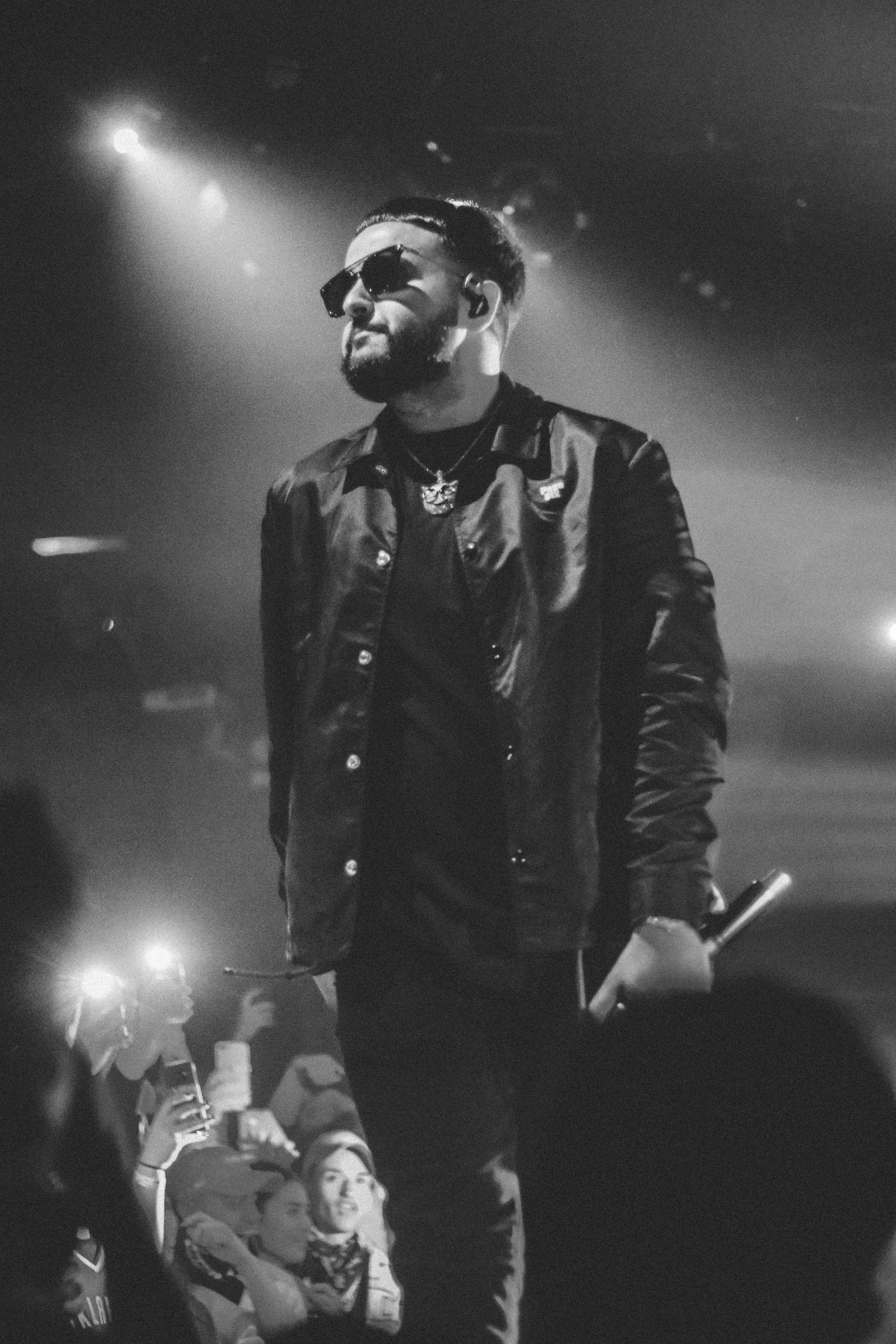
Navraj Singh Goraya (better known by his stage name NAV) topped the Billboard Hot 200 in 2019 with his album Bad Habits.

=== Visual arts ===
- Amrita Sher-Gil
- Aman Singh Gulati
- Sobha Singh
- S. G. Thakur Singh
- Sohan Singh

=== Hindi music ===
- Arijit Singh
- Asees Kaur
- Daler Mehndi
- Diljit Dosanjh
- Guru Randhawa
- Hans Raj Hans
- Harrdy Sandhu
- Harshdeep Kaur
- Honey Singh
- Jagjit Singh
- Jasleen Royal
- Mika Singh
- Neha Kakkar
- Sukhwinder Singh
- Badshah (rapper)

== Writers ==
- Ranj Dhaliwal
- Harbans Singh
- Jodh Singh
- Sant Isher Singh
- Rattan Singh Bhangu
- Max Arthur Macauliffe
- Khushwant Singh
- Tavleen Singh
- Sathnam Sanghera
- Jagjit Singh Dardi (Punjab Rattan)

=== Punjabi, Hindi and Urdu ===
- Rajkavi Inderjeet Singh Tulsi
- Bhai Gurdas
- Nanak Singh
- Bhai Kahn Singh Nabha
- Bhai Vir Singh
- Rajinder Singh Bedi
- Jaswant Neki
- Rupinderpal Singh Dhillon
- Harbhajan Singh
- Harcharan Singh (playwright)
- Jaswant Singh Kanwal
- Amrita Pritam, Padma Vibhushan
- Dalip Kaur Tiwana
- Kulwant Singh Virk
- Sahib Singh
- Pritam Saini

=== English ===
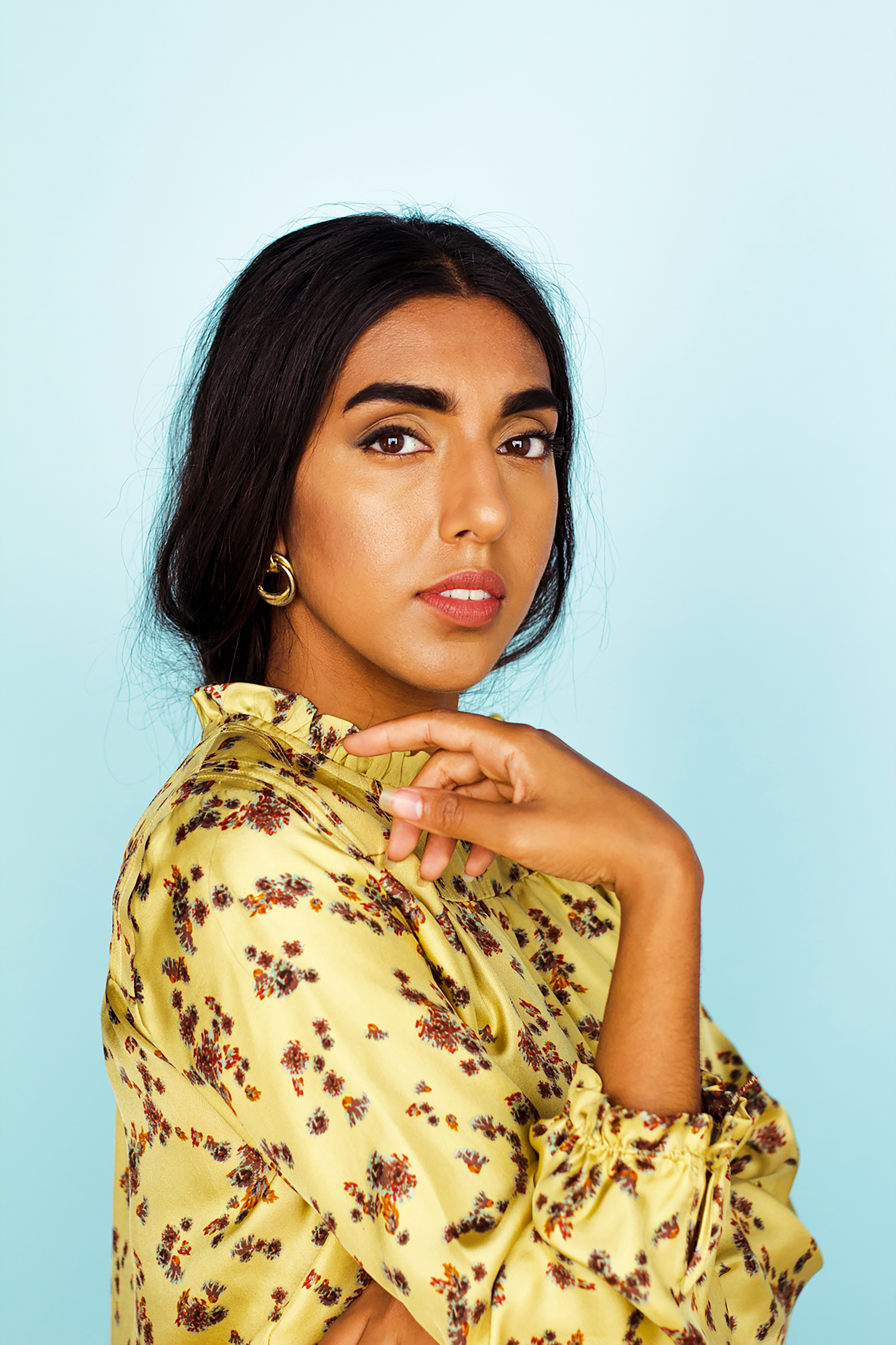
Rupi Kaur is a New York Times Bestselling poet.

- Rupi Kaur
- Bali Rai
- Jaspreet Singh
- Khushwant Singh, Padma Vibhushan
- Dayal Kaur Khalsa
- Ranj Dhaliwal
- Shauna Singh Baldwin
- Indu Banga
- Upinder Singh

== Athletes ==
=== Running ===
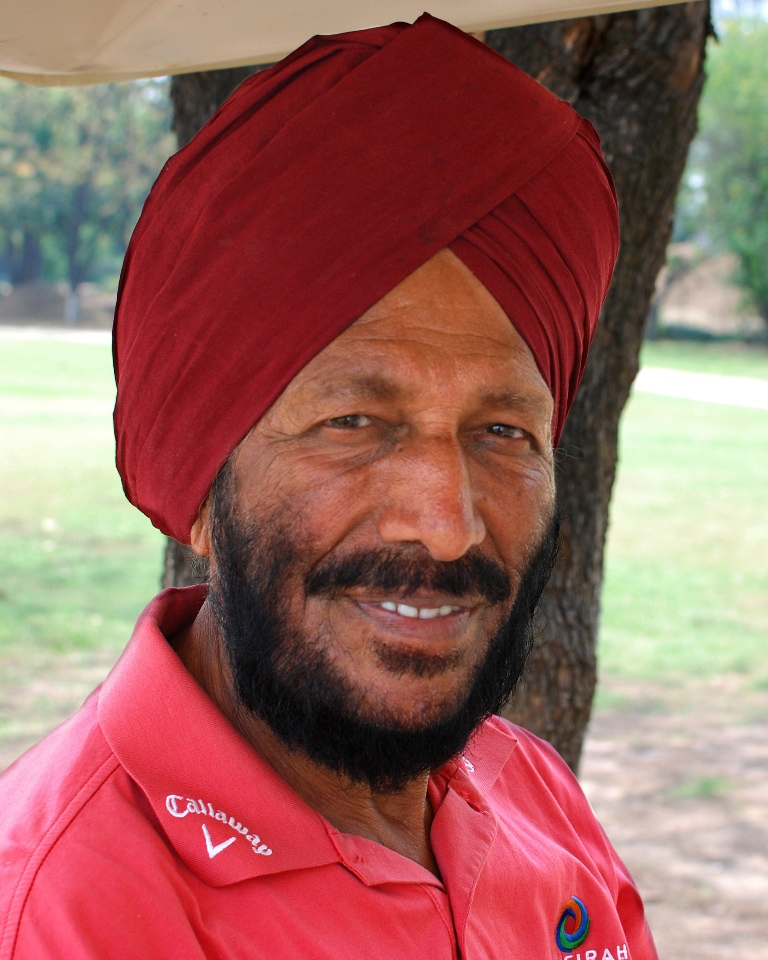
Milkha Singh

- Milkha Singh,
- Ranjit Bhatia
- Gurbachan Singh Randhawa
- Kamaljeet Sandhu
- Fauja Singh, centenarian marathon runner

=== Basketball ===
- Nav Bhatia, businessman, First Sikh with NBA Championship Ring
- Sim Bhullar, Canadian professional basketball player
- Satnam Singh Bhamara

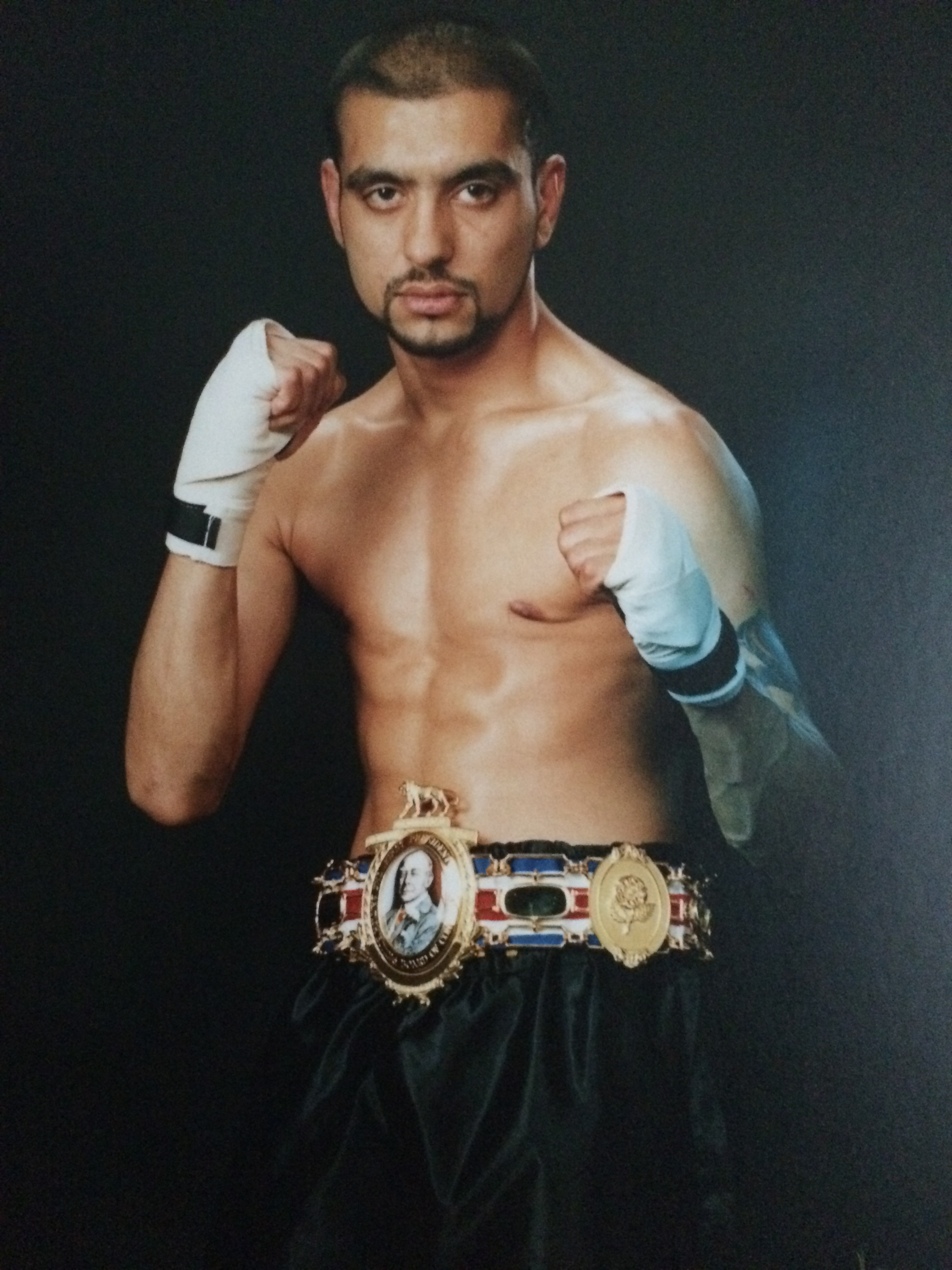
Harry Dhami

=== Boxing ===
- Harry Dhami - British professional boxer, British welterweight champion 2000-2001. First Asian to win a British Title. Undefeated Southern Area Champion 1996-2000
- Andrew Singh Kooner - Former bantamweight champion of Canada
- Sukhdeep Singh Chakria - Canadian middleweight boxer

=== Cycling ===
- Alexi Grewal, Olympic Gold medalist (1984 Summer Olympics in Los Angeles)

=== Cricket ===
- Amar Virdi - cricketer for Surrey County Cricket Club
- Anureet Singh
- Arshdeep Singh - cricketer for India's national team
- Balwinder Sandhu
- Bhupinder Singh, Sr.
- Bishan Singh Bedi - former cricketer and captain for India's national team
- Gurkeerat Singh Mann
- Gursharan Singh
- Harbhajan Singh
- Gurinder Sandhu - member of Australia cricket team
- Harvinder Singh
- Ish Sodhi - member of New Zealand cricket team
- Jasprit Bumrah - Indian cricketer, regarded as one of the best bowlers in modern-day cricket.
- Mandeep Singh
- Maninder Singh
- Manpreet Gony

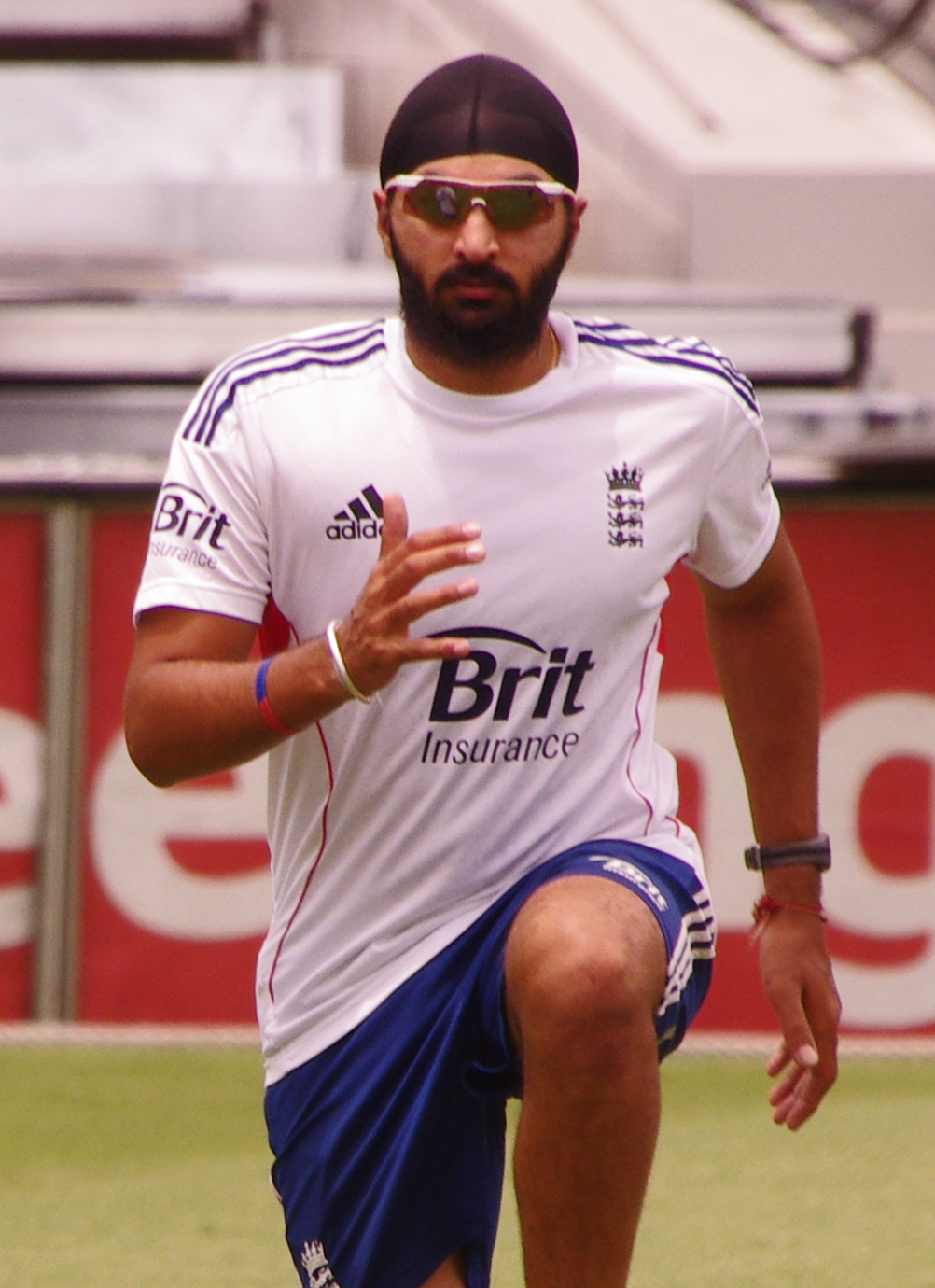
Monty Panesar, former cricketer for England's national team

- Monty Panesar - former cricketer for England's National Team member of English cricket team
- Navjot Singh Sidhu - former cricketer for India's national team
- Ravi Bopara - member of English cricket team
- Reetinder Sodhi
- Sarandeep Singh
- Simi Singh - cricketer for Ireland national team
- Simranjit Singh
- Shubman Gill
- Sukhdeep Singh - cricketer for Kenya national team
- Sunny Sohal
- Tanveer Sangha - member of Australia cricket team
- Vikramjit Singh - cricketer for Netherlands national team
- V. R. V. Singh
- Yograj Singh
- Yuvraj Singh - former cricketer for India's national team

=== Equestrian ===
- Amarinder Singh

=== Football ===
- Manprit Sarkaria - Footballer for SK Sturm Graz in Austrian Football Bundesliga. He was named in the Team of the Year for 2021-2022 Austrian Bundesliga Season
- Shaan Hundal - Footballer for Inter Miami
- Yan Dhanda - Footballer for Ross County F.C.
- Rikki Bains - Footballer for Bedworth United
- Danny Batth - Footballer for Sunderland A.F.C. Previously played for Wolverhampton Wanderers, Stoke City, Middlesbrough F.C.
- Mal Benning - Footballer for Port Vale F.C.
- Gurdev Singh Gill - Former footballer for India national football team
- Arjan Raikhy - Footballer for Aston Villa
- Harpal Singh - Former footballer for Leeds United
- Harmeet Singh - Former Norwegian international footballer
- Inder Singh - Former footballer for JCT FC
- Roger Verdi - Former North American Soccer League footballer
- Jazz Juttla - Former footballer for Greenock Morton F.C.
- Jarnail Singh - Former English Football League referee
- Jagvir Singh - Danish footballer

=== Golf ===
- Jyoti Randhawa
- Arjun Atwal
- Gaganjeet Bhullar
- Ashbeer Saini
- Jeev Milkha Singh

=== Hockey ===
==== Ice hockey ====
- Arshdeep Bains - Prospect of the Vancouver Canucks of the National Hockey League
- Jujhar Khaira - Canadian professional ice hockey centre currently playing for the Chicago Blackhawks in NHL.

==== Field hockey ====
- Avtar Singh Sohal
- Balbir Singh Dosanjh
- Harvinder Singh Kular
- Harvinder Singh Marwa
- Harmanpreet Singh
- Ravi Kahlon
- Ajit Pal Singh
- Baljeet Singh Saini
- Baljit Singh Dhillon
- Balwant (Bal) Singh Saini

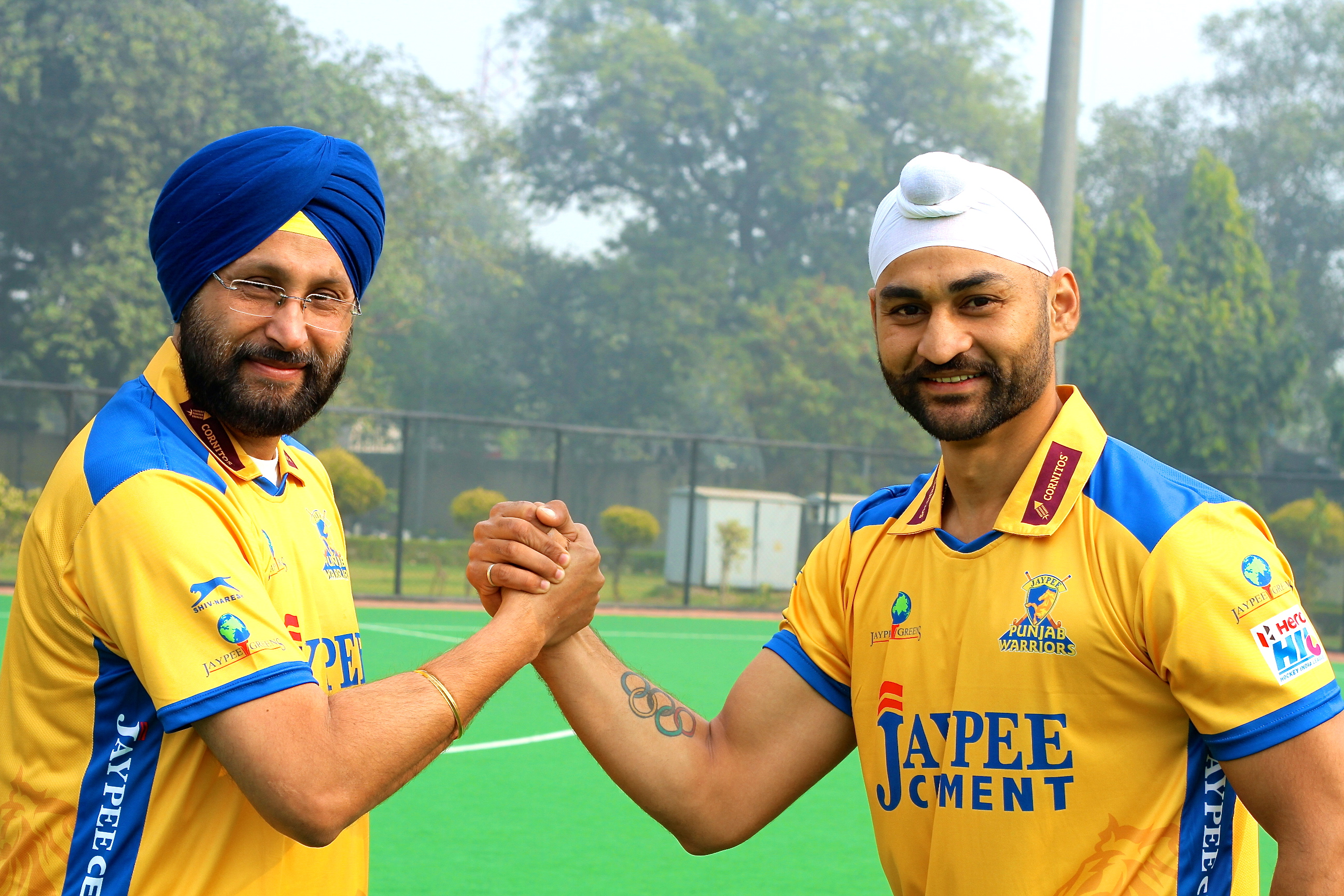
Jagbir Singh (L) and Sandeep Singh (R), Indian professional field hockey player

- Jagbir Singh
- Gagan Ajit Singh
- Garewal Singh
- Gurdev Singh Kullar
- Kulbir Bhaura
- Paramjit Bahia – field hockey Canada
- Pargat Singh
- Prabhjot Singh
- Prithipal Singh
- Ramandeep Singh
- Surjit Singh Randhawa
- Sardar Singh
- Sandeep Singh

=== Mixed martial arts ===
==== Muay Thai ====
- Kash Gill

=== Powerlifting ===
- Rajinder Singh Rahelu, Sikh paralympian and also 2004 Athens bronze medalist

=== Rally ===
- Joginder Singh, won the Safari Rally three times, in 1965 driving a Volvo PV544 with his brother Jaswant as co-driver, and in 1974 and 1976. A Kenyan known as "The Flying Sikh"
- Karamjit Singh, PRWC champion 2002, Asia Pacific Rally Championship champion 2001. A Malaysian known as the "Flying Sikh"

=== Rugby ===
- Tosh Masson

=== Shooting ===
- Abhinav Bindra, Olympic gold medalist in shooting
- Avneet Sidhu, Commonwealth Games medalist in shooting
- Manavjit Singh Sandhu, world champion in shooting
- Heena Sidhu, world champion in shooting

=== Skateboarding ===
- PJ Ladd, American professional skateboarder

=== Swimming ===
- Pamela Rai, 1984 Olympic bronze medalist, 1986 Commonwealth Games gold medalist

=== Wrestling ===
- Amar Dhesi - Canadian freestyle wrestler in 125 kg Class
- Dara Singh - Former wrestler and inducted in WWE Legacy Class in 2018
- Tiger Joginder Singh
- Randhawa
- Tiger Jeet Singh
- Dilsher Shanky - WWE wrestler
- Jinder Mahal - WWE wrestler and former holder of the WWE Championship
- Jasleen Singh Saini
- Gurjit Singh - Former WWE wrestler
- Ranjin Singh
- Gadowar Singh Sahota
- Arjan Bhullar
- Tiger Ali Singh
- Raj Singh (wrestler) - Former Impact Wrestling wrestler

== Business ==
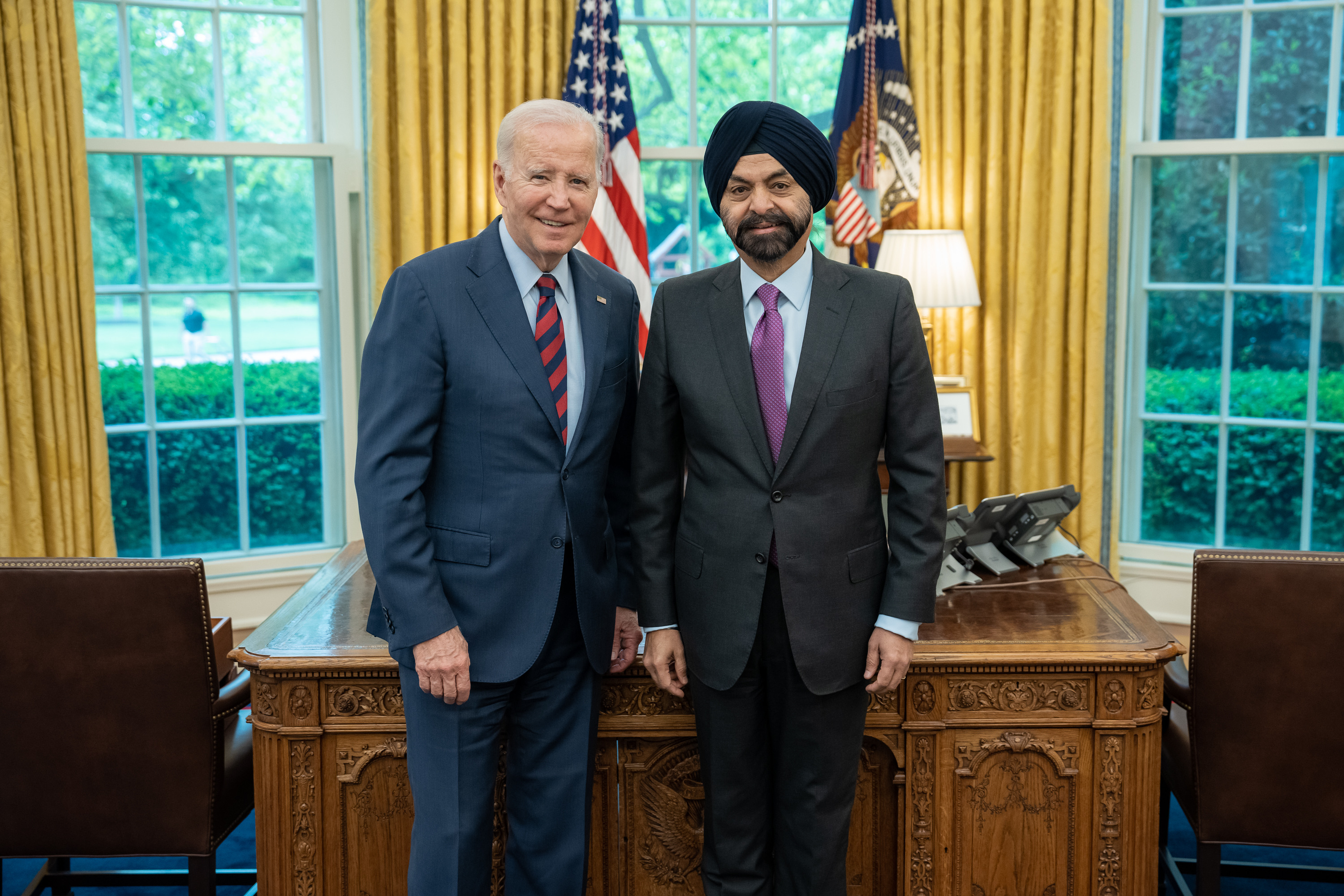
Ajay Banga is President of the World Bank Group.

- Ajay Banga, Indian-born American business executive. He is currently the president of the World Bank Group and was before that executive chairman of Mastercard, after having previously served as president and chief executive officer (CEO) of the company from July 2010 until December 31, 2020
- Analjit Singh, founder/chairman, Max India Limited; chair, Max New York Life Insurance Company Ltd; Max Healthcare Institute Ltd and Max Bupa Health Insurance Company Ltd
- Avtar Lit, founder of Sunrise Radio
- Avtar Saini, microprocessor designer and former vice president of Intel
- Baljit Singh Chadha, Canadian businessman and philanthropist
- Bob Singh Dhillon, founder/CEO, Mainstreet Equity Corp.
- Dyal Singh Majithia, Indian banker
- Gurbachan Singh Dhingra, owner of Berger Paints India
- Gurbaksh Chahal, entrepreneur who founded several internet advertising companies
- H. S. Bedi (entrepreneur), telecom
- Jasminder Singh, British businessman
- Jessie Singh Saini, founder of BJS Electronics and American industrialist of Indian descent
- Kamel Hothi, former banker at Lloyds Bank
- Kanwal Rekhi, one of the first Indian entrepreneurs in Silicon Valley
- Kuldip Singh Dhingra, owner of Berger Paints India
- Kushal Pal Singh, Chairman and CEO of DLF
- Malvinder Mohan Singh, Ranbaxy/Fortis Group
- Mohan Singh Oberoi
- M. S. Banga, ex-CEO, Hindustan Lever
- Omichund, Bengali Sikh merchant who participated in the conspiracy against the Nawab of Bengal with the British East India Company
- Param Singh (property developer), property developer, entrepreneur
- Prithvi Raj Singh Oberoi, Padma Vibhushan
- Sanjiv Sidhu, Founder and President of i2 Technologies, richest Indian on Earth in 2000
- Sant Singh Chatwal, owner of the Bombay Palace chain of restaurants and Hampshire Hotels & Resorts
- Satwant Singh, Le Meridien Hotel, DSS Enterprises, Pure Drink
- Shivinder Mohan Singh, Ranbaxy/Fortis Group
- Sobha Singh (builder) developer of New Delhi
- Tom Singh, founder, New Look (Fashion chain)
- Trishneet Arora, author
- Vikram Chatwal, hotelier

== Humanitarians ==
- Bhagat Puran Singh, founder of Pingalwara, Home of Disabled, Amritsar
- Bhai Trilochan Singh Panesar, devoted his life to sewa (service to community and God) and simran (remembrance of God), the two tenets of Sikh life.
- Ravi Singh, CEO, Khalsa Aid
- Alex Sangha, social worker and documentary film producer and Founder of Sher Vancouver
- Gurdev Singh Gill, Canadian physician, community leader, and activist, of Indian origin

== Military ==
=== Indian Army ===
- General Joginder Jaswant Singh, former Chief of Army Staff of Indian Army.
- General Bikram Singh, former Chief of Army Staff of Indian Army.
- Lieutenant General Bikram Singh, GOC XV Corps, 1960–63
- Lieutenant General Harbaksh Singh, Padma Vibhushan led Indian Army in Indo-Pak War of 1965
- Lieutenant General Joginder Singh Dhillon led Indian Army in Indo-Pak War of 1965
- Lieutenant General Jagjit Singh Aurora, led Indian Amy in Indo-Pakistani war of 1971

=== Indian Navy ===
- Admiral Karambir Singh
- Vice Admiral Surinder Pal Singh Cheema

=== Indian Air Force ===
- Marshal of the Indian Air Force Arjan Singh, former Chief of the Air Staff, Indian Air Force, Padma Vibhushan.
- Air Chief Marshal Dilbagh Singh, former Chief, Indian Air Force.
- Air Chief Marshal Birender Singh Dhanoa, former Chief, Indian Air Force.
- Air Chief Marshal Amar Preet Singh
- Harjit Singh Arora
- Trilochan Singh Brar
- Kulwant Singh Gill
- Jasjit Singh
- Jagjeet Singh
- Flying Officer Nirmal Jit Singh Sekhon, PVC

=== Singaporean Army and Navy ===
- General Ravinder Singh
- Pritam Singh
- Colonel Gurcharan Singh Sekhon

=== Sikhs In US Military ===
- Bhagat Singh Thind
- Uday Singh Taunque

=== Military Gallantry Award Winners ===
==== British Indian Army ====
===== Victoria Cross =====
- Ishar Singh, first Sikh to receive the Victoria Cross
- Nand Singh
- Gian Singh
- Parkash Singh
- Karamjeet Singh Judge

==== Indian Armed Forces ====
===== Param Veer Chakra =====
- Nirmal Jit Singh Sekhon, only Indian Air Force officer to be awarded Param Vir Chakra
- Subedar Bana Singh
- Karam Singh
- Joginder Singh Sahnan

===== Mahavir Chakra =====
- Dewan Ranjit Rai, first Indian to receive Mahavir Chakra
- Brigadier Rajinder Singh
- Rajinder Singh Sparrow
- Sant Singh
- Ranjit Singh Dyal
- Brigadier Kuldip Singh Chandpuri, known for his heroic leadership in the famous Battle of Longewala
- Major General Kulwant Singh Pannu

== Sikh General ==
- Baba Gurditta, son of Guru Hargobind (sixth Sikh guru), and father of Guru Har Rai (seventh Sikh guru) of Sikhism
- Bidhi Chand, Sikh religious preacher and military commander
- Baba Banda Singh Bahadur, commander of Khalsa army
- Binod Singh, army man and disciple of Guru Gobind Singh and was among few Sikhs who accompanied him to Nanded in 1706
- Baj Singh, also known as Baj Bahadur; Sikh general, governor, scholar and martyr
- Fateh Singh, warrior in Sikh history; known for beheading Wazir Khan who was the Mughal Governor of Sirhind, administering a territory of the Mughal Empire between the Sutlej and Yamuna rivers
- Sardar Hari Singh Nalwa, Commander-in-chief of the Sikh Khalsa Fauj, the army of the Sikh Empire
- Raja Mahan Singh Mirpuri, famous general in the Sikh Khalsa Army, and was the second-in-command General to General Hari Singh Nalwa
- Raja Khushal Singh Jamadar, military officer and chamberlain of the Sikh Empire
- Baba Sahib Singh Bedi
- Bhai Maharaj Singh

== Monarchs ==
=== Sikh Empire ===
- Maharaja Ranjit Singh, popularly known as Sher-e-Punjab, a founder of the Sikh Empire, also a Misldar of Sukerchakia Misl
- Maharaja Kharak Singh, second emperor of the Sikh Empire
- Maharaja Nau Nihal Singh, third emperor of the Sikh Empire
- Maharaja Sher Singh, fourth maharaja of the Sikh Empire
- Maharaja Duleep Singh, last Emperor of the Sikh Empire

=== Misl Period Rulers ===
- Nawab Kapur Singh, oraganizer of Sikh Confederacy and Dal Khalsa, He was also a Founder of Singhpuria Misl
- Jassa Singh Ahluwalia, Sikh leader of during the Sikh Confederacy and ruler of Ahluwalia Misl
- Jassa Singh Ramgarhia, Sikh leader during the period of Sikh Confederacy and founder of Ramgarhia Misl
- Baba Deep Singh, one of the most hallowed martyrs in the history of Sikhs, he was also a founder of Shaheedan Misl
- Charat Singh, father of Mahan Singh, and the grandfather of Ranjit Singh; he was the founder of Sukerchakia Misl
- Maha Singh, second chief of Sukerchakia Misl. He was the eldest son of Charat Singh. He was the father of Ranjit Singh
- Jodh Singh Ramgarhia, second ruler of the Ramgarhia Misl
- Phul Singh Sidhu, founder of the Phulkian Misl
- Hari Singh Dhillon, ruler of Bhangi Misl, one of the most powerful rulers of Punjab during Misl period
- Bhuma Singh Dhillon, ruler of Bhangi Misl
- Jhanda Singh Dhillon, Chief of Bhangi Misl; under his leadership the Dhillon family became the dominant de facto ruling power of Punjab.
- Jai Singh Kanhaiya, founder of Kanhaiya Misl
- Gurbaksh Singh Kanhaiya, second chief of Kanhaiya Misl. He was the eldest son of Jai Singh Kanhaiya And the father of Maharani Mehtab Kaur
- Sada Kaur was the chief of Kanhaiya Misl and the mother-in-law of Maharaja Ranjit Singh
- Baghel Singh, ruler of the Singh Krora Misl
- Sardar Gulab Singh, founder of Dallewalia Misl
- Heera Singh Sandhu, founder of Nakai Misl
- Ran Singh Nakai, third ruler of Nakai Misl
- Karmo Kaur, regent of Nakai Misl
- Datar Kaur Sandhu, princess of Nakai Misl
- Kahan Singh Nakai, last ruler of the Nakai Misl

== Revolutionaries and freedom fighters ==
- Bhai Maharaj Singh
- Bhai Randhir Singh
- Baba Gurdit Singh
- Baba Gurmukh Singh
- Baldev Singh
- Bhagat Singh, also known as "Shaheed-e-Azam", was a charismatic Indian socialist revolutionary whose acts of dramatic violence against the British in India and execution at age 23 made him a folk hero of the Indian independence movement
- Captain Mohan Singh
- Gurdan Saini
- Kartar Singh Sarabha, Indian Sikh revolutionary and the most active member of the Ghadar Party
- Labh Singh Saini
- Teja Singh Samundri
- Udham Singh
- Harnam Singh Saini
- Sardul Singh Kavishar
- Sardar Ajit Singh, Indian revolutionary, uncle of sardar Bhagat Singh
- Dharam Singh Hayatpur, Indian revolutionary, prominent member of the Sikh political and religious group the Babbar Akali Movement in India
- Kartar Singh Jhabbar, Indian revolutionary, Sikh leader known for his role in the Gurdwara Reform Movement of the 1920s
- Ripudaman Singh, Indian revolutionary
- Baba Kharak Singh
- Bhai Balmukund, Indian revolutionary freedom fighter
- Ram Singh, credited as being the first Indian to use non-cooperation and boycott of British merchandise and services as a political weapon.
- Kishan Singh Gargaj
- Sohan Singh Bhakna, Indian revolutionary, the founding president of the Ghadar Party
- Sohan Singh Josh, Indian communist activist and freedom fighter
- Diwan Mulraj Chopra
- Gulab Kaur
- Sunder Singh Lyallpuri, a General of Akali Movement
- Maya Singh Saini
- Jagbir Singh Chhina
- Sadhu Singh Hamdard, well-known freedom fighter and the journalist of Punjab
- Darshan Singh Pheruman, Indian freedom fighter, Sikh activist and politician
- Jaswant Singh Rahi
- Giani Ditt Singh
- Ganda Singh, prominent member of the Ghadar Party
- Teja Singh Swatantar
- Sukhwinder Singh Sangha
- Ishar Singh Marhana, Ghadr revolutionary

== Politicians ==
=== India ===
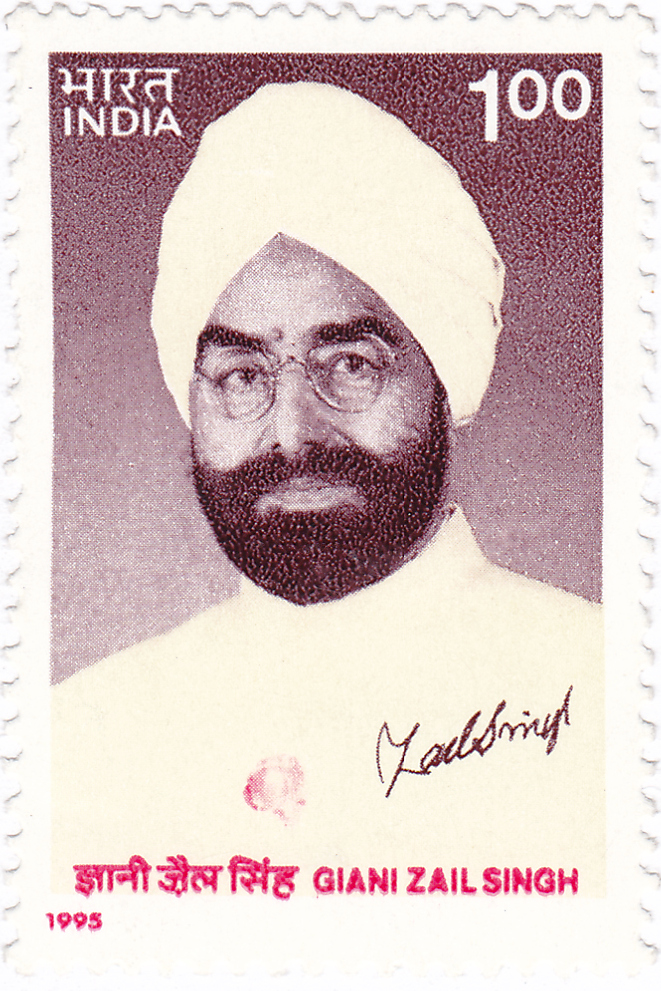
Zail Singh

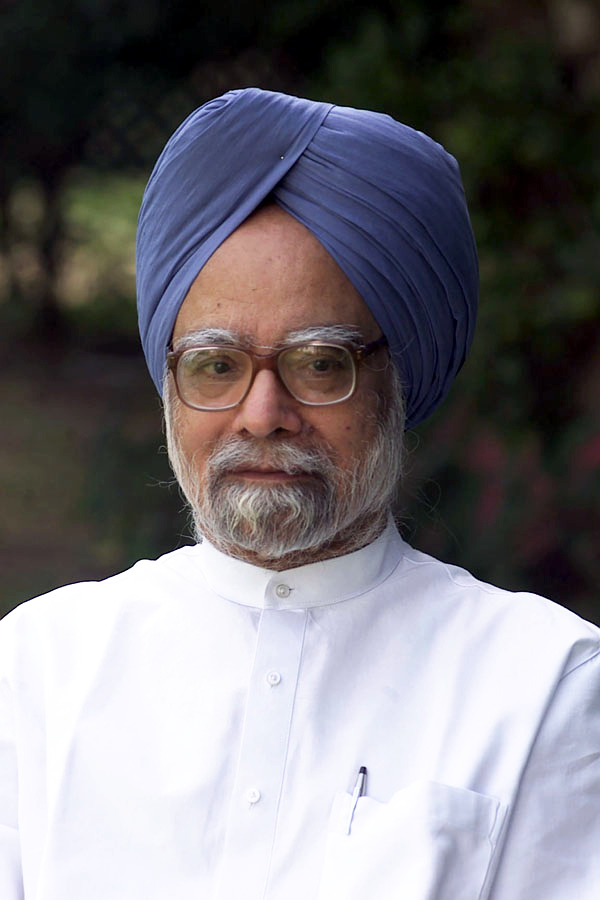
Manmohan Singh

- Amarinder Singh former chief minister of Punjab
- Baldev Singh, first defence minister of India 1947-1952
- Bhagwant Maan current chief Minister of Punjab
- Buta Singh
- Charanjit Singh Channi
- Darbara Singh
- Gurcharan Singh Tohra
- Gurdial Singh Dhillon
- Gurmukh Singh Musafir, Padma Vibhushan, Chief Minister of Punjab 1966-1967
- Harkishan Singh Surjeet
- Harsimrat Kaur Badal
- Manmohan Singh, served as the only non-Hindu Prime Minister of India from 2004 to 2014, becoming the first Sikh head of government in 155 years.
- M. S. Gill, Padma Vibhushan, implemented electronic voting machines as Chief Election Commissioner of India from 1996 to 2001, presided over 2010 Commonwealth Games and associated scandal as Minister of Youth Affairs and Sports from 2008 to 2011.
- Master Tara Singh
- Montek Singh Ahluwalia, Padma Vibhushan, Deputy Chairman, Planning commission of India
- Navjot Singh Sidhu
- Nirmal Singh Kahlon
- Parkash Singh Badal, Padma Vibhushan
- Pratap Singh Bajwa
- Pratap Singh Kairon
- Preneet Kaur Kahlon
- Rajinder Kaur Bhattal
- Sant Fateh Singh
- Sardar Ujjal Singh, former Governor of Punjab and Tamil Nadu
- Sardul Singh Caveeshar
- Simranjit Singh Mann
- Sukhbir Singh Badal
- Sukhjinder Singh Randhawa
- Surinder Singh Bajwa
- Surjit Singh Barnala
- Swaran Singh, Padma Vibhushan, India's second-longest serving cabinet minister; served as Minister of External Affairs 1964-1966 and 1970-1974 and as Minister of Defense 1966-1970 and 1974-1975.
- Varinder Singh Bajwa
- Zail Singh served as President of India from 1982 to 1987, becoming the first Sikh head of state in 133 years.

=== Canada ===
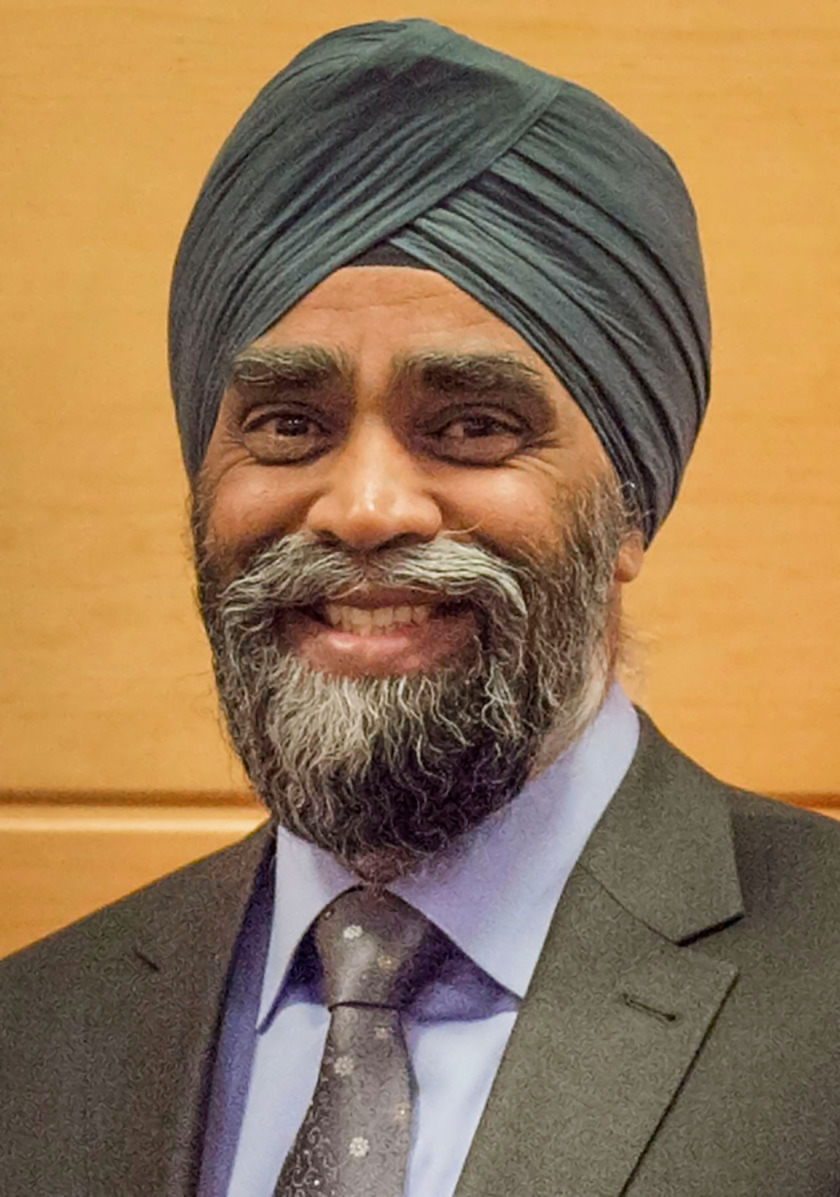
Harjit Sajjan

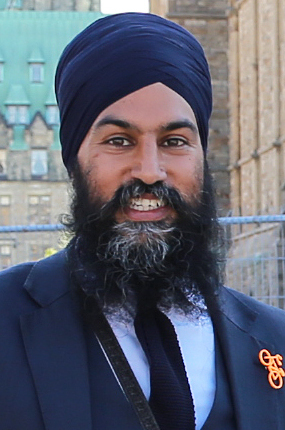
Jagmeet Singh

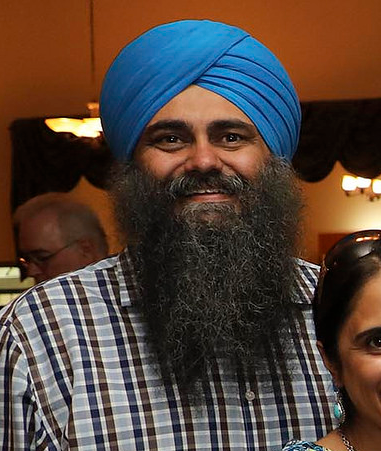
Tim Uppal

- Gurbax Singh Malhi – former Liberal MP
- Amrit Mangat – Liberal MPP, Brampton
- Gulzar Singh Cheema – Manitoba and British Columbia Former MLA
- Gurmant Grewal – former Conservative MP, half (with Nina, listed below)
- Manmeet Singh Bhullar – former Progressive Conservative MLA, Calgary-Greenway, Alberta
- Hardial Bains – founder and leader of the Marxist–Leninist Party of Canada from 1970–1997
- Harinder Takhar – Ontario Liberal MPP and Minister of Transportation
- Harry Bains – British Columbia New Democratic
- Herb Dhaliwal – former Liberal MP and the first Indo-Canadian cabinet minister.
- Jagmeet Singh – Ontario NDP MPP / leader of the Federal New Democratic Party is the first non-White leader of a major federal political party in Canada, having led the New Democratic Party since 2017
- Vic Dhillon – Ontario Liberal MPP
- Harjit Sajjan – Liberal MP, Vancouver South and Minister of National Defence (Canada) served as the first non-White Canadian Minister of National Defence from 2015 to 2021.
- Navdeep Bains – Liberal MP, Minister of Education and Science
- Amarjeet Sohi – Liberal MP, Minister of Infrastructure and Communities
- Bardish Chagger – Liberal MP, Minister of Small Business and Tourism and leader of the Government in the House of Commons
- Ujjal Dosanjh – former Premier of British Columbia, former MPP, former federal Minister of Health
- Prab Gill – MLA, Calgary-Greenway, Alberta
- Tim Uppal became the first turbaned Sikh Canadian cabinet minister in 2011 and is currently deputy leader of the Conservative Party.

=== Pakistan ===
- Mahindar Pall Singh, Sikh MPA, politician and Business man from Multan

=== Fiji ===
- Ujagar Singh Elected to the Legislative Council of Fiji in the 1968, representing the National Federation Party (NFP). He was also a member of independent Fiji's House of Representatives.

=== Kenya ===
- Makhan Singh (trade unionist)
- Sonia Birdi

=== Malaysia ===
- Gobind Singh Deo – Democratic Action Party Central Executive Committee, Current Member of Parliament, Minister of Communications and Multimedia
- Karpal Singh – Chairman of DAP. Member of parliament (aka "Tiger of Jelutong")

=== Mauritius ===
- Kher Jagatsingh – Minister of Education and Minister of Planning & Economic Development (1967-1982)

=== New Zealand ===
- Kanwal Singh Bakshi, Member of Parliament from 2008 (first Indian and first Sikh MP in New Zealand)
- Sukhi Turner, Mayor of Dunedin 1995-2005

=== Philippines ===
- Ramon Bagatsing

=== Singapore ===
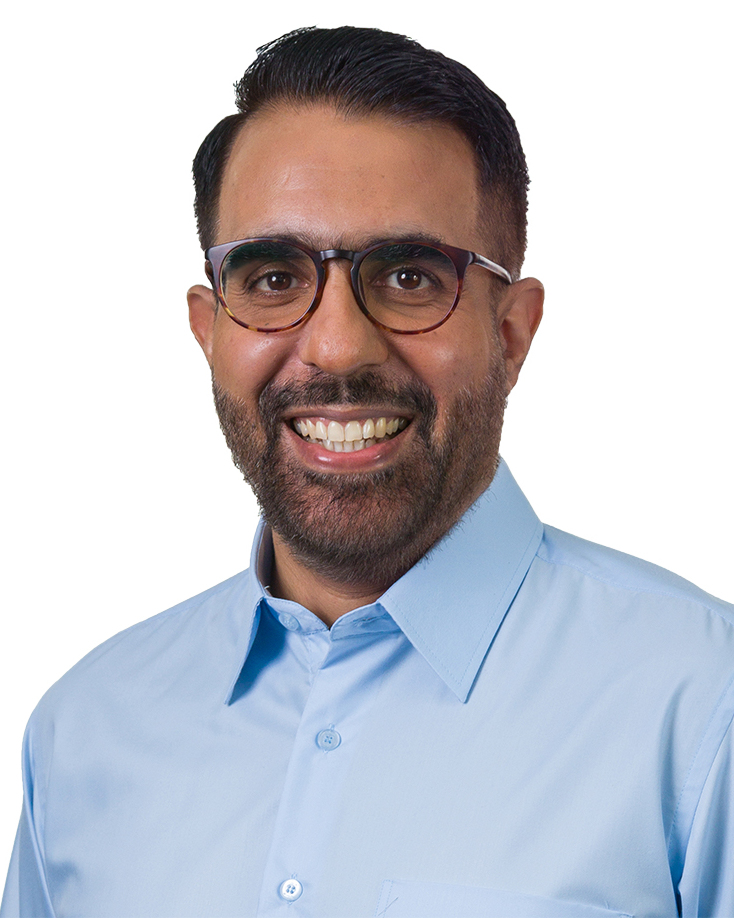
Pritam Singh

- Pritam Singh served as Singapore's first Leader of the Opposition since 2020.

=== Thailand ===
- Santi Thakral

=== United Kingdom ===
- Parmjit Dhanda, former Labour MP
- Tan Dhesi, Labour MP
- Preet Gill, Labour MP
- Indarjit Singh, non-party
- Marsha Singh, former Labour MP
- Parmjit Singh Gill, Liberal Democrats
- Paul Uppal, former Conservative MP

=== United States ===
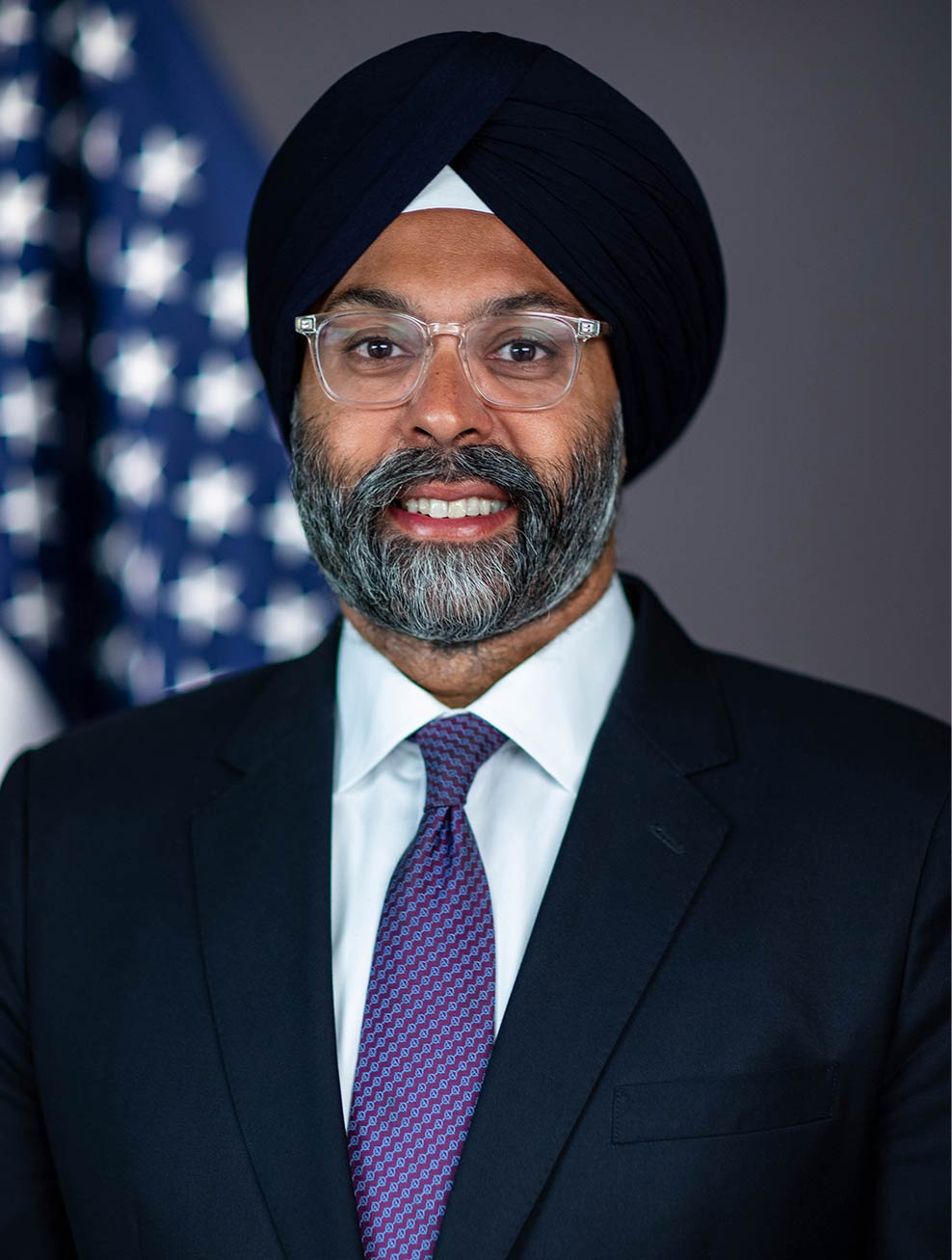
Gurbir Grewal

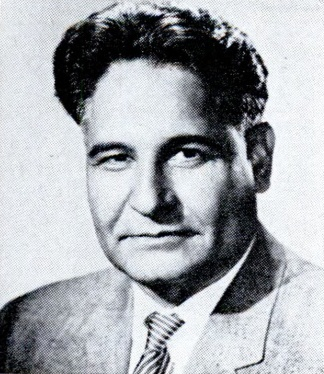
Dalip Singh Saund

- Ravinder Bhalla, New Jersey politician and Hoboken mayor elect
- Preet Bharara (born 1968), former U. S. attorney
- Harmeet Dhillon, Republican Party official in San Francisco
- Preet Didbal, First Sikh Mayor in the United States. Mayor of Yuba City, CA
- Kashmir Gill, banker and former mayor
- Gurbir Grewal, 61st Attorney General of New Jersey served as the first non-White Attorney General of New Jersey from 2018 to 2021.
- Nikki Haley, governor of South Carolina and former UN Ambassador
- Martin Hoke (born 1952), Republican politician
- Dalip Singh Saund (1899–1973), Democrat politician served as the first Asian American in Congress from 1957 to 1963. At the time of his first inauguration, he was the only non-White in Congress.
- G. B. Singh, periodontist and retired army officer
- Bhagat Singh Thind (Bhagat Singh Thind (1892–1967) writer, scientist, and lecturer on spirituality, involved in legal battle over the rights of Indians to obtain U.S. citizenship
- Uday Singh Taunque (1982–2003) soldier, KIA, bronze star recipient

== Religious figures ==
=== Sikh Gurus ===
- Guru Nanak known as Bābā Nānak ('Father Nānak'), was the founder of Sikhism and is the first of the ten Sikh Gurus.
- Guru Angad was the second of the ten Sikh gurus of Sikhism. After meeting Guru Nanak, the founder of Sikhism, becoming a Sikh, and serving and working with Nanak for many years, Nanak gave Lehna the name Angad ("my own limb") and chose Angad as the second Sikh Guru
- Guru Amar Das sometimes spelled as Guru Amardas, was the third of the Ten Gurus of Sikhism and became Sikh Guru on 26 March 1552 at age 73
- Guru Ram Das was the fourth of the ten Sikh gurus. Guru Ram Das is credited with founding and building the city of Amritsar.
- Guru Arjan Dev was the fifth of the ten total Sikh Gurus. He compiled the first official edition of the Sikh scripture called the Adi Granth, which later expanded into the Guru Granth Sahib. He is regarded as the first of the two Gurus martyred in the Sikh faith.
- Guru Hargobind Sahib was the sixth of ten Gurus of the Sikh religion. He had become Guru at the young age of eleven, after the execution of his father, Guru Arjan, by the Mughal emperor Jahangir. Hargobind introduced the process of militarization to Sikhism, He symbolized it by wearing two swords, representing the dual concept of mīrī and pīrī (temporal power and spiritual authority). In front of the Harmandir Sahib in Amritsar, Hargobind constructed the Akal Takht (the throne of the timeless one). The Akal Takht represents the highest seat of earthly authority of the Khalsa (the collective body of the Sikhs) today
- Guru Har Rai was the seventh of the ten Sikh Gurus. He became the Sikh leader at age 14, on 3 March 1644, after the death of his grandfather and the sixth Sikh leader Guru Hargobind.He guided the Sikhs for about seventeen years, till his death at age 31.
- Guru Har Krishan was the eighth of the ten Sikh Gurus. At the age of five, he became the youngest Guru in Sikhism on 7 October 1661. He contracted smallpox in 1664 and died before reaching his eighth birthday. It is said that he died because he contracted smallpox while successfully curing his followers
- Guru Tegh Bahadur was the ninth of ten gurus who founded the Sikh religion and was the leader of Sikhs from 1665 until his beheading in 1675.
- Guru Gobind Singh was the tenth and last human Sikh Guru. He was a warrior, poet, and philosopher. In 1675, at the age of nine he was formally installed as the leader of the Sikhs after his father Guru Tegh Bahadur was executed by Emperor Aurangzeb

=== Panj Pyare (the five beloved ones) ===
- Bhai Daya Singh
- Bhai Mokham Singh
- Bhai Sahib Singh
- Bhai Himmat Singh
- Bhai Dharam Singh

=== Historical importance to Sikh religion ===
- Bhai Mardana (1459–1534) was Guru Nanak Dev's companion on all of his Udasis (travels) and he played kirtan.
- Bebe Nanaki (1464–1518) is known as the first Sikh. She was the elder sister of Guru Nanak Dev, the founder and first Guru (teacher) of Sikhism. Bebe Nanaki was the first to realize her brother's spiritual eminence.
- Sri Chand ( ਸ੍ਰੀ ਚੰਦ )(1494–1629) was the first son of Guru Nanak, raised by his sister. Sri Chand was a renunciate yogi. After his father left Sri Chand stayed in Dera Baba Nanak and maintained Guru Nanak's temple. He established the Udasi order who travelled far and wide to spread the Word of Nanak.
- Mata Khivi ( ਮਾਤਾ ਖੀਵੀ ) (1506–1582) is the only woman mentioned in the Siri Guru Granth Sahib. She was the wife of Guru Angad, and established the langar system, a free kitchen where all people were served as equals. Only the best possible ingredients were used, and everyone was treated with utmost courtesy. Her hospitality has been emulated over the centuries and has become the first cultural identity of the Sikhs. She helped her husband to establish the infant Sikh community on a stronger footing, and is described as good natured, efficient, and beautiful.
- Baba Buddha (6 October 1506 – 8 September 1631) was one of the earliest disciples of Guru Nanak. He lived an exemplary life and was called on to perform the ceremony passing the guruship on to five gurus, up to Guru Hargobind. Baba Buddha trained the sixth Guru in martial arts as a young man to prepare him for the challenges of the guruship.
- Bhai Gurdas ( ਭਾਈ ਗੁਰਦਾਸ ) (1551–1637) is one of the most eminent literary personalities in the history of the Sikh religion. He was a scholar, poet and the scribe of the Adi Granth. He was an able missionary and an accomplished theologian. Being well versed in Indian religious thought, he was able to elaborate profoundly the tenets of Sikhism.
- Mata Gujri (1624–1705) joined the ninth Guru in his long meditation at Baba Bakala before he assumed the guruship. She gave birth to and raised the tenth guru, Guru Gobind Singh. Mata Gujri accompanied her youngest grandsons, Baba Fateh Singh and Baba Zorawar Singh to their martyrdom at Sirhind-Fategarh, and subsequently passed as well.
- Mai Bhago (ਮਾਈ ਭਾਗੋ) is one of the most famous women in Sikh history. She is always pictured on horseback wearing a turban with her headscarf gracefully flowing in the wind, courageously leading an army into battle. A staunch Sikh by birth and upbringing, she was distressed to hear in 1705 that some of the Sikhs of her village who had gone to Anandpur to fight for Guru Gobind Singh had deserted him under adverse conditions. She rallied the deserters, persuading them to meet the Guru and apologize to him. She led them back to Guru Gobind Singh in the battlefield at Muktsar (Khidrana) Punjab. She thereafter stayed on with Guru Gobind Singh as one of his bodyguards, in male attire. After Guru Gobind Singh left his body at Nanded in 1708, she retired further south. She settled in Jinvara, where, immersed in meditation, she lived to an old age.
- Bhai Mani Singh (1644–1738) was an 18th-century Sikh scholar and martyr. He was a childhood companion of Guru Gobind Singh[1] and took the vows of Sikhism when the Guru inaugurated the Khalsa in March 1699. Soon after that, the Guru sent him to Amritsar to take charge of the Harmandar, which had been without a custodian since 1696. He took control and steered the course of Sikh destiny at a critical stage in Sikh history. The nature of his death in which he was dismembered joint by joint has become a part of the daily Sikh Ardas (prayer).
- Maharaja Ranjit Singh (1780–1839) was the leader of the Sikh Empire which ruled the northwest Indian subcontinent in the early half of the 19th century. Ranjit Singh's reign introduced reforms, modernization, investment into infrastructure, and general prosperity. His government and army included Sikhs, Hindus, Muslims and Europeans. Ranjit Singh's legacy includes a period of Sikh cultural and artistic renaissance, including the rebuilding of the Harimandir Sahib in Amritsar as well as other major gurudwaras, including Takht Sri Patna Sahib, Bihar and Hazur Sahib Nanded, Maharashtra under his sponsorship. He was popularly known as Sher-i-Punjab, or "Lion of Punjab".
- Bhagat Puran Singh ( ਭਗਤ ਪੁਰਨ ਸਿੰਘ )(1904–1992) was a great visionary, an accomplished environmentalist and a symbol of selfless service to humanity. He was the founder of the All India Pingalwara charitable society which imparts service to the poor, downtrodden, the dying, and the mentally and physically handicapped people.

=== Martyrs ===
- Guru Arjun Dev was the first of two Guru's martyred in Sikh faith and fifth of the ten total Sikh Gurus
- Guru Tegh Bahadur was the second of two Guru's martyred in Sikh faith and ninth of the ten total Sikh Gurus]]
- Bhai Dayala also known as Bhai Dyal Das was an early martyr in Sikhism. He was martyred in Delhi. 1675 along with his Sikh companions Bhai Mati Das and Bhai Sati Das and the ninth Guru Tegh Bahadur ji.
- Bhai Mati Das was an early martyr in Sikhism. He was martyred in Delhi in 1675 along with his younger brother Bhai Sati Das and companion Bhai Dayala and the ninth Guru Tegh Bahadur ji,
- Bhai Sati Das was an early martyr in Sikhism. He was martyred in Delhi in 1675 along with his elder brother Bhai Mati Das and companion Bhai Dayala and the ninth Guru Tegh Bahadur ji
- Baba Ajit Singh ji was the eldest son of Guru Gobind Singh Ji. He was martyred in battle during second battle of chamkaur along with his younger brother Jujhar Singh Ji,
- Baba Jujhar Singh Ji was the second son of Guru Gobind Singh ji. He was martyred in battle during second battle of chamkaur along with his elder brother Baba Ajit Singh ji
- Baba Zorawar Singh was the third son of Guru Gobind Singh Ji. He and his younger brother Baba Fateh Singh are among the most hallowed martyr in Sikhism.
- Baba Fateh Singh was the fourth and youngest son of Guru Gobind Singh He and his elder brother Baba Zorawar Singh are among the most hallowed martyrs in Sikhism
- Banda Singh Bahadur was a Sikh warrior and a commander of Khalsa army. He was among the most hallowed martyrs in Sikhism. Baba Banda Singh Bahadur was executed at Delhi on 9 June 1716
- Baba Deep Singh is revered among Sikhs as one of the most hallowed martyrs in Sikhism
- Bhai Mani Singh was one of the most hallowed martyrs in Sikhism. Bhai Mani Singh was executed in Nakhaas chowk in Lahore in December 1738 ca.the Nakhaas chowk since known as Shaheed Ganj- The place of Martyrdom
- Bhai Taru Singh was a prominent Sikh martyr known for sacrificing his life, in the name of protecting Sikh values, by having had his head scalped rather than Cutting his hair and converting to Islam.
- Kartar Singh Sarabha was an Indian revolutionary
- Bhagat Singh Lahore 1931
- Udham Singh Barnsbury, England, 1940
- Fauja Singh Amritsar, 1979

=== Other Religious Figures ===
- Bhai Kanhaiya
- Bhai Daya Singh
- Bhai Dharam Singh
- Bhai Himmat Singh
- Bhai Mohkam Singh
- Bhai Sahib Singh
- Bhai Nand Lal
- Baba Sahib Singh Bedi
- Bhai Maharaj Singh
- Sant Baba Isher Singh
- Sant Baba Nand Singh
- Randhir Singh
- Babaji Singh
- Thaminder Singh Anand

=== Gurbani Keertan ===
- Bhai Nirmal Singh Khalsa – Performer of Sikh Keertan at Harimandir Sahib
- Singh Kaur – Composer and performer of Sikh Keertan and New-age music
- Snatam Kaur – Performer of Sikh Keertan and New-age music

== Cause celebre ==
- Jasleen Kaur harassment controversy
- Jagtar Singh Johal
- Surjit Athwal
- Jaswinder Kaur Sidhu

== See also ==
- List of British Sikhs
- List of Canadian Sikhs
