= Raju Vaishya =

Indian researcher

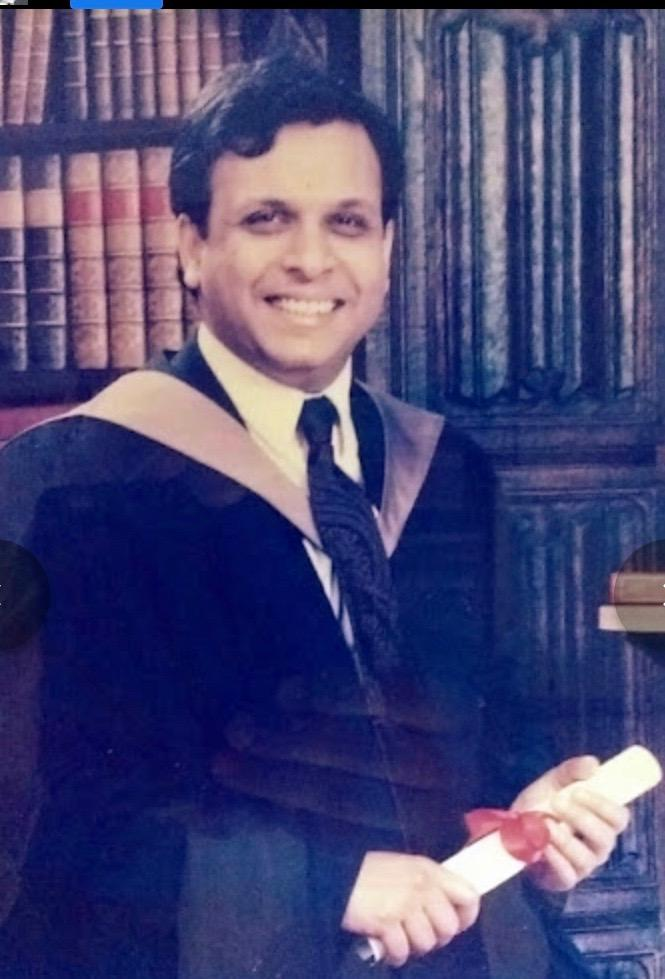

Raju Vaishya is an Indian researcher with contributions in the field of orthopaedics. He is former president and founder member of Indian Cartilage Society (2018–19) and Founder President of Arthritis Care Foundation. He has established a center for Autologous Chondrocyte Implantation (ACI) at Indraprastha Apollo Hospitals, New Delhi, India. Instrumental (PSI) in starting the first cartilage club in Delhi, to enhance the awareness about the cartilage science and regenerative treatments used in Orthopaedics. He has the credit of doing the first preplan patient specific instruments (PSI) total knee arthroplasty, in Northern India in May 2013.

== Education and career ==
He has done his MBBS and MS (Orthopaedics) from Jiwaji University, Gwalior, India. He went on to complete his MCh (Orthopaedics) from Liverpool University, England., in 1990. Further, in 2012, he acquired his FRCS from Royal College of Surgeons of England, and PG (DHA) from Apollo Med Varsity, India. He is also a Fellow of American College of Surgeons (FACS). He did specialized higher surgical training in joint replacement & arthroscopic surgery at Robert Jones & Agnes Hunt Orthopaedic Hospitals, Oswestry & Royal Liverpool Children's Hospitals, UK.

Vaishya was the Chairman of IT, e-library and Web resource Committee, and Basic Science and Research committee of Indian Orthopaedic Association. He performed the first pre plan PSI total knee arthroplasty, in Northern India in May 2013. He was the only person from the Indian subcontinent to be invited as a faculty member for the UK Cartilage club meeting in London (November 2012). He has more than 300 research-based publications and several chapters in the textbooks to his credit, in peer-reviewed and indexed medical journals. He is the Editor-in-Chief of the Journal of Clinical Orthopaedics and Trauma.

He is working on 3-D printing in Orthopaedics, Cartilage regeneration & restoration techniques like Autologous Chondrocyte Implantation, etc. He has established a center for ACI at Apollo Hospital, New Delhi. He was invited as a faculty member for the UK Cartilage club meeting in London in Nov 2012.

== Books published ==
- Vaishya R. “Kamar Dard.” book for the general public.
- Vaishya R, Vaish A. Knee Osteoarthritis. Publisher: Kontexworx, New Delhi, India.
- Vaishya R, Maini L, Haleem A. An update on Medical 3D printing. Publisher: SALUBRIS, Noida, India. Nov. 2019

== Research and publications ==
He led a study on osteoporotic fracture risk in urban Indian population using quantitative ultrasonography & FRAX tool among 445 people living in different areas of New Delhi. Results of the study was published in Indian Journal of Medical Research in 2018.

He published a research paper with Heterotopic Ossification of Tendo Achilles: An Uncommon Clinical Entity in Journal of Orthopaedic Case Reports, an international, peer-reviewed journal.

His research paper on Early exploration of radial nerve with secondary injuries in humeral shaft fractures published in Journal of Clinical Orthopaedics and Trauma.

Will 3D printing take away surgical planning from doctors? (Editorial) J Clin Orthop Trauma 2018; 9 (3):194-201.

- Artificial Intelligence (AI) applications for COVID-19 pandemic

== Awards ==
- Dr. B.C. Roy Oration Award and gold medal for 2018, for Academic Excellence, by the IMA MP State Chapter, Jabalpur (October 2018)
- “Distinguished Researcher” award of Apollo Group of Hospitals (February 2019)
- Pride of Asia International Award,” for outstanding achievements and remarkable role in the field of Healthcare, Bangkok, Thailand (October, 2018)
- Honored by IMA, Gwalior through a Citation Award for outstanding services to the society on Doctor's day, 1 July 2010.
- SIEMENS-GAPIO innovation award in Medicine, Mumbai
- Best paper publication awards.
- Distinguished Researcher Ward.
