= Government Medical College, Patiala =

Medical college in Punjab, India

Coordinates: 30.3281°N 76.3862°E

- Motto: ਰੋਗੁ ਦਾਰੂ ਦੋਵੈ ਬੁਝੈ ਤਾ ਵੈਦੁ ਸੁਜਾਣੁ
- Motto in English: If someone understands both the disease and the medicine, only then is he a wise physician
- Type: Government
- Established: 1953; 73 years ago
- Affiliations: Baba Farid University of Health Sciences, NMC
- Director-Principal: Dr. Raminderpal Singh Sibia
- Administrative staff: 44
- Location: Patiala, Punjab, India
- Campus: Urban
- Nickname: GMC Patiala
- Website: gmcpatiala.edu.in

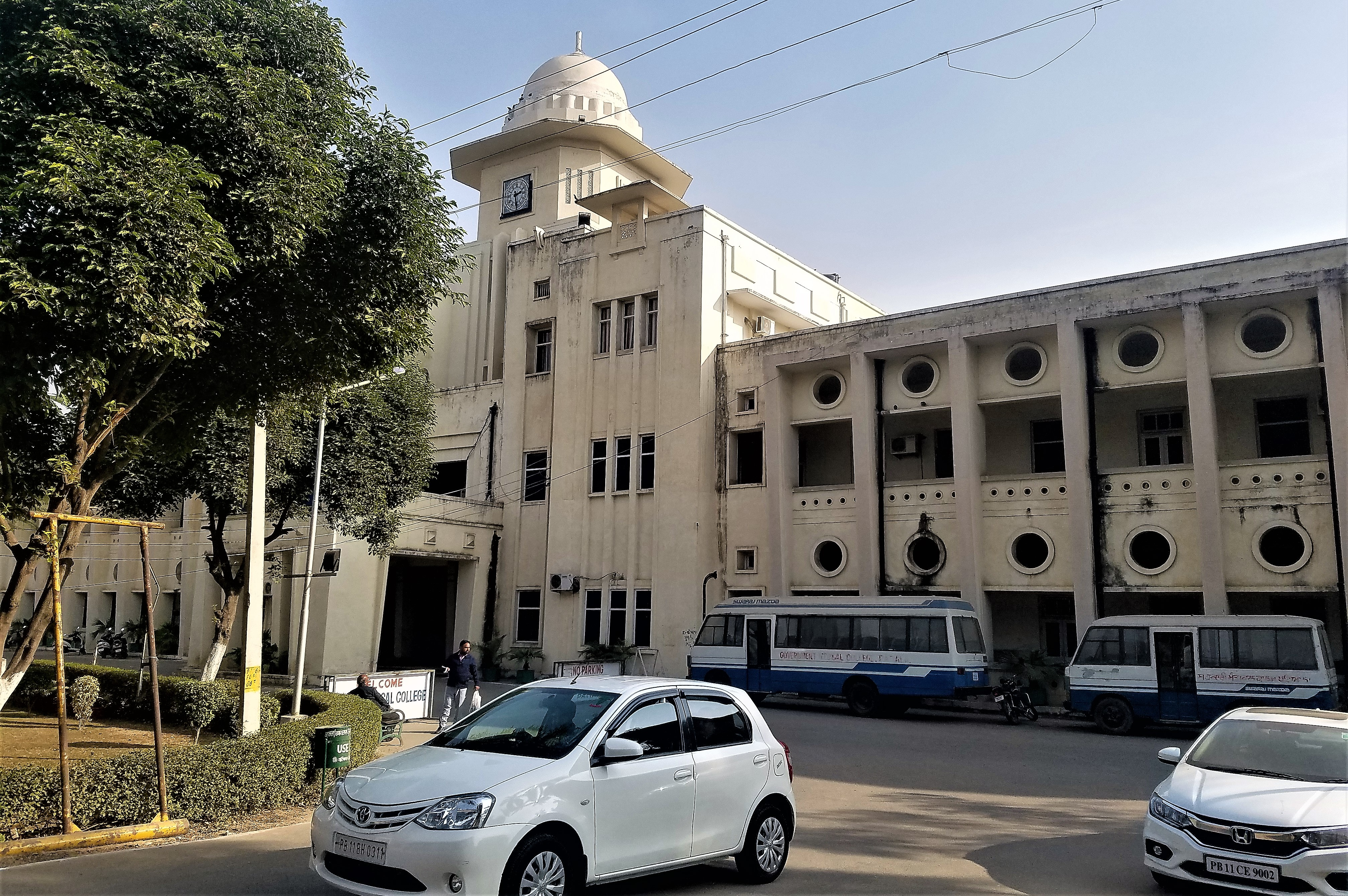
GMC Patiala campus

Government Medical College, Patiala is a public medical college located in Patiala, in the state of Punjab, India. It is the second-oldest medical college in the state.

== History ==
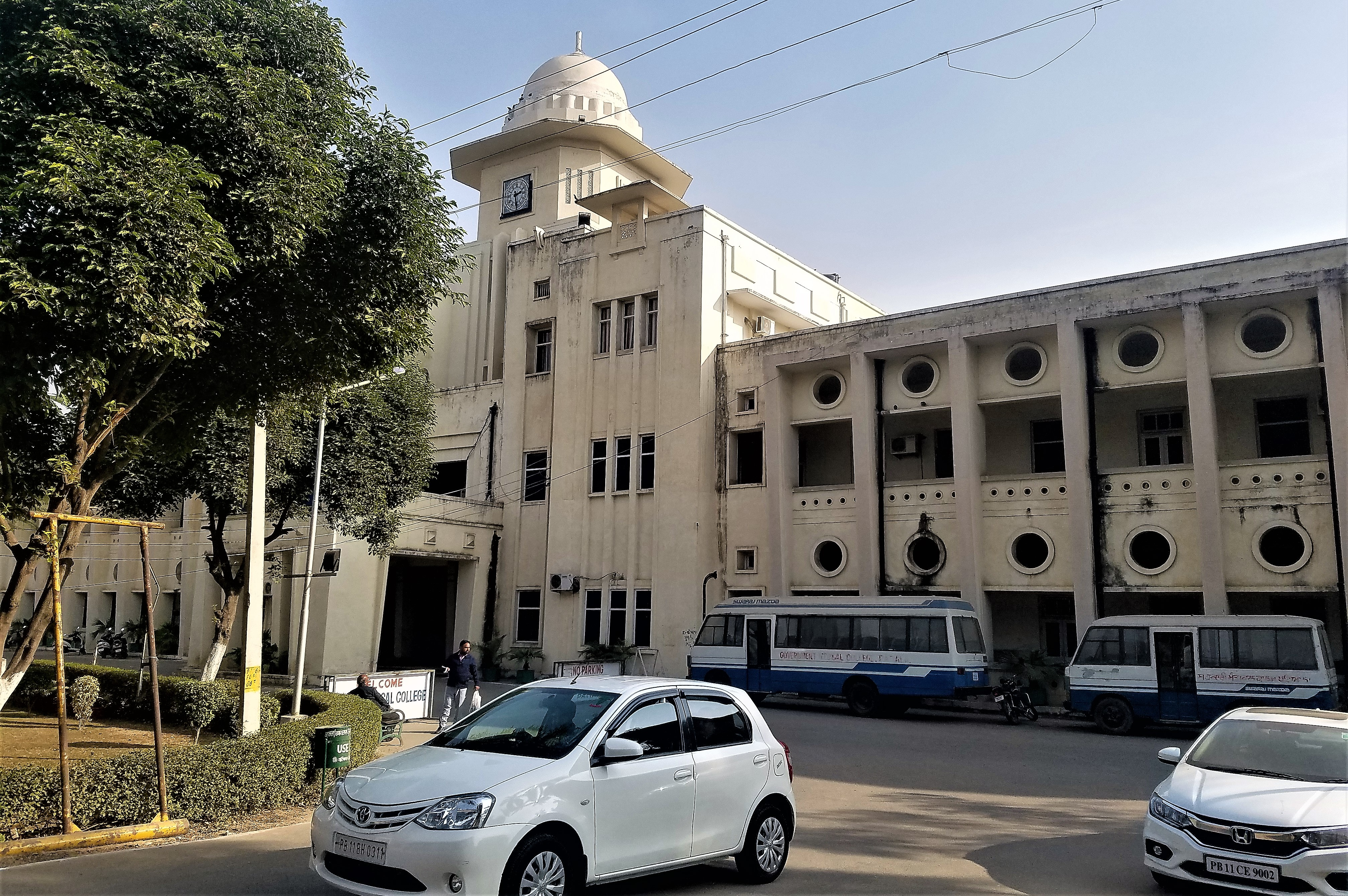
GMC Patiala campus

Government Medical College, Patiala was proposed in October 1951 by the Patiala and East Punjab States Union government, under the First Five-Year Plan. The first batch was started on 29 September 1953. The classes initially started from the old building of the Rajindra Hospital, which later shifted to the Archives Department, about 2 kilometers from its current location. With the construction of the new Rajindra Hospital in 1953 the old hospital building was made available to house some of the offices of the PEPSU state.

Currently the Archives Department is housed in the Rajindra Hospital, which was built in 1877 and opened in January 1883. The nearby Dufferin Hospital started construction in November 1888 and opened in October 1890.

The Rajindra Hospital is named after Maharaja Sir Rajinder Singh and it receives a notable mention in 1908 by The Imperial Gazetteer of India as the Rajindra Hospital. The hospital was known as Rajindra Hospital in pre-independence era, was sometimes mentioned as Rajendra Hospital, and currently uses the name Rajindra Hospital.

With its attached 1009-bed Rajindra Hospital + 121-bed TB hospital is one of the largest health institutions in the region.

The attached central clinical laboratory with facilities for hematology, pathology, microbiology, biochemistry is known as Bhupindra Clinical Laboratory.

== Location and campus ==
The college consists of an administrative block and self-contained blocks for the basic clinical departments. The college maintains a library, computer centre and a reading room.

== Affiliated hospitals ==
Rajindra Hospital, Patiala with 1009 beds was attached to the college in early 1951. The hospital was equipped with all the latest apparatus and instruments to make it fit for imparting clinical teaching to the students. Two well designed, spacious and well lighted lecture theatres equipped with arrangements for epidiascopes projections and audio visual aids were provided on the hospital side in addition to four lecture theatres of similar design on college side for basic departments.

The department of Tuberculosis and Respiratory Medicine/Pulmonary Medicine is located in a separate campus, known as the Tuberculosis Centre, Patiala which started functioning on 25 July 1953 with 22 observation beds, 11 for male and 11 for female patients with Tuberculosis. It is popularly known as TB Hospital or Padma Shri Dr. Khushdeva Singh Chest Diseases Hospital, and currently has a capacity of 121 beds. Primary health centres at Bhadson, Kauli and Tripuri are attached with this college for teaching purposes.

There are three hostels, two for girls and one for boys. In addition to this there is one hostel in the Rajindra Hospital also for Doctors/Interns/House surgeons. The college has a very spacious auditorium, big play ground and an open-air theatre.

The college is governed by Director Research and Medical Education, Punjab and is affiliated to Baba Farid University of Health Sciences, Faridkot.

== University ==
Govt. Medical College Patiala is affiliated to Baba Farid University of Health Sciences Faridkot, Established in the memory of great Sufi Saint Baba Farid by Punjab government in July, 1900 by an Act of the State Legislature, which was established in 1999.

== Notable physicians ==
- Khushdeva Singh
- Sohan Hayreh
- Dr. K. D. Singh
- Amandev Singh
- Karanvir Singh
