= Indian Orthopaedic Association =

Indian orthopedic organization

- Formation: 1955
- Headquarters: New Delhi, India
- Website: www.ioaindia.org

The Indian Orthopaedic Association was founded in 1955 and as on 2013 had over 9,000 members.

== History ==
The first surgeons who focused on orthopedic surgeries in India were Dr. R J Katrak, Dr. N S Narasimha Aiyar and Dr. S R Chandra. After World War II, Dr. Mukhopadhaya and Dr. K S Grewal suggested forming an association during the annual conference of ASI in Vellore in 1952. Many practicing surgeons met in Agra in 1953, most prominently Katrak, Dr. B N Sinha, Grewal, Mukopadhaya and Dr. A K Gupta. They agreed to form an orthopedic section of ASI. However, in 1954, the general body of the ASI at Hyderabad rejected the proposal.

The society was officially formed in Amritsar at an ASI meeting in December 1955. Dr. B N Sinha and Dr. Mukopadhaya were unanimously elected president and secretary. Dr. A K Talwalkar started the Johnson & Johnson and the Smith & Nephew traveling fellowships on behalf of IOA. The annual Kini Memorial Oration started in 1958. Sir Harry Platt served as the first Orator in 1958. The members of the Association published the first issue of a journal in 1967 with Prakash Chandra as the Editor. A constitution prepared by a select committee was unanimously approved at the General Body meeting in 1967. This was later registered under the Indian Societies Act.

At the 1986 Agra ASI conference, the IOA became independent of ASI. Sixteen regional chapters were formed.

== Sub Specialty Societies ==
- Trauma Societies of India
- P.O.S.I
- Implant Committee
- A.S.S.I
- ASAMI India
- Oncology section of IOA
- Indian Arthroplasty
- Indian Foot & Ankle
- Indian Shoulder & Elbow
- Hand Section of IOA
- Indian Arthroscopy Society
- Computer Assisted Ortho. Surgery Society
- APASI
- Indian Orthopaedic Rheumatology Association
- Basic Sciences
- Orthopaedics Research and Education Foundation, India

== State Chapters ==
- Andhra Pradesh
- Bihar
- Chhattisgarh
- Delhi
- Gujarat
- Himachal Pradesh
- Karnataka
- Kerala
- Madhya Pradesh
- Maharashtra
- Nerosa
- Odisha
- Punjab
- Rosa
- Tamil Nadu
- Uttar Pradesh
- Uttrakhand
- West Bengal
- Telangana
