= Sohan Hayreh =

American ophthalmologist (1927–2022)

Sohan Singh Hayreh (November 6, 1927 – September 29, 2022) was an ophthalmologist, clinical scientist, and professor emeritus of ophthalmology at the University of Iowa. As one of the pioneers in the field of fluorescein angiography, he was generally acknowledged to be a leading authority in vascular diseases of the eye and the optic nerve. For over 60 years, Hayreh was actively involved in basic, experimental, and clinical research in ophthalmology, publishing over 400 original peer-reviewed articles in various international ophthalmic journals, six classical monographs and books in his field of research, and more than 50 chapters in ophthalmic books. He made many seminal observations dealing with the ocular circulation in health and disease, the optic disc and the optic nerve, retinal and choroidal vascular disorders, glaucomatous optic neuropathy, fundus changes in malignant arterial hypertension, ocular neovascularization, rheumatologic disorders of the eye, and nocturnal arterial hypotension. He was an elected fellow of the National Academy of Medical Sciences.

== Biography ==
=== Early life in India ===
Sohan Singh Hayreh at the ceremony (12 June 2009) where he received an honorary fellowship from the Royal College of Ophthalmologists in London.

Hayreh was born in the small village of Littran in the Indian state of Punjab. As the eldest son in a Jatt Sikh farming family, his mother decided he should go to medical school because there were no physicians in the area and no medical help was available when anyone in the family was ill. In 1946, he started his medical education at King Edward Medical College at Lahore, which is in current-day Pakistan. However, due to the partition of India in 1947, Hayreh, along with the college's other non-Muslim students had to leave Lahore. He was able to finish his medical degree in Amritsar, which held the only other available medical college in his home state of Punjab.

After graduating from medical school and initial training in general surgery, he decided to join the Indian Army Medical Corps on a short service commission; where part of the time he worked as a general surgeon. He served most of his three years with the army in rough field conditions near the India–Pakistan border. After his commitment to the army had ended, he was anxious to pursue an academic and research career. In 1955, he accepted the only available academic position available, which was in the anatomy department in the newly opened Government Medical College, Patiala.

=== Research career in Britain and beyond ===
In his research, Hayreh “challenged and changed conventional wisdom” in the field of his research in ophthalmology. His first research project while at the Government Medical College was to confirm the findings by Jules Francois and A. Neetens of the existence of the central artery of the optic nerve; Hayreh found instead that the artery did not exist.

In 1961, Hayreh was the first Indian awarded the highly prestigious Beit Memorial Research Fellowship in Medical Sciences at the University of London to investigate the pathogenesis of optic disc edema when the intracranial pressure is elevated. During his fellowship, he was mentored by Sir Stewart Duke-Elder, the prominent British ophthalmologist.

At the end of his three years as Beit Memorial Research Fellow, Hayreh had to decide whether to "go back to India and say good-bye to any serious ophthalmic research for lack of facilities and funds, or stay and try to make a career in British ophthalmology". He decided to stay in England and pursued a career in research, clinical ophthalmology and teaching. After spending one year as a senior house officer at Birmingham & Midland Eye Hospital, Hayreh returned to the Institute of Ophthalmology, University of London, in 1965, this time as lecturer in clinical ophthalmology. His research at this time dealt mostly with the in vivo blood supply of the optic nerve head and glaucoma.

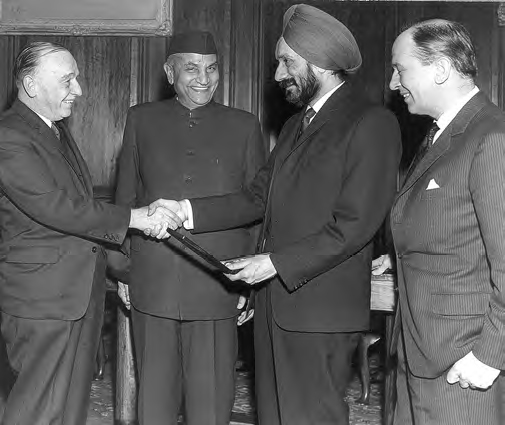
Presentation of Watumull Prize for outstanding contribution to Medical Research by the Watumull Trust, Honolulu. India House (Indian Embassy), London, 1964.

In 1969, Hayreh took the position as senior lecturer (later reader) in ophthalmology at the University of Edinburgh and also worked as consultant ophthalmologist to the Edinburgh Royal Infirmary. While in Edinburgh, Hayreh met his future wife, Shelagh Henderson, the administrator of the Eye Pavilion of the Edinburgh Royal Infirmary. Hayreh credited his wife as instrumental in the editing and preparation of his publications.

In 1973, Hayreh was invited to join the University of Iowa's Department of Ophthalmology, where he remained as both professor of ophthalmology and director of the Ocular Vascular Division at the University of Iowa Hospitals and Clinics until his death. In 1987, the University of London awarded him the degree of Doctor of Science in Medicine for his seminal published work in the field of ocular circulation in health and disease and optic nerve disorders.

In 2018, Hayreh was featured as a Living Legend in Ophthalmology by Indian Journal of Ophthalmology.

== Selected publications ==
- Hayreh, Sohan Singh (1968). "Pathogenesis of oedema of the optic disc". Documenta Ophthalmologica. 24 (2): 289–411. doi:10.1007/BF02550944. PMID 4972870. S2CID 31790702.
- Hayreh, S S (1969). "Blood supply of the optic nerve head and its role in optic atrophy, glaucoma, and oedema of the optic disc". British Journal of Ophthalmology. 53 (11): 721–48. doi:10.1136/bjo.53.11.721. PMC 506749. PMID 4982590.
- Hayreh, S S (1974). "Anterior ischaemic optic neuropathy. III. Treatment, prophylaxis, and differential diagnosis". British Journal of Ophthalmology. 58 (12): 981–9. doi:10.1136/bjo.58.12.981. PMC 1215077. PMID 4376417.
- Hayreh, SS; Kolder, HE; Weingeist, TA (1980). "Central retinal artery occlusion and retinal tolerance time". Ophthalmology. 87 (1): 75–8. doi:10.1016/S0161-6420(80)35283-4. PMID 6769079.
- Hayreh, SS (1983). "Classification of central retinal vein occlusion". Ophthalmology. 90 (5): 458–74. doi:10.1016/s0161-6420(83)34530-9. PMID 6877778.
- Beck, RW; Servais, GE; Hayreh, SS (1987). "Anterior ischemic optic neuropathy. IX. Cup-to-disc ratio and its role in pathogenesis". Ophthalmology. 94 (11): 1503–8. doi:10.1016/S0161-6420(87)33263-4. PMID 3684223.
- Hayreh, Sohan Singh (1991). "Adventure in three worlds". Survey of Ophthalmology. 35 (4): 317–24. doi:10.1016/0039-6257(91)90054-J. PMID 2011827.
- Hayreh, SS; Zimmerman, MB; Podhajsky, P; Alward, WL (1994). "Nocturnal arterial hypotension and its role in optic nerve head and ocular ischemic disorders". American Journal of Ophthalmology. 117 (5): 603–24. doi:10.1016/s0002-9394(14)70067-4. PMID 8172267.
- Hayreh, SS; Podhajsky, PA; Raman, R; Zimmerman, B (1997). "Giant cell arteritis: Validity and reliability of various diagnostic criteria". American Journal of Ophthalmology. 123 (3): 285–96. doi:10.1016/s0002-9394(14)70123-0. PMID 9063237.
- Hayreh, Sohan Singh (2009). "Ischemic optic neuropathy". Progress in Retinal and Eye Research. 28 (1): 34–62. doi:10.1016/j.preteyeres.2008.11.002. PMID 19063989. S2CID 41796396.
- Hayreh, Sohan Singh (2015). Ocular Vascular Occlusive Disorders | SpringerLink. Springer International. doi:10.1007/978-3-319-12781-1. ISBN 978-3-319-12780-4.
