= Vishavjit Singh =

American Sikh Cartoonist

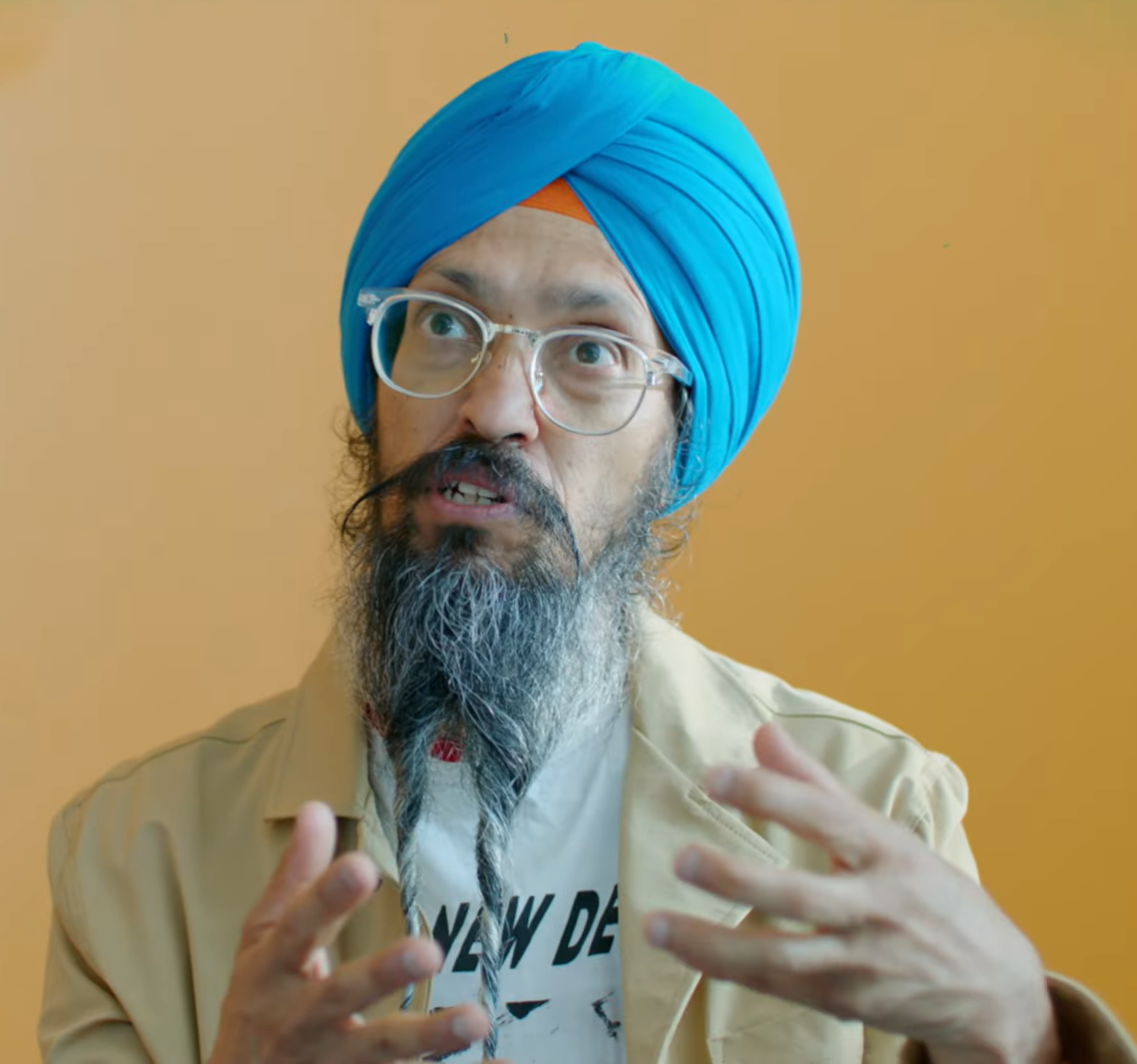
- Singh in 2024
- Born: Washington, D.C.
- Occupations: Cartoonist; Activist

Vishavjit Singh is an American cartoonist, author, and activist. Singh garnered international attention for his persona, "Sikh Captain America", which he used to not only combat hate speech and discrimination but to also raise awareness around the Sikh community.

== Biography ==
Singh was born in Washington, DC in the early 1970s to Sikh parents, one of whom worked in the Indian Embassy. In 1975, Singh's family moved from nearby Hyattsville, Maryland to Delhi, India.

While he was attending middle school in India, two of Indira Gandhi's Sikh bodyguards assassinated her. Through the actions of a Hindu neighbor, Singh's family escaped the Hindu gang violence of the ensuing anti-Sikh riots in which thousands of Sikhs were killed. The memories of these pogroms left a lasting effect on Singh.

After high school, Singh relocated to Los Angeles where he encountered ridicule of his Sikh appearance. While attending college at the University of California, Santa Barbara, Singh felt inundated with being stereotyped and subsequently doffed his turban and cut his long hair, unshorn since birth. He later obtained a master's degree in public health at University of California, Berkeley. In 2000, Singh relocated to the East Coast of the United States to work as a software engineer. After exploring philosophy and other religions, he came back to Sikhism and began wearing his turban again in August 2001.

After the September 11, 2001 attacks, Singh started to draw comics as a way to promote tolerance. He frequently drew upon his own experiences of being discriminated against as a Sikh for his comics. In 2002, he started his own comic website.

In 2011, Singh went to New York Comic Con where he unveiled his newest poster creation - Sikh Captain America - a variation on Captain America but with a dastar turban and beard. After the 2012 Wisconsin Sikh temple shooting, Singh was inspired to do something to combat hate crimes and discrimination, especially against Sikh. He wrote an op-ed in the Seattle Times about how superhero narratives can combat hate speech. Singh also decided to embody his 2011 creation by cosplaying as Sikh Captain America as a way to start conversations on tolerance and raise awareness about the Sikh community. Singh was interviewed on December 1, 2013, about his Sikh Captain America by Melissa Harris-Perry. When Singh was cosplaying Sikh Captain America he met then film students Ryan Westra, Ben Fischinger and Matthew Rogers. The students pitched an idea to Singh that would later become the 2014 movie short "Red, White, and Beard," where he would walk around New York City for three whole days and that they would film his experience.

In 2016, Singh was featured in "The Sikh Project,” a pop-up gallery exhibit in SoHo that highlighted 38 portraits of Sikh-American men and women. In 2018, Singh contributed to the New York's Smithsonian Asian Pacific American Center exhibit “CTRL+ALT: A Culture Lab on Imagined Futures." Singh had his exhibit “Wham! Bam! Pow! – Cartoons, Turbans & Confronting Hate” on view at the Wing Luke Museum from May 4, 2018, to February 24, 2019. Singh is also featured in the 2022 anthology We Are Here: 30 Inspiring Asian Americans and Pacific Islanders Who Have Shaped the United States by Naomi Hirahara and published by the Smithsonian Institution and Running Press Kids.

In 2023, Singh's documentary American Sikh was showcased at Chicago International Film Festival.
