= Mahindar Pall Singh =

Pakistani politician

Member of the Provincial Assembly of Punjab
- In office 15 August 2018 – 14 January 2023
- Constituency: Reserved seat for minorities

Personal details
- Party: PTI (2018-present)
- Children: 3
- Nickname: Veer Ji

Mahindar Pall Singh (Urdu: مہندر پال سنگھ) is a Pakistani politician who had been member of the Provincial Assembly of Punjab from August 2018 till January 2023.

== Political career ==
He was elected to Provincial Assembly of Punjab on a reserved seat for minorities in the 2018 Pakistani general election representing Pakistan Tehreek-e-Insaf.

Singh belongs to the Sikh community of Pakistan. He is the second Sikh to become a member of Punjab's provincial assembly, and hails from Nankana Sahib but lives in Multan. He is famous business man of Sikh community of Multan. He is elected as minority MPA in 2018 election on PTI ticket and became first Sikh MPA in Multan.
