= Santi Thakral =

Thai judge and privy councillor

Santi Thakral (Thai: สันติ ทักราล; RTGS: Santi Thak-ran; 1942–2011) was a member of the Privy Council of King Bhumibol Adulyadej of Thailand. Prior to becoming Privy Councillor, he was President of the Supreme Court of Thailand.

== Early life and education ==
Santi Thakral was born to a Sikh merchant family in the northern Thai province of Phrae. He studied at Bangkok's Assumption College and Assumption Commercial College before completing his LL.B. at Thammasat University. He also has an M.A. in Political Science from Thammasat University. He has received training from the Academy of American and International Law at Southern Methodist University, the National Judicial College at the University of Nevada, and the United Nations Asia and Far East Institute for the Prevention of Crime and Treatment of Offenders.

== Career in the Thai judiciary ==
Santi became a judge in 1968, and served as judge in the Provincial Courts of Rayong, Chiangmai, Phuket, Thonburi. He was appointed Deputy Chief Justice of the Second and Fourth Regions. He also worked in the Court of Appeal and the Central Tax Court. He became a judge of the Supreme Court in 1979.

After the 1992 coup d'état, the rebel military regime put Santi in charge of seizing the assets of 13 allegedly corrupt politicians of the former elected government.

On 31 July 2001 he was appointed by a unanimous vote of the Judicial Commission as the President (Chief Council) of the Supreme Court (Thai:ประธานศาลฎีกา). The appointment was made without debating his qualifications for the position. He retired a year later in 2002.

== Appointment as Privy Councillor ==
Santi was appointed a Privy Councillor of King Bhumibol Adulyadej in 2005. During the height of protests against Prime Minister Thaksin Shinawatra, General Suchinda Kraprayoon (head of the 1992 coup) suggested that Santi was the best possible mediator between Thaksin and the People's Alliance for Democracy. He died while holding that position in 2011.

== Orders and decorations ==
- Knight Grand Cordon (Special Class) of the Most Noble Order of the Crown of Thailand
- Knight Grand Cordon (Special Class) of the Most Exalted Order of the White Elephant
