= David Shannahoff-Khalsa =

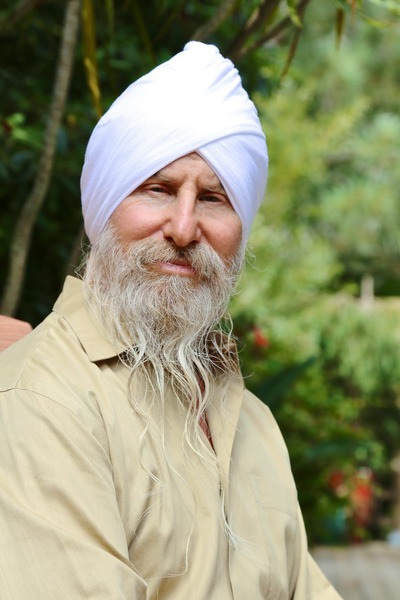
Photograph by Beatrice Ring

David S. Shannahoff-Khalsa is a researcher in mind-body dynamics. He has published widely in scientific journals and regularly presents full day courses at the American Psychiatric Association and other national and international conferences. Shannahoff-Khalsa has also published three books outlining his years of experience using Kundalini Yoga meditation as taught by Yogi Bhajan to understand and treat psychiatric disorders.

== Current Professional Positions ==
From 2011 to the present, David Shannahoff-Khalsa has been a member of the University of California, San Diego, Center for Integrative Medicine. From 2008 to the present, he has served as a consultant and yoga therapist at the Department of Psychiatry, University of California San Diego, Executive Mental Health Program, Center for Wellness and Personal Growth. From July 2009 to the present, Shannahoff-Khalsa has been director of The Research Group for Body-Mind Dynamics, BioCircuits Institute, University of California, San Diego, previous to which (1994-June 2009) he served as director of The Research Group for Body-Mind Dynamics, Institute for Nonlinear Science, University of California, San Diego. David Shannahoff-Khalsa has served as a senior editor of the Journal of Alternative and Complementary Medicine since 2009.

== Scientific Publications ==
David Shannahoff-Khalsa first published scientific papers in the The Journal of Organic Chemistry in 1973, Cancer Research in 1974, and Biochemistry in 1978. His scientific career started in 1970 at the Salk Institute for Biological Sciences in La Jolla with working in the field of nucleic acid chemistry and biochemistry on unique chemical substitutions in nucleosides, nucleotides, and polynucleotides as potential anti-viral and anti-cancer agents. He later changed fields and started work on concepts and techniques from yogic medicine in 1976 while at The Salk, demonstrating how the nasal cycle is tightly coupled to the ultradian rhythm of alternating cerebral hemispheric activity (Werntz DA, Bickford RG, Bloom FE, Shannahoff-Khalsa DS, Alternating Cerebral Hemispheric Activity and the Lateralization of Autonomic Nervous Function. Human Neurobiology, 1983, 2:39-43), and on the yogic technique called unilateral forced nostril breathing (UFNB) where they demonstrated via EEG the selective hemispheric stimulation by UFNB (Werntz DA, Bickford RG, Shannahoff-Khalsa DS, Selective Hemispheric Stimulation by Unilateral Forced Nostril Breathing, Human Neurobiology, (1987), 6:165-171). He later wrote reviews on these topics (Shannahoff-Khalsa DS, The Ultradian Rhythm of Alternating Cerebral Hemispheric Activity, International Journal of Neuroscience, 1993, 70:285-298, Shannahoff-Khalsa DS, Lateralized Rhythms of the Central and Autonomic Nervous Systems, International Journal of Psychophysiology, 1991, 11:225-251, and again in "Selective Unilateral Autonomic Activation: Implications for Psychiatry" (a review article), CNS Spectrums: The International Journal of Neuropsychiatric Medicine, 12(8), pp. 625–634, Aug 2007, and most recently in Shannahoff-Khalsa in Psychophysiological States: The Ultradian Dynamics of Mind-Body Interactions, In the series “International Review of Neurobiology,” Academic Press (Elsevier Scientific Publications), vol 80, pps. 1-249, 2008 His scientific publications include a total of 56 articles as of 2013.

Some of Shannahoff-Khalsa's most-cited work is a 1999 randomized control study on the effects of two meditation protocols on two groups of individuals with Obsessive-compulsive disorder (OCD). The one group practiced The Relaxation Response plus Mindfulness Meditation technique, while the other group employed a Kundalini Yoga protocol specific for treating OCD. After three months, it was found the Kundalini Yoga group showed greater improvement on all six scales, namely the Yale-Brown Obsessive-Compulsive Scale Y-BOCS, Symptoms Checklist-90-Revised Obsessive Compulsive (SC-90-R OC) and Global Severity Index (SC-90-R GSI), Profile of Moods Scale (POMS), Perceived Stress Scale (PSS), and Purpose in Life test (PiL). Within group statistics (Student's paired t-tests) showed that the Kundalini Yoga group significantly improved on all six scales, while The Relaxation Response/Mindfulness Meditation group had no significant improvements on any scale. The groups were merged for an additional 12months using the Kundalini Yoga protocol, and final group improved significantly on all the scales, demonstrating that kundalini yoga techniques are effective in the treatment of OCD.

In 1993 he started work using magnetoencephalography (MEG) to study the brain effects of the yogic breathing technique specific for treating OCD using instrumentation at The Scripps Research Institute. That work continues today with collaborators at the University of Catania, Sicily. He continues to study the ultradian rhythm of alternating cerebral hemispheric activity using whole-head 306 MEG + 66 channel EEG and its coupling to the sleep stages of REM and NREM sleep with collaborators at UCSD and Harvard MGH.

In a 2006 editorial for The Journal of Complementary and Alternative Medicine, Shannahoff-Khalsa makes a case for the vigorous and rigorous - "using all possible blinding for assessment" - study of new treatment modalities for psychiatric disorders.

== References (other selected representative) ==
4. Shannahoff-Khalsa D. (2012) Meditation: The Science and the Art. In: V.S. Ramachandran (ed.) The Encyclopedia of Human Behavior, vol. 2, pp. 576–584. Academic Press.

5. Bucolo M, Di Grazia F, Sapuppo F, Shannahoff-Khalsa D, Identification of MEG-Related Brain Dynamics Induced by a Yogic Breathing Technique, Conference Proceedings, IEEE Workshop on Health Care Management, Venice, Italy — February 18–20, 2010.

6. Di Grazia F, Sapuppo F, Shannahoff-Khalsa D, Bucolo M, Network Parameters for Studying Functional Connectivity in Brain MEG Data, International Journal of Bioelectromagnetism, Vol. 11, No. 4, pp. 161–169, 2009.

7. Shannahoff-Khalsa DS, Kundalini Yoga meditation techniques in the treatment of obsessive compulsive and OC spectrum disorders. In: Editor, Albert R. Roberts, Ph.D., Social Workers’ Desk Reference, second edition, New York, N.Y. Oxford University Press, Chapter 86 pp. 606–612, 2008.

8. Shannahoff-Khalsa DS. Patient perspectives: Kundalini yoga meditation techniques for psycho-oncology and as potential therapies for cancer. Integrative Cancer Therapies, 4(1):87-100, 2005.

9. Shannahoff-Khalsa D, Sramek BB, Kennel MB, Jamieson SW, Hemodynamic Observations on a Yogic Breathing Technique Claimed to Help Eliminate and Prevent Heart Attacks: A Pilot Study, The Journal of Alternative and Complementary Medicine, 10(5), 757-766, 2004.

10. Shannahoff-Khalsa D, An Introduction to Kundalini Yoga Meditation Techniques that are Specific for the Treatment of Psychiatric Disorders, The Journal of Alternative and Complementary Medicine, 10(1), 91-101, 2004.

11. Shannahoff-Khalsa DS, Kundalini Yoga meditation techniques in the treatment of obsessive compulsive and OC spectrum disorders, Brief Treatment and Crisis Intervention, 3:369-382 (2003).

12. Baglio S, Bucolo M, Fortuna L, Frasca M, La Rosa M, Shannahoff-Khalsa D, MEG signals spatial power distribution and gamma band activity in yoga breathing exercises. In: Conference Proceedings of the IEEE Engineering in Medicine and Biology Society2002, Houston, October 23–26, 2002. Proceedings 1, pp. 175–176.

13. Shannahoff-Khalsa DS, Gillin JC, Yates EJ, Schlosser A, Zawadzki EM, Ultradian rhythms of alternating cerebral hemispheric EEG dominance are coupled to rapid eye movement and stage 4 non-rapid eye movement sleep stage in humans, Sleep Medicine, Vol. 2, no. 4, pp. 333–346, 2001.

14. Shannahoff-Khalsa DS, and Yates FE. Ultradian sleep rhythms of lateral EEG, autonomic, and cardiovascular activity are coupled in humans. International Journal of Neuroscience, 101(1-4), 21-43, 2000.

15. Shannahoff-Khalsa DS, Yogic Techniques are Effective in the Treatment of Obsessive Compulsive Disorders, In: Eric Hollander & Dan Stein, eds., Obsessive-Compulsive Disorders: Diagnosis, Etiology, and Treatment, Marcel Dekker Inc., New York, pp. 283–329, 1997.

16. Shannahoff-Khalsa DS, Kennedy B, Yates FE, Ziegler MG, Low Frequency Ultradian Insulin Rhythms are Coupled to Cardiovascular, Autonomic, and Neuroendocrine Rhythms, American Journal of Physiology. Regulatory, Integrative and Comparative Physiology, Vol. 41, R962-R968, 1997.

17. Shannahoff-Khalsa DS, Beckett LR, Clinical Case Report: Efficacy of Yogic Techniques in the Treatment of Obsessive Compulsive Disorders, International Journal of Neuroscience, 85:1-17, 1996.

18. Kennedy B, Ziegler MG, Shannahoff-Khalsa DS, Alternating Lateralization of Plasma Catecholamines and Nasal Patency in Humans. Life Sciences, (1986), 38:1203-1214.

19. Klein R, Pilton D, Prosser S, Shannahoff-Khalsa DS, Hemispheric Performance Efficiency Varies with Nasal Airflow. Biological Psychology, (1986) 23:127-137.

== More Sources ==
His four books include:

- David Shannahoff-Khalsa, Sacred Therapies: The Kundalini Yoga Meditation Handbook for Mental Health, W.W. Norton and Company, New York, London, 2012.
- David Shannahoff-Khalsa, Kundalini Yoga Meditation for Complex Psychiatric Disorders: Techniques Specific for Treating the Psychoses, Personality, and Pervasive Developmental Disorders, W.W. Norton and Company, New York, 2010.
- David Shannahoff-Khalsa, DS, Psychophysiological States: The Ultradian Dynamics of Mind-Body Interactions, In the series “International Review of Neurobiology,” Academic Press (Elsevier Scientific Publications), vol 80, pps. 1-249, 2008
- David Shannahoff-Khalsa, Kundalini Yoga Meditation: Techniques Specific for Psychiatric Disorders, Couples Therapy and Personal Growth, W.W. Norton and Company, New York, London, 2006.
