= Khushdeva Singh =

Indian physician (1902–1985)

- Born: Patiala, Punjab, India
- Occupation: Physician
- Known for: Treatment of tuberculosis
- Awards: Padma Shri

Khushdeva Singh (1902–1985) was an Indian physician and social worker, known for his contributions towards the treatment of tuberculosis in India. Born in Patiala in the Indian state of Punjab, he served at the Hardinge Sanatorium, Dharampur in Himachal Pradesh for most of his service. He was the founder of the Lepers' Welfare Society, Patiala for the rehabilitation of leprosy patients of the region. Reports credit him as a humanist with a secular vision; he was known to have treated several Muslims during the Partition of India. He is the author of the books In Dedication and Love is Stronger Than Hate. In 1957, the Government of India honoured him with Padma Shri, the fourth-highest Indian civilian award, for his service to the nation. The Padma Shri Dr. Khushdeva Singh Hospital for Chest Diseases in Patiala is named after him.

== See also ==
- Tuberculosis in India
- Sushruta Samhita
