= Khem Singh Grewal =

Khem Singh Grewal (1894–1965) was an Indian pharmacologist. He worked at the King Edward Medical College in Lahore, and the Assam Medical College in Dibrugarh. He had varied research interests, including the study of medicinal plants. He participated in a large study of cancer incidence in India. He was key in founding pharmaceutic education at the University of Punjab in Lahore.

== University of Punjab ==
The initiation of pharmaceutical education in Punjab of undivided India was in 1944, when in King Edward Medical College at Lahore Dr. Khem Singh Grewal thought of starting the B.Pharm. degree course. Dr. Grewal who was Professor of Pharmacology in the medical college had been in association Col. R. N. Chopra at School of Tropical Medicine in Calcutta (now Kolkata) and with Dr. J. H. Burn at the London School of Pharmacy. These associations had been instrumental in arousing his interest in pharmacy and promoting pharmacy education. Following the partition of India the didactical facilities to run the B.Pharm. course shifted from Lahore to Amritsar till 1959. The consolidated pharmacy instructional facilities under the banner of Department of Pharmacy were shifted to the Punjab University campus at Chandigarh. Dr. K. N. Gaind was given the reigns of the department.
