= Feltrinelli Prize =

Italian award

The Feltrinelli Prize (from the Italian "Premio Feltrinelli", also known as "International Feltrinelli Prize" or "Antonio Feltrinelli Prize") is an award for achievement in the arts, music, literature, history, philosophy, medicine, and physical and mathematical sciences. Administered by the Antonio Feltrinelli Fund, the award comes with a monetary grant ranging between €50,000 and €250,000, a certificate, and a gold medal.

The prize is awarded, both nationally and internationally, once every five years in each field by Italy's Accademia Nazionale dei Lincei. A further prize is awarded periodically for an exceptional enterprise in moral and humanitarian value. Considered to be Italy's most distinguished scientific society, the organization was founded in 1603 and included Galileo Galilei among its first members.

== Award winners ==
- 1956 (Mathematics)
  - Prize reserved for Italian citizens (L. 1.500.000)
    - Beppo Levi
- 1957 (Literature)
  - Prize reserved for Italian citizens (L. 5.000.000)
    - Antonio Baldini
    - Virgilio Giotti
    - Vasco Pratolini
  - International Prize (L. 20.000.000)
    - Wystan Hugh Auden
    - Aldo Palazzeschi
- 1962 (Literature)
  - Prize reserved for Italian citizens
    - Bruno Cicognani
    - Giuseppe De Robertis
    - John Dos Passos
    - Carlo Emilio Gadda
    - Camillo Sbarbaro
  - International Prize
    - Eugenio Montale
- 1963 (Arts)
  - Prize reserved for Italian citizens (L. 5.000.000)
    - Painting: Mino Maccari
    - Music: Giorgio Federico Ghedini
    - Cinema: Luchino Visconti
  - International Prize
    - Sculpture: Henry Moore
- 1964 (Medicine)
  - International Prize (L. 25.000.000)
    - Experimental medicine: Wallace O. Fenn
    - Applied medical and surgical sciences: Albert Sabin
- 1966 (Physics, math and natural sciences)
  - Prize reserved for Italian citizens (L. 5.000.000)
    - Mathematics, Mechanics and Applications: Guido Stampacchia
    - Physics, Chemistry and Applications: Luigi Arialdo Radicati di Brozolo
    - Biology and Applications: Vittorio Capraro
  - International Prize (L. 20.000.000)
    - Geology: Harry Harry Hammond Hess
- 1972 (Literature)
  - Prize reserved for Italian citizens (L. 10.000.000)
    - Narration: Italo Calvino
    - History and criticism of literary language: Italo Siciliano
    - Theory and history of literary language: Gianfranco Folena
    - Poetry: Vittorio Sereni
  - International Prize (L. 20.000.000)
    - Theatre: Eduardo De Filippo
- 1981
  - International Prize (L. 100.000.000)
    - Sol Spiegelman
- 1984 (Medicine)
  - Prize reserved for Italian citizens (L. 25.000.000)
    - Ruggero Ceppellini
  - International Prize (L. 100.000.000)
    - Jérôme Lejeune
    - Robert Allan Weinberg
- 1986 (Physical, mathematical and natural sciences)
  - Prize reserved for Italian citizens (L. 20.000.000)
    - Mathematics: Lucilla Bassotti, Claudio Procesi
    - Astronomy, geodesy and geophysics: Fernando Sansò
    - Physics and chemistry: Giorgio Parisi, Alessandro Ballio, Emilio Gatti
    - Geology and paleontology: Maria Bianca Cita Sironi
    - Biological science: Lilia Alberghina, Luciano Bullini, Pietro Calissano
  - International Prize (L. 100.000.000)
    - Chemistry: Alan Battersby
- 1989 (Medicine)
  - International Prize (L. 100.000.000)
    - Giuseppe Attardi
- 1990
  - International Prize (L. 150.000.000)
    - Robert Roswell Palmer
- 1991
  - International Prize (L. 150.000.000)
    - Alfred Edward Ringwood
- 1992 (Literature)
  - Prize reserved for Italian citizens (L. 50.000.000)
    - Luciano Anceschi
  - International Prize (L. 200.000.000)
    - John Ashbery
- 1993 (Arts)
  - Prize reserved for Italian citizens (L. 50.000.000)
    - Emilio Vedova
- 1995
  - Prize reserved for Italian citizens (L. 100.000.000)
    - Sebastiano Timpanaro
- 1998 (Arts)
  - Prize reserved for Italian citizens (L. 125.000.000)
    - Painting: Carlo Maria Mariani
    - Cinema: Michelangelo Antonioni
    - Sculpture: Giuliano Vangi
    - Theatre: Luigi Squarzina
  - International Prize (L. 300.000.000)
    - Architecture: José Rafael Moneo Valles
- 1999 (Medicine)
  - International Prize (L. 300.000.000)
    - Arvid Carlsson
- 2002 (Literature)
  - Prize reserved for Italian citizens (€ 65.000)
    - Piero Boitani
    - Daniele Del Giudice
- 2003 (Arts)
  - Prize reserved for Italian citizens (€ 65.000)
    - Cinema: Ermanno Olmi
    - Photography: Mimmo Jodice
    - Orchestra direction: Riccardo Chailly
    - Engraving: Guido Strazza
  - International Prize (€ 250.000)
    - Music: Salvatore Sciarrino
- 2004 (Medicine)
  - International Prize (€ 250.000)
    - Gottfried Schatz
- 2006
  - Prize reserved for Italian citizens (€ 65.000)
    - Alberto Bressan
    - Giovanni Jona-Lasinio
  - International Prize (€ 250.000)
    - Saul Perlmutter
- 2007 (Literature)
  - International Prize (€ 250.000)
    - Brian Stock
- 2008 (Arts)
  - International Prize (€ 250.000)
    - Juha Leiviskä
- 2009 (Medicine)
  - Prize reserved for Italian citizens (€ 65.000)
    - Rino Rappuoli
  - International Prize (€ 250.000)
    - Ira Pastan
- 2011
  - Prize reserved for Italian citizens
    - Christopher Hacon
- 2014 (Medicine)
  - International Prize
    - Chris Dobson
- 2016
  - Prize reserved for Italian citizens
    - Alberto Mantovani
- 2023 (Arts)
  - Prize reserved for Italian citizens
    - Zerocalcare
- 2024 (Medicine)
  - International Prize
    - H. Franklin Bunn
- 2024 (Biology)
  - International Prize
    - Paola Arlotta
