= Indian Mathematical Society =

- Formation: 1907
- Headquarters: Pune, Maharashtra, India
- President: S. D. Adhikari
- Website: indianmathsoc.org

The Indian Mathematical Society (IMS) is the oldest organization in India devoted to the promotion of study and research in mathematics. The Society was founded in April 1907 by V. Ramaswamy Aiyer with its headquarters at Pune. The Society started its activities under the tentatively proposed name Analytic Club and the name was soon changed to Indian Mathematical Club. After the adoption of a new constitution in 1910, the society acquired its present name, the Indian Mathematical Society. The first president of the Society was B. Hanumantha Rao.

== Publications ==
The Society publishes two periodicals both of which are quarterly:

- The Journal of the Indian Mathematical Society (JIMS: ISSN 0019-5839)
- The Mathematics Student (Math Student: ISSN 0025-5742)

The 1911 volume of the Journal contains one of the earliest contributions of the Indian mathematician Srinivasa Ramanujan. It was in the form of a set of questions. A fifteen page paper entitled Some properties of Bernoulli Numbers contributed by Ramanujan also appeared in the same 1911 volume of the Journal.

The Mathematics Student usually contains the texts of addresses, talks and lectures delivered at the Annual Conferences of the Society, the abstracts of research papers presented at the Annual Conferences, and the Proceedings of the Society's Annual Conferences, as well as research papers, expository and popular articles, and book reviews.

== Annual Conferences ==
The first Annual Conference of the Society was held at Madras in 1916. The second conference was held at Bombay in 1919. From that time on, a conference was held every two years until 1951 when it was decided to hold the conferences annually. The twenty-fifth Conference was held at Allahabad in 1959 which was inaugurated by Jawaharlal Nehru, the first Prime Minister of India.

=== Memorial Award Lectures ===
During every Annual Conference, the following Memorial Award Lectures are arranged as a part of the Academic Programme:

1. P.L. Bhatnagar Memorial Award Lecture (instituted in 1987).
2. Srinivasa Ramanujan Memorial Award Lecture (instituted in 1990).
3. V. Ramaswamy Aiyer Memorial Award Lecture (instituted in 1990).
4. Hansraj Gupta Memorial Award Lecture (instituted in 1990).
5. Ganesh Prasad Memorial Award Lecture (instituted in 1993 and delivered every alternate year).

=== IMS Prizes ===
==== Professor A. K. Agarwal Award ====
Award of INR 10,000 for the best publication in any journal in the world. The first Professor A. K. Agarwal Award for best publication was awarded to Dr. Neena Gupta.

==== P.L. Bhatnagar Memorial Prize ====
This Prize is awarded annually to the top scorer of the Indian team at the International Mathematical Olympiad. It consists of a cash of Rs. 1000/- and a Certificate. The award is presented during the Inaugural Session of the Annual Conference of the Indian Mathematical Society.

==== Prizes for research paper presentations ====
The Society holds, during its Annual Conferences, a Special Session of Paper Presentation Competition and Prizes are awarded to the best research paper in various areas. This Special Session is held as a part of the Academic Programme.

- Six IMS Prizes for papers in the areas of algebra, geometry, topology, functional analysis, differential geometry, discrete mathematics, number theory, operations research, fluid dynamics, biomathematics and computer science.
- AMU Prize for papers in the areas of algebra, functional analysis and differential geometry.
- V.M. Shah Prize for papers in analysis.

== Council of the Society ==
The Indian Mathematical Society is governed by a Council of nine officers, and nice additional council members.

The Council of the Indian Mathematical Society: 1 April 2024–31 March 2025

Sl. No.	Office	Name	Affiliation
1	President	Madhu Raka	Panjab University, Chandigarh
2	Immediate Past President	R. Balasubramanian	Former director of the Institute of Mathematical Sciences, Chennai
3	General Secretary	M. M. Shikare	Formerly at Savitribai Phule Pune University
4	Administrative Secretary	B. N. Waphare	Savitribai Phule Pune University
5	Academic Secretary	G. P. Raja Sekhar	Indian Institute of Technology Kharagpur
6	Treasurer	M. M. Pawar	Formerly at North Maharashtra University, Jalgaon
7	Editor-in-Chief (The Journal of IMS)	Peeyush Chandra	Formerly at Indian Institute of Technology Kanpur
8	Editor-in Chief (The Mathematics Student)	G. P. Youvaraj	Formerly at Ramanujan Institute for Advanced Study in Mathematics, Chennai
9	Librarian	M. Pitchaimani	Ramanujan Institute for Advanced Study in Mathematics, Chennai

== Presidents of IMS ==
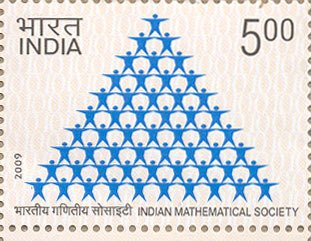
Stamp of India - 2009 Indian Mathematical Society

=== 1907 – 1949 ===
1907-12	B. Hanumantha Rao
1912-15	R. N. Apte
1915-15	E. W. Middlemast
1915-17	R. Ramachandra Rao
1917-21	A. C. L. Wilkinson
1921-26	Hoon Balakram
1926-30	V. Ramaswamy Aiyer
1930-32	M. T. Naraniengar
1932-34	P. V. Seshu Aiyar
1934-36	H. G. Gharpure
1936-40	R. P. Paranjpye
1940-42	Ramaswamy S. Vaidyanathaswamy
1942-47	Friedrich Wilhelm Levi
1947-49	M. R. Siddiqui

=== 1949 – 1975 ===
1949-51	A. Narasinga Rao
1951-53	T. Vijayraghavan
1953-57	Ram Behar
1957-59	V. Ganapathy Iyer
1959-60	B. S. Madhav Rao
1960-61	B. N. Prasad
1961-62	B. S. Madhav Rao
1962-63	C. N. Srinivasienger
1963-64	Hansraj Gupta
1964-66	Prabhu Lal Bhatnagar
1966-68	R. S. Verma
1968-69	Prabhu Lal Bhatnagar
1969-70	Ram Prakash Bambah
1970-71	M. Venkatraman
1971-73	J. N. Kapoor
1973-74	K. G. Ramanathan
1974-75	V. Krishnamurthy

=== 1975 – 2000 ===
1975-77	P. C. Vaidya
1977-79	U. N. Singh
1979-81	K. Venkatchelienger
1981-82	Vishnu Vasudev Narlikar
1982-84	R. S. Mishra
1984-85	R. P. Agarwal
1985-86	S. D. Chopra
1986-87	H. C. Khare
1987-88	V. Singh
1988-89	M. K. Singal
1989-90	M. P. Singh
1990-91	V. M. Shah
1991-92	D. K. Sinha
1992-93	V. Kannan
1993-94	U. P. Singh
1994-95	H. P. Dixit
1995-96	N. K. Thakare
1996-97	S. Bhargava
1997-98	A. R. Singal
1998-99	B. K. Lahiri
1999-00	Anadi Sankar Gupta

=== 2000 – 2015 ===
2000-01	Satya Deo
2001-02	P. V. Arunachalam
2002-03	M. A. Pathan
2003-04	Thiruvenkatachari Parthasarathy
2004-05	T. Thrivikraman
2005-06	Sarvajit Singh
2006-07	Inder Bir Singh Passi
2007-08	Ravindra Bapat
2008-09	A. K. Agarwal
2009-10	Peeyush Chandra
2010-11	R. Sridharan
2011-12	P. K. Banerji
2012-13	Huzoor H. Khan
2013-14	Geetha S. Rao
2014-15	S. G. Dani

=== 2015 – present ===
2015-16	A. M. Mathai
2016-17	D. V. Pai
2017-18	Manjul Gupta
2018-19	Sudhir Ghorpade
2019-20	S. Arumugam
2020-21	B. Sury
2021-22	Dipendra Prasad
2022-23	Sukumar Das Adhikari
2023-24	R. Balasubramanian
2025-26	S. S. Khare

== List of other mathematical societies in India ==
- Jadavpur University Mathematical Society (JMS)
- Allahabad Mathematical Society
- Bharata Ganita Parishd (formerly, Banars Mathematical Society)
- Bihar Mathematical Society
- Calcutta Mathematical Society
- Gujarat Mathematical Society
- Kerala Mathematical Association
- Marathwada Mathematical Society (founded in 1999)[www.marathwadamathsociety.org/]
- Orissa Mathematical Society
- Punjab Mathematical Society
- Rajasthan Ganita Parishd
- Ramanujan Mathematical Society
- Tripura Mathematical Society
- Vijnana Parishad of India

== See also ==
- List of mathematical societies
