= T. Thrivikraman =

Indian mathematician (born 1943)

- Born: May 6, 1943; Arangottukara, Thrissur, Kerala State, India
- Died: March 25, 2024 (aged 80); Neeleswaram, Kasaragod, Kerala State, India
- Education: Kerala University, Madurai University
- Known for: Contributions to topology, fuzzy mathematics, history of mathematics
- Scientific career
- Fields: Mathematics
- Workplaces: Mar Athanasius College, Kothamangalam, Cochin University of Science and Technology
- Doctoral advisor: T. Soundararajan

T. Thrivikraman (Thekkedath Thrivikraman) (born 6 May 1943, Died on 25 March 2024 ) was an Indian mathematician who has made important contributions to topology, fuzzy mathematics, history of mathematics and to several other areas of mathematics. He actively promoted the culture of mathematical research in Kerala, himself guiding as many as 29 students in their doctoral research. He was also actively involved in the activities of the science popularization movement known as Kerala Sasthra Sahithya Parishad.

== Early life and work on ==
Thrivikraman was born in Arangottukara, a small village in Thrissur district in Kerala State. After completing his Bachelor's studies in mathematics in Thrissur, he took his master's degree in mathematics from Kerala University in 1964. He started his mathematical career as a lecturer in mathematics in Mar Athanasius College, Kothamangalam, India, immediately after securing his master's degree. He availed leave from Mar Athanasius College and proceeded to Madurai University to pursue research in mathematics. Initially, he secured the Master of Philosophy degree in mathematics in 1969. He was awarded the Doctor of Philosophy degree in 1976 for his dissertation on "Studies in Compactifications and other Extensions" written under the supervision of Prof. T. Soundararajan. In 1977 he moved over to the Department of Mathematics in Cochin University of Science and Technology where he held several positions until his retirement in 2003. After retirement from Cochin University of Science and Technology, he joined St. Joseph's College, Irinjalakuda to help develop a research centre in mathematics. Since 2009, he has been remaining active in mathematics by serving as a Visiting Professor in Kannur University.

More than half of his doctoral students worked on various aspects of fuzzy mathematics. He helped push the boundaries of the theory to newer frontiers. Under his guidance and supervision, studies were conducted on various fuzzy mathematical structures like, fuzzy topology, fuzzy topological semigroups, fuzzy convexity, fuzzy inner-product spaces, fuzzy measures, fuzzy topological games, fuzzy commutative algebra, fuzzy matroids, etc.

During the 79th Annual Conference of the Indian Mathematical Society held at Rajagiri School of Engineering & Technology, Kochi, during 28–31 December 2013, Thrivikraman, along with two other mathematicians from Kerala Prof. K. S. S. Nambooripad and Prof. R. Sivaramakrishnan, were honoured in a special event called Guruvandanam for their lifetime contributions to mathematics.

== Activities under the banner of Kerala Mathematical Association ==
Kerala Mathematical Association is an organisation established in 1962 to serve the mathematical community comprising students, teachers and researchers inside Kerala and outside. Thrivikraman has been serving the Association as its Academic Secretary. In this capacity he has helped organize several national/international workshops and seminars in various colleges in different parts of Kerala.

== Science popularization efforts ==
Thrivikraman is a life-member of Kerala Sasthra Sahithya Parishad. He organised a unit of the Parishad at Kothamangalam and also a Graama Saasthra Samithi there. He published many popular science articles in Malayalam dealing with mathematics in various journals. He contributed about 20 articles to the Malayalam encyclopaedia Viswa Vijnana Kosham published by National Book Stall, 8 articles to a Children's encyclopaedia published by STEPS. He authored two books on popular science and mathematics and also a book of poems.

== Recognitions ==
- Fellow of the National Academy of Sciences, India
- President of Indian Mathematical Society during 2004-05
- Life member/Member of several Mathematical and scientific associations at the State, National and International levels

== Books ==
- "Anama" (poems in Malayalam) published (self) in 1974.
- "Ethravare ennam" (book in Malayalam), published by Kerala Satra Sahitya Parishad in 1998 (title can be loosely translated as "How far can one count?").
- "Aryabhatan - Ganitha Jyothisasthrangalute Kulapathi", (in Malayalam) published by Kerala Sastra Sahitya Parishad in 1999.
