= Eugene P. Gross =

- Born: 27 June 1926; New York City
- Died: 19 January 1991 (aged 64); Boston
- Education: Princeton
- Known for: Gross–Pitaevskii equation, Bhatnagar–Gross–Krook operator
- Scientific career
- Workplaces: Harvard, Massachusetts Institute of Technology, Syracuse University, Brandeis University, Sapienza University of Rome
- Thesis: Theory of Plasma Oscillations (1949)
- Doctoral advisor: David Bohm
- Doctoral students: Daniel Amit

Eugene Paul Gross (27 June 1926 – 19 January 1991) was a theoretical physicist and Edward and Gertrude Swartz professor at Brandeis University, known for his contribution to the Bhatnagar-Gross-Krook (BGK) collision model used in the Boltzmann equation and in lattice Boltzmann methods and to the Gross–Pitaevskii equation which describes the ground state of a quantum system of identical bosons.

== Education and work ==
Gross obtained his Ph.D. at Princeton in 1948, where he was one of the first graduate students of David Bohm.

Gross was Carnegie Fellow at Harvard from 1948 to 1949 and research associate at the Massachusetts Institute of Technology from 1950 to 1951. Subsequently, until 1954, he was a staff member at the Laboratory for Insulation Research and from 1954 to 1956 assistant professor at Syracuse University.

In 1956 Gross was appointed associate professor at Brandeis University, where he became full professor in 1961.

From 1963 to 1964 he was a Fulbright Scholar at the University of Rome in Italy, and from 1969 to 1970 visiting professor at the Massachusetts Institute of Technology. He held the Edward and Gertrude Swartz chair of Theoretical Physics since 1976 and chaired Brandeis University's department of physics from 1977 to 1979.

With Prabhu L. Bhatnagar and Max Krook, Gross introduced the Bhatnagar–Gross–Krook operator in a paper in Physical Review in 1954. In 1961 Gross and separately Lev Pitaevskii presented what is now known as the Gross–Pitaevskii equation.

His fields of research pertained to quantum liquids, plasmas, solids, liquid helium and the kinetic theory of gases.

Gross published over 80 scientific articles, including work with Bohm published 1949/1950 and work with P. L. Bhatnagar and M. Krook of 1954.
