= Ceppellini =

Ceppellini is an Italian surname. Notable people with the surname include:

- Pablo Ceppelini (born 1991), Uruguayan football player
- Ruggero Ceppellini (1917–1988), Italian geneticist
