= Rudolf Peierls =

German-born British physicist (1907–1995)

Sir Rudolf Peierls CBE FRS
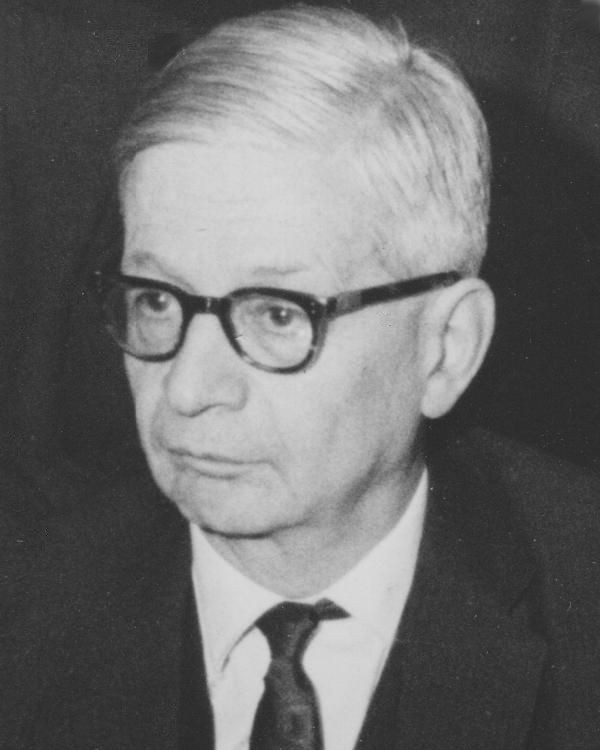
- Peierls in 1966
- Born: Rudolf Ernst Peierls; 5 June 1907; Berlin, Kingdom of Prussia in the German Empire
- Died: 19 September 1995 (aged 88); Oxford, Oxfordshire, England
- Citizenship: German (1907–1940); British (1940–1995)
- Education: Friedrich Wilhelm University of Berlin; Ludwig-Maximilians-Universität München; Leipzig University; University of Manchester; St John's College, Cambridge
- Known for: Peierls argument Peierls bracket Peierls droplets Peierls substitution Peierls stress Peierls transition Landau–Peierls instability Peierls–Bogoliubov inequality Peierls–Nabarro potential Bohr–Peierls–Placzek relation Frisch–Peierls memorandum Charge density wave theory Umklapp process Tube Alloys project
- Awards: Commander of the Order of the British Empire (1946); Medal of Freedom (1946); Royal Medal (1959); Lorentz Medal (1962); Max Planck Medal (1963); Knight Bachelor (1968); Enrico Fermi Award (1980); Matteucci Medal (1982); Copley Medal (1986)
- Scientific career
- Fields: Physicist
- Workplaces: University of Manchester; University of Cambridge; University of Birmingham; New College, Oxford; University of Washington; Manhattan Project
- Thesis: Zur kinetischen Theorie der Wärmeleitung in Kristallen (1929)
- Doctoral advisor: Werner Heisenberg
- Other academic advisors: Wolfgang Pauli
- Doctoral students: Fred Hoyle; E. E. Salpeter; Gerald E. Brown; Stuart T. Butler; Walter Marshall; James S. Langer; John Stewart Bell; Stanley Mandelstam

Sir Rudolf Ernst Peierls, CBE FRS (/ˈpaɪ.ərlz/; German: [ˈpaɪɐls]; 5 June 1907 – 19 September 1995) was a German-born British physicist who played a major role in Tube Alloys, Britain's nuclear weapon programme, as well as the subsequent Manhattan Project, the combined Allied nuclear bomb programme. His 1996 obituary in Physics Today described him as "a major player in the drama of the eruption of nuclear physics into world affairs".

Peierls studied physics at the Friedrich Wilhelm University of Berlin, at the Ludwig-Maximilians-Universität München under Arnold Sommerfeld, Leipzig University under Werner Heisenberg, and ETH Zurich under Wolfgang Pauli. After receiving his DPhil from Leipzig University in 1929, he became an assistant to Pauli at ETH Zurich. In 1932, he was awarded a Rockefeller Fellowship, which he used to study in Rome under Enrico Fermi, and then at the Cavendish Laboratory at the University of Cambridge under Ralph H. Fowler. Because of his Jewish background, he elected to not return home after Adolf Hitler's rise to power in 1933, but to remain in Britain, where he worked with Hans Bethe at the Victoria University of Manchester, then at the Mond Laboratory at Cambridge. In 1937, Mark Oliphant, the newly appointed Australian professor of physics at the University of Birmingham recruited him for a new chair there in applied mathematics.

In March 1940, Peierls co-authored the Frisch–Peierls memorandum with Otto Robert Frisch. This short paper was the first to set out that one could construct an atomic bomb from a small amount of fissile uranium-235. Until then it had been assumed that such a bomb would require many tons of uranium, and consequently was impractical to build and use. The paper was pivotal in igniting the interest of first the British and later the American authorities in nuclear weapons. He was also responsible for the recruitment of his compatriot Klaus Fuchs to work on Tube Alloys, as the British nuclear weapons project was called, which resulted in Peierls falling under suspicion when Fuchs was exposed as a spy for the Soviet Union in 1950.

After the war, Peierls returned to the University of Birmingham, where he worked until 1963, and then was the Wykeham Professor of Physics and a Fellow of New College at the University of Oxford until he retired in 1974. At Birmingham he worked on nuclear forces, scattering, quantum field theories, collective motion in nuclei, transport theory and statistical mechanics, and was a consultant to the Atomic Energy Research Establishment at Harwell. He received many awards, including a knighthood in 1968, and wrote several books including Quantum Theory of Solids, The Laws of Nature (1955), Surprises in Theoretical Physics (1979), More Surprises in Theoretical Physics (1991) and an autobiography, Bird of Passage (1985). Concerned with the nuclear weapons he had helped to unleash, he worked on the Bulletin of the Atomic Scientists, was President of the Atomic Scientists' Association in the UK, and was involved in the Pugwash movement.

== Early life ==
Rudolf Ernst Peierls was born in the Berlin suburb of Oberschöneweide, the youngest of three children of Heinrich Peierls an electrical engineer, from a family of Jewish merchants. His father was the managing director of a cable factory of AEG, and his mother was his father's first wife, Elisabeth (née Weigert). Rudolf had an older brother, Alfred, and an older sister, Annie. His mother died from Hodgkin's lymphoma in 1921, and his father married Else Hermann, the sister-in-law of the playwright Ludwig Fulda. The family was Jewish, but assimilated, and Peierls and his siblings were baptised as Lutherans. When he came of age, Peierls left the church.

Peierls commenced school a year late because he needed glasses, and his parents did not trust him not to lose them or break them. After two years at the local preparatory school, he entered his local gymnasium, the Humboldt Gymnasium, where he spent the next nine years, passing his abitur examinations in 1925. He wanted to study engineering, but his parents, who doubted his practical abilities, suggested physics instead. He entered the Friedrich Wilhelm University of Berlin, where he listened to lectures by Max Planck, Walther Bothe and Walther Nernst. Fellow students included Kurt Hirsch and Käte Sperling. The physics laboratory classes were overcrowded, so the first year students were encouraged to take theoretical physics courses instead. Peierls found that he liked the subject.

In 1926, Peierls decided to transfer to the Ludwig-Maximilians-Universität München to study under Arnold Sommerfeld, who was considered to be the greatest teacher of theoretical physics. Fellow students there included Hans Bethe, Hermann Brück and William V. Houston. At the time, the Bohr-Sommerfeld theory was being overturned by the new quantum mechanics of Werner Heisenberg and Paul Dirac. In 1928, Sommerfeld set off on a world tour. On his advice, Peierls moved to Leipzig University, where Heisenberg had been appointed to a chair in 1927.

Heisenberg set Peierls a research project on ferromagnetism. It was known that this was caused by the spin of the electrons in the metal aligning; but the reason for this was unknown. Heisenberg suspected that it was caused by a quantum mechanical effect, caused by the Pauli exclusion principle. Peierls was unable to develop the theory, but work on Hall effect was more productive. The anomalous Hall effect could not be explained with the classical theory of metals, and Heisenberg sensed an opportunity to demonstrate that quantum mechanics could explain it. Peierls was able to do so, resulting in his first published paper.

Heisenberg left in 1929 to lecture in America, China, Japan and India, and on his recommendation Peierls moved on to ETH Zurich, where he studied under Wolfgang Pauli. Pauli set him a problem of investigating the vibration of atoms in a crystal lattice. Peierls explored—and named—the phenomenon of umklapp scattering. He submitted this work as his DPhil thesis, Zur kinetischen Theorie der Wärmeleitung in Kristallen (On the Kinetic Theory of Heat Conduction in Crystals), which was accepted by Leipzig University in 1929. His theory made specific predictions of the behaviour of metals at very low temperatures, but another twenty years would pass before the techniques were developed to confirm them experimentally.

== Early career ==
Peierls accepted an offer from Pauli to become his assistant in place of Felix Bloch. Lev Landau was there at this time on a scholarship from the government of the Soviet Union, and Peierls and Landau became friends. They collaborated on deriving a series of wave equations similar to the Schrödinger equation for photons. Unfortunately, their equations, while complicated, were nonsensical. In 1930, Peierls travelled to the Netherlands to meet Hans Kramers, and to Copenhagen to meet Niels Bohr.

In August 1930 Pauli and Peierls attended a physics congress in Odessa and met a young physics graduate, Eugenia (Genia) Nikolaievna Kannegiesser, who, like Landau, came from Leningrad. Since he did not speak Russian and she did not speak German, they conversed in English. During a subsequent visit by Peierls to lecture in Leningrad they were married on 15 March 1931. However, she had to wait for a passport and exit visa. They finally left for Zürich that summer. They had four children: Gaby Ellen (b.1933), Ronald Frank (b.1935), Catherine (Kitty; b.1948), and Joanna (b.1949).

Peierls assisted Egon Orowan in understanding the force required to move a dislocation which would be expanded on by Frank Nabarro and called the Peierls–Nabarro force. In 1929, he studied solid-state physics in Zurich under the tutelage of Heisenberg and Pauli. His early work on quantum physics led to the theory of positive carriers to explain the thermal and electrical conductivity behaviours of semiconductors. He was a pioneer of the concept of "holes" in semiconductors. He established "zones" before Léon Brillouin, despite Brillouin's name being currently attached to the idea, and applied it to phonons. Doing this, he discovered the Boltzmann equations for phonons and the umklapp process. He submitted a paper on the subject for his habilitation, acquiring the right to teach at German universities. Physics Today noted that "His many papers on electrons in metals have now passed so deeply into the literature that it is hard to identify his contribution to conductivity in magnetic fields and to the concept of a hole in the theory of electrons in solids".

== Academic in exile ==
In 1932, Peierls was awarded a Rockefeller Fellowship to study abroad, which he used to study in Rome under Enrico Fermi, and then at the Cavendish Laboratory at the University of Cambridge in England under Ralph H. Fowler. In Rome, Peierls completed two papers on electronic band structure, in which he introduced the Peierls substitution, and derived a general expression for diamagnetism in metals at low temperatures. This provided an explanation of the hitherto mysterious properties of bismuth, in which diamagnetic properties were more pronounced than in other metals.

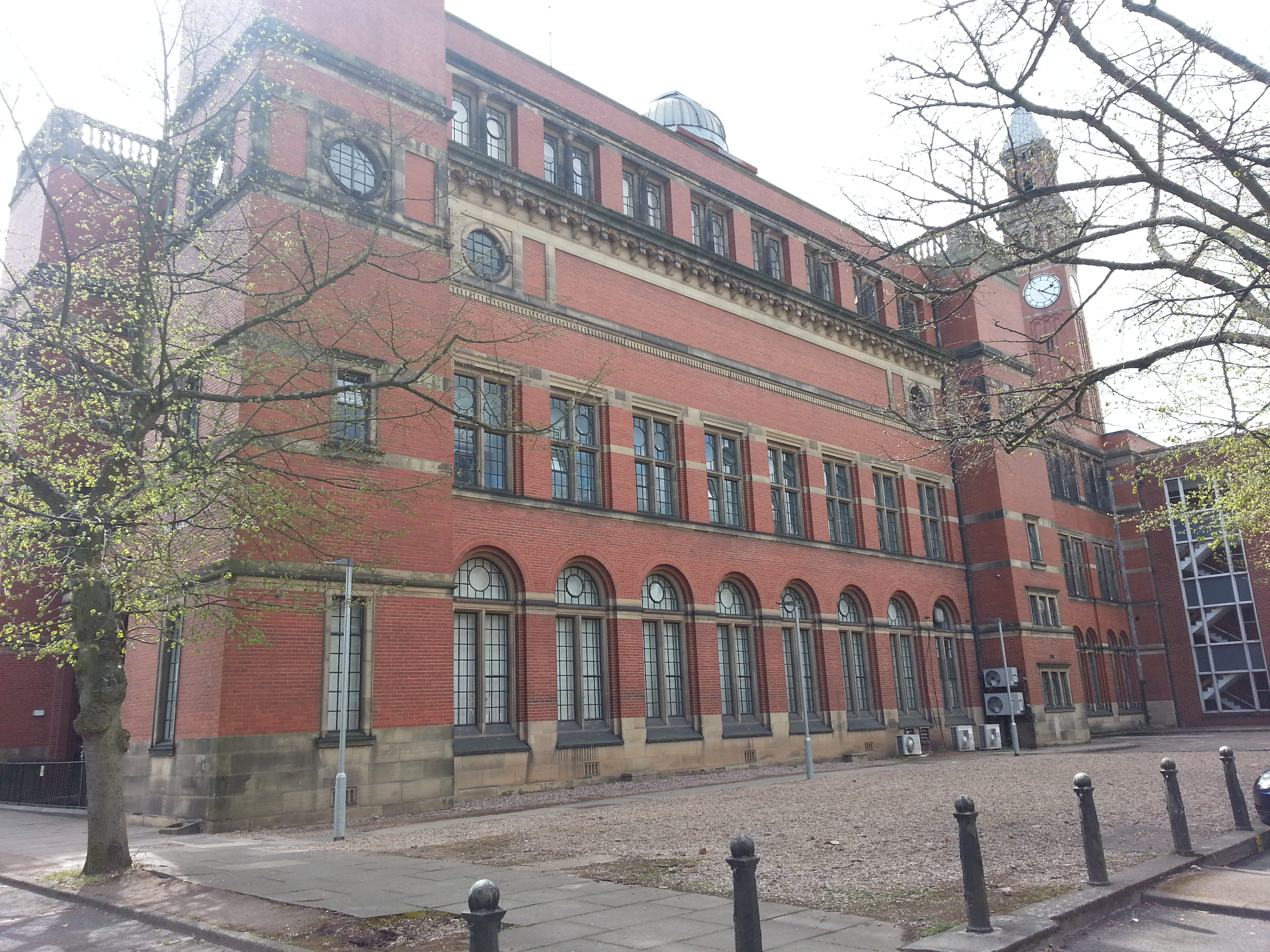
The Poynting Physics building at the University of Birmingham. Its mode of construction helped give rise to the phrase "redbrick university".

Due to Adolf Hitler's rise to power in Germany, he elected to not return home in 1933, but to remain in Britain. He declined an offer from Otto Stern of a position at the University of Hamburg. Granted leave to remain in Britain, he worked at the Victoria University of Manchester with funding from the Academic Assistance Council, which had been set up to help academic refugees from Germany and other fascist countries. Most of his immediate family also left Germany; his brother and his family settling in Britain, and his sister and her family, along with his father and stepmother, moved to the United States, where his uncle Siegfried lived.

Peierls collaborated with Bethe on photodisintegration and the statistical mechanics of alloys when challenged by James Chadwick. Their results still serve as the basis for mean-field theories of structural phase changes in complete alloys. Although most of his work continued to be about the electron theory of metals, he also looked at Dirac's hole theory, and co-wrote a paper with Bethe on the neutrino. The University of Manchester awarded him a D.Sc. degree. Moving back to Cambridge, he worked with David Shoenberg at the Mond Laboratory on superconductivity and liquid helium. To allow him to lecture, in accordance with its rules, St John's College, Cambridge, awarded him an ex officio M.A. degree.

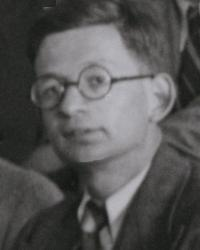
Peierls in 1937

In 1936, Mark Oliphant was appointed the professor of physics at the University of Birmingham, and he approached Peierls about a new chair in applied mathematics that he was creating there. (Applied mathematics being what would today be called theoretical physics.) Peierls got the job despite competition from Harrie Massey and Harry Jones. The appointment at last gave Peierls a secure, permanent position. His students included Fred Hoyle and P. L. Kapur, a student from India. With Kapur he derived the dispersion formula for nuclear reactions originally given in perturbation theory by Gregory Breit and Eugene Wigner, but now included generalising conditions. This is now known as the Kapur–Peierls derivation. It is still used, but in 1947 Wigner and Leonard Eisenbud developed a more widely used alternative method. In 1938, Peierls paid visits to Copenhagen, where he collaborated with Bohr and George Placzek on a paper on what is now known as the Bohr–Peierls–Placzek relation. The Second World War broke out before it could be published; but drafts were circulated for comment, and it became one of the most cited unpublished papers of all time.

== Second World War ==
=== Frisch–Peierls memorandum ===
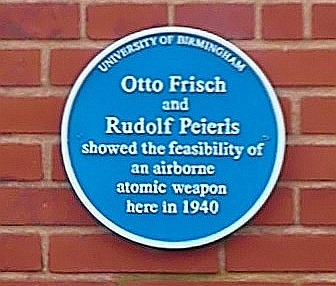
Plaque commemorating the Frisch-Peierls memorandum at the University of Birmingham's Poynting Physics Building

After the outbreak of the Second World War in September 1939, Peierls started working on nuclear weapons research with Otto Robert Frisch, a fellow refugee from Germany. Ironically, they were excluded from the work on radar at the University of Birmingham because it was considered too secret for scientists who were enemy aliens. Peierls was naturalised as a British subject on 27 March 1940. He was eager to participate in the fight against fascism and militarism, but the only organisation that would accept him was the Auxiliary Fire Service. He accepted an offer from the University of Toronto to send his two children to live with a family in Canada.

In February and March 1940, Peierls and Frisch co-authored the Frisch–Peierls memorandum, which Peierls typed. This short paper was the first to establish that an atomic bomb could be created from a small amount of fissile uranium-235. Based on the information at hand, they calculated that less than 1 kg would be required. The true figure for the critical mass is about four times as large; but until then it had been assumed that such a bomb would require many tons of uranium, and consequently was impractical to build and use. They went on to estimate the size of the explosion, and its physical, military and political effects.

The Frisch–Peierls memorandum was pivotal in igniting the interest of first the British and later the American authorities in atomic weapons. In 1941 its findings made their way to the United States through the report of the MAUD Committee, an important trigger in the establishment of the Manhattan Project and the subsequent development of the atomic bomb. With the Frisch-Peierls memorandum and the MAUD Committee report, the British and American scientists were able to begin thinking about how to create a bomb, not whether it was possible.

As enemy aliens, Frisch and Peierls were initially excluded from the MAUD Committee, but the absurdity of this was soon recognised, and they were made members of its Technical Subcommittee. This did not mean that they were cleared for radar work. When Oliphant made the services of his secretary available for typing up the Peierl's and Frisch's papers for the MAUD Committee in September 1940, they were not allowed to enter the Nuffield Building where she worked, so Peierls submitted them for typing by dictaphone on wax cylinders. Frisch and Peierls thought at first that uranium enrichment was best achieved through thermal diffusion, but as the difficulties with this approach became more apparent they switched to gaseous diffusion, bringing in a fellow refugee from Germany, Franz Simon, as an expert on the subject. Peierls also recruited yet another refugee from Germany, Klaus Fuchs, as his assistant in May 1941.

=== Manhattan Project ===
As a result of the MAUD Committee's findings, a new directorate known as Tube Alloys was created to coordinate the nuclear weapons development effort. Sir John Anderson, the Lord President of the Council, became the minister responsible, and Wallace Akers from Imperial Chemical Industries (ICI) was appointed the director of Tube Alloys. Peierls, Chadwick and Simon were appointed to its Technical Committee, which was chaired by Akers. Its first meeting, in November 1941, was attended by two American visitors, Harold Urey and George B. Pegram. Later that year, Peierls flew to the United States, where he visited Urey and Fermi in New York, Arthur H. Compton in Chicago, Robert Oppenheimer in Berkeley, and Jesse Beams in Charlottesville, Virginia. When George Kistiakowsky argued that a nuclear weapon would do little damage as most of the energy would be expended heating the air, Peierls, Fuchs, Geoffrey Taylor and J. G. Kynch worked out the hydrodynamics to refute this.

The signing of the Quebec Agreement on 19 August 1943 merged Tube Alloys with the Manhattan Project. Akers had already cabled London with instructions that Chadwick, Peierls, Oliphant and Simon should leave immediately for North America to join the British Mission to the Manhattan Project, and they arrived the day the agreement was signed. Simon and Peierls were attached to the Kellex Corporation, which was engaged in the K-25 Project, designing and building the American gaseous diffusion plant. While Kellex was located in the Woolworth Building, Peierls, Simon and Nicholas Kurti had their offices in the British supply mission on Wall Street. They were joined there by Tony Skyrme and Frank Kearton, who arrived in March 1944. Kurti returned to England in April 1944 and Kearton in September. Peierls moved on to the Los Alamos Laboratory in February 1944; Skyrme followed in July, and Fuchs in August.

At Los Alamos, the British Mission was fully integrated into the laboratory, and British scientists worked in most of its divisions, being excluded only from plutonium chemistry and metallurgy. When Oppenheimer appointed Bethe as the head of the laboratory's prestigious Theoretical (T) Division, he offended Edward Teller, who was given his own group, tasked with investigating Teller's "Super" bomb. Oppenheimer then wrote to the director of the Manhattan Project, Brigadier General Leslie R. Groves Jr., requesting that Peierls be sent to take Teller's place in T Division. Peierls arrived from New York on 8 February 1944, and subsequently succeeded Chadwick as head of the British Mission at Los Alamos.

Peierls also became leader of T-1 (Implosion) Group, and so was responsible for the design of the explosive lenses used in the implosion-type nuclear weapon to focus an explosion onto a spherical shape. He sent regular reports to Chadwick, the head of the British Mission to the Manhattan Project, in Washington, DC. When Groves found out, he asked Peierls to send him reports too. Peierls was one of those present at the Trinity nuclear test on 16 July 1945. He returned to England in January 1946. For his services to the nuclear weapons project, he was appointed a Commander of the Order of the British Empire in the 1946 New Year Honours, and was awarded the US Medal of Freedom with Silver Palm in 1946.

=== Espionage allegations ===
Peierls was responsible for the recruitment of Fuchs to the British project, an action which was to result in Peierls falling under suspicion when Fuchs was exposed as a Soviet spy in 1950. In 1999, The Spectator garnered outrage from Peierls's family when it published an article by journalist Nicholas Farrell that alleged that Peierls was a spy for the Soviet Union. The article was based on information supplied by intelligence historian Nigel West, who identified Peierls as the spy codenamed "Fogel" and later "Pers" in the Venona intercepts, and his wife Genia as the spy codenamed "Tina". However, the association of Tina with Genia did not fit with what was known about Tina, and she was conclusively revealed to be Melita Norwood in 1999. Nor did Peierls fit Pers, as the latter worked at the Clinton Engineer Works, whereas Peierls did not. In 2009, Vogel/Pers was outed as being actually Russell A. McNutt, a civil engineer employed by the company Kellex to work on facilities at Oak Ridge, who was recruited as a spy by Julius Rosenberg.

There were good reasons for the postwar intelligence agencies to suspect Peierls. He not only had recruited Fuchs, and served as his "sponsor" on recruitment and security matters, but had pressed the authorities for Fuchs to be given a full security clearance without which he could not have assisted Peierls in his work. Fuchs lived with the Peierls family for a time. Peierls had a Russian wife, as did his brother, and he maintained close contact with colleagues in the Soviet Union before and after the Second World War.

While not a communist like Fuchs, Peierls was known to have left-wing political views, and had colleagues with similar views. He was denied a visa to visit the United States to attend a Nuclear Physics Conference in Chicago in 1951. A similar request the following year was granted, but in 1957 the Americans expressed concerns about him, indicating that they were unwilling to share information with the Atomic Energy Research Establishment at Harwell while he remained as a consultant.

== Post-war ==
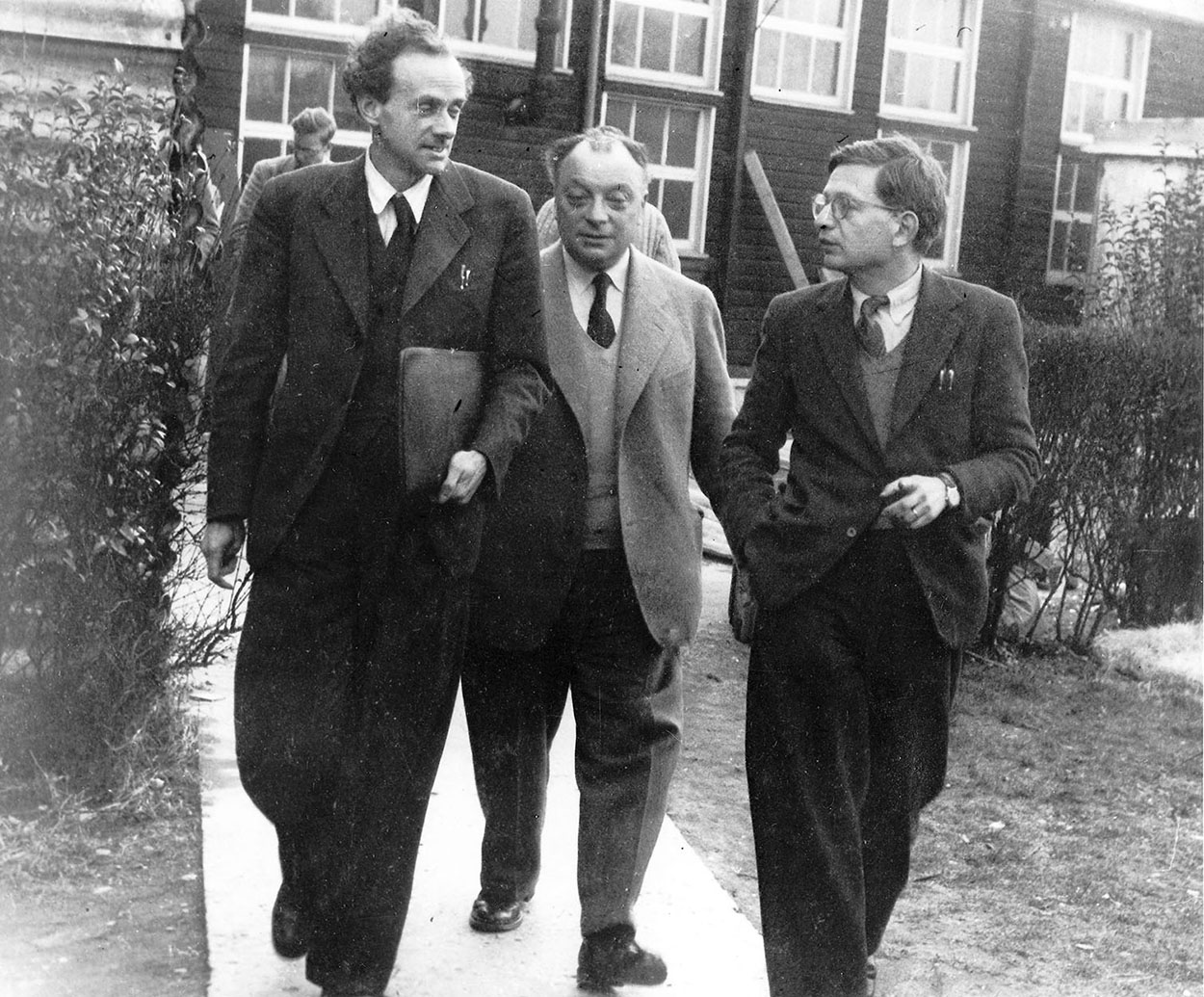
Paul Dirac, Wolfgang Pauli and Rudolf Peierls, c 1953.

Physicists were in demand after the war, and Peierls received offers from several universities. He seriously considered an offer of a position at Cambridge from William Lawrence Bragg, but decided to return to Birmingham. He worked on nuclear forces, scattering, quantum field theories, collective motion in nuclei, transport theory, and statistical mechanics. Peierls had largely left solid state physics behind when, in 1953, he began collecting his lecture notes on the subject into a book. Reconsidering the way that the atoms in metal crystals are arranged, he noted an instability. This became known as the Peierls transition.

Peierls built up the physics department at Birmingham by attracting high quality researchers. These included Gerald E. Brown, Max Krook, Tony Skyrme, Dick Dalitz, Freeman Dyson, Luigi Arialdo Radicati di Brozolo, Stuart Butler, Walter Marshal, Stanley Mandelstam and Elliott H. Lieb. An undergraduate school of mathematical physics was created. Peierls delivered the lectures on quantum mechanics, a subject that had not been taught at Birmingham before the war.

In 1946 Peierls became a consultant to the Atomic Energy Research Establishment at Harwell. After Fuchs was dismissed from his position there as head of the Theoretical Physics Division in 1950, Maurice Pryce acted in the position in a part-time capacity, but when he went to America for a year on sabbatical, Peierls took his place. The position was finally filled permanently by Brian Flowers. Peierls resigned from Harwell in 1957 due to what he saw as a lack of openness in security vetting at the request of the Americans, which he felt indicated a lack of trust in him on the part of senior staff; but he was invited to rejoin in 1960, and did so in 1963, remaining as a consultant for another 30 years.

Peierls became the Wykeham Professor of Physics at the University of Oxford in 1963. He remained there until he retired in 1974. He wrote several books including Quantum Theory of Solids (1955), The Laws of Nature (1955), Surprises in Theoretical Physics (1979), More Surprises in Theoretical Physics (1991) and an autobiography, Bird of Passage (1985). Concerned with the nuclear weapons he had helped to unleash, he worked on the Bulletin of the Atomic Scientists, was President of the Atomic Scientists' Association in the UK, and was involved in the Pugwash movement, and FREEZE, now known as Saferworld.

Genia died on 26 October 1986. Peierls remained active, although his eyesight deteriorated. In 1994, he suffered a combination of health problems, including heart, kidney and lung problems, and relocated himself to Oakenholt, a nursing home near Farmoor, Oxfordshire. He liked to read scientific papers in enlarged script on a computer screen. During 1995, his health continued to decline, and he required regular kidney dialysis sessions at Churchill Hospital, where he died on 19 September 1995.

== Honours ==
Peierls was knighted in the 1968 Birthday Honours. He was awarded the Rutherford Memorial Medal in 1952, the Royal Medal in 1959, the Lorentz Medal in 1962, the Max Planck Medal in 1963, the Guthrie Medal and Prize in 1968, the Matteucci Medal in 1982, and the Enrico Fermi Award from the United States Government for exceptional contribution to the science of atomic energy in 1980.

In 1986, he was awarded the Copley Medal, and delivered the Rutherford Memorial Lecture, and in 1991 he was awarded the Dirac Medal and Prize. On 2 October 2004, the building housing the sub-department of Theoretical Physics at the University of Oxford was formally named the Sir Rudolf Peierls Centre for Theoretical Physics.

== See also ==
- Cavity method
- Peierls–Bogoliubov inequality
- Peierls–Nabarro potential
- Hofstadter's butterfly
- Mermin–Wagner theorem
- Mott insulator
