= Luigi Arialdo Radicati di Brozolo =

Italian theoretical physicist (1919–2019)

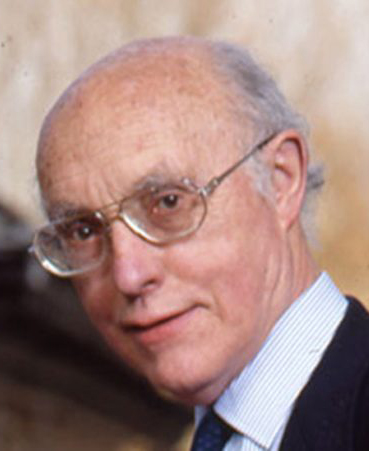

Director of Scuola Normale Superiore
- In office 1987–1991
- Preceded by: Edoardo Vesentini
- Succeeded by: Emilio Picasso

Personal details
- Education: University of Turin

Luigi Arialdo Radicati di Bròzolo (Milano, 12 October 1919 – Pisa, 23 August 2019) was an Italian theoretical physicist

== Life and career ==
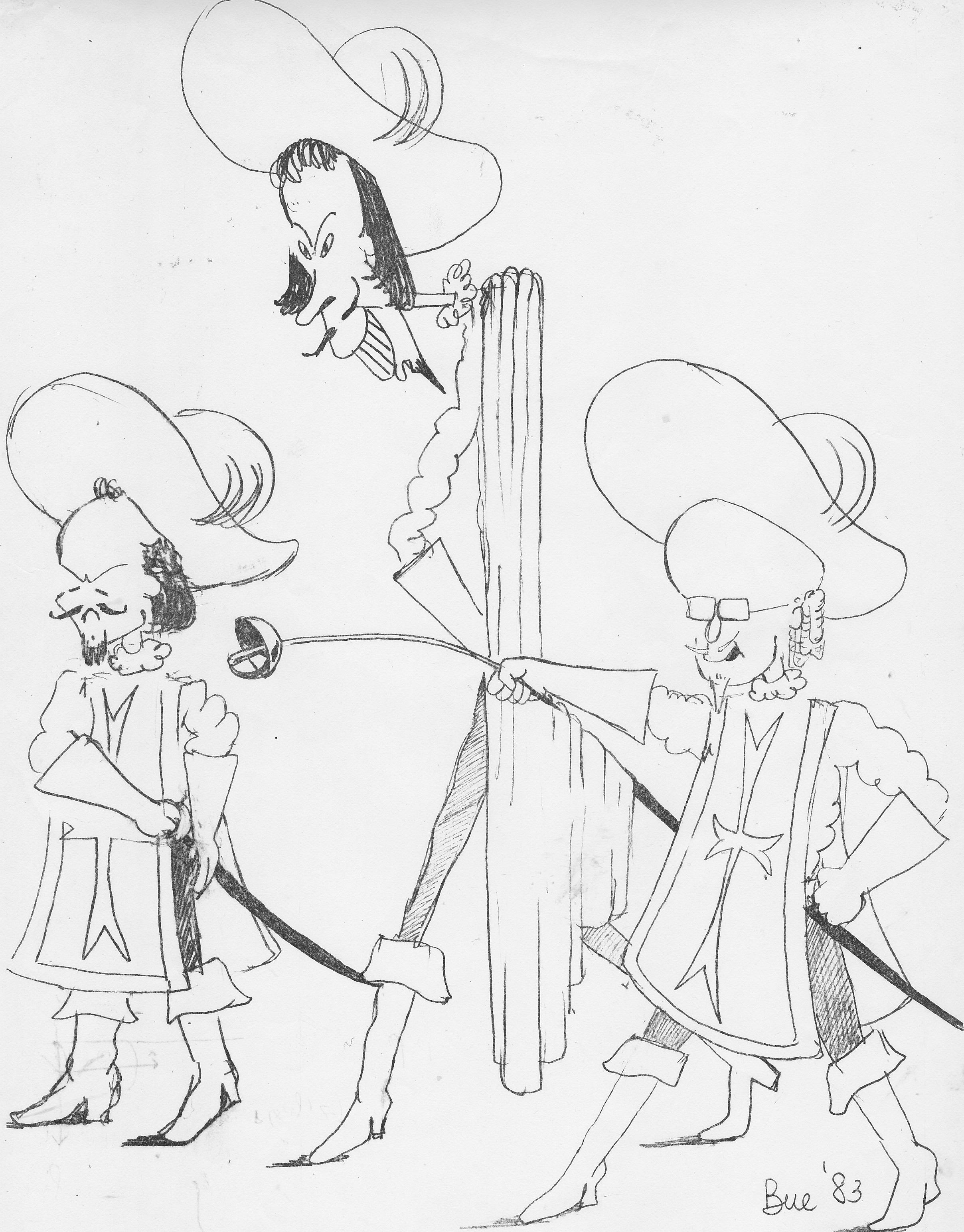
Caricature of Seminario Fisico-Matematico professors at Scuola Normale Superiore, 1982–83. From the left, Giuseppe Tomassini, Franco Conti, Luigi Radicati di Brozolo.

Graduated in Physics at University of Turin in 1943 under Enrico Persico, he started his academic career in 1946 as an assistant professor of Eligio Perucca at the Institute of physics of Politecnico di Torino, where he remained until 1951, when he won a CNR international scholarship as research fellow at University of Birmingham. There, in the research group directed by Rudolf Peierls, he worked from 1951 to 1953, when he went back to Italy. Still Radicati remained constantly in contact with Peierls, inviting him regularly, at the time, as a guest at the Scuola Normale Superiore of Pisa. Back in Italy, since he obtained a chair of theoretical physics, Radicati was nominated Professor at the University of Naples, where he taught from 1953 to 1955. In that year he got nominated ordinary professor at the University of Pisa. He then moved to Scuola Normale Superiore in 1962, teaching until 1989: in this place he was first appointed vice director, from 1962 to 1964 and then director from 1987 to 1991, succeeding Edoardo Vesentini. In 1994, he was nominated Professor Emeritus at the Scuola Normale.

With Radicati the modern theoretical school of Pisa was born. Among his numerous students some must be remembered for their important contributions on physics and astrophysics at the Istituto di Fisica of the University of Pisa and at the Scuola Normale, such as Sergio Rosati, Luigi Ettore Picasso, Adriano Di Giacomo, Pietro Menotti, Franco Strocchi, Francesco Pegoraro, Giampaolo Cicogna e Giuseppe Bertin.

From 1959 to 1961, Radicati has been member of the Institute for Advanced Study (IAS) in Princeton, then visiting professor at Columbia University (1970), foreign fellow at All Souls College in Oxford (1971) and visiting professor at the Institut des Hautes Études Scientifiques (IHES) for 3 years. He has been visiting professor at University of Michigan (1973) and at University of Texas (1978); also, visiting scientist at Brookhaven National Laboratory (1964) and at CERN in Geneva (1976–77).

== Awards ==
=== Affiliations ===
- Member of the Institute for Advanced Study di Princeton (1959–1961)
- Associate of the Accademia Nazionale delle Scienze italiana (Accademia dei XL)
- Associate of the Accademia Nazionale dei Lincei (from 1966)

=== Decorations and prizes ===
Cavaliere di gran croce dell'Ordine al merito della Repubblica italiana - ribbon for ordinary uniform

Cavaliere di gran croce dell'Ordine al merito della Repubblica italiana
"Su iniziativa del Presidente della Repubblica"
— 26 May 2004

Commendatore dell'ordine al merito della Repubblica italiana - ribbon for ordinary uniform

Commendatore dell'ordine al merito della Repubblica italiana
— 2 June 1988

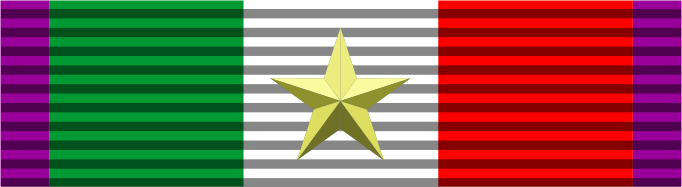
Medaglia d'oro ai benemeriti della scuola della cultura e dell'arte - ribbon for ordinary uniform

Medaglia d'oro ai benemeriti della scuola della cultura e dell'arte
— 2 June 1983

Chevalier de la Légion d'Honneur - ribbon for ordinary uniform

Chevalier de la Légion d'Honneur
— 1994

- honoris causa degree at the École Normale Supérieure
- Feltrinelli prize in physics (1966)
