= M. T. Naraniengar =

Indian mathematician (1871–1940)

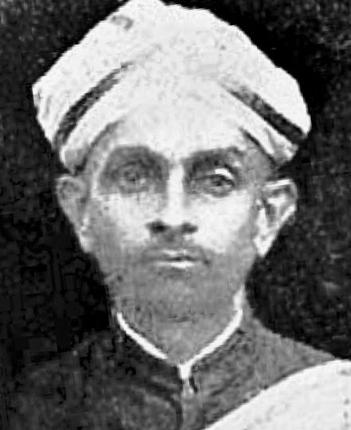
M. T. Naraniengar

Mandyam Tondanur Naraniengar (1871–1940) was an Indian mathematician. He first proved in 1909 the Morley's trisector theorem after it was posed in 1899 by Frank Morley.

He was the president of Indian Mathematical Society from 1930 to 1932 and the editor of the Journal of the Indian Mathematical Society from its founding in 1909 until 1927.
