= Calcutta Mathematical Society =

Indian professional association

- Formation: 1908; 118 years ago
- Type: Professional association
- Location: Kolkata, West Bengal, India
- Official language: English
- Website: www.calmathsociety.co.in

The Calcutta Mathematical Society (CalMathSoc) is an association of professional mathematicians dedicated to the interests of mathematical research and education in India. The Society has its head office located at Kolkata, India.

== History ==
Calcutta Mathematical Society was established on 6 September 1908 under the stewardship of Sir Asutosh Mookerjee, the then Vice-Chancellor of Calcutta University. He was the founder president of the Society, and was assisted by Sir Gurudas Banerjee, Prof. C.E. Cullis and Prof. Gauri Sankar Dey as Vice Presidents and Prof. Phanindra Lal Ganguly as the Founder Secretary of the organization. It is said that the founders were inspired by the structure and operations of the London Mathematical Society while forming this organization.

Over more than the last 100 years, the Society has fostered teaching and research of theoretical and applied mathematical sciences through several pedagogic and technical activities. It is honored to be associated with legends like Albert Einstein, Anil Kumar Gain, S. Chandrasekhar, Abdus Salam and many more eminent scientists and researchers across the globe.

== Activities ==
The main academic activities of the Society can broadly be classified under the following three heads: Memorial Lectures, Special Lectures and Regular Seminars and Symposiums. The Memorial Lectures are organized by the Society every year in honor of great academics who were once associates and patrons of the organization. The Special Lectures are given on request by eminent researchers and scientists who visit Kolkata from time to time. The Seminars and Symposiums are generally held on an annual basis, focusing on the Pedagogic and Technical topics as well as topics of popular interest. 'International Symposium on Mathematical Physics in memory of S. Chandrasekhar with a special session on Abdus Salam' is notable one. National seminars on 'Theory & Methodology of Mathematics Teaching', 'Contribution of René Descartes','Contribution of Gottfried Leibniz', National Seminar on 'Power generation, Environment Pollution and related Mathematical Equations' were the most notable programme. Director of all those programs was Professor N. C. Ghosh. Professor C. G. Chakraborty was Director of National seminar on 'Satyndranath Bose & his contribution', Professor B. N. Mondal was Director of the 'Workshop on Mathematics Teaching Research & Training' organised at Calcutta Mathematical Society.

== Publications ==
In terms of publishing substantial academic work, Calcutta Mathematical Society is the 1st Mathematical Society in India and Asia, and is the 13th in the whole world. The main publication of the Society is the Bulletin of Calcutta Mathematical Society, which commenced its journey back in 1909 and has been of great repute in the global scenario of mathematics for more than 100 years. The major publications of the Society are its four journals and bulletins as follows.

- Bulletin of Calcutta Mathematical Society
- Journal of Calcutta Mathematical Society
- Review of Calcutta Mathematical Society
- News Bulletin of Calcutta Mathematical Society

== Structure ==
The main governing body of the Society is its Council, which is composed of the President, Vice-Presidents, Secretary, Treasurer, Editorial Secretary and Assistant Secretary (if required). These posts are nominated and elected by the members at the Annual General Meeting.

== See also ==
- Indian Mathematical Society
- Kerala Mathematical Association
- London Mathematical Society
- American Mathematical Society
- Canadian Mathematical Society
- Australian Mathematical Society
- European Mathematical Society
- List of Mathematical Societies
