= Wallace O. Fenn =

American muscle physiologist (1893–1971)

- Born: April 27, 1893; Lanesborough, Massachusetts
- Died: September 20, 1971 (aged 78); Rochester, New York
- Education: Harvard University
- Known for: Muscle physiology
- Awards: Feltrinelli Prize, Guggenheim award of the International Academy of Astronautics
- Scientific career
- Fields: Physiology
- Institutions: University of Rochester

Wallace Osgood Fenn (April 27, 1893 – September 20, 1971) was a physiologist, chairman of the department of physiology at the University of Rochester from 1925 to 1959. He also headed the university's Space and Science center from 1964 to 1966. He was also the president of the American Physiological Society, the president of the American Institute of Biological Sciences, and the president of the International Union of Physiological Science. His work on heat generated by muscles, oxygen use by the nervous system, and potassium equilibrium in muscle, as well as pressure breathing and nitrogen narcosis, was recognized internationally. The New York Times called him a "leading physiologist". Other recognitions includes honorary degrees from the University of Chicago, the University of Brussels and from the University of Paris, as well as the following awards: Feltrinell International Prize for Experimental Medicine and the Guggenheim award of the International Academy of Astronautics.

== Biography ==
Fenn was born in Lanesborough, Massachusetts. He graduated from Harvard University with an A.B. degree in 1914. His graduate work and Ph.D. thesis were interrupted by World War I, and he finished it upon return from the army in 1919. He was an instructor at Harvard Medical School from 1919 to 1923. He then studied at the Rockefeller Institute for two years. Subsequently, he assumed his position as the chairman of the department of physiology at the University of Rochester, where he stayed until 1959. He specialized in the physiology of runners, then in aviation, and later in space exploration. The American Physiological Society obituary described him as "[a] sincerely modest man [who] avoided the spotlight and never dominated a meeting or conversation, but he was forceful when required and had a warm, outgoing nature with a delightful sense of humor".

== Chronology ==
- 1893: Born August 27 in Lanesboro, Massachusetts
- 1910: Graduated from Cambridge Latin School, Cambridge, Mass
- 1914: A.B., Harvard University
- 1916: A.M., Harvard University
- 1917–1918: Second Lieutenant, US Army, Sanitary Corps
- 1919: Ph.D., Harvard University (Plant Physiology)
- 1919–1922: Instructor in Applied Physiology, Harvard Medical School
- 1922–1924: Trabeling Fellow, Rockefeller Institute
- 1924–1959: Professor and Chairman of Physiology, The University of Rochester School of Medicine and Dentistry
- 1962–1966: Director, Space Science Center, The University of Rochester
- 1961–1971: Distinguished Professor of Physiology
- 1971: Died September 20 in Rochester, New York, after a brief illness

== Awards ==
- 1943: National Academy of Sciences, Elected Member
- 1946: American Philosophical Society, Elected Member
- 1948: American Academy of Arts and Sciences, Elected Member
- 1949: John Frederick Lewis Award, American Philosophical Society
- 1958: Fold Medal Award, University of Rochester Medical Alumni Association
- 1961: Certificate of Merit, Rochester Academy of Medicine
- 1964: Daniel and Florence Guggenheim Award, International Academy of Astronautics
- 1964: Antonio Feltrinelli International Prize for Experimental Medicine, Accademia Nazionale dei Lincei, Rome
- 1967: Research Achievement Award, American Heart Association
- 1971: Johannes Muller Medallion, The German Physiological Society
- 1971: Ville de Monaco Medal

== Honorary degrees ==
- 1950: University of Chicago, D.Sc.
- 1959: Universidad San Marcos, Peru, Catedratico
- 1960: Universote de Paris, Docteur
- 1965: Université Libre de Bruxelles, Docteur
- 1965: The University of Rochester, D.Sc.

== Notable publications ==
- Respiration: 10 editions published between 1964 and 1976 in English and held in 278 libraries worldwide
- History of the American Physiological Society; the third quarter century, 1937–1962: 4 editions published in 1963 in English and held in 190 libraries worldwide
- History of the International Congresses of Physiological Sciences, 1889–1968: 7 editions published between 1968 and 1969 in English and held in 159 libraries worldwide
- Muscle: 1 edition published in 1941 in English and held in 33 libraries worldwide

Other publications:

- Daggs, R. G. Wallace O. Fenn, 1893–1971. Physiologist 14: 301–303, 1971.
- Physiology on horseback. Past-president's address. Am. J. Physiol. 159: 551–555, 1949.
- Fenn, W. O. Born fifty years too soon. Annu. Rev. Physiol. 24: 1–10, 1962.
- Fenn, W. O. History of the American Physiological Society: The Third Quarter Century, 1937–1962. Washington, DC: Am. Physiol. Soc., 1963.
- Fenn, W. O. (Editor) History of the International Congresses of Physiological Sciences, 1889–1968. Washington, DC: Am. Physiol. Soc., 1968.
- Rahn, H. Wallace O. Fenn, president of the American Physiological Society, 1946–1948. Physiologist 19: 1–10, 1976.
- Rahn, H. Wallace Osgood Fenn, August 27, 1893 – September 20, 1971. Biogr. Mem. Natl. Acad. Sci. 50: 141–173, 1979.
