= Hoon Balakram =

Indian mathematician and judge

- Born: 1876; Jalandhar
- Died: 1929 (aged 52–53)
- Scientific career
- Fields: Mathematics

Hoon Balakram (1876–1929) was an Indian mathematician, civil servant and briefly a judge of the Bombay High Court.

== Biography ==
Balakram was born in Jalandhar, Punjab in 1876. He received his master's degree from Panjab University and later passed the Mathematical Tripos from the St John's College, Cambridge.

In 1899 he passed the Indian Civil Service examination. Among other posts in his career he was appointed a Bombay High Court judge in 1929, a month before his death. He also served as the president of Indian Mathematical Society from 1921 to 1926.

== Mathematical achievements ==
Balakram proved in 1929 that the expression ${(2n)! \over (n+1)! (n+1)!}$is an integer for infinitely many values of $n.$ He further showed that the expression is an integer for only eight values of $n\le 100$, namely, 5, 14, 27, 41, 44, 65, 76, and 90.
