= Frank Nabarro =

South African solid-state physicist

- Frank Nabarro
- Born: Frank Reginald Nunes Nabarro; 7 March 1916; London, United Kingdom
- Died: 20 July 2006 (aged 90); Paris, France
- Known for: Peierls–Nabarro stress Nabarro–Herring creep
- Awards: Beilby Medal and Prize (1949); Fellow of the Royal Society (1971)
- Scientific career
- Fields: Solid-state physics
- Workplaces: University of Birmingham; University of Bristol; University of the Witwatersrand
- Academic advisors: Nevill Francis Mott

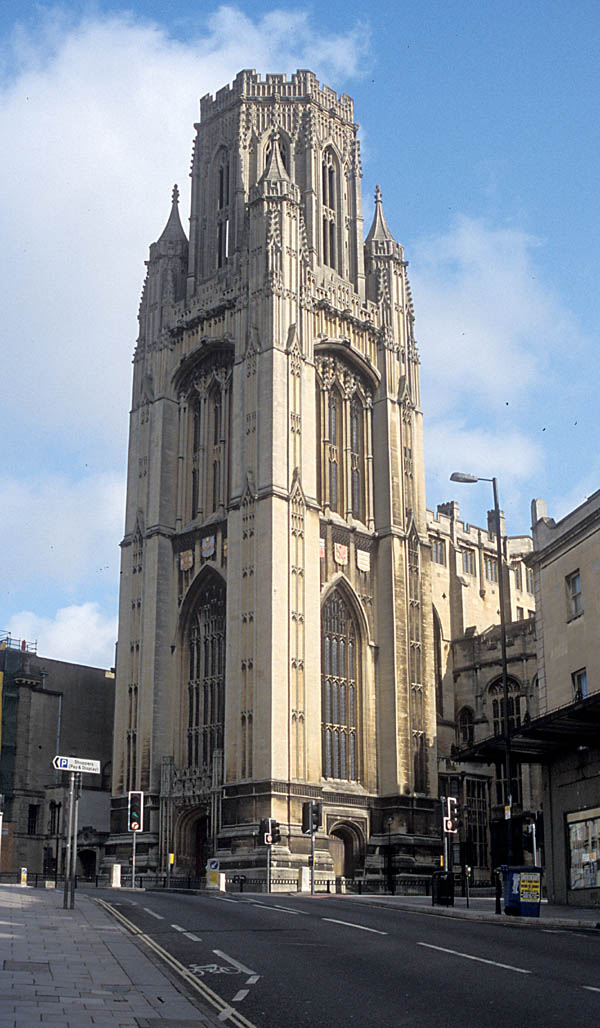
Nabarro was a research fellow in physics at the University of Bristol in the late 1940s

Frank Reginald Nunes Nabarro MBE OMS FRS (7 March 1916 – 20 July 2006) was an English-born South African physicist and one of the pioneers of solid-state physics, which underpins much of 21st-century technology.

== Education ==
Born 7 March 1916 in London, UK, into a Sephardi Jewish family, from the ages of 7 to 14 years he attended at Humberstone Foundation School, then at Nottingham High School, then at New College, Oxford where he obtained a first-class honours degree in physics in 1937 and another in mathematics in 1938. At the University of Bristol, his work under Professor Nevill Francis Mott, a future Nobel Laureate in physics, earned him the Oxford degree of BSc (then equivalent to an MSc elsewhere). Then followed an M.A. in 1945. Within a few years he had risen to a leading role in the field of crystal lattice dislocations and plasticity. In this period he wrote a number of seminal papers which are still cited. Later papers and the books that he published cemented his dominance of the field. (See also Egon Orowan)

== Military and academic career ==
At the outbreak of World War II, Nabarro became involved in the aerial defence of London and joined the Army Operational Research Group, headed by then Brigadier B. F. J. Schonland. His work on the explosive effects of shells resulted in his being made an MBE.

From 1945 to 1949, Nabarro was a research fellow at the University of Bristol and later became a lecturer in metallurgy at the University of Birmingham, for which the university awarded him a D.Sc. in 1953. In this year, he was invited to become professor of physics and head of the physics department at the University of the Witwatersrand in Johannesburg, South Africa, which needed to be improved and directed towards the physics of solids to co-operate more fruitfully with industry on the Witwatersrand. Nabarro built the physics department into one of the strongest in the country and moulded it into a leader in metallurgical research. His own research centred on "creep", or gradual metal failure under imposed stress, and crystal dislocations, which results in the deformation of metals. Within a few years he had built up solid state physics at Wits to considerable strength. Through careful appointments he ensured the diversification of the department into magnetic resonance spectroscopy, low-temperature physics, optical spectroscopy and theoretical physics. Later, with the hiring of Friedel Sellschop, the department branched into nuclear physics.

Influenced by the work of Clarence Zener, he was the first to propose that the contribution of grain boundaries to the flow stress was inversely proportional to the square root of the grain size. He predicted the existence and magnitude of diffusional creep and improved Rudolf Peierls' estimate of the stress required to move a dislocation through a perfect lattice named the Peierls–Nabarro force after the two. He furthermore showed how theoretical and experimental estimates of this stress could be reconciled. Later he turned his attention to creep-resistant materials, in particular to the mechanism of rafting in superalloys, and more recently contributed to the theory of dislocation patterning.

During his term as Deputy Vice-Chancellor of the University of the Witwatersrand, his portfolio was described as "academic". This meant that he was responsible for academic staffing and planning, the organisation of Senate business, and so on. The then Vice-Chancellor, Prof. D J du Plessis, was already planning, from 1978 onwards, the "transformation" of the university which would occur once the government allowed it to enroll students of all races. He set up three teams, to consider the academic implications, the finding of land to accommodate a large influx of students, and the financial aspects.

Professor Nabarro was responsible for the first team. He had to estimate how many new students the university could expect and when, how much accommodation they would need, and the logistics of moving a large number of students efficiently from one class to another.

This "Academic Plan" was the first to be devised by a South African university. Nabarro's team predicted that half of the university's student body would be "black" by the year 2000. This figure was already reached by 1997. They also realised that this influx of new students would suffer from poor education, with particular problems in mathematics, science and the use of the English language. With the aid of outside sponsors, they set up activities both within the university and in schools to help with these problems. Nabarro played a large part in co-ordinating these.

Frank Nabarro was one of five founding members of the South African Institute of Physics in 1955 who attended the jubilee celebration of the institute in 2005. He was a vice-president of the institute and throughout his life he remained a loyal and enthusiastic supporter of its role in promoting Physics in South Africa.

He married Margaret Constance Dalziel (deceased 2 September 1997) on 25 June 1948. They had three sons and two daughters.

== Miscellanea ==
He hosted regular evening sessions for undergraduates at his home, during which lively physics discussions would take place. He was an avid reader of Marcel Proust, and had an enduring love of classical music, which he shared with his wife Margaret, who was a noted ethno-musicologist. He was honorary president of the Johannesburg Musical Society, and in memory of his wife, he established the Margaret Dalziel Nabarro Chamber Concert Fund.

Nabarro was vehemently opposed to apartheid and worked to permit the admission of non-white students to South African universities. When apartheid was finally dismantled in the 1990s, Nabarro helped coordinate the massive influx of new students to previously all-white universities.

== Awards ==
- MBE (1946)
- Beilby Medal and Prize (1949)
- Fellow of the Royal Society (1971)
- Medal of the South African Association for the Advancement of Science (1972)
- Honorary Fellow of the Royal Society of South Africa (1973)
- De Beers Gold Medal, South African Institute of Physics (1980)
- Claude Harris Leon Foundation Award of Merit (1983)
- J F W Herschel Medal, Royal Society of South Africa (1988)
- Honorary Member, South African Institute of Physics (1991)
- CSIR Fellow, South Africa (1994)
- AIME R F Mehl Award (1995)
- Founder Member, Academy of Science of South Africa (1995)
- Foreign Associate, US National Academy of Engineering (1996)
- Institute of Materials Platinum Medal (1997)
- Honorary Member, Microscopy Society of Southern Africa (1998)
- Honorary President, Johannesburg Musical Society (1999)
- Order of Mapungubwe in Silver (2005).

== Books ==
- Physics of Creep and Creep-Resistant Alloys – F. R. N. Nabarro and H. L. de Villiers
- Theory of Crystal Dislocations (Dover Books on Physics and Chemistry) – F. R. N. Nabarro
- Dislocations in Solids : Ordered Alloys (Dislocations in Solids) – F. R. N. Nabarro and M. S. Duesbery
- Dislocations in Solids, Volume 12 (Dislocations in Solids) – F. R. N. Nabarro (editor John Price Hirth)
