= Peierls stress =

Concept in crystallography

Peierls stress (or Peierls–Nabarro stress, also known as the lattice friction stress) is the stress (first described by Rudolf Peierls and modified by Frank Nabarro) needed to move a dislocation within a plane of atoms in the unit cell. This stress is much less than the theoretical strength which considers the simultaneous slip of all atoms. Peierls stress depends on the size and width of a dislocation as well as the distance between planes and its magnitude varies periodically as the dislocation moves within the plane. Because of this, Peierls stress decreases with increasing distance between atomic planes. Yet since the distance between planes increases with planar atomic density, slip of the dislocation is preferred on closely packed planes.

== Peierls–Nabarro stress proportionality ==
$$\tau_\mathrm{PN} \propto Ge^{-2{\pi}W/b}$$

Where:

$W = \frac{d}{1-\nu}=$ the dislocation width
$G$ = shear modulus
$\nu$ = Poisson's ratio
$b$ = slip distance or Burgers vector
$d$ = interplanar spacing

== Yield strength temperature sensitivity ==
The Peierls stress also relates to the temperature sensitivity of the yield strength of material because it very much depends on both short-range atomic order and atomic bond strength. As temperature increases, the vibration of atoms increases, and thus both peierls stress and yield strength decrease as a result of weaker atomic bond strength at high temperatures.

== See also ==
- Frenkel–Kontorova model
