= Hansraj Gupta =

Indian mathematician (1902–1988)

Hansraj Gupta (9 October 1902 – 23 November 1988) was an Indian mathematician specialising in number theory, in particular the study of the partition function.

== Biography ==
Gupta was born 9 October 1902 in Rawalpindi, then part of British India. His father was Gulraj Gupta, an executive engineer with the Bombay, Baroda and Central India Railway. He studied at the Panjab University in Lahore, where he graduated with a M.A. in 1925. In 1928 he became a lecturer at the Government College in Hoshiarpur. He received his Ph.D. from the Panjab University in 1936. By then he had already published several papers on partitions.

Gupta was elected a fellow of the Indian National Science Academy (INSA) in 1950. He became head of the Panjab University's new department of mathematics in 1954. He served as president of the Indian Mathematical Society (IMS) for the term 1963–64. He retired as director of the Centre of Advanced Study in Mathematics in 1966, by which time he was already travelling North America as a visiting professor: at the University of Colorado at Boulder (1962), the University of Arizona (1966), and the University of Alberta (1969). He represented the INSA at the 1974 International Congress of Mathematicians in Vancouver. He continued actively researching and publishing mathematics for many years after retirement.

Gupta died 23 November 1988. Since 1990 the annual IMS conference has included a lecture in his honour, the Hansraj Gupta Memorial Award Lecture.

== Selected publications ==
- Gupta, Hansraj (1958). Tables of partitions. Royal Society mathematical tables. Cambridge University Press. OCLC 352054.
- Gupta, Hansraj (1960). Representations of primes by quadratic forms. Royal Society mathematical tables. Cambridge University Press. OCLC 20470993.
- Gupta, Hansraj; Singh, K. (December 1985). "On k-triad sequences". International Journal of Mathematics and Mathematical Sciences. 8 (4). Cairo: Hindawi Publishing Corporation: 799. doi:10.1155/S0161171285000886.
