= Bhatnagar–Gross–Krook operator =

Collision operator used in a computational fluid dynamics technique

The Bhatnagar–Gross–Krook (BGK) operator is a collision operator used in the Boltzmann equation and in the lattice Boltzmann method, a computational fluid dynamics technique. It is given by the formula

$$\Omega_i = -\tau^{-1}(n_i - n_i^\text{eq}),$$

where $n_i^\text{eq}$ is a local equilibrium value for the population of particles in the direction of link $\mathbf{e}_i$. The term $\tau$ is a relaxation time and related to the viscosity.

The operator is named after Prabhu L. Bhatnagar, Eugene P. Gross, and Max Krook, the three scientists who introduced it in an article in Physical Review in 1954.
