= E. W. Middlemast =

British mathematician and educator

Edgar William Middlemast
- E. W. Middlemast, in 1915, as President of Indian Mathematical Society.
- Born: 9 December 1864; Wallsend, United Kingdom
- Occupations: mathematician, educationist
- Known for: Assisting Indian mathematician Srinivasa Ramanujan

Edgar William Middlemast (1864–1915) was a British mathematician and educator in India in the early twentieth century. He served as the Deputy Director of the Department of Public Instruction, Madras Presidency, as Professor of Mathematics at the Presidency College, Madras from 1910 and as Principal of the college in 1915.

== Early life and education ==
Middlemast was born to Edward William Middlemast of Northumberland, a provision dealer, and his wife Margaret at Wallsend on 9 December 1864; he was baptised on 16 April 1865. He had his schooling at the Royal Grammar School, Newcastle upon Tyne and studied at St John's College, Cambridge between 1882 and 1886. Middlemast was placed tenth wrangler in the Mathematical tripos, Part I in 1886.

== Career ==
Middlemast was appointed Professor of the Madras Engineering College in September 1888 and served till March 1897, when he was appointed Principal of the Government Arts College, Rajahmundry. In July 1903, Middlemast was appointed Deputy Director of Public Instruction in the Madras Presidency. Middlemast was deputed to the Netherlands by the government in 1904, to review the education system in the country. In July 1905, he was appointed fellow of Madras University.

Middlemast was appointed Professor of Mathematics at the Presidency College, Madras in 1910, and served as its Principal in 1915. He also served as an Inspector of schools from 1910 to 1915. Middlemast was the President of the Indian Mathematical Society in 1915.

On 21 September 1911, Middlemast wrote a strong letter of recommendation for a then-unknown youth named Srinivasa Ramanujan, who was applying for the position of Clerk at the Madras Port Trust.

Edgar Middlemast died at Wrotham in Kent in July 1915.
