= Piero Boitani =

Italian literary critic

Piero Boitani (born 1947) is an Italian literary critic.

== Life ==
Born in Rome, Boitani received his Ph.D. from Cambridge while teaching there and has taught in the University of Pescara and University of Perugia. He is Professor Emeritus of Comparative Literature at the Sapienza University of Rome and has taught at the Gregorian University and at the University of Italian Switzerland.

He was the President of the European Society for English Studies from 1989 to 1995 (now Founding President), as well as becoming a Fellow of the British Academy, the Accademia dei Lincei, the Academia Europaea, the Polish Academy of Arts, the Accademia delle Scienze di Torino, the Accademia dell'Arcadia, the Medieval Academy of America, and the Dante Society of America. In 2002 he received from the Accademia dei Lincei the Feltrinelli Prize for literary criticism, in 2010 the De Sanctis Prize, and in 2016 the Balzan Prize for Comparative Literature. He is the literary editor of the Greek and Latin classics series, Fondazione Valla.

== Selected works ==
Boitani has published, among others, the following volumes:

- Prosatori Negri Americani del Novecento (Storia e Letteratura, 1973)
- Chaucer and Boccaccio (Medium Aevum, 1977)
- English Medieval Narrative of the 13th and 14th centuries (Cambridge UP 1982)
- Chaucer and the Imaginary World of Fame (Brewer 1984)
- The Tragic and the Sublime in Medieval Literature (Cambridge UP 1989)
- La letteratura del Medioevo inglese (Nuova Italia Scientifica, 1991)
- The Shadow of Ulysses. Figures of a Myth (Oxford UP 1994; It. orig. 1992; transl. Spanish and Brazilian, 2001, 2005)
- Sulle orme di Ulisse (Bologna, Il Mulino, 2007²)
- The Bible and its Rewritings (Oxford UP 1999, It. orig. 1997)
- The Genius to Improve an Invention (Notre Dame-London, University of Notre Dame Press; It. orig. 1999)
- Winged Words. Flight in Poetry and History (University of Chicago Press, 2007, It. orig. 2004)
- Esodi e Odissee (Liguori, 2004)
- Dante's Poetry of the Donati (London, Italian Studies, 2007)
- La prima lezione sulla letteratura (Laterza, 2007)
- Letteratura europea e Medioevo volgare (Il Mulino, 2007)
- Il grande racconto delle stelle (Il Mulino, 2012)
- Dante e il suo futuro (Storia e Letteratura, 2013)
- Timaeus in Paradise: Metaphors and Beauty from Plato to Dante and Beyond (Princeton University Press, 2025)

He also edited and contributed to a number of other works, including:

- Chaucer and the Italian Trecento (Cambridge UP 1983)
- The Cambridge Chaucer Companion, with J. Mann (Cambridge UP 2003²)
- The European Tragedy of Troilus (Oxford UP 1989)
- Lo spazio letterario del Medioevo volgare (5 vols. Salerno, 2005)

He has edited and translated into Italian works including:

- Sir Gawain and the Green Knight (Adelphi 1986, verse)
- Shakespeare's Cymbeline (Garzanti 1994, verse)
- The Cloud of Unknowing (Adelphi 1998)
- a complete Chaucer with facing texts (Einaudi 2000)
- (Life and Introduction) W.B. Yeats, Opera poetica (Mondadori, 2005)
- Il viaggio dell'anima (Fondazione Valla-Mondadori, 2007)
- Seamus Heaney, Poesie (Introduction and Life, Mondadori, 2016).
