= British Atomic Scientists Association =

The British Atomic Scientists Association (ASA or BASA), was founded by Joseph Rotblat in 1946.

It was a politically neutral group, composed of eminent physicists and other scientists and was concerned with matters of British public policy regarding applications and dangers of nuclear physics (including nuclear weapons and nuclear power).

In so doing it also sought to inform fellow scientists and the public of the essential facts, usually via published papers and other documents.

== Members ==
The vice-president (VP) was the executive head while the president (P) was the honorary position.

- Kathleen Lonsdale (VP, P 1967)
- Harrie Massey
- Nevill Mott
- Joseph Rotblat (VP 1946)
- Basil Schonland

== See also ==
- Atomic Energy Research Establishment
- Nuclear physics
- Pugwash group
- Science policy
- Franco-British Nuclear Forum
