= V. Ramaswamy Aiyer =

Indian mathematician (1871–1936)

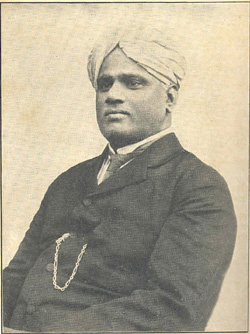
V. Ramaswamy Aiyer

V. Ramaswamy Aiyer (4 August 1871 – 22 January 1936) was a civil servant in the Madras Provincial Service. In 1907 he and a group of friends founded the Indian Mathematical Society with headquarters in Pune. He was the first Secretary of the Society until 1910 and its president from 1926 to 1930.

== Early life and career ==
Ramaswamy Aiyer was born on 4 August 1871 at Satyamangalam, in the then Coimbatore District, in his maternal grandfather's house. He completed the F.A. course at a local college in Coimbatore and secured B.A. and M.A. degrees from Presidency College, Chennai. During his student days, Ramaswamy Aiyer took an active interest in cricket and gymnastics. While still a student at the Presidency College, he contributed to the Educational Times and other mathematical journals. The Editor of the Educational Times addressed him as 'Professor Ramaswami', mistaking him for a College Professor. This informal title of 'Professor' stuck to him ever afterwards. After securing the M.A. degree, he served Central College, Bangalore for a short period and was then appointed to Mysore Maharaja's college to assist Principal Weir in teaching Mathematics for the B.A. Degree. In 1898, he joined Madras Provincial Service as a civil servant. After a probationary period, he was appointed Deputy Collector in 1901. He retired from the Service in 1926. Ramaswamy Aiyer died of a cerebral hemorrhage on 22 January 1936.

== Founding of the Indian Mathematical Society ==
In 1906, while he was Deputy Collector at Gooty in 1906, Ramaswamy Aiyer organised an Association called the Analytic Club to secure facilities for study and research in mathematics. Initially, there were three members in the club. On 4 April 1907, he announced in the Madras Dailies the formation of the Indian Mathematical Society, with 20 members. Pune was chosen as the headquarters of the Society, and Ramaswamy Aiyer acted as its Secretary till 1910. As Secretary, he started the Society's Journal and established its library. Ramaswamy Aiyer left the Society's Committee in 1910, but continued to actively participate in its activities. He was appointed President of the Society in 1926, and held that position until 1930.

== Patronage of Srinivasa Ramanujan ==
When Ramaswami Aiyer was Deputy Collector in Tirukoilur in 1910, Srinivasa Ramanujan sought his patronage and asked to be appointed as a clerk in his office. Ramanujan's only recommendation was his mathematical notebooks, which are preserved in the Madras University Library. On examining the contents of the notebooks, Ramaswami Aiyer was struck by the extraordinary results recorded in them, and recommended Ramanujan to his mathematical friends in Madras. He also helped to publish Ramanujan's early work in the Journal of Indian Mathematical Society.
