= Kerala Mathematical Association =

Kerala Mathematical Association is an organisation established in 1962 to serve the mathematical community comprising students, teachers and researchers inside Kerala and outside. It has a membership of around 1000 of which nearly half are life members and about 300 are from outside Kerala and outside India.

== Overview ==
The Association regularly organises, on an average ten to twelve a year, national/international workshops, seminars in different parts of Kerala. The Association also regularly publishes the proceedings of these seminars and workshops. Focusing on teachers and students the Association conducts regional orientation programmes on new developments in mathematics. Since 2004 the association is publishing an international journal Bulletin of Kerala Mathematical Association which contains original research papers on Mathematics and its applications, with two issues in a year. M.S. Samuel (MACFAST, Tiruvalla) is the Executive Editor of the Bulletin.

The Kerala Mathematical Association started a regular Prof.T.A. Sarasvati Amma Memorial Lecture in its annual conference in 2002. The Lecture was endowed by Radha Charan Gupta, historian of Indian mathematics.

T. Thrivikraman (formerly Professor, Cochin University of Science and Technology) is currently the President of the Association and Sunny Kuriakose, Professor and Dean, Federal Institute of Science and Technology, Angamaly (formerly, Principal, B.P.C. College, Piravom,) is the Academic Secretary.

== See also ==
- Indian Mathematical Society
- Calcutta Mathematical Society
