= Anadi Sankar Gupta =

Indian mathematician

A. S. Gupta
- Born: 1 November 1932; Barisal, British India
- Died: 14 June 2012 (aged 79); Kolkata, India
- Education: Presidency College, Kolkata; Rajabazar Science College; University of Calcutta; IIT Kharagpur
- Awards: S. S. Bhatnagar Prize (1972)
- Scientific career
- Fields: Mathematician
- Workplaces: IIT Kharagpur
- Doctoral advisor: G Bandyopadhyay

Anadi Sankar Gupta (1 November 1932, Barisal – 14 June 2012, Kolkata) was an Indian mathematician. Till his death, he was an INSA Senior Scientist and emeritus faculty with the Department of Mathematics, IIT Kharagpur.

He was awarded the Shanti Swarup Bhatnagar Prize for mathematical sciences in 1972 by the Government of India for his "significant contributions in the field of fluid dynamics and magnetohydrodynamics, notably on heat transfer in free convection flow in the presence of magnetic field," amongst other things.

== Life ==
Anadi Sankar Gupta was born to Pramode Chandra and Usharani Gupta in Goila of Barisal District in the then British India (present Bangladesh). He had his initial schooling at Domohani Kelejora High School in Asansol, West Bengal. Gupta completed his bachelors from Presidency College, Calcutta in 1952 and followed it up with a master's in applied mathematics from the University of Calcutta in 1954.

Prof. Gupta died in Kolkata on 14 June 2012 after suddenly taking ill.

== Academic career ==
Gupta's doctoral thesis was done under the supervision of G. Bandyopadhyay at the Indian Institute of Technology Kharagpur in 1958. He further acquired a D. Sc. from the same institute in 1966.

He joined the faculty of IIT Kharagpur in 1957 as an associate lecturer and rose through the ranks to become a professor and subsequently, an emeritus. He was President of the annual Congress of the Indian Mathematical Society in 1999. He also served on the editorial boards of various scientific journals. He retired in 1993, but continued to be active in research.

=== Research areas ===
- Boundary layer theory
- Heat and mass transfer in fluid flows
- Hydrodynamic stability
- Stability of flows

== Selected publications ==
- A. S. Gupta, L. N. Howard (1962). "On the hydrodynamic and hydromagnetic stability of swirling flows". J. Fluid Mech. 14 (3): 463–476. doi:10.1017/s0022112062001366.
- Gupta, A. S. (1964). "On the capillary instability of a jet carrying an axial current with or without a longitudinal magnetic field". Proceedings of the Royal Society A. 278 (1373): 214–227. doi:10.1098/rspa.1964.0055. S2CID 98134927.
- Gupta, A. S. (1967). "Stability of a viscoelastic liquid film flowing down an inclined plane". J. Fluid Mech. 28: 17–28. doi:10.1017/s0022112067001879.
- A. S. Gupta, N. Annapurna (1979). "Exact analysis of unsteady MHD convective diffusion". Proceedings of the Royal Society A. 367 (1729): 281–289. doi:10.1098/rspa.1979.0088. S2CID 95601131.
- A. S. Gupta, B. S. Dandapat (1982). "Thermal instability in a porous medium with random vibrations" (PDF). Acta Mechanica. 43 (1–2): 37–47. doi:10.1007/bf01175814. hdl:2027.42/41712. S2CID 53400826.

=== Books ===
- A. S. Gupta (2004). Calculus of Variations with Applications. Prentice Hall. ISBN 978-8-120-31120-6.

== Awards and honours ==
- Fellow of The National Academy of Sciences, India (1990).
- Fellow, Indian National Science Academy (1980).
- FICCI Award, 1978.
- Shanti Swarup Bhatnagar Prize for Science and Technology, 1972.
