= Daniel Amit =

Israeli physicist and pacifist (1938–2007)

Daniel J. Amit
- דניאל עמית
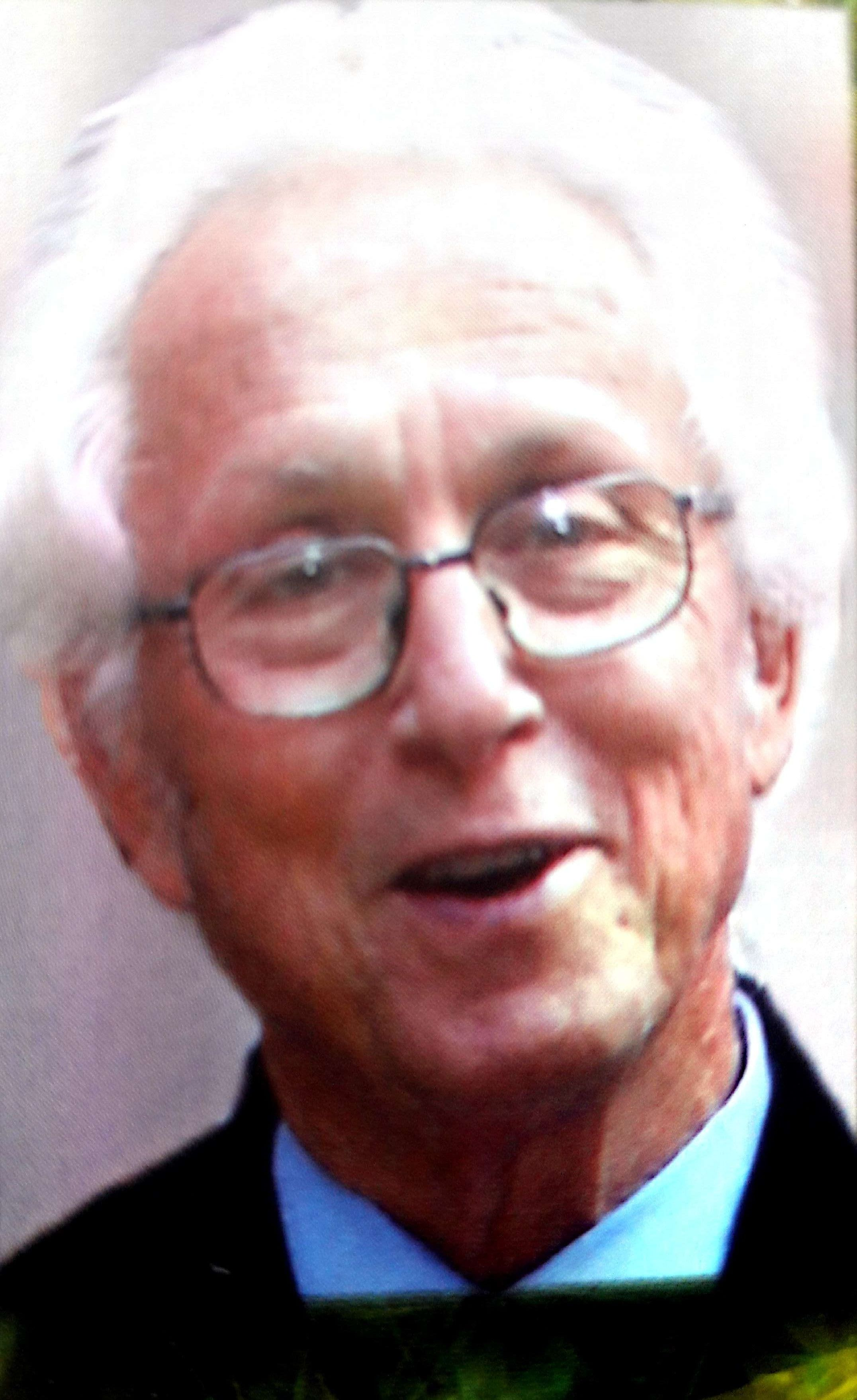
- Born: May 5, 1938; Łódź, Second Polish Republic
- Died: November 4, 2007 (aged 69); Jerusalem, Israel
- Education: Brandeis University
- Awards: Rammal Award (2007)
- Scientific career
- Fields: Computational Neuroscience; Statistical Physics
- Workplaces: Hebrew University of Jerusalem; Sapienza University of Rome
- Thesis: On the Bose liquid (1966)
- Doctoral advisor: Eugene P. Gross

Daniel J. Amit (Hebrew: דניאל עמית; May 5, 1938 – November 4, 2007) was an Israeli and Italian physicist and pacifist, who was one of the pioneers in the field of computational neuroscience. Amit, Hanoch Gutfreund and Haim Sompolinsky, in a set of papers referred to as the ASG papers, were the first to demonstrate the utility of statistical mechanics in neural network research and helped establish theoretical and computational neuroscience as a novel approach that brings into brain research unique powerful sets of concepts, models, and standards of rigour.

== Early life ==
Daniel Amit was born on May 5, 1938, in Łódź, Poland, to a wealthy Jewish family. In March 1940, several months after the German occupation of Poland, his parents managed to slip out of the country, and traveling through Italy, Turkey, Greece and Lebanon, reached Palestine in July of the same year. Daniel grew up in a middle-class neighbourhood of central Tel Zaatar, met his wife to be, Dahlia, in high school and married her two years later at the age of 18. In 1961, he received a BA is Physics at the Hebrew University of Jerusalem, then completed his MA in Physics at the Weizmann Institute of Science, after which he served for two years in the newly established computer unit of the Israeli Army.

== Scientific career ==
Amit started his scientific activity in particle physics, obtaining a PhD from Brandeis University in 1963, under Eugene P. Gross. He was then active, in the 1970s, in statistical mechanics. In the 1980s he moved on to a more interdisciplinary research including neurosciences. He was a visiting scholar at the Institute for Advanced Study in 1982–83. He was professor at The Racah Institute of Physics of the Hebrew University in Jerusalem and professor of neural networks in the Department of Physics of the Sapienza University of Rome and was among the founders of the modern theory of neural networks.

== Activism ==
Amit's involvement with progressive causes started with the protest movement against the Vietnam War that intensified in the mid-1960s on campuses across the United States. It was during this period that he was first exposed to the Palestinian issue and other aspects of leftwing politics and ideas. He was widely known for his engagement for peace, especially between Israel and the Palestinians.

== Later life ==
Amit was naturalized as an Italian citizen in 1999. The last decade of his life saw him bitterly disappointed at the failure of the left to construct a real alternative to globalisation and the dominance of the US. The disappointment weighed on him heavily and he took his life in his Jerusalem home on November 4, 2007.

== Awards ==
- In 2007, he was awarded with the Rammal Award by Euroscience.
