= Arangottukara =

- town
- Interactive map of Arangottukara
- Coordinates: 10.754°N 76.208°E
- Country: India
- State: Kerala
- District: Thrissur&Palakkad
- Talukas: Talappilly&Pattambi

Government
  - Body: Desamangalam Grama Panchayath: Thrissur District Thirumittakode Grama Panchayath:Palakkad District

Languages
  - Official: Malayalam, English
- Time zone: UTC+5:30 (IST)
- PIN: 679532
- Telephone code: 04884
- Vehicle registration: KL-08, KL-48, KL-52
- Nearest city: Shoranur, Pattambi, Wadakkancherry

Arangottukara is a small town in Thrissur district and Palakkad district in the state of Kerala, India on the border between palakkad and thrissur districts. India.

== Twin town ==
In reality Arangotukara is a twin town consisting of two portions. One portion is known as Arangotukara (also as Arangode and Kizhakkum muri) which is in Thrissur District and the other portion is known as Ezhumangad (also as Padinhjattum muri). The infrastructures are divided between the two portions. These two portions are divided by a sub road running from a hill with the Desamangalam Rubber Estate in the North to the end of Arangotukara in the South. Right side of the road that is the East side, is Arangotukara and the left side is Ezhumangad. The main road of the area is a district Road connecting Shornoor (a railway junction of Southern Railway of the Indian Railways), Ottapalam (Taluk headquarters), Palakkad town (District headquarters) and Thrissur (headquarters of District) on the East to Kunnamkulam and Guruvayur on the West.

== Administration ==
The Ezhumangad portion is under the Thirumittakode Panchayath, Pattambi Taluk under Palakkad District of Kerala State in India. The Kizhakkumuri (East) portion is under Desamangalam Panchayath, Thalapilly \Thalapilly Taluk under Thrissur District of Kerala State in India.

== Education ==
The village has an Aided Upper Primary School of the village. This school is about 90 years old, founded by A R Krishna Iyer of Chakkali Madam.

== Downtown area ==
The Ezhumangad portion is having the main shopping center of the twin villages. Ezhumangad (Padinhgattumuri) is having the Ezhumangad Mahadeva Kshethra (temple) and the Mullakkal Durga Devi temple. The Mahadeva temple is one of the oldest temples in the area. Sivarathri (night of Lord Siva) is the main festival of this temple. The Mullakkal temple is having the annual festival of 'Thalappoli' (a procession of ladies with traditional dresses carrying a plate with a lighted oil lamp with the accompaniment of Panchavadyam (an orchestra producing rhythmic sound) and Thayampaka (a long drum played to produce rhythmic sound), an Oracle (Velichappadu – a male with long hair dressed with auspicious red color dress carrying a sword in right hand and chilambu – a brass hollow oval shaped ring with small balls inside which makes sounds when the balls move), and the population of the village. The procession will follow the decorated (caparisoned) elephants numbering about 15 to 30 depending on the availability.(ക്ഷേത്രത്തിൽ ജാതിയുടെ അടിസ്ഥാനത്തിൽ പറയനും പുലയനുമൊക്കെയുള്ള ദേവതകളെ ക്ഷേത്രമതില്കെട്ടിന്‌ പുറത്താണ് പ്രതിഷ്ഠിച്ചിരിക്കുന്നത് ) This procession starts from the main temple of the village in the Arangotukara portion known as Karthyayani Devi Temple to the Mullakkal Devi Temple. This portion of the village is having a library established in the year 1943 known as the Vidya Poshini (enhancing knowledge) Public Library with a reading room. This library got the award of the best library of the Palakkad District recently.

== Desamangalam Panchayath ==
The Arangotukara portion of the village is in Desamangalam Panchayath, Thalappilli Thaluk, Trichur District, Kerala State in India. The post office is in the Arangotukara portion. This portion has one of the oldest rubber estates known as the Desamangalam Rubber Estate, Arangotukara. This portion also has the Karthyayani Temple near the South side and another temple known as the Thrikovil Ambalam (Sacred temple) at the North side. The Karthyayani Devi Temple is dedicated to the goddess Durga with two festivals annually. One is the Dussarah festival lasting for 10 days during the period of September – October. The other one is Karthika deepam festival of one day. The Thrikovil Ambalam is dedicated to Narasimha Moorthy (god with the head of a lion and body of a man) one of the incarnations of Lord Maha Vishnu. This temple's pond (tank) known as the Thrikkai Kulam (sacred palm pond) is about two acres in area. The legend is that this tank was made by the pressing of the palm of Sage (maharishi) Agasthyan or Ashtavakran.

== Demographics ==
Arangottukara is a village in the Talappilly taluka of Thrissur district with an area of 329 hectares and harbouring 682 households with total population of 3013 as per the 2011 Census. The nearest town Shoranur is at a distance of 11 km. Male population is 1447 and female population is 1566. Scheduled Caste Population is 610 and Scheduled Tribes population is 1. Census Location Code of the village is 627717.

== Education ==
- Total literate population: 2486 (82.51%)
- Literate male population: 1213 (83.83%)
- Literate female population: 1273 (81.29%)

The nearest Upper Primary School (in Ezhumangad portion) is in the village. The nearest Secondary School (Desamangalam) is at a distance of 5 to 10 km from the village.

== Land Use ==
Arangottukara exhibits the following land use pattern (area in hectares):

- Area under Non-agricultural Uses: 15
- Barren and Un-cultivable land: 5
- Culturable Waste Land: 41.91
- Current Fallows: 9
- Net Area Sown: 258.09
- Total Un-irrigated Land Area: 133.5
- Area irrigated by source: 133.59

== Places of worship ==
- Mullakkal Devi Temple
- Karthyayani Temple
- Veethuttoor Hanuman Temple
- Eratticharth Mahadeva Temple
- Thrikkovil Narasimha moorthy temple
- Mariyamman Temple
- Bhuvaneswari Devi Temple
- Mattumnjalil Lord Siva Temple
- Arangottukara Juma Masjid Masjid
- Kodaloorkavu Ayyappa Temple
