= Prabhu Lal Bhatnagar =

Indian mathematician (1912–1976)

- Born: 8 August 1912; Kota, India
- Died: 5 October 1976 (aged 64); Allahabad, India
- Education: Allahabad University; Agra University
- Known for: Bhatnagar–Gross–Krook operator
- Awards: Padma Bhushan in 1968
- Scientific career
- Fields: Mathematician
- Workplaces: University of Delhi; Indian Institute of Science; Harvard University; Himachal Pradesh University; Smithsonian Astrophysical Observatory
- Doctoral advisor: Amiya Charan Banerjee
- Doctoral students: Phoolan Prasad

Prabhu Lal Bhatnagar (8 August 1912 – 5 October 1976), commonly addressed as P. L. Bhatnagar, was an Indian mathematician known for his contribution to the Bhatnagar–Gross–Krook operator used in Lattice Boltzmann methods (LBM).

== Early years and career ==
He was born in Kota in Rajasthan and was the second of five sons. He did his schooling in Rampura and later at Herberter College in Kota. After schooling, he went to Maharajah's College in Jaipur, where in 1935 he completed BSc with first rank, followed by MSc.

His research career started at the Allahabad University under the supervision of Prof. B. N. Prasad on summability theory but soon he joined Prof. Amiya Charan Banerjee to work in differential equations. The results of his work (with Prof. Banerji, published in Proceeding of National Academy of Sciences, 1938) are included in the book of Erich Kamke. He became interested in the area of astrophysics after coming in contact with Meghnad Saha. In 1939 he obtained DPhil degree in mathematics for his thesis titled On the Origin of the Solar System.

In 1939 he joined St. Stephen's College, Delhi on the invitation of S. N. Mukherjee and spent the next 16 years there. There he worked on the theory of white dwarfs, independently and together with Daulat Singh Kothari.

In 1952, he was invited to Harvard University as a Fulbright scholar. There he worked together with Donald Howard Menzel and Hari Kesab Singh in the field of non-linear gases. His work with the Boltzmann equation led to his well-known BGK collision model in 1954 together with Eugene P. Gross and Max Krook. It was at first extensively developed for ionized gases with many applications. These days, the BGK collision operator is essential for the recent development of lattice Boltzmann automata methods.

In 1950 he was elected fellow of Indian National Science Academy and in 1955 the fellow of Indian Academy of Sciences. In 1956 he was invited to join Indian Institute of Science as the founding Professor of the Department of Applied Mathematics. There he expanded his research area into the field of non-Newtonian fluid mechanics. Alongside to his research work he also laid down the foundation stone of the Indian National Mathematics Olympiad. For his contributions to the nation, on 26 January 1968 he was awarded the Padma Bhushan.

During the early 1960s he developed complications in the lower spinal region and was operated on in the United States. In 1969 he moved to Rajasthan University in Jaipur as Vice-Chancellor and in 1971 joined Himachal Pradesh University in Shimla as Head of the Mathematics Department. He was also member of the Union Public Service Commission and the first Director of the Mehta Research Institute (now renamed as the Harish-Chandra Research Institute).

== Honors and awards ==
He was awarded the Padma Bhushan by the President of India on 26 January 1968. After he died on 5 October 1976 at Allahabad, the Illustrated Weekly of India paid a tribute to him through an article on him by the well-known science writer Jagajit Singh.

== Later years ==
His wife died in January 1973. He moved to Delhi in October as member of the Union Public Service Commission. In 1975 he accepted the post of Director of the newly created Mehta Research Institute in Allahabad. He died of a heart attack on 5 October 1976.
