= Max Krook =

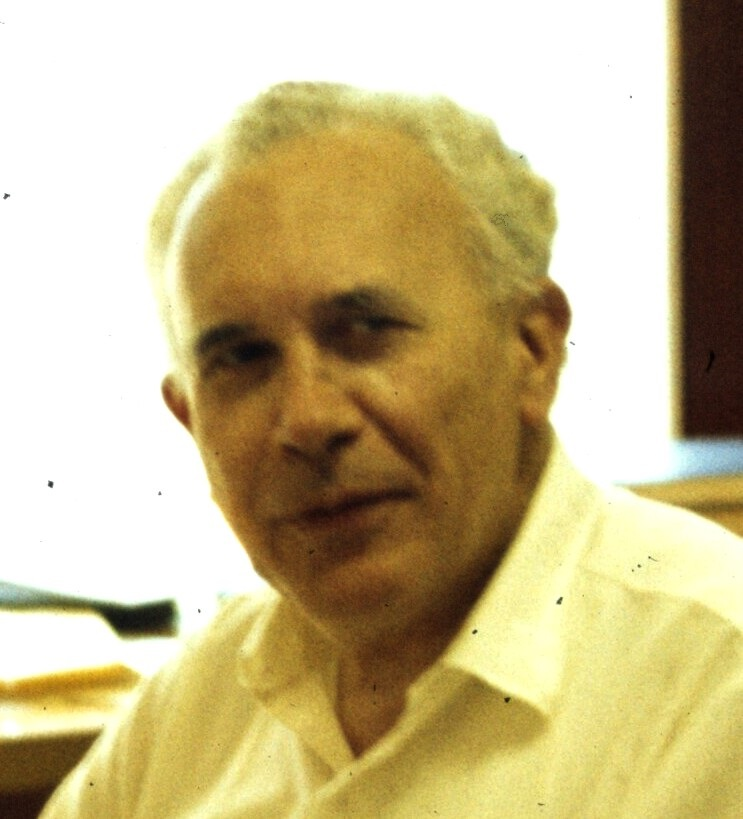
Max Krook (1972)

Max Krook (1913 – 4 August 1985) was an American mathematician and astrophysicist.

Krook was born in Standerton, South Africa, the son of Pesach Israel Krook and Leah Krook. An undergraduate at the University of the Witwatersrand, Krook received a doctorate in mathematics from Cambridge University in England in 1938 under the supervision of Arthur Eddington. He was subsequently recruited to Birmingham University by Rudolf Peierls.

Krook came to the United States in 1950 as a research associate in physics at the Indiana University, soon moving to the Smithsonian Astrophysical Observatory in Cambridge, Massachusetts. He was additionally appointed a research fellow at the Harvard College Observatory in 1952. In 1956, he became a lecturer in astronomy, and, in 1959, a professor in the Harvard's Division of Applied Sciences and the department of astronomy. Robert May (later, Baron May of Oxford) was one of his first postdoctoral students. Krook was for decades a regular at Cambridge's Legal Sea Foods restaurant, where a particular table was often held for him at lunchtime.

Krook married Gulielma Penn-Gaskel White, 1952 graduate of Radcliffe College, and later successful photographer, in 1956. Although ultimately divorced, they continued to share a residence in Arlington, Massachusetts until the time of his death.

Krook is remembered for his contribution to the Bhatnagar-Gross-Krook model.

== Selected works ==
- Functions of a Complex Variable: Theory and Technique, by George F. Carrier, Max Krook, and Carl E. Pearson, SIAM, 2005, ISBN 0-89871-595-4 (first edition: McGraw-Hill, 1966, ISBN 0-07-010089-6).
- Bhatnagar, P. L.; Gross, E. P.; Krook, M. (1954-05-01). "A Model for Collision Processes in Gases. I. Small Amplitude Processes in Charged and Neutral One-Component Systems". Physical Review. 94 (3). American Physical Society (APS): 511–525. Bibcode:1954PhRv...94..511B. doi:10.1103/physrev.94.511. ISSN 0031-899X.
