= Franco-British Nuclear Forum =

Intergovernmental forum

The first meeting of the Franco–British Nuclear Forum was held in Paris in November 2007, chaired by the Minister for Energy and the French Industry Minister. The working groups are focusing on specific areas for collaboration. A follow-up meeting on the issue in London was planned for March 2008, but did not take place.

== See also ==
- Nuclear power in the United Kingdom
- Nuclear power in France
