= Emilio Gatti =

Italian engineer (1922–2016)

Emilio Gatti (18 March 1922 – 9 July 2016) was an Italian engineer. He was a professor of nuclear electronics at the Polytechnic University of Milan. With Pavel Rehak he invented the silicon drift detector in 1983; he later patented it.

== Life ==
Gatti was born in Turin on 18 March 1922. In 1946 he graduated in electrical engineering at the University of Padua, and in 1947 did post-graduate work in electronics. From 1948, he worked at the Centro Informazioni Studi ed Esperienze in Milan, where in 1950, he became head of the electronics division. From 1951 he taught at the Politecnico di Milano, and from 1957 to 1997 was a professore ordinario there. In 1998, he was appointed emeritus professor.

== Societies ==
From 1961 to 1993, he was director of the scientific journal Alta Frequenza of the Italian Electrotechnics and Electronics Association (AEI). From 1964 to 1967, he was President of the Italian Section of the Institute of Electrical and Electronics Engineers (IEEE).

Member (1971–1995) and President (1983–1995) of the Scientific Council of Tecnomare (Venice).

From 1979 to 1981, he was President of the National Circuits and Components Group (CCTE) of the National Research Council (CNR).

From 1983 to 1985, he was President of the Milan Section. From 1992 to 1994 he was the general Vice-president of Italian Electrotechnics and Electronics Association (AEI), as well as meritorious partner since 1987.

From 1970 to 1992, he was a member and, from 1978 to 1981, Director of the Scientific Council of LAMEL (Materials for Electronics Lab) of the National Research Council (CNR), based in Bologna.

From 1973, he was annually invited to spend the month of October at the Brookhaven National Laboratory (Upton, New York, US) to conduct studies and research at the Instrumentation Division headed by Veliko Radeka.

From 1969, he was a corresponding partner, from 1980 a regular member, from 2000 to 2002 Vice-president and from 2003 to 2005 President of Istituto Lombardo Accademia di Scienze e Lettere (Lombard Institute Academy of Sciences and Arts).

He was a member since 1981 of the National Academy of Sciences, also called Accademia Nazionale dei XL.

Since 1988, he has been a corresponding partner and, since 2003, a national partner of the Accademia Nazionale dei Lincei (Lincei National Academy).

Since 1989, he has been an honorary member of the College of Engineers of Milan.

From 1996 to 2001, he was a member of the Governing Council of Centro Linceo.

== Research ==
Emilio Gatti’s main field of research was that of measurements and electronic instrumentation for Physics, especially that of radiation and elementary particle detectors and that of electronic instrumentation for energy, time and position spectrometry. In 1953, he introduced the added step method to obtain high precision, single-channel discriminators.

In 1955, he suggested replacing the traditional configuration of the voltage amplifier with a new configuration, eventually called the charge preamplifier, as the first stage in processing the signals of Ionization chambers. The charge preamplifier later became of general use and is currently the amplification stage most widely resorted to for semiconductor radiation detectors.

In 1956, he introduced the Vernier method to improve the temporal localisation of events. He formulated the statistical theory of the scintillation counter and the synthesis of optimal filters for the temporal localisation of events detected by the scintillation counters. In the field of radiation detectors, he identified the correct method of calculating the charge induced to the electrodes in solid-state detectors, correcting a widespread error in the literature.

In 1961, he invented the streamer chamber.

In 1963, he invented the sliding scale method to obtain high differential linearity in the multi-channel amplitude analyzers used in radiation and particle spectroscopy. The method gave rise to scientific developments and to implementations throughout the world and is currently used in high differential linearity analog-to-digital converters (ADC). In 1997, the scientific mission for the NASA Pathfinder Mars exploration employed the Sojourner (rover) on which a spectrometer Alpha particle X-ray spectrometer (APXS) – used to analyse the composition of the soil – is installed, in whose electronics the sliding scale method, called “The Gatti correction”, is implemented to arrive at the required high linearity.

Research undertaken throughout his career led to the theoretical synthesis of the optimal filters for processing the signals of nuclear detectors to measure energy and time under various constraint conditions. These studies contributed to the development of modern digital pulse processors of the radiation detectors currently used in multiple scientific experiments.

The experience in the field of nuclear instrumentation led Gatti to contribute to biomedical electronic instrumentation, especially with instruments to detect the potential maps on the chest arising from the electric activity of the heart (1972) and with the first instrument for detecting the speed profiles of blood in the vessels, based on the pulsed Doppler ultrasonography (1980).

In 1983 Emilio Gatti, together with Pavel Rehak, researcher from the Brookhaven National Laboratory (USA), invented the Silicon Drift Detector, which represents nowadays one of the semiconductor detectors with the highest energy resolution for X-ray spectroscopy. In the following years, thanks to Emilio Gatti, a close research collaboration was established between Politecnico di Milano, the Brookhaven National Laboratory (where many of his students are invited to spend a period as researchers) and Munich’s Max Planck Institute for Extraterrestrial Physics, to conduct an intense research and development on the SDD detectors and on the associated electronics; these researches, under Gatti’s guidance, result in several innovations and implementations. In 2004, two twin rovers, Spirit and Opportunity, landed on planet Mars, using in the Alpha particle X-ray spectrometer a Silicon Drift Detector for the X-ray analysis of the soil and the rocks. In 2014, the space probe of the European Space Agency’s Rosetta mission launched in 2004 reached the comet 67P/Churyumov-Gerasimenko, and its lander Philae, which includes among its instruments an APXS fitted with a SDD detector, landed on the comet to analyse the nucleus. At Geneva’s CERN's ALICE experiment has been operational since 2008 on the Large Hadron Collider for the study of interactions between heavy ions: it employs a large particle detection system that includes 260 Silicon Drift Detectors.

Solid-state Drift Detectors are nowadays used in several applications, both scientific and industrial, throughout the world.

== Awards and honours ==
The IEEE Emilio Gatti Radiation Instrumentation Technical Achievement Award, was created to celebrate the work of Gatti.

- In 1953, he received the Bianchi award from the Italian Electrical Association.
- In 1968, he received the national award from the Fondazione Angelo della Riccia per la Fisica (Angelo della Riccia Foundation for Physics).
- In 1971, he received the Righi award from the Italian Electrical and Electronics Association (AEI).
- In 1972, he was decorated by the President of the Republic with the Golden medal to the deserving protagonists of school, culture and art.
- In 1973, he was elected Fellow of the Institute of Electrical and Electronics Engineers (IEEE)
- In 1982, he received the “Pubblicazioni” (“Publications”) award from the Italian Electrical and Electronics Association (AEI).
- In 1984, he received the IEEE Centennial Medal from the Institute of Electrical and Electronics Engineers (IEEE).
- In 1986, he was awarded the Feltrinelli Prize for physical sciences by the Accademia dei Lincei
- In 1988, he received from the Nuclear & Plasma Sciences Society the “Annual Merit Award” for his contributions to the theory and development of nuclear particle detectors and the methods for processing the related signals.
- In 1995, he was awarded the Honorary Degree (Laurea honoris causa) in Physics by the University of Milan.
- In 1996, he received the International Gerolamo Cardano Award from the Rotary Club of Pavia and the University of Pavia.
- In 2003, he received the “IEEE Radiation Instrumentation Outstanding Achievement Award” from the IEEE Nuclear & Plasma Sciences Society.
- In 2012, the journal IEEE Solid-State Circuits Magazine dedicated a special issue to him on his ninetieth birthday.
- On 6 July 2017, the Conference Hall of the Department of Electronics, Information and Bioengineering of Politecnico di Milano was named after him

== Works ==
Emilio Gatti authored the following books:

- E. Gatti, P. F. Manfredi, A. Rimini, “Elementi di teoria delle reti lineari” Casa Editrice Ambrosiana 1966.
- F. Carassa, E. Gatti, “Elettronica” in Enciclopedia del 900, Treccani, 1977.
- S. Bobbio, E. Gatti, “Elementi di Elettromagnetismo”, Ed. Boringhieri, 1984.
- S. Bobbio, E. Gatti, “Elettromagnetismo. Ottica”, Ed. Bollati Boringhieri, 1991.

These are his most cited papers:

- Gatti, Emilio; Rehak, Pavel (September 1984). "Semiconductor drift chamber — An application of a novel charge transport scheme". Nuclear Instruments and Methods in Physics Research. 225 (3): 608–614. Bibcode:1984NIMPR.225..608G. doi:10.1016/0167-5087(84)90113-3. S2CID 124188498.
- Gatti, E.; Manfredi, P. F. (26 January 2008). "Processing the signals from solid-state detectors in elementary-particle physics". Rivista del Nuovo Cimento. 9 (1): 1–146. doi:10.1007/BF02822156. S2CID 119894281.
- Lechner, Peter; Eckbauer, Stefan; Hartmann, Robert; Krisch, Susanne; Hauff, Dieter; Richter, Rainer; Soltau, Heike; Strüder, Lothar; Fiorini, Carlo; Gatti, Emilio; Longoni, Antonio; Sampietro, Marco (August 1996). "Silicon drift detectors for high resolution room temperature X-ray spectroscopy". Nuclear Instruments and Methods in Physics Research Section A: Accelerators, Spectrometers, Detectors and Associated Equipment. 377 (2–3): 346–351. Bibcode:1996NIMPA.377..346L. doi:10.1016/0168-9002(96)00210-0.
- Gatti, E.; Manfredi, P.F.; Sampietro, M.; Speziali, V. (December 1990). "Suboptimal filtering of 1/ƒ-noise in detector charge measurements". Nuclear Instruments and Methods in Physics Research Section A: Accelerators, Spectrometers, Detectors and Associated Equipment. 297 (3): 467–478. Bibcode:1990NIMPA.297..467G. doi:10.1016/0168-9002(90)91331-5.
