= Ruggero Ceppellini =

Italian geneticist (1917–1988)

Ruggero Ceppellini (1917 in Milan – 1988) was a leading Italian geneticist. Ceppellini made several important contributions in the field of immunogenetics, and understanding of the human leukocyte antigen (HLA).

During service as a sergeant in World War II, Ceppellini was captured by the British and as a prisoner of war in Palestine, was a medical orderly under Chaim Sheba. After the war he finished his medical training and decided to specialize in genetics; Luca Cavalli-Sforza influenced his decision and obtained a place for him at the University of Milan Istituto Sieroterapico Milanese.

Ceppellini trained at the Lister Institute in London, then was visiting investigator at the Columbia University Institute for the Study of Human Variation. After returning to Italy in the late 1950s, in 1962 he became Professor of Medical Genetics at the University of Turin, where he founded the Institute of Medical Genetics and began his work on HLA.
