= Rishabh Shukla =

Indian television actor

- Occupations: Actor, Dubbing Artist
- Years active: 1980–2017

Rishabh Shukla (R̥ṣabha Śuklā) is an Indian film and television actor and a voice-dubbing artist, who speaks Hindi as his mother tongue language. On television he is most known for his role of Maharaj Shantanu in Mahabharat (TV series) (1988–1990)

== Filmography ==
=== Films ===
Year	Film	Role	Notes
1986	Amrit	Virendra Srivastav	
1987	Watan Ke Rakhwale	John Fernandes, seen only in photo frame (Cameo Role)	
1990	Aaj Ka Arjun	Ajit Singh	
1991	Jeene Ki Sazaa	Abhijeet	
1992	Ishq Khuda Hain		
1994	Mohabbat Ki Arzoo	Dr. Amar	
2000	Chehron Ke Pichhe		
2007	Qatalgaah	Vinod Bhandari	
2013	Mahabharat Aur Barbareek	Bhagwan Shiva	

== Television ==
Year	Serial	Role	Channel	Notes
1980	Rishte Naate			
1981–1982	Apradhi Kaun			produced by Vinay Dhumale
	Anupama	paired opposite Shabana Azmi		produced by Himesh Reshammiya
	Bada Aadmi			produced by B. R. Chopra
	Indian			produced by Adhikari Brothers
	Rahasya			
1985	Trishna		DD National	produced by Doordarshan Mumbai
1986	Bahadur Shah Zafar	Jahangir	DD National	produced by B. R. Chopra
1987	Chunni	Gautam Khanna	DD National	produced by B. R. Chopra
1988	Mahabharat	Maharaj Shantanu	DD National	produced by B. R. Chopra
1990-1991	The Sword of Tipu Sultan		DD National	
1991-1992	Majdhaar			directed by Naveen Kumar
1992	Sauda		DD National	produced by B. R. Chopra
1993	Commander		Zee TV	produced by Adhikari Brothers
	Yehi To Pyaar Hai		Zee TV	
1993	Tiger	Tiger	DD Metro	
1993	Kanoon (Episode: Accident)	Mr. Mathur	DD Metro	produced by B. R. Chopra
1994-1995	The Great Maratha	Shah Alam II	DD National	
1994-1998	Daraar		Zee TV	
1995-1996	Marshall		DD National	produced by Adhikari Brothers
1995	Andaz		Zee TV	produced by Himesh Reshamiya
1995	Zee Horror Show (Episode: Siskiyan)		Zee TV	
1997	Jai Hanuman	Manu Maharaj (Guest Role Episode No 8)	DD National	produced by Sanjay Khan
1997-1998	Mahabharat Katha	Krishna	DD National	produced by B. R. Chopra
1997-1998	Chattaan	Suraj Khanna	Zee TV	
1997-1998	Khamoshi			produced by Adhikari Brothers
1998-1999	Jaan	Aadesh	Zee TV	
1999	Ahsaas		DD Metro	
2000-2001	Dushman		DD National	produced by B. R. Chopra
2001	Vishnu Puran	Maharaj Dasharatha	DD National	produced by B. R. Chopra
2002	1857 Kranti	Mirza Ghalib	DD National	
2002-2003	Maa Shakti	Bhagwan Vishnu / Shankhchurn	Star Plus	produced by B. R. Chopra
	Joshiley	Episode 4 & Episode 5	DD National	produced by B. R. Chopra
2007	Risshton Ki Dor	Veerendrapratap Singh Rajput	Sony Entertainment Television	
2010–2011	Baat Hamari Pakki Hai	Pratap Jaiswal	Sony Entertainment Television	
2012–2013	Ramayan	Maharaj Dasharatha	Zee TV	
2013	Savdhaan India	Kishore (Episode 279)	Life OK	
2014	Adaalat – Antariksh Mein Hatya	Siddhant Gurjar (Episode 308)	Sony Entertainment Television	
2016	Brahmarakshas	Aditya Nigam	Zee TV	
2017	Piyaa Albela	Guruji	Zee TV	
2025	Manpasand Ki Shaadi	Ghanshyam	Colors TV	

=== Television advertisement ===
- Known for popular 80's ad Krackjack advertisement worked with Neerja Bhanot.

== Dubbing career ==
He has been dubbing foreign films especially Hollywood films in Hindi, since 1982, when he moved to Mumbai.

== Dubbing roles ==
=== Animated films ===
Film title	Character	Dub Language	Original Language	Original Year Release	Dub Year Release
Ramayana: The Epic	Lakshmana	Hindi	Hindi	2010	

=== Live action films ===
- All dubs in Hindi unless otherwise noted.

==== Hollywood films ====
Film title	Actor	Character	Original Year Release	Dub Year Release
Jesus	Brian Deacon	Jesus	1979	
Harry Potter and the Goblet of Fire	Ralph Fiennes	Lord Voldemort	2005	
Harry Potter and the Order of the Phoenix	Ralph Fiennes	Lord Voldemort	2007	
Harry Potter and the Deathly Hallows – Part 1	Ralph Fiennes	Lord Voldemort	2010	
Harry Potter and the Deathly Hallows – Part 2	Ralph Fiennes	Lord Voldemort	2011	
Man Of Steel	Kevin Costner	Jonathan Kent	2013	
Guardians of the Galaxy	John C. Reilly	Rhomann Dey	2014	
Exodus: Gods and Kings	Christian Bale	Moses	2014	
Batman v Superman: Dawn of Justice	Jeremy Irons	Alfred Pennyworth	2016	
Now You See Me 2	Woody Harrelson	Merritt McKinney/Chase McKinney	2016	
Justice League	Jeremy Irons	Alfred Pennyworth	2017	
Aquaman	Temuera Morrison	Thomas Curry	2018	
Tenet	Michael Caine	Sir Michael Crosby	2020	
The Batman	Andy Serkis	Alfred Pennyworth	2022	

==== Indian films ====
Film title	Actor	Character	Original Language	Original Year Release	Dub Year Release	Notes
War	Sanjeev Vatsa	Rizwan Iliyasi	Hindi	2019		Voice-over
Don	Nagarjuna	Suri (Surya in Hindi version)	Telugu	2007	2008	The Hindi dub was titled: Don No. 1.
Kempe Gowda	Sudeep	Kempe Gowda (Bajirao in Hindi version)	Kannada	2011	2012	The Hindi dub was titled: Bajirao The Fighter.
Rajanna	Nagarjuna	Rajanna (extended cameo)	Telugu	2011	2012	The Hindi dub was titled: Hindustani Yodha.
Damarukam	Nagarjuna	Mallikarjuna / Malli (Balagangadhar / Bala in Hindi version)	Telugu	2012	2013	The Hindi dub was titled: Shiva The Super Hero 2.
Jilla	Mohanlal	Gangster Sivan	Tamil	2014		The Hindi dub was titled: Policewala Gunda 2.
Ala Vaikunthapurramuloo	Jayaram	Ramachandra	Telugu	2020	2022	
Chandramukhi	Prabhu Ganesan	Senthilnathan (Sumit in Hindustani version)	Tamil	2005	2022	Dubbed in Hindustani
Yamadonga	Sr. N. T. R. †	Himself (archive footage)	Telugu	2007	2022	Dubbed in Awadhi. Was titled: Chor Raja.
Yashoda	Sampath Raj	Vasudeva IPS	Telugu	2022		

== See also ==
- Dubbing (filmmaking)
- List of Indian dubbing artists
