= Bob Christo =

Australian–Indian civil engineer, actor (1938–2011)

- Born: Robert John Christo; 1938; Sydney, Australia
- Died: 20 March 2011 (aged 72–73); Bangalore, Karnataka, India
- Occupations: Civil engineer; actor
- Years active: 1980–2003

Robert John Christo was an Australian–Indian civil engineer and actor in Hindi films. Starting with Sanjay Khan's Abdullah (1980), he went on to act in over 200 Hindi films in the 1980s and 1990s, including Qurbani (1980), Kaalia (1981), Nastik (1983), Mard (1985), Mr India (1987), Roop Ki Rani Choron Ka Raja (1993) and Gumraah (1993), mostly playing roles as a non-Indian henchman or Army General.

== Career ==
Born in Sydney, Christo was a qualified civil engineer of paternal Greek and maternal German descent. He had two brothers, Helmut and Mike. Despite his Australian nationality, Christo spent much of his youth in West Germany qualifying as an engineer following his return to Australia. Known for his brawny physique and bald-headed look, Bob arrived in Bombay, India in 1978 while awaiting a work permit to Muscat, Oman following several job stints to support his three children including in Vietnam following the death of his first wife in a car accident in 1974. It was in Mumbai that he was introduced to Bollywood actress Parveen Babi, who helped him transition into Hindi films.

He received his first break when he constructed the jungle palace for Francis Ford Coppola in Apocalypse Now. He was noticed as a villain in the Hindi movie Abdullah in 1980. Christo decided to stay in India and appeared in over 200 movies in Hindi, Tamil, Telugu, Malayalam and Kannada, playing a recurring typecast villain. Also after many years, Sanjay Khan gave him a break, firstly in The Sword of Tipu Sultan and then in The Great Maratha, where he played the iconic character of Ahmed Shah Abdali.

During the later stages of his life, he relocated to Bangalore in early 2000, where he started working as a Yoga instructor and remained disconnected from the Hindi movie industry since 2003.

== Death ==
The 72-year-old actor died of "rupture of left ventricle valve" in Bangalore on 20 March 2011. He is survived by his wife Nargis and two sons, Darius and Sunil. He has two daughters, Monique and Nicole from his previous marriage.

== Filmography ==
=== Film ===
List of Bob Christo film credits
Year	Title	Role	Language	Notes
1978	Arvind Desai Ki Ajeeb Dastaan	Roberts	Hindi	
1978	The Wild Geese	Body double	English	Uncredited
1979	Pehredaar		Hindi	
1980	Qurbani		Hindi	
1980	Cobra	Bob Christo	Hindi	
1980	Bebbuli	Bob Christo	Telugu	
1980	Abdullah	Magician	Hindi	
1981	Sankharsham		Malayalam	
1981	Kaalia	Michael	Hindi	
1981	Kalkut		Hindi	
1982	Prohari		Hindi	
1982	Ustadi Ustad Se	Prem's associated	Hindi	
1982	Namak Halaal	Hitman	Hindi	
1982	Ashanti	Sampat's Man	Hindi	
1982	Star	Samson	Hindi	
1982	Disco Dancer	International Hit-man	Hindi	
1982	Main Intequam Loonga	Anthony	Hindi	
1982	Sharaabi Nar		Hindi	
1982	Bobbili Puli		Telugu	
1983	Taqdeer	Gangster	Hindi	
1983	Nastik		Hindi	
1983	Jaani Dost	Cobra's Goon	Hindi	
1983	Naukar Biwi Ka	Rustom	Hindi	
1983	Hum Se Hai Zamana		Hindi	
1983	Haadsa	Abductor	Hindi	
1983	Bekhabar		Hindi	
1984	Boxer		Hindi	
1984	Sharaabi	Ruffian #3	Hindi	Uncredited
1984	Insaaf Kaun Karega	Bob	Hindi	
1984	Raaj Tilak	Combatant in arena	Hindi	
1984	Jagir	Bandit	Hindi	
1984	Kasam Paida Karne Wale Ki	Udaybhan's Assistant	Hindi	
1984	Sharara		Hindi	
1984	Raja Aur Rana	Bob	Hindi	
1984	Sardar	Pavana Murthy's Goon	Telugu	
1985	Karm Yudh		Hindi	
1985	Sarfarosh	British Man	Hindi	
1985	Baadal		Hindi	
1985	Telephone	Bob	Hindi	
1985	Geraftaar	Ram	Hindi	
1985	Mard	Simon	Hindi	
1985	Insaaf Main Karoonga	Commander Bob	Hindi	
1985	Yaar Kasam		Hindi	
1985	Kali Basti	Bob Jackson	Hindi	
1985	Haveli	Runaway prisoner English man	Hindi	
1985	Kaakki Sattai		Tamil	
1985	Jeevante Jeevan	Boxer Bob Christo	Malayalam	
1986	Viduthalai		Tamil	
1986	Badle Ki Jwala		Hindi	
1986	Amma	British Colonel	Hindi	
1986	Prathyekam Sradhikkukka	Christopher	Malayalam	
1986	Kala Dhanda Goray Log	Bob	Hindi	
1986	Sathkaara		Kannada	
1986	Nasihat		Hindi	
1986	Allah Rakha	Don	Hindi	
1986	Avinash	Bob	Hindi	
1986	Palay Khan	British Officer	Hindi	
1986	Chanakya Sapadham	Nero, Diamonds Smuggler	Telugu	
1986	Hello My Dear Wrong Number	Bob	Malayalam	
1987	Kadhal Parisu		Tamil	
1987	Hukumat	DBDN's English Friend	Hindi	
1987	Mr. India	Mr. Wolcott	Hindi	
1987	Hiraasat	Bob	Hindi	
1987	Uttar Dakshin	Bob	Hindi	
1987	Superman	Bob	Hindi	
1987	Jayasimha	Foreign Smuggler	Kannada	
1987	Cooliekkaran		Tamil	
1988	Commando	Marcelloni's Henchman	Hindi	
1988	Bloodstone	Haggerty	English	
1988	Paanch Fauladi	Seth Englishman	Hindi	
1988	Mera Shikar		Hindi	
1988	Mar Mitenge	Bob	Hindi	
1988	Aryan		Malayalam	
1988	Aakhri Adaalat		Hindi	
1989	Ustaad	Bob	Hindi	
1989	Paanch Paapi		Hindi	
1989	Guru	Bandit	Hindi	
1989	Vardi	Himself	Hindi	
1989	Sachché Ká Bol-Bálá	Henchman	Hindi	
1989	Farz Ki Jung	Mr. Barker	Hindi	
1989	Kanoon Ki Awaaz		Hindi	
1989	Dost		Hindi	
1989	Toofan	Goodmark, Gold Smuggler	Hindi	
1989	Lankeshwarudu		Telugu	
1989	Jaadugar	Bob	Hindi	
1989	Siva		Tamil	
1989	Desh Ke Dushman	Inspector Bob	Hindi	
1989	Hongkongnalli Agent Amar		Kannada	
1989	Shehzaade	Bob	Hindi	Uncredited
1989	Apna Desh Praye Log	Swami's Goon	Hindi	
1989	Sachai Ki Taqat		Hindi	
1989	Love Love Love	Bob	Hindi	
1989	Dav Pech	Gambler	Hindi	
1989	Aakhri Muqabla	Tiger / Shola / Shaitan	Hindi	
1989	Gharana	Shiekh, Diamond Merchant	Hindi	
1989	Elaan-E-Jung	Kalanaag Henchman	Hindi	
1989	Meri Garmi		Hindi	
1990	Maut Se Mukabala		Hindi	
1990	Taqdeer Ka Tamasha	Shooter George	Hindi	
1990	Zahreelay	Massena	Hindi	
1990	Agneepath	Gora	Hindi	
1990	Gunahon Ka Devta		Hindi	
1990	Doodh Ka Karz	Engrez Master 'Gora'	Hindi	
1990	Zimmedaaar	Man who beat up the press editor	Hindi	
1990	Maa Kasam Badla Loonga	Bob	Hindi	
1990	Roti Kee Keemat	Bob	Hindi	
1990	Maula Jatt		Punjabi	
1990	Dushman	Sadashiv's aide	Hindi	
1990	Atishbaz	Michael	Hindi	
1990	Athisaya Piravi	Goon	Tamil	Uncredited
1990	Aag Ka Gola	Natwar's Man Baldy	Hindi	
1991	Saugandh	Killer	Hindi	
1991	Vishnu-Devaa	Bald Fighter	Hindi	
1991	Pucca Badmash	Walcott	Hindi	
1991	Yodha	Christo	Hindi	
1991	Farishtay	Terrorist Bob	Hindi	
1991	Numbri Aadmi	Don	Hindi	
1991	Kaun Kare Kurbanie	Goon	Hindi	Uncredited
1991	Jungle Beauty	Jumbo	English	
1991	Fateh		Hindi	
1992	Mr. Bond	Bob	Hindi	
1992	Tahalka	Captain Richard	Hindi	
1992	Humshakal	Rapist	Hindi	
1992	Deedar	Goon	Hindi	
1992	Sone Ki Lanka		Hindi	
1992	Dil Aashna Hai	Goverdhan's man	Hindi	
1992	Tirangaa		Hindi	
1992	Saali Adhe Gharwali	Peter	Hindi	
1993	Roop Ki Rani Choron Ka Raja	Mr. Donze	Hindi	
1993	Phool Aur Angaar	Mr Richard	Hindi	
1993	Gumrah	Male cop in Hong Kong	Hindi	
1993	Hum Hain Kamaal Ke	English Diamond Dealer	Hindi	
1993	Aadmi	John	Hindi	
1993	Tahqiqaat	Goon	Hindi	
1993	Aulad Ke Dushman	Rexon Warner	Hindi	
1993	Aankhen	Tejeshwar's Henchman	Hindi	Uncredited
1994	Kaun Apna Kaun Paraya		Hindi	
1994	Insaaf Apne Lahoo Se	Bob	Hindi	
1994	Pathreela Raasta		Hindi	
1994	Aaja Re O Sajana		Hindi	
1995	Jawab	Sobhraj's goon	Hindi	
1995	Paandav	K.K.'s (Kiran Kumar) henchman	Hindi	
1995	Jai Vikraanta		Hindi	
1995	Prem	British Officer	Hindi	
1995	Sarhad: The Border of Crime		Hindi	
1995	Kismat	Charlie Walcott	Hindi	
1996	Zordaar	John	Hindi	
1996	Ram Aur Shyam		Hindi	
1997	Agnichakra		Hindi	
1997	Gupt: The Hidden Truth	Boat organiser	Hindi	
1997	Dhaal		Hindi	
1998	Kalicharan		Hindi	
1999	Hum Tum Pe Marte Hain		Hindi	
1999	Nyaydaata	B.C.	Hindi	
2001	Kasam	John	Hindi	
2001	Veer Savarkar	William Hutt Curzon Wyllie	Hindi	
2004	Rose Thorn		English	
2016	Aman Ke Farishtey		Hindi	(final film role)

=== Television ===
List of Bob Christo television credits
Year	Title	Role	Language
1990	The Sword of Tipu Sultan	General Matthews	Hindi
1994	The Great Maratha	Ahmed Shah Abdali	Hindi
	The Indian Trunk		French
	La Nouvelle Malle des Indes	Le major aka Wettlauf nach Bombay West Germany	French

== Works ==
- Flashback: My Life and Times in Bollywood and Beyond, by Bob Christo. Penguin India, 2011. ISBN 0143414623.

== See also ==
- List of Indian film actors
