= Bhushan Tiwari =

Indian actor

Bhushan Tiwari or Chandrabhushan Tiwari (12 February 1935 - 3 October 1994) was an Indian character actor in Hindi films, who largely played negative roles in many Bollywood movies. e.g. of a villain's henchman in films, like Zanjeer (1973) and Parvarish (1977). His father was Ramayan Tiwari who also played mainly villains. He also played the role of Manilal in the TV mini-series, The Far Pavilions (1984)

== Filmography ==
Year	Film	Character/Role
1968	Neel Kamal	
1971	Mela	Sajjau
1971	Balidaan	
1972	Apradh	
1972	Raja Jani	as Zaalim Singh
1972	Raampur Ka Lakshman	as Bhushan
1972	Samadhi	as Dacoit (uncredited)
1973	Yaadon Ki Baaraat	as Shakaal's Man (as Bhooshan Tiwari)
1973	Loafer	as Bhushan
1973	Banarasi Babu	Sohan's abductor
1973	Zanjeer	Smuggler - Teja's man (as Bhooshan Tiwari)
1974	Kunwara Baap	Kalu Dada
1975	Rafoo Chakkar	Police Informer
1975	Pratiggya	as Daku
1976	Nehle Pe Dehla	
1976	Naach Uthe Sansaar	as Vaidraj Mehto
1976	Ginny Aur Johnny	
1976	Sikka	
1976	Sabse Bada Rupaiya	as Badrath Singh
1977	Chakkar Pe Chakkar	as Bhushan
1977	Dhoop Chhaon	as Bhushan (as Bhooshan Tiwari)
1977	Hum Kisise Kum Naheen	as Bhushan (as Bhooshan Tiwari)
1977	Parvarish	as Mangal's henchman
1979	Shabhash Daddy	
1980	Yari Dushmani	
1981	Fiffty Fiffty	Man who hit Mary with his car (uncredited)
1981	Aapas Ki Baat	Kaalia
1982	Badle Ki Aag	Mohanlal's man (uncredited)
1982	Swami Dada	
1983	Bade Dil Wala	as Shambhu
1983	Sweekar Kiya Maine	Drunk who molests Lajjo and Gopika
1984	Aaj Ka M.L.A. Ram Avtar	
1984	Sharaabi	Mr Gore
1984	Haisiyat	
1985	Kali Basti	as Tony Dada
1985	Hum Dono	as Girdhari
1985	Ramkali	as Bhushan Singh
1985	Balidaan	Police Inspector
1985	Wafadaar	Senior Villager
1985	Sur Sangam	
1986	Kala Dhanda Goray Log	Utak Singh
1986	Zindagani	Natwar's assistant (as Bhooshan Tiwari)
1986	Tahkhana	as Mangal
1987	Woh Din Aayega	Somnath's henchman
1987	Loha	Shera's Man in prison
1987	Satyamev Jayate	Superintendent
1988	Gangaa Jamunaa Saraswathi	Jagga (uncredited)
1988	Veerana	Villager
1989	Purani Haveli	Dhambar Singh
1989	Daata	Jango as G.D.'s employee
1989	Toofan	
1989	Elaan-E-Jung	KalaNaag Henchman
1989	Lashkar	Netaji (uncredited)
1990	Zimmedaaar	as Goga
1991	Ajooba Kudrat Ka	
1991	Farishtay	Bhushan
1992	Tahalka	Dong's armyman
1992	Dil Aashna Hai	Laila's Customer visiting Brothel
1993	Phool Aur Angaar	as Chiranjilal Verma
1995	Fauji	(as Tiwari)
1995	Paandav	
1997	Loha	(as Tiwari)
1998	Tamanna	(as Tiwari)

== Television ==
Year	Show	Character/Role
1984	The Far Pavilions	(TV mini-series) as Manilal
