= Baadal (1985 film) =

1985 Hindi-language Indian Film

- Poster
- Directed by: Anand Sagar
- Written by: Madan Joshi -dialogues Gulshan Nanda – screenplay Moti Sagar-story
- Produced by: Moti Sagar
- Starring: Shammi Kapoor; Mithun Chakraborty; Poonam Dhillon; Arun Govil; Bob Christo; Shakti Kapoor
- Cinematography: Baba Azmi
- Music by: Bappi Lahiri lyrics by Anjan Indivar
- Release date: 13 December 1985 (India)
- Running time: 130 min.
- Language: Hindi
- Budget: Rs 3.5 Crores

Baadal (transl. Cloud) is a 1985 Indian Hindi-language drama film directed by Anand Sagar, edited by Subhash Sehgal, and stars Shammi Kapoor, Mithun Chakraborty, Poonam Dhillon, Arun Govil, Bob Christo and Shakti Kapoor.

== Plot ==
Thakur Kiran Singh (Arun Govil) is the nephew of Thakur Shamsher Singh (Shammi Kapoor). Thakur Kiran Singh's father was killed by Baadal's (Mithun Chakraborty) father who is also dead, over a piece of land on which Baadal's family lives and refuses to sell. Thakur Kiran Singh and Baadal constantly threaten and provoke each other. Thakur Kiran Singh's cousin Meenakshi, (Poonam Dhillon) daughter of Thakur Shamsher Singh meets Baadal in a bus hijacking on her way home from college. Baadal saves her from dacoits and Meenakshi becomes friends with him. When Thakur Kiran Singh goes to collect her she becomes curious about Kiran's cold behaviour towards Baadal. When Meenakshi mentions this to Thakur Shamsher Singh he tells her Kiran is right, which leaves more questions. Kamini Singh (Madhu Kapoor), who is Kiran's wife and Meenakshi's sister-in-law tells her that Baadal's father is responsible for the death of Kiran's father. Meenakshi believes this enmity should end with the death of both fathers and continues to meet Baadal secretly and falls in love. When Kiran finds out he is enraged and gets into a fight with Baadal and is almost killed by Baadal swinging an axe at him. Meenakshi jumps in front of him and begs Baadal to spare his life for her sake. Baadal threatens that he only spared Kiran because of Meenakshi and next time he will kill him. Kamini's brother Vikram Singh (Shakti Kapoor) comes to visit and has witnessed Baadal and Meenakshi together and tells Kamini everything and suggests he marry Meenakshi to stop this. Kamini asks Kiran who agrees and speaks to Thakur Shamsher Singh about the marriage. Soon they start planning the wedding but Baadal turns up and professes his love for Meenakshi. Enraged Meenakshi's family have him beaten up. Meenakshi goes to his home to help dress his wounds and apologizes for her family. Kiran accuses Shamsher Singh of loving his daughter so much that he has put her happiness above his aim to revenge his brother's death. Shamsher Singh realizes he must not allow Meenakshi to see Baadal. Meenakshi goes to the mandir and tells Baadal they cannot be together as their families will never allow it. Baadal puts sindoor in her hair and says that they are now married. On raksha bandhan Kiran asks Meenakshi what she wants as a gift. Meenakshi says she wants him to protect her husband and that he must choose between his revenge for his father's death and his love for his sister. Kiran leaves the house to speak with Baadal. Kamini goes to Vikram to tie a rakhi and tells him that Kiran has gone to compromise with Baadal. Vikram says he cannot let this happen as it will ruin his plans to grab all of Thakur Shamsher Singh's wealth. Kiran realises Baadal loves Meenakshi and is not using her as he thought before. Kiran hugs Baadal and accepts him as Meenakshi's husband. Vikram who has been watching secretly fires a gunshot to kill Baadal. Kiran sees and throws himself in the way and gets shot. Vikram runs away while Baadal tries to chase him to see who it is. When he sees Kiran dying he holds him in his arms. Kiran asks Baadal to tell Meenakshi he is sorry he could not be at their wedding. Vikram goes to meet Kiran's family asking where he is as Kiran has invited him home for dinner. Baadal carries Kiran's body back to his family where all of them including Meenakshi hold him responsible for Kiran's death. The police take charge and Baadal is sentenced to life imprisonment. As he is talking to Shamsher Singh, he recognizes Vikram's shoes as the killer's shoes and reveals the truth. Baadal is sent to jail as nobody believes him and he escapes to confront Vikram. He arrives in time to save Vikram's maid from being killed by him and she runs to tell Shamsher Singh to stop the wedding. They all arrive at Vikram's house to find it on fire with both men fighting inside. Vikram walks out towards Meenakshi and drops to the floor revealing an arrow on his back. Baadal comes out and hugs Meenakshi. Shamsher Singh apologizes to Baadal for misunderstanding him and accepts him as Meenakshi's husband.

== Soundtrack ==
Lyrics: Anjaan

#	Song	Singer
1	"Hari Hari Bagiya"	Kishore Kumar
2	"Laila Meri Laila"	Bappi Lahiri
3	"Go Go Go Gori"	Bappi Lahiri
4	"Mere Jaisi Mehbooba"	Sharon Prabhakar, Bappi Lahiri
5	"Toota Na Dil Ka Vaada" (Duet)	S. P. Balasubrahmanyam, S. Janaki
6	"Toota Na Dil Ka Vaada" (Solo)	S. P. Balasubrahmanyam

== Cast ==
- Shammi Kapoor as Thakur Shamsher Singh
- Mithun Chakraborty as Badal
- Poonam Dhillon as Meenakshi
- Arun Govil as Thakur Kiran Singh
- Shakti Kapoor as Vikram Singh
- Madan Puri as Thakur Raghuvir Singh
- Ashalata Wabgaonkar as Badal's Mother
- Madhu Kapoor as Kamini
- Jayshree T. as Kasturi
- Rajendra Nath as Sharbati
- Prema Narayan as Champa
