= Trimurti (disambiguation) =

Trimurti is the trinity (Brahma, Vishnu and Shiva) of supreme divinity in Hinduism.

Trimurti may also refer to these in Indian cinema:

- Trimurti (1974 film)
- Thrimurthy, a 1975 Indian film
- Trimurti (1995 film)
- Trimurtulu, a 1987 Indian film
- Trimurti Films, an Indian film production house

== See also ==
- S. K. Trimurti (1912–2008), Indonesian politician
- Trinity (disambiguation)
