= Farishtay =

1991 Indian film by Anil Sharma

- Film poster
- Directed by: Anil Sharma
- Written by: Shadb Kumar; Anil Sharma
- Produced by: Sattee Shourie; Mona Kapoor
- Starring: Dharmendra; Vinod Khanna; Rajnikanth; Jaya Prada; Sridevi; Swapna; Sadashiv Amrapurkar; Kulbhushan Kharbanda
- Cinematography: Anil Dhanda
- Edited by: A. R. Rajendran
- Music by: Songs: Bappi Lahiri; Score: Raamlaxman
- Distributed by: S. G. S. Films
- Release date: 22 February 1991
- Running time: 197 minutes
- Country: India
- Language: Hindi
- Budget: ₹32.7 million
- Box office: ₹48 million (India Net)

Farishtay (transl. Angels) is a 1991 Indian Hindi-language action drama film directed by Anil Sharma. The film features an ensemble cast of Dharmendra, Vinod Khanna, Rajnikanth, Jaya Prada, Sridevi, Swapna, Kulbhushan Kharbanda, and Sadashiv Amrapurkar.

Farishtay released worldwide on 22 February 1991.

== Plot ==
Raja Jaichand is dictator of a distant area close to border. He rules with brutality, killing innocent for his personal entertainment. He doesn't accept authority of Indian Government and colludes with foreign forces to keep his power. Gayatri lives with her two adopted brothers, by the names of Veeru and Dheeru, who are small-time crooks, and con men, and are known to the local police. When Gayatri meets and falls in love with Police Inspector Arjun Thanghe, the duo are delighted and arrange her marriage with great pomp and ceremony. A flashback sequence reveals that the duo were police trainees. Veeru had fallen in love with their commandant's granddaughter, Sheela. On the day of Holi, Veeru planned to ask her hand in marriage. However, a terrorist kills her along with some family members of other police officers as a revenge for his men. Veeru avenges her death, while Dheeru prevents police force for intervening. They are imprisoned for some time for taking law in their hands. In present, duo are recruited by Jaichand's henchwoman Lilly, to eliminate and take place of commandos sent by government to run Police camp in their village. There they find that Arjun was previously assigned to run the camp. Arjun attempted to set things right, but is killed in the process, and Gayatri loses her sanity. The duo decides to avenge their sister, but are stopped by their commandant. It is then revealed that despite being thrown out of police force, they had been working undercover for him. He compels them to fight smartly. They take help of local girl, Rasbhari and infiltrate secret fortress of Jaichand. After facing much obstacles, including brutish special soldiers who killed Arjun, they are able to take down Jaichand and his army, avenging Gayatri and restoring her sanity.

== Cast ==
- Dharmendra as Virendra "Veeru" Kumar
- Vinod Khanna as Dhirendra "Dheeru" Kumar
- Sridevi as Rasbhari
- Rajinikanth as Inspector Ranoji Rao Shivaji Rao Gaekwad Jadichmul Arjun Tange
- Jaya Prada as Sheela (special appearance)
- Swapna as Gayatri
- Sadashiv Amrapurkar as Raja Jaichand
- Amrit Pal as Gulshanchandra
- Kirti Singh as Lily
- Kulbhushan Kharbanda as Police Commissioner PC Acharya
- Dinesh Hingoo as Laal
- Shammi as Mausi
- Krishan Dhawan as Ramakant
- Rajendra Nath as Mohan Lal
- Brahmachari as Ramu
- Javed Khan Amrohi as Anand Akela
- Manik Irani as Chhediram
- Huma Khan as Maria
- Bob Christo as Bob
- A. K. Hangal as Abdul
- Beena Banerjee as Asha Mathur
- Syed Badr-ul Hasan Khan Bahadur as Pandit
- Guddi Maruti as Bela
- Raj Kishore
- Gautam Sarin
- Bhushan Tiwari
- Anand Balraj as Andy
- Viju Khote and Johnny Lever as Damodar and Fakruddin
- Tom Alter, Jankidas, Sudhir and Yunus Parvez as foreign terrorists.

== Soundtrack ==
The songs were composed by Bappi Lahiri. Lyrics by Anand Bakshi.

Song	Singer
"Thode Se Farishtay, Thode Se Shaitan"	Mohammed Aziz, Amit Kumar
"Is Sansar Mein Sabse Pyaara Bhai Behan Ka Pyaar Hai" (Happy)	Mohammed Aziz, Amit Kumar, Anuradha Paudwal
"Is Sansar Mein Sabse Pyaara Bhai Bahen Ka Pyaar Hai" (Sad)	Mohammed Aziz, Amit Kumar, Anuradha Paudwal
"Tere Bina Jag Lagta Hai Soona"	Lata Mangeshkar, Mohammed Aziz
"Saat Kunwaron Mein Ek Kunwari"	Lata Mangeshkar
"Jhanda Ooncha Rahe Hamara" (Female)	Asha Bhosle
"Jhanda Ooncha Rahe Hamara" (Male)	Shabbir Kumar
"Raja Ka Humne Baja Diya Baaja"	Shabbir Kumar, Alka Yagnik

== Bibliography ==
- Ramachandran, Naman (2014) [2012]. Rajinikanth: The Definitive Biography. Penguin Books. ISBN 978-81-8475-796-5.
