= Phool Aur Angaar =

- Poster
- Directed by: Ashok Gaikwad
- Written by: Santosh Saroj; Salim Akhtar
- Produced by: Salim Akhtar
- Starring: Mithun Chakraborty; Shantipriya; Prem Chopra; Gulshan Grover
- Cinematography: Anwar Siraj
- Music by: Anu Malik
- Distributed by: Aftab Pictures
- Release date: 10 February 1993
- Country: India
- Language: Hindi

Phool Aur Angaar (transl. Flowers and coals) is a 1993 Indian Hindi-language action revenge drama film, directed by Ashok Gaekwad, starring Mithun Chakraborty, Shantipriya, Paresh Rawal, Gulshan Grover, and Prem Chopra. It was the sixth highest grossing Hindi film of 1993 in terms of worldwide box office collection.

== Plot ==
Vijay Saxena lives a middle-class lifestyle along with his college-going sister, Sweety, in a small town in India. He gets a job as a professor at the City College, where he meets Sweety's friend Sudha Verma, and they fall in love. When a student, Adhikari, attempts to molest Sudha, Vijay comes to her rescue. However, Sudha later retracts her accusation and instead blames Vijay for molesting her, forcing him to apologize to Adhikari. Vijay subsequently discovers that Adhikari and some goons had threatened to harm Sudha's younger sister, prompting her false accusation, and Vijay and Sudha resume their relationship. With the help of Inspector Arjun Singh, Vijay has Kalicharan, the son of gangster Natwarlal, arrested, much to Natwarlal's anger. Arjun is later killed, and Sweety witnesses his murder. She takes Inspector Arvind Phadke to the murder scene, but Arjun's body has disappeared. Sweety is subsequently molested and killed, and Phadke arrests Vijay for the crime despite Vijay's protests of innocence. Vijay later takes Kalicharan into a jungle, where Kalicharan is killed by a man-eating lion. Natwarlal and his associates retaliate by killing innocent people. Vijay is shot in a mortuary by Phadke and his men and is believed to be dead. As Natwarlal and his associates prepare to burn his body, Vijay regains consciousness and attacks them. Phadke attempts to flee but, after being suspended from the police force, is killed by Vijay for his crimes. Vijay then kills Natwarlal and his remaining associates. The film ends with Vijay and Sudha reunited.

== Cast ==
- Mithun Chakraborty as Prof. Vijay Omkarnath Saxena
- Shantipriya as Sudha C. Verma
- Prem Chopra as Natwarlal
- Mohnish Bahl as Insp. Arjun Singh
- Gulshan Grover as Police Commissioner Yeshwant Deshpande
- Raza Murad as Principal Verma of City College
- Paresh Rawal as Prof. and principal R. Kothari of City College
- Arjun as Kalicharan, Natwarlal ka beta
- Asrani as Khairatilal
- Arun Bali as Justice Chaudhary
- Ajinkya Deo as Adhikari
- Bob Christo as Mr.Richard (Foreign Drug Mafia)
- Dinesh Hingoo as Hindi Prof Laal Singh, at City College
- Aruna Irani as Mrs. Verma, Sudha's mother
- Goga Kapoor as Randhir Vidyarthi, Chairman of City College
- Shashi Kiran as Sadanand, College Canteen Owner
- Nimai Bali as Vishal, College Student/Police Inspector
- Laxmikant Berde as Ramlakhan Tripathi, College Student/ Advocate
- Satyajeet Puri as Dr Aslam, College Student / Doctor
- Rajesh Puri as Moti, City College Student
- Syed Badr-ul Hasan Khan Bahadur as Bhardwaj, College Student
- Raj Kishore as Prof Darpan, of City College
- Sanam as Sweety O. Saxena, Vijay's sister
- Mahavir Shah as Police inspector Arvind Phadke
- Gurbachan Singh as Gurbachan
- Bhushan Tiwari as Chirajilal Verma, Sudha father
- Ankush Mohit as Dharma

== Soundtrack ==
The songs were composed by Anu Malik. The music of this movie was huge hit, especially "Hum Teri Mohabbat Mein", "Chori Chori Dil Tera" & "Mujhko Peena Hai" etc. According to the Indian trade website Box Office India, with around 2,000,000 units sold the soundtrack became the eleventh highest-selling album of the year.

No.	Title	Lyrics	Singer(s)	Length
1.	"Aashiq Pukaro Awara"	Anwar Sagar	Abhijeet Bhattacharya	8:06
2.	"Chori Chori Dil Tera"	Rani Malik	Kumar Sanu, Sujata Goswami	6:34
3.	"Hum Teri Mohabbat Mein"	Rani Malik	Kumar Sanu, Sadhna Sargam	6:34
4.	"Mujhko Peena Hai"	Zameer Kazmi	Mohammed Aziz	6:21
5.	"Phool Yeh Angaar Ban Gaya"	Deepak Choudhary	Mohammed Aziz	6:34
