= Mela (1971 film) =

- Directed by: Prakash Mehra
- Produced by: A.A Nadiadwala
- Starring: Sanjay Khan; Feroz Khan; Mumtaz
- Music by: R.D. Burman
- Distributed by: A.G. Films (P) Ltd.
- Release date: 30 June 1971
- Country: India
- Language: Hindi

Mela is a 1971 Indian Hindi-language family drama movie directed by Prakash Mehra. This was Prakash Mehra's second directorial venture after Haseena Maan Jayegi (1968).

The movie stars the real life brothers Sanjay Khan and Feroz Khan with Mumtaz as the female lead, Sachin and Rajindernath as the then customary comic relief. The music was by R. D. Burman.

== Cast ==
- Sanjay Khan as Kanhaiya / Kishan Singh
- Mumtaz as Lajjoo Choudhry
- Feroz Khan as Shakti Singh
- Rajendra Nath as Bansilal
- Lalita Pawar as Kanhaiya's foster mom
- Dulari as Shakti's mom
- Raj Kishore as Palm Reader
- Yunus Parvez as Bansilal's customer
- Bhushan Tiwari as Sajjau
- Sachin as Young Shakti Singh (as Master Sachin)
- (Randhir) as Shakti's/Kanhaiya"s Uncle
- (Nikita) as Billoo

== Plot ==
In rural India a small village is ruled by a Panchayat, a group of men who run the lives of the villagers dictatorially. There are three men who challenge their authority, namely Bansilal,(Rajendranath) who is a low-caste Baniya but wants to marry Billoo (Nikita), who is a Brahman; Newcomer to the village, Kanhaiya/Kishan (Sanjay Khan) from the city comes to buy land for farming, He falls in love with Lajjo Choudhary (Mumtaz) after a few incidents, but he is refused permission to meet Lajjo by her father (Brahma Bharadwaj) and Mother (Mumtaz Begum) as no one is aware of his caste, and to make matters worse, he has been brought by a Muslim woman (Lalita Pawar) in the city where she finds him as a child; and finally there is Shakti Singh (Feroz Khan) - a dreaded bandit - who will not permit any daughter of the Panchs to get married as his sweetheart, Santho (Kanan Kaushal), was sexually assaulted and killed by Thakur (Ram Mohan). Shakti will not permit anyone to plow his land as he believes that his evil paternal uncle (Randhir) forged documents to make him the owner, and he blames himself for losing his brother, Kishan, during a Mela 20 years ago. Kanhaiya buys the land from his uncle in the city who dies soon after out of shock upon receiving such a large sum of money. Now Kanhaiya comes with his foster mom to reside at the Uncle s home in the village. The Panch members and other Villagers now watch this move that will put Kanhaiya in direct conflict with Shakti - who has already killed five former owners who had dared to buy and plow this piece of land. Now Kanhaiya takes up the challenge to plow the purchased land in spite of being warned by Shakti's fellow bandit's.Shakti confronts Kanhaiya on the field but he is shot at and driven by the police patrol.Shakti return s back and burn's Kanhaiya s crops burns his house and carries away Lajjo from the village Kanhaiya follows the bandits in pursuit and enters Shakti's hideout to rescue Lajjo.

== Soundtrack ==
#	Title	Singer(s)
1	"Dekho Re Hua Lahoo Se Lahoo Kaise Judaa"	Manna Dey
2	"Ek Baar Rakh De Kadam Zara Jhoom Ke"	Lata Mangeshkar, Mohammed Rafi
3	"Gori Ke Haath Mein Jaise Ye Challa"	Lata Mangeshkar, Mohammed Rafi
4	"Kya Soch Raha Re"	Lata Mangeshkar
5	"Meri Sakhiyo Bolo"	Mohammed Rafi, Asha Bhosle
6	"Rut Hai Milan Ki Sathi Mera Aa Re"	Lata Mangeshkar, Mohammed Rafi
