= Elaan-E-Jung =

1989 Indian film in Hindi by Anil Sharma

- Poster
- Directed by: Anil Sharma
- Written by: Anil Sharma
- Produced by: Anil Sharma; K.C. Sharma
- Starring: Dharmendra; Jaya Prada
- Music by: Laxmikant–Pyarelal
- Distributed by: S.K.F. Films
- Release date: 18 August 1989
- Running time: 155 minutes
- Country: India
- Language: Hindi

Elaan-E-Jung (Declaration of War) is a 1989 Bollywood action film directed by Anil Sharma, starring Dharmendra, Jaya Prada, Sadashiv, Dara Singh and Joginder and released by S.K.F. Films.

== Plot ==
A small Indian village is terrorized by a terrorist called Kalanag who wants to destroy the country and become its ruler.

== Cast ==
Actor	Role	Character	Notes
Dharmendra	Arjun Singh	Thakur	
Jaya Prada	Reema	Arjun Love Interest	
Dara Singh	Bheema	Arjun Singh Man	
Sadashiv Amrapurkar	Durjan Narayan/Kaala Naag	CRF Chief	First he was Dacoit after he becomes CRF chief
Arun Bakshi		Indian Soldier War Prisoner in Kaalanag Custody	
Chandrashekhar Vaidya	Pandit Surinder Mehra	Temple Priest of Village	
Sushma Seth	Lajwanti	Arjun Singh's Mother	
Puneet Issar	Raj Shekhar	CBI Officer, Brother of Reema	
Suhas Joshi	Devika	Reema and Rajshekar Mother	
Rajendra Nath	Prem Prakash	Manager, Honeymoon Massage Parlour	
Guddi Maruti		Football, Massage girl in Massage Parlour	
Rajan Haksar	Vijay Narayan	Zamindaar	
Vikram Gokhale	Vijay Singh	Police Inspector	
Viju Khote	Khote	Police Inspector	
Ajit Vachani	Ajit Dandu	Police Inspector	After Promotion becomes Commissioner
Sudhir Pandey	Thakur Shankar Singh	Arjun Singh's Father	
Tiku Talsania	Narayan Singh	Seth	
Chand Usmani	Ranjana Prasad	Villager	
Joginder	Sattar	Kaala Naag's Henchman	
Dev Kumar	Vikraal	Kaala Naag's Henchman	
Bob Christo	Richard	Kaala Naag's Henchman	
Praveen Kumar	Suraj Srivastav	Kaala Naag's Henchman	
Surendra Pal	Rakesh	Kaala Naag's Henchman	
Bhushan Tiwari	Imbibe	Kaala Naag's Henchman	
Sudhir	Jaichand	Arjun Singh's Man	
Annu Kapoor	Kabir	Arjun Singh's Man	
Lilliput	Anand	Arjun Singh's Man	
Gurbachan Singh	Dharam Singh	Arjun Singh's Man	

== Music ==
1. "Doston Se Dosti Dushmano Se Dushmani v1" – Mohammed Aziz, Anuradha Paudwal
2. "Doston Se Dosti Dushmano Se Dushmani v2" – Anuradha Paudwal, Nitin Mukesh
3. "Doston Se Dosti Dushmano Se Dushmani v3" – Mohammed Aziz
4. "Doston Se Dosti Dushmano Se Dushmani v4" – Mohammed Aziz
5. "Jaan Vatan Ko Denge" – Mohammed Aziz
6. "Mera Naam Hai Badnaam Ho Gaya" – Alka Yagnik
7. "Mera Naam Reema Hai" – Alka Yagnik & Shabbir Kumar
8. "Tik Tik Tik Tik Chalti Hai Ghadi" – Anuradha Paudwal

== Release and reception ==
The film was released on 18 August 1989 and was highly successful at the BoxOffice.

A reviewer in Democratic World stated: "Darshak is repetitive. So are the dialogues by Sadashiv Amrapurkar - one has heard them before." India Today stated that Dharmendra had been "roped" into making the film, highlighting his barefoot classical dance.

When Dharmendra was later asked in an interview if he had any regrets about making the film he said: "No. Why should I regret having churned out hits like Hukumat and Elaan E Jung? I have no regrets having made those films which continue to be landmarks as far as my career is concerned".
