= Chandi Sona =

- Promotional poster
- Directed by: Sanjay Khan
- Produced by: Sanjay Khan
- Starring: Sanjay Khan; Parveen Babi; Premnath; Pran; Ranjeet; Danny Denzongpa
- Music by: R. D. Burman
- Release date: 25 March 1977
- Country: India
- Language: Hindi

Chandi Sona (Note: The phrase translates as "silver and gold". But figuratively it often refers to "riches and wealth", especially when it is ill-gotten.) is a 1977 Indian Hindi-language film. Directed and produced by Sanjay Khan, the film stars Sanjay Khan, Parveen Babi, Premnath, Pran, Ranjeet, Danny Denzongpa, Asrani, Paintal, Kamini Kaushal, Iftekhar and Raj Kapoor (in a special appearance). The film's music is by R. D. Burman.

== Plot ==
A group of people of Indian origin live on an island which contains a tomb of Shahenshah Chandi Sona which is believed to contain jewelry, diamonds and gold. Mayur and Rita, stage actor love-birds, plot with Amar to steal this wealth and better their lives. They decide to buy a house from a woman named Mayadevi, and after doing so they decide to make a swimming pool and through that dig a tunnel right underneath the tomb and help themselves to the riches that they find there. They also decide to enlist the help of four jailbirds by dramatically helping them to escape from prison. After the completion of the tunnel, they run into an underground pool of water and enlist the help of undersea divers Vikram and Sharma. What this group does not know is that there is an ancient creature that is lying in wait for food; that Mayadevi is not who she claims to be, and she has an ulterior motive for herself.

== Cast ==
- Sanjay Khan as Mayur
- Parveen Babi as Rita
- Pran as Amar
- Premnath as Lord Mayor Jojo
- Ranjeet as Sheru
- Danny Denzongpa as Vikram
- Asrani as Abdullah
- Paintal as Bunny
- Kamini Kaushal as Maya
- Iftekhar as Police Commissioner
- Raj Kapoor as Gyspy Singer

== Soundtrack ==
#	Song	Singer
1	"Uljhan Hazaar Koi Daale, Rukte Kahan Hai Dilwale"	Kishore Kumar, Asha Bhosle, Manna Dey
2	"Aap Sa Koi Haseen Dilruba O Dilnasheen"	Kishore Kumar, Asha Bhosle
3	"Socha Tha Maine To Ae Jaan Meri"	Kishore Kumar, Asha Bhosle
4	"Tujhe Bhoolke"	Mukesh
5	"Ek Shokh Haseena Se Armaanbhari Shaadi"	Mohammed Rafi, Manna Dey
6	"Dance Music"	R. D. Burman
