= 1857 Kranti =

Indian Television Series

- Genre: Historical drama
- Written by: Sanjay Khan; Nawa Lucknowi; Samidha-Khalid; Hasan Kamal
- Directed by: Sanjay Khan
- Creative director: Farah Khan
- Starring: S. M. Zaheer; Maya Alagh; Lalit Tiwari; Bhupinder Singh; Barkha Madan
- Composer: Mohammed Zahur Khayyam
- Country of origin: India
- Original language: Hindi
- No. of seasons: 1
- No. of episodes: 104

Production
- Executive producer: S. Mirza Khan
- Producer: Sanjay Khan
- Cinematography: Sushil Chopra
- Editors: Aditya Warrior; Rajesh Rajput
- Production company: Numero Uno International

Original release
- Network: DD National
- Release: 29 December 2002 – 21 December 2003

1857 Kranti is an Indian historical drama television series directed by Sanjay Khan and produced by Numero Uno International Limited. The drama, aired on Doordarshan National from 29 December, 2002 to 21 December, 2003, for a total of 104 episodes. 1857 Kranti tells the story of the Indian Revolt of 1857. The drama was temporarily interrupted after four episodes in its earlier run due to change in commissioning norms.

== Cast ==
- Lalit Tiwari as Baji Rao II
- Ashok Banthia as Moropant, advisor to Baji Rao II
- Sunil Singh as Tatya Tope
- Bhupinder Singh as Nana Saheb Peshwa II
- Barkha Madan as Lakshmibai
- S. M. Zaheer as Bahadur Shah Zafar
- Jitendra Trehan as Gangadhar Rao / Ghulam Abbas
- Ajay Trehan as Kunwar Singh
- Maya Alagh as Zeenat Mahal
- Shashank Trivedi as Young Nana Saheb Peshwa II
- Siraj Mustafa Khan as Siraj-ud-Daulah
- Nawab Shah as Robert Clive
- Gireesh Sahdev as William Bentinck
- Anwar Fatehan as Mir Jafar
- Anupam Shyam as Pandit Vadarayan
- Rishabh Shukla as Ghalib
- Saurabh Dubey as Trimbakrao Pandit, Raj Purohit in Jhansi State
- Vinod Kapoor as William Stephen Raikes Hodson
- Ahmed Khan as Lord Dalhousie
- Hariom Parashar as Narayan Bhat aka Madhav Narayan
- Surbhi Tiwari as Vaishali, Nana Sahib's wife
- Manish Khanna as Azimullah Khan
- Syed Badr-ul Hasan Khan Bahadur as Manekchand

=== Cameo ===
- Raza Murad as Jahangir
- Tej Sapru as Thomas Roe

== Background and production ==
Speaking at the launch of the drama, Sanjay Khan, Chairman and Managing Director of the Numero Uno said, "The revolt of 1857 referred to as the Second Mutiny by the British is a very important facet of India’s freedom struggle. Therefore, in the age of low-cost family dramas, I have attempted to bring serials which have qualities of an epic and good cinematic values. India's first war of independence of 1857 is not more than three pages in any school textbook. What we are presenting is the drama and the sacrifices that people made for the nation so that nationalistic fervour is never lessened, but enhanced." There are quite a few songs in the drama that don't stop the progression of the story. We have recorded three songs out of the 20 planned. "We are proud to say this is the most expensive serial on Indian television, a television series on a cinematic scale," claims Hormuzda Davar, the CEO of the Numero Uno. The crew included over 150 technicians, 80 artistes, 150 horses, 10 elephants, 50 camels and over 2000 sword fighters. The drama approximately cost Rs 16 crore.

The first 12 episodes of the drama was shot in Rajasthan, Chambal, Trichur, Red Fort, Umargaon and Cochin at a cost of Rs 2.5 crore. From 6 April 2003, the 1857 Kranti shifted to the Sunday prime time (at 2130 instead of 1100 hours) on DD National to boost the viewership.
