= Abdullah (film) =

1980 Indian film directed by Sanjay Khan

- Film poster
- Directed by: Sanjay Khan
- Written by: Kader Khan (dialogues); George Marzbetuny (story)
- Produced by: Asghar Ali; Abbas Khan; Zarine Khan
- Starring: Raj Kapoor; Sanjay Khan; Zeenat Aman; Danny Denzongpa
- Cinematography: V. Gopi Krishna
- Edited by: M. S. Shinde
- Music by: R. D. Burman
- Production company: Zafo Films Private Limited Productions
- Release date: 26 September 1980
- Country: India
- Language: Hindi
- Box office: ₹3.4 crore

Abdullah is a 1980 Indian Bollywood romantic drama film directed by Sanjay Khan. It stars Raj Kapoor in the title role, with Sanjay Khan, Zeenat Aman, Danny Denzongpa in the pivotal roles. Other casts include Sanjeev Kumar, Madan Puri, Sujit Kumar, Om Prakash, Mehmood, Kader Khan, Farida Jalal in minor roles. The story was written by George Marzbetuny and Kader Khan wrote the dialogues. It was one of the most expensive Indian films at the time.

== Plot ==
In an unspecified Arab country, Khaleel is a dangerous outlaw bringing terror to the land. Sheikh Mohammed Al-Kamal is a man of honour, who helps to protect people from harm and is asked by the government to help search for Khaleel. The quest to bring Khaleel to justice becomes a personal one for the Sheikh when his wife Zainab is injured during a bungled kidnap attempt by Khaleel.

Abdullah is a devout Muslim who lives in a small hut in the middle of the desert, and looks after a well which provides water to thirsty travelers. One day a friend, Ameer, informs him that Khaleel had raided a settlement nearby, killing everyone except for Yashoda, a pregnant woman. Shortly thereafter, Ameer himself is killed, a mortally wounded Yashoda gives birth to a boy, names him Krishna, asks Abdullah to care for him, and passes away. Abdullah overcomes his fears of bringing up a Hindu boy, and looks after Krishna as his own son.

One day Khaleel's magician informs him that he is going to die at the hands of Krishna. Just as the Hindu deity Krishna once slew Kansa, his maternal uncle, so also will Khaleel's life end at this Krishna's hands. Angered by this, Khaleel sets out to kill Krishna. He attacks Abdullah, abducts Krishna and readies to kill the boy to get rid of any threat against him. In response, Abdullah and the Sheikh set out to stop this and to deal with Khaleel once and for all.

== Cast ==
- Raj Kapoor as Abdullah
- Sanjay Khan as Shaikh Mohammed-Al-Qamaal
- Zeenat Aman as Zainab
- Danny Denzongpa as Khaleel
- Sujit Kumar as Jamaal
- Om Prakash as Hindu Priest
- Mehmood as Ahmed
- Sanjeev Kumar as Ameer
- Madan Puri as Military Commander
- Kader Khan as Military Officer
- Farida Jalal as Yashoda
- Rajeev Bhatia as Krishna
- Nazir Hussain as Blind Man
- Bob Christo as Magician
- Helen as Item Dancer in song "Jashn-E-Bahaara"

== Soundtrack ==
The music was composed by R. D. Burman. Lyrics written by Anand Bakshi.

Song	Singer
"Om Jai Jagdish Hare"	Lata Mangeshkar
"Maine Poochha Chand Se"	Mohammed Rafi
"Lalla Allah Tera Nigahbaan"	Manna Dey
"Ae Khuda Har Faisla Tera"	Kishore Kumar
"Bheega Badan Jalne Laga"	Asha Bhosle
"Jashn-E-Bahaara"	Asha Bhosle

== Box office ==
Abdullah grossed ₹3.4 crore at the domestic Indian box office, making it 1980's 17th highest-grossing film in India. However, the film's performance at the domestic box office was deemed below average. Despite under-performing at the domestic Indian box office, the film became an overseas blockbuster at the Soviet box office, due to the popularity of Raj Kapoor in the Soviet Union. It drew an audience of 31.9 million Soviet viewers in 1983, the highest for an Indian film that year, making it one of the top 30 most popular Indian films in the Soviet Union.
