= Anjori Alagh =

Indian actress and model

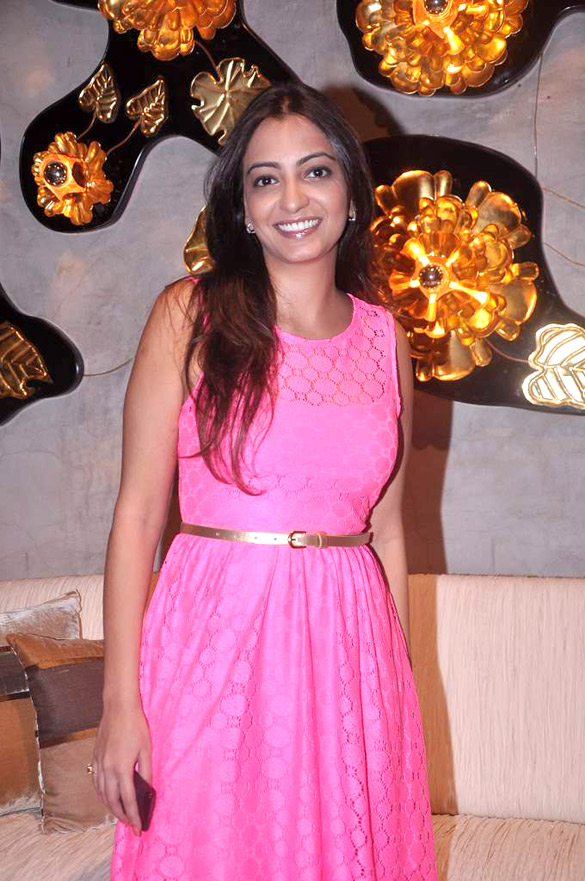
- Alagh at the Charcoal Houseproud.in launch, 2012
- Born: Anjori Alagh; Mumbai, Maharashtra, India
- Other name: Anjori Sunil Alagh
- Occupation: Actress
- Years active: 2007–2014
- Parents: Sunil Alagh (father); Maya Alagh (mother)
- Relatives: Sameer Nair (brother-in-law)

Anjori Alagh is a former Indian actress and model. She is the daughter of actress Maya Alagh and Sunil Alagh. She made her first appearance at the age of 4 in an advertisement. Her debut film was Vikram Bhatt's Life Mein Kabhie Kabhiee (2007). She is a trained Kathak dancer.

== Background ==
Anjori was born to the Alagh Punjabi family in Ludhiana, Punjab. Her mother, Maya Alagh, is a popular Bollywood character actress, her father, Sunil Alagh, was CEO of Britannia Industries. Anjori also has a sister named Sawari who is married to Sameer Nair (CEO of NDTV).

== Career ==
Anjori Alagh began acting at age four and did a number of advertisements for Maggi and Kodak with Prahlad Kakkar. At age 10, Anjori quit acting to complete her studies. She went to the US to study economics and business management in Ohio. After a summer stint at Stanford Acting School, she completed her studies and returned to India where she trained at the Kishore Namit Kapoor Acting Institute. Her mother guided Anjori early on in her career and introduced her to filmmaker Vikram Bhatt. Anjori made quite an impression on Bhatt and a few months later, Anjori received a call from Bhatt who offered her a role in his movie Life Mein Kabhie Kabhiee. Bhatt was impressed by her performance and cast her again in his next film 1920 in 2008, which was a critical and commercial success at the box office. Anjori has also acted in the NDTV Imagine serial Seeta Aur Geeta.

== Filmography ==
Year	Film	Role	Notes
2007	Life Mein Kabhie Kabhiee	Ishita Sharma	Bollywood Debut
2008	1920	Gayatri	Hindi
2009	Fame	Unknown	English
2014	Manjunath	Sujata	

== Television ==
Year	Serial	Role(s)	Channel	Notes
2009	Seeta Aur Geeta	Seeta/ Geeta	Imagine	Double Role
