= Ek Phool Do Mali =

1969 film by Devendra Goel

- Film poster
- Directed by: Devendra Goel
- Written by: Mushtaq Jalili
- Produced by: Devendra Goel
- Starring: Balraj Sahni; Sanjay Khan; Sadhana
- Cinematography: Keki Mistry
- Edited by: R. V. Shrikhande
- Music by: Ravi
- Release date: 7 May 1969
- Country: India
- Language: Hindi
- Box office: 5 crore

Ek Phool Do Mali (transl. One Flower Two Gardeners) is a 1969 Indian Hindi film directed by Devendra Goel. The film is based on the book Do Kadam Aage by Sampat Lal Purohit. The film was a blockbuster and the second highest-grossing Indian movie of 1969 along with Aradhana & Do Raaste. Balraj Sahni earned a Filmfare nomination as Best Supporting Actor. The story was miscredited to Mushtaq Jalili, and is said to have been an adaptation of the 1961 Hollywood classic Fanny, which is debatable. The film was remade in Turkish as Evlat in 1972.

== Plot ==
Somna is a poor woman living with her widowed mother, Leela, in the mountainous region of India and Nepal. She makes a living working on the apple farm of the wealthy widower, Kailash Nath Kaushal. Kaushal also runs a mountaineering school where Amar Kumar is one of his students. Somna and Amar meet, fall in love and decide to get married shortly after Amar returns from a climbing expedition. A few days later, following an avalanche, they get the news that Amar and the other climbers have been killed.

A devastated Somna is molested by Shamsher Singh. Kailash comes to her rescue and offers to marry her when he finds out that she is pregnant. They get married and Somna gives birth to a boy, Bobby. Shamsher is arrested and sent to jail for 6 years. Kailash, who is unable to have children after an accident, is thrilled to be a father. He adores and is inseparable from Bobby. Five years later, Somna and Kailash, while celebrating Bobby's 6th birthday, get a shock when Amar shows up at the party.

Bobby loves his father (Kailash) but can't help but become close with Amar, his biological father, much to Somna and Kailash's dismay. Somna forbids Bobby from meeting Amar, but Kailash supports him and tells Somna all he wants is to see Bobby happy. Somna confronts Amar and confesses that she does not want him to visit anymore. Amar is distressed by this and vows to stop seeing Bobby.

During a walk with Kailash, Bobby sees Amar and tries to catch up to him, but ends up in a dynamite zone, injuring himself in the process. At the hospital, the doctor states that his condition is bad as he has lost a lot of blood. Kailash offers to give blood, but his type does not match. Amar then offers his blood, which saves Bobby's life. Kailash is glad that Bobby is alive, but cannot get over the fear of Amar taking him away.

Amar pieces together the facts and realises that Bobby is indeed his son. Just as Kailash feared, he comes to take him away while Bobby is unconscious. Somna stops him and explains to him that Bobby is not his son nor her son but Kailash's son. She explains to him that he saved her dignity by marrying her in spite of knowing the truth and how he loved Bobby more than anyone else and raised him like his own son. Kailash overhears the whole conversation secretly. Amar, saddened by this, regrets his actions and decides to let Kailash keep Bobby and leaves them forever.

Kailash asks Somna to get back together with Amar and take Bobby with them, but she refuses. Just as Amar leaves the next day, much to Bobby's dismay, Shamsher returns to the house and kidnaps Bobby in demand for a ransom as well as Somna. However, Bobby escapes Shamsher's clutches and spots Amar in the distance. He runs after Amar, but Shamsher gets hold of him once more and Kailash and Somna step in to rescue him. Kailash fights Shamsher, but is eventually beaten. Shamsher throws Bobby off a cliff and chases after Somna.

When all seems lost, Amar steps in having seen the happenings from the mountain and fights Shamsher. Bobby is shown to be alive clinging on to a branch off the cliff side. Amar knocks Shamsher to the ground and descends using a rope, to rescue Bobby as the branch begins to snap. Shamsher returns and tries to cut the rope. He easily overpowers Somna until Kailash intervenes. Despite all the thrashing Shamsher gives to Kailash, he refuses to let go of the rope. In a fit of rage, Shamsher runs towards him hoping to tackle him to the ground, but Kailash uses the last of his strength to kick him off the cliff side and Shamsher plummets to his death; the rope then cuts his hands further and becomes too slippery for him to hold any longer, and slips out of his grasp—but Amar has already reached the top of the cliff and climbs back over.

Amar climbs to safety with Bobby. Along with Somna, he tries to help Kailash, but it is too late for him. Kailash, in his last few moments, states that he is happy that Bobby is alive and tells Amar to take good care of him. All three mourn the loss of Kailash.

A few years later, Amar and Somna are shown to be together and are admitting Bobby to the school in Uhuru. The headmaster asks for Bobby's last name and assumes it to be Amar. Amar states that is not true and declares him to be Bobby Kailash, the son of Kailash Nath Kaushal. The film ends with all three looking into the horizon.

== Cast ==
- Balraj Sahni as Kailashnath Kaushal
- Sanjay Khan as Amar Kumar
- Sadhana Shivdasani as Somna
- Durga Khote as Leela
- David as Doctor
- Brahmachari as Bahadur Singh
- Shabnam as Shobha Singh
- Bobby as Bobby Kaushal
- Manorama as Champa
- Shyam Kumar as Shamsher Singh
- Praveen Paul as Mrs. Kumar
- Brahm Bhardwaj as Mr. Kumar

== Soundtrack ==
All of the songs were composed by Ravi & Lyrics are penned by Prem Dhawan, Rajkavi Inderjeet Singh Tulsi and Ravi himself. The music of Ek Phool Do Mali became very famous.

No.	Title	Singer(s)	Length
1.	"Kismat Ke Khel Nirale"	Ravi
2.	"Tujhe Suraj Kahun Ya Chanda" (Raga Jhinjhoti, with Khamaj)	Manna Dey
3.	"O Nanhe Se Farishte" (Raga Bhairavi)	Mohammed Rafi
4.	"Yeh Parda Hata Do, Zara Mukhda Dikha Do"	Mohammed Rafi, Asha Bhosle
5.	"Auladwalon Phoolo Phalo"	Mohammed Rafi, Asha Bhosle
6.	"Chal Chal Re Naujawaan"	Mohammed Rafi, Asha Bhosle
7.	"Saiyan Le Gayi Jiya"	Asha Bhosle
8.	"Sajna Sajna O Sajna"	Asha Bhosle
