= Upaasna =

- Directed by: Mohan
- Starring: Sanjay Khan; Mumtaz; Feroz Khan
- Music by: Kalyanji Anandji
- Distributed by: Mohan Films Pvt.Ltd
- Release date: 15 March 1971
- Country: India
- Language: Hindi

Upaasna (transl. Devotion) is a 1971 Bollywood drama film directed by Mohan. The film stars Sanjay Khan, Mumtaz and Feroz Khan. The film has a very melodious song "Aao Tumhe Main Pyaar Sikha Du, Sikhla Do Na". Other songs are "Darpan Ko Dekha" and "Meri Jawani Pyaar Ko Tarse".

== Cast ==
- Sanjay Khan ... Mohan
- Mumtaz ... Shalu/Kiran/Asha
- Feroz Khan ... Ram(Mohan s brother)
- Helen as Julie/Lily (Cabaret Dancer)
- Kishan Mehta as Jagdish(Julie's lover)
- Anwar Hussain as John Dsouza
- Asit Sen as Raja More ( Mohan/Rams Servant)
- Tun Tun as Champakali (vegetable vendor)
- Murad as Judge
- Jagdish Raj as Inspector Verma
- Indira Bansal as person in car for lift by mohan
- Polson as person in car for lift by mohan/shalu
- Brahm Bhardwaj (as doctor)
- Mukri as Baney Miyan( Mohans friend)
- Dayal Kumar as Dayal
- Baby Seema as Dolly ( Julie's Daughter)
- Sonia Sahni as Geeta (Rams ex girlfriend)

== Soundtrack ==
Songs	Singer
"Meri Jawani Pyar Ko"	Asha Bhosle
"Mujhko To Peeni Hai"	Asha Bhosle
"Pyar Sikha Doon"	Mohammed Rafi, Lata Mangeshkar
"Darpan Ko Dekha Tune"	Mukesh
"Tumhein Apna Na Banaya"	Asha Bhosle
"Kali Kali Sari"	Mahendra Kapoor, Mukri
