= Sunil Alagh =

Indian business leader

- Citizenship: India
- Education: IIM Calcutta
- Occupation: Businessman
- Organization: Prasar Bharati
- Spouse: Maya Alagh
- Children: Anjori Alagh
- Relatives: Sameer Nair (son-in-law)

Sunil Alagh is an Indian business executive and management consultant, known for his tenure as the managing director and chief executive officer of Britannia Industries.

== Career ==
He is a former managing director and chief executive officer of Britannia Industries, an Indian food corporation. He joined Britannia in December 1974 and was the company's managing director for over a decade.

After his exit from Britannia, Alagh founded a consulting firm, SKA Advisors, which advises clients on marketing strategies. He was appointed as the President of the All India Management Association (AIMA) in 2004. He was also the host of The Job Show on CNBC India, the first televised job hunt on Indian television. In 2020, he was appointed as advisory board chief at Vikas Multicorp.

== Personal life ==
Alagh is married to Maya Alagh, an actress. Their daughter, Anjori Alagh is also an actress. His son-in-law, Sameer Nair (m. Sawari Alagh) is a senior media executive and CEO of Applause Entertainment. Alagh is an alumnus of the Indian Institute of Management Calcutta.
