= Maya Alagh =

Indian television and film actress

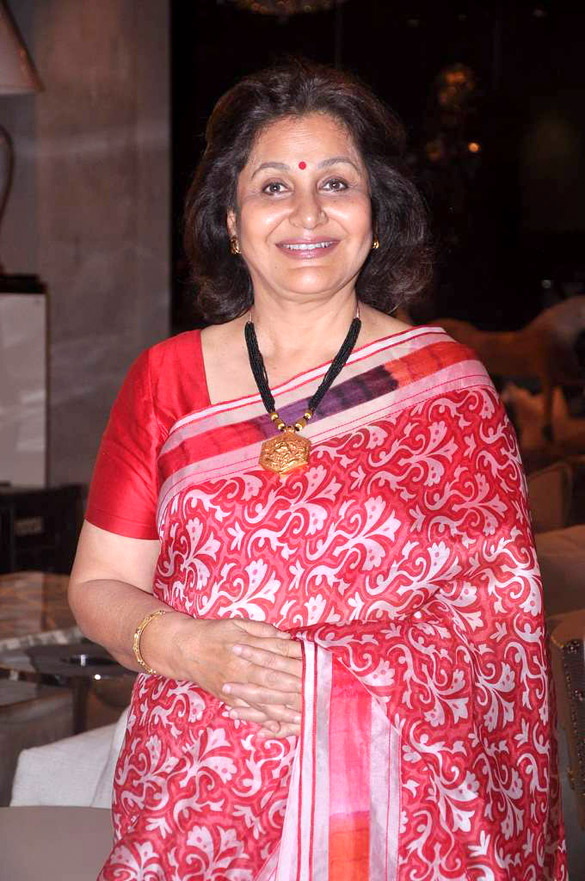
- Alagh at the Charcoal-Houseproud.in launch in 2012
- Born: Kanpur, Uttar Pradesh
- Education: Loreto Convent Intermediate College
- Occupation: Actress
- Years active: 1980–2006, 2022–2022
- Spouse: Sunil Alagh
- Children: Sawari Alagh, Anjori Alagh
- Relatives: Sameer Nair (son-in-law)

Maya Alagh is an Indian television and film actress.

== Early and personal life ==
Maya is married to Sunil Alagh, who is a former managing director and CEO of Britannia Industries. Their daughter Anjori Alagh is also an actress. Maya started off her career as a model. She was noticed by actor, Dalip Tahil when she had gone to pick up her husband, Sunil Alagh. Dalip offered her an ad film, which she auditioned for. She was however rejected because she didn't 'look poor enough'.

== Work ==
Maya made her television debut with the mystery-drama Chhoti Badi Baatein. It aired on Doordarshan TV (previously DD National) in the year 1986. The serial was based on the concept of superstitions.

== Filmography ==
- Thodisi Bewafaii (1980)
- Naqli Chehra (Video) (1987)
- Mere Baad (1988)
- Yalgaar (1992)
- Aaina (1993)
- Chandra Mukhi (1993)
- Phool (1993)
- Betaaj Badshah (1994)
- Jawab (1995)
- Dance Party (1995)
- Saajan Ki Baahon Mein (1995)
- Guddu (1995)
- Diya Aur Toofan (1995)
- Ram Shastra (1995)
- Aashique Mastane (1995)
- Sanam (1997)
- Wajood (1998)
- Kachche Dhaage (1999)
- Albela (2001)
- Rehnaa Hai Terre Dil Mein (2001)
- Mujhse Dosti Karoge! (2002)
- Talaash: The Hunt Begins (2003)
- Andaaz (2003)
- Sssshhh (2003)
- LOC Kargil (2003)
- Page 3 (2005)
- Mere Jeevan Saathi (2006)
- Umrao Jaan (2006)

== Television ==
- Kavita
- Chhoti Badi Baatein (1986)
- The Sword of Tipu Sultan (1990)
- The Great Maratha (1994)
- Andaz (1994)
- Jai Hanuman (1997-2000)
- Ghutan (1997-1998)
- Heena (1998-2003)
- Kittie Party
- 1857 Kranti (2000–01)
- Noorjahan (2000-2001)
- Kaisa Ye Pyar Hai (2005)
- Adaalat (2010-2016) as Karan Divakar Pathak's mother
- Bloody Brothers (2022) as Sheila on ZEE5
