= Akbar Khan (director) =

Indian actor, screenwriter (born 1949)

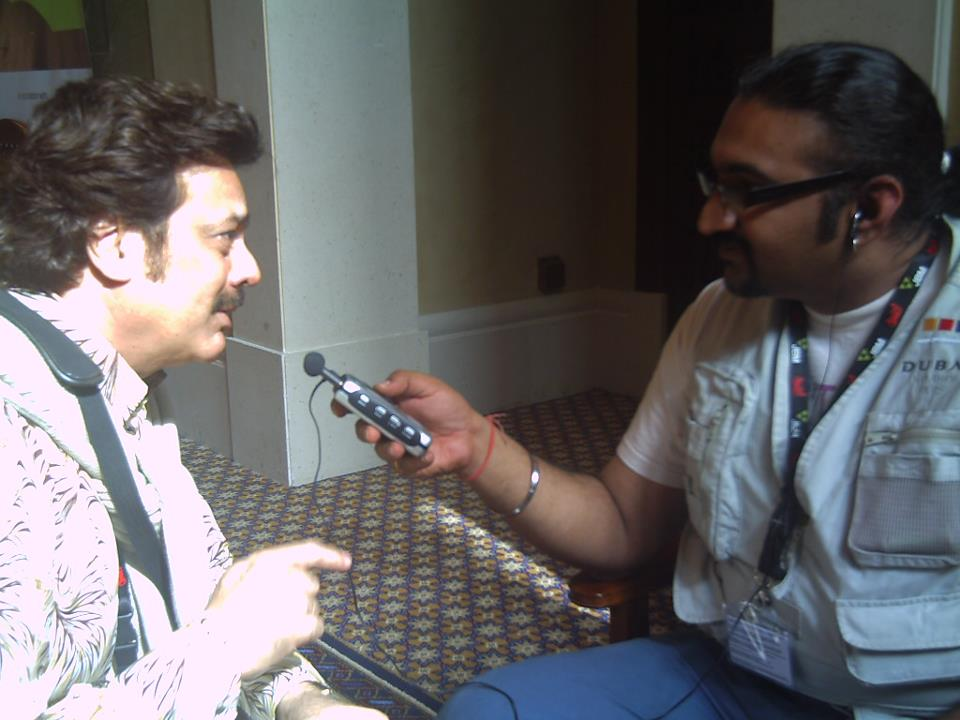
- Akbar Khan (left)
- Born: 7 July 1949 (age 76); Bangalore, Mysore State, India
- Occupations: Actor; screenwriter; film producer; director
- Relatives: Feroz Khan (brother); Sanjay Khan (brother); Fardeen Khan (nephew); Sussanne Khan (niece); Zayed Khan (nephew)
- Family: see Family details

Akbar Khan (born 7 July 1949) is an Indian actor, screenwriter, film producer and director. He is the youngest brother of the Indian actors, producers, editors and directors, Feroz Khan and Sanjay Khan.

== Early life ==
Akbar was born on 7 July 1949, in Bangalore, India, to Sadiq Ali Khan and Fatima. His father was an Afghan Pathan from Ghazni, Afghanistan, while his mother had Persian ancestry from Iran. His brothers are the legendary actor-filmmaker Feroz Khan, actor-filmmaker Sanjay Khan, Sameer Khan and Shahruq Khan. His sisters are Dilshad and Khurshid.

Khan was educated at Bishop Cotton Boys' School and St. Germain High School, both in Bangalore.

== Career ==
Akbar started his career as an assistant director to filmmakers and in 1974, he made his acting debut in the film Anjaan Rahain, which starred his brother Feroz in the main lead. He was also assistant director to his brother Feroz in Apradh (1972). After acting in a couple of films, Akbar turned producer-director with Haadsa (1983), starring himself in the lead. He also starred in his brother Sanjay Khan's directorial venture Kala Dhanda Gorey Log (1986). After acting in Aakarshan (1988), Akbar turned his attention to the TV industry and directed the first 15 episodes of his brother Sanjay Khan's epic TV Serial, The Sword of Tipu Sultan.

Khan produced-directed and also played the title role of Emperor Akbar in the classic TV serial Akbar The Great. In 2005, Akbar produced-directed the magnum opus Taj Mahal: An Eternal Love Story. He also launched Pakistan's legendary actress-singer Noor Jehan's granddaughter Sonya Jehan in the film, which also starred Kabir Bedi, Zulfi Syed, Arbaaz Khan and Pooja Batra. It was the costliest film made in India at that time, with a budget of INR 60 crores. It was also the first Indian film to release in Pakistani cinemas, as Indian films were banned there since the Indo-Pak war of 1965. Akbar, along with his family and other Indian film stars also visited Pakistan in April 2006 and actively promoted the film. The film was poorly marketed in India by Mukta Arts, which led to a dispute between Akbar, Subhash Ghai and Yash Chopra. The film was highly appreciated at nearly all international film festivals. Akbar plans to re-release the film in India and abroad very soon, as many people didn't know that it actually released in 2005. Akbar then starred in Vashu Bhagnani's Faltu (2011) and played the main lead in Faraar (2011).

Khan was involved in the petrochemical business with his company Abraiz Petrochemicals. He also had business interests in Iran. He lives at Oberoi Enclave in Juhu, Mumbai, near his late brother Feroz's bungalow.

== Filmography ==
=== Actor ===
Year	Film	Character
1974	Anjaan Raahen	Rajan
1974	Do Badnaam	Unreleased film
1976	Adalat	Himself
1983	Haadsaa	Jai Kumar
1986	Swati	Ram Mohan
1986	Kala Dhanda Goray Log	Ramu
1986	Jumbish	Sagar / Manas
1987	Muqaddar Ka Faisla	Dr. Harish Kumar
1987	Panchavati	Yatin
1988	Akarshan	Abhishek
1989	Tujhe Nahin Chhodunga	
1990	Chahungi Tujhe Bar Bar	
1990	Khalbali	Unreleased film
2000	Mission Kashmir	
2003	Escape From Taliban	Sawali
2008	Pranali: The Tradition	Hawaldar at Court
2011	F.A.L.T.U	Mr.Vardhan
2013	Shootout at Wadala	Haji Masood
2015	Welcome 2 Karachi	Pakistani Cop

=== Films ===
Year	Movie
1983	Haadsaa
2005	Taj Mahal

=== Television ===
Year	Serial	Character
1988–1989	Akbar – The Great	Jalaluddin Akbar
1990–1991	The Sword of Tipu Sultan	
