= Life Mein Kabhie Kabhiee =

- Theatrical release poster
- Directed by: Vikram Bhatt
- Screenplay by: Manoj Tyagi
- Dialogues by: Girish Dhamija
- Story by: Girish Dhamija
- Produced by: Ajay Acharya; Gordhan Tanwani
- Starring: Aftab Shivdasani; Dino Morea; Nauheed Cyrusi; Anjori Alagh; Nikita Anand; Rajat Bedi; Mohnish Bahl
- Cinematography: Pravin Bhatt
- Edited by: Akshay Mohan; Sandeep Francis
- Music by: Lalit Pandit
- Distributed by: Gangani Multimedia Corporations; Srishti Creations
- Release date: 13 April 2007
- Country: India
- Language: Hindi

Life Mein Kabhi Kabhiee (transl. At Times in Life) is a 2007 Indian Hindi-language social thriller film directed by Vikram Bhatt. The film stars Aftab Shivdasani, Dino Morea, Anjori Alagh, Nauheed Cyrusi, and Sameer Dattani. It was released on 13 April 2007. The film was declared a box office disaster.

== Plot ==
The film begins with Manish Gupta in a press conference about his best-selling book Life Mein Kabhie Kabhiee.

It then goes into a flashback where five friends (including him) — Rajeev Arora, Jai Gokhale, Ishita Sharma, and Monica Seth — are fresh out of college. They are caught drunk and are in a lockup. In the meantime, they make a bet to determine who will find the most fulfillment in life. The winner will be the person who has found the most happiness in life within five years.

Rajeev, the younger brother of business tycoon Sanjeev Arora, is an aspiring CEO and is eager to make his first million. He starts on his own after ideological disputes with Sanjeev. He joins the airline business and keeps on doing well until a stock market crash almost ruins him. When under serious debt, he gets the opportunity to clear them but has to deceive his brother for that. He initially agrees but then refuses to accept the money. It is then revealed that the money is Sanjeev Arora's.

Jai is the son of a respectable cooperative bank chairman and wants to become a powerful politician; Jai joins politics against his widowed mother's will. He rapidly climbs up the party ranks, but to do so, he has to do things that are against his will but important to beat his party's opposition. He willingly lets the opposition leader die of a heart attack when he could have saved him. As a result, his mental condition is severely hampered, and he spends many sleepless nights. He then has to visit a psychiatrist. After help from his psychiatrist, he learns to get over his issues and asks for forgiveness from the opposition leader's wife to receive closure.

Ishita is the contributor of a leading gossip magazine, Scandal, and wants to make loads of cash. Following this, she traps a business tycoon named Raj Gujral with her beauty and strategy. She leaks her photos with him on the front page of Scandal. When his wife sees it, she divorces him. Raj looks forward to wooing Ishita, but she doesn't take his calls. Finally, she marries him after learning about their divorce. Over time, she realizes that she cannot find her way to receiving loyalty from Raj. And finds herself accustomed to a lifestyle, feeling trapped in it. But eventually, she gathers the guts to get over her obsession with money and divorces him.

Monica longs to hit big on the Bollywood screen. Although she has a boyfriend — Mohit Aggarwal — she has an affair with a film star called Rohit Kumar. She lies until Mohit discovers her sleeping with Rohit Kumar. Mohit commits suicide. The next day, she confesses everything in front of the media and takes all the blame for his death. She goes abroad afterward out of embarrassment.

Manish, a struggling writer, gets happily married and has a daughter. He writes the best-selling Life Mein Kabhie Kabhiee. The book was the story about the lives of the five best friends: how their lives changed and how they understood the significance of their lives.

== Cast ==
- Dino Morea as Rajeev Arora
- Aftab Shivdasani as Manish Gupta
- Anjori Alagh as Ishita Sharma / Ishita Raj Gujral
- Nauheed Cyrusi as Monica Seth
- Sameer Dattani as Jai Gokhale, who later becomes MP
- Yashpal Sharma as Minister Gwaneshwar
- Nishigandha Wad as Kanta Prasad's wife
- Madan Joshi as Chief Minister Kanta Prasad
- Anuj Sawhney as Mohit Agarwal (Monica's boyfriend)
- Mohnish Behl as Sanjiv Arora (Rajiv's elder brother)
- Koel Puri as Richa Gupta (Manish's wife)
- Raj Zutshi as Raj Gujral (Ishita's husband)
- Rajat Bedi as Rohit Kumar
- Nikita Anand as Rajiv's girlfriend
- Pinky Harwani as Jai's counsellor

== Music ==
- Hum Khushi Ki Chah Mein : Zubeen Garg
- Gehra Gehra : Sunidhi Chauhan.
- No Problem : Remo Fernandes
- Valha Valha : Shaan, Sunidhi Chauhan, Mahalaxmi Iyer, Shamit (The song is adapted from the Egyptian singer Amr Diab (El Alem Allah - album " Tamally Maak" in 2000)).
- Hum Tum Hum Tum : KK, Gayatri Iyer
- Hum Khushi Ki Chah Mein (Rock Mix) : Alka Yagnik, Zubeen Garg

== Reception ==
=== Critical reception ===
Media reviews were not positive overall. Khalid Mohamed of Hindustan Times called it "A 16-reel invitation to a serious headache", and likened it to "such an ordeal that you want to run out, tearing your hair, shouting to all who care to listen, "No, no, Is Life Mein Kabhie Nahin" (a pun on movie's name) [never in this life]. Regarding the plot, he says, "The plot limps and limps.."
