= Jai Hanuman (1997 TV series) =

Indian mythological television series

- Genre: History
- Created by: Sanjay Khan
- Written by: Dr.Madhusudan Pathak
- Directed by: Sanjay Khan
- Starring: Raj Premi
- Theme music composer: Ravindra Jain
- Country of origin: India
- Original language: Hindi
- No. of episodes: 178

Production
- Producer: Sanjay Khan
- Production company: Numero Uno International Limited

Original release
- Network: DD National
- Release: 4 March 1997 – 29 July 2000

Jai Hanuman is a 1997 Indian television series based on the life of the Hindu deity Hanuman, an avatar of Shiva, in Hindi. It was directed by Sanjay Khan. The series was initially shown on the state-run DD National, and was later shown on Sony Entertainment Television in 2008.

== Plot ==
In the Treta Yuga (3rd age), various events occur, including the defeat of demons by Lord Vishnu, which leads to the birth of positive and negative forces. One of the negative forces—the rise of demon dictator Ravana—plunges the universe into terror. The birth of God becomes necessary to eliminate the terror of Ravana, leading to the birth of two of the most powerful and mutually attached gods: Shri Rama and Hanuman, sons of Ayodhya's King Dashrath and the ape-headed King Kesari respectively. As time passes, the two meet and become close friends. Hanuman is a celibate monkey, dedicated friend, and brave warrior. Shri Ram is an ideal human being and an excellent warrior, whose love for Hanuman knows no bounds. Shri Ram asks Hanuman to perform worldly duties until the call of time. As time progresses, events described in Valmiki's Ramayan take place. During the war of Lanka, the war skills of human beings and monkeys (along with those of Shri Rama and Hanuman) lead to the end of demon warriors like Meghnad, Kumbhakarna, and Ravan. Shri Rama ultimately returns to Ayodhya, and Ramarajya comes into existence.

As time passes, friendship between Sri Rama and Hanuman grows, but after many dramatic events Shri Rama—along with his co-incarnated fellows Laxman, Sita, Shatrughna and Bharat—leaves Earth. They leave Hanuman alone to serve mankind. As time passes, the Dvapara Yuga (3rd age) arrives and Shri Rama, along with other incarnated souls, reincarnates as Shri Krishna to protect Dharma. Shri Krishna forms an alliance with Pandavas, the five Moral Brothers, against their 100 immoral cousins, the Kauravas. The third Pandava, Arjuna, is a friend and follower of Krishna. Shri Krishna makes Hanuman realise that he and his friend Shri Rama are the same, and asks him to support him in his mission Hanuman does so, and the events of Mahabharata take place. Before the war, Pandavas (on the advice of Shri Krishna) invokes Hanuman to help him in the upcoming war. Hanuman blesses them and takes a place in Arjuna's Chariot. The sermon of Bhagavad Geeta and the 18 Days Battle of Kurukshetra take place, leading to a victory for Dharma. Hanuman watches the bloodshed in silence. After many other dramatic events, the Dvapara Yuga ends and Shri Krishna leaves Earth.

As time passes, the Kali Yuga (4th age) arrives and all morality from Earth fades away. Hanuman takes the responsibility of sowing the seeds of Dharma along with spreading the fame of Sri Rama with the help of Goswami Tulsidas, who is the incarnation of Maharishi Valmiki. Goswami Tulsidas rewrites the Ramayana in the form of the Ramcharitmanas to help uplift the masses. Hanuman helps Goswami Tulsidas in every way, including helping to fade of the illusion of lust. Goswami Tulsidas and Hanuman are successful to some extent in their mission.

Tulsidas pleases Shri Rama and Lakshman and they give their Darshan, while Sita gives Darshan to Ratna, his wife. After a long period Tulsidas leaves for Vaikunth, and Hanuman carries on the responsibility of sowing the seed of morality all by himself.

== Cast ==
- Raj Premi as
  - Hanuman
  - Shiva
- Kavin Dave as
  - Child Hanuman
  - Child Ravan
- Siraj Mustafa Khan as Ram,
- Shilpa Mukherjee / Meenakshi Gupta as Sita
- Manish Khanna as
  - Lakshman
  - Arjun
- Phalguni Parekh as Añjanā
- Deepak Jethi as
  - Kesari
  - Angada
- Upasana Singh as Mohini
- Anil Varma / Premchandra Sharma as Surya
- Arup Pal as Indra
- Sharmilee Raj as Shachi
- Sagar Saini as Varuna
- Aseem Dixit as Agni
- Arif Khan as Angwahan
- Sunil Singh as
  - Vishwamitra
  - Bhishma
- Vijay Arun as Vashishtha
- Tarun Kumar as Yagyavalkya
- Pradeep Sharma as Janaka
- Deep Dhillon as Dasharatha
- Riten Mukherjee / Rahul Khetarpal as Bharat
- Hitesh Kumar / Vinod Anand as Shatrughan
- Monika / Malavika Shivpuri as Urmila
- Raji Sharma / Anita Hassanandani as Mandavi
- Samreen Naaz / Gulrez Khan as Shrutakirti
- Anil Yadav as Ravan
- Sonia Kapoor as
  - Parvati
  - Ganga
  - Mandodari
- Urmi Negi /Jaya Mathur as Shurpanakha
- Arun Mathur as
  - Shukracharya
  - Dhritrashtra
- Brownie Parashar as
  - Rahu
  - Mayasura
  - Sugriv
- Anirudh Agarwal as Shambarasur
- Roma Manek as Kaushalya
- Maya Alagh as Kaikeyi
- Mangala Kenkare as Sumitra
- Sunny Singh as Child Ram
- Deepak Beri as Child Lakshmana
- Tanmay Narvekar as Child Bharat
- Vinit Gadhia as Child Shatrughan
- Sudhir Mittoo as Vishnu
- Jaya Bhattacharya/Annapurna Vitthal Bhairi as Lakshmi
- Rohitash Gaud as Tulsidas
- Irrfan Khan / Sudhir Dalvi as Valmiki
- Mukesh Khanna as Bhagiratha
- Chand Dhar as Sumali
- Anupam Shyam as Mali
- Sunil Bob Gadhavali as Malyavan
- Nimai Bali as
  - Vayu
  - Vali
  - Duryodhan
  - Makardhwaj
- Raju Shrestha as Narad
- Rishabh Shukla as Manu
- Arun Bali as Vishrav
- Utkarsha Naik as Kaikasi
- Amit Pachori as Angad
- Deepraj Rana as
  - Nagmuni
  - Vibhishan
- Ritu Deepak as Sulochana
- Shamim Khan as
  - Bhanumati
  - Rambha
- Kumar Hegde as Vindhyanchal
- Narendra Jha as Kuber
- Ravi Kishan as Krishna
- Raman Khatri as
  - Parashuram
  - Indrajit
- Govind Khatri as Gunasundar
- Ravi Chawala as Jatayu
- Mahendra Ghule as Kumbhkaran
- Shailendra Srivastav as Ahiravan
- Ramesh Tiwari as Mahiravan
- Kali Prasad Mukherjee as
  - Shani
  - Kali
- Rahul Bhat as Sujati
- Bhavesh Vora as Pragati
- Barkha Pandit as Punjiksthala
- Naveen Bawa as Priyadhar
- Sanjay Swaraj as Himavat
- Syed Badr-ul Hasan Khan Bahadur
- Praphulla Pandey as Karna
- Rajesh Singh as Bheem
- Kaushal Kapoor as Dushasan
- Neelu Kohli as Kunti
- Vilas Raj as Kalanemi
- Vikrant Sokhi as Kuranjan
- Hemant Choudhary as Khara
- Ranjeev Verma as Dundubhi
- Dolly Bindra as Tataka
- Balwant Bansal as Matangi
- Anwar Fatehan as Agastya
- Farooq Khan as Sumant
- Sunila Karambelkar as
  - Ahalya
  - Parvati
- Shweta Rastogi as Satyabhama
- Saba as
  - Menaka
  - Mandodari
- Veena Sharma

== Production ==
Created by Sanjay Khan, the series told the saga of Hanuman chronologically over 178 episodes. Jai Hanuman starred Raj Premi as Hanuman, Siraj Mustafa Khan as Shri Ram, Irrfan Khan as Maharishi Valmiki, and Manish Khanna as Lakshman. The series was produced by Sanjay Khan's production house, Numero Uno International.
