= Sameer Nair =

Indian businessman

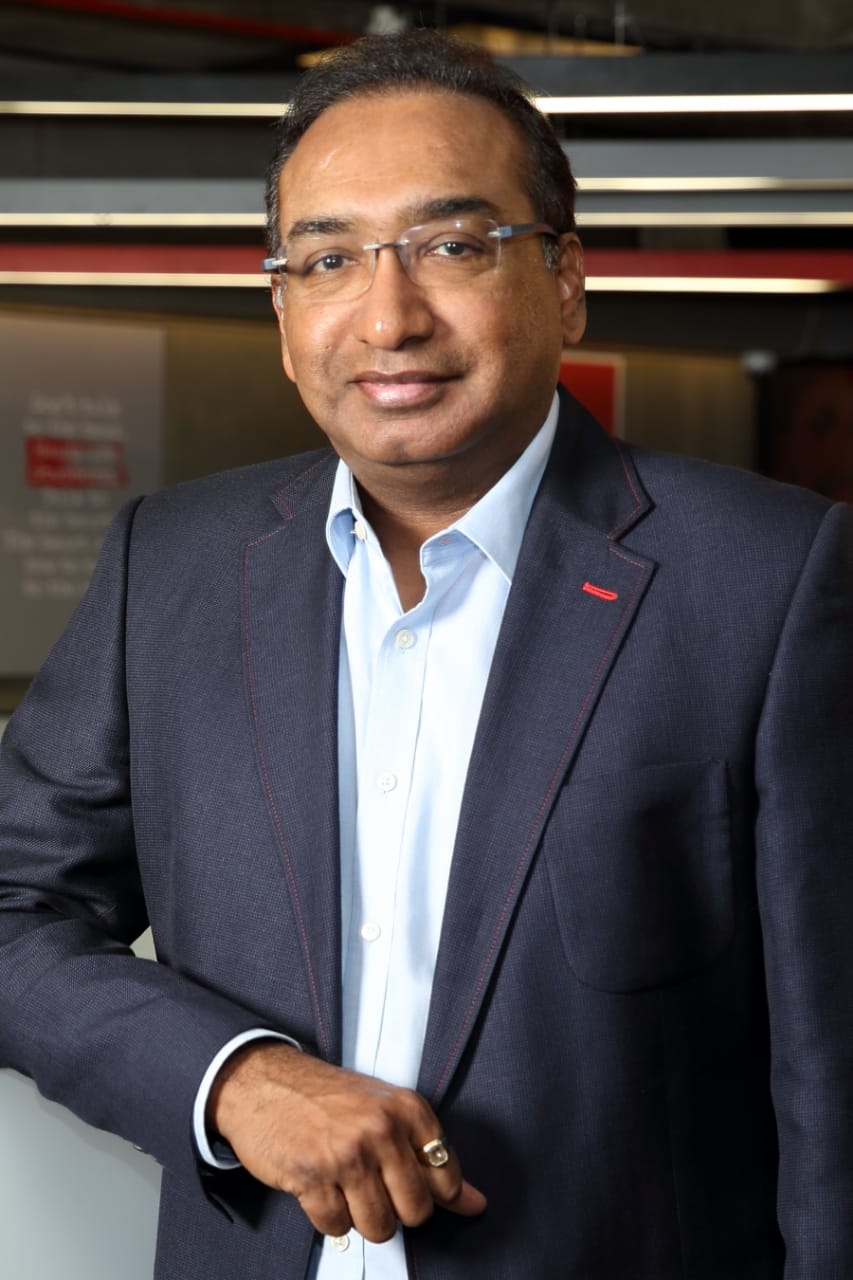
- Sameer Nair

Chief Executive Officer of STAR India Network
- Former
- In office 2000–2007

Chief Executive Officer of NDTV Imagine
- Former
- In office 2009–2011

Chief Executive Officer of Balaji Telefilms Limited
- Former
- In office 2013–2017

Chief Executive Officer of Applause Entertainment Limited
- Present
- In office 2017–Incumbent

Personal details
- Born: 3 December 1965 (age 60) Mumbai, Maharashtra, India
- Spouse: Sawari Alagh
- Relatives: Sunil Alagh (father-in-law); Maya Alagh (mother-in-law); Anjori Alagh (sister-in-law)
- Occupation: Business executive, political activist

Sameer Nair (born 1965) is an Indian media executive and CEO of Applause Entertainment Limited, a content studio owned by the Aditya Birla Group. He helped revamp the Star India, Star One, Star Utsav, Star Gold, Star Vijay, and Channel V television networks and participated in the launch of the Kaun Banega Crorepati, and Balaji Telefilms' soap operas on Star Plus.

== Early life and education ==
Nair received his Higher Secondary Certificate from Wilson High School in Mumbai. From 1982 to 1984, he studied physics at St. Xavier's College, Mumbai. He later earned his bachelor's degree in economics from the University of Madras via correspondence courses while studying hotel management at the Institute of Hotel Management, Catering Technology, and Applied Nutrition, Mumbai. Alongside these fields, he studied Indian history and politics. These interests lead him to join the Aam Aadmi Party (AAP)

== Career ==
=== Early career ===
Nair began his career in advertising and television marketing before joining Star India in the mid-1990s. He spent two years in Yellow Pages in Mumbai and four years in advertising and filmmaking with Goldwire in Chennai.

=== Star India ===
Nair entered the nascent television industry in the early 1990s with STAR India Network taking charge of Star Movies, the only English movie channel in India. Over a 12-year career at STAR India Network, he worked in acquisitions, networking, and promotions, he was also the programming head of Star Plus,Executive Vice President, and the Chief Operating Officer (overseeing Content, Communication, Advertising Sales, and Distribution) in 2002, and Chief Executive Officer in 2006. He played a central role in the launch of Kaun Banega Crorepati in 2000, hosted by Amitabh Bachchan.

Under his leadership, Star India also expanded its Hindi general entertainment portfolio, investing in long-running serials and large-scale events that consolidated its dominance in the early 2000s.

=== NDTV Imagine ===
In 2007, Nair began working with NBC Universal to establish NDTV Imagine Ltd. This corporation sought to introduce mythology and historical programming into daily primetime schedules. The channel launched with high-profile programming including a remake of Ramayan and several reality shows. While initially generating attention, the channel struggled to maintain ratings. In 2012, Turner Broadcasting announced the closure of NDTV Imagine due to financial losses.

=== Turner and Balaji Telefilms ===
Nair subsequently worked with Turner General Entertainment and later with Balaji Telefilms, where he oversaw broadcast and content strategy.

=== Applause Entertainment ===
In August 2017, Nair has served as CEO of Applause Entertainment, a content and IP creation studio backed by the Aditya Birla Group and its chairman Kumar Mangalam Birla. Under his leadership, Applause has produced a wide range of digital streaming series including Scam 1992: The Harshad Mehta Story (2020), Criminal Justice (2019–), and Avrodh (2020). Scam 1992 in particular received widespread critical acclaim, with The Indian Express describing it as "a watershed moment for Hindi streaming content that set new benchmarks for writing and performances."
