= Syed Badr-ul Hasan Khan Bahadur =

Indian actor and classical dancer (died 2019)

- Died: 5 February 2019; Mumbai, Maharashtra, India
- Other name: Pappu Polyester
- Occupations: Actor, Classical Dancer

Syed Badr-ul Hasan Khan Bahadur professionally known by Pappu Polyester was an Indian actor and classical dancer who acted in silver screen and television.

== Biography ==
Khan Bahadur was a descendant of Wajid Ali Shah. He acted in The Sword of Tipu Sultan in 1990 where he played the role of Maharaja of Mysore and won a National Film Award for Best Supporting Actor for acting in this television series. He was a part of Jodhaa Akbar where he played the role of Mulla Do-Piyaza.

Khan Bahadur was a classical dancer too. For his dancing he received an award from Birju Maharaj. He also received honorary doctorate degree in acting from Ambedkar University.

Khan Bahadur died on 5 February 2019.

== Selected filmography ==
=== Television ===
- The Sword of Tipu Sultan
- Pratigya
- Jai Hanuman
- Chandrakanta
- Om Namah Shivay
- Safar
- 1857 Kranti

=== Film ===
- Ek Nambar Kaa Chor (1990)
- Farishtay (1991)
- Yalgaar (1992)
- Khooni Dracula (1992)
- Phool Aur Angaar (1993)
- Andha Intaquam (1993)
- Teri Payal Mere Geet (1993)
- Betaaj Badshah (1994)
- Khuddar (1994)
- Hum Hain Khalnayak (1996)
- Tere Mere Sapne (1996)
- Daravani Haveli (1997)
- Jeb Katari (1997)
- Darmiyaan (1997)
- Bhayanak (1998)
- Maharaja (1998)
- Hero Hindustani (1998)
- Hindustan Ki Kasam (1999)
- Mann (1999)
- Phir Bhi Dil Hai Hindustani (2000)
- Badal (2000)
- Ittefaq (2001)
- Dil Dhoondhta Hai (2002)
- Yeh Mohabbat Hai (2002)
- Kranti (2002)
- Aap Mujhe Achche Lagne Lage (2002)
- Hamra Se Biyah Karba (2003)
- Dhund: The Fog (2004)
- Dil Ne Jise Apna Kahaa (2004)
- Bipasha: The Black Beauty (2006)
- Khoya Khoya Chand (2007)
- Jodhaa Akbar (2008)
- Indian Never Again Nirbhaya (2018)
