= Anokhi Pehchan =

- Directed by: Satyen Bose
- Starring: Sanjay Khan; Raakhee
- Music by: Kalyanji-Anandji; Anand Bakshi (lyrics)
- Release date: 20 September 1972
- Country: India
- Language: Hindi

Anokhi Pehchan is a 1972 Bollywood drama film directed by Satyen Bose. The film stars Sanjay Khan and Raakhee.

== Cast ==
- Sanjay Khan
- Raakhee
- Simi Garewal
- Nirupa Roy
- Jagdeep
- Mohan Choti

== Soundtrack ==
Song	Singer
"Tere Baba Tere Baba"	Lata Mangeshkar
"Aap Ka Shukriya"	Mohammed Rafi
"O Mr. Jolly"	Asha Bhosle
"Yeh Mera Pehla Pehla Pyar Hai"	Asha Bhosle
"Aa Rahe Ghar Mein"	Usha Khanna, Hemlata
