= Haadsa =

Haadsaa
- Directed by: Akbar Khan
- Produced by: Akbar Khan
- Starring: Akbar Khan; Ranjeeta; Smita Patil
- Cinematography: Pramod Moutho
- Edited by: Sunil
- Music by: Kalyanji-Anandji
- Production company: Akbar Arts
- Release date: 30 September 1983
- Running time: 150 minutes
- Country: India
- Language: Hindi

Haadsaa (transl. Accident) is a 1983 Indian Hindi-language action thriller film directed and produced by Akbar Khan. The film stars Khan, Ranjeeta, Smita Patil, Naseeruddin Shah, Amrish Puri as main characters. The music was composed by Kalyanji-Anandji.

== Story ==
Asha lives a poor lifestyle with her parents in Bombay. When her mother passes away, her dad turns to alcohol in a big way, and also brings home her stepmother, who is also an alcoholic and dislikes Asha. When Asha befriends Guddu, she throws him out of the house. In anger, Asha pushes her down the stairs and kills her. When she grows up, her father sells her to R.K. Chakravarty for a suitcase full of cash. Chakravarty marries her, but she remains frustrated, as he is impotent, incapable of loving her. Then she gets a parrot as a pet. When the parrot attempts to fly away, she clips its wings. When her car breaks down, she has it serviced at Auto Services, and when motor mechanic, Jaikumar Sharma, returns it to her house, she thinks her friend Guddu has returned, seduces and has sex with Jai. She frequently breaks her car down, and asks Jai to repair it, but he refuses to go along with her seductions. When she finds out that he has fallen in love with a girl named Robby, she decides to do away with her - and whoever else attempts to stand in her and Jai's way.

== Cast ==
- Ashok Kumar as Dr. Ved Kapoor
- Akbar Khan as Jai Kumar Sharma
- Ranjeeta as Robby Kapoor
- Smita Patil as Asha
- Naseeruddin Shah as Gangster
- Amrish Puri as R. K. Chakravarty
- Helen as Martha
- Jalal Agha as Lorry Driver
- Bob Christo as Robby's Abductor
- Iftekhar as Police Inspector
- Jagdeep as Anthony Gonsalves
- Mac Mohan as Gangster's Goon
- Master Ravi as Guddu
- Rahul Dev as Bakhtavar
- Akash Khurana as Bade Miyan

== Music ==
Song	Singer
"Yeh Bombay Shahar Hai"	Amit Kumar
"Pyar Ka Haadsaa"	Amit Kumar
"Y O G A"	Amit Kumar
"Tu Kya Jaane"	Kishore Kumar
"Yeh Vaada Karo, Na Rougi Tum, Agar Ho Bhi Jaun Main"	Kishore Kumar, Asha Bhosle
"Haiyo Rabba"	Kanchan
"Zindagi Yeh Zindagi"	Anand Kumar
