= Kala Dhanda Goray Log =

1986 film by Sanjay Khan

- Poster
- Directed by: Sanjay Khan
- Screenplay by: Laxmikant Sharma; Rahi Masoom Reza (dialogue)
- Story by: Sanjay Khan
- Produced by: Shapoor R. Katrak
- Starring: Sunil Dutt; Sanjay Khan; Anita Raj; Akbar Khan; Amrita Singh
- Cinematography: V. Subbarao
- Edited by: Vijay Pande
- Music by: Laxmikant–Pyarelal; Louis Banks; Anand Bakshi (lyrics)
- Release date: 19 May 1986 (India)
- Country: India
- Language: Hindi

Kala Dhanda Goray Log (transl. Fair People, Black Deeds) is a 1986 Hindi-language action thriller film directed by Sanjay Khan, starring Sunil Dutt, Sanjay Khan, Anita Raj, Akbar Khan and Amrita Singh. The film's music was composed by Louis Banks and Laxmikant–Pyarelal, while the lyrics were written by Anand Bakshi. The film was shot at Chandivali Studio and Film City in Bombay. This was Sanjay Khan's last leading role in films, before he shifted to television, acting and directing TV series like The Sword of Tipu Sultan (1990).

== Cast ==
- Sunil Dutt as Gauri Shankar / Michael
- Sanjay Khan as Raja
- Anita Raj as Sandhya
- Akbar Khan as Ramu
- Amrita Singh as Mrs. Ramola Gauri Shankar / Pooja
- Saeed Jaffrey as Pinto Ustad
- Sujit Kumar as Inspector Shiva Singh
- Shreeram Lagoo as Haji Irshad Patel
- Shafi Inamdar as Advocate Abdul Rahim Khan
- Bob Christo as Bob
- Mohan Agashe as Custom Officer Sudarshan Kumar (as Dr. Mohan Agase)
- Sushma Seth as Mrs. Durga Das Jetia
- Leena Das
- Anupam Kher as Durga Das Jetia
- Shammi Kapoor (Special Appearance)
- Bharat Bhushan as Maharaj
- Satyen Kappu as I.G.P. Shukla
- Sudhir Dalvi as Police Inspector
- Sulochana Latkar as Badi Maa
- Jeevan as Kidnapper
- Yunus Parvez as Chaman
- Ramesh Deo as Gauri Shankar's Neighbor
- Imtiaz Khan as Upadhyaay
- Subbiraj as Police Commissioner
- Deepika Chikhalia as Terisa (Guest Role)
- Mohan Sherry
- Razzak Khan as Jabba

== Soundtrack ==
The music of the film was given by Louis Banks and Laxmikant–Pyarelal, while the lyrics were by Anand Bakshi. It also featured a qawwali, Allah Hoo Allah Hoo, for which veteran actor Shammi Kapoor made a guest appearance.

#	Title	Singer(s)
1	"Jab Jab Kisi Ladake Ko Kisi Ladaki Se"	Shabbir Kumar, Anuradha Paudwal
2	"Sha Shangrila"	Annette Pinto
3	"Ye Dastoor Hai Hazoor Kisi Ka Kya Kasoor..."	S. Janaki
4	"Bul Bul Ye Desh Paraya Hai"	Shabbir Kumar
5	"Allah Hoo Allah Hoo"	Mohammed Aziz
