= Sub Ka Saathi =

1972 film directed by A. Bhimsingh

- Directed by: A. Bhimsingh
- Starring: Vinod Khanna; Rakhee Gulzar; Sanjay Khan; Bharathi Vishnuvardhan
- Release date: 1972
- Country: India
- Language: Hindi

Sub Ka Saathi is a 1972 Bollywood drama film directed by A. Bhimsingh. The film stars The film stars Vinod Khanna, Rakhee Gulzar and Sanjay Khan.

== Plot ==
A family social film, strongly advocating national integration and economic equality, it tells of a millionaire's son, brought up by a Harijan (untouchable) couple, fighting against the evil machinations of his wealthy father to provide his kin the promised "uptopia" and also make his father repent for the manner in which he amassed his wealth.

== Cast ==
- Sanjay Khan as Amrit
- Vinod Khanna as Amar
- Rakhee Gulzar as Rosy
- Bharthi as Chitra
- Om Prakash as Seth Maya Das
- Sulochna as Amar Mother
- David as Victor

== Soundtrack ==
- Yeh Waada karo Bagh Mein Na Aaya Karoge – Kishore Kumar
- Yeh Jaan Lo Pehchaan Lo Kaun Paraya Hai – Mohammed Rafi
- Dil To Dil Hai Sheesha To Nahin – Lata Mangeshkar
- Woh Aaye, Woh Baithe – Lata Mangeshkar
