= Dillagi (1966 film) =

Dillagi (1996 film)
- Directed by: Shanu Banerjee
- Screenplay by: Mushtaq Jalili
- Story by: Mehmood Lucknavi
- Produced by: Tony Walker
- Starring: Mala Sinha; Sanjay Khan
- Music by: Laxmikant-Pyarelal
- Release date: 1966
- Country: India
- Language: Hindi

Dillagi (Hindi: दिल्लगी, translation: Infatuation) is a 1966 Bollywood film starring Mala Sinha and Sanjay Khan in lead roles.

The film was produced by Tony Walker, directed by Shanu Banerjee (S. Banerjee), with screenplay and dialogues by Mushtaq Jalili, story by Mehmood Lucknavi, lyrics by Majrooh Sultanpuri and music by Laxmikant-Pyarelal.

== Plot ==
Seema (Mala Sinha) lives with her parents. One day she meets Sapan (Sanjay Khan) in a club, when his friend Deepak (Vijay Kumar) tries to make them fall in love with each other. Deepak's plan doesn't work and Sapan cautions him, that love cannot be contrived, but Deepak doesn't listen and sends a love letter to Seema in Sapan's name. Seema is furious on receiving the letter and insults Sapan in the club, in front of many people. Sapan vows revenge, and says he will make Seema fall in love with him, while he will fake it.

Sapan and Deepak enlist the help of Professor B.N.R. Choubey (Johnny Walker who plays Pyarelal, in disguise) but Seema catches on to the plan. She doesn't let Sapan know that she is aware, while their respective parents arrange their marriage, thinking they really love each other. Seema is unhappy with the development and lets Sapan know she doesn't love him, even though Sapan has really fallen for her.

There are also two sub-plots of Pyarelal pursuing Usha (Bela Bose) and Deepak being in love with a girl he sees by the lake, Lajwanti.

Some misunderstandings clear up, Seema and Sapan are happy and in love. However, Sapan's unwell father Rai Sahab, who was blackmailed by a shady character Puran (Keshav rana), dies soon. Sapan is asked to take care of Lajwanti after his father's death, which leads many to think he has got a mistress.

What is Lajwanti's truth? What happens when Seema and Deepak hear the rumours about Sapan and Lajwanti? How does everything clear up so the couples are reunited, forms the rest of the story.

== Cast ==
- Mala Sinha as Seema
- Sanjay Khan as Sapan
- Vijay Kumar as Deepak
- Nazima as Lajwanti
- Praveen Paul as Seema's mother
- Gajanan Jagirdar as Rai Sahab (Sapan's Father)
- Johnny Walker as Pyarelal / Professor B. N. R. Chaubey
- Bela Bose as Usha
- Tuntun as Usha's Sister
- Keshav Rana as Puran Bahadur

== Songs ==
All lyrics are written by Majrooh Sultanpuri; all music is composed by Laxmikant Pyarelal.

Songs in Dillagi
No.	Title	Singer(s)	Length
1.	"Poochho To Naam Bhi Apna Bata Sakte"	Mohammed Rafi
2.	"Ab Jeene Ka Mausam"	Mohammed Rafi, Asha Bhosle
3.	"Mere Dil Par Chal Rahe Hain"	Lata Mangeshkar
4.	"Hun Jee Lenge Bin Tumhare, Kyunki Tum"	Mukesh, Lata Mangeshkar
5.	"Tauba Ye Nazare, Ye Katil Ishare"	Mohammed Rafi
6.	"Dupatta Odhe Nikle Bahara"	Mohammed Rafi
7.	"Ye Aaj Kal Ke Ladke"	Usha Mangeshkar

Note: One more song is not in the film, but was part of the album - "Kya Kahoo Aaj Kya Baat Hai" (sung by Lata Mangeshkar).
