= Mushtaq Jalili =

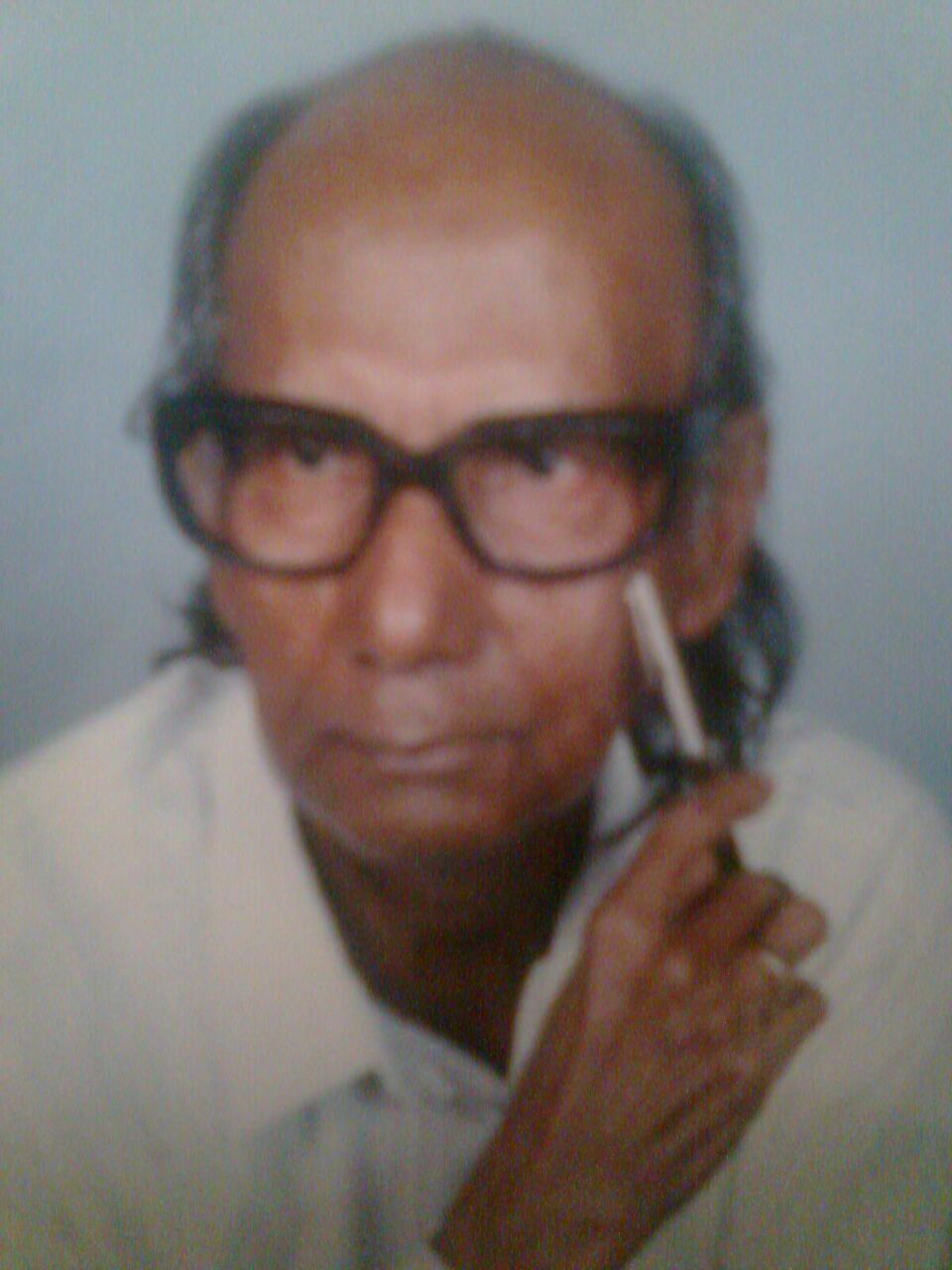

Mushtaq Jalili (27 October 1927—14 October 2004) was an Indian screenwriter.

He was born in Hyderabad, the son of Urdu poet Fasahat Jung Jaleel (Jaleel Manikpuri). He first worked with A.R. Kardar as an assistant story writer, then in 1955 as an assistant writer in the story department under P.N. Arora. Following that he worked as an assistant writer with Pandit Mukhram Sharma.

In 1963 he wrote the films Kaun Apna Kaun Paraya and Begaana. He wrote dialogue for K.C. Gulati's Mohabbat Zindagi Hai (1966), screenplay and dialogue for Dillagi (1966), screenplay for Ek Phool Do Mali (1969), and story and screenplay for Pyaar Ka Rishta (1973).

Jalili also wrote the script for Dharkan (1972), Do Musafir (1978), and Mr. Phandebaaz (1995), and the dialogue for Bonny (1990), and Safari (1999).

Jalili died in Mumbai on 14 October 2014.
