= Anand Sagar =

Park in Shegaon, Maharashtra, India

Coordinates: 20.7756°N 76.6937°E

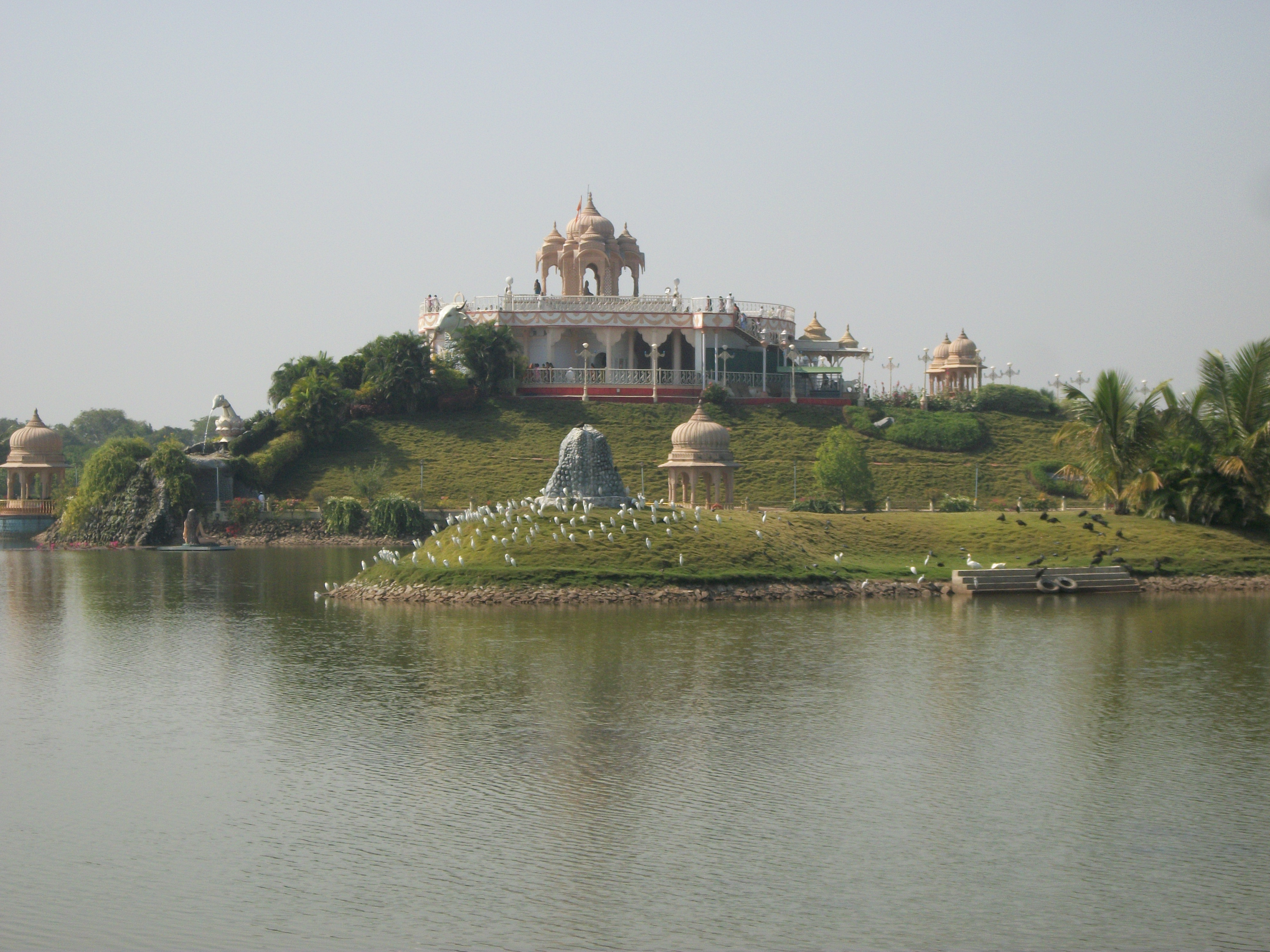
Anand Sagar and surrounding lake

Anand Sagar is a building complex, lake, and tourist attraction in Shegaon, Maharashtra. The site was built in 2005 by the Shri Gajanan Maharaj Mandir Trust to solve local water resource issues, and has since become a tourist attraction and pilgrimage site.

== Description ==
The complex at Anand Sagar was constructed by the Shri Gajanan Maharaj Mandir Trust as a means to create jobs in Shegaon, bring in tourist revenue, and provide reliable access to water. The project had an initial budget of ₹300 crore.

The site consists of an artificial lake and a number of buildings. Buildings present include gardens, entertainment buildings, an amphitheater, and temples. The lake was made by drawing water from a nearby river and allows Shegaon to better manage water resources.

Anand Sagar was used as a model by several other complexes in India.
