= Sadashiv =

Sadashiv may refer to:

- Anant Sadashiv Altekar (1898–1960), historian, archaeologist, and numismatist from Maharashtra, India
- Sadashiv Amrapurkar (1950–2014), Indian actor, best known in Marathi and Hindi films during 1983 to 1999
- Sadashiv Rao Bhau (1730–1761), son of Chimaji Appa and Rakhmabai and the nephew of Peshwa Baji Rao I
- Sadashiv Datar (born 1885), Indian long-distance runner
- Govind Sadashiv Ghurye (1893–1983), Indian professor of sociology
- Madhav Sadashiv Golwalkar, the second Sarsanghchalak of the Rashtriya Swayamsevak Sangh
- Sadashiv Vasantrao Gorakshkar, Indian writer, art critic, museologist
- Madhav Sadashiv Gore (1921–2010), Indian social scientist, writer, vice-chancellor of Jawaharlal Nehru University, Delhi
- Narayan Sadashiv Hosmane, Indian-born cancer research scientist, research professor of Chemistry and Biochemistry
- Sadashiv Iyer (born 1972), Indian former first class cricketer
- Pandurang Sadashiv Khankhoje (1884–1967), Indian revolutionary, scholar, agricultural scientist and historian
- Vishnu Sadashiv Kokje, the Governor of Himachal Pradesh, India, from 2003 to 2008
- Sadashiv Lokhande, member of the 16th Lok Sabha of India
- Sadashiv Kanoji Patil (1898–1981), former Congress leader from Maharashtra
- Sadashiv Patil (born 1933), former Indian cricketer
- Anant Sadashiv Patwardhan, Indian politician from the state of the Madhya Pradesh
- Vasant Sadashiv Pradhan (1914–2002), Bharatiya Jan Sangh politician from Madhya Pradesh
- Karnad Sadashiv Rao (1881–1937), Indian freedom fighter from Karnataka, India
- Malhar Sadashiv (1912–1997), Indian industrialist
- Pandurang Sadashiv Sane (1899–1950), Marathi author, teacher, social activist and freedom fighter
- Sadashiv Shinde (1923–1955), Indian cricketer
- Bhaskar Sadashiv Soman (born 1913 in Gwalior), Indian naval officer in command of the Indian Navy 1962–1966

== See also ==
- Sadashiv Pethi literature, term used to criticize mainstream Marathi literature
- Sadashiv Peth, Pune, area located in Pune City, in Maharashtra State, India
- Ekta Jeev Sadashiv, 1972 Marathi film directed by Govind Kulkarni and starring Dada Kondke and Usha Chavan
- Sadashivgad
