= Trimurti (1974 film) =

- Directed by: Rajendra Bhatia
- Written by: K. P. Kottarakkara
- Produced by: Rajendra Bhatia
- Starring: Sanjay Khan; Parveen Babi; Rakesh Roshan
- Cinematography: Krishan Saigal
- Edited by: Nand Kumar
- Music by: R. D. Burman
- Release date: 1 August 1974
- Country: India
- Language: Hindi

Trimurti is a 1974 Hindi crime movie produced and directed by Rajendra Bhatia. The film stars Sanjay Khan, Parveen Babi, Rakesh Roshan and Asrani in lead roles. The film's music is by R. D. Burman.

== Synopsis ==
Vijay, Nandu, and Bhola are unemployed and live in a small town with their mother Kalyani. Nandu is a big trouble maker. One day Jagannath is murdered in his own house. Nandu is deemed the prime suspect for the murder. Police picks up the case and soon finds evidence that makes it more difficult to determine who exactly is responsible for Jagannath's death.

== Cast ==
- Sanjay Khan as Vijay
- Parveen Babi as Sunita
- Rakesh Roshan as Nandu
- Asrani as Bhola
- Bipin Gupta as Swami Ji
- A. K. Hangal as Jagannath
- I. S. Johar as Shadilal
- Arvind Trivedi as Balraam (Jagannath's Brother)
- Keshto Mukherjee as Bewda
- Achala Sachdev as Kalyani

== Music ==
=== Track listing ===
All lyrics are written by Gulshan Bawra; all music is composed by R.D. Burman.

No.	Title	Singer(s)	Length
1.	"Ab Rahoge Tum Apne Hi Bas Men"	Asha Bhosle	3:03
2.	"Daulat Ke Rang Hazar Hain"	Asha Bhosle, Manna Dey	3:29
3.	"Hum To Hain Darshan Abhilashi"	Kishore Kumar, Manna Dey	2:57
4.	"Milegi Ek Nai Zindagi Milegi"	Kishore Kumar, Lata Mangeshkar	3:25
5.	"O Maa O Maa"	Kishore Kumar, Bhupinder Singh (musician), Nitin Mukesh	3:29
6.	"Trimurti (Title Music)"	R.D. Burman	2:23
Total length:			18:46
