= Kali Basti =

- Directed by: Sudesh Issar
- Produced by: Satish Khanna
- Starring: Shatrughan Sinha; Reena Roy
- Music by: Laxmikant–Pyarelal
- Release date: 1 January 1985
- Country: India
- Language: Hindi

Kali Basti is a 1985 Indian Hindi-language film directed by Sudesh Issar and produced by Satish Khanna. It stars Shatrughan Sinha and Reena Roy in pivotal roles.

== Cast ==
- Shatrughan Sinha as Karan Singh
- Reena Roy as Lajjo
- Vijayendra Ghatge as Inspector Raghuvanshi
- Prem Chopra as Kuber
- Goga Kapoor as Panna
- Sujit Kumar as Police Inspector
- Om Prakash as Peter Pereira
- Shammi as Mary Pereira
- Bhagwan Dada as Pandu

== Soundtrack ==
Lyrics: Anjaan

Song	Singer
"Kabhi Bole Haan, Kabhi Na, Kya Karun Rama"	Asha Bhosle, Suresh Wadkar
"Kis Vaid Ko Nabs Dikhaun, Ke Haay Mujhe Kya Ho Gaya"	Mohammed Rafi, Anuradha Paudwal
"Aaj Peete Hain, Kal Peena Chhod Denge"	Mahendra Kapoor, Manhar Udhas
"Aaj Peete Hain, Kal Peena Chhod Denge" (Sad)	Mahendra Kapoor
