= Sanjay Khan =

Indian actor, producer, director (born 1941)

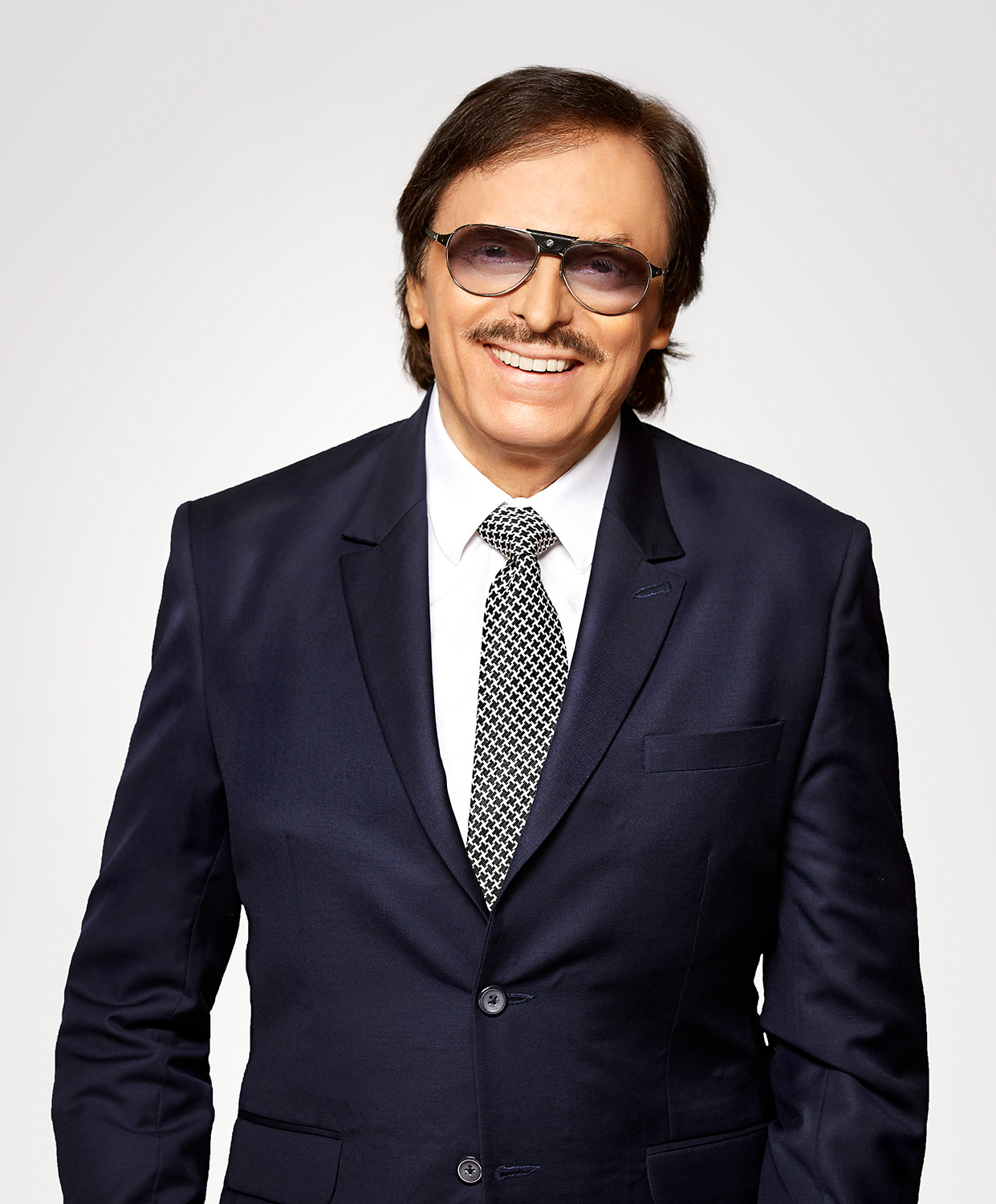
- Sanjay Khan in 2018
- Born: Shah Abbas Ali Khan; 3 January 1940 (age 86); Bangalore, Kingdom of Mysore, British India (present-day Karnataka, India)
- Years active: 1964–2007
- Spouses: Zarin Katrak (Zarine Khan) (m. 1966; died 2025) Zeenat Aman (m. 1978; ann. 1979)
- Children: 4, including Sussanne and Zayed
- Relatives: Feroz Khan (older brother); Akbar Khan (younger brother); Fardeen Khan (paternal nephew)
- Website: sanjaykhanofficial.com

Sanjay Khan (born as Shah Abbas Ali Khan, 3 January 1940) is an Indian actor, businessman, producer and director known for his works in Hindi films and television. Sanjay Khan made his debut in Rajshri film Dosti (1964), which won the National Film Award for Best Feature Film in Hindi for that year, followed by Chetan Anand's Haqeeqat (1964).

Sanjay Khan starred in a series of hit movies like Dus Lakh (1966), Ek Phool Do Mali (1969), Intaquam (1969), Dhund (1973) etc. He co-starred with his elder brother Feroz Khan in the films Upaasna (1971), Mela (1971) and Nagin (1976). He later turned producer and director with the films like Chandi Sona (1977) and Abdullah (1980). In 1990, he starred in and directed the famous historical drama television series The Sword of Tipu Sultan.

== Early life ==
Sanjay Khan was born on 3 January 1940 as Shah Abbas Ali Khan in Bangalore, Kingdom of Mysore, British India (now in Karnataka, India) into a Muslim family. Born to an immigrant Afghan father, Sadiq Ali Khan from Ghazni and a mother of Persian ancestry, Bibi Fatima Begum.

He had five brothers and two sisters, Dilshad and Khurshid. His elder brother Feroz Khan was a well-known actor and produced successful films like Dharmatma and Qurbani. His younger brothers Sameer and Shahrukh are businessmen, while Akbar Khan has made magnum opus Taj Mahal: An Eternal Love Story.

At the age of 12, Khan was taken to a theatre to see Raj Kapoor's Awaara and was mesmerised by the film. Following the film, he decided to visit with the actors. The manager of the theatre took Khan into the projection room and explained to him how the film is made. To Khan, that was a moment of epiphany and he decided to pursue an acting career. He obtained Senior Cambridge through Cambridge School in Daryaganj, New Delhi.

Deciding not to pursue further education, Khan moved to Mumbai where, before joining Hindi Cinema, he assisted John Guillermin, Hollywood film director for the MGM Production of Tarzan Goes to India (1962) which starred his brother Feroz in a supporting role and Sanjay also appeared in a small role as a pilot.

== Career ==
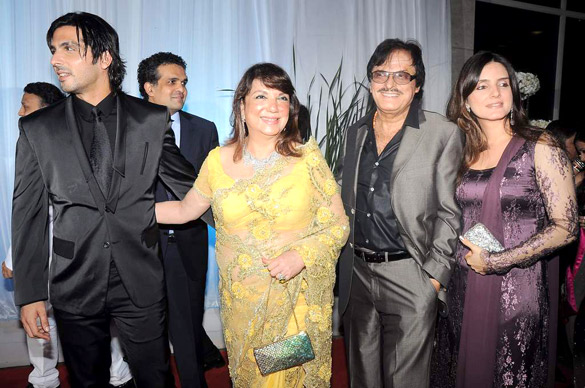
Khan (second from right) with wife Zarine (second from left), son Zayed Khan (extreme left) and daughter Simone (extreme right) at the wedding of Esha Deol in 2012

Khan made his debut in Chetan Anand's 1964 war film Haqeeqat in a small role as a soldier. Later that year, he played a pivotal supporting role in the big blockbuster film Dosti. He went on to star in hit films like Dus Lakh (1966), Ek Phool Do Mali (1969), Intaqam (1969), Shart (1969), Mela (1971), Upaasna (1971), Dhund (1973) and Nagin (1976). In 1977, he made his directorial debut with Chandi Sona starring himself, Parveen Babi and Raj Kapoor. In 1980, he directed and starred in Abdullah alongside Raj Kapoor and Zeenat Aman. He made his last film appearance in the 1986 film Kala Dhanda Goray Log, which was his third and last film as a director.

He shifted his focus on television in the late 1980s, directing and starring in the big-budget historical television drama series The Sword of Tipu Sultan. During the making of the series in 1989, a fire broke out on the sets and killed more than 40 crew members and Khan suffered 65% burns to his body. He recovered after 72 surgeries and production on the series resumed later that year with him and his brother Akbar Khan jointly directing episodes of the series. The series first aired on DD National from 1990 to 1991 and lasted 60 episodes. This would be his final acting role but he went on to produce and direct several other popular television series like The Great Maratha, Jai Hanuman and 1857 Kranti.

== Awards ==
- Uttar Pradesh Film journalists Association Award (1981)
- Andhra Pradesh journalist award (1986)
- The Gem of India Award for Excellence (1993)
- The Rajiv Gandhi Excellence Award (1993)
- The Udyog Ratna Gold Medal Award (1994)
- The Aashirwad Award (1994).
- The Arch of Excellence Award (1994)
- National Citizen's Award (1994)
- The Glory of India Award (1995)
- The Super Achiever of India Award (1995)
- Hind Gaurav Award (1997)
- Kashi Pandit Sansad Award (1997)
- Business Initiation Development Award (1997)
- Honour of Lifetime Achiever Award (1997)
- Achiever of Millennium Award (1999)
- The Millennium Achievers (2000)
- American Federation of Muslims of Indian Origin (2006)
- The Lifetime Achievement Award by Screen Star (2009)
- Biographer of the year award from Power Brands at BFJA (Bollywood Film Journalist's Awards) (2019)

== Resort ==
In 1997, he launched his dream project – the five-star deluxe Golden Palms Hotel and Spa in Bangalore. He completed this 150-room hotel with built up area of approximately 300,000 sq ft, with the largest swimming pool ever built in India containing 300,000 litres of water. Golden Palms Hotel and Spa was conceived, designed, constructed was owned by him till 2010; his wife Zarine Khan designed the interiors.

== Personal life ==
He was married to Zarine Katrak, they had three daughters and a son. Their eldest daughter Farah Khan Ali was formerly married to DJ Aqeel for 24 years, their second daughter Simone Arora married Ajay Arora and they own D'decor, while their youngest daughter is Sussanne Khan was formerly married to actor Hrithik Roshan for 14 years. Their son is a former actor Zayed Khan, who married Malaika Parekh. Sanjay Khan is an ardent follower of Lord Hanuman.

=== Domestic violence allegations ===
In 1978, Khan married actress Zeenat Aman, while he was already married to Katrak. The marriage with Aman was annulled in 1979, after Khan beat and physically assaulted her in a hotel room, resulting in many injuries, particularly to her right eye. The incident was witnessed by his wife, who allegedly joined him and cheered him on to keep beating Aman. The incident left Aman with a lazy eye (ptosis), and she later stated that she pretends it never happened.

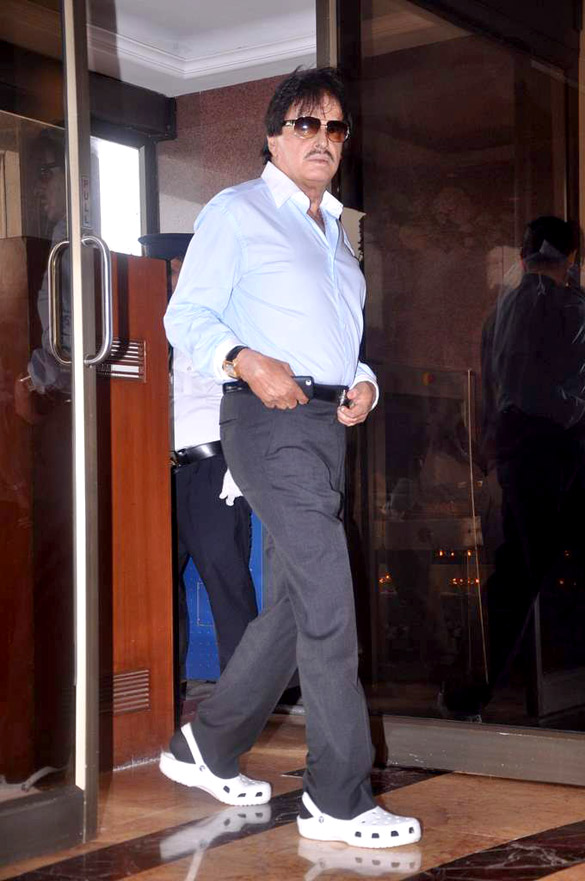
Sanjay Khan at Rajesh Khanna prayer meet

=== Fire accident ===
A major fire accident took place on 8 February 1989 in the Premier Studios of Mysore where the serial The Sword of Tipu Sultan was being shot. Loose wiring and the absence of ventilators were further causes for the fire to spread.Instead of fire-proofing material, the walls had gunny bags and the temperature rose to around 120 °C (248 °F) because of huge lights being used. All these factors contributed to the massive fire, and the final death toll was 52. Khan suffered major burns and had to spend 13 months in hospital and undergo 73 surgeries.

== Books launched ==
=== Autobiography ===
In 2018, he announced that he signed a deal with Penguin Books to release his autobiography titled The Best Mistakes of My Life and same year announced that he will build a theme park in Agra.

=== Assalamualaikum Watan ===
In 2020, he launched his second and last book "Assalamualaikum Watan".

== Filmography ==
=== Actor ===
List of Sanjay Khan film credits
Year	Title	Role	Notes
1962	Tarzan Goes to India	Pilot	Acting debut
1964	Dosti	Ashok	
1964	Haqeeqat	Indian Soldier	Based on 1962 Sino-Indian War
1966	Dus Lakh	Kishore	First lead role
1966	Dillagi	Sapan	
1967	Dil Ne Pukara	Ramesh / Rajan	
1967	Milan Ki Raat	Shankar	
1968	Abhilasha	Arun Singh	
1969	Beti	Dr. Rajesh Anand	
1969	Ek Phool Do Mali	Amar Kumar	
1969	Shart	Raj	
1969	Madhavi	Senapati Jai Singh	
1969	Intaquam	Rajpal "Raju"	
1970	Saas Bhi Kabhi Bahu Thi	Deepak Chaudhary "Deepu"	
1970	Pushpanjali	Dinesh Khanna	
1970	Maharaja	Mohan / Maharaja	
1971	Haseenon Ka Devata	Jai	
1971	Upaasna	Mohan	
1971	Mela	Kishan Singh / Kanhaiya	
1971	Woh Din Yaad Karo	Ajay / Raja	
1972	Chori Chori	Raja	
1972	Wafaa	Shyam Thakur	
1972	Sub Ka Saathi	Amrit / Ramu	
1972	Dharkan	Suraj Prakash	
1972	Babul Ki Galiyaan	Sudheer	
1972	Anokhi Pehchan		
1973	Dhund	Advocate Suresh Saxena	
1973	Sone Ke Haath	Vijay Khanna	
1973	Daaman Aur Aag	Raja	
1974	Asliyat		
1974	Trimurti	Vijay	
1974	Zindagi Ki Raahen		Unreleased film
1974	Duniya Ka Mela	Shyam / Munna	
1976	Nagin	Suraj	
1977	Mera Vachan Geeta Ki Kasam	Hari Singh / Rahim Khan	
1977	Mastan Dada	Narendra	
1977	Chandi Sona	Mayur	Also director
1980	Qurbani	Narrator	
1980	Abdullah	Sheikh Mohammed Al-Qamaal	Also director
1983	Jalwa		Unreleased film
1986	Kala Dhanda Goray Log	Raja	Also Director
1988	Akarshan	Himself	Cameo
1989	Chingari	Inspector Mohan	Filmed in 1971; Delayed release

=== Television ===
List of Sanjay Khan television credits
Year	Title	Character	Actor	Producer	Director	Year completed
1990–1991	The Sword of Tipu Sultan	Tipu Sultan	Yes	Yes	Yes	1991
1994	The Great Maratha		No	Yes	Yes	1994
1997–2000	Jai Hanuman		No	Yes	Yes	2000
2001–2002	Jai Mahabharat		No	Yes	Yes	2002
2002–2003	1857 Kranti		No	Yes	Yes	2003
2003	Maharathi Karna		No	Yes	Yes	2003

=== Director ===
- Maharathi Karna (2003) TV series
- 1857 Kranti (2002–2003) TV series
- Jai Mahabharat (2001–2002) TV series
- Jai Hanuman (1997–2000) TV series
- The Great Maratha (1994) TV series
- The Sword of Tipu Sultan (1990–1991) TV series
- Kala Dhanda Goray Log (1986)
- Abdullah (1980)
- Chandi Sona (1977)

=== Producer ===
- Maharathi Karna (2003) TV series
- 1857 Kranti (2002–2003) TV series
- Jai Mahabharat (2001–2002) TV series
- Jai Hanuman (1997–2000) TV series
- The Great Maratha (1994) TV series
- The Sword of Tipu Sultan (1990–1991) TV series
- Kala Dhanda Goray Log (1986)
- Abdullah (1980)
- Chandi Sona (1977)

=== Scripting ===
- Maharathi Karna (2003) TV series
- 1857 Kranti (2002–2003) TV series
- Jai Mahabharat (2001–2002) TV series
- Jai Hanuman (1997–2000) TV series
- The Great Maratha (1994) TV series
- The Sword of Tipu Sultan (1990–1991) TV series
- Kala Dhanda Goray Log (1986)
- Abdullah (1980)
- Chandi Sona (1977)
