= The Sword of Tipu Sultan =

Indian television series

- DVD cover of The Sword of Tipu Sultan
- Created by: Numero Uno International
- Based on: The Sword of Tipu Sultan by Bhagwan Gidwani
- Written by: Bhagwan Gidwani
- Directed by: Sanjay Khan and Akbar Khan
- Starring: Sanjay Khan; Malvika Tiwari; Maya Alagh; Deepika Chikhalia; Anant Mahadevan; Mukesh Rishi; Shahbaz Khan
- Composer: Naushad
- Country of origin: India
- Original languages: Hindustani; Hindi; Urdu
- No. of episodes: 60

Production
- Producer: Sanjay Khan
- Production locations: Premiere Studio; Mysore
- Cinematography: Basheer Ali
- Running time: approximately 45 minutes

Original release
- Network: DD National
- Release: 25 February 1990 – 14 April 1991

The Sword of Tipu Sultan is a fictional semi historical drama that was first broadcast on the DD National in February 1990. Based on a novel by Bhagwan Gidwani, this drama is a fictional portrayal of the life and times of Tipu Sultan, the 18th century ruler of Mysore. While the series was widely praised for its casting and grandeur, it also attracted wide criticism for whitewashing the history and misrepresenting Tipu Sultan as a benevolent and tolerant ruler.

== Production ==
The television drama was produced by the company Numero Uno International owned by movie director and producer Sanjay Khan. Akbar Khan, Sanjay Khan's brother, directed the first 20 episodes over a span of 18 months. The remaining episodes were directed by Sanjay Khan, and he also played the leading role of Tipu Sultan. A total of 52 episodes were shot, some of them in the Premier Studios in Mysore, Karnataka. Whereas, the music was composed by legendary Naushad and was photographed by Basheer Ali.

The series is based on a novel of the same name, written by the Montreal-based author Bhagwan S Gidwani. The novel was a best-seller, having sold about 200,000 copies, translated into many languages and reprinted in 44 editions. Gidwani also wrote the screenplay and script for the 60 episodes. The last few episodes were shot after the fire accident, a few years later.

== Cast ==
- Sanjay Khan as Tipu Sultan
  - Swapnil Joshi as Child Tipu Sultan
  - Kirran Khanna as Young Tipu Sultan
- Shahbaz Khan as Hyder Ali
- Deepika Chikhalia as Tipu's mother
- Maya Alagh as Tipu's grandmother
- Malvika Tiwari as Rukaiya, Tipu's wife
- Seema Kelkar as Saida
- Syed Badr-ul Hasan Khan Bahadur as Maharaja of Mysore
- Shashi Sharma as Maharani of Mysore
- Ananth Narayan Mahadevan as Diwan Pandit Purnaiah
- Mukesh Rishi as Mir Sadiq
- Radhakrishna Dutta as Balkrishna
- Arun Mathur as Nizam Ali Khan
- Sudhir Kulkarni as Nana Phadnavis
- Tom Alter as Richard Wellesley, 1st Marquess Wellesley
- Bob Christo as General Matthews
- Keith Stevenson as Lord Cornwallis
- Kanwaljeet Singh as Ikram Mulla Khan
- Kunickaa Sadanand as Yasmin, wife of Ikram Mulla Khan
- Shreeram Lagoo as Shivji
- Satyen Kappu as Mir Sayyed
- Sudhir Pandey as General Shiekh Ayyaz
- Navtej Hundal as Nanjanath
- Rana Jung Bahadur as Devaraj
- Jaspal Sandhu as Ahmad Shah Bahadur
- Santosh Gupta as Ramachandran, childhood friend of Hyder Ali
- Suraj Thapar as Shahbaz Ali, Hyder Ali's elder brother

== Broadcast ==
The drama was first telecast in Hindi on the Doordarshan channel in February 1990. It was dubbed into Telugu and broadcast on ETV in 1996. In 2001, it was also telecast on Star Plus. The episodes were dubbed in Bengali and broadcast on BTV in the early 1990s and into Tamil and broadcast on the DD Podhigai channel in 2006. In the BTV broadcast, portions of dialogue were censored. Outside the subcontinent, the drama was shown on Channel 4 in the United Kingdom during the early 1990s. Other countries included Iran, Indonesia and Mauritius. An original pack of 12 DVDs was later released.

A still from The Sword of Tipu Sultan with Sanjay Khan as Tipu Sultan (right) with Kanwaljeet Singh

== Fire accident ==
A major fire accident took place on 8 February 1989, in the Premier Studios of Mysore where the drama was being shot. Unavailability of firefighting equipment and ignorance of fire safety standards have been quoted as the major reasons. Loose wiring and absence of ventilators were further causes for the fire to spread. Instead of fire-proofing material, the walls had gunny bags and the temperature rose to around 120°C (248°F) because of huge lights being used for the shooting. All these factors contributed to the massive fire; the final death toll was 62. Sanjay Khan himself suffered major burns and had to spend 13 months in hospital and undergo 72 surgeries. An ex-gratia amount of Rs.5000 was paid to the victims.

== Awards ==
For his work on this drama, Sanjay Khan received the Gem of India Award.
