= Raj Kishore =

Indian actor

- Still from the movie Padosan
- Born: 1933
- Died: 7 April 2018 (aged 84–85); Goregaon, Mumbai, Maharashtra
- Years active: 1949–1997
- Spouse: Liza Kishore
- Children: 1

Raj Kishore (1933 – 7 April 2018) was an Indian actor who played roles in the Indian films such as Sholay (1975), Padosan (1968), Deewaar (1975), Ram Aur Shyam (1967), Hare Rama Hare Krishna (1971), Karishma Kudrat Kaa (1985), Aasmaan (1984), Bombay To Goa (1972) and Karan Arjun (1995).

== Personal life and death ==
Kishore was married to Lisa Kishore and had a son, Prem Kishore. He died on 7 April 2018 at the age of 85, due to a heart attack.
