= Chandrakant Gaur =

Chandrakant Gor
- Born: Chandrakant Gor; 9 January 1929
- Died: 23 July 2012 (aged 82)
- Occupations: Film director; film producer; screenwriter; actor
- Years active: 1939–1952 (as actor), 1951–1984 (as director)
- Notable work: Kabhi Dhoop Kabhi Chhaon (1971); Tulsi Vivah (1971); Hari Darshan (1972); Maha Sati Savitri (1973); Kisan Aur Bhagwan (1974); Bajrangbali (1976); Krishna-Krishna(1984)
- Spouse: Prabhavati Gor

Chandrakant Gor (1929–2012), commonly referred to simply as Chandrakant, is a Hindi B-movie director of action films and mythological movies. His work extends the Babubhai Mistri tradition, featuring Dara Singh (who also worked for Mistri) and Marathi star Jayshree Gadkar. He made Punjabi hits (e.g. Bhagat Dhanna Jat) reviving Punjabi cinema. He also made Gujarati mythological films.

== Career ==
In a career spanning nearly four decades, he directed 45 films including Hindi, Punjabi and Gujarati films, acted in 7 films and wrote stories for many films. He composed music in Do Dost (1951) along with S. Mohinder.

Bhagat Dhanna Jaat (1974), the Punjabi film he directed, is believed to have contributed to the revival of Punjabi cinema. His debut film as a director was Riding Hero (1951), a stunt film made by Laxmi Productions of Chimanlal Trivedi.

His acting career was from 1939 to 1952. He appeared in Midnight Mail (1939), Maataa (1942), Swarna Bhoomi (1944), Seedha Rasta (1947), Mere Laal (1948), Shiva Ramoshi (1951 - Marathi Film) and Chhatrapati Shivaji (1952).

He also produced few films like Balaram Shri Krishna (1968), Hari Darshan (1972), Har Har Mahadev (1974), Bajrangbali (1976), and Bolo He Chakradhari (1977) under the banner of "Joy Films".

== Filmography ==
=== As Director ===
Year	Film	Language	Cast	Notes	Production House
1951	Riding Hero	Hindi		Debut film as Director	Laxmi Productions
1955	Ganga Maiya	Hindi	Prem Adib, Sumitra Devi		Kala Kendra
1956	Delhi Durbar	Hindi			
1957	Aadhi Roti	Hindi	Prem Adib, Daisy Irani		Gandhi & Choksi Productions
1957	Aadhi Raat	Hindi			
1957	Sant Raghu	Hindi	Anand Kumar, Lalita Pawar, Nirupa Roy		
1958	Circus Sundari	Tamil	Kamal Kapoor, Kamini Kaushal, Mahipal	(Co-Director: C.M.Trivedi)	
1958	Great Show Of India	Hindi	Kamal Kapoor, Kamini Kaushal, Mahipal	(Co-Director: C.M.Trivedi)	
1959	Jagga Daku	Hindi	P. Jairaj, Jabeen Jalil, Minoo Mumtaz	Dubbed into Telugu as "Veera Jaggadu"	Chitra Bharti
1961	Ramleela	Hindi	Master Bhagwan, Abhi Bhattacharya, Moni Chatterjee		
1962	Jadugar Daku	Hindi	Bela Bose, Helen, P. Jairaj		
1963	Maya Mahal	Hindi	Bela Bose, Helen, Mahipal		Mona Films
1963	Zingaro	Hindi	Bela Bose, Laxmi Chhaya, Aruna Irani		
1964	Badshah	Hindi	Dara Singh, Nishi, Ramayan Tiwari		Nav Kala Niketan
1964	Roop Sundari	Hindi	Bela Bose, Mahipal, Anita Guha		Chitradoot
1964	Veer Bhimsen	Hindi	Dara Singh, Mumtaz, Sumitra Devi	Dubbed into Telugu as "Bhima Pratigna"	
1968	Balaram Shri Krishna	Hindi	Dara Singh, Savitri, Jayshree Gadkar		Joy Films
1970	Tarzan 303	Hindi	Chandgi Ram, Shabnam, K. N. Singh		
1971	Kabhi Dhoop Kabhi Chhaon	Hindi	Dara Singh, Ameeta, Jagdeep		
1971	Tulsi Vivah	Hindi	Abhi Bhattacharya, Anita Guha, Jayshree Gadkar	Dubbed into Telugu as "Siva Jalandhara Yuddham"	
1972	Hari Darshan	Hindi	Abhi Bhattacharya, Dara Singh, B.Saroja Devi		Joy Films
1973	Maha Sati Savitri	Hindi	Jayshree Gadkar, Upendra Trivedi, D.K. Sapru		Basant Pictures
1974	Bhagat Dhanna Jatt	Punjabi	Dara Singh, Jayshree Gadkar, Yogeeta Bali, Padma Khanna	(co-director : Dara Singh)	Dara Productions
1974	Har Har Mahadev	Hindi	Dara Singh, Jayshree Gadkar, Shahu Modak, Padma Khanna		Joy Films
1974	Kisan Aur Bhagwan	Hindi	Dara Singh, Feroz Khan, Yogeeta Bali, Abhi Bhattacharya		Dara Productions
1976	Bajrangbali	Hindi	Dara Singh, Biswajeet, Moushumi Chatterjee, Durga Khote		Joy Films
1977	Bolo He Chakradhari	Hindi	Dara Singh, Bhavana Bhatt, Sachin Pilgaonkar, Rajni Sharma		Joy Films
1977	Shri Krishna Sharanam Mama	Gujarati			
1979	Shankar Parvati	Gujarati			
1984	Shravan Kumar	Hindi, Gujarati	Bharat Bhushan, Jayashree Gadkar, Abhi Bhattacharya, Chandrima Bhaduri		
1984	Krishna-Krishna	Hindi	Biswajeet, vidya Sinha, Dara Singh, Anita Guha		Upendra Films
