= Ratan Aulakh =

Indian actor

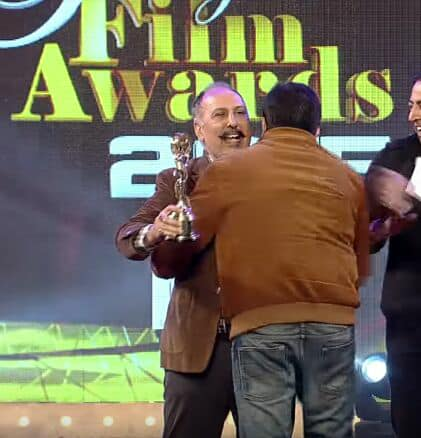
- Ratan Aulakh at PTC Punjabi Film Awards 2014
- Occupations: Actor, director, writer
- Years active: 1973-present
- Children: 2

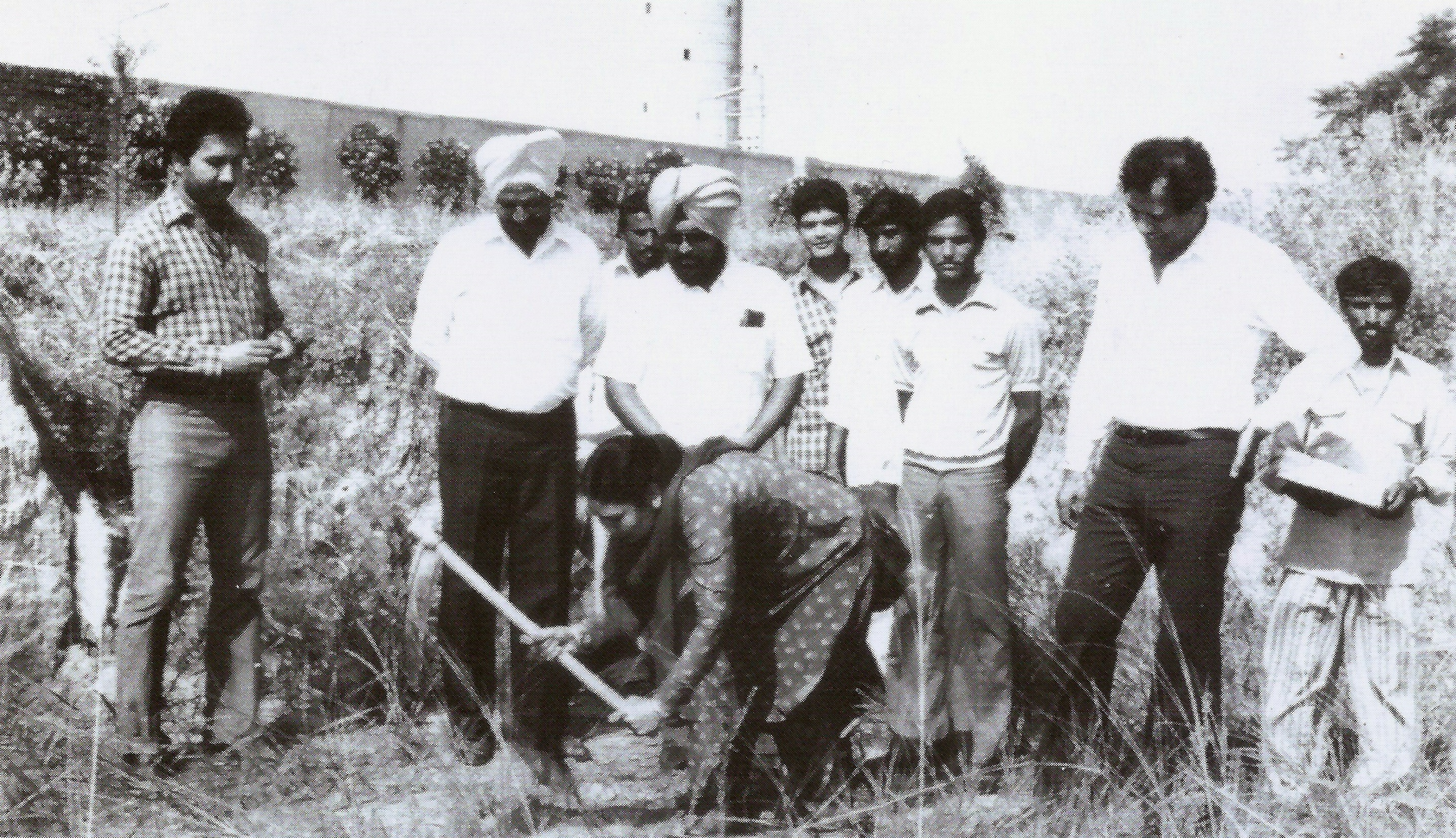
Ratan Aulakh (extreme left) at the foundation of Dara Studio.

Gurratan Singh Aulakh, known professionally as Ratan Aulakh is an Indian film and television actor, director, writer, producer and sports promoter.

== Early life and career ==
=== Background ===
Ratan Aulakh was born in Amritsar, Punjab, India. He started as a theater actor before transitioning to cinema.

=== Debut and breakthrough ===
Aulakh began his film career with the Hindi movie Mera Desh Mera Dharam in 1973. He gained recognition with the Punjabi film Mamla Garbar Hai (1983), where he starred opposite Gurdas Maan and played the main antagonist- Mickey.

=== Film and television career ===
Aulakh has worked in various capacities in the film industry, including acting, directing, writing, and producing. He works to bring Hindi filmmakers and actors to Punjabi cinema. His project ‘Mitter Pyaare nu Haal Mureedan da Kehna’ featured an appearance by Akshay Kumar. Ratan started working in Television during the 1990's with shows that include Junoon, Yug, Main Dilli Hoon, Vishnu Puran etc.

=== Sports promotion ===
Ratan has worked as a promoter and referee of freestyle wrestling and professional wrestling

=== Awards and recognitions ===
Ratan has been honored with Punjab Rafi Ratan Award in 2022 and 'Pride of Punjabi Cinema' award in July 2019.

=== Personal life ===
Aulakh is married and has two children. He is the brother-in-law of wrestler and filmmaker Dara Singh.

== Filmography ==
Year	Title	Language	Format	Notes
2025	Rajdhani	Punjabi	Web series	Actor
2024	Raunak †	Punjabi	Feature film	Actor
2024	Sukha Raider †	Punjabi	Web series	Actor
2024	Lambran da Laana	Punjabi	Feature film	Actor
2024	Nanak Naam Jahaz Hai	Punjabi	Feature film	Actor
2023	Mera Supna	Punjabi	Feature film	Actor
2023	Nidarr	Punjabi	Feature film	Executive Producer
2023	Mazdoor	Punjabi	Feature film	Actor, Director
2022	Bajre da sitta	Punjabi	Feature film	Actor
2021	Desi Magic †	Punjabi	Feature film	Actor
2014	Jatt James Bond	Punjabi	Feature film	Actor, Executive Producer
2004	Mitter Pyaare Nu Haal Mureedan da Kehna	Punjabi	Feature film	Actor, Director, Writer
2000	Vishnu Puran	Hindi	TV serial	Actor
1999	Jaalsaaz	Hindi	Feature film	Actor
1998	Main Dilli Hoon	Hindi	TV serial	Actor
1997	Sardari	Punjabi	Feature film	Actor
1996	Rab Diyan Rakhan	Punjabi	Feature film	Production Manager
1994	Karan	Hindi	Feature film	Writer
1997	Truck Driver	Punjabi	Feature film	Actor
1996	Yug	Hindi	TV serial	Actor
1994	Junoon	Hindi	TV serial	Actor
1994	Rakhwale	Hindi	Feature film	Actor
1993	Bechain	Hindi	Feature film	Actor
1993	Yaaraan Naal Bahaaraan	Punjabi	Feature film	Writer
1992	Pagdi Sambhal Jatta	Punjabi	Feature film	Actor
1991	Roohani Taaqat	Hindi	Feature film	Actor
1991	Maut ki Sazaa	Hindi	Feature film	Actor
1990	Sheran de putt sher	Punjabi	Feature film	Actor
1990	Amavas Ki Raat	Hindi	Feature film	Actor
1989	Satyavadi Raja Harishchandra	Hindi	TV serial	Actor
1986	Tarantula Tanzi	English	Theater	Action Director/Wrestling Coach
1988	Aakhri Nishchay	Hindi	Feature film	Actor
1988	Shoorveer	Hindi	Feature film	Actor
1983	Mamla Garbar Hai	Punjabi	Feature film	Actor
1983	Unkhilli Mutiyaar	Punjabi	Feature film	Actor
1982	Sarpanch	Punjabi	Feature film	Actor
1982	Main Intaquam Loonga	Hindi	Feature film	Actor, Fight Coordinator
1981	Guru Suleman Chela Pahelwan	Hindi	Feature film	Actor
1978	Bhakti Mein Shakti	Hindi	Feature film	Actor
1978	Dhyanu Bhagat	Punjabi	Feature film	Actor
1976	Bajrangbali	Hindi	Feature film	Actor
1976	Sawa Lakh Se Ek Ladaun	Punjabi	Feature film	Actor
1973	Mera Desh Mera Dharam	Hindi	Feature film	Actor

† Denotes films that have not yet been released

== See also ==
- List of Indian Punjabi films between 2001 and 2010
