= Tulsi Vivah (film) =

- Directed by: Chandrakant
- Starring: Jayshree Gadkar; Anita Guha
- Music by: C. Ramchandra
- Release date: 1971
- Country: India
- Language: Hindi

Tulsi Vivah (The Marriage of Tulsi) is a 1971 Bollywood fantasy drama film based on mythology. Directed by Chandrakant, the film stars Jayshree Gadkar and Anita Guha and narrates the origin of the Tulsi Vivah ritual.

== Cast ==
- Abhi Bhattacharya ... God Vishnu
- Jayshree Gadkar ... Vrinda
- Randhawa ... Jalandhara
- Dara Singh ... God Shiva
- Anita Guha ... Goddess Lakshmi
- Geetanjali ... Goddess Parvati
- Rajan Haksar ... God Indra
- Polson ... Senapati Khantasur
- Babu Raje ... Narada
- Ratnamala ... Vrinda's Mother
- Sunder ... Senapati's father-in-law
- Tun Tun ... Senapati's mother-in-law

== Music ==
1. "Bhagwan Ye De Vardaan Mujhe Har Saans Me Tera Naam Rahe" - Asha Bhosle
2. "Jwala Ki Chunri Jwala Ki Choli, Pehan Ke Chal Di" - Mahendra Kapoor
3. "Arre Meri Sawa Lakh Ki Nathni Lut GayiTeri Najariya Me" - Asha Bhosle
4. "Chalti Phirti Dukh Ki Kahani, Teri Bhi Kya Jindgani" - Mahendra Kapoor
5. "Mar Jayenge Hum Phir Bhi Sajan Yahi Kahenge" - Asha Bhosle
6. "Meri Tapasyaon Meri Sahay Karo, Meri Sadhnaao Meri Sahay Karo" - Asha Bhosle
7. "Mil Gaye Mil Gaye Mere Meet Salone, Peeraha Ki Bela Beet Gayi" - Krishna Kalle
8. "Natraj Mai Naari Niraali, Mai Himalay KiRahne Wali" - Asha Bhosle
9. "Tulsi Kunwari Bani Hai Dulhan, Dulha Saligraam Sakhiyo Do Taali" - Asha Bhosle
10. "Uttar Dakshin Ke Digpaalo Jaago, Purab Pashchim Ke Rakhwalo Jaago" - Mahendra Kapoor
11. "Tulsi Kunwari" (part 2) - Asha Bhosle
12. "Uttar Dakshin" (part 2) - Mahendra Kapoor
