= Badshah (1964 film) =

- Directed by: Chandrakant Gaur
- Written by: Charandas Shokh (dialogues)
- Story by: Charandas Shokh
- Produced by: Ramesh Vyas
- Starring: Dara Singh; Nishi; Rani; Ramayan Tiwari
- Cinematography: Vishnu Kumar Joshi
- Edited by: Shankerlal Nayak
- Music by: N. Dutta
- Production company: Navkala Niketan
- Release date: 1964
- Country: India
- Language: Hindi

Badshah is a 1964 Hindi-language action film directed by Chandrakant and starring Dara Singh, Nishi and Rani.

== Cast ==
- Dara Singh as Raaka "Badshah"
- Nishi as Sheeba / Tingu
- Rani
- Ramayan Tiwari as Salakas
- Tiger Joginder Singh
- Kumud Tripathi as Kaka / Champakali
- Keshav Rana as Sheru
- Radheshyam as Deewan Shamsheer 'Baba'
- Prince Kumali
- Saudagar Singh as Finale wrestler

== Music ==
#	Song title	Singer(s)
1	"Aaj Humko Hasaye"	Kamal Barot
2	"Ankhon Mein Tum"	Asha Bhosle
3	"E Ji Maine Kahsa"	Asha Bhosle
4	"Kuch Tumhe Aur Bhi"	Asha Bhosle
5	"Nigahen Aur Bhi Chahe"	Asha Bhosle, Purnima Seth
6	"Rahenge jab Tak Khamosh"	Asha Bhosle
