= Yatrik (film) =

- Directed by: Kartick Chatterjee
- Produced by: New Theatres
- Starring: Abhi Bhattacharya; Vasant Choudhury; Arundhati Mukherjee
- Music by: Pankaj Mullick
- Release date: 1952
- Language: Hindi

Yatrik is a 1952 Indian drama film directed by Kartick Chatterjee. It is the Hindi-language version of the Bengali film Mahaprasthaner Pathey, the film made from the book of the same name, written by Probodh Kumar Sanyal. Abhi Bhattacharya plays a young brahmachari, while Arundhati Mukherjee plays Rani, a strong-willed young widow who develops a soft corner for him. The film contains many sweet and memorable songs.

== Plot ==
The film depicts a group of pilgrims on an arduous trek in the high Himalayas. A part of the film was shot at the Garhwal region in the Himalayas. There are stills and videos of famous places of the Uttarakhand (then Uttar Pradesh) Himalayas like Hemkund Sahib, Rishikesh, Devaprayag, Kedarnath, etc.

== Cast ==
Actor/Actress	Role
Abhi Bhattacharya	Brahmacharya
Vasant Choudhury	Prabodh Kumar Sanyal
Arundhati Devi	Rani
Manorama	
Molina Devi	
Tulsi Chakrabarti	
Maya Mukherjee	
Rajlaxmi	

== Music ==
- Playback Singers were: Dhananjay Bhattacharya, Binota Chakraborty, Pankaj Mullick
- Music by Pankaj Mullick
- Lyrics by Pt. Bhushan
