= Nanak Dukhiya Sub Sansar =

Punjabi-language film released in 1970

- Film poster
- Punjabi: ਨਾਨਕ ਦੁਖੀਆ ਸਭੁ ਸੰਸਾਰੁ
- Directed by: Dara Singh
- Written by: Dara Singh
- Screenplay by: Nanak Singh
- Story by: Dara Singh
- Produced by: Dara Singh
- Starring: See below
- Music by: Prem Dhawan
- Release date: 1 August 1970 (Punjab)
- Running time: 135 minutes
- Country: India
- Language: Punjabi

Nanak Dukhiya Sub Sansar (transl. O Nanak, the World is full of Grief, 1970) is a Punjabi language film directed by Dara Singh. The lyrics were written by Prem Dhawan. Dhawan was awarded National Film Award for Best Lyrics in 1972 for its movie songs.

The film stars Dara Singh, Balraj Sahni and Pran in the lead roles. In this film Vindu Dara Singh debuted as a child actor.

== Plot ==
During a riot in 1948, two brothers get separated. Years later they meet and become friends. Gradually they learn about their actual relationship, that they are brothers. This knowledge does not help to stop their fight over a woman.

The film also shows the negative effect of alcoholism. In a song in the movie, a lead character states that the God resides with them who works hard in the fields and elsewhere, hence does not have necessity of any addiction.

== Cast ==
- Prithviraj Kapoor as Village Gurdwara Sahib head Granthi
- Balraj Sahni as subedar Varyam Singh
- Dara Singh as Kartar Singh
- Shaminder as Ram
- Meena Rai as Jetta
- Pran as villager Giani
- Achala Sachdev as Kartar mother
- Rammohan Sharma as Peter
- Daljeet as Sant Ram, Kartar's father
- Satyajeet as young Kartar Singh
- Vindu Dara Singh as young Ram
- Ratan Aulakh as Liquor store owner son
- Moolchand as Bhola Ram
- Mumtaz Begum as Varyam's sister
- Manju as Sheila
- Saudagar Singh

== Soundtrack ==
All lyrics are written by Prem Dhawan; all music is composed by Pram Dhawan too.

Tracks
No.	Title	Singer	Length
1.	"Satguru Hohye Dayal"	Mukesh
2.	"Sab Daata De Bandhey"	Mohammed Rafi
3.	"Nanak Dukhiya Sub Sansar"	Mahendra Kapoor
4.	"Hukme Andar Sab Ko"	Asha Bhosle
5.	"Sade khetan wich rab wasda"	Mohammed Rafi, Shaminder
6.	"Jaa Veerab Dee Ladleeye Jaa"	Mohammed Rafi
7.	"Ja Dheeya gar apni"	Shaminder

== Box office ==
The film was successful at the box office.

== See also ==
- Nanak Shah Fakir, film released in 2018
