= Kabhi Dhoop Kabhi Chhaon =

- Directed by: Chandrakant Gaur
- Starring: Dara Singh; Ameeta
- Music by: Chitragupta
- Release date: 1971
- Country: India
- Language: Hindi

Kabhi Dhoop Kabhi Chhaon is a 1971 Bollywood drama film directed by Chandrakant. The film stars Dara Singh and Ameeta.

== Cast ==
- Dara Singh
- Ameeta
- Jagdeep
- Geethanjali
- Ram Mohan
- D.K. Sapru

== Music ==
The music of the film was composed by Chitragupta and lyrics by Pradeep and Prem Dhawan

1. "Sukh Dukh Dono Rehte Jisme Jeevan Hai Jivan Hai Wo Gaanv, Kabhi Dhoop Kabhi Chhaon" – Pradeep
2. "Hai Re Sanjog Tune Kya Ghadi Diklayi, Paas Lakaer So Dilo Ko Phir Se Kyo De Di Judaai" – Pradeep
3. "Aankh Ka Tara Mera Chand Se Pyara Re" – Lata Mangeshkar
4. "Ankh Ka Tara Mera Pt. 2" – Lata Mangeshkar
5. "Samay Ke Haath Ka Kathputla Hai Is Jag Me Insaan, Chal Musafir Chal Yahan" – Pradeep
6. "Badli Mein Chand Hai" – Lata Mangeshkar, Mohammed Rafi
7. "Dil Dhadke Hay Pyar Mera Sharmaye, Bolo Ji Ab Ky Hoga" – Lata Mangeshkar, Manna Dey
8. "Koi Gusse Ho Ya Raaji Aji Apni Bala Se, Hum Toh Chalenege Isi Banki Ada Se" – Manna Dey
9. "Mai Bhi Jalu Tu Bhi Jale Aaja Sanam Lag Jaa Gale" – Usha Iyer
