= Nanak Singh =

Indian writer

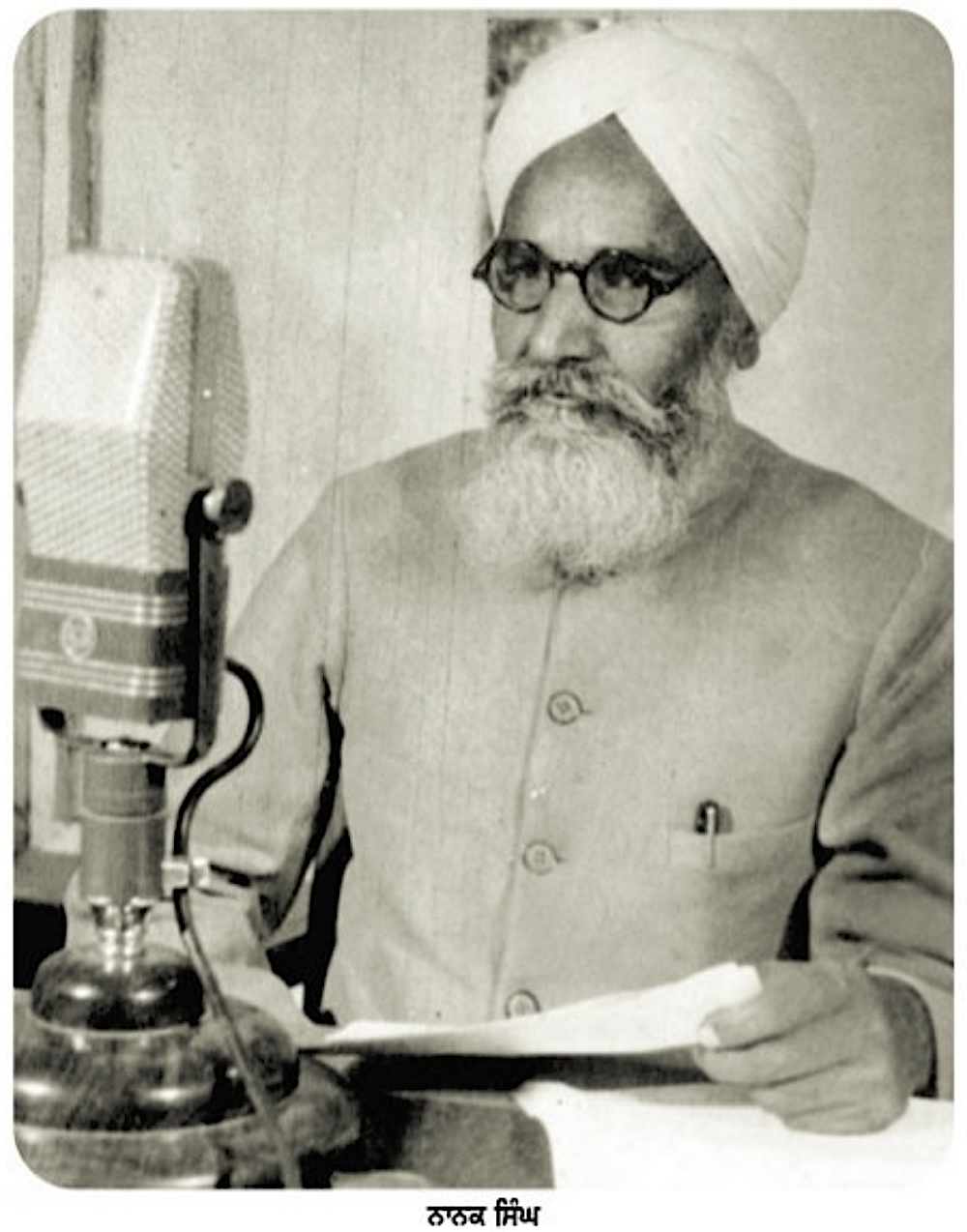
- Nanak Singh in c.1952
- Born: Hans Raj; 4 July 1897; Chak Hamid, Jhelum district, Punjab, British India (present-day Punjab, Pakistan)
- Died: 28 December 1971 (aged 74); Ambarsar Punjab, India
- Occupations: Playwright, poet, Novelist
- Spouse: Raj Kaur
- Children: Kulwant Singh Suri (son); Kulbir Singh Suri (son); Kanwaljit Singh Suri (son); Kartar Singh Suri (son); Kuldeep Singh Suri (son); Pushpinder Kaur (daughter)

Nanak Singh, (b. 4 July 1897 as Hans Raj – 28 December 1971), was an Indian poet, songwriter, and novelist of the Punjabi language. His literary works in support of India's independence movement led the British to arrest him. He published novels that won him literary acclaim.

== Early life ==
Nanak Singh was born to a poor Punjabi Hindu family in the Jhelum district of Pakistan as 'Hans Raj'. He later changed his name to Nanak Singh after adopting Sikhism. Although he did not receive a formal education, he started writing at an early age by writing verses on historical events. Later, Singh started to write devotional songs, encouraging Sikhs to join the Gurdwara Reform Movement. In 1918, he published his first book Satguru Mehma, which contained hymns in praise of the Sikh Gurus. It is considered his first commercially successful literary work. He was one of the few survivors of the Jallianwala Bagh Massacre.

== Indian Independence movement ==
On 13 April 1919, British troops killed vary from 379 to 1,500 or more people and over 1,200 other people were injured of whom 192 were seriously injured during a peaceful rally participants in what became known as the Jallianwala Bagh Massacre on Baisakhi (Punjabi New Year) day in Amritsar. Singh was present with two friends who were killed in the massacre. This incident impelled Singh to write Khomeini Visayans – Bloody Baisakhi (Punjabi New Year), an epic poem that mocked colonial rule. The British Government became concerned about his provocative publication and banned the book.

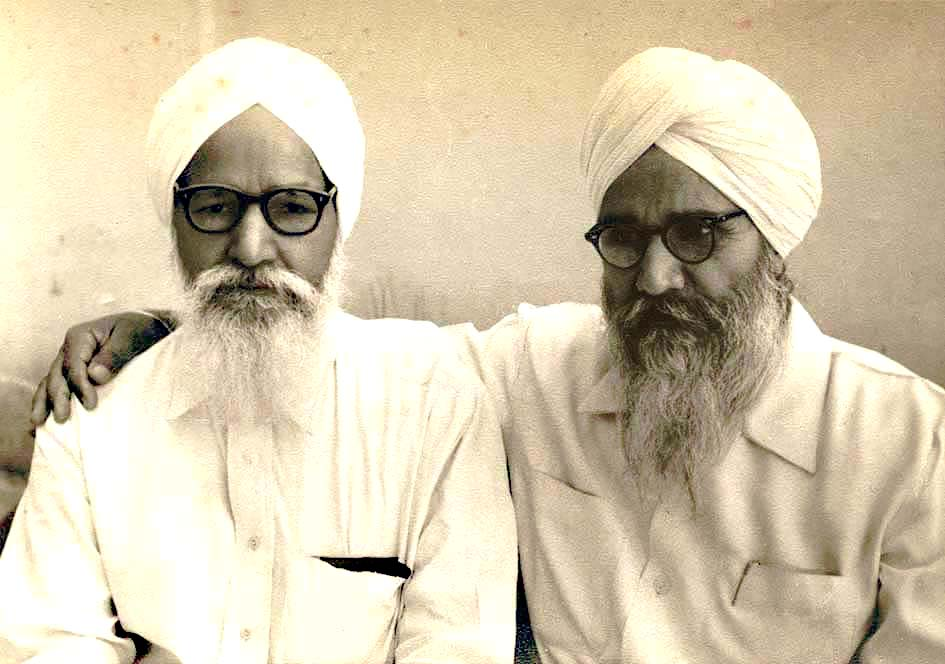
Nanak Singh and Gopal Singh Chandan in 1958

Singh participated in India's independence struggle by joining the Akali movement. He became the editor of Akali papers. This was noticed by the British Government. Singh was charged with participation in unlawful political activities and was sent to Borstal Jail, Lahore. He described the savagery and oppression of the British on peaceful Sikhs during the Guru ka Bagh Mocha demonstration in his second poetry collection, Zakhmi Dil. It was published in January 1923, and was banned within two weeks of publication.

Singh wrote several novels during his time in jail, including over 40,000 pages in longhand Gurmukhi (Punjabi) script.

He was publicly recognized with many awards, including Punjab's highest literary award in 1960. His great historical novel, Ik Mian Do Talwaran (One Sheath and Two Swords, 1959), won him India's highest literary honor, the Sahitya Akademi Award, in 1962.

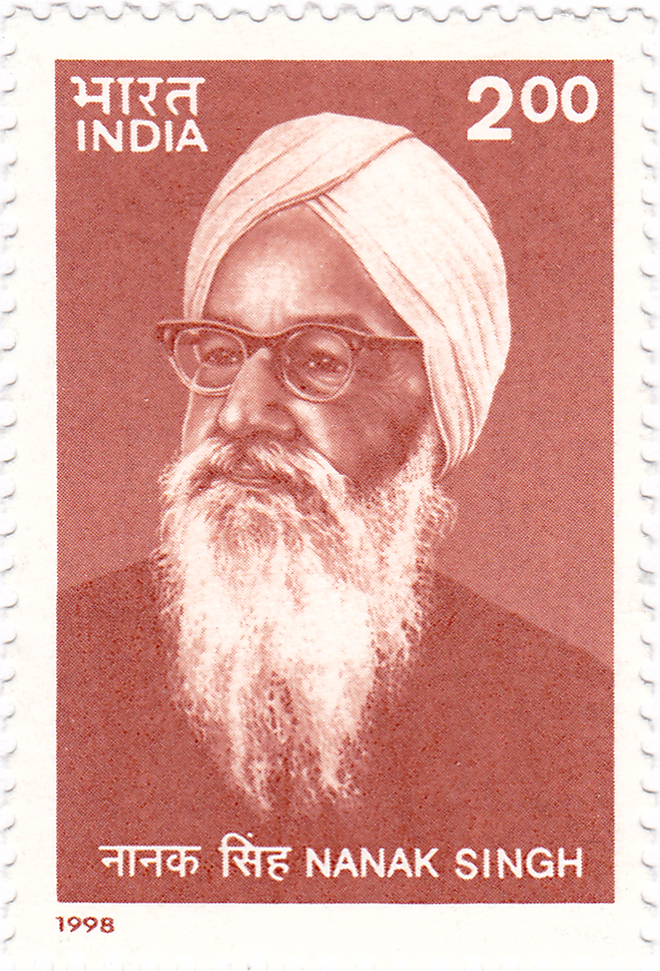
Nanak Singh 1998 stamp of India

== Prolific writer ==
In 1945 he wrote his popular novel "Saintly Sinner (Pavitra Paapi)". Good Reads., which won him acclaim. It was translated into Hindi and other Indian languages, and into English by his grandson Navdeep Singh Suri. In 1968 the book was adapted into the successful motion picture, (Pavitra Paapi)(ਪਵਿੱਤਰ ਪਾਪੀ), by his admirer Balraj Sahani. Nanak Singh wrote dialogue and screenplay for Dara Singh’s Punjabi movie Nanak Dukhiya Sub Sansar (ਨਾਨਕ ਦੁਖਿਆ ਸਬ ਸੰਸਾਰ)

Quoting the Tribune, "Nanak Singh was the best selling novelist in India for thirty to forty years. He wrote over 50 books including novels and collection of short stories. He made significant contributions to various literary genres. For him character was the determination of incident and incident the illustration of character. His greatest contribution to Punjabi fiction is its secularization. He depicted excerpts from contemporary life, cloaked with a veil of romantic idealism."

In his novel Chitta Lahu (White Blood), Singh writes, "It seems to imply that in the lifeblood of our society, red corpuscles have disappeared." Singh's grandson, Dilraj Singh Suri, has translated Chitta Lahu into English (titled White Blood). Natasha Tolstoy, the granddaughter of novelist Leo Tolstoy, translated Singh's novel Chitta Lahu into Russian. She visited Nanak Singh in Amritsar to present to him the first copy of the translated novel.

== Bibliography ==
Books By Nanak Singh ( Novel, Stories, Play, Translated Novel)

- Aastak Nastak
- Adam Khor
- Adh-khiria Phul
- Agg Di Khed
- An-site Zakham
- B.A. Pass
- Bhooa
- Charhdi Kala
- Chhalawa
- Chitrakar
- Chitta Lahu
- Chod Chanan
- Dhundle Parchhaven
- Dur Kinara
- Fauladi Phull
- France Da Daku
- Gagan Damama Bajia
- Gangajali Vich Sharab
- Gharib Di Duniya
- Hanjuan De Har
- Ik Mian Do Talwaran
- Jivan Sangram
- Kagtan Di Beri
- Kal Chakkar
- Kati Hoyee Patang
- Kallo
- Khoon De Sohile
- Koi Haria Boot Rahio Ri
- Lamma Painda
- Love Marriage
- Manjhdhar
- Matreyee Maan
- Meri Duniya
- Merian Sadivi Yadan
- Middhe Hoe Phull
- Mittha Mauhra
- Nasoor
- Paap Di Khatti
- Paraschit
- Pathar De Khamb
- Pathar Kamba
- Patjhar De Panchhi
- Pavitar Papi
- Piar Da Devta
- Piar Di Duniya
- Prem Sangeet
- Pujari
- Rabb Apne Asli Rup Vich
- Rajni
- Saarh Sati
- Sangam
- Sarapian Roohan
- Soolan Di Sej
- Suman Kanta
- Sunehri Jild
- Supnian Di Kabar
- Swarg Te Usde Varis
- Taash Di Aadat
- Tasvir De Doven Pase
- Thandian Chhavan
- Tutte Khambh
- Tutti Veena
- Vadda Doctor Te Hor Kahanian
- Var Nahin Sarap
- Vishwas Ghaat

== Adaptations of his works ==
Pavitra Paapi, a 1970 Indian Hindi-language drama film was based on his novel of the same name. His short story Sunehri Jild was adapted into a television short of the same name that aired on DD Punjabi.

== Legacy ==
His centenary was celebrated in 1997. In honor of Singh, India's Prime Minister Inder Kumar Gujral released a postal stamp with his image in 1998.
