= Pavitra Papi =

1970 film by Rajendra Bhatia

- Movie poster
- Directed by: Rajendra Bhatia
- Written by: Nanak Singh
- Based on: Pavitra Paapi by Nanak Singh
- Starring: Balraj Sahni; Parikshit Sahni; Tanuja
- Music by: Prem Dhawan
- Release date: 25 September 1970
- Country: India
- Language: Hindi

Pavitra Papi (transl. The Holy Sinner) is a 1970 Indian Hindi-language drama film directed by Rajendra Bhatia. The film stars Balraj Sahni, Parikshit Sahni and Tanuja. The movie was based on a Punjabi novel by famous writer Nanak Singh.

== Plot ==
It is small-town India of the 19th century. Pannalal is employed in a clock repair shop owned by Lala Attarchand. He is replaced by Kedarnath, who has some old family bonds with Lala Attarchand, and who has come to town from his village in search of exactly this work, because his ancestors were in the same business (clock-making). Upon losing his job, Pannalal curses Kedarnath as being the cause of his family becoming destitute. He writes a letter to Kadarnath saying that "your actions have driven me to death because I cannot support my family or get my daughters married." Pannalal then disappears from the scene, after telling his wife that he is going to a far-off city in order to meet an old friend and raise money.

Kedarnath, who has received the suicide note, is convinced that Pannalal has committed suicide after telling his wife a comforting story. He is consumed by guilt. He goes out of his way to help Pannalal's wife Maya and their two daughters, Veena and Vidya. He rents a room in their house, writes letters to Maya which are delivered to her as if they have come from Pannalal, and these letters also contain money. As a helpful tenant, he does a lot of work around the house, and also helps Veena with her school-work. He falls in love with her, but her feelings are not properly known. Maya tells Kedarnath of one big concern in her life: Veena's marriage was already arranged by Pannalal, and now the boy's family are trying to wiggle out of the engagement, perhaps because the Pannalal family is now quite poor. The boy's parents are saying that they can no longer wait for Pannalal to return with funds, their boy is growing older by the day, and they will now look elsewhere. Kedarnath hides his feelings for Veena and helps in expediting in her marriage with the son of Daulatram. When Maya tells him that she does not have enough money to pay for the marriage expenses, he steals cash from his employer, and tells Maya that the money has come from Pannalal. He then goes away from the village.

Veena's in-laws turn out to be rogues, except for her father-in-law, who counsels his family that they should not torture their daughter-in-law this way. Meanwhile, Pannalal, who is in fact alive, returns to his family. Hearing that his daughter is already married to the person with whom he had arranged the marriage, he proceeds to Veena's marital home to visit her. Here, he finds that his daughter is living in a miserable condition. He brings her back to his own house.

Kedar, who now lives in Delhi, regularly sends money orders to repay his debt to Lala Attarchand. Pannalal finds out Kedar's whereabouts and requests him to come back and save a dying Veena. But Kedar instead makes Veena's husband realize his mistakes and unites the pair without appearing in person. The film ends with Kedarnath going away.

== Cast ==
- Balraj Sahni ... Pannalal
- Parikshat Sahni ... Kedarnath
- Tanuja ... Veena
- Neetu Singh ... Vidya (as Baby Sonia)
- Achala Sachdev ... Maya
- Abhi Bhattacharya ... Writer (Man who helped Kedarnath)
- I. S. Johar ... Lala Attarchand
- Manorama ... Mrs. Lala Attarchand
- Gulshan Bawra ... Adarshan's worker
- Upendra Trivedi
- Jugnu
- Jayshree T. ... Dancer in white dress (in song "Sada Sadak Dil") (as Jaishree)
- Madhumati... as dancer in the song "Lede saiyaan ordnee"

== Music ==
Prem Dhawan has composed both the lyrics and music for this movie. "Teri Duniya Se" is sung by Kishore Kumar. This song was played across radio and television channels when Kishore died on 13 October 1987. Another song by Rafi Sahab, "Allah Hi Allah Kar Pyare", was filmed at a very famous place called Rani Talab (queen's bathing pond) in the historic town Jind, a district city of Haryana.

Song	Singer
"Teri Duniya Se Hoke Majboor Chala"	Kishore Kumar
"Dilwale Dukhde Bure, Rona Padta Hai"	Lata Mangeshkar
"Allah Hi Allah Kar Pyare"	Mohammed Rafi
"La De Saiyan Odhni Punjabi Tilledaar"	Asha Bhosle, Mohammed Rafi
"O Munni Ke Lala, Naag Das Gaya Kala"	Asha Bhosle, Usha Khanna
"Sada Sadak Dil Kare Dhak Dhak"	Asha Bhosle, Usha Mangeshkar
"Poochho Na Kaise Haay Pehli Raat Guzri"	Asha Bhosle
