= Hum Sub Chor Hain =

Hum Sub Chor Hain (lit. 'We Are All Thieves') is the title of several Hindi films from India:

- Hum Sub Chor Hain (1973 film)
- Hum Sub Chor Hain (1995 film)
