= Kisan Aur Bhagwan =

- Directed by: Chandrakant
- Starring: See below
- Music by: Prem Dhawan
- Distributed by: Dara Productions
- Release date: 1974
- Country: India
- Language: Hindi

Kisan Aur Bhagwan is a 1974 Bollywood action comedy-drama film. The film was produced by Dara Singh and directed by Chandrakant, starring Dara Singh, Feroz Khan, Yogeeta Bali and Abhi Bhattacharya among others.

== Plot ==
Ghasitaram, under pressure from his wife, decides to allocate a barren piece of land to his orphaned nephew, Dhanna, who lives with his wife, Bhagwanti, and sister, Laali. Dhanna strives in vain to till this piece of land and ultimately decides to call in Bhagwan Shri Vishnu for assistance. He goes to Pandit Tirlochan, who, instead gives him a rock, and the naive Dhanna brings it home, and refuses to eat anything until and unless Vishnuji shares his humble offerings. This leads to the entire community, including Bhagwanti and Laali, coming to the conclusion that Dhanna has lost his mind.

== Cast ==
- Dara Singh as Dhanna
- Feroz Khan as Shyamu
- Yogeeta Bali as Laali
- Abhi Bhattacharya as Vishnu
- Jayshree Gadkar as Lakshmi
- Jankidas as Ghasitaram
- Padma Khanna as Parvathi
- Asit Sen
- Nand Kumar
- Lalita Kumari as Ghasitaram's Wife
- Saudagar Singh

== Soundtrack ==
Soundtrack was composed by Prem Dhawan and lyrics were penned by Kavi Pradeep

Song	Artist(s)
"Are Waah Re Jadugar"	Mohammed Rafi
"Bhagwan Pyare Apne Bhagath Kee Laj Bachana Re"	Mohammed Rafi
"Ban Gayi Baat Sajna"	Kishore Kumar, Asha Bhosle
"Badi Door Se Ho Ji"	Asha Bhosle
"Ho Nacho Nacho He Sundar Bala Manna Dey"	Minoo Purushottam
"Kya Insan Aur Kya Bhagwan"	Manna Dey
"Chamatkar Prabhu Ne"	Manna Dey
