= Nabin Jatra =

1953 film by Subodh Mitra

- Directed by: Subodh Mitra
- Starring: Uttam Kumar; Maya Mukherjee; Tulsi Chakraborty; Basanta Choudhury
- Release date: 1953
- Language: Bengali

Nabin Jatra was a Bengali drama film directed by Subodh Mitra. This film was released on 11 September 1953 under the banner of New Theatres. Pankaj Mullick was the music director of the movie.

== Cast ==
- Uttam Kumar
- Maya Mukherjee
- Tulsi Chakraborty
- Basanta Choudhury
- Kali Banerjee
- Molina Devi
- Harimohan Bose
- Debabala
- Samar Kumar
- Parijat Bose
- Naresh Bose
- Rekha Chattopadhyay
