= Maha Sati Savitri =

- Directed by: Chandrakant Gaur
- Starring: Jayshree Gadkar and Upendra Trivedi
- Release date: 1973
- Country: India
- Language: Hindi

Maha Sati Savitri is a 1973 Hindi mythological film directed by Chandrakant. The film stars Jayshree Gadkar and Upendra Trivedi.

== Summary ==
Maha Sati Savitri is the story of some of the greatest woman India has given birth to. These are women who are today worshipped as goddesses by many, women who have made great sacrifices to protect their family. The story of Sukanya and Savitri the epitome of womanhood.

== Cast ==
- Jayshree Gadkar ... Rajkumari Savitri
- Upendra Trivedi ... Satyavan
- Meena T. ... Rajkumari Sukanya
- Ratnamala ... Maharani Malvi
- Anuradha
- Ashwani Kumar
- D.K. Sapru ... Bhagwan Shri Yamraj (as Sapru)
- Prabha Desai
- Kalpana Divan
- Arvind Pandya
- Amrit Patel ... Rajkumar
- Radheshyam
- Rani
- Arvind Rathod ... Maharaj Ashvapati
- Shribhagwan
- Sujata
- Kumud Tripathi

== Songs ==
All songs were written by Kavi Pradeep.

1. "Chupke Chupke Chupchap" – Mahendra Kapoor, Asha Bhosle
2. "Hansa Rana Na Jao Chod Ke" – Asha Bhosle
3. "Meri Dunia Badal Gayi Aaj Re" – Asha Bhosle
4. "Naino Ki Kothari Saja Ke" – Asha Bhosle
5. "Yeh Bharat Hai Ratnon Ki Khani" – Mahendra Kapoor
6. "Ek Chamatkar Hai Yeh" – Mahendra Kapoor
7. "Ek Ganga Kahin Se Aayi" – Mahendra Kapoor
8. "Mera Kar Do Amar Suhaag" – Vani Jairam, Suman Kalyanpur
