= Ratna Deepam =

1953 film by Debaki Bose

- Theatrical release poster
- Directed by: Debaki Bose
- Screenplay by: Kannadasan; T. M. Balasubramaniam; Eswara Chadra Sastry
- Story by: Prabathkumar Chatterjee
- Produced by: Debaki Bose
- Starring: Abhi Bhattacharya; Anupama; Sanyal
- Cinematography: Theoji Bhai
- Edited by: Kamal Ganguly, Govardhan Adhikari
- Music by: Robin Chatterjee
- Production company: Debaki Bose Productions
- Release date: 11 September 1953
- Running time: 148 minutes
- Country: India
- Languages: Tamil; Bengali

Ratna Deepam (transl. Jewelled Lamp) is a 1953 Indian film directed by Debaki Bose. The film stars Abhi Bhattacharya and Anupama. It was shot simultaneously in Tamil and Bengali languages. The Bengali version was titled Ratnadeep. The Tamil version was released on 11 September 1953.

== Plot ==
A son from a rich family has been missing for a long time. A man comes to the family feigning to be their lost son. He enjoys life with the wealth in the family. However, when the wife approaches him with trust and affection his conscience demands a hearing. Even though he is an imposter he does not want to take advantage of the wife's innocence. Finally, his conscience wins.

== Cast ==
List adapted from the database of Film News Anandan.

Male cast

- Abhi Bhattacharya
- Pahari Sanyal
- S. P. K. Rao
- S. P. K. Murthi
- N. Viswanathan

Female cast

- Anupama
- Manju Dey as Kanakam
- Molina
- Chhaya Devi

== Production ==
The film was produced and directed by Debaki Bose. Story was written by Prabathkumar Chatterjee and the dialogues were penned by Kannadasan, T. M. Balasubramaniam and Eswara Chandra Sastry. Cinematography was handled by Theoji Bai while the editing was done by Kamal Ganguly and Govardhan Adhikari. Art direction was by Sathyan Rai Choudry. Adhinlal was in charge of choreography. The film was made by Radha Films at New Theatres, Calcutta.

== Soundtrack ==
Music was composed by Robin Chatterjee. A song by Subramania Bharathiyar also was included in the film.

Song	Singer/s	Lyricist
Kaanamenum Thanam Kandaen	M. S. Rajeswari	Vijayakumar
Kaadhal Endraale Mana Thunbam	M. S. Rajeswari	Vijayakumar
Solluven Kaelaayi Soga Kadhai	Aiyalur Krishnan & Lakshmi Rani	Vijayakumar
Idaya Veenai Thannaiye	Devanarayanan	Vijayakumar
Punidhai Vaazhvu Erindhadhe	Devanarayanan	Valampuri Somanathan
Kandadhu Mudhal Aasai Konden	T. V. Rathnam	Papanasam Sivan
Yaaro Idhai Sitrinbam Enbaar	T. V. Rathnam	Papanasam Sivan
Pagaivanukarulvaai	T. V. Rathnam	Subramania Bharathiyar

== Reception ==
The Hindu wrote, "The refinement of Mr. Bose's art would thrill film-lovers even in this dubbed Tamil version of the picture". The Indian Express wrote, "Portions of the picture have been dubbed in Tamil and this has been done so well as to make it hardly noticeable. The picture has all the flavour of a first hand effort."
