= Krishna-Krishna =

- Directed by: Chandrakant
- Starring: Biswajeet; Vidya Sinha; Dara Singh; Anita Guha; Sudhir Dalvi; Ranjeet
- Music by: Shankar–Jaikishan
- Release date: 1986
- Running time: 176 minutes
- Country: India
- Language: Hindi

Krishna-Krishna is a 1986 Indian mythology movie, directed by Chandrakant. It stars Biswajeet, Vidya Sinha, Dara Singh, Anita Guha, Sudhir Dalvi and Ranjeet.

== Story ==
It adapts various events, plays of Lord Krishna, from Mahabharata, Bhagavata Purana, such as Krishna Sudama at Sandipani Ashram, Panchajanya vadh, Pundarika vadh, Krishna and eight Queens, Krishna Tulabharam. Its very similar to Balram Shri Krishna movie, with Dara Singh starring as Balram in both.

== Starring ==
- Biswajeet as Shri Krishna
- Vidya Sinha as Rukmini
- Dara Singh as Balram
- Anita Guha as Revati
- Jayshree Gadkar as Susheela
- Sudhir Dalvi as Sudama
- Ranjeet as Pondrik Krishna Vasudev

== Soundtrack ==
- "Mere Pran Chhoote Na Chhoote" - Anwar, Sharda
- "Krishna Sudama" (Part-1) - Mahendra Kapoor
- "Krishna Sudama" (Part-2) - Mahendra
- "Krishna Sudama" (Part-3) - Mahendra Kapoor
- "Nirmohi Natwar Se Pad Gaya Pala Re" - Asha Bhosle
- "Sanwla Salona Shyam Rang Wala" + Chandrani Mukherjee, Sharda
- "Sajan Tum Hume Yunhi Sataya Na Karna" - Sharda
- "Chanda Suraj Ki Jyoti Ban" - Mahendra Kapoor
