= Arvind Rathod =

Indian actor (1941–2021)

- Born: 14 February 1941; Bhavnagar, Bombay Presidency, British India
- Died: 1 July 2021 (aged 80); Ahmedabad, Gujarat, India
- Occupation: Actor

Arvind Rathod (14 February 1941 – 1 July 2021) was an Indian film and theatre actor known for his work in Gujarati theatre and Gujarati cinema.

== Biography ==
Rathod was born on 14 February 1941 in Bhavnagar, Gujarat. His father was a tailor. Because of his interest in acting from school and college, Rathod decided to choose acting over his father's tailoring business.

== Career ==
He started his acting career in Gujarati theatre with the play Mota Gharni Vahu directed by Aruna Irani's father F. R. Irani. He worked as a photo journalist before starting his career in film industry. In 1967, he was brought to Bombay from his home town in Gujarat by Vinod Jani for his play Preet Piyu Ne Panetar. He started his career on the film screen by playing a small role as a photographer in his first Hindi film Mera Naam Joker. In 1967, his first Gujarati film Gujaratan was released. In 1969, Kanku, Sansarleela and Janani ni Jod and in 1973, Janamtip was released. He had acted in six films in 1976. His role of 'Jetha' played in Bhadar Tara Vaheta Pani established him as a villain in Gujarati cinema.

He played major roles in Gujarati films including Ghar Gharni Vaat, Ma-baap, Pankhino Malo, Sona Ni Jaal, Lohi Bhini Chundadi, Kanyaviday, Mandvano Mor, Sant Savaiyanath, Halone Madi Garbe Ramado and Mare Todle Betho Mor.

He acted in Hindi films like Kora Kagaz (1974), Agneepath (1990) (as Hasmukh) and Khuda Gawah (1992).

He acted in many Gujarati plays including Mukhavato, Shikast, Mahayatra, Babasaheb, Ghatana-2003. In Shafi Inamdar directorial 'Ek Sapnu Badu Shaitani' his role as a father is memorable. He has also directed the play Mujhe Ajwalan Jaaye.

In 2006, he was nominated for Indian Telly Award in category of Best Actor for his role in Thodi Khushi Thode Gham

== Personal life ==
Rathod was unmarried and was survived by his niece-in-law. He died on 1 July 2021 in Paldi, Ahmedabad, aged 83 due to age-related complications.

== Filmography ==
In his career, he acted in more than 250 films including Gujarati and Hindi films and more than 70 plays. He was known for playing negative roles in Gujarati films.

=== Hindi films ===
- Lady Killer (1968)
- Mera Naam Joker (1970)
- Johnny Uska Naam (1970)
- Badnam Farishte (1971)
- Maha Sati Savitri (1973)
- Kora Kagaz (1974)
- Toofan Aur Bijlee (1975)
- Mera Jiwan (1976)
- Salaam Memsaab (1979)
- Hamari Jung (1987)
- Tawaif Ki Beti (1988)
- Agneepath (1990)
- Khuda Gawah (1992)
- Ab To Aaja Saajan Mere (1994)

=== Gujarati films ===
- Jesal Toral (1971)
- Hothal Padamani
- Janamteep (1974)
- Bhadar Tara Vehata Paani (1976)
- Baba Ramdev Pir (1976)
- Son Kansari (1977)
- Mota Gharni Vahu (1978)
- Koinu Mindhal Koina Hathe (1979)
- Ganga Sati (1979)
- Raja Gopichand (1979)
- Vaya Viramgam (1980)
- Jog Sanjog (1980)
- Maniyaro (1980)
- Alkhane Oatle (1980)
- Vaheta Aansu Vahu Na (1981)
- Jagya Tyathi Sawaar (1981)
- Putra Vadhu (1982)
- Kanku Ni Kimat (1983)
- Lohibhini Choondani (1986)
- Shetal Tara Oona Pani (1986)
- Kanya Viday (1986)
- Maa Khodal Taro Khamkaro (1989)
- Maa Tere Aangan Nagara Baje (1990)
- Shetal Tara Unda Pani (1990)
- Sabar Tara Vehta Pani (1990)
- Aapna Malak Na Mayalu Manvi (1994)
- Mehandi Rang Lagyo (1997)
- Khodiyar Chhe Jogmaya (2001)
- Hu Tari Meera Ne Tu Maro Shyam Re (2011)
- Dikrine Na Desho Koi Pardesh (2011)
- Tension Thai Gayu (2018)
- Sharad Poonamani Rat

=== Gujarati play ===
- 11 Kalak 23 Minit
- Garvi Gujaratane Rang Rakhyo
- Mukhavato
- Shikast
- Mahayatra
- Babasaheb
- Ghatana-2003
- Ba retiered thay chhe
