= Faulad =

- Directed by: Mohammed Hussain
- Written by: Mulkraj Bhakri; Farooq Kaisser
- Produced by: Vinod Doshi
- Starring: Dara Singh; Mumtaz; Minu Mumtaz; Randhir; Shyam Kumar; Ratnamala; Kamal Mehra
- Cinematography: Suleman; Anant Wadadeker
- Edited by: K.B. Bhadsavle
- Music by: G.S. Kohli
- Production company: Broadway Pictures
- Release date: 23 November 1963 (India)
- Running time: 145 minutes
- Country: India
- Language: Hindi

Faulad is a 1963 Bollywood film written by Mulkraj Bhakri and Farooq Kaisser and directed by Mohammed Hussain, starring Dara Singh, Mumtaz, Minu Mumtaz, and Randhir.

The film duration is 145 minutes.

== Plot ==
An astrologer shares a prediction with his Maharaja (Kamal Mehra) that in 18 years his daughter will marry a lower caste man who will dethrone him. The frightened ruler immediately orders that all newborn lower-caste male children be killed. But one boy's mother places her infant son in a basket, and floats him down the river. A royal maid (Praveen Paul) finds the child and saves him and raises him within the royal court. Over the next 18 years, the boy grows to become the adult Amar (Dara Singh). He soon falls in love with the Maharaja's daughter (Mumtaz) and is appointed head of the Royal Site since the Maharajah believes him to be of noble birth. The scheming Prime Minister has his own designs on the princess, and it is not long before he orchestrates Amar's falling out of favor.

== Cast ==
- Dara Singh as Amar
- Mumtaz as Rajkumari Padma
- Minu Mumtaz as Veena
- Kamran
- Randhir as Mantri
- Shyam Kumar
- Ratnamala as Amar's Mom
- Kamal Mehra as Maharaja
- Praveen Paul as Ranjit Singh's Wife
- Uma Dutt as Thakur Ranjit Singh
- Habib as a Soldier
- Baburao
- Vishwas Kunte
- Jamal
- Kamal Mohan
- Nazir Kashmiri
- Arvind
- Sabir
- Moolchand as Captive / Bandit / Fisherman

== Music ==
Songs by Faruk Kaiser

Song	Singer(s)
"Dil Hai Humara Phool Se Nazuk"	Mohammed Rafi
"Jane Jana Yun Na Dekho"	Asha Bhosle
"Paon Mein Jhanjar Jhanjar Mein Ghungroo"	Asha Bhosle
"Yad Toree Aayee"	Asha Bhosle
"Yahan To Kate Mauj Se Zindagi"	Asha Bhosle
"O Matware Sajna"	Asha Bhosle
