= Awara Abdulla =

Awara Abdullah
- Directed by: Tara Harish
- Written by: K.B. Pathak
- Produced by: Bany Talwar, M R Kirpal
- Cinematography: Haren Bhatt
- Edited by: P.S. Wagle
- Music by: N. Dutta
- Production company: Hanna Films
- Release date: 30 December 1963
- Country: India
- Language: Hindi

Awara Abdullah is a 1963 Bollywood adventure film starring Dara Singh and Helen.

== Cast ==
- Dara Singh
- Chandrashekhar
- Helen
- Randhawa
- Master Bhagwan

== Music ==
Song-title	Singer(s)
"Hum Hai Awara To Kya Hai"	Mohammed Rafi, Geeta Dutt
"Ho Awara Abdullah Yeh Pyar Ka Halla Gulla"	Mohammed Rafi, Geeta Dutt
"Dil Hai Zaalim Nigaho Ka Mara"	Usha Mangeshkar, Asha Bhosle
"Kabhi Meharbani Kabhi Badgumani"	Asha Bhosle
"Kahan Se Layega, Ye Husn Ye Shbab Koi"	Asha Bhosle
