= Sultana Daku (1972 film) =

- Poster
- Directed by: Mohammed Hussain
- Starring: Helen Jairag Richardson and Dara Singh
- Music by: Madan Mohan
- Release date: 1972
- Country: India
- Language: Hindi

Sultana Daku is a 1972 Bollywood drama film directed by Mohammed Hussain. The film stars Helen Jairag Richardson and Dara Singh. This movie is based on a person named Sultana who fought against British imperialists.

== Cast ==
- Dara Singh
- Ajit
- Helen

== Music ==
Song	Singer
"Humko Bhi Munna Dila De Uparwale"	Mohammed Rafi, Asha Bhosle
"Tune Dil Mera Churaya Hai"	Asha Bhosle
"Bhor Hote Balam Chale"	Asha Bhosle
"Aake Apni Suratiya"	Asha Bhosle
