= Daku Mangal Singh =

- Directed by: Chand
- Written by: Mahesh Kumar
- Produced by: Bany Talwar
- Starring: Dara Singh; Mumtaz
- Cinematography: B. Gupta
- Music by: Laxmikant–Pyarelal
- Release date: 1966
- Country: India
- Language: Hindi

Daku Mangal Singh is a Bollywood action movie directed by Chand and starring Dara Singh, Mumtaz and Prithviraj Kapoor. The film was released in 1966 under the banner of Pinky Films.

== Cast ==
- Dara Singh as Daku Mangal Singh / Kumar
- Mumtaz as Princess Aruna
- Prithviraj Kapoor
- Bela Bose as Courtesan
- Padma Chavan

== Soundtrack ==
Track#	Title	Singer(s)
1	"Ek To Ye Bahar"	Lata Mangeshkar
2	"Aaya Holi Ka Tyohar"	Mohammed Rafi, Shamshad Begum
3	"Sone Ke Tere Jhumke"	Mohammed Rafi, Usha Khanna
4	"Pyaar Kiya Hai Humne Jise"	Asha Bhosle
5	"Ankhon Ke Saamne"	Lata Mangeshkar
