= Chitta Lahu =

1932 novel by Nanak Singh

- Author: Nanak Singh
- Original title: ਚਿੱਟਾ ਲਹੂ
- Translator: punjabi
- Language: Punjabi
- Genre: novel
- Publication date: 1923 1932.

Chitta Lahu (Punjabi: ਚਿੱਟਾ ਲਹੂ) is a Punjabi novel written by Punjabi novelist Nanak Singh. It was first published in 1932. The novel was translated into Russian by Natalia Tolstaya (She was Tolstoy by marriage. Her husband was unrelated to Leo Tolstoy, though). Her maiden family name was Terentyeva. In his novel Chitta Lahu (White Blood), Singh writes, "It seems to imply that in the lifeblood of our society, red corpuscles have disappeared." Nanak Singh's grandson, Dilraj Singh Suri, has translated Chitta Lahu into English (titled White Blood).
