= Hari Darshan =

- Directed by: Chandrakant
- Starring: Dara Singh
- Music by: Kalyanji Anandji
- Distributed by: Friends video(Atul Sharma)
- Release date: 1972
- Country: India
- Language: Hindi

Hari Darshan is a 1972 Indian Hindi-language mythological film directed by Chandrakant. The film stars Dara Singh and other artists of Indian film Industry, who portray different characters during the time of Bhakt Prahlad. The story revolves around the devotee Prahlad. It also show cases different Avtars (incarnations) of lord Shri Hari Vishnuji.

== Cast ==
- B. Saroja Devi as Maharani Kayadhu
- Randhawa as Maharaj Hiranyakashipu
- Satyajeet Puri as Child Rajkumar Prahlada
- Mehmood
- Mehmood Junior as Jamure
- Jayshree Gadkar as Devi Lakshmi
- Dara Singh as Bhagwan Shiva
- Sujatha as Holika
- Abhi Bhattacharya as Bhagwan Vishnu

== Soundtrack ==
#	Title	Singer(s)
1	"Jai Jai Narayan"	Lata Mangeshkar
2	"Apna Hari Hai Hazar Haathwala"	Lata Mangeshkar
3	"Idhar Bhi Ishwar Udhar Bhi"	Poornima, Hemlata, Kamal Barot
4	"Jai Jai Narayan"	Mahendra Kapoor, Lata Mangeshkar
5	"Karo Hari Darshan"	Mahendra Kapoor
6	"Maarnewala Hai Bhagwan"	Lata Mangeshkar
7	"Prabhu Ke Bharose"	Lata Mangeshkar
8	"Hari Naam Dhun"	Lata Mangeshkar
