= Munda Rockstar =

2024 Indian Punjabi-language film

- Directed by: Satyajeet Puri
- Screenplay by: Satyajeet Puri; Navdeep Moudgill
- Story by: Satyajeet Puri
- Produced by: Sanjay Jalan; Abhishek Jalan
- Starring: Mohammad Nazim; Yuvraj Hans; Aditi Aarya
- Cinematography: Parv Dandona
- Edited by: Prashant Singh Rathore
- Music by: Jaidev Kumar; Gopi Sidhu Lyricist
- Release date: 12 January 2024
- Country: India
- Language: Punjabi

Munda Rockstar (Punjabi: ਮੁੰਡਾ ਰੌਕਸਟਾਰ) is an Indian Punjabi-language film directed by Satyajeet Puri. The film stars Mohammad Nazim, Yuvraj Hans and Aditi Aarya.

== Soundtrack ==
All lyrics were written by Gopi Sidhu, and all music was composed by Jaidev Kumar

== Cast ==
- Mohammad Nazim as Yuvi the Rockstar
- Yuvraj Hans as Sunny Randhawa
- Gopi Sidhu
- Satyajeet Puri

== Filming ==
The film is mostly shot in Punjab, Himachal Pradesh and Mumbai, Maharashtra, India.
