= Hum Sub Chor Hain (1973 film) =

- Directed by: Marutirao Parab
- Written by: H. M. Singh; Subhash Babbar; S. N. Ajeeb; Afzal Irshad
- Produced by: A. V. Mohan
- Starring: Dara Singh; Sheikh Mukhtar
- Cinematography: Shankar Palav
- Edited by: Waman Rao
- Music by: Usha Khanna
- Distributed by: Sangam Films
- Release date: 9 January 1973
- Country: India
- Language: Hindi

Hum Sub Chor Hain (transl. We are all Thieves), also known as The Criminals, is a 1973 Hindi crime action film directed by Marutirao Parab. The film stars Dara Singh and Sheikh Mukhtar in the lead roles. The film was released on 9 January 1973 and certified U by the Central Board of Film Certification.

== Cast ==
- Dara Singh as Mohan
- Sheikh Mukhtar as Shaikh
- Shabnam as Sheela
- Hiralal as Ram Singh / Shyam Singh
- Jagdish Raj as Police Inspector Jagdish
- Daljeet as Ramesh
- Kundan as Manohar
- M.B. Shetty as Shankar
- Satyajeet as Raju
- Roopali as Mental Hospital Inmate
- Jayshree T. as Qawwali Singer
- Saudagar Singh as Ram Singh's Goon
- Trilok Singh as Ram Singh's Goon
- Mohan Jerry as The King of Chandanpur

== Reception ==
Film historian Valentina Vitali described the film as "cheap urban action films" in which Singh starred.

== Soundtrack ==
The music was composed by Usha Khanna. Lyrics by Indivar, Asad Bhopali, Jan Nisar Akhtar

1. "Aaja Mere Saathi" - Asha Bhosle
2. "Dekhoon Kisko Chahoon Kisko" - Asha Bhosle
3. "Dil Humaara Ki Heere Se Kuchh KumNa Tha" - Krishna Kalle, Usha Khanna, Manhar Udhas, Mahendra Kapoor
4. "Panchhi Pinjare Mein Roye" - Hemlata, Suman Kalyanpur
5. "Tu Nahin Jaane" - Usha Khanna
