= Mahaprasthaner Pathey =

1952 Bengali film

- Directed by: Kartick Chattopadhyay
- Produced by: New Theatres
- Starring: Vasant Choudhury; Arundhati Mukherjee; Abhi Bhattacharya; Kamal Mitra
- Music by: Pankaj Mullick
- Distributed by: Aurora Film Corporation
- Release date: 9 May 1952
- Language: Bengali

Mahaprasthaner Pathey is a Bengali drama film directed by Kartick Chattopadhyay, produced by New Theatres based on the same name novel of 1944 by Probodh Kumar Sanyal. The film was released on 9 May 1952 under the banner of Aurora Film Corporation. Hindi-language version of this film Yatrik was also released in 1952. Music director of the film was Pankaj Kumar Mullick. Arundhati Devi made her cinematic debut in this film.

== Plot ==
A group of pilgrims begins a dangerous journey through the Himalayas toward Kedarnath and Badrinath. Among them, Probodh is a thoughtful writer, during the harsh journey, he writes travelogue about the spiritual doubt of people, their emotional conflicts and discover the meaning of human life.

== Cast ==
- Basanta Choudhury as Prabodh Kumar
- Arundhati Devi as Rani
- Tulsi Chakrabarti
- Abhi Bhattacharya
- Kamal Mitra
- Molina Devi
- Sisir Batabyal
- Nitish Mukhopadhyay
