= Jai Radhe Krishna =

- Directed by: Yeshwant Pethkar
- Produced by: Gajanan P. Shirke
- Starring: Jayshree T.; Mohan Choti; Satyajeet; Anupama
- Music by: Vasant Desai
- Release date: 1974
- Country: India
- Language: Hindi

Jai Radhe Krishna is a 1974 Bollywood devotional film directed by Yeshwant Pethkar. Music was composed by Vasant Desai with lyrics by Yogesh Gaud. The film stars Mohan Choti, Satyajeet, Anupama, Jayshree T. and S. N. Tripathi.
