= Jai Mata Di =

1977 Punjabi film by Daljit

Jai Mata Di is a 1977 Punjabi devotional film. It was directed by Daljit .

== Cast ==
- Dara Singh as Balbir
- Narendra Chanchal
- Sajid Khan
- Babu Sonu
- Sardar Akhter
- Satyajeet Puri
- Master Vishal
- Mumtaz Begum
- Madhumati
- Kamini
- Tun Tun
- Gulshan Kumar Mehta
- Mirza Mushauff
- Polsan
- Saudagar Singh
- Jugnu
- Kamaljeet Sona

== Music ==
Music by Hansraj Behl Playback Singer - Aasha Bhonsle, Mahendra Kapoor, Minu Purshotum, Dilraj Kaur, S. Balbeer, Hira Lala & Narendra Chanchal
