= Satyajeet Puri =

Indian actor

- Born: 25 September 1960 (age 65); Mumbai, Maharashtra, India
- Occupation: Actor
- Years active: 1966–present
- Spouse: Reeta Puri
- Children: 2
- Father: Daljeet Puri
- Relatives: Puneet Issar (brother-in-law)

Satyajeet Puri (born 25 September 1960) is an Indian actor working in the Hindi film industry. He started his career as a child artist with Satyen Bose–directed Mere Lal, released in 1966.

== Personal life ==
Satyajeet Puri, son of actor-director Daljeet Puri graduated from Mithibai College. He is married to a Sindhi lady, Rita, and the couple has two children Vedantika Puri and Shivnash Puri. His younger sister, Deepali Issar, is married to actor-director Puneet Issar.

== Career ==
Satyajeet, a popular child star in the 70s, has been a part of some wonderful films. His debut film is Mere Lal released in 1966. Some of his earlier films are Wapas (1969) and Khilona (1970). Some of his famous works include Anuraag (1972), Hari Darshan (1972), Bidaai (1974), Paheli (1977), etc. As an adult he worked in Arjun' (1985), Khoon Bhari Maang (1988), Shola Aur Shabnam (1992), Dulaara (1994), Zameer (1997), etc.

He is credited as Master Satyajeet, Master Satyajit, Satyajeet Puri, Satyajit Puri, Satyajeet or Satyajit in cast credits of his movies.

Satyajeet is making a film on life of Indian hockey legend Major Dhyan Chand. Shahrukh Khan is likely to be cast as Dhyan chand.

== Filmography ==
- Mere Lal (1966) ...... Pappu
- Wapas (1969) ...... Anil
- Nanak Dukhiya Sub Sansar (1970 film)......as young Kartar Singh
- Khilona (1970) ...... Pappu
- Sansar (1971) ...... Chandan
- Hare Rama Hare Krishna (1971) ...... young Prashant
- Ganga Tera Pani Amrit (1971) ...... young Dinesh
- Anuraag (1972) ...... Chandan
- Hari Darshan (1972) ...... Bhakt Prahlad
- Shor (1972) ...... Deepak
- Shaadi Ke Baad (1972) ...... Chabiley
- Mere Bhaiya (1972) ...... young Subhash
- Narad Leela (1972) ...... Bal Narad
- Samadhi (1972) ...... young Jaswant
- Baharon Phool Barsao (1972)
- Joshila (1973) ...... Ravi
- Pyar Ka Rishta (1973) ......
- Sabak (1973) ...... Subhash
- Jugnu (1973) ...... young Ashok
- The Criminals / Hum Sab Chor Hain (1973) ...... Raju
- Balak Dhruv (1974) ...... Bhakt Dhruv
- Dastan-E-Laila Majnu (1974) ...... young Kais
- Bidaai (1974) ...... Krishna
- Har Har Mahadev (1974) ...... Bal Ganesh
- Jai Radhe Krishna (1974) ...... Shri Krishna
- Ishk Ishk Ishk (1974) ...... Gambhir
- Dharam Karam (1975) ...... young Dharam
- Maya Machhindra (1975) ...... Gorakhnath
- Rakshaa Bandhan (1976) ...... Naag Bhai
- Chacha Bhatija (1977) ...... young Shankar
- Jagriti (1977) ......
- Tyaag (1977) ...... teenage Pappu
- Paheli (1977) ...... Montu
- Gopal Krishna (1979) ...... Balraam
- Ayaash (1982) ...... Naresh
- Raja Jogi (1983) ......
- Arjun (1985) ...... Mohan
- Anadi Khiladi (1986) ...... Vikram
- Dacait (1987) ...... Ahmed
- Kachchi Kali (1987)
- Kaun Jeeta Kaun Haara (1987) ...... Rajesh
- Khoon Bhari Maang (1988) ...... Baliya
- Hathyar (1989) ...... Pakya
- Tridev (1989) ...... Inspector Tripathi
- Fateh (1991) ...... Ranvir
- Shola Aur Shabnam (1992) ...... Satya
- Ghazab Tamasha (1992) ...... Dev
- Police Officer (1992) ...... Inspector Yadav
- Jaagruti (1992) ...... Adivasi (Tribal Man)
- Dulaara (1994) ...... Deepak
- Hanste Khelte (1994) ...... Amit
- Fauj (1994) ...... Nagesh
- Zameer (1997) ...... Satyakam
- Ghayal Once Again (2016) ...... Ajay's Friend

=== Regional filmography ===
Film	Year	Role	Language
Nanak Dukhiya Sub Sansar	1970	as young Kartar Singh	Punjabi
Khamma Mara Veera	1976	Naag Bhai	Gujarati
Jai Mata Di	1977		Punjabi
Shaheed Kartar Singh Sarabha	1977	Kartar Singh	Punjabi
Mhari Pyari Chanana	1983	Ramu	Rajasthani
Munda Rockstar	2024		Punjabi
Munda Rockstar	TBA	TBA	Punjabi

== See also ==
- List of Indian film actors
