= Bajrangbali (film) =

- Poster
- Directed by: Chandrakant
- Produced by: Chandrakant
- Starring: Dara Singh
- Music by: Kalyanji-Anandji; Pradeep (lyrics)
- Distributed by: Digital Entertainment
- Release date: 22 September 1976
- Running time: 170 minutes
- Country: India
- Language: Hindi

Bajrangbali is a 1976 Indian Hindi-language Mythological film directed and produced by Chandrakant. Dara Singh plays the lead role of Hanuman.

== Cast ==
- Dara Singh as Bajrangbali/Hanuman
- Biswajeet as Rama
- Moushumi Chatterjee as Sita
- Shahi Kapoor as Lakshmana
- Durga Khote as Devi Maa Anjani
- Ajay as Luv
- Master Alankar as Kush
- Dulari as Shabari
- Prem Nath as Ravan
- Sumitra Devi as Maharani Mandodari
- Randhawa as Rajkumar Meghnath
- Jayshree Gadkar as Rajkumari Sulochana
- Asit Sen as Kumbhakarna
- Moolchand as Ravan's guard, setting Bajrangbali's tail on fire
- Mehmood as Shakun
- Mukri as Shakun's assistant
- Ram Mohan as Dhobi, washerman
- Polson as Bhagwan Shri Ganesh's devotee
- Jagdish Raj
- Shahu Modak as Maharishi
- Jaya Kausalya

== Soundtrack ==
All lyrics are written by Pradeep; all music is composed by Kalyanji-Anandji.

| No. | Title | Singer(s) | Length |
|---|---|---|---|
| 1. | "Tere Prabhu Jante Hain" | Mahendra Kapoor, Chorus |
| 2. | "He Manwa Re" | Mahendra Kapoor, Chorus |
| 3. | "Hamara Naam Hai Ram Katori" | Asha Bhosle |
| 4. | "He Ram Tere Raj Mein" | Lata Mangeshkar |
| 5. | "Jai Jai Bajrang Bali" | Mahendra Kapoor, Aziz Nazan |
| 6. | "Ab To Aao Dhanush Ke Dhari" | Lata Mangeshkar |
| 7. | "He Maryada Purushottam Bolo" | Lata Mangeshkar, Asha Bhosle |
| 8. | "Kuchh Yaad Karo Apna" | Aziz Nazan |
