= Mumtaz (Indian actress) =

Indian actress (born 1947)

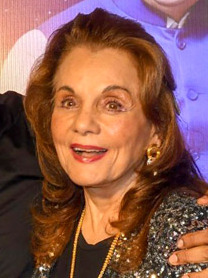
- Mumtaz in 2025
- Born: Mumtaz Askari; 31 July 1947 (age 79); Hyderabad, Hyderabad State, (Now in Telangana, India)
- Occupation: Actress
- Years active: 1958–1977, 1990
- Spouse: Mayur Madhvani (m. 1974)
- Children: 2 (Natasha and Tanya)
- Relatives: Malika (sister); Randhawa (brother-in-law); Shaad Randhawa (nephew); Fardeen Khan (son-in-law)

Mumtaz Askari Madhvani (née Askari; born 31 July 1947), known mononymously as Mumtaz is an Indian actress who worked in Hindi films. Initially starting out as a child actor and later appearing in B-grade films, she established herself as one of the leading and highest-paid actresses of the late 1960s and early 1970s. Known for portraying feisty, vivacious women on screen in romantic and action dramas, Mumtaz is the recipient of a Filmfare Award and was honoured the Filmfare Lifetime Achievement Award in 1997.

Mumtaz made her acting debut at age 11 with Lajwanti (1958), Sone Ki Chidiya (1958), and did smaller roles in films like Stree (1961) and Sehra (1963). Mumtaz was typecast as a "stunt film heroine", with Faulad (1963) and Daku Mangal Singh (1966), which stalled her career. After being praised for her work in Ram Aur Shyam (1967), Mere Hamdam Mere Dost (1968) and Brahmachari (1968), Mumtaz had her career breakthrough with Do Raaste (1969). She went on to establish herself as one of the leading actress with films such as Bandhan (1969), Aadmi Aur Insaan (1969), Sachaa Jhutha (1970), Khilona (1970), which won her the Filmfare Award for Best Actress, Tere Mere Sapne (1971), Hare Rama Hare Krishna (1971), Apna Desh (1972), Loafer (1973), Jheel Ke Us Paar (1973), Chor Machaye Shor (1974), Aap Ki Kasam (1974), Roti (1974) and Prem Kahani (1975).

After this, she went on a sabbatical of 13 years, with the 1990 film Aandhiyan, marked her final film appearance before retirement. Since she retired from acting, Mumtaz has settled in London with her husband, Ugandan businessman Mayur Madhvani with whom she has two daughters. She has been an advocate for breast cancer survivors and has appeared in the 2010 documentary 1 a Minute.

== Early life ==
Mumtaz Askari was born to Abdol Samad Askari (a dry fruits vendor) and Shadi Habib Agha who hailed from Mashhad, Iran. Her father hailed from a family of imams. Her parents got divorced just one year after she was born. Her elder sister is actor Mallika who was married to wrestler and Indian actor Randhawa – younger brother of wrestler and actor Dara Singh.

== Career ==
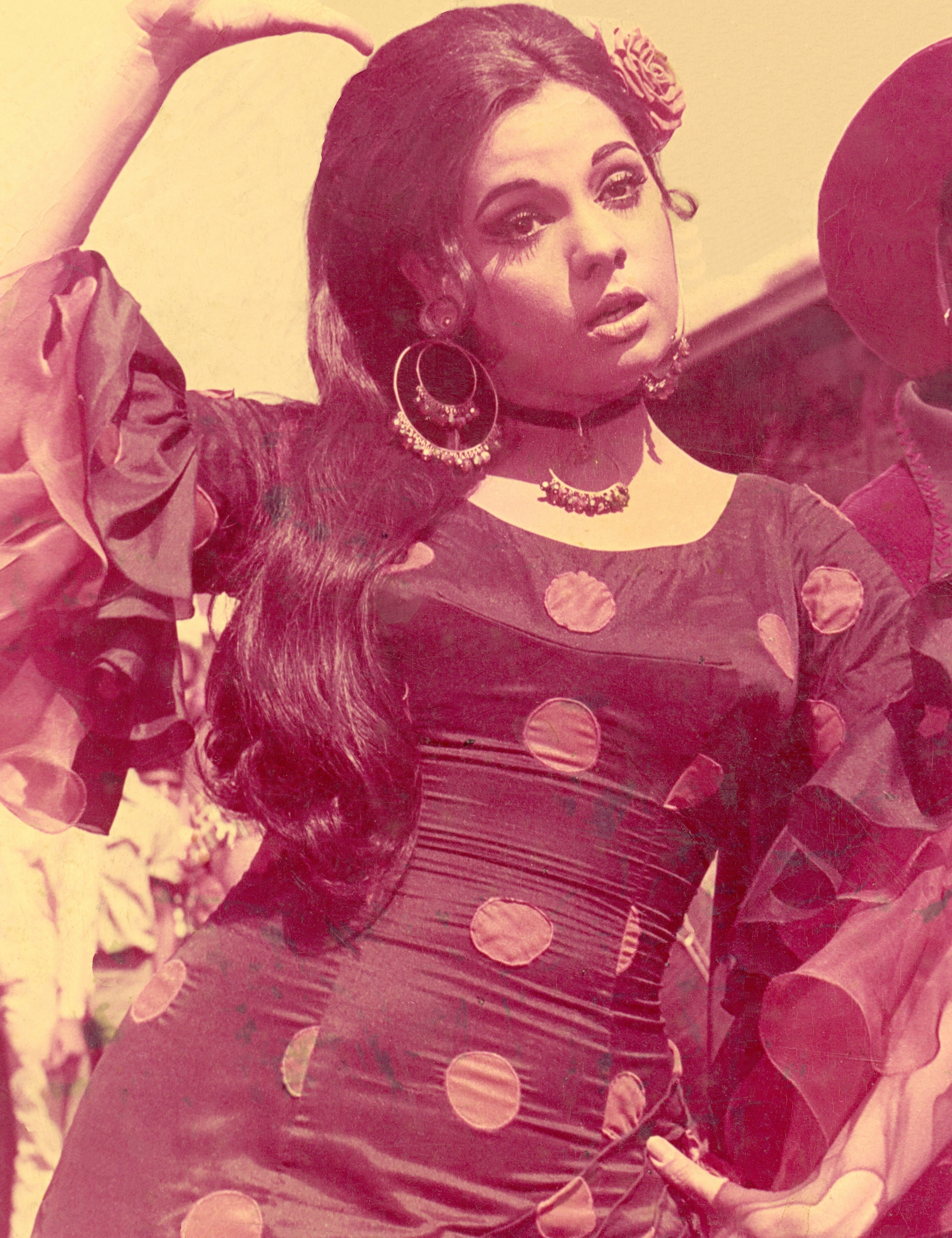
Mumtaz in a film

Mumtaz appeared as a child actress in Sone Ki Chidiya (1958). As a teenager she acted as an extra in Vallah Kya Baat Hai, Stree and Sehra in the early 1960s. As an adult, her first role in A-grade films was that of the hero's sister in O. P. Ralhan's Gehra Daag. She got small roles in successful films such as Mujhe Jeene Do. Later, she got the role of the main lead heroine in 16 action films, including Faulad, Veer Bhimsen, Tarzan Comes to Delhi, Sikandar-E-Azam, Rustom-E-Hind, Raaka, and Daku Mangal Singh, with freestyle wrestler Dara Singh, and was labelled as a stunt-film heroine. In the films that Dara Singh and Mumtaz did together, Dara's remuneration was INR 450,000 per film, and Mumtaz's salary was INR 250,000 per film.

She received her only nominations for the Filmfare Award for Best Supporting Actress for her performances in Ram Aur Shyam (1967) and Aadmi Aur Insaan (1969). It took Raj Khosla's blockbuster family drama Do Raaste (1969), starring Rajesh Khanna, to finally make Mumtaz a full-fledged star. Mumtaz had a decorative heroine's role and director Khosla had filmed four songs with her. The film made her popular, and she acknowledged that even though she had a small role, it was one of her most favourite films. Do Raaste and Bandhan, both with Rajesh Khanna, became the top grossers of the year 1969, earning around Rs. 65 million and Rs. 28 million respectively. This was followed by a heroine-oriented role in Khilona in 1970, for which she won her first and only Filmfare Award for Best Actress and was "very happy that the audience accepted her in an emotional role". Her pairing with Rajesh Khanna was the most successful, with a total of 10 films. Mumtaz frequently acted with Feroz Khan and gave hits such as Mela (1971), Apradh (1972) and Nagin (1976). She acted opposite Dharmendra in films such as Loafer and Jheel Ke Us Paar (1973). Shashi Kapoor, who had earlier refused Sachaa Jhutha opposite her because she was a "stunt-film heroine" acted with her in Chor Machaye Shor (1973). Mumtaz quit films after the drama Aaina (1977) to concentrate on her family. She made a comeback 13 years later with Aandhiyan (1990) but retired for good when the movie flopped.

== Personal life ==
Mumtaz was initially engaged to actor Shammi Kapoor but she broke it off as the Kapoors wanted her to give up her career after marriage. She married Ugandan businessman Mayur Madhvani, of Gujarati descent, in 1974. They have two daughters, of whom Natasha married Feroz Khan's son Fardeen Khan in 2006.

Though born into a Muslim family, Mumtaz has stated that she holds faith in Hindu deities, specifically Shiva and Ganesha. She has also expressed her disapproval of polygamy in Islam, citing her happiness with her monogamous marriage to Madhvani, who is a Hindu.

In May 2022, Mumtaz was admitted to Mumbai's Breach Candy Hospital for a stomach infection. She was diagnosed with breast cancer at the age of 54. She reportedly underwent six chemotherapies and 35 radiation sessions before becoming cancer-free.

== Artisty and legacy ==
Mumtaz is regarded as one of the most iconic and greatest actresses of Hindi cinema. During her acting career, Mumtaz carved a niche and became known for her vivaciousness and spontaneity escaping the tag of a stunt film heroine, which initially had stalled her career in the first place. In 2022, she was placed in Outlook India's "75 Best Bollywood Actresses" list. One of the highest paid actress from the late 1960s to mid 1970s, Mumtaz appeared in Box Office India's "Top Actresses" list six times from 1969 to 1974 and topped twice, (1970-1971). Mumtaz was known as a sex symbol during the 1960s and 1970s. She was placed in Times of India's "50 Beautiful Faces" list. Mumtaz is considered among the hottest Bollywood actresses of all time. Dewy glow and draped sari style were some of the style statements of Mumtaz that are still relevant in the fashion world.

== Filmography ==
Year	Title	Role	Notes
1952	Sanskar	Child artist	
1955	Yasmin	Child artist	
1958	Sone Ki Chidiya	Child artist	
1958	Talaq	Child artist	
1958	Lajwanti	Child artist	
1960	Zameen Ke Tare		
1961	Stree		
1962	Vallah Kya Baat Hai	Mala/Kelewali	
1962	Main Shaadi Karne Chala	Lily	
1962	Pathan		
1963	Sehra	Juhi	
1963	Rustom Sohrab	Shehroo	
1963	Mujhe Jeene Do	Farida	
1963	Gehra Daag	Asha	
1963	Faulad	Rajkumari Padma	
1964	Veer Bhimsen		
1964	Samson	Princess Shera	
1964	Qawwali Ki Raat		
1964	Hercules		
1964	Baaghi		
1964	Aandhi Aur Toofan	Mala	
1965	Tarzan Comes to Delhi	Rekha	
1965	Tarzan and King Kong	Sharmila	
1965	Son of Hatimtai		
1965	Sikandar-e-Azam	Cynthia	
1965	Rustom-E-Hind		
1965	Raaka	Kajri	
1965	Mere Sanam	Kamini (Kamo)	
1965	Khandan	Neelima Shyamlal	
1965	Kaajal	Jharna	
1965	Jadui Angoothi		
1965	Hum Diwane		
1965	Do Dil	Albeli	
1965	Boxer	Rita	
1965	Bahu Beti	Savitri	
1966	Pyas	Sudha	
1966	Yeh Raat Phir Na Aayegi	Reeta	
1966	Sawan Ki Ghata	Saloni	
1966	Saaz Aur Awaaz		
1966	Rustom Kaun	Juwala	
1966	Pyar Kiye Jaa	Meena Priyadarshini	
1966	Pati Patni	Kala	
1966	Jawan Mard		
1966	Daku Mangal Singh	Princess Aruna	
1966	Daadi Maa	Seema	
1966	Suraj	Kalavati	
1967	Woh Koi Aur Hoga	Seema	
1967	Ram Aur Shyam	Shanta	
1967	Patthar Ke Sanam	Meena	
1967	Ladka Ladki	Asha	
1967	Hamraaz	Shabnam	
1967	Do Dushman		
1967	CID 909	Reshma	
1967	Chandan Ka Palna	Sadhana	
1967	Boond Jo Ban Gayee Moti	Shefali	
1967	Baghdad Ki Raatein		
1967	Aag	Paro	
1968	Mere Hamdam Mere Dost	Meena	
1968	Jahan Mile Dharti Akash		Unreleased film
1968	Golden Eyes Secret Agent 077	Seema	
1968	Gauri	Geeta	
1968	Vidhana Naach Nachawe		Bhojpuri film
1968	Brahmachari	Roopa Sharma	
1968	Apna Ghar Apni Kahani		
1969	Shart	Sapna Singh	
1969	Mera Yaar Mera Dushman		
1969	Mera Dost		
1969	Jigri Dost	Shobha Das	
1969	Do Raaste	Reena	
1969	Bandhan	Gauri Malikram	
1969	Apna Khoon Apna Dushman		
1969	Aadmi Aur Insaan	Rita	
1970	Sachaa Jhutha	Meena/Rita	
1970	Pardesi	Meena	
1970	Khilona	Chand	Won: Filmfare Award for Best Actress
1970	Humjoli	Meena	Guest appearance
1970	Himmat	Malti	
1970	Ek Nanhi Munni Ladki Thi		
1970	Bhai Bhai	Bijli	
1970	Maa Aur Mamta	Mary	
1971	Mela	Laajo	
1971	Ladki Pasand Hai	Rajni/Rekha/Heerabai	
1971	Kathputli	Nisha	
1971	Ek Nari Ek Brahmachari	Meena	
1971	Chaahat	Sheela	
1971	Upaasna	Shalu Pradhan/Kiran	
1971	Tere Mere Sapne	Nisha Patel/Nisha Kumar	
1971	Hare Rama Hare Krishna	Shanti	
1971	Dushman	Phoolmati	
1972	Tangewala	Paro/Chandika	
1972	Shararat	Radha/Meeta	
1972	Pyaar Diwana	Mamta	
1972	Gomti Ke Kinare	Roshni Das	
1972	Dharkan	Rekha Prasad	
1972	Apradh	Meena/Rita	
1972	Apna Desh	Chanda/Madame Popololita	
1972	Roop Tera Mastana	Princess Usha/Kiran	Double role
1973	Raja Rani	Herself	Guest appearance
1973	Pyaar Ka Rishta	Madhu	
1973	Bandhe Haath	Mala	
1973	Loafer	Anju	
1973	Jheel Ke Us Paar	Neelu	
1974	Chor Machaye Shor	Rekha	
1974	Aap Ki Kasam	Sunita Bhatnagar	
1974	Roti	Bijli	
1974	Aaina	Shalini Shastri	
1975	Prem Kahani	Kamini Sinha	
1975	Lafange	Sapna Dhanraj	
1975	Aag Aur Toofan		
1976	Nagin	Rajkumari	
1990	Aandhiyan	Shakuntala	
2010	1 a Minute	Herself	Docudrama film

== Accolades ==
Year	Award	Category	Film	Result	Ref.
1967	Filmfare Awards	Best Supporting Actress	Ram Aur Shyam	Nominated	
1968	Bengal Film Journalists' Association Awards	Best Supporting Actress (Hindi)	Brahmachari	Won	
1969	Filmfare Awards	Best Supporting Actress	Aadmi Aur Insaan	Nominated	
1971	Filmfare Awards	Best Actress	Khilona	Won	

=== Honours ===
- Filmfare Lifetime Achievement Award in 1997 at the 42nd Filmfare Awards.
- IIFA Lifetime Achievement Award in 2008 at the 9th IIFA Awards.
