= Basanta Choudhury =

Indian actor (1928–2000)

Basanta Chowdhury
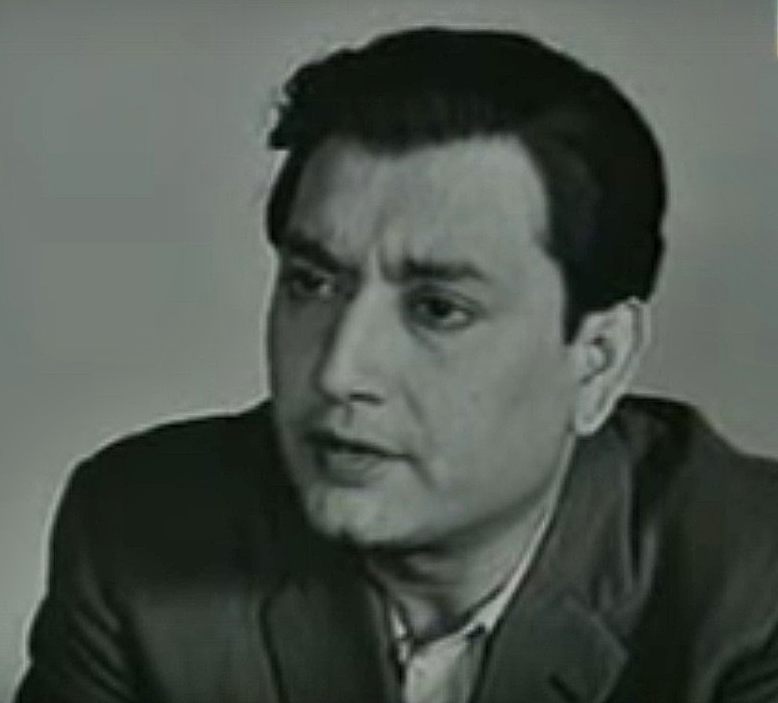
- Basanta Chowdhury
- Born: 5 May 1928; Nagpur, Bombay Province, British India
- Died: 20 June 2000 (aged 72); Calcutta, India
- Education: Deena Nath High School Nagpur
- Occupations: Actor, film producer
- Years active: 1952–1993 (41 years)
- Spouse: Aloka Chowdhury
- Children: 2
- Awards: Best Actor Prize for his film "Raja Rammohan" by B.F.J.A, Bangla Stage Centenary Star Theater award.
- Honours: Sheriff of Kolkata, Chairman of Nandan-West Bengal Film Center.

Basanta Choudhury also known as Basanta Chowdhury (5 May 1928 – 20 June 2000), was an Indian actor in Bengali and Hindi films. He worked with directors Asit Sen, Rajen Tarafdar, Ajay Kar and Bijay Bose, often in leading roles. He was a former Sheriff of Kolkata.

Choudhury's collection of Kashmiri and Persian shawls was enviable. Director Satyajit Ray admired those collections and used them for his masterpieces.

== Birth and childhood ==
Basanta Chowdhury was born into an affluent Kayastha Zamindar Datta Chowdhury family of Andul, Howrah. In circa 1886, his great-great forefather Apurba Krishna Dutta Chaudhuri discontinued the surname 'Dutta' and moved from his ancestral place Andul to Nagpur to practice law. He later became the Law Lecturer in the Morris College (the present-day Vasantrao Naik Government Institute of Arts and Social Sciences (VNGIASS)). His son was Phani Bhusan Chaudhuri, whose son Shiddhish Chandra Chowdhury. Shiddhish and Kamala Devi had two sons – Basanta & Prasanta. Both of them grew up in Nagpur. Basanta graduated from Morris college. In 1945, he completed his Matriculation Examination from Deena Nath High School Nagpur. After shifting to Kolkata, Chowdhury stayed in Ranikuthi in Tollygunge.

He was a numismatist i.e. an expert collector of Ganesha idols, rare coins, paper currency and was a collector of Kashmiri and Persian shawls.

== Family tree and royal seal ==
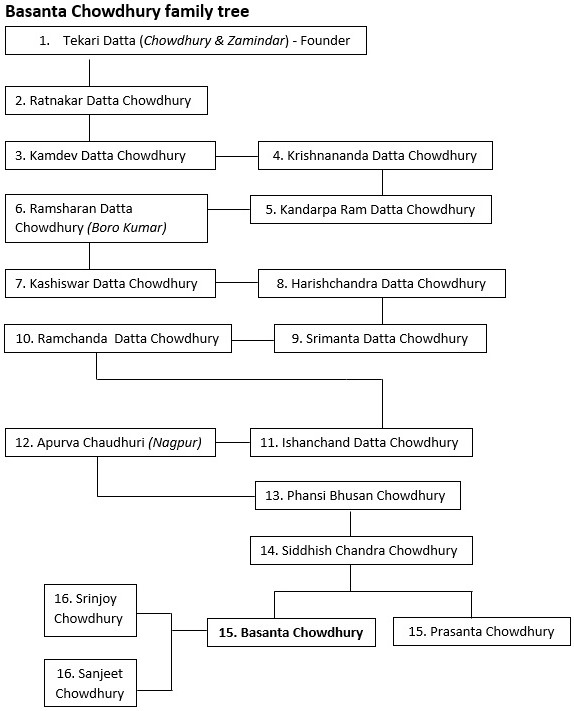
Basanta Chowdhury family tree.

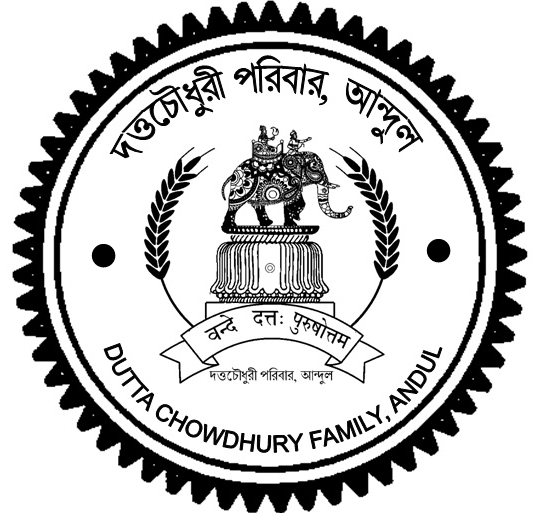
Seal of the Chowdhury family

== Career ==
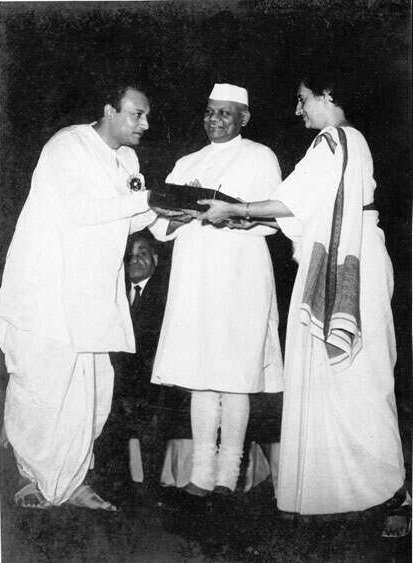
Basanta Chowdhury receiving Bengal Film Journalists' Association – Best Actor Award from then Prime Minister Smt. Indira Gandhi in1966 CE for the movie 'Raja Rammohan'.

His first film was Mahaprasthaner Pathe by director Kartik Chattopadhay in 1952. Some of his memorable films are, Bhagaban Shri Krishna Chaitanya, Jadu Bhatta, Andhare Alo, Deep Jwele Jaai with Suchitra Sen, Anushtoop Chhanda, Abhaya O Srikanta, Raja Rammohan Roy, Diba Ratrir Kabya, Devi Chaudhurani. He was also involved with amateur theater and radio.

== Filmography ==
- 1952: Mahaprasthaner Pathey as Probodh Kumar
- 1952: Yatrik
- 1953: Bhagaban Shrikrishna Chaitanya – Sri Chaitanya
- 1953: Nabin Jatra Safar
- 1954: Jadu Bhatta (Bokul)
- 1955: Bhalobasa
- 1955: Du-janay
- 1955: Devimalini
- 1955: Aparadhi (Pather Sheshey)
- 1956: Shankar Narayan Bank
- 1956: Shubharatri (Chhaya Sangini; Govindadas; Rajpath)
- 1956: Basanta Bahar
- 1957: Harjit
- 1957: Andhare Alo – Satyendra
- 1957: Khela Bhangar Khela
- 1957: Madhumalati
- 1957: Shesh Parichay
- 1958: Jogajog
- 1959: Shashi Babur Sansar
- 1959: Deep Jwele Jaai – Tapash
- 1960: Parakh – Pro. Rajat Sen
- 1960: Khudha
- 1962: Yatrik
- 1962: Bodhu
- 1962: Agnisikha
- 1962: Nav Diganta
- 1962: Sancharini
- 1963: Shreyasi
- 1964: Kashtipathar
- 1964: Anustup Chhanda
- 1965: Alor Pipasa
- 1965: Abhaya O Srikanta – Srikanta
- 1965: Gulmohar
- 1965: Raja Rammohun – Raja Rammohan Roy
- 1965: Eki Ange Eto Rup
- 1966: Uttar Purush
- 1966: Sankha Bela
- 1966: Susanta Sha
- 1969: Rahgir
- 1970: Megh Kalo
- 1971: Pratham Pratisruti – Raam Kaali
- 1971: Grahan
- 1974: Pranta Rekha
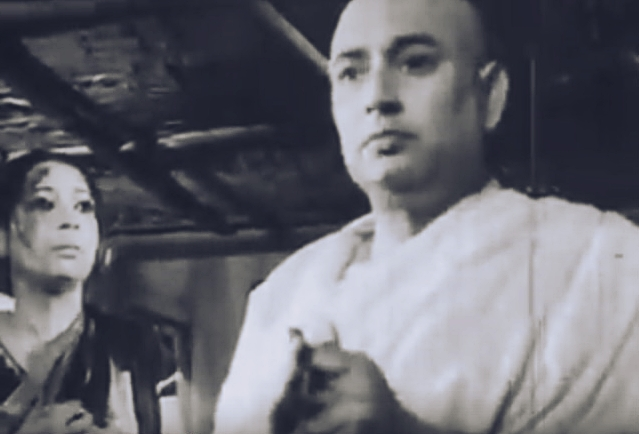
- Basanta Chowdhury and Suchitra Sen in the movie Devi Chaudhurani in 1974 AD.
  1974: Jadi Jantem
- 1974: Sangini
- 1974: Debi Chaudhrani – Bhabani Pathak
- 1975: Nishi Mrigaya
- 1975: Khudha
- 1976: Sankhabish
- 1977: Babu Moshai
- 1978: Parichay
- 1978: Mayuri
- 1979: Chirantan
- 1979: Jiban Je Rakam
- 1979: Heerey Manik
- 1980: Bhagya Chakra
- 1981: Kalankini
- 1982: Sonar Bangla
- 1983: Indira (1983 film)
- 1983: Deepar Prem
- 1985: Putulghar
- 1985: Baidurya Rahasya
- 1987: Antarjali Jatra – Yashobati's Father
- 1987: Maha Yatra
- 1988: Antaranga
- 1988: Sankhachur
- 1990: Sankranti
- 1990: Raktorin
- 1990: Ek Doctor Ki Maut – Dr. Ramanand
- 1991: Raj Nartaki
- 1992: Satya Mithya
- 1992: Hirer Angti
- 1992: Apon Ghar
- 1993: Kacher Prithvi
- 1994: Tabu Mane Rekho
- 1994: Dhusar Godhuli – (final film role)

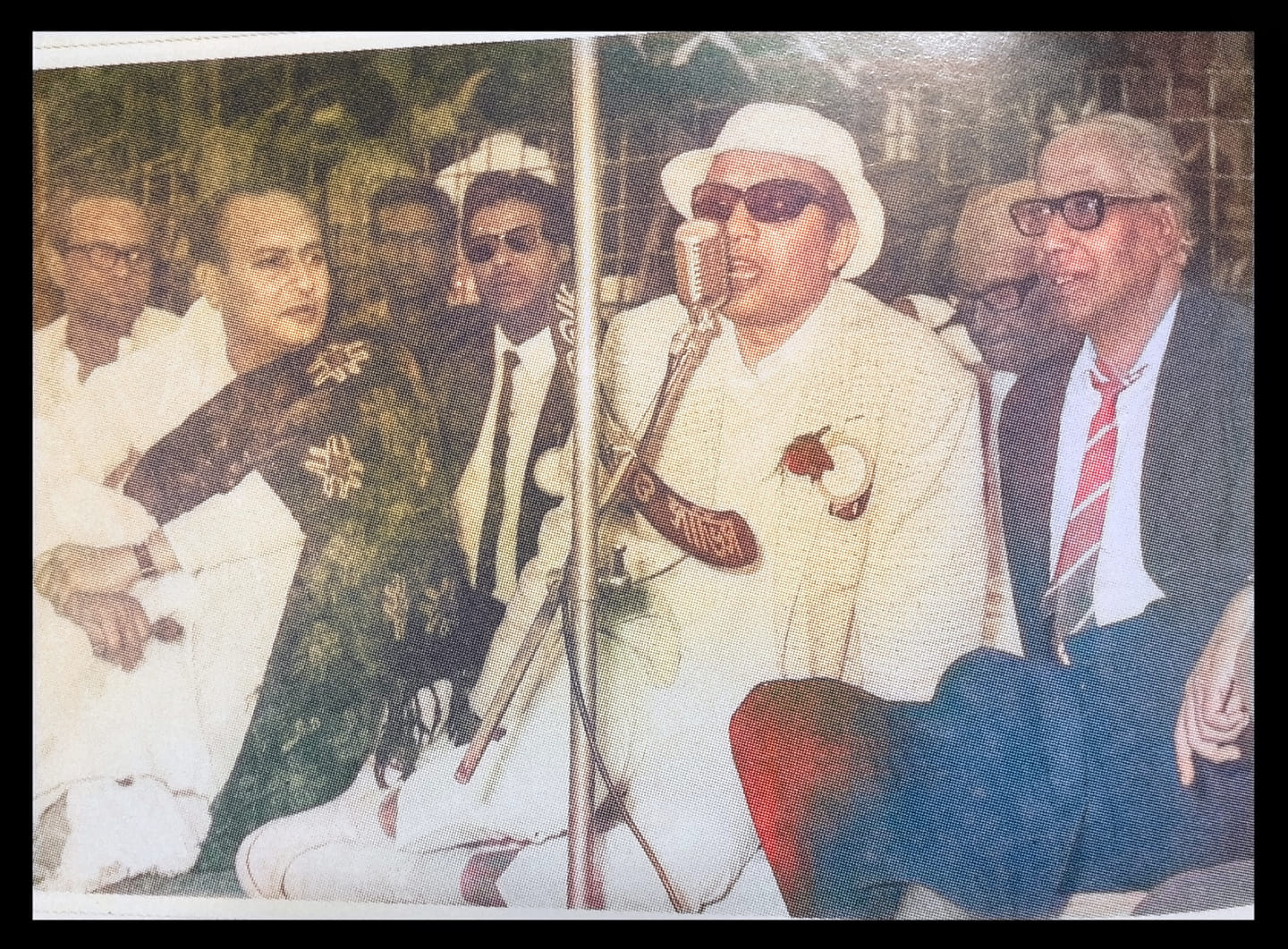
Basanta Chowdhury (left) and Uttam Kumar (right) together sharing a screen in an event.

== Awards ==
In 1965, actor Chowdhury was awarded the Best Actor Prize for his film "Raja Rammohan" by B.F.J.A. In 1996, he also received Bangla Stage Centenary Star Theater award from Calcutta University. He had also acted in several Hindi films.

The actor had been the Sheriff of Kolkata. He was also appointed the Chairman of Nandan-West Bengal Film Centre in Kolkata.

== Death ==
The actor suffered from lung cancer for quite some time. He died on 20 June 2000 in Kolkata.
