= Prem Dhawan =

Hindi film lyricist (1923-2001)

- Born: 13 June 1923; Ambala, Punjab, British India
- Died: 7 May 2001 (aged 77); Mumbai, Maharashtra, India
- Occupations: Lyricist, composer
- Known for: Bollywood music
- Spouse: Uma
- Family: Shyamlee Dhawan (Daughter)
- Awards: Padma Shri; National Film Award for Best Lyrics

Prem Dhawan (13 June 1923 – 7 May 2001) was an Indian lyricist, music composer, choreographer and actor of Bollywood known for his patriotic songs, especially for the lyrics and compositions for the 1965 Manoj Kumar starrer, Shaheed. He was the winner of the National Film Award for Best Lyrics in 1971 and was honoured by the Government of India in 1970 with Padma Shri, the fourth highest Indian civilian award.

== Biography ==
Prem Dhawan was born on 13 June 1923 at Ambala in the present day Haryana state of India to a Jail Superintendent working for the British government. He did his college studies in Lahore during which period he was involved with the activities of the Communist party of India. He started his career in Lahore in 1946 as Assistant of Composer Khwaja Khurshid Anwar in Khwaja Ahmad Abbas's film Aaj Aur Kal. He later moved to Mumbai to join the Indian People's Theatre Association. His association with the Indian People's Theatre Association helped him to learn classical music under the renowned classical musician, Ravi Shankar. In 1946, he debuted as a lyricist with the movie, Dharti Ke Lal, the first of the several till his last film, the Hindi version of Apoorva Sagodharargal, in 1989. In between, he wrote lyrics for a string of films such as Aaram, Tarana, Aasman, Shola Aur Shabnam, Kabuliwala, Ek Phool Do Mali and Purab Aur Pachhim. He also composed music for several films like Shaheed, which was reported to have enhanced the status of Dhawan and the lead actor of the film, Manoj Kumar. The film featured some of the hits of the time in Ae Watan Ae Watan and Mera Rang De Basanti Chola.

Dhawan, apart from his career as a lyricist and composer, acted in a few films such as Lajawab (1950) and Goonj Uthi Shehnai (1959). He also worked as a choreographer for seven films (Vachan was the first film as choreographer), though not with much success. The Government of India awarded him the civilian honour of Padma Shri in 1970. He won the National Film Award for Best Lyrics in 1971 for the film, Nanak Dukhiya Sub Sansar. His career faded towards the eighties and did not have any notable contribution except for the 1989 dubbed movie, Apoorva Sagodharargal. He died on 7 May 2001, at the age of 77, following a cardiac arrest.

== As a lyricist ==
- Appu Raja (1989)
- Do Dil Deewane (1980)
- Guru Manio Granth (1977)
- Sawa Lakh Se Ek Ladaun (1976)
- Kisan Aur Bhagwan (1974)
- Purab Aur Paschim (1970)
- Geet (1970)
- Pavitra Paapi (1970)
- Nanak Dukhiya Sub Sansar (1970) punjabi movie
- Mera Naam Joker (1970)
- Ek Phool Do Mali (1969)
- Dus Lakh (1966)
- Shaheed (1965)
- Adhi Raat Ke Baad (1965)
- Darasingh: Ironman (1964)
- Shabnam (1964)
- Cobra Girl (1963)
- Vallah Kya Baat Hai (1962)
- Ma Beta (1962)
- Kabuliwala (1961)
- Zabak (1961)
- Tel Malish Boot Polish (1961)
- Shola Aur Shabnam (1961)
- Guest House (1959)
- Heera Moti (1959)
- Jagte Raho (1956)
- Taangewali (1955)
- Vachan (1955)
- Aasman (1952)
- Tarana (1951)
- Aaram (1950)
- Jeet (1949)

== As a composer ==
- Raat Ke Andhere Mein (1987)
- The Naxalites (1980)
- Sawa Lakh Se Ek Ladaun (1976)
- Bhagat Dhanna Jatt (1974)
- Kisan Aur Bhagwan (1974)
- Mera Desh Mera Dharam (1973)
- Bharat Ke Shaheed (1972)
- Nanak Dukhiya Sub Sansar (1970)
- Pavitra Paapi (1970)
- Kenner (1968)
- Shaheed (1965)
- Veer Abhimanyu (1965)
- Aadhi Raat Ke Baad (1965)
- Darasingh: Ironman (1964)
- Hindustan Hamara (Documentary - 1950)
- Bharat Ke Shaheed (1972)

== As a choreographer ==
Year	Film
1949	Singaar
1950	Arzoo
1950	Sheesh Mahal
1953	Do Bigha Zamin
1955	Vachan
1957	Naya Daur
1958	Do Phool
1958	Sahara
1959	Dhool Ka Phool
1959	Goonj Uthi Shehnai
1965	Waqt

== As an actor ==
Year	Film	Role
1950	Lajawab	
1953	Ansoo	
1958	Sitaron Se Aage	Dance Master
1959	Goonj Uthi Shehnai	Banjara
