= Bhakti Mein Shakti =

1978 film

- Directed by: Dara Singh
- Written by: Dara Singh
- Produced by: Dara Singh
- Starring: Dara Singh
- Edited by: Ram Khade
- Music by: Sonik Omi
- Release date: 1978
- Country: India
- Language: Hindi

Bhakti Mein Shakti is a 1978 Bollywood religious drama film produced and directed by Dara Singh. It starred Dara Singh, Satish Kaul, Bharat Bhushan, Sunder and Yogeeta Bali in main lead.

== Plot ==
This is the story Dhyanu Bhakt, a heartful devotee of goddess Sherawali. At the time Akbar era, he tries to make a temple unifying two religions.

== Cast ==
- Dara Singh as Dyanu Bhakt
- Satish Kaul as Satish
- Bharat Bhushan as Pandit
- Sunder
- Randhir Kapoor
- Yogeeta Bali
- Birbal as Fazlu
- Mohan Choti
- Jankidas as Pandit
- Om Shivpuri as Akbar Badshah
- Komilla Wirk
- Randhawa as Bandit

== See also ==
- Jwala Ji Kangra
