= Randhawa (wrestler) =

Indian professional wrestler and actor (1933–2013)

- Born: Sardar Singh Randhawa; 1933; Amritsar, Punjab, British India
- Died: 21 October 2013 (aged 79–80); Mumbai, Maharashtra, India
- Occupations: Wrestler, Actor
- Years active: 1952–1988 (wrestler); 1963–1998 (actor)
- Spouse: Malika
- Children: 2 including; Shaad Randhawa
- Family: See Randhawa family

Sardar Singh Randhawa, popularly known as Randhawa (1933 – 21 October 2013), was an Indian professional wrestler and actor. He was the younger brother of wrestler and actor Dara Singh.

== Early life ==
Randhawa was born in 1933 in Dharmuchakk, a village in Amritsar, Punjab to Surat Singh and Balwant Kaur.

== Career ==
=== Wrestling ===
He started his career in wrestling when he arrived in Singapore in 1952. He had a good build and strong body like his brother. During his career he wrestled with wrestlers including Ski Hi Lee, John da Silva and George Gordienko. At the time when Dara Singh became the world champion, Randhawa was the reigning Indian champion.

=== Films ===
He got his first break in Awara Abdulla (1963). Subsequently, he had many small roles in films, most of which were playing villains. One of his most-known roles is that of Bheema in Kurukshetram (1977).

== Filmography ==
Year	Film	Role
1963	Awara Abdulla	Wrestler
1963	Faulad	Amar's tag team partner
1965	Tarzan and King Kong	Tarzan
1965	Teen Sardar	Sherdil
1966	Spy In Goa	
1966	Dilawar	as Dilawar
1966	Do Matwale	as Amar
1966	Shankar Khan	
1965	Panch Ratan	as Raja
1967	Nasihat	Detective
1969	Aadmi Aur Insaan	Shanker
1970	Yeh Khoon Rang Layega	
1970	Johny Mera Naam	Babu
1971	Andaz	as Gangu
1971	Tulsi Vivah	Jalandhara
1972	Hari Darshan	Hiranyakaship
1975	Balak Aur Janwar	Raja Sangraam Singh
1976	Bajrangbali	Meghnad
1978	Bhakti Mein Shakti	Bandit

== Personal life ==
Randhawa was married to Mumtaz's sister Malika and has a son Shaad Randhawa, who is also an actor and a daughter named Shehnaz.

=== Death ===
He died on 21 October 2013 at a hospital in Mumbai.
