= Mera Desh Mera Dharam =

- Directed by: Dara Singh
- Starring: Dara Singh; Raj Kapoor
- Music by: Prem Dhawan (composer and lyrics)
- Release date: 1973
- Country: India
- Language: Hindi

Mera Desh Mera Dharam is a 1973 Bollywood drama film directed by Dara Singh. The film stars Dara Singh and Raj Kapoor.

== Cast ==
- Dara Singh as himself
- Abhi Bhattacharya as DIG Usman Ali Khan
- Kamal Kapoor as Army General
- Raj Kapoor as Dr. Bannerjee
- Meena Rai as Salma
- Mumtaz Begum as Zeenat Begum
- Bhushan Tiwari as Captain Sherdil
- Rammohan Sharma as Mukti Bahini Soldier
- Jayshree Talpade as Club Dancer
- Ratan Aulakh as Mukti-vahini Sipahi

== Soundtrack ==
Prem Dhawan composed and wrote all the songs.

1. "Luta Di Hasino Pe Jawani Luta Di" – Shaminder, Manna Dey
2. "Bhula Raha Tera Vatan Lut Raha Tera Chaman" – Manna Dey
3. "Bhula Raha Tera Vatan Lut Raha Tera Chaman" (version 2) – Manna Dey
4. "Lakho Ussey Salaam" – Asha Bhosle
5. "Matwali Raftar Qayamat Payal Ki Jhankar" – Usha Mangeshkar, Asha Bhosle
6. "Ruk Jaao O Jaani Ruk Jaao" – Asha Bhosle
