= Abhi Bhattacharya =

Indian actor

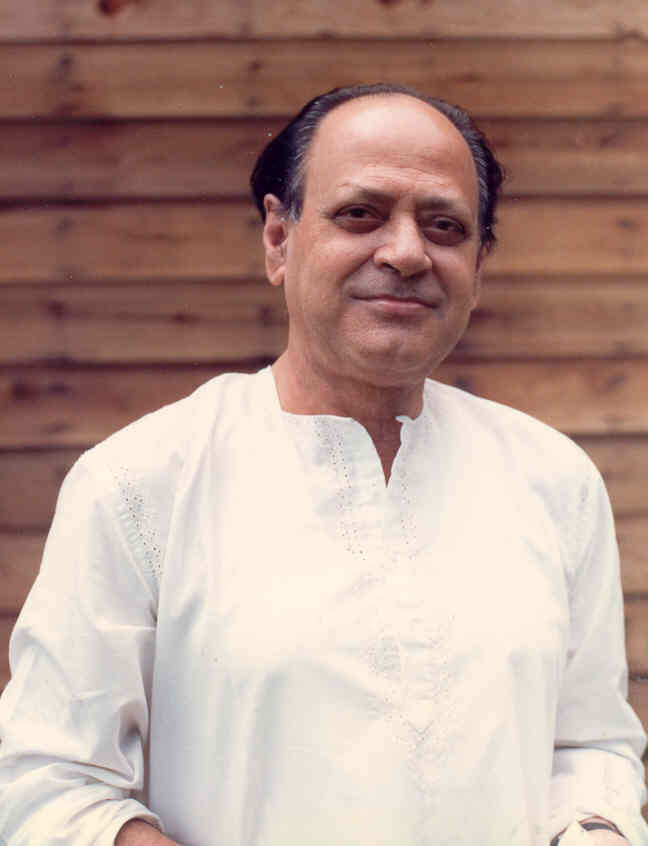
- Bhattacharya in 1984 (Boulder, Colorado)
- Born: 20 November 1921; Rajshahi, Bengal Presidency, British India
- Died: 11 August 1993 (aged 71); Bombay, Maharashtra, India
- Occupation: Actor
- Years active: 1947–1993

Abhi Bhattacharya (20 November 1921 – 11 August 1993) was an Indian actor of Hindi and Bengali cinema, who is most remembered for his roles in films of the 1950s and the 1960s, such as Yatrik (1952), Jagriti (1954), Anuradha (1960), Subarnarekha (1965) and Amanush 1975. In his four decade long acting career he performed in more than 150 films in Hindi and 21 in Bengali. Abhi Bhattacharya worked with eminent film directors of India such as Ritwik Ghatak, Guru Dutt, Bimal Roy and Satyen Bose. He also played the character of Vishnu in Hindi mythological films Hari Darshan and Kisaan aur Bhagwan.

== Film career ==
His film career started when Hiten Chaudhuri asked him to come to Bombay for film related work. While in Bombay he applied for the screen test in response to an advertisement of Bombay Talkies and was selected in the role of hero in "Noukadubi", a film based on a novel by Tagore, directed by Nitin Bose.

Bhattacharya subsequently shifted to Calcutta when Birendranath Sircar of New Theatres invited him to act in the double version film Mahaprasthaner Pathey (1952) (Bengali) / Yatrik Hindi (1952). Around the same time he acted in the film Ratnadeep (1951) (Hindi), directed by Debaki Bose. Tamil version of the film, Ratna Deepam was released subsequently. In 1950s and in 1960s, Abhi Bhattacharya was quite sought after by the directors and producers of the Bombay film industry and he played opposite heroines like Madhubala, Mala Sinha, Geeta Bali, Madhabi Mukherjee. His other memorable films included Biraj Bahu (1954) by Bimal Roy, Jagriti (1954) and Parichay (1954) by Satyen Bose, Naata (1955) by D.N.Madhok, Sailaab (1956) by Guru Dutt, Apradhi Kaun (1957) by Asit Sen, Subarnarekha (film) (1965) in Bangla by Ritwik Ghatak, Netaji Subhas Chandra Bose (1966) by Hemen Gupta. He won Filmfare award (1956) for his role as the Best Supporting actor in the film Jagriti. He worked with the iconic legendary actor Mahanayak Uttam Kumar in 1975 iconic film Amanush directed and produced by Shakti Samanta.

== Religious activism ==
Later in life, around 1971, he gradually began to focus more on spirituality through his association with Dadaji (whose name as a householder was Shri Amiya Roy Chowdhury). Bhattacharya became Dadaji's companion and helped spread his teachings. For about last two decades of his life, whenever Dadaji came to Bombay, Bhattacharya's house at Carter road acted as a rallying point for distinguished people from different walks of life who wanted to meet Dadaji. Abhi Bhattacharya wrote a book, narrating his realisations from experiences with Dadaji, titled Destiny with Dadaji. The book was edited by Ann Mills, who made it public online.

== Filmography ==
- Noukadubi (1947)
- Mahaprasthaner Pathey (1952)
- Yatrik (1952)
- Biraj Bahu (1954)
- Ratna Deepam (1953)
- Jagriti (1954)
- Naata (1955)
- Sailaab (1956)
- Apradhi Kaun? (1957)
- Anuradha (1960)
- Meghe Dhaka Tara (1960)
- Shola Aur Shabnam (1961)
- Raaz Ki Baat (1962)
- Dosti (1964) as Headmaster
- Subarnarekha (1965)
- Mahabharat (1965)
- Kranthiveera Sangolli Rayanna (1966)
- Netaji Subhash Chandra Bose (1966)
- Naunihal (1967)
- Jab Yaad Kisi Ki Aati Hai (1967)
- Dharti Kahe Pukar Ke (1969)
- Aradhana (1969)
- Seema (1971)
- Sansar (1971)
- Amar Prem (1972)
- Seeta Aur Geeta (1972)
- Samadhi (1972)
- Mera Desh Mera Dharam (1973)
- Bhagat Dhanna Jatt (1974)
- Dost (1974)
- Imtihan (1974)
- Amanush (1975)
- Pratigya (1975)
- Do Anjaane (1976)
- Phool aur Insaan (1976) as Thakur Jaimal Singh
- Solah Shukrawar (1977)... Acharya
- Mera Rakshak (1978)
- Dhuan (1981)
- Barsaat Ki Ek Raat (1981)
- Commander (1981)
- Hari Darshan (1982) – Vishnu in various avatars
- Jamuna Kinare (1984) – Pandit Baijnath
- Harishchandra Shaibya (1985)
- Insaniyat Ke Dushman (1987) – Judge
- Woh Din Aayega (1987) as Thakur
- Khooni Darinda (1987) – Jagatguru Sankaracharya, Jailor
- Daku Hasina (1987) – Village School Master
- Khudgarz (1987) - Minister (Special Appearance)
- Sadak Chhap (1987) - Police Commissioner (Special Appearance)
- Hamara Khandaan (1988) - Doctor (Special Appearance)
- Aakhri Badla (1989) - Dr Sen, Scientist
- Kisse Miya Biwi Ke in Ep 13 Hindi Tv Comedy Serial as Priya Tendulkar father
- Zordaar (1996) - Master

== Awards ==
- 1956: Filmfare Best Supporting Actor Award: Jagriti (1954)
