= Dara Singh =

Indian professional wrestler and actor (1928–2012)

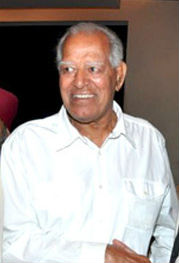
- Singh in 2010
- Born: Deedar Singh Randhawa; 19 November 1928; Dharmuchak, Punjab, British India (present-day Punjab, India)
- Died: 12 July 2012 (aged 83); Mumbai, Maharashtra, India
- Occupations: Professional wrestler; actor; politician
- Years active: 1947–1983 (wrestler); 1950–2012 (actor); 2003–2009 (politician)
- Height: 1.88 m (6 ft 2 in)
- Title: Rustam-e-Hind
- Political party: Bharatiya Janata Party
- Spouses: Bachno Kaur (m. 1942–1952) Surjit Kaur (m. 1961)
- Children: 6, including: Vindu Dara Singh
- Family: See Randhawa family
- Professional wrestling career
- Ring name: Dara Singh
- Billed height: 6 ft 2 in (1.88 m)
- Billed weight: 127 kg (280 lb)
- Billed from: Punjab, India
- Trained by: Harnam Singh
- Debut: 1948
- Retired: 1983

Member of Parliament, Rajya Sabha
- In office 27 August 2003 – 26 August 2009
- Website: dara-singh.com

Dara Singh (born Deedar Singh Randhawa; 19 November 1928 – 12 July 2012) was an Indian professional wrestler, actor, and politician. Widely regarded as one of India's greatest wrestlers, Singh earned international recognition during the 1950s and 1960s for his victories in both Indian and world wrestling circuits. In 1968, Singh became world champion by defeating Lou Thesz.

Transitioning to cinema, Singh appeared in over 100 Hindi and Punjabi films, often portraying strong, heroic and religious characters, and is best remembered for his iconic role as Hanuman in the film Bajrangbali (1976) and in the television series Ramayan (1987–1988). He was the first sportsperson to be nominated as Member of the Rajya Sabha from 2003 to 2009, he was also awarded the Padma Shri in 1996. Singh was inducted into the Legacy wing of the WWE Hall of Fame Class of 2018.

== Early life ==
Singh was born in a Punjabi Jat Sikh family as Deedar Singh Randhawa to Surat Singh Randhawa and Balwant Kaur on 19 November 1928 in the village of Dharmuchak in the Majha area of the Punjab region of India. At the time, it was still under British Raj colonial rule.

== Career ==
=== Professional wrestling ===
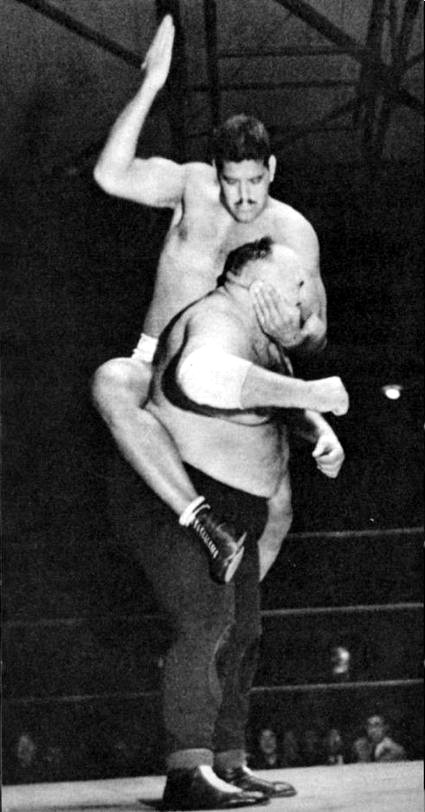
Singh wrestling King Kong at JWA in 1955

He came to Singapore in 1947, where he worked in a drum-manufacturing mill and began his wrestling training under Harnam Singh in the Great World Stadium. As an adult he was 6 feet 2 inches (1.88 m) tall, weighed 127 kilograms (280 lb) and had a chest measurement of 53 inches (130 cm). Due to his physique, he was encouraged to take up pehlwani, a traditional Indian style of wrestling, in which he trained for several years. After switching to professional wrestling, he competed around the world with opponents such as Bill Verna, Firpo Zbyszko, John Da Silva, Rikidōzan, Danny Lynch and Ski Hi Lee. His flooring of King Kong is still remembered. He is credited to have remained undefeated in a professional wrestling bout.

In 1951, Dara Singh lost a traditional city-duel match in Greco-Roman style against Brahmdev Mishra of Gorakhpur in a stadium located at Dharmatala Maidan Calcutta.

In 1954, Dara competed in the Rustam-e-Hind (Champion of India) tournament where he won the final by defeating Tiger Joginder Singh and received a silver cup from Maharaja Hari Singh. In 1959, he won the Commonwealth Championship by defeating George Gordienko at Calcutta. On 29 May 1968 in Bombay, his victory over Lou Thesz earned him the World championship. According to Thesz, Singh was "an authentic wrestler, was superbly conditioned" and had no problem losing to the latter. His last tournament, where he announced his retirement, was held in Delhi in June 1983.

=== Films and television ===
Singh left his village for Singapore in 1948. He made his first on-screen appearance in a dream sequence from the film Pehli Jhalak (1954) where he was seen doing a wrestling scene with Om Prakash with Begum Para as the referee. He was a stunt film actor for many years and played his first lead role in Babubhai Mistry's film King Kong (1962). From around 1963, he partnered often with Mumtaz, with whom he performed in 16 Hindi films. The couple became the highest-paid B-grade actors, with Singh receiving nearly four lakh rupees per film.

He then went on to do television in the late 1980s, where he played the role of Hanuman in the television adaptation of the Hindu epic Ramayan. He also had roles in numerous films, such as Veer Bheem Sen and Ramayan, and in other television serials. He starred as Bhima in various Mahabharata movies, besides also playing Balram, he also starred as Shiva in various theological movies.

His last Hindi movie was Jab We Met and the last Punjabi movie released before his illness was Dil Apna Punjabi. He acted in National Award-winning film Main Maa Punjab Dee directed by Balwant Singh Dullat. He directed seven Punjabi films including Sawa Lakh Se Ek Ladaun, Nanak Dukhiya Sub Sansar, Dhyanu Bhagat and Rab Dian Rakhan. He also directed two films in Hindi; Bhakti Mein Shakti and Rustom (1982), which were produced and directed under the banner "Dara Film" which he set up in 1970. Singh acted as himself in the 1985 Malayalam film Mutharamkunnu P.O..

==== Dara Studio ====
Singh was the owner of Dara Studio at Phase 6, Mohali City, District SAS Nagar, Punjab. Dara Film Studio was founded in 1978. The studio was operational from 1980 as a film studio.

=== Politics ===
Singh joined the Bharatiya Janata Party in January 1998. He became the first sportsperson to be nominated to the Rajya Sabha – the upper house of the Parliament of India. He served in that role between 2003 and 2009. He was also president of the Jat Mahasabha.

=== Comics ===
Singh's son Vindu Dara Singh, launched his first comic book The Epic Journey of the Great Dara Singh at Oxford Bookstore in New Delhi in February 2019.

== Personal life ==
Singh married twice. He had three sons and three daughters, including Vindu Dara Singh. His brother Randhawa was also a wrestler and actor.

== Death ==
Singh was admitted into Kokilaben Dhirubhai Ambani Hospital on 7 July 2012 following a massive heart attack. Two days later, it was confirmed that he had brain damage due to the lack of blood flow. He was discharged from hospital on 11 July 2012, citing that nothing can be done to prolong life, and died the next day at his home in Mumbai. He was cremated at Juhu crematorium.

== Awards and recognition ==
In 1996, Singh was inducted into the Wrestling Observer Newsletter Hall of Fame. He was ranked 94 out of 100 wrestlers for Dave Meltzer's Top 100 Wrestlers of all time in 2002. In 2016, Dara was included in the list India's top wrestlers of all time. On 7 April 2018, WWE inducted him in WWE Hall of Fame Legacy class of 2018.

== Filmography ==
Year	Title	Director	Producer	Notes	Ref.
1970	Nanak Dukhiya Sub Sansar	Yes	No		
1973	Mera Desh Mera Dharam	Yes	No		
1974	Bhagat Dhanna Jatt	Yes	No		
1976	Sawa Lakh Se Ek Ladaun	Yes	No		
1978	Dhyanu Bhagat	Yes	No		
1978	Bhakti Mein Shakti	Yes	Yes		
1982	Rustom	Yes	No		
1985	Mutharamkunnu P.O	No	Yes		

Acting roles
Year	Title	Role	Notes	Ref.
1954	Pehli Jhalak	Wrestler Dara Singh		
1960	Engal Selvi		Tamil film	
1962	King Kong	Jingu / King Kong		
1963	Faulad	Faulad Singh		
1963	Rustom-E-Baghdad	Dara/Rustom-E-Baghdad		
1963	Awara Abdulla	Abdulla		
1964	Samson	Samson		
1964	Aaya Toofan	Deepu		
1964	Jagga	Jagga Daku		
1964	Aandhi Aur Toofan			
1964	Darasingh: Ironman	Dara Singh		
1965	Rustom-E-Hind			
1965	Boxer	Tara		
1965	Tarzan comes to Delhi	Tarzan		
1965	Sher Dil			
1965	Raaka			
1965	Saat Samundar Paar			
1965	Mahabharat	Bheem		
1965	Sikandar-E-Azam	Alexander		
1965	Lootera			
1966	Dulla Bhatti	Dulla Bhatti	Punjabi film	
1966	Naujawan			
1966	Veer Bajrang			
1966	Husn Ka Ghulam			
1966	Dada			
1966	Daku Mangal Singh	Daku Mangal Singh / Kumar	Hindi film	
1966	Jawan Mard			
1967	Chand Par Chadayee			
1967	Do Dushman			
1967	Watan Se Door			
1967	Nasihat			
1967	Sangdil			
1968	Jung Aur Aman			
1968	Balram Shri Krishna	Balram		
1969	Danka			
1969	Thief of Baghdad			
1969	Faulad Ki Aulad			
1969	Toofan	Badal		
1970	Choron Ka Chor	Ashok		
1970	Hudd kar di	Devendra Singh Dhanowa		
1970	Ilzaam	Raju/Kishan		
1970	Mera Naam Joker	Sher Singh		
1970	Nanak Dukhiya Sab Sansar	Kartar Singh	Punjabi film	
1971	Kabhi Dhoop Kabhi Chhaon			
1971	Ramu Ustad	Ramu		
1971	Tulsi Vivah	Bhagwan Shiv		
1971	Anand	Pahalwan		
1972	Aankhon Aankhon Mein	Pahelwan		
1972	Hari Darshan	Bhagwan Shiv		
1972	Lalkaar			
1972	Mele Mitran De		Punjabi film	
1972	Sultana Daku			
1975	Warrant	Pyaara Singh		
1973	Hum Sab Chor Hain			
1973	Mera Desh Mera Dharam			
1974	Kuwara Baap			
1974	Amar Saheed Bhagat Singh	Kaher Singh		
1974	Bhagat Dhanna Jatt	Dhanna Jatt		
1974	Dukh Bhanjan Tera Naam	Daku Daulay Khan		
1974	Har Har Mahadev	Bhagwan Shiv		
1974	Satguru Teri Oat		Punjabi film	
1974	Kisan Aur Bhagwan	Dhanna		
1974	Zehreela Insaan			
1975	Dharam Karam	Ustaad ji		
1975	Dharmatma	Pahelwan		
1976	Bajrangbali	Hanuman		
1976	Lambhardarni	Lambardar/Dharma	Punjabi film	
1976	Raakhi Aur Rifle	Ganga Singh		
1976	Sawa Lakh Se Ek Ladaun	Kartar Singh	Punjabi film	
1976	Apna Khoon Apna Dushman			
1977	Jai Bolo Chakradhari			
1977	Jai Mata Di	Balbir	Punjabi film	
1977	Ram Bharose	Sardar Vikram Singh		
1978	Bhakti Mein Shakti	Dyanu Bhakt		
1978	Dhyanu Bhagat	Dhyanu Bhagat	Punjabi film	
1978	Nalayak	Pahelwan		
1978	Sone Ka Dil Lohe Ke Haath	Nihalchand		
1978	Giddha	Bhalwaan Dulla ji		
1979	Chambal Ki Raani			
1979	Jhoota Kahin Ka	Bodybuilder, Dance partner in Item Song		
1980	Shiv Shakti			
1980	Banmanush			
1981	Guru Suleman Chela Pahelwan			
1981	Khel Muqaddar Ka			
1982	Main Intequam Loonga	Ajay Kumar		
1982	Rustom	Rustom Mangal Singh		
1983	Babul Da Vehra		Punjabi film	
1983	Unkhili Muttiar	Mechanic	Punjabi film	
1984	Maya Bazar	Ghatotkach	Gujarati film	
1984	Aan Aur Shaan			
1985	Mutharamkunnu P.O.	Himself	Malayalam film	
1985	Mard	Raja Azaad Singh		
1985	Vikram Aur Betaal	Virvar	TV; 2 episodes	
1986	Karma	Dharma		
1986	Bulekha			
1986	Krishna-Krishna	Bhagwan Shri Balram		
1986	Ramayan	Hanuman	TV series	
1986	Sajna Sath Nibhana	Joseph		
1986	Maaveeran	Sethupathi	Tamil film adaptation of Mard	
1988	Maula Jatt	Maula Jatt & Dharma		
1988	Paanch Fauladi	Ustadji (Fauladi #1)		
1988	Mahaveera	Delar Singh		
1988	Mahabharat	Hanuman	TV series	
1989	Shehzaade	Jailor		
1989	Elaan-E-Jung	Bheema		
1989	Gharana	Vijay Singh Pahelwan		
1990	Tera Mera Pyar	Preet's father		
1990	Naaka Bandi	Dharam Singh		
1990	Pratiggya	Daku Delavar Singh		
1990	Sheran De Putt Sher	Subedaar		
1991	Dharam Sankat	Dara (the dacoit)		
1991	Ajooba	Maharaja Karan Singh		
1991	Maut Ki Sazaa	Pyara Singh		
1992	Prem Deewane	Loha Singh		
1993	Bechain	Captain Dara		
1993	Anmol	Dara Shamsher, Zafar's father		
1994	Karan			
1995	Ram Shastra	Police Commissioner		
1995	Jai Veer Hanuman	Kesari	TV serial	
1997	Lav Kush	Hanuman		
1997	Main Maa Punjab Dee		Punjabi film	
1998	Guru Gobind Singh			
1998	Auto Driver		Telugu film	
1998	Qahar		Guest appearance	
1999	Dillagi	Veer Singh		
1999	Zulmi	Baba Thakur		
1999	Door Nahin Nankana	Bhakhtawar Singh		
1999	Hudd Kar Di	Devender Singh Dhanwa/Papaji	TV series	
2000	Dulhan Hum Le Jayenge	Sapna's grandfather	Guest appearance	
2001	Farz	Tayaji		
2002	Shararat	Mr. Gujral		
2003	Kal Ho Naa Ho	Pritam Chaddha		
2003	Border Hindustan Ka	Jamail Singh		
2004	Family Business		TV series	
2006	Kyaa Hoga Nimmo Kaa	Amardeep Sehgal (Dadaji)	TV series	
2006	Dil Apna Punjabi	Hardam Singh		
2007	Jab We Met	Suryendra Singh Dhillon		
2012	Ata Pata Lapata		Guest appearance	

== Championships and accomplishments ==
- World Wide Wrestling Association
  - WWWA World Heavyweight Championship
- Maple Leaf Wrestling
  - NWA Canadian Open Tag Team Championship (1 time) - with Yukon Eric
- Indian promotions
  - Commonwealth Championship (1959)
  - World Championship (1968)
  - Champion of Malaysia (1951)
  - Rustam-e-Hind (1954)
  - Rustam-e-Punjab (1966)
- Wrestling Observer Newsletter
  - Hall of Fame (Class of 1996)
- WWE
  - WWE Hall of Fame (Class of 2018)

== Autobiography ==
- Dara Singh Meri Atmkatha (en. My Autobiography by Dara Singh) 1993 Praveen Prakashan
