= Raj (name) =

Raj (Hindi: राज, Urdu: راج, Bengali: রাজ) in different contexts means "rule", "king", "ruler", "emperor" or "royalty" and "power" in various Indo-Aryan languages.

== Given name or nickname ==
- Raj Ballav Koirala (born 1982), Nepalese actor
- Raj Bhakta (born 1975), American politician and businessman
- Raj Gupta, American business executive
- Raj Kamal Jha (born 1966), Indian novelist and journalist
- Raj Kapoor (1924–1988), Indian actor, director and producer
- Raj Khosla (1925–1991), Indian director
- Raj Krishna, Indian economist
- Raj Manhas, American educator
- Raj Man Singh Chitrakar, Nepalese artist
- Raj Mohinder Singh Majitha, Indian politician
- Raj Mukherji, New Jersey lobbyist and real estate developer
- Raj Narain (1917–1986), Indian politician
- Raj Pannu (born 1934), Canadian educator and politician
- Raj Patel (born 1972), British-born academic, journalist, activist and writer
- Raj Pentiah, Mauritian politician
- Rajendra Persaud (born 1963), British psychiatrist, broadcaster, and author
- Raj Pradhan, Nepalese cricketer
- Dabbala Rajagopal Raj Reddy (born 1937), Indian-American pioneer in Computer Science and Artificial Intelligence
- Raj Rajaratnam (born 1957), American former manager of the hedge fund Galleon Group, convicted in 2011 of insider trading
- Raj Rajeshwari Devi (died 1806), queen consort and twice queen regent of Nepal
- Raj Shah (born 1985), American political aide
- Raj Singh (disambiguation), several people
- Raj Thackeray (born 1968), Indian politician

== Surname ==
=== Indian ===
- Anil Raj (1984–2019), American human rights activist, Amnesty International board member, killed in 2019 in Kabul while working on the United Nations Development Programme
- Besant C. Raj (1933–2018), Indian expert and writer on financial management
- Charan Raj (born 1958), Indian film actor, director, music director, film producer, and writer
- Jagdish Raj (1928–2013), Bollywood actor who holds a Guinness World Record for being the most typecast actor
- K. N. Raj (1924–2010), Indian economist
- Maria Venus Raj (born 1988), Filipino beauty queen, TV personality, model, and actress
- Mithali Raj (born 1982), Indian cricketer
- Prakash Raj or Raj (born 1965), Indian actor and producer
- Subhashni Raj (born 1986), Fijian activist
- Rhea Raj (born 2000), American singer-songwriter

=== Hungarian ===
- Ráchel Raj (born 1980), Hungarian Jewish confectioner
- Tamás Raj (1940–2010), Hungarian rabbi and politician

== Fictional characters ==
- Raj Koothrappali, on the American sitcom The Big Bang Theory
- Roger "Raj" Thomas, on the American TV series What's Happening!! and What's Happening Now!!
- Raj, the neurotic Indian elephant on the American cartoon series Camp Lazlo
- Raj, the shop assistant who appears in every one of David Walliams novels except Awful Auntie
- Raj, The friend of Addison Cooke from the Addison Cooke books.
- Raj Malhotra, in the Bollywood movie Dilwale Dulhaniya Le Jayenge
- Raj Patil, in the American television drama Good Trouble
- Raj, one of the contestants in the 2003-2004 seasons of Total Drama
