= Soumi Chatterjee =

Spanish translator from Kolkata, India

- Born: Kolkata
- Occupations: Translator, Project Management
- Known for: Translating El Equilibrista, "Tales of Costa Rica"

Soumi Chatterjee is a Spanish translator from Kolkata, India. Her most famous work was translating El Equilibrista (2009) into English as The Tightrope (2012) for which she received critical praise.

== Early life ==
Her father, Tapan Kumar Chatterjee, was a Merchant Navy officer. Pratima Chatterjee, her mother, is a retired government service employee under the Ministry of Forest and Environment - Port Blair, India.

Chatterjee lived in Port Blair for thirteen years before settling in Kolkata. She completed her higher studies from Carmel Senior Secondary School. She completed her graduation and post-graduate courses from Garden City College, under Bengaluru University. Her graduation studies extended into the frontiers of Chemistry, Genetics and Microbiology, while that of her post-graduate courses was about Biochemistry. Later, she completed her M.Phil studies specializing in Cognitive Neuroscience from Jadavpur University, with the highest rank. The topic of her thesis was an EEG study based on the cognitive functioning in the Frontal lobe of Human Brain when subjected to an Optical illusion.

== Career ==
She began her career as a writer for a scientific journal, working with a start up company. Later she worked as an embryologist in Bhagirathi Neotia Woman & Child Care Center. She then took a sabbatical to continue her education. After completing her degree for M.Phil. in Cognitive Science from Jadavpur University she joined the same university as a Junior Research Fellow and worked in research for almost a year. She then switched her professional path to become the sole Spanish language interpreter for Vodafone Shared Services in India for three years, where she also won the award for category Best Trainer in Foreign Language. She worked as a project manager there.

She lives and works in Pune, Maharashtra, in project management. She was invited as part of the Indian delegation by Federación De Gremios De Editores De España (Federation of Editors' Guild of Spain), to partake as guest in their International Book Fair, LIBER 2023, held in Madrid, Spain. In the same year, she was invited to Seville, Spain as an international guest and part of an Indian delegation to attend the book launch of Dominican Republican journalist and author María Piña.

== Publications ==
Her works of translation include:

- El Equilibrista by Susana Gertopan: co translated by Soumi Chatterjee and released under the name 'The Tightrope' - in collaboration with Embassy of Paraguay in New Delhi, India, in the year 2012.
- Tales of Costa Rica - A collection of short folk tales from Costa Rica, a project done in collaboration with Embassy of Costa Rica, New Delhi, India, in the year 2013.

She also writes several short stories, prose and poetry in various blogging platforms.
