= Coolie filming accident =

1982 on-set injury of Indian actor Amitabh Bachchan during filming of Coolie

- Date: 26 July 1982
- Time: Afternoon
- Location: Bangalore University campus, Bangalore, Karnataka, India
- Also known as: Coolie injury
- Cause: Mistimed stunt during fight-scene filming
- Participants: Amitabh Bachchan, Puneet Issar
- Outcome: Near-fatal abdominal injury; prolonged hospitalisation and recovery
- Injuries: Splenic rupture, intestinal perforation, internal haemorrhage

The Coolie filming accident was a near-fatal stunt-related injury sustained by Indian actor Amitabh Bachchan on 26 July 1982, during the filming of the Hindi-language film Coolie at the Bangalore University campus in Bangalore (now Bengaluru), Karnataka. While performing a fight scene with co-actor Puneet Issar, Bachchan mistimed a stunt, struck the corner of a table, and suffered a severe abdominal injury, including a splenic rupture and intestinal perforation. He was declared clinically dead for several minutes before being revived, and spent months recovering in hospital.

The incident triggered a wave of mass public concern across India, with millions of citizens participating in public prayers and demonstrations of solidarity. Daily hospital bulletins became front-page national news, and political leaders, including then-Prime Minister Indira Gandhi, visited the actor in hospital. The event has been extensively analysed in film studies and cultural studies scholarship as a defining case study in the sociology of stardom in India and the extraordinary hold of Hindi cinema on the Indian public imagination.

== Background ==
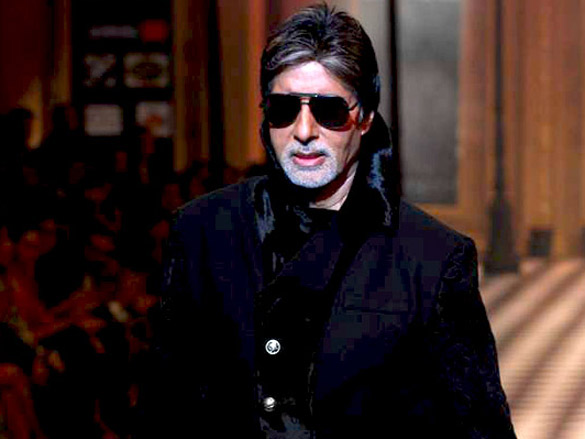
Bachchan was described as "one-man industry" for his dominance in Indian cinema and public imagination during the 1970-80s

By 1982, Amitabh Bachchan was the dominant star of Hindi cinema, having established the iconic "Angry Young Man" persona through films such as Zanjeer (1973), Deewaar (1975), and Sholay (1975). His on-screen image as an indestructible, justice-seeking hero had earned him an almost mythological status among Indian audiences, and his commercial dominance was such that multiple productions were simultaneously under way to capitalise on his stardom. Coolie, directed by Manmohan Desai and produced by Ketan Desai, was one such project: a commercial film in which Bachchan played a railway porter named Iqbal who battles a smuggling syndicate.

== The accident ==
On 26 July 1982, while filming a fight sequence on location at the Bangalore University campus, Bachchan was required to perform a choreographed stunt: he was to receive a simulated punch from Issar, fall backward onto a table, and execute a half-somersault to the ground. During the final take, the timing of the stunt went wrong and Bachchan struck the corner of the table with full force, rather than his body landing flat across its surface. The impact caused a splenic rupture and intestinal perforation, resulting in massive internal haemorrhage.

Although in severe pain, Bachchan reportedly attempted to continue the shot before collapsing. He was rushed to St Philomena's Hospital in Bangalore, where he underwent emergency surgery. As his condition remained critical, he was subsequently shifted to Breach Candy Hospital in Bombay (now Mumbai) for further treatment. On 2 August 1982, Bachchan was declared clinically dead for several minutes before the medical team revived him; he has since referred to 2 August as his "second birthday". He remained hospitalised for approximately two months, returning home on 24 September 1982.

== Public and political reaction ==
Millions of fans across India held prayer meetings with concern. Crowds gathered outside Breach Candy Hospital and hospital bulletins on his condition were carried as front-page news by national newspapers.

Prime Minister Indira Gandhi, who had a longstanding personal relationship with the Bachchan family, visited the actor at Breach Candy Hospital. Rajiv Gandhi, a close personal friend of Bachchan's, reportedly cut short an overseas trip to be at his bedside.

== Aftermath and legacy ==
=== Impact on the film ===
After his recovery, Bachchan returned to complete the remaining scenes of Coolie. The original screenplay, written by Kader Khan, called for Bachchan's character Iqbal to die in the film's climax after being shot by the antagonist. Director Manmohan Desai decided that having the character die on screen after the actor had narrowly survived in real life would be inappropriate. The ending was changed so that Iqbal survives. The film became the highest-grossing Indian film of 1983.

=== Impact on Puneet Issar ===
Despite Bachchan and his wife Jaya Bachchan publicly maintaining that the incident was a tragic accident and bearing no ill will towards Issar, the co-actor faced severe public backlash. Puneet Issar later stated in interviews that he lost several film projects in the aftermath and struggled to find work for years. Issar eventually rebuilt his career, achieving recognition for his portrayal of Duryodhana in the television series Mahabharat (1988–1990).

=== Long-term health consequences ===
During his treatment, Bachchan received blood transfusions from a large number of donors. Years later, it was discovered that one of the transfused units had been contaminated with the hepatitis B virus. The infection went undetected for over two decades, eventually causing significant liver damage; Bachchan was later diagnosed with cirrhosis affecting approximately 75 per cent of his liver, despite being a lifelong teetotaller. He has subsequently been a public advocate for hepatitis B vaccination and blood safety.

Bachchan revealed in an episode of Kaun Banega Crorepati in 2021 that he does not have a detectable pulse on his wrist because of repeated drawing of blood from there.

== See also ==
- Puneet Issar
- Manmohan Desai
- Stunt-related injuries in film
- List of film and television accidents
- Celebrity worship syndrome
