= Coolie (1983 Hindi film) =

1983 Indian film by Manmohan Desai

- Film poster
- Directed by: Manmohan Desai
- Written by: Kader Khan; Smt. Jeevanprabha M. Desai; K.K. Shukla
- Produced by: Ketan Desai
- Starring: Amitabh Bachchan; Rishi Kapoor; Rati Agnihotri; Waheeda Rehman; Shoma Anand; Kader Khan; Puneet Issar; Suresh Oberoi; Satyen Kappu; Nilu Phule
- Cinematography: Peter Pereira
- Edited by: Hrishikesh Mukherjee
- Music by: Laxmikant–Pyarelal
- Distributed by: Aasia Films Pvt. Ltd. M.K.D. Films Combine
- Release date: 2 December 1983
- Running time: 168 minutes
- Country: India
- Language: Hindi
- Budget: ₹3.5 crore (35 million)
- Box office: ₹21 crore (210 million)

Coolie is a 1983 Indian Hindi-language action comedy film, directed by Manmohan Desai and written by Kader Khan. The film stars Amitabh Bachchan as Iqbal Aslam Khan, a railway coolie, who was separated from his mother Salma (Waheeda Rehman) due to Zafar's (Kader Khan) obsession with her. This obsession causes the destruction of her family and her mental breakdown. Years later, fate unites her sons, Iqbal and Sunny (Rishi Kapoor) and they set out to save Salma from Zafar's captivity. It also starred Rati Agnihotri, Shoma Anand, Suresh Oberoi and Puneet Issar.

The film was released on 2 December 1983 and became the highest-grossing film of the year. It did ₹21 crore (US$20.71 million) in gross revenue. It made over ₹1 crore (US$986,397.58) per territory, a rare achievement for the time and was a huge blockbuster.

The film is infamous for a fight scene with Issar, during which Bachchan had a near-fatal injury due to a miscalculated jump. In the final cut of the film, the fight scene during which he was injured was frozen and a message appears marking the scene as the one in which he was injured. The original script showed Bachchan dying after Kader Khan shot him. But later on, after the injury-and-recovery episode, Desai thought that this would have a negative impact on the movie as well as a bad feeling in the audience, decided to change the ending. The modified ending has the hero recover after his operation.

According to film expert Rajesh Subramanian Manmohan Desai a great admirer of Hrishikesh Mukerjee requested the veteran director cum editor to edit Coolie.

== Plot ==
In 1953, Zafar Khan, a wealthy yet evil man, fell in love with a girl named Salma and wanted to marry her, but she and her father refused. Zafar was arrested for various crimes and imprisoned for 10 years, but when he is released after his term, he saw that Salma was married to a good man named Aslam Khan. Enraged, Zafar murders Salma's father and plots his revenge by flooding the region in which Salma lives, nearly killing Aslam and injuring Salma, causing her to lose her memory. During this catastrophe, Salma is also separated from her young son Iqbal. On a railway platform, Iqbal attempts to run after her on foot while Salma is on a train but he slips and the train leaves the platform. Zafar abducts Salma and tells the world she is his wife. He also adopts an infant from an orphanage in Kanpur, a boy named Sunny, for Salma to raise on the advice of a psychiatrist. Meanwhile, Iqbal is reunited with his uncle, who has lost his wife and son in the flood. In the process of a heated fight, Iqbal's uncle has lost his right arm, to which Iqbal tells him he will serve as his uncle's right arm from the present onward. The uncle will raise Iqbal as his own, as they have no more family.

20 years later, Iqbal and his uncle work as coolies. Iqbal has grown up to be a dashing, confident young man, and is considered the leader of the local coolies. During an incident with a man named Mr. Puri, a coolie is beaten up badly, to which Iqbal is infuriated. Mr. Puri is beaten up, but Iqbal is wrongfully imprisoned for his actions. On the same day, however, he is set free. He organizes a labor strike, which brings the station to its knees. Sunny, a young, budding reporter, is covering the story. While speaking to Sunny, Iqbal sees a picture of Sunny's mother who turns out to be Salma. In another attempt to get Salma back, Iqbal rushes to her house to bring her back after all these years, but, to his horror, Salma does not recognize him. Zafar is infuriated at Iqbal's trespass. His crooks, disguised as police officers, near-fatally beat Iqbal, while he takes Salma to the psychiatrist to administer electric shocks on her so that her memory never returns. Sunny threatens to publish all of Zafar's crimes in the newspapers the following day if he does not return Salma to him.

Iqbal and Sunny become friends, and both find love; Iqbal with a Christian girl Julie D'Costa and Sunny with his childhood sweetheart, Deepa. Meanwhile, Aslam has been imprisoned for a crime he did not commit. When he is finally let out, Julie tries to kill him in a graveyard because she thought he had murdered her father, John D'Costa, but, as the revolver is empty, she cannot fire. Aslam explains that Zafar had murdered her father, and framed Aslam, to which Julie believes him. Things are looking up, but the coolies uncover a banking and housing scandal against them. After a series of run-ins with the corrupt parties, Iqbal finds himself in a fight to the death with Zafar. Salma returns at a very pivotal scene in the film, during the election standoff between the communist workers under Iqbal and the capitalist lords under Zafar with her old memories intact and she publicly testifies against Zafar and how he destroyed her family. In the crowd is an old man, who turns out to be Iqbal's long-lost father Aslam, while Iqbal's uncle recognizes a birthmark on Sunny, proving that Sunny was indeed the son he thought he had lost in the great flood.

The family is reunited, much to the fury of Zafar, who then proceeds to shoot Aslam but accidentally kills Iqbal's uncle. Zafar then abducts Salma. Iqbal and Sunny both chase after the evildoers, killing Mr. Puri (who dies from a heart attack due to the mental pressure of the chase) and Vicky (who falls out of Zafar's car and is run over by an oncoming truck) in the process, until Iqbal corners Zafar at Haji Ali Dargah. The holy shroud from the dargah flies onto Iqbal's chest, and Iqbal defiantly faces Zafar with the belief in God's protection from harm with His name on his chest. He is shot several times by Zafar, but he continues to chase Zafar up the minaret, saying a part of the azaan with each shot. With the last of his strength, he cries the takbir and pushes Zafar off the parapet, killing him instantly, and Iqbal collapses into his mother's arms. Coolies from all faiths pray hard for his recovery, and Iqbal recovers from his injuries to the joy of all.

== Cast ==
- Amitabh Bachchan as Iqbal Khan
- Rishi Kapoor as Sunny Khan
- Rati Agnihotri as Julie D' Costa
- Waheeda Rehman as Salma Khan (Iqbal's mother)
- Shoma Anand as Deepa Iyengar
- Amrish Puri as John D' Costa (Julie's father)
- Kader Khan as Zafar Khan
- Suresh Oberoi as Vicky Puri
- Puneet Issar as Bob
- Satyen Kappu as Aslam Khan (Iqbal's Father)
- Om Shivpuri as Om Puri
- Nilu Phule as Nathu
- Mukri as Deepa's Father
- Tun Tun as Mother of 7 babies
- Goga Kapoor as Goga
- Ballu (pet eagle) as AllahRakha (name means God's protection)

== Production ==
Coolie continued Bachchan's role as the "Angry Young Man," though it "was more layered, showcasing vulnerability, empathy, and resilience in the face of adversity."

Kader Khan, who also stars as the film's antagonist, wrote the screenplay. In addition to having Bachchan play a Muslim protagonist, Khan incorporated elements of Islamic Sufi mysticism into the script, including various Sufi motifs and references.

=== Accident during filming ===
The film gained notoriety even before its release when Amitabh Bachchan was critically injured on 26 July 1982 in the intestines while filming a fight scene with co-star Puneet Issar at the Bangalore University campus, which almost cost him his life.

In the fight scene, Bachchan was supposed to fall onto a table but mistimed his jump. This resulted in an internal abdominal injury. He was transferred to a Mumbai hospital, where according to the actor, he went into a "haze and coma-like situation", and was "clinically dead for a couple of minutes".

While he was in the hospital, there were reports of widespread mourning, and prayers were offered by many Indians in the country and abroad. According to reports, Rajiv Gandhi cancelled a trip to the United States to be with him.

Bachchan received 60 bottles of blood from 200 donors, one of whom was carrying the Hepatitis B virus. Bachchan recovered from the accident but discovered in 2,000 that the virus had resulted in cirrhosis of the liver, which damaged about 75% of his liver. Bachchan later spoke out about his experience to raise awareness about the Hepatitis B vaccine.

Despite the critical injury, Bachchan recovered remarkably and resumed shooting on 7 January 1983. In the final cut of the film, the fight scene during which he was injured was frozen and a message appears marking the scene as the one in which he was injured. Manmohan Desai did this on Amitabh's wish.

Due to Bachchan's injury, the ending was also changed. The original script showed Amitabh dying after Kader Khan shot him. But later on, after the injury-and-recovery episode, Manmohan Desai, thinking that this would have a negative impact on the movie as well as a bad feeling in the audience, decided to change the ending. The modified ending has the hero recover after his operation.

== Soundtrack ==
Shabbir Kumar, whose voice was similar to Mohammed Rafi, Manmohan Desai’s preferred singer, was used to provide playback to Amitabh Bachchan.

All lyrics are written by Anand Bakshi; all music is composed by Laxmikant-Pyarelal.

No.	Title	Singer(s)	Length
1.	"Mujhe Peene Ka Shauk Nahin"	Shabbir Kumar, Alka Yagnik	06:21
2.	"Jawani Ke Rail Kahin"	Shabbir Kumar, Anuradha Paudwal	04:33
3.	"Lambuji Tinguji"	Shabbir Kumar, Shailendra Singh	06:03
4.	"Sari Duniya Ka Bojh Hum Uthate Hai"	Shabbir Kumar	05:55
5.	"Hum ka Ishq Hua"	Shabbir Kumar, Asha Bhosle, Suresh Wadkar	05:30
6.	"Accident Ho Gaya"	Shabbir Kumar, Asha Bhosle	06:13
7.	"Mubarak Ho Tumko Haj Ka Mahina"	Shabbir Kumar	06:37
8.	"Ye Gaye Woh Gaye"	Shabbir Kumar	3.05
Total length:			41:11

== Box office ==
It was the highest grossing Bollywood film of 1983, with ₹180 million (US$17.76 million) in gross revenue. It was declared "super-hit" by Boxoffice India in 2009. The film made over ₹10 million (US$986,397.58) per territory, a rare achievement for the time and was a huge blockbuster. In 1984, it was estimated that the film had sold 70 million tickets.

== See also ==
- Amar Akbar Anthony
- Muqaddar Ka Sikander
- Muslim social
- List of film and television accidents
