= Puneet Issar =

Indian actor (born 1959)

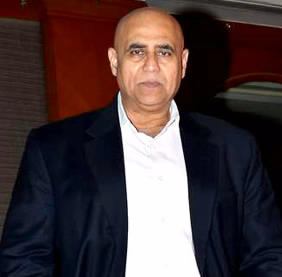
- Issar in 2014
- Born: 6 November 1959 (age 67)
- Occupations: Actor; writer; producer; director; dialect coach
- Years active: 1983–present
- Known for: Coolie; Mahabharat; Border; Garv; The Kashmir Files
- Spouse: Deepali Issar
- Children: 2
- Father: Sudesh Issar
- Relatives: Satyajeet Puri (brother-in-law)

Puneet Issar (born 6 November 1959) is an Indian actor, writer, director, producer, and dialect coach best known for his works in Hindi films and television shows. Issar started his acting career as a villain in Manmohan Desai's 1983 film Coolie, but gained recognition with the portrayal of Duryodhana in B. R. Chopra's television series Mahabharat (1988–1990).

Following Mahabharat, Issar acted in notable films including Chandra Mukhi (1993), Prem Shakti (1994), Ram Jaane (1995), Border (1997), Refugee (2000), Krrish (2006), Bachna Ae Haseeno (2008), Ready (2011), Son of Sardaar (2012) and The Kashmir Files (2022). His first directorial work was Salman Khan starrer cop film Garv (2004), for which he co-wrote the screenplay with his wife, Deepali.

Besides Mahabharat, Issar also went on to be part of television shows like Param Vir Chakra (1987), Bharat Ek Khoj (1988), Junoon (1993-1998), Noorjahan (1999-2000), Mahabharat (2013), Parchhayee: Ghost Stories by Ruskin Bond (2019) and Choti Sarrdaarni (2021). He was a contestant in the reality television show Bigg Boss 8 (2014–2015), hosted by Salman Khan. Formerly, he worked as a dialect coach at various acting institutions, and his expertise included speech, diction and physical gestures.

== Personal life ==
Puneet is the son of film director Sudesh Issar. He is also a trained artist and an 8th degree black belt holder.

He belongs to a Punjabi Hindu family which migrated from Pakistan following the 1947 partition.

He is married to Deepali, the daughter of actor Daljeet Puri and sister of actor Satyajeet Puri. She has written the films Garv: Pride and Honour (2004) and I Am Singh (2011) both directed by Puneet. The couple has two children, daughter Nivriti Issar and son Siddhant Issar. Siddhant is also an actor.

Issar is a fitness and gym enthusiast. He also made some positive headlines for fitness at the age of 60.

== Career ==
Puneet Issar during a play at Jaipur Theatre Festival, 2029

Issar has starred as a villain in over 150 films, such as Zakhmi Aurat, Kal Ki Aawaz, Palay Khan, Teja, Prem Shakti and opposite stars like Mohanlal, Salman Khan and Akshay Kumar. He also played a villain in the Shah Rukh Khan starrer Ram Jaane. He appeared in the hit war film Border. He played the role of Parashurama in 2013 Mahabharata and Duryodhana in the epic TV series Mahabharat (1988–1990), which brought him mainstream popularity.

He played the Indian Superman, a Bollywood version of the Hollywood films. He played the second lead in the cult Indian horror film Purana Mandir in 1983. Later he did many other horror movies such as Tehkhana in the 1980s.

He also starred in movies such as Krrish, Partner, Aryan, Bachna Ae Haseeno and many more in the 2000s.

In 1982, he was involved in an on-shoot incident with Amitabh Bachchan during the shoot of Coolie. He accidentally injured Amitabh, nearly fatally, and suffered the industry's backlash due to it. He later admitted that he had to face a lot of problems in getting roles in movies, and he also lost 7-8 films due to the notoriety of the incident. He also went out of work for 6 years.

He has also directed TV serials such as Hindustani and Jai Mata Ki starring Hema Malini. He has starred in over 12 TV serials such as Junoon, Sahil, Noor Jahan, Vikram Aur Betaal and many more. He has appeared in over 1800 episodes on Indian television. He played the role of King Bimbisara in the feature film Gautama Buddha – The Life and Times of Gautama Buddha. He also starred in Left Right Left of the Indian Channel Sab TV. He has also worked in several Punjabi films, such as Rab Ne Banayian Jodiyan and in a few Telugu films. He has also given a brilliant display of his acting skills in the mythological film Suryaputra Shanidev, which was released in 1997.

In 2004, Issar directed the film Garv: Pride and Honour starring Salman Khan and Shilpa Shetty in lead roles. The opening collections of the film were good, and overall it was declared "Above Average" at the box office. His latest directorial venture, I Am Singh, the story of which is also written by him, released in December 2011. It is based on the stories about the Sikh immigrants in the USA after the 11 September attacks.

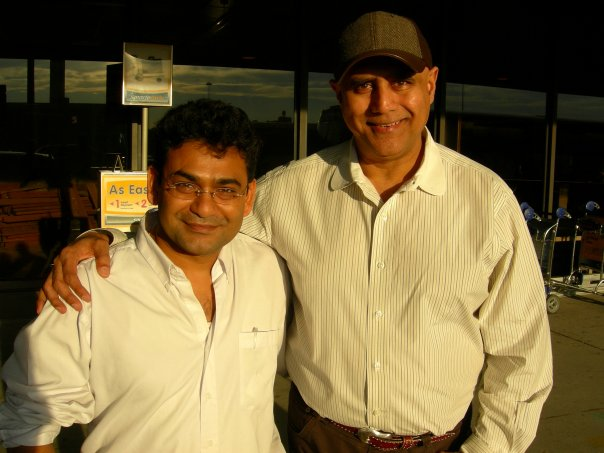
Issar in 2010 on the sets of his film I Am Singh

In the Indian TV reality show Bigg Boss season 8, in 2014/2015, Issar was one of the 7 finalists. He was evicted from the show on 3 January 2015. Issar lasted in the house for 105 days. At 56, he was the oldest contestant to do so and lasted the entire season in the house. He played the role of "Daar ji" in Choti Sarrdaarni.

In 2022, Issar played DGP Hari Narain in The Kashmir Files, a film based on the Exodus of Kashmiri Pandits.

== Filmography ==
Key
†	Denotes films that have not yet been released

=== Films ===
==== Hindi ====
Year	Title	Role	Notes
1983	Coolie	Bob	
1984	Raja Aur Rana		
1984	Purana Mandir	Anand	
1985	3D Saamri	Police Inspector Baldev	
1986	Janbaaz		
1986	Palay Khan	Amar Singh	
1986	Dahleez		
1986	Tahkhana	Anand	
1987	Pyar Ki Jeet	Darshan Patel	
1987	Hathyar		
1987	Superman	Shekhar/Superman	
1987	Bhai Ka Dushman Bhai		
1987	Watan Ke Rakhwale	Akbar	
1987	Awam	Paras	
1988	Akhri Muqabla		
1988	Zakhmi Aurat	Sukhdev	
1988	Zalzala		
1988	Main Tere Liye		
1988	Kasam		
1988	Maar Dhaad	Police Inspector Sangraam /Jaggu	
1989	Elaan-E-Jung		
1990	Haar Jeet		
1990	Maa Kasam Badla Loonga	Inspector Kishan Singh	
1990	Roti Ki Keemat	D'Souza	
1990	Tejaa		
1990	Jaan Lada Denge		
1991	Sanam Bewafa	Afzal Khan	
1991	Meet Mere Man Ke		
1991	Paap Ki Aandhi		
1992	Kal Ki Awaz		
1992	Jaagruti		
1992	Suryavanshi	Mahesh	
1993	Shri Krishna Bhakta Narsi		
1993	Chandra Mukhi	Zoohla	
1993	Ashaant	Raana	
1993	Anmol		
1993	Khal-Naaikaa	Dr. Rajan Bakshi	
1993	Kshatriya	Shakti Singh	
1993	Zakhmi Rooh		
1994	Prem Shakti		
1994	Yaar Gaddar		
1994	Kranti Kshetra	Shaitaan Singh	
1994	Cheetah		
1995	Ram Jaane	Inspector Chewte	
1995	Haathkadi	Chakku Pandey	
1995	Jallad	Bola	
1996	Muqadar	Parashuram	
1997	Border	Subedar Ratan Singh, VrC	
1997	Suraj	Mangal Singh	
1997	Daadagiri	Dhanraj	
1997	Jodidar	Poacher	
1997	Suryaputra Shani-dev	Shani dev	
1997	Krantikari		
1998	Sher-E-Hindustan	Police inspector Khulbhushan	
1998	Chandaal	Police inspector Khurana	
1999	Jaalsaaz	Pratap Singh	
2000	Refugee		
2001	Zakhmi Sipahi	Chhota Chaudhary	
2001	Bhairav	Jindal	
2004	Vajra-The Weapon		
2005	Bunty Aur Babli		
2005	Kasak		
2006	Aryan	Ranveer Singh Bagga	
2006	Krrish	Komal Singh	
2006	Humko Deewana Kar Gaye		
2007	Partner	Rana from Haryana	
2008	Gautama Buddha	Anguli Mala	Also shot in Telugu
2008	Bachna Ae Haseeno		
2008	God Tussi Great Ho		
2008	The Wheel of Action Highway		
2011	Yamla Pagla Deewana	Tejpaal Singh	
2011	Ready	Ishwar Chaudhary	
2011	I Am Singh	Fateh Singh	
2011	Chhutanki		
2012	Qayamat Hi Qayamat		
2012	Son of Sardaar	Sardar	
2013	Mahabharat Aur Barbareek	Duryodhana	
2022	The Kashmir Files	DGP Hari Narayan	
2022	Jayeshbhai Jordaar	Amar Tau	
2025	The Bengal Files	Rajesh Singh	
2026	Border 2	Subedar Ratan Singh, VrC	Cameo

==== Telugu ====
Year	Title	Role	Notes
1997	Master	Devaraju aka DR, a mafia don	
2002	Indra	Shoukat Ali Khan	
2003	Tagore	Police Commissioner Balbir Singh	
2004	Guri	Minister	
2005	Allari Pidugu	Major Chakravarthy	
2005	Narasimhudu	JD	
2007	Chandrahas	Liaqat Ali Khan	
2008	Gautama Buddha	Anguli Mala	
2016	Eedu Gold Ehe	Mahadev	
2018	Sarabha	Chandraksha	
2019	iSmart Shankar	Kasi Viswanath	
2019	Captain Rana Pratap		

==== Punjabi ====
Year	Title	Role	Notes
2006	Rab Ne Banaiyan Jodiean		
2009	Jag Jeondeyan De Mele		
2012	Best of Luck	Jarnail Singh	
2014	Fateh	Pratap Singh	
2020	Teri Meri Gal Ban Gayi		

==== Kannada ====
Year	Title	Role	Notes
1994	Samrat		
1994	Chinna		
1994	Rasika		
1994	Time Bomb	Jinga	

==== Bengali ====
Year	Title	Role	Notes
1995	Bhagya Debata		
2008	Satyamev Jayate		
2010	Josh		
2015	Besh Korechi Prem Korechi		

==== Tamil ====
Year	Title	Role	Notes
1993	Uzhaippali	Duriyodhanan	
1993	I Love India		
1994	Athiradi Padai		

==== Malayalam ====
Year	Title	Role	Notes
1992	Yoddha	Vishakha (black magician)	
1994	Pingami	Edwin Thomas	

==== Marathi ====
Year	Title	Role	Notes
2012	Jai Maharashtra Dhaba Bhatinda	Jas's Father	
2026	Ranapati Shivray: Swari Agra	Mirza Raje Jai Singh	

=== Television ===
Year(s)	Title	Role	Notes
1985	Vikram Aur Betaal	Episodic roles	
1987	Param Vir Chakra	Naik Jadu Nath Singh	
1988–1990	Mahabharat	Duryodhan	
1993–1998	Junoon	Saudagar Singh	
1988	Bharat Ek Khoj	Maharana Pratap	
1997–1997	Betaal Pachisi	Kabira	
1997–1998	Mahabharat Katha	Duryodhan	
1999–2000	Jai Mata Ki	Mahishasur	
1999–2000	Noorjahan	Sher-e-Afghan	
2006–2007	Left Right Left	Brigadier Chandok	
2007	Love Story		
2008	Neeli Aankhen		
2011	Dwarkadheesh Bhagwaan Shree Krishn	Jarasandh	
2011	Kahaani Chandrakanta Ki	King Shivdutt	
2013	Bani Ishq Da Kalma	Gurudev Singh Bhullar	
2013	Mahabharat	Parshurama	
2013	Sri Bhagavatam	Ravana and Hiranyakashyap	Telugu Mythological serial on ETV
2014–2015	Bigg Boss 8	Contestant	6th place
2018	Namune	Dhanaji	
2019	Parchhayee: Ghost Stories by Ruskin Bond	Maharaja Digambar Singh	
2021	Choti Sarrdaarni	Beant Singh Gill	
2022	Channa Mereya	Rajwant Singh	
2023–2024	Vanshaj	Bhanupratap Mahajan "Dada Babu"	
2025	Shiv Shakti – Tap Tyaag Tandav	Ravana	

=== Other credits ===
Year	Title	Director	Writer	Producer	Notes
1997–1998	Hindustani	Yes	No	No	
1999–2000	Jai Mata Ki	Yes	No	No	
2004	Garv: Pride & Honour	Yes	Yes	No	
2011	I Am Singh	Yes	Yes	Yes	

== Theatre ==
In 2018, Puneet Issar wrote and directed the stage production Mahabharat: The Epic Tale, produced by Rahul Bhuchar under Felicity Theatre. The play featured Puneet Issar as Duryodhan and Rahul Bhuchar as Karna, exploring the friendship between the two characters.
