= Bangalore University Task Force =

High-power committee

Bangalore University Task Force on teacher education (simply known as BU Task Force) is a high-power committee founded in May 2012 to inspect the quality and functioning of teacher education colleges under Bangalore University. The Task Force, chaired by the university's Academic Council Member H. Karan Kumar, submitted an interim report on the quality and functioning of seven M.Ed. colleges during August 2012, which was unanimously accepted by the Academic Council in its meeting held on 29 August 2012.

The Task Force recommended that the admission of students to all the seven M.Ed. colleges be suspended for the academic year 2012 - 2013. Also, a 205-page interim report on the quality & functioning of ninety-nine Bachelor in Education (B.Ed.) colleges was submitted by the Task Force during November 2012, which was unanimously approved by both the Academic Council and the Syndicate during their meetings held on 30 November 2012, and 12 & 17 December 2012 respectively. The report recommended disaffiliation of fifty-five B.Ed. colleges for gross irregularities in academic, administrative functioning and non-compliance with National Council for Teacher Education (NCTE) norms. The Task Force was functional until 30 June 2013.

== Status of Teacher Education that led to the Constitution of Task Force ==
Prior to the formation of Task Force, Mr. Karan Kumar H., the Academic Council Member of Bangalore University, submitted a report on the status of teacher education under Bangalore University to the Vice Chancellor during February 2012, based on a survey conducted between December 2011 and February 2012. Apart from infrastructure flaws, the survey recorded gross non-adherence to rules concerning the way academic programmes and admissions were conducted. Also, 80 per cent of the colleges were not conducting academic programs according to procedures. After interactions with Local Inquiry Committees (LICs), it was found that neither the students nor the staff were present during the LIC's visit.

In the survey period, Karan collated information from seven experts, including Dr Sameer K Simha (retired lecturer), Dr R Nagarajaiah and Dr Gururaj Karajagi (Chairperson of Academy of Creative Teaching).

== Constitution ==
Former Vice-Chancellor Dr N Prabhu Dev ordered the constitution of the task force in May, following pressure from various academic quarters to fix the allegations of gross irregularities, malpractices and falling educational standards in teacher education colleges under the university. "The Task Force is authorised to undertake surprise inspection of the colleges to obtain first-hand information regarding the conduct of BEd and MEd courses. It may inspect admissions, attendance, appointments of teachers, internal assessment marks and other aspects," the Vice-Chancellor's order stated.

The academic council that met thrice in July 2012 deliberated, in detail, on LIC (Local Inquiry Committee) Reports of Academic Year 2012–13, including reports of B.Ed. Colleges. With due consent of each and every Chairperson of the LICs, the Academic Council unanimously resolved to set aside all LIC Reports of B.Ed. Colleges for deficiencies and lack of information to grant affiliation for the academic year 2012–13 (the LIC is an internal university committee that is constituted to inspect the academic viability of colleges before granting fresh/renewal of affiliations). The Academic Council also resolved unanimously to additionally request the BU Task Force to take up the responsibility of submitting its recommendations on grant of affiliation or disaffiliation to the university. For the same, it gave the Task Force 3 months time with a direction to submit its interim report on renewal of affiliation / disaffiliation of B.Ed. Colleges for the academic year 2012–13.

This was followed by Karan Kumar and his team paying surprise visits to various B.Ed. and Master of Education (M.Ed.) colleges. During the course of its surprise visits, the Task Force interacted with Principals, Faculty and students of most of the colleges and video recorded the proceedings to show the abject lack of standards in the colleges that were inspected. Several instances of colleges indulging in malpractices were also exposed before the media.

== Interim Reports ==
The Task Force has submitted two reports so far. In August 2012, the first report was based on seven M.Ed. colleges under Bangalore University. The report was upheld in the academic council meeting, where it was decided to cancel management quota admissions in these colleges. NCTE issued show-cause notices to the colleges in September 2012.

The second report is the interim report on 99 B.Ed. colleges. The report, which has categorised colleges based on the level of compliance with National Council for Teacher Education (NCTE) norms, has listed 23 colleges under the category of ‘colleges with gross irregularities’. Only 12 colleges are found to have satisfactory level of compliance with NCTE rules. Another 20 colleges have been recommended disaffiliation for not having NCTE recognition. The Task Force has also recommended the NCTE that it may initiate the process of withdrawal of recognition of these 55 colleges. As many as 18 colleges, on the peril in terms of compliance, have been given six months time to improve. Admissions for the year 2012-13 have been suspended in these 18 colleges.

== M.Ed. Interim Report ==
=== Pramble ===
The Academic Council unanimously resolved to accept and approve this report and it was decided to cancel the admission of students under management quota in these colleges. Six months was also given to these colleges to comply with the shortcomings as stated in the report.

The High Court asked the Academic Council to take a call on the resolution passed in the council in the absence of a quorum. The order was made concerning the Academic Council meeting on 11 July where it was resolved to place all the local inquiry committee (LIC) reports dealing with BEd colleges under the purview of the task force. This meeting was attended by 32 members, short of three members for the quorum.

In his defense, Task Force Chairman H Karan Kumar said that both Academic Council and Syndicate, in their meetings in March 2006, had resolved to set the quorum for Academic Council meetings as 21 members instead of 35 members according to the existing statutes. "The meeting in question was attended by 32 of the 42 total number members. All 32 have unanimously passed a resolution," he said adding that the High Court has to be apprised of these facts.

== Report on Practical Examination of AY 2011-12 held from 3 September to 5 October 2012 ==
To verify the work related to practice teaching and the conduct of practical examination, three (3) B.Ed. special squads were constituted by the Registrar (Evaluation) on 28 August 2012. As per the guidance of the Task Force, these special squads visited various B.Ed. colleges & schools attached to them for conducting practical examination between 3 September & 22 September 2012. The Task Force had two meetings with all the three squads on 15 September 2012 & 22 September 2012 and in those meetings, the squad members reported to the Task Force, several irregularities, which they found during the inspection of colleges/schools of practical examination.

As a result, the Task Force decided to video record the ongoing B.Ed. practical examination & asked all three squads to have the video recording of irregularities. All three squads have video recorded many of the irregularities found in conducting practical examination (the video clippings are available with the Task Force). The squads also submitted an interim report/s to the Chairman of the Task Force. The Task Force also video recorded the opinion of the squad members. During the practical examination, on its own, the Task Force also visited a few B.Ed. colleges and recorded irregularities of B.Ed. practical examination. Based on the video evidence of the irregularities found by three special squads, the Task Force has listed 53 colleges with ‘gross irregularities’.

Below are the irregularities that were reported by the squads of Bangalore University:

- 1. By and large, students from outside Karnataka State have not attended the required academic program to be eligible for B.Ed. practical examination. In fact, none of them were aware of the academic program/requirements of B.Ed. education.
- 2. Practical examinations were conducted without collecting examination fees from students. Even, the examination/hall tickets were not issued to the students.
- 3. A lot of irregularities were found in the submission of a lesson plan by students, as nearly 75% of the students have not followed the norms of practical examination.
- 4. Practical Examinations, involving students from the States like Orissa, Jharkhand, West Bengal & Bihar, have gross irregularities.
- 5. Students from outside Karnataka State are attending only the practical examinations (without undergoing practice teaching & criticism lesson planning of nearly 2 months) and are heading back to their respective states, immediately after the practical examinations. Earlier, they were in Bengaluru to just attend their first semester exams during May 2012 and are coming again only to attend the second-semester theory exams during November 2012.
- 6. The majority of outside Karnataka students had no communication skills to explain their lessons & none of them could speak English (although the medium of instruction is English in all B.Ed. colleges).
- 7. There were cases of some B.Ed. Colleges engaging teachers, that too from other irregular colleges, as internal examiners to conduct practical examinations.
- 8. Without having external examiners, practical examinations were conducted at various schools (identified for practical examinations by B.Ed. colleges & approved by BU)
- 9. Very shockingly, many repeaters (of the previous years) have attended the practical examination without even paying their fee to the university and/or having the approval of the university.
- 10. In all, academic records like ‘Lessons Observation Record’ of students, Teacher's Observation Diary, Lesson Plans written by the students for Methods of Teaching, Copy of the Rough Lesson Plans written by the students, Practice Teaching Time-table maintained by the college, List of Practice Teaching Schools & their address, Student Seminar Files, Criticism Lesson Plan Records, Unit Test Records, etc. were neither found nor maintained by most of the B.Ed. colleges and their students.
- 11. Ultimately, outstation students are asked to come, time & again, only for theory or practical examination for a week or so every semester, and thereby, the so-called off-campus program is continued without any hesitation from many of the management of B.Ed. colleges.

Now, keeping all the above observations, the BU Task Force recommends the following “Further Needful Action (FNA):

- 1. Those who were absent for practical examination (as per the reports of the special squads) shall be given a chance to take-up their practical examination only during the coming academic year (AY 2012-13). Their results may be declared as ‘Failed’ for the AY 2011–12.
- 2. Wherever gross irregularities are noted (in all the above listed 53 B.Ed. colleges), practical examinations shall be re-conducted, in such colleges, by appointing a panel of examiners drawn from other colleges. If needed, the authorities shall consult the Task Force in appointing a “Panel of Examiners”.
- 3. The chairperson, BOE (B.Ed.) has approved the time-table of practical examination & panel of examiners on the day of the examination itself, which is a major irregularity & the Chairperson of BOE shall be asked to explain on such approvals.
- 4. As the time given by Bangalore University for getting approval of the chairperson, BOE was 8 September 2012, all approvals of practical examinations beyond this date shall stand canceled & re-conduct of the practical examination shall be ordered.

BU would wait until the task force submitted its final report in October before taking a final call A day after the B.Ed. Task Force exposed how nine blacklisted colleges were allowed to conduct practical examinations, from 3 to 22 September, despite not receiving clearance on the status of affiliations, Bangalore University (BU) officials said they are not ruling out disaffiliation as a disciplinary measure.

To a question on what action the varsity would take, Vice-Chancellor N. Prabhu Deva said: “The only thing we can do is recommend disaffiliation. They were permitted only to hold theory exams. They were asked not to announce the results even for those.” However, he added that BU would wait until the task force submitted its final report in October before taking a final call.

Meanwhile, Registrar (Evaluation) R.K. Somashekhar said these colleges would not be allowed to hold any further examinations, at least not before the task force report was placed before the Syndicate. “Until that happens, there is no question of allowing these colleges to conduct any exams,” he said. He also denied having permitted the colleges to conduct practical exams and said: “On September 10, when permission was given, I was in the U.S. It was the in-charge Registrar who signed the order. My name has been dragged in unnecessarily.”

The Deccan Herald on 26 September had reported that the university officials had allowed the correction and announcement of the results of one of the blacklisted colleges. "Exams were held, but by mistake", says B’lore varsity. "Answer scripts of a blacklisted BEd college were evaluated and results were declared, by ‘mistake’." said the Registrar (Evaluation), who has held the Chairperson of Board of Examination (BoE) responsible. However, the marks cards have not been issued, he added.

With regard to the other reports that appeared in the newspaper on permitting holding practical examinations in the barred colleges, the Registrar (Evaluation) said it was allowed "in the light of an interim order of the High Court of Karnataka," pending the Court's decisions. The Registrar, however, failed to elaborate on the interim order. The university lawyer told Deccan Herald that she is unaware of it. Reacting to the news report that the Registrar (Evaluation) had allowed nine of the 11 barred colleges to conduct practical exams in September, Somashekar denied it stating that he was in the US during the period. "My signatures stated to be on the documents may have been forged," he said. He had also said that the Officer on Special Duty was obligated to sign on the permission letters, in his absence, as the Registrar (Administration) had initiated the permission letters. He added that he was not aware of the exams until the media reported about it.

Ego clashes, corruption, and lack of stringent affiliation norms have taken the sheen off BU. Allowing barred colleges to hold exams is the latest in the saga.

== Controversy ==
Representatives of BEd colleges threatening BU Task Force chairman Karan Kumar after the Academic Council meeting in Bangalore on 18 July.

The B.Ed. colleges under the Task Force scanner staged protests against Karan Kumar and the Task Force. The colleges alleged that the Task Force functioned in a manner that was not prescribed in its terms and conditions. General Secretary, Karnataka State Private B.Ed. College Principals and Lecturers Association, said: "The association rejects the report of the Task Force as it is unscientific and undemocratic. Recommending disaffiliation is one thing, but the manner in which the Task Force has carried out its study is not right. How can they trespass colleges, seize documents and approach outside regulatory bodies against the colleges?"

After the 18 July academic council meeting, representatives of various B.Ed. colleges stormed into the meeting hall and publicly threatened Karan Kumar with dire consequences.

The agitating B.Ed. colleges even boycotted valuation of B.Ed. answer scripts, a stir that was eventually withdrawn after acting Vice-Chancellor N Rangaswamy managed to convince them to resume valuation work.

Based on complaints received by students and teachers about malpractices in the second semester BEd examinations that started on 6 November 2012, the Task Force on Teacher Education did visit few theory examination centers for inspection. It identified eight examination centres for malpractices. During its visit to examination centers for inspection, Bangalore University's examination squad for the ongoing BEd theory exams has reportedly refused to cooperate with the Task Force members. Also, the squad members allegedly threatened the Task Force members of dire consequences and warned them against continuing the inspection. The Task Force has been regularly reporting to the university about the "fraudulent" BEd colleges.

Karan Kumar told Deccan Herald that many of the exam squad members were from the blacklisted BEd colleges. He said he suspected foul play from the university's end in selection of members for the squad. The university has allegedly been conducting exams for students of colleges that have been derecognised by the National Council for Teachers’ Education. Students appearing for the examinations in several centres have reportedly alerted the Task Force about the rampant malpractice, including mass copying, he said.

A BJP MLC and senior ABVP leader asked the government to scrap the Bangalore University B.Ed. Task Force, alleging that it has been targeting and harassing a few colleges. The MLC, Prof. P.V. Krishna Bhat, wrote a letter to Legislative Council chairman D.H. Shankaramurthy, stating that he wanted to raise the issue during the monsoon session. "Principals of many B.Ed. colleges have told me that this task force, headed by Mr. Karan Kumar, is conducting surprise raids on private B.Ed. colleges in the city and is harassing college managements in the name of inspection. The government should interfere immediately and must put an end to this task force," he states in the letter. Prof. Bhat said it is the responsibility of the Local Inquiry Committee to report any loopholes in colleges, and it is the prerogative of the BU Syndicate to act against such colleges, based on the LIC report. Mr. Bhat has alleged that the task force has no legal sanctity and is harassing the B.Ed. colleges.

Prof. Bhat's letter comes as a surprise to many academics, who were pressuring BU to implement the B.Ed. task force report which has shed light on the corrupt practices of these colleges. "There may be some technical issues with the B.Ed Task Force, but it is doing a wonderful job. It has done what the Syndicate and LIC could not do for years. It is the ABVP which is in the forefront of all agitations aimed at bringing qualitative changes in the higher education sector. But no one knows why a senior ABVP leader like Prof. Bhat is opposing it," said a senior faculty member of the university.

== Events that followed the submission of Interim Reports ==
During its meeting on 30 November 2012, the Academic Council unanimously accepted the Interim Report of the Task Force on B.Ed. Colleges in total and resolved that the university should disaffiliate all erring colleges as per University guidelines and initiate necessary action as per recommendations of the Task Force.

When the interim report was placed before the Syndicate for its ratification on 12 December 2012, it was unanimously resolved to accept the Task Force report. However, in spite of unanimously accepting the Interim Report of the Task Force on affiliation / disaffiliation of B.Ed. Colleges, the Syndicate also resolved to grant affiliation to B.Ed. colleges (irrespective of their status as per Interim Report of the Task Force), by referring to the LIC Reports that were set-aside earlier. Further, the Syndicate also granted three months' time to the erring colleges to be compliant as per the Interim Report of the Task Force. When asked by press reporters on what the fate of students will be if the colleges failed to comply within three months, acting Vice-Chancellor N Rangaswamy said, "Students will have to risk joining these colleges."

On 10 January, the Karnataka Higher Education Department intervened by issuing a show-cause notice to the university, seeking on explanation on the Syndicate resolution.

Left-wing student organizations, including Student Federation of India, Vidyarthi Janata Dal, Dalit Students’ Federation, National Students’ Union of India and Democratic Youth Federation of India, have welcomed the State Government's move to question the Bangalore University (BU) Syndicate resolution on the report of the Task Force on B.Ed. colleges.

BU Registrar (Administration) T D Kemparaju on 16 January submitted a four-page reply to the government's show-cause notice. "The Task Force report has been accepted along with the Academic Council resolutions as per Section 59(9) and (17) of the Karnataka State Universities Act, 2000. Further, as per Section 63(2), only the Syndicate has the authority to decide matters pertaining to affiliation or disaffiliation by giving an opportunity for the concerned colleges to explain. Moreover, reports or recommendations by committees constituted by lawful authorities will become the basis for such decisions. If any decision is taken based on reports submitted by committees with no legality (reference to Task Force), it can be questioned in court," the reply stated. Task Force Chairman Karan Kumar termed the reply as ‘confusing, evasive and irrelevant’.

Later, Bangalore University officials apologised to the Higher Education Department for providing erroneous information in response to the show-cause notice the department had issued in regard to non-implementation of the B.Ed. Report of Task Force. Prof. Rangaswamy, acting Vice-Chancellor, claimed innocence and said whatever had happened was not his fault. He also claimed that he did not understand the High Court order and had merely acted on the advice of the university's legal advisor. "The order is highly confusing. We could not understand it. Even the university legal advisors did not understand it," he said. However, Prof. Rangaswamy chairs both the Academic Council and Syndicate meetings, and is thus in a position to be completely aware of the proceedings in these two bodies. When asked about this, Rangaswamy said he was "very confused" and needed to go through all the documents again.

Left-wing student organisations have come together to form a Progressive Student-Youth Forum to protest against the university's lack of will to implement the Task Force report. The Forum has demanded a probe by the Central Bureau of Investigation (CBI) into the B.Ed. Mafia, which is believed to have stretched across many states outside Karnataka.

Notwithstanding, the Karnataka government has ordered a Criminal Investigation Department (CID) probe into B.Ed. colleges affiliated to the university, which have been accused of issuing fake degree certificates to students from both within and outside the state.

Government of Karnataka passed an Order [ED 300 UBV 2012], dated 12 February 2013, directing the Bangalore University to implement the Task Force Report and annulling the contrary decision of the Syndicate of granting affiliation to B.Ed. & M.Ed. colleges based on ‘set-aside’ reports of LICs.

Further, the Principal Secretary, Higher Education, GoK wrote a letter, dated 14 March 2013, addressed to the Registrar, BU, on the progress made in implementing the Government Order [ED 300 UBV 2012] dated 12 February 2013.

In the meanwhile, the National Council for Teachers’ Education (NCTE) has withdrawn the recognition to flawed M.Ed. colleges affiliated to the Bangalore University. The decision to withdraw the recognition was taken during a meeting of the Southern Regional Committee (SRC) of NCTE held between 29 March – 1 April 2013, and was based on the report of the BU Task Force.

Nearly four months after it was announced, the State Government has officially ordered a Criminal Investigation Department (CID) probe into the alleged malpractices in teacher education colleges affiliated to Bangalore University (BU).

== Status of Seat Matrix for B.Ed. Education ==
There are 21,400 Government quota seats available in the State of Karnataka against the total applicants of 17,005. Again, 18,900 more seats are available in private colleges through management quota. Thereby, 40,300 B.Ed. seats are available statewide every year.

Similarly, in Bangalore University, there are 5,300 Government quota seats available other than 4,600 seats under management quota. In all, 9900 seats are available under Bangalore University.

But of late, only 40-50% Government seats are filled in time, leaving the rest in the hands of private managements. Thus, by obtaining permission from the Govt., these private managements bring in non-Karnataka students (mainly coming from Orissa, Bihar, Jharkhand, Chhattisgarh, Kerala and West Bengal) in a big way and offer off-campus programme. Some of these students are not able to communicate even in simple English. Since English is the official language of medium of instruction, it is astonishing how such students are admitted to the programme and eventually get their degree also. It speaks of gaping loopholes and compromises in the admission, instruction, examination and evaluation processes. Appropriate punitive and curative policy and administrative measures have to be put in place urgently.

== B.Ed. Final Report ==
The Task Force submitted its Final Report, on B.Ed. Colleges, to the Vice Chancellor, Bangalore University on 27 May 2013.
