= Priya Balasubramaniam =

American engineer

- Born: November 16, 1974 (age 52); India
- Education: Carmel Convent High School (B.E) Bangalore University (MBA) Michigan State University
- Organization(s): Asea Brown Boveri; Apple Inc.
- Known for: Vice President at Apple Inc.

Priya Balasubramaniam (born November 16, 1974) is an American engineer and business executive who is currently serving as the Vice President of Core Technologies Operations and iPhone Operations at Apple Inc.

== Education ==
Priya Balasubramaniam was born in India. She completed her Bachelor's degree in mechanical engineering from Bangalore University and an MBA in supply chain and marketing from Michigan State University.

== Career ==
Priya joined Apple Inc. in 2001. In June 2006 she became Director for Core Technologies Procurement which included touch panels, LCD and batteries. In July 2010 she became a Senior Director in the company. Since October 2014, she has worked as Vice President of Core Technologies & iPhone Operations.

While working at Apple she has been instrumental in negotiating a new deal to have Apple products manufactured in India, one of the world’s fastest-growing smartphone markets, and diversifying its supply chain beyond China. In September 2019, Apple confirmed its plans to expand to India following an easing of the country’s rules regarding foreign companies.

== Honors and awards ==
In December 2017, Balasubramaniam was awarded an honorary Doctorate of Engineering by Michigan State University.

In February 2017, she was named the fifth most powerful female engineer in an article published by Business Insider titled "The 43 most powerful female engineers of 2017".

In June 2018, she was named the fourth most powerful female engineer in the Business Insider article "The 39 most powerful female engineers of 2018".
