= Coolie =

Offensive term for a labourer from Asia

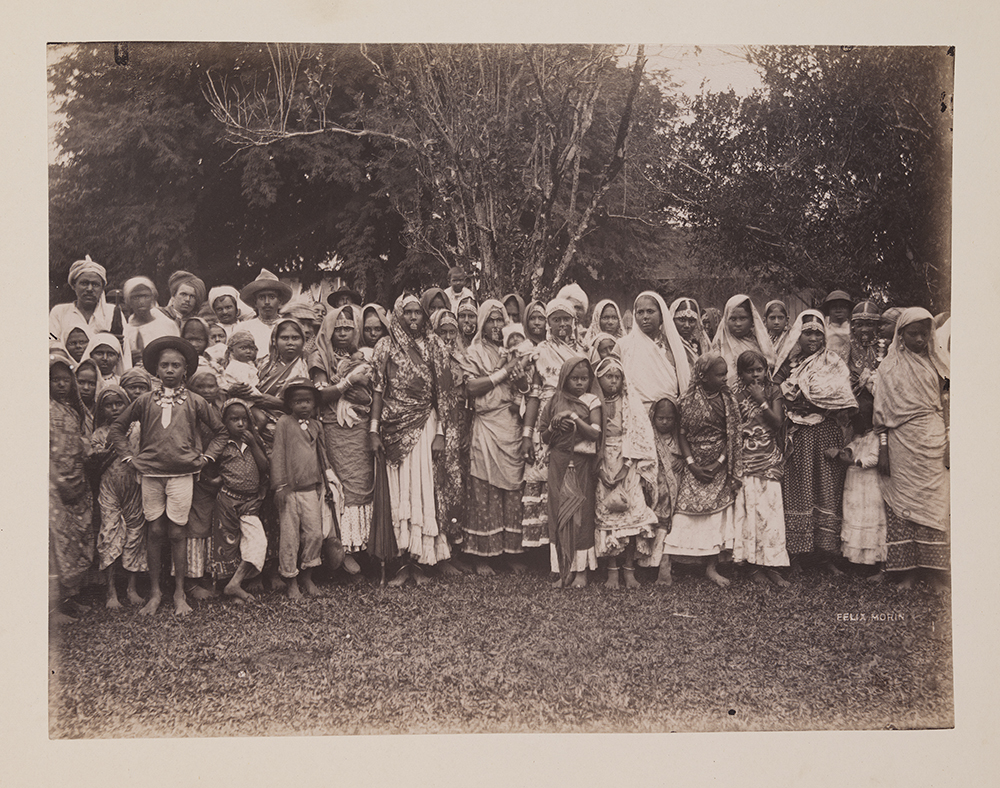
Indian labourers in British Trinidad and Tobago; around 1890s

Coolie (/ˈkuːli/) (Note: also spelled koelie, kouli, khuli, khulie, kuli, cooli, cooly, or quli) is a term historically used for low-wage labourers, typically those of Indian descent in the Caribbean and parts of Africa. The term was first used in the 16th century by European traders across the Indian Subcontinent. In the 18th century, it more commonly got passed down and referred to the generation who migrated as Indian indentured labourers to the Caribbean in the 19th century. During the British colonial era, the term was adopted and officially used during the transportation and forced employment of Indian labourers via employment contracts on sugar plantations formerly worked by African slaves.

The word has had a variety of negative connotations. In modern-day English, it is usually regarded as offensive. In the 21st century, coolie is generally considered a racial slur for Indians in Oceania, Africa, Southeast Asia, and the Americas (particularly in the Caribbean (varying)).

The word originated in the 17th-century Indian subcontinent and meant "day labourer"; starting in the 20th century, the word was used in British Raj India to refer to porters at railway stations. The term differs from the word "Dougla", although in Jamaica and parts of the Caribbean the term can be used for those of fully Indian descent or Dougla descent. Coolie is mostly used to refer to people of fully-blooded Indian descent whose ancestors migrated to the British and Dutch (as koelie) former colonies in Africa, Asia, and the Caribbean. This is particularly the case in South Africa, the Eastern African countries, Trinidad and Tobago, Guyana, Suriname, Jamaica, other parts of the Caribbean, Mauritius, Fiji, and the Malay Peninsula.

In modern Indian popular culture, coolies have often been portrayed as working-class heroes or anti-heroes. Indian films celebrating coolies include Deewaar (1975), Coolie (1983), Coolie (1995), Coolie (2025) and several films titled Coolie No. 1 (released in 1991, 1995, and 2020).

== Etymology ==
The term coolie is widely believed to have originated from the Tamil word கூலி (kūli, lit. 'hire, wages'). The word appears in the classical Tamil literature, including the Thirukkural (Kural 619), where it refers to the wage or reward earned through laborious effort:

தெய்வத்தான் ஆகா தெனினும் முயற்சிதன்
மெய்வருத்தக் கூலி தரும்.

The word is still commonly used in Tamil with the same meaning. During British colonial rule, Tamil-speaking labourers were among the first to be sent abroad as indentured workers, and the word spread to English and other Indian languages through colonial usage.

The term also appears in other Indian languages, such as Hindustani (Hindi-Urdu) क़ुली/قلی (qulī, lit. 'slave, servant') and Telugu కూలీ (kūlī, lit. 'day-labourer'). The slave meaning is derived from Chagatai قل (qul), ultimately from Proto-Turkic *kul (lit. 'servant, slave'). However, some scholars believe the Hindustani (Hindi-Urdu) usage may also have been influenced by Tamil.

The Dravidian root word kūli, meaning "wages", is found across most Dravidian languages except the North Dravidian branch.

Another theory suggests that the Hindustani (Hindi-Urdu) word qulī could have originated from the name of a tribal (i.e., Adivasi) or caste group in Gujarat.

In Chinese, the word 苦力 (Pinyin: kǔlì, lit. 'bitter strength'), is an example of phono-semantic matching of the Hindustani (Hindi-Urdu) word. Although unrelated etymologically, the term came to be used similarly by colonial powers to describe Chinese manual labourers.

The word coolies was recorded in English as early as 1727, when Engelbert Kaempfer described dock workers unloading Dutch merchant ships in Nagasaki, Japan.

== History of the coolie trade ==
=== Abolition of slavery and rise of the coolie trade ===
The importation of Asian labourers into European colonies occurred as early as the 17th century. However, in the 19th century, a far more robust system of trade involving coolies occurred, in direct response to the gradual abolition of both the Atlantic slave trade and slavery itself, which for centuries had served as the preferred mode of labour in European colonies in the Americas. The British were the first to experiment with coolie labour when, in 1806, two hundred Chinese labourers were transported to the colony of Trinidad to work on the plantations there. The "Trinidad experiment" was not a success, with only twenty to thirty labourers remaining in Trinidad by the 1820s. However, such efforts inspired Sir John Gladstone, one of the earliest proponents of coolie labour, to seek out coolies for his sugar plantations in British Guiana in the hopes of replacing his Afro-Caribbean labour force after the abolition of slavery there in 1833.

Social and political pressure led to the abolition of slavery throughout the British Empire in 1833, with other European nations eventually following suit. Labour-intensive work in European colonies, such as those involving plantations and mines, were left without a cheap source of manpower. As a consequence, a large-scale trade of primarily Indian and Chinese indentured labourers began in the 1820s to fill this need. In 1838, 396 South Asian workers arrived in British Guiana, and such a stream of migrant labour would continue until the First World War. Other European nations, especially colonial powers such as France, Spain, and Portugal, soon followed suit, especially as Britain, through several treaties such as Strangford Treaty and the Treaty of Paris of 1814, also pressured other nations to abolish their involvement in the Atlantic slave trade. In most European colonies, the importation of Asian labourers began in earnest after the abolition of slavery. However, in some colonies, such as Cuba, slavery would not end until 1886, about forty years after coolies were introduced.

A number of contemporary and modern historians noted the influence of the old form of colonial slavery on the coolie system. The coolie trade, much like the slave trade, was intended to provide a labour force for colonial plantations in the Americas and the Pacific whose cash crops were in high demand across the Atlantic World. Coolies frequently worked on slave plantations which had been previously worked by African slaves, and similarly brutal treatment could be meted out by plantation overseers in response to real or perceived offences. On some Caribbean plantations, the numbers of coolies present could reach up to six hundred. In 1878, historian W. L. Distant wrote an article for the Journal of the Royal Anthropological Institute, detailing his time spent on West Indian plantations observing the work ethic and behaviours of coolies, and noted that many overseers believed that Asian coolies, much like African slaves, held an affinity for intensive outdoor labour work. The views of overseers towards coolies differed based on ethnicity: Chinese and Japanese coolies were perceived to be harder working, more unified as a labour force, and maintained better hygiene habits in comparison to Indian labourers, who were viewed as being lower in status and treated as children who required constant supervision.

=== Debates over coolie labour ===
Unlike slavery, coolie labour was (in theory) under contract, consensual, paid, and temporary, with the coolie able to regain complete freedom after their term of service. Regulations were put in place as early as 1837 by the British authorities in India to safeguard these principles of voluntary, contractual work and safe, sanitary transportation. The Chinese government also made efforts to secure the well-being of their nation's workers, with representatives being sent to relevant governments around the world. Some Western abolitionists saw coolie labour as paving the way towards abolition, to gradually and peacefully replace African slave labour without loss of profit. However, other abolitionist groups and individuals – such as the British Anti-Slavery Society and the British and Foreign Anti-Slavery Society, along with American abolitionist William Lloyd Garrison – were highly critical of coolie labour. Proslavery advocates, particularly in the Southern United States, condemned coolie labour but used it to argue against the abolition of American slavery, claiming the latter was more "humane" than the former.

In practice, however, as many opponents of the system argued, abuse and violence in the coolie trade was rampant. Some of these labourers signed employment contracts based on misleading promises, while others were kidnapped and sold into servitude; some were victims of clan violence whose captors sold them to coolie merchants, while others sold themselves to pay off gambling debts. Those who did sign on voluntarily generally had contracts of two to five years. In addition to having their passage paid for, coolies were also paid under twenty cents per day on average. However, in certain regions, roughly a dollar would be taken from coolies every month in order to pay off their debts.

=== Chinese coolies ===
==== In European colonies ====
Workers from China were mainly transported to work in Peru and Cuba. However, many Chinese labourers worked in British colonies such as Singapore, New South Wales, Jamaica, British Guiana (now Guyana), British Malaya, Trinidad and Tobago, British Honduras (now Belize), as well as in the Dutch colonies within the Dutch East Indies and Suriname. The first shipment of Chinese labourers was to the British colony of Trinidad in 1806 "in an attempt to establish a settlement of free peasant cultivators and labourers". On many of the voyages, the labourers were transported on the same vessels that had been used to transport African slaves in previous years.

The coolie slave trade run by American captains and local agents, mainly consisting of debt slavery, was called the 'pig trade' as the living conditions were not dissimilar to that of livestock; on some vessels as many as 40 per cent of the coolies died en route. As many as 500 were crammed into a single ship hold, leaving no room to move. The coolies were also stamped on their backs like livestock. Foreign merchants took advantage of the unequal treaties negotiated between the Qing government and Western powers after the Opium Wars, as well as the resulting political and economic instability, to broker deals for "contracted" workers. Anglophone capitalists referred to the opium trade and captive Chinese labour as "poison and pigs".

Portuguese Macao was the centre of coolie slavery: it was described as "the only real business" in Macao from 1848 to 1873, generating enormous profits for the Portuguese until it was banned due to pressure from the British government. Between 1851 and 1874 approximately 215,000 Chinese were shipped from Macau overseas, primarily to Cuba and Peru, with some being shipped to Guiana, Suriname, and Costa Rica. These coolies were obtained via a variety of sources, including some who were entrapped by brokers in Macau through loans for gambling, and others who were kidnapped or coerced.

In 1847, two ships from Cuba transported workers to Havana to work in the sugar cane fields from the port of Amoy (Xiamen), one of the five Chinese treaty ports opened to the British by the Treaty of Nanking in 1842. The trade soon spread to other ports in Guangdong, and demand became particularly strong in Peru for workers in the silver mines and the guano collecting industry. Australia began importing workers in 1848. These workers were deceived about their terms of employment to a much greater extent than their Indian counterparts, and consequently, there was a much higher level of Chinese emigration during this period.

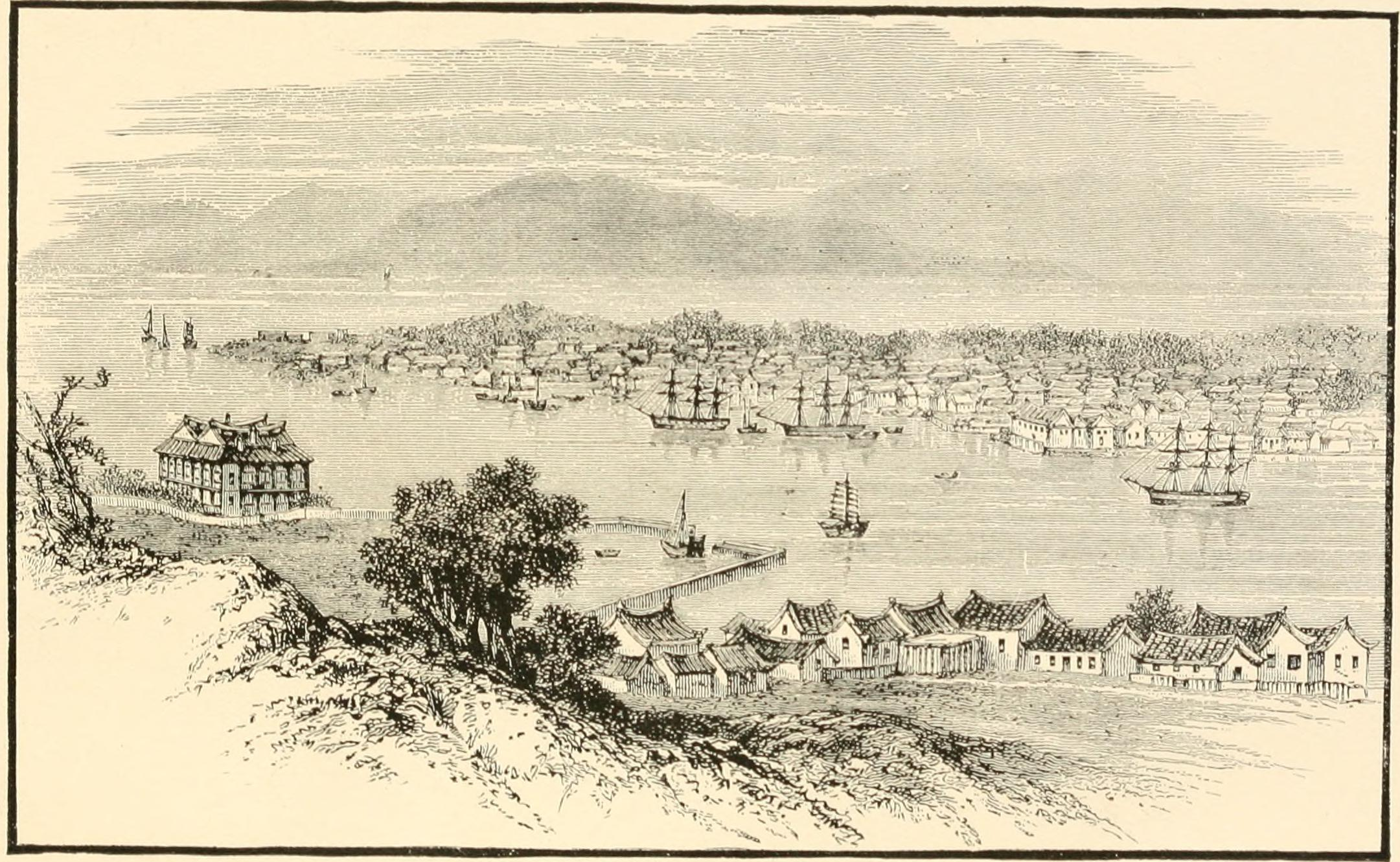
Illustration of the port of Amoy, where many Chinese labourers were shipped to foreign lands.

The trade flourished from 1847 to 1854 without incident, until reports began to surface of the mistreatment of the workers in Cuba and Peru. As the British government had political and legal responsibility for many of the ports involved – including Amoy – such ports were immediately closed. Despite these closures, the trade simply shifted to the more accommodating port within the Portuguese enclave of Macau.

Many coolies were first deceived or kidnapped, and then kept in barracoons (detention centres) or loading vessels in the ports of departure, as were African slaves. Their voyages, which are sometimes called the Pacific Passage, were as inhumane and dangerous as the notorious Middle Passage of the Atlantic slave trade. Mortality was very high; it is estimated that from 1847 to 1859, the average mortality rate for coolies aboard ships to Cuba was 15.2%, and losses among ships to Peru were as high as 40% in the 1850s, and 30.4% from 1860 to 1863.

Coolies were sold and taken to work in plantations or mines with very bad living and working conditions. The duration of a contract was typically five to eight years, but many coolies did not live out their term of service due to hard labour and mistreatment. Survivors were often forced to remain in servitude beyond the contracted period. The 1860 Reglamento para la introducción de trabajadores chinos a la isla de Cuba (Regulation for the Introduction of Chinese Workers to the Island of Cuba) passed in Cuba. This regulation stipulated that the Coolie workers must recontract with their previous employer or another employer or they must leave Cuba at their own expense within 2 months after the end of their contract. Coolies were usually unable to afford to leave Cuba and were forced to recontract. This regulation blurred the distinction between indentured servitude and slavery. It allowed for the Coolies to serve as a source of semi-captive labour given the intentional difficulty of returning home.

The coolies who worked on the sugar plantations in Cuba and in the guano beds of the Chincha Islands ('the islands of Hell') of Peru were treated brutally. 75% of the Chinese coolies in Cuba died before fulfilling their contracts. More than two-thirds of the Chinese coolies who arrived in Peru between 1849 and 1874 died within the contract period. In 1860, it was calculated that of the 4,000 coolies brought to the Chinchas since the trade began, not one had survived.

Because of these unbearable conditions, Chinese coolies often revolted against their Chinese bosses and foreign company bosses at ports of departure, on ships, and in foreign lands. The coolies were put in the same neighbourhoods as Africans and, since most were unable to return to their homeland or have their wives come to the New World, many married African women. The coolies' interracial relationships and marriages with Africans, Europeans, and Indigenous peoples, formed some of the modern world's Afro-Asian and Asian Latin American populations.

In Spanish, coolies were referred to as colonos asiáticos ('Asian colonists'). The Spanish colony of Cuba feared slave uprisings such as those that took place in Haiti, and used coolies as a transition between slaves and free labour. They were neither free nor slaves. Indentured Chinese servants also laboured in the sugarcane fields of Cuba well after the 1884 abolition of slavery in the country. Two scholars of Chinese labour in Cuba, Juan Pastrana and Juan Pérez de la Riva, substantiated horrific conditions of Chinese coolies in Cuba and stated that coolies were slaves in all but name. Researcher Denise Helly believes that despite their slave-like treatment, the free and legal status of the Asian labourers in Cuba separated them from slaves. According to Rodriguez Pastor and Trazegnies Granda, the coolies could challenge their superiors, run away, petition government officials, and rebel.

By 1870, labour contractors called enganchadores were used to manage and negotiate the contracts for Chinese Coolies in organised labour squads called Cuadrillas. "The enganchador negotiated all terms of work for his squad and handled all aspects of employment for the workers, including obtaining advances from the planters for salaries, distributing tools, arranging housing and food, and assuming responsibility for discipline, control, and supervision." (Hu-DeHart). The enganchador had flexibility in the length of the Coolies' recontract. The Coolie was also able to negotiate their wages and often had the upper hand as the employer had to yield to market forces. "Recontracting terms varied considerably. A batch of recontracts from the period 1863 to 1877 reveals great variation in the terms of the new contracts, diverging not only from the original ones, but from each other. First, most coolies signed up for only one year, at most two years, and some for as few as three and six months – all far short of another eight years. Second, the monthly wages not only varied, but were always greater than the 4 pesos in the original contracts, in some cases significantly greater. Many specified payment in "peso fuerte," that is, hard currency, not vouchers, which was often used during the eight year original indenture." (Hu-DeHart).

Once they had fulfilled their contracts, colonos asiáticos integrated into the countries of Peru, the Dominican Republic, Puerto Rico, and Cuba. They adopted cultural traditions from the natives and welcomed non-Chinese to experience and participate in their traditions. Before the Cuban Revolution in 1959, Havana had Latin America's largest Chinatown.

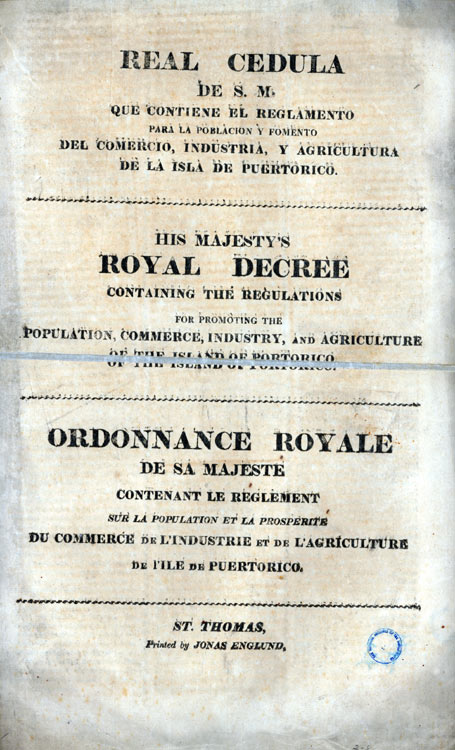
The Royal Decree of Graces of 1815, a legal order approved by the Spanish Crown to encourage foreign settlement of the colonies of Cuba and Puerto Rico

From c. 1902–1910, the Chinese Engineering and Mining Company (Note: Herbert Hoover was a company director before becoming US President.) was instrumental in supplying Chinese coolie labour to South African mines at the request of mine owners, who considered such labour cheaper than native African and white labour. The horrendous conditions suffered by Indian coolie labourers in South Africa led some politicians in the British Parliament to question the coolie system.

In 1866, the British, French and Chinese governments agreed to mitigate the abuse by requiring all traders to pay for the return of all workers after their contract ended. The employers in the British West Indies declined these conditions, bringing the trade there to an end. Until the trade was finally abolished in 1875, over 150,000 coolies had been sold to Cuba alone, the majority having been shipped from Macau. These labourers endured conditions far worse than those experienced by their Indian counterparts. Even after the 1866 reforms, the scale of abuse and conditions of near slavery did not get any better – if anything they deteriorated. In the early 1870s, an increased media exposure of the trade led to a public outcry, and the British, as well as the Chinese government, put pressure on the Portuguese colonial authorities in Macau to bring the trade there to an end; this was ultimately achieved in 1874. By that time, a total of up to half a million Chinese workers had been exported. However, by 1890, there were still newspaper reports of coolie labour being used in Madagascar.

The term coolie was also applied to Chinese workers recruited for contracts on cacao plantations in German Samoa. German planters went to great lengths to secure access to their coolie labour supply from China. In 1908, a Chinese commissioner, Lin Shu Fen, reported on the cruel treatment of coolie workers on German plantations in the western Samoan Islands. The trade began largely after the establishment of colonial German Samoa in 1900 and lasted until the arrival of New Zealand forces in 1914. More than 2,000 Chinese coolies were present in the islands in 1914 and most were eventually repatriated by the New Zealand administration.

==== In the United States ====
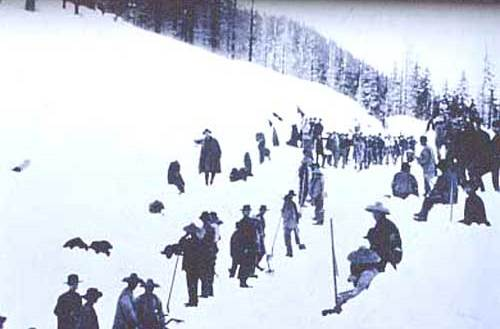
Chinese immigrant workers building the first transcontinental railroad in the US

Debates over coolie labour and slavery was key in shaping the history of Chinese immigrants in the US. In February 1862, "An Act to Prohibit the 'Coolie Trade' by American Citizens in American vessels", also known as the Anti-Coolie Act, was signed into law by Abraham Lincoln, which prohibited US citizens and residents from trading in Chinese subjects, known as "coolies". In one aspect, the Anti-Coolie Act was the last of the US slave trade laws, as well as the beginning of the end of slavery; in September of that year, Lincoln would also issue the Emancipation Proclamation. In another aspect, it was the beginning of Chinese exclusion in the US and the beginning of federal immigration restriction. Within a decade, significant levels of anti-Chinese sentiment had built up, stoked by populists such as Denis Kearney with racist slogans – "To an American, death is preferable to life on a par with the Chinese."

In 1868, the Burlingame Treaty would ensure certain protections for Chinese immigrants in the US and emphasise that any Chinese immigration to the US must be free and voluntary, reaffirming that "coolies", being unfree, were unwelcome and prohibited from entering the US. In 1875, Congress passed the Page Act, which prohibited the bringing of any Chinese subjects without their consent in order to hold them for a term of service. In 1882, the Chinese Exclusion Act barred the entry of any Chinese labourer to the US.

Despite attempts to restrict the influx of cheap labour from China, beginning in the 1870s Chinese workers helped construct a vast network of levees in the Sacramento-San Joaquin River Delta. These levees made thousands of acres of fertile marshlands available for agricultural production. Although Chinese workers contributed to the building of the first transcontinental railroad in the United States and of the Canadian Pacific Railway in western Canada, Chinese settlement was discouraged after completion of the construction. State legislation, such as California's Foreign Miners' Tax Act of 1850 and 1852, would target Chinese immigrants in the US. The 1879 Constitution of California declared that "Asiatic coolieism is a form of human slavery, and is forever prohibited in this State, and all contracts for coolie labour shall be void."

In 1938, US President Franklin D. Roosevelt used the term in one of his fireside chats (Number 13, 24 July 1938) while telling a story about "two Chinese coolies" arguing in a crowd.

==== In South America ====
In South America, Chinese indentured labourers worked in Peru's silver mines and coastal industries (i.e., guano, sugar, and cotton) from the early 1850s to the mid-1870s; about 100,000 people immigrated as indentured workers. They participated in the War of the Pacific, looting and burning down the haciendas where they worked after the capture of Lima by the invading Chilean army in January 1880. Some 2,000 coolies even joined the Chilean Army in Peru, taking care of the wounded and burying the dead. Others were sent by Chileans to work in the newly conquered nitrate fields.

=== Indian coolies ===
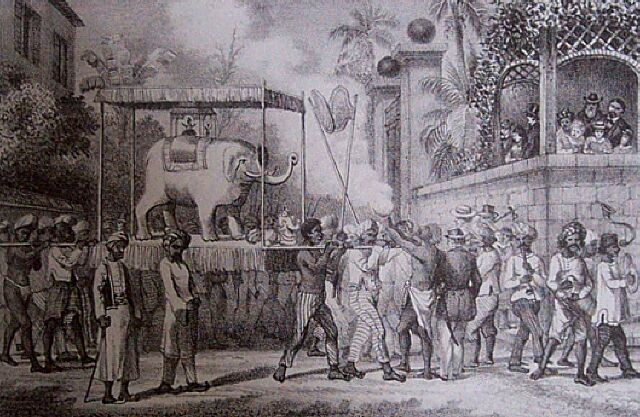
Hindu festival for the indentured Indian workers, on the French colony Réunion (19th century).

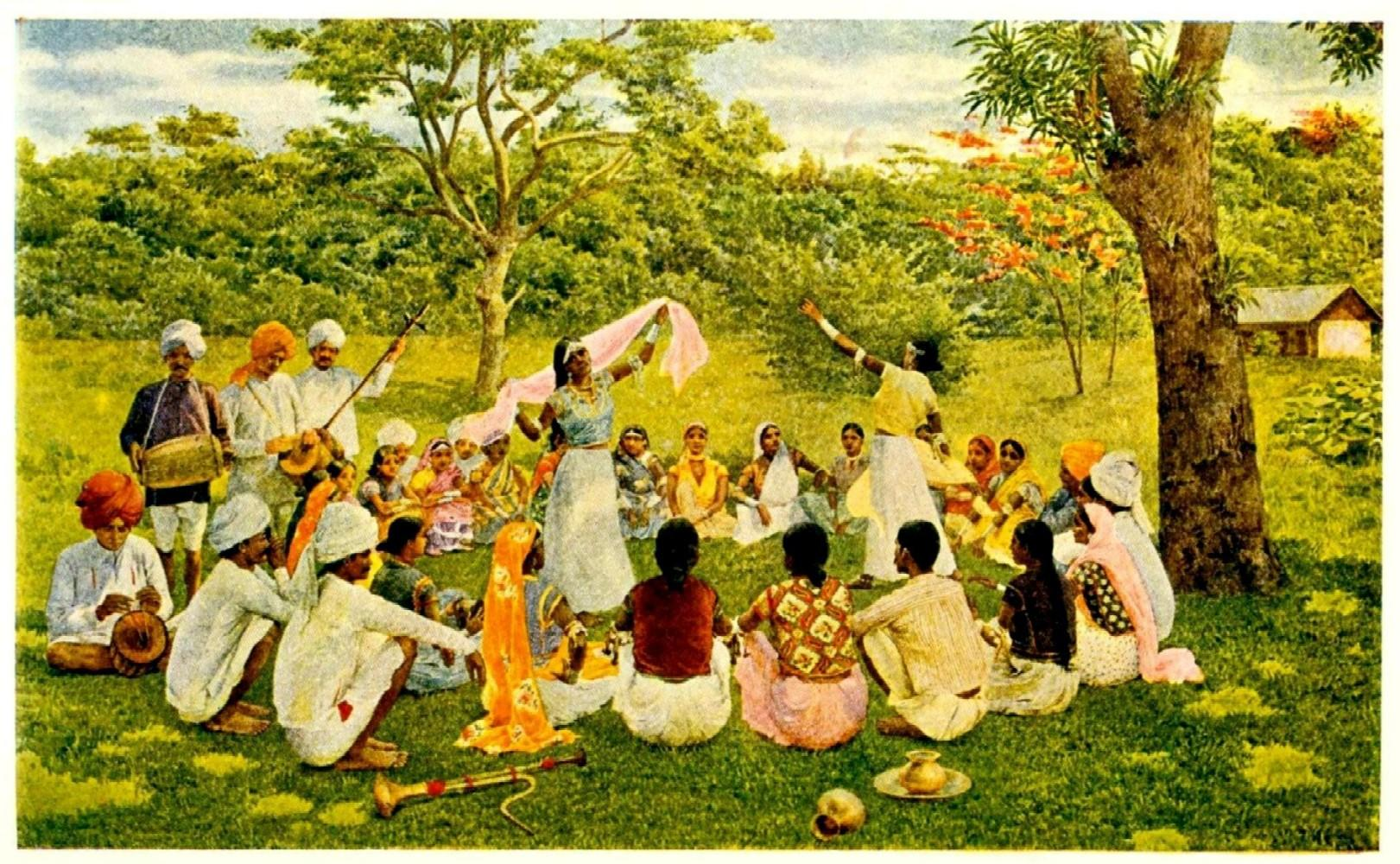
Indentured Indo-Trinidadian and Tobagonian singing and dancing on an estate in Trinidad and Tobago.

By the 1820s, many Indians were voluntarily enlisting to go abroad for work, in the hopes of a better life. European merchants and businessmen quickly took advantage of this and began recruiting them for work as a cheap source of labour. British merchants began transporting Indians to colonies around the world, including Mauritius, Fiji, New South Wales, Natal, Kenya, Tanganyika, Somaliland, Bechuanaland, Seychelles, Uganda, Northern Rhodesia, Southern Rhodesia, Nyasaland, British Guiana, Trinidad and Tobago, Jamaica, Saint Lucia, Saint Vincent and the Grenadines, Grenada, Saint Kitts and Nevis, British Honduras, Barbados, the rest of the British West Indies, and British Malaya. The Dutch shipped workers to labour on the plantations on Surinam, the Netherlands Antilles, and the Dutch East Indies. The French shipped labourers to Guadeloupe, Martinique, French Guiana, the rest of the French West Indies, and Réunion.

A system of agents was used to infiltrate the rural villages of India and recruit labourers. They would often deceive the credulous workers about the great opportunities that awaited them for their own material betterment abroad. The Indians primarily came from the Indo-Gangetic Plain, but also from Tamil Nadu and other areas to the south of the country. Indians had faced a great number of social and economic disasters, causing them to be more eager than other groups to leave India. In the last part of the nineteenth century alone, there were 24 famines.

Without permission from the British colonial authorities, the French transported Indian workers to their Pacific colony, Réunion, from as early as 1826. By 1830, over 3,000 labourers had been transported. After this trade was discovered, the French successfully negotiated with the British in 1860 for permission to transport over 6,000 workers annually, on condition that the trade would be suspended if abuses were discovered to be taking place.

The British began to transport Indians to Mauritius starting in 1829. Slavery was abolished there in 1833, with Mauritian planters receiving two million pounds sterling in compensation for the loss of their slaves. The planters turned to bringing in a large number of indentured labourers from India to work in the sugar cane fields. Between 1834 and 1921, around half a million indentured labourers were present on the island. They worked on sugar estates, factories, in transport, and on construction sites.

In 1837, the British East India Company issued a set of regulations for the trade. The rules provided for each labourer to be personally authorised for transportation by an officer designated by the company, limited the length of service to five years subject to voluntary renewal, made the contractor responsible for returning the worker after the contract elapsed, and required the vessels to conform to basic health standards.

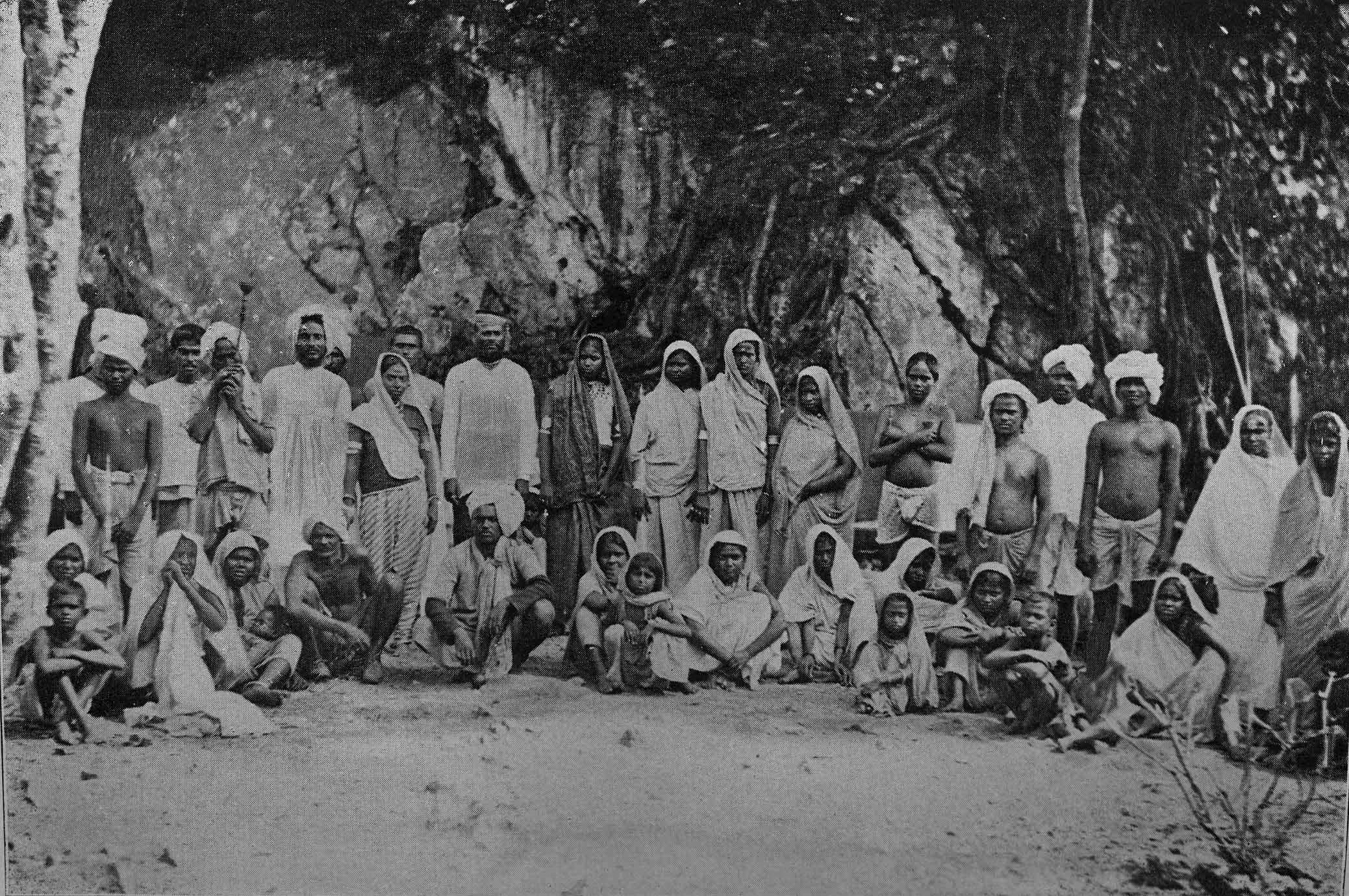
Newly arrived Indian labourers in Trinidad.

Despite this, conditions on the ships were often extremely crowded, with rampant disease and malnutrition. Coolies were also not informed about the length of the trip or about the island that they would be going to. The workers were paid a pittance for their labour, and were expected to work in often awful and harsh conditions. Although there were no large-scale scandals involving coolie abuse in British colonies, workers often ended up being forced to work, and manipulated in such a way that they became dependent on the plantation owners so that in practice they remained there long after their contracts expired; possibly as little as 10% of the coolies actually returned to their original country of origin. Colonial legislation was also passed to severely limit their freedoms; in Mauritius, a compulsory pass system was instituted to enable their movements to be easily tracked. Conditions were much worse in the French colonies of Réunion, Guadeloupe, and Martinique, where workers were 'systematically overworked' and abnormally high mortality rates were recorded for those working in the mines. Generally, Indian coolies were noted to have higher mortality rates as a whole, and were less likely to be able to return home. Companies would often promise good food, durable clothing, adequate housing, safe passage, and schools. However, these promises were rarely kept, leading to the higher mortality rate and image of Indian coolies being "dirty".

The voyage itself was often a highly dangerous venture, especially for coolie women. Though some ships had made attempts to prevent assault, rape, and general mistreatment in sailor contracts, these crimes were still common. Even with punishments in place, on ship and land, men who assaulted women and children were rarely punished, leaving women in an even more vulnerable position.

However, there were also attempts by the British authorities to regulate and mitigate the worst abuses. Workers were regularly checked up on by health inspectors, and they were vetted before transportation to ensure that they were suitably healthy and fit to be able to endure the rigours of labour. Children under the age of 15 were not allowed to be transported from their parents under any circumstances.

The first campaign in England against the coolie trade likened the system of indentured labour to the slavery of the past. The campaign against coolie emigration was led by Joseph Sturge, with the Society of Friends. Petitions from Sturge, the Society of Friends, various other humanitarian groups, and from citizens of entire cities were routinely sent to the Colonial Offices. In response to this pressure, the labour export was temporarily stopped in 1839 by the authorities when the scale of the abuses became known, but it was soon renewed due to its growing economic importance. A more rigorous regulatory framework was put into place and severe penalties were imposed for infractions in 1842. In that year, almost 35,000 people were shipped to Mauritius.

In 1844, the trade was expanded to the colonies in the West Indies, including Jamaica, Trinidad, and Demerara, where the Asian population was soon a major component of the island demographic.

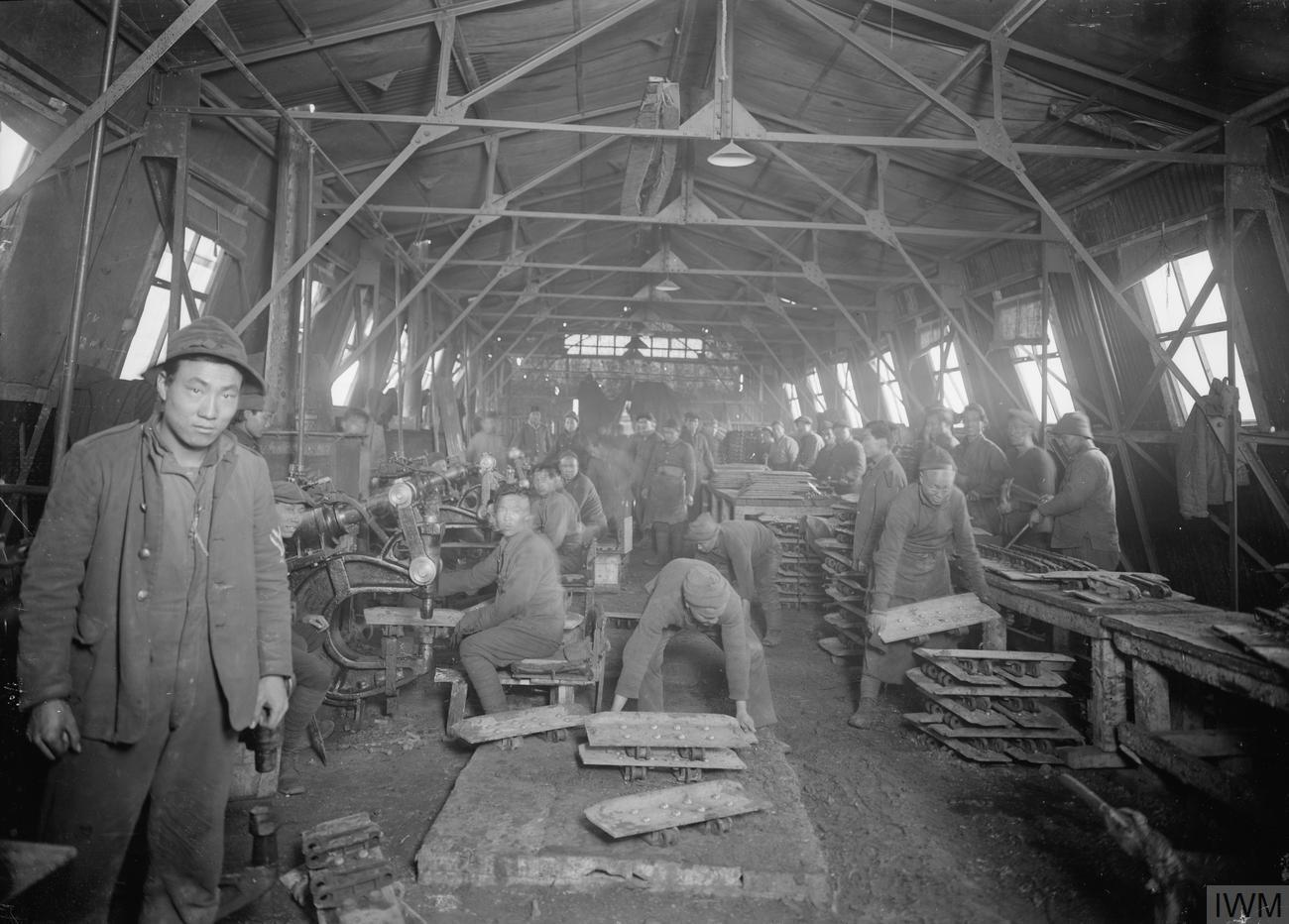
Members of the Chinese Labour Corps carry out riveting work at the Central Workshops of the Royal Tank Regiment.

Starting in 1879, many Indians were transported to Fiji to work on the sugarcane plantations. Many of them chose to stay after their term of indenture elapsed, and today their descendants account for about 40% of the total population. Indian workers were also imported into the Dutch colony of Surinam after the Dutch signed a treaty with the United Kingdom on the recruitment of contract workers in 1870. In Mauritius, the Indian population is now demographically dominant, with Indian festivals being celebrated as national holidays.

This system prevailed until the early twentieth century. Increasing focus on the brutalities and abuses of the trade by the sensationalist media of the time incited public outrage and led to the official ending of the coolie trade in 1916 by the British government. By that time, tens of thousands of Chinese workers were being used along the Western Front by the allied forces (see Chinese Labour Corps).

=== Sex ratios and intermarriage among coolies ===
A major difference between the Chinese and Indian coolie trades was that women and children were brought from India, along with men, while Chinese coolies were 99% male. Although there are reports of ships (so called 'coolie ships') for Asian coolies carrying women and children, the great majority of them carried men. This led to a high rate of Chinese men marrying women of other ethnicities, such as Indian women and mixed-race Creole women.

The contrast in the female-to-male ratio between Indian and Chinese immigrants has been compared by historians. In Sumatra in the Dutch East Indies, just 18,731 Chinese women and 92,985 Chinese men served as coolies on plantations. Chinese women migrated less than Javanese and Indian women as indentured coolies. The number of Chinese women as coolies was "very small" while Chinese men were easily taken into the coolie trade. In Cuba, men made up the vast majority of Chinese indentured servants on sugar plantations; in Peru, the male Chinese coolies intermarried with local non-Chinese women due to the lack of Chinese women. Due to the severe shortage of women compared to men among the Indian coolies, some of the women engaged in Polyandry. Between 1845 and 1917, twenty-five per cent of all Indians brought to the Caribbean were women. With women as a severe minority, their morality was questioned and the actions of men as a result of having so few women was blamed on the women. Between 1858 and 1859, laws were put into place stating that the ratio of men to women could not exceed 2:1, whereas before it was 3:1. However, there continued to be a severe shortage of women. This gave women a new sense of power when it came to choosing a partner. With a shortage of women, it became the responsibility of the male suitor to provide a hefty dowry to a woman's father, regardless of what caste she came from. Unfortunately, this also put women in a very vulnerable position, especially when alone. Rape was a common occurrence, and there were accounts of women being bound and gagged in their own homes by men. Between 1872 and 1900, it was reported that 87 women were murdered, with 65 of those being married women who were accused of being unfaithful.

The scarcity of Indian women in the Caribbean may not have been completely due to the women's inability to perform the work required of them. Many coolie women saw the chance to leave for the Caribbean as a way to escape abusive husbands, to hide pregnancy, to escape shame, or to simply find a better life. The 1883 Indian Immigration Act aimed to stop women from escaping their abusive husbands, which in turn made it much more difficult for women to emigrate, partially because an agent was usually needed to travel to the woman's village to verify her identity.

Chinese women were scarce in every place where Chinese indentured labourers were brought; the migration was dominated by Chinese men. Up to the 1940s, men made up the vast majority of the Costa Rican Chinese community. Similarly, males made up the majority of the original Chinese community in Mexico, and they often married Mexican women.

One stark difference between Indian and Chinese coolies was the treatment of women, despite both groups having a severe shortage. Crimes against women (including murder) were far more frequent among Indian coolies. This was simply because there were so few Chinese women. However, it became common for people to instead believe that Indians murder their women while Chinese women stay alive because, unlike their Indian counterparts, they are chaste.

In the early 1900s, the Chinese communities in Manila, Singapore, Mauritius, New Zealand, Victoria in Australia, the United States, and Victoria in British Columbia in Canada were all male dominated. Though the lack of women became a problem in later years, initially women were not a high priority during coolie recruitment. Generally, it was believed that women were unwilling to perform the hard outdoor labour. Those willing to perform it were still seen as not as good as men.

Some Chinese coolies managed to avoid racial discrimination laws in Cuba and marry white women. This could be done by being listed as 'white' on their baptism certificates, as the agency that recruited them was meant for settling white people in Cuba. A Chinese coolie in Cuba also mentioned a white female master in a deposition.

=== Legislation ===
In 2000, the parliament of South Africa enacted the Promotion of Equality and Prevention of Unfair Discrimination Act, 2000. Section 10 covers the prohibition of hate speech terms, such as 'coolie' (koelie). The main objectives of the Act were:

- To promote equality
- To prohibit and prevent unfair discrimination (either on the basis of age, race, sex, disability, language, religion, culture, etc.)
- To prevent hate speech (e.g. calling people names such as kaffir, koelies, hotnot, etc.)
- To prevent harassment.

== Modern use ==
- In Indonesian, kuli is most commonly for unskilled workers relying on their physical strength for transporting goods. It was previously used to refer to Indian or Chinese labourers, with a pejorative connotation.
- In India, the Hindustani (Hindi-Urdu) word qulī is now commonly used to refer to luggage porters at hotel lobbies and railway and bus stations. Nevertheless, the use of such (especially by foreigners) may still be regarded as a slur by some. The phrase 'brown coolie' is a term used for an Indian citizen who is posturing as a representative to a foreign institute.
- In Malaysia, kuli is a term for manual labourers, with somewhat negative connotations.
- In Thai, kuli (กุลี) still retains its original meaning as manual labourers, but is considered to be offensive. In September 2005, Prime Minister Thaksin Shinawatra of Thailand used this term when referring to the labourers who built the new international airport. He thanked them for their hard work. Reuters, a news source from Bangkok, reported that Thai labour groups were angered by his use of the term.
- In South Africa, the term coolie referred to indentured workers from India. It is no longer an accepted term, and both it and its Zulu version, amakhula, are considered extremely derogatory for people of Indian descent.
- In Ethiopia, cooli are those who carry heavy loads for someone. However, the word is not a slur. It refers to Arab day-labourers who migrated to Ethiopia for labour work.
- The Dutch word koelie refers to a worker who performs very hard, exacting labour. The word generally has no particular ethnic connotations among the Dutch, but it is a racial slur among Surinamese of Indian heritage.
- In Vietnamese, since the French Indochina era, "cu li" or "culi", as a Vietnamese pronunciation for coolie, is still used with the offensive mearning for low-paid labourer.
- In Finland, when freshmen of a technical university take care of student union club tasks (usually arranging a party or such activity), they are referred as "kuli" or performing a "kuli duty".
- In Guyana, Trinidad and Tobago, Suriname, Jamaica, Belize, Saint Lucia, Saint Vincent and the Grenadines, Saint Kitts and Nevis, Grenada, French Guiana, Guadeloupe, Martinique, Barbados, Virgin Islands, other parts of the Caribbean, Mauritius, South Africa, Seychelles, other parts of Southeast Africa, Fiji, Singapore, and Malaysia, coolie was used loosely to refer to anyone of Indian and other South Asian descent and is considered an offensive pejorative.
- In some English-speaking countries, the conical hat worn by many Asians to protect themselves from the sun is sometimes called a "coolie hat".
- In the information technology industry, offshore workers are sometimes referred to as coolies because of their lower wages.
- The term coolie appears in the Eddy Howard song, "The Rickety Rickshaw Man".
- In Hungarian, kulimunka (lit. 'coolie work') refers to back-breaking, repetitive work.
- In Sri Lanka, kuliwada is the Sinhala term for manual labour. Also, kuli (e.g., kuliyata) means working for a fee, notably instant (cash) payment (and not salaried). It is used in a derogatory or jesting manner to signify biased action or support (e.g., "Kuliyata andanawa" means "Crying for a fee", since in colonial times people would be paid to cry at funerals). Taxis are known as kuli-ratha.
- In Filipino, makuli translates to "industrious", which carries connotations of slavishness.
- In Greek, κούλης is used as a neutral word to mean "ship worker of Asian origin" by the Greek poet Nikos Kavvadias.
- In German, a baggage cart is also known as a Kofferkuli (lit. 'suitcase coolie').

== In art, entertainment, and media ==
=== Films ===
Deewaar (1975) is an Indian crime drama written by Salim–Javed about a dockyard coolie, Vijay Verma (Amitabh Bachchan), who turns to a life of crime and becomes a Bombay underworld smuggler, inspired by the real-life Indian mafia don Haji Mastan. Coolie (1983) is an Indian Bollywood film about a coolie, Iqbal Aslam Khan (Amitabh Bachchan), who works at a railway station; the film gained notoriety for the fact that during filming, Bachchan suffered a near-fatal injury during a fight sequence. Additional Indian films about coolies include Coolie No. 1 (1991), Coolie (1995), Coolie No. 1 (1995), Coolie (2004), Coolie No. 1 (2019), Coolie No. 1 (2020) and Coolie (2025).

=== Music ===
The 2014 chutney song titled "Coolie Bai Dance" by the Indo-Guyanese singer Romeo "Mystic" Nermal is about the lifestyle of the traditional "coolie" (Indo-Caribbean) villagers in Guyana and the rest of the Caribbean.

== See also ==
- Coolie-Begar movement
- Blackbirding
- Chink
- Dasa
- Dougla
- Navvy
- Veth
- List of ethnic slurs
- Coolitude
