= B K Thelma =

Indian geneticist

Bittianda Kuttapa Thelma
- Born: 1955 (age 70–71)
- Education: Bangalore University, University of Delhi
- Known for: Human Genetics
- Scientific career
- Fields: Cytogenetics and Human Genetics
- Workplaces: Department of Genetics, University of Delhi

B K Thelma commonly known as Bittianda Kuttapa Thelma is a professor in the Department of Genetics at the University of Delhi, South Campus, New Delhi, India. She is the Principal investigator and Co-ordinator of the Centre of excellence on Genomes Sciences and Predictive Medicine funded by the Govt. of India. She is also the Co-ordinator of a major project on newborn screening for inborn errors of metabolism in Delhi state which aims to demonstrate the feasibility of mandatory screening of newborns in the country and to generate epidemiological data for the testable IEMs in the genetically distinct Indian population, for the first time.

Discovery genomics is the major thrust of her research and ongoing projects include genetic analysis of complex traits including brain and inflammatory disorders and Mendelian forms of neurological and neuropsychiatric diseases. Her most recent engagement is in the area of Ayurgenomics wherein individuals can be deep phenotyped based on the principles of Ayurveda to obtain homogeneous case-control cohorts to be used for disease gene mapping. This approach is expected to overcome the issue of clinical/phenotypic heterogeneity which is a major limitation in contemporary complex trait genetics research.

== Research ==
Her recent academic accomplishments include i) identification of novel risk genes/loci for two inflammatory conditions namely Rheumatoid arthritis & Ulcerative colitis by the first ever GWAS conducted in the genetically distinct north Indian population; ii) discovery of new causal genes namely MID2 for X-linked Intellectual Disability; PODXL and RIC3 genes for familial Parkinson's disease by exome sequencing approach; and iii) demonstration of differences/similarities between the two major Indian subpopulations namely south and north Indians using both SNP array based and exome sequencing approaches. She has several national and international collaborative projects and has over 90 peer reviewed publications to her credit. She is a fellow of all three science academies in India, has served as a member of the Scientific Advisory Council to the Prime Minister of India; National Science and Engineering Research Board and Human Genetics/Medical genomics task force of funding agencies including the Department of Biotechnology and Indian council of Medical research, Government of India. Delhi. She has taught courses in Human Genetics, Human and Medical Biotechnology, Cytogenetics, Recombinant DNA technology, Prokaryotic and Eukaryotic gene expression, Molecular systematics and evolution, and Cell biology. Her 2017 publication, Attempts to replicate genetic associations with schizophrenia in a cohort from north India was published in Nature.As of Dec 2019, she has 5135 citation on google scholar, with an h-index of 34 and i10 index of 77.

== Education and career ==
Thelma completed her BSc and MSc in zoology from Bangalore University in 1973 and 1975 respectively. She pursued PhD in biomedical research in 1982 from the University of Delhi. Thelma had a short stint as postdoctoral fellow in the Human Genetics Laboratory at Children's Hospital, Switzerland with Professor Hans Jakob Muller. She was CSIR Pool Officer and Research Associate in the Zoology Department, University of Delhi. In 1987, she started as a lecturer at Department of Genetics, University of Delhi South Campus. She has also been a visiting scientist at prestigious institutions abroad and has undertaken several international research collaborations. Thelma established the DNA-based diagnosis facilities for fragile X syndrome, the most common form of inherited intellectual disability, with financial support from Department of Biotechnology. Her lab is one of the few which offers this national level diagnostic service. She also served on various expert committees of ICMR, DBT, and CSIR. and as Member of the XV International Genetics Congress Trust. Thelma has worked on 197 publications as of Dec 2019 according to her google scholar page.

== Areas of specialization and interests ==
Thelma has extensively worked on human genetics and medical genomics. Her lab has conducted molecular genetic analysis of complex disorders in humans for Schizophrenia, Parkinson's disease, Rheumatoid arthritis, and Inflammatory bowel disorders. Thelma's group has researched the pharmacogenetics of commonly used antipsychotic, anti-Parkinsonian, and anti-rheumatoid drugs. Thelma identified new genes contributing to X-linked intellectual disability and Parkinson's disease. She has worked toward unraveling genome signatures with implication for diseases and functional genomics through genotype-phenotype correlations. In addition, she has worked toward diagnostic genetics for fragile X syndrome.

In 2025, Thelma sampled DNA from the indigenous population, the Kodava or Coorgis population, in Kodagu to determine that the Kodava population arose from three different ancestral genetic populations. This population has a distinct cultural practice and some physical attributes different from the majority population; understanding the origins of this population provides clues as to ancient human migrations. For her contributions in this area, she was named the 2025 Coorg Person of the Year.

== Awards and honours ==
Thelma has been recognised for her work. She has received many awards, some of her accomplishments are:

- Member of International Commission on the Clinical Use of Human Germline Genome Editing, Washington DC, USA, 2019
- The Sanghvi Oration Award, Indian Society of Human Genetics, 2015
- The Sunder Lal Hora Medal, Indian National Science Academy, 2014
- Stree Shakti Science Samman, 2012
- J.C. Bose Fellow, Department of Science & Technology, India, 2011-2021
- Member, Scientific Advisory Committee to Prime Minister, Govt. of India, 2009
- Fellow of Indian National Science Academy, India, Delhi, 2009
- Fellow of the Indian Academy of Sciences, Bangalore, 2006
- Fellow of National Academy of Sciences (India), Allahabad, 2003
- Fogarty International Research Career Award, 1997
- President and former Vice President of the Indian Society of Cell Biology, 2025.
