= Karnataka State Universities Act, 2000 =

Karnataka Legislative Assembly
- Long title: An Act to provide for the establishment, incorporation, regulation, and functioning of universities in Karnataka and matters connected therewith
- Citation: Karnataka Act No. 29 of 2000
- Considered by: Karnataka Legislative Assembly

Legislative history
- Bill title: Karnataka State Universities Bill, 2000
- Introduced by: Government of Karnataka
- Introduced: 2000

Related legislation
- University Grants Commission Act, 1956

Summary
- The Act governs the establishment, administration, and functioning of state universities in Karnataka, including their academic, financial, and administrative regulations.

Keywords
- Education, Universities, Karnataka, Higher Education
- Status: In force

The Karnataka State Universities Act, 2000 (Karnataka Act No. 29 of 2001) was an enactment passed by the Government of State of Karnataka, India.

== Description ==
The Act was first published in the Karnataka Gazette (Extraordinary) on 13 September 2001 to replace the then existing Karnataka State Universities Act, 1976. The Act was enacted with a view to increase the number of higher educational facilities in the state, and to create a common structure of administration over them.

== Amendments ==
- Amending Act 33 of 2003 - A Women's University at Bijapur was established from the academic year 2003–2004 to promote Higher Education among women in northern Karnataka.
- Amending Act 10 of 2004 - Tumkur University, which was carved out from Bangalore University, was established, with territorial jurisdiction over the districts of Tumkur, Kolar, Bangalore Rural (excluding Kanakapura and Hoskote Taluks) to reduce the unwieldy workload of the Bangalore University and to promote convenience of the students.
- Amending Act 2 of 2005 - Jurisdiction of Tumkur University restricted to Tumkur district.

== Structure ==
The act mandates that all state run universities have the following authorities as part of their structure.

1. Syndicate, whose powers include administering the finances, funds and properties, and the management of all substructures.
2. Academic Council, whose powers subject to the provisions of this Act, the Statutes, Ordinances and Regulations, have the control and general regulation of, and be responsible for the maintenance of, the standards of instruction, education and examination of the university.
3. Finance Committee, scrutinizes the accounts of the universities, and checks for financial mismanagement.
4. Board of Studies, functions decided by statutes.
5. Faculties, functions decided by statutes.
6. Planning, Monitoring and Evaluation Board, places resolutions before the academic council.

== Merits ==
- It allows for autonomous colleges to be affiliated to the university, though this is subject to regulations, political and bureaucratic procedures.
- Allows for transfer of employees between state universities.
- Uniform administrative structure across all state universities. It acts like a guideline for forming new universities and colleges.
- Explicitly stated are equal opportunity provisions for enrollment on basis of caste, disability, sex, race, class and background.

== Criticisms ==
- The requirement that colleges be affiliated is a notion that is still carried on. A college is required to be affiliated in order to exist and maintain standards and norms set by the university. The autonomy of the college is thereby impaired.
- It mandates a territorial jurisdiction of universities, thereby denying colleges to make a free choice as to which university they want to affiliate to.
- Independent senates of several universities were abolished. The new structure consists of positions of power held by state government officials, and those nominated directly or indirectly by government ministries or politicians.
- Authorities having more influence and power have more appointed officers and less academics.
- The act specifies seniority (number of years of employment) as a means of selecting professors rather than alternative means of evaluation.
- It prohibits those appointed to teach, to conduct private tuitions. Financing and Labour issues prevent the university or affiliated colleges from hiring the best available lecturer with higher remuneration. Prohibiting private tuitions only treated the issue symptomatically than by addressing the cause of decreasing quality.
- Research is considered to be the same as teaching in the sense of extended study. No administrative provisions exist to facilitate the research impact of a university, like laboratories, research centers, PhD student enrollment, graduate student enrollment, tenure process of a professor, research grants to professors.

Politically (legislature) appointed officials within the syndicate

Since the university is maintained and funded by the state government it is expected that officials of the state government executive manage the administrative affairs. The governor of the state is the Chancellor of the university, and include those nominated by the chancellor. However, the law makes it possible for the ruling state government legislature to also make appointments and thereby have political control.

- Six persons are nominated by the State Government legislature.

The others include two members nominated by the Chancellor, commissioner for collegiate education, director of technical education, one dean, two chancellor nominees, four principals.

The position of Pro-Chancellor is the current minister in charge of higher education of the legislature, and can act on behalf of the Chancellor if the Chancellor is absent.

Non-academic government (executive and legislature) appointed officials within the academic council

1. Commissioner for collegiate education or his nominee
2. Director of technical education or his nominee
3. One member of the Karnataka Legislative Assembly
4. Two members of the Karnataka Legislative Council
5. Three eminent persons representing industry nominated by the state government

The others include five professors, five deans and six students.
