= I Am Singh =

2011 Indian film by Puneet Issar

- Directed by: Puneet Issar
- Screenplay by: Puneet Issar; Satyajeet Puri; Deepali Issar
- Produced by: P.S. Thind
- Starring: Gulzar Inder Chahal; Rizwan Haider; Puneet Issar
- Edited by: Sanjay Verma
- Music by: Surinder Sodhi
- Release date: 2 December 2011
- Running time: 120 minutes
- Country: India
- Languages: Hindi; Punjabi

I Am Singh is a 2011 Indian action film which was released on 2 December 2011. The film stars Gulzar Inder Chahal, Rizwan Haider and Puneet Issar who also directed the film and wrote the screenplay. I Am Singh portrays the stories of Sikh immigrants in the US after the terrorist attacks of September 11, 2001. The film highlights what happened to the immigrants and their fight against prejudice, never losing faith in the American judicial system.

== Plot ==
Ranveer Singh is shocked when his younger brother living in the US is killed in a post-9/11 hate crime. He travels to Los Angeles to bring his brother's murderers to justice. There he meets former LAPD officer Fateh Singh and Pakistani American Rizwan Hyder who help him uncover the truth of what really happened.

== Cast ==
- Gulzar Inder Chahal as Ranveer Singh
- Rizwan Haider as Rizwan Hyder
- Amy Rasimas as Amy Washington
- Puneet Issar as Fateh Singh
- Brooke Johnston as Amelia White
- Tulip Joshi as Sara Hasan
- Mike Singh as Ajit Singh
- Yusuf Hussain as Hasan, Sara's father
- Neetha Mohindra as Simran Kaur, Ajit's wife
- Kavi Raz as Ranjit Singh, Ranveer's father
- Donny Kapoor as Veer Singh

== Soundtrack ==
1. "Dukalaang Praanasi" (Daler Mehndi) 6:55
2. "I Am Singh" (Daler Mehndi, Hard Kaur and Sukhwinder Singh) 6:45
3. "Dhol Wajda" (Mika Singh) 4:30
4. "Kya Jeena" (Rahat Fateh Ali Khan)
5. "Channd Paregge" (Sonu Kakkar, Sukhwinder Singh) 5:55
6. "Dil Naiyyo Lagda" (Gayatri Iyer) 5:40
7. "Doori Hai" (Rahat Fateh Ali Khan) 1:56
8. "Khanda Prithme Saajke" (Arvinder Singh) 3:28
9. "Turban Victory" (Kunal Ganjawala, Sukhwinder Singh) 4:09
10. "I Am Singh (Video Edit)" (Daler Mehndi) 3:55

== Reception ==
Taran Adarsh of Bollywood Hungama gave the film 1 out of 5 stars stating "The intent is right, but the written material isn't convincing, while the execution of the material is archaic, reminiscent of the cinema of the 80s, where over the top performances were considered 'acting'." Nikhat Kazmi of the Times of India gave the film 2.5 out of 5 stars, stating, "Puneet Issar does make a valiant effort to make a meaningful film about the aftermath of 9/11. Sadly, the effort gets bogged down by the hysterical undertones and the preachy nature of the film which ends up essentially as a documentary on Sikhism." John Anderson of Variety states, "A little late and more than a little goofy, "I Am Singh" splices a very serious subject—post-9/11 hate crimes against turban-wearing Sikhs—onto a Bollywood format, diluting a sobering message with hysterical dance numbers, engorged dialogue, bimbo-esque blondes and over-the-top performances."

== See also ==
- List of cultural references to the September 11 attacks
