= Acharya Bangalore Business School =

Business school in India

Acharya Bangalore B School
- Motto: Aspire. Accelerate. Achieve
- Type: Management and degree college
- Established: 2008
- Founder: B. Vijaypal Reddy
- Affiliations: Bangalore University, AICTE, UGC
- Chairman: B. Vijaypal Reddy
- Principal: Dr. Rajesh C
- Students: 2200+
- Location: Bengaluru, Karnataka, India; 13.00°N 77.48°E
- Campus: 5 acres (2.0 ha)
- Colors: White; Grey
- Nickname: ABBS
- Website: www.abbs.edu.in

Acharya Bangalore B School (ABBS) is a business school in India. The institute is located in Bengaluru and was founded in 2008 by B. Vijaypal Reddy who is also the current chairman of the institution. ABBS is a privately-held institution and is affiliated to Bangalore University. The institution is also approved by All India Council for Technical Education and is recognized by University Grants Commission. ABBS has academic partnership with multiple international universities including Daito Bunka University, Wenzhou University, St. Mary's University, Sunway University and Rennes School of Business. The institution is also an advanced signatory with United Nations-supported initiative The Principles for Responsible Management Education (PRME).

== History and accreditation ==
Acharya Bangalore B School, was established, in 2008, by B. Vijaypal Reddy. The institution is managed by Samagra Shikshana Samithi Trust, a not for profit organization based in Karnataka, India, in Bangalore. The institution imparts education in Management, Life sciences, Commerce, Computer science and Mass communication. The institution has student faculty ratio of 15:1. Acharya Bangalore B School has permanent affiliation with Bangalore University and is approved by Ministry of Human Resource Development as well as Government of Karnataka. The institution is accredited with Grade A by National Assessment and Accreditation Council with CGPA of 3.23/4.0 in its second cycle. ABBS is recognized by University Grants Commission (India) under the criteria 2f and 12b. Acharya Bangalore B School is also accredited by International Assembly for Collegiate Business Education. The institution is a member of Association of Management Development Institutions of South Asia (AMDISA), a SAARC body based in Hyderabad, India and is approved by All India Council for Technical Education. The MBA department of the institution is accredited by National Board of Accreditation. ABBS became member of CII in 2019.

In 2023, ABBS received NAAC A Grade for third time, receiving a CGPA of 3.6 in the curricular aspects category. In 2024, the institution attained autonomous status, which was granted by UGC for a period of ten years.

== Overview ==
=== ABBS Center for Research and Development (ACRD) ===
ABBS Center for Research and Development (ACRD) is a research center within the campus of Acharya Bangalore B School. The research center was established in 2008.

=== ABBS E-Cell ===
ABBS E-Cell was established in 2008. ABBS E-Cell is a non-profit entity, committed to encourage entrepreneurship among students of Acharya Bangalore B School. ABBS E-Cell was established with the support of National Entrepreneurship Network and Enactus and have supported in starting more than 20 startups since inception.

=== Rankings ===
In 2016, Acharya Bangalore B School was ranked among the Top 1% of the best B-schools in India. The institution is verified as a Global League Institute (2014-2016) as a Great Place To Study and Research Institute, London. In December 2017, ABBS was ranked with 40th Best B-Schools in the B-School survey by Business India. Acharya Bangalore B School has been ranked 21st best B-School in India by Careers360. The institution is also listed among the top 6 private business schools in Bangalore by Businessworld.

==== 2019 ====
By the end of 2019, ABBS was ranked as follows:-

- 13th Best B-School, South Zone, Times B-School Survey 2019.
- 5th Top B-School of Eminence, CSR-GHRDC B-School Survey 2019.
- 9th Best B-School in Karnataka, CSR-GHRDC B-School Survey 2019.

2020

- 10th Best B-School, South Zone, Times B-School Survey 2020.

2021

- 33rd Top Private B-School in India, Times B-School Survey 2021.
- 45th Top B-School in India, Times B-School Survey 2021.

2024

- 34th Best Private B-School in India, Education World.

== ABBS Management Business and Entrepreneurship Review (AMBER) ==
ABBS Management Business and Entrepreneurship Review, commonly known as AMBER, is a peer-reviewed academic journal published by Acharya Business B School. The journal is published biannually and catalogues original research papers from academic, social and corporate sectors.

== TEDxABBS ==
ABBS hosted its first TED event in January 2019 with various speakers from different fields. The institution hosted TEDxABBSWomen in December 2019 with the theme Bold + Brilliant.

== AURA 2024 ==
In March 2024, ABBS hosted AURA 2024 event to showcase business plan ideas presented by graduating students to top industry leaders and category experts.
