= The Oxford College of Science =

- Type: Private
- Established: 1994
- Academic affiliations: Bangalore University
- Principal: R. Kavyashree
- Location: Bangalore, Karnataka, India; 12°54′57″N 77°38′34″E
- Website: www.theoxford.edu/college_of_science/index.htm

The Oxford College of Science is a science college located in Bangalore, India under The Oxford Educational Institutions. The Oxford College of science is accredited with "A" Grade by the National Assessment and Accreditation Council of India in 2011 and 2017.

== History ==
The Oxford College of Science was started in the year 1994 with twelve students and five teachers. In 2024, the college had 3000 students.

The Oxford College of Science was ranked first among private colleges in Karnataka by India Today for three consecutive years (2007, 2008 and 2009) and was ranked 25th amongst science colleges in India in 2011. In 2024, it was ranked at number 55 across India.
