= Superman (1987 film) =

1987 superhero film directed by B. Gupta

- Directed by: B. Gupta
- Written by: B. Gupta
- Based on: Superman by: Mario Puzo; David Newman; Leslie Newman; Robert Benton; Richard Donner
- Produced by: B. Gupta
- Starring: Puneet Issar; Preeti Ganguli; Bob Christo; Sonia Sahni; Ranjeeta Kaur; Urmila Bhatt; Dharmendra
- Edited by: Gyan Shiv
- Music by: Kamalkant
- Production company: Fine Art Pictures
- Release date: 29 May 1987 (India)
- Running time: 123 minutes
- Country: India
- Language: Hindi

Superman is a 1987 Indian Hindi-language superhero film produced and directed by B. Gupta. The film stars Dharmendra, Puneet Issar, Sonia Sahni and Ranjeeta Kaur. Issar plays the role of Superman. It is the unofficial Indian adaptation of 1978 American film Superman.

== Cast ==
- Puneet Issar as Shekhar / Superman
- Sonia Sahni as Editor
- Dharmendra as Jor-El, Superman's Biological Father
- Ranjeeta Kaur as Lara-El, Superman's Biological Mother
- Ashok Kumar as Jonathan Kent, Superman's Foster Father
- Birbal as Birbal Chamcha
- Bob Christo as Bob
- Preeti Ganguli as Woman from Zambia
- Rajan Haksar as Goga
- Dinesh Hingoo as Rustom
- Jagdeep
- Jankidas
- Shakti Kapoor as Verma
- Lalita Kumari as Mrs. Jankidas
- Guddi Maruti as Guddi Jhunjhunwali
- Murad as Chief of the other planet

== Soundtrack ==
1. "Kankari Jhade Paon Mein" - Anuradha Paudwal
2. "Maine Maana Tumhi Ho" - Anuradha Paudwal
3. "Puchho Na Kya Mujhe" - Chandrani Mukherjee
4. "Tujhe Paani Pila Ke Maarenge" - Chandrani Mukherjee, Shabbir Kumar
5. "Raat Ho To Aisi Ho Mastani" - Alka Yagnik

== See also ==
- List of Indian superhero films
- Superman in film
