= Raj Manhas =

- Born: April 15, 1948 (age 78); Paldi, Punjab, India
- Education: Punjab Engineering College(B.S.); University of Washington (Master of Engineering)
- Occupation: Educator
- Spouse: Inderjit (Rana) Kaur Manhas (1978–present)
- Children: Amitoz; Simran

Rajinder (Raj) Singh Manhas was the first Asian-American and the 17th Superintendent of Seattle Public Schools (2003-2007). He also served as the Superintendent of North Thurston Public Schools, Lacey, Washington (2009-2016). During 2008 he was executive director of Seeds of Compassion, a public event hosting the Dalai Lama held in Seattle to promote compassion in early childhood development and in communities. Prior to his work in the field of education, he held executive level positions with the City of Seattle and Rainier Bank/Security Pacific Bank.

== Family and education ==
Rajinder (Raj) Singh Manhas was born on April 15, 1948, in Paldi, Punjab, India, one of seven children of Daljit Kaur Manhas and Jaswant Singh Manhas. In August, 1947, due to the division of British India, his Sikh farming family were displaced from their land and home in a village named “Chak 14/66” near Syedwala, in the newly proclaimed country of Pakistan. Migrating as refugees to India, the Manhas family settled in a village named Saroya, a village in the Himalayan foothills of northern India, near Garhshanker, in the Punjab region. He spent his early grade school years in his birthplace Paldi, and then graduated from Government High School, Saroya, with distinction and at the top of his class. He completed his pre-engineering at Lyallpur Khalsa College, Jallandar, Punjab, and a degree in aeronautical engineering from Punjab Engineering College, Chandigarh, India. He completed a two-year research and teaching assignment at the same college, and then moved to the United States to complete a master's degree in Industrial Engineering at the University of Washington with a business focus in June 1975. His first job after graduation was at Rainier National Bank (later Security Pacific Bank) in a management consulting role. Later he held various leadership positions at that bank, including his final position as regional manager for internal operations for four states.

== Educational leadership ==
In October 2003, Raj Manhas was formally hired as Superintendent by the School Board in Seattle, WA. Manhas had served as Interim Superintendent since June 2003, when the School Board had asked him to replace previous superintendent Joseph Olchefske who had resigned following the disclosure of an audit detailing weaknesses in financial management at the district that led to a $34 million budget shortfall over two years. Previous to becoming Superintendent, Manhas had served as Chief Operating Officer for Seattle Public Schools, starting in October, 2001. Over the next four years, Manhas led the School District in facing a series of administrative and financial challenges. He was credited with closing the budget shortfall, balancing the District's annual budget, and returning the District to financial health with $20 million in reserves, as well as focusing the district on what he called "child-centered education." However, his administration was also marked by controversy over plans to close a number of neighborhood schools due to declining enrollment along with rising costs for educating students. He announced his resignation as superintendent in October 2006 and ended his term in June, 2007.

In April 2008, Manhas served as executive director of Seeds of Compassion, a series of events over four days when the Dalai Lama, Archbishop Desmond Tutu, and other influential thinkers including well known brain and social scientists came together for an unprecedented five-day gathering in Seattle to engage the community in an in-depth conversation on compassion. 150,000 attended various events organized by Seeds of Compassion, and 44 million interacted with the Seeds of Compassion online broadcast.

In June 2009, Manhas became Superintendent of North Thurston Public Schools, a school district that provides educational services for Lacey and parts of unincorporated Thurston County, Washington, including students from the Nisqually Tribe Reservation and nearby Joint Base Lewis-McChord. North Thurston is the 23rd largest school district in the state of Washington, with more than 14,000 students. In an interview with the Olympian newspaper at the beginning of his new job, Manhas announced that "one of his goals for the district, besides academic improvement, is to foster a school system that helps students develop socially and emotionally." Over the next seven years, Manhas led the District to improve student academic performance and test scores while persuading local voters to approve a 20-year, $175 million bond measure to remodel five schools and build a new middle school. Manhas retired as Superintendent in June 2016.
