= Subhashni Raj =

- Born: 1986 (age 38–39); Suva, Fiji
- Occupation(s): Advocacy of environmental issues such as climate change and also food systems
- Known for: Climate movement in the Pacific Island countries

Subhashni Raj (born 1986) is a Fijian activist on environmental issues such as climate change, and also related food systems. After her doctoral studies in Urban and Regional Planning at the University at Buffalo, New York as a Kauffman Fellow, she has been active in the Climate movement in the Pacific Island countries raising funds for pursuing her initiatives. Her objective is to create a "sustainable future for her native Fiji through climate action planning".

== Biography ==
Subhashni Raj was born in Suva, Fiji in 1986. She studied in the Bangalore University in India and obtained a degree in microbiology, chemistry and zoology. She also obtained a Post Graduate Diploma from TERI University in India in Programme-Sustainable Development Practices in Public Policy. On her return from Bangalore to Suva, she joined the 350.org, a global entity involved with people's action initiatives on climate change. She worked as a Project Technical Assistant at the Secretariat of the Pacific Community (SPC), Pacific Island countries. In 2009, she participated, as an environmental activist volunteer, in the peaceful protests held in Copenhagen at the venue where United Nations Climate Talks were being held. Representing the 350.org, she pursued actions related to subjects of Integrated Water Resources Management (IWRM) and water governance, apart from "climate advocacy" and took part representing the Pacific Islands countries during several deliberations on climate. She then pursued her studies in Urban and Regional Planning at the University at Buffalo, New York as a Fulbright scholar and obtained a master's degree in Masters in Urban and Regional Planning, in 2011. Concurrently with her studies, as an environmental activist who had mobilized many a protests in Pacific rim for the cause of environment, she went to Washington, D.C. to join a protest march against the Keystone XL pipeline project. Around 12,000 people participated in this protest which was called the "Tar Sands Action rally". Held in fall 2012 close to the White House, the protest demanded action by the Barack Obama administration not to entertain the permit application for the pipeline, as such a project would be detrimental to the aquifer in the Nebraska Sandhills. On her participation in these protests she was vocal in saying: "In what seemed like United States showing leadership for the first time on issues related to climate action? Of course I needed to be there. If we win this, then it’s history in the making, and for the first time we’ll be on the winning side."

Earlier, in 2009 Raj had participated in an environmental leadership development program of the U.S. State Department held to "foster environmental stewardship around the globe", in Hawaii where she was disturbed by the extent of the effect of invasive vegetation, rising sea level and erosion of the coastline that took place there. This influenced her future course of action for her country.

Raj continued her studies at the University at Buffalo for her doctoral degree in Urban and Regional Planning under the Jerome L. Kaufman Doctoral Fellowship in Food Systems Planning, the first of its kind. Her research work covered Climate Change and Food Systems and the effect of the latter on climate change, with emphasis on "food sovereignty" and related legal aspects.

Raj has assumed a leadership role with 350.org Pacific, in getting funding to train young environmental leaders and supporting citizen action on climate change across the vulnerable Pacific Islands.

== Sources ==
- Hunter, Emily (1 April 2011). The Next Eco-Warriors: 22 Young Women and Men Who Are Saving the Planet. Conari Press. ISBN 978-1-60925-336-3.
