= Bangalore University =

State university in Bangalore, Karnataka, India

- Motto: Gyanam, Vignana Sahitam
- Motto in English: Knowledge along with Wisdom
- Type: Public
- Established: 1964; 62 years ago
- Affiliations: UGC, NAAC, AIU, ACU, DEC
- Chancellor: Governor of Karnataka
- Vice-Chancellor: C. Shivaraju
- Academic staff: 755
- Students: 8,535
- Undergraduates: 2,843
- Postgraduates: 4,133
- Doctoral students: 1,128
- Location: Bengaluru, Karnataka, India; 12°56′19.59″N 77°30′11.45″E
- Campus: Urban
- Website: bangaloreuniversity.ac.in

Bangalore University (BU) is a collegiate public state university in Bengaluru, Karnataka, India. The university is a part of the Association of Indian Universities (AIU), Association of Commonwealth Universities (ACU) and affiliated by University Grants Commission (UGC). Bangalore University is accredited by the NAAC with grade A++ in 2023. Bangalore University was trifurcated into Dr. Manmohan Singh Bengaluru City University and Bengaluru North University. It has its jurisdiction over Bengaluru Urban and Bengaluru Rural districts.

== Academics ==
The university is structured into six faculties- Arts, Science, Commerce & Management, Education, Law and Engineering. It has 43 Post Graduate Departments, a Postgraduate Centre at Kolar, (Started during 1994–95), three constituent colleges, 665 affiliated colleges (of which 115 have PG Courses) and several other Centres and Directorates of higher learning and research under its purview. At present, the university offers 50 Post Graduate Courses and employment-oriented diploma and certificate courses. The university has launched the five-year Integrated Courses in Biological Sciences, Social Sciences, Earth and Atmospheric Sciences and Business Studies and four-year B.S. programme.

== Organisation and administration ==
=== Governance ===
C. Shivaraju is the current Vice Chancellor appointed on 12 July 2026. Cynthia Menezes Prabhu was the temporary Vice-Chancellor during June – July 2022. Venugopal K. R. was appointed as the Vice-Chancellor of Bangalore University on 12 June 2018 and his tenure ended on 10 June 2022. Venugopal K. R., UVCE Alumni, Principal UVCE was the Special Officer to the Government of Karnataka for Trifurcating Bangalore University. He submitted the report on 26 March 2015 for restructuring Bangalore University into Bangalore University, Bengaluru City University and Bengaluru North University and UVCE to be carved out as Center of Excellence on the model of Indian Institute of Technology. Former Vice-Chancellor (VC) was Prabhu Dev. He resigned on 13 October 2012 to accept the Karnataka government's offer of chairmanship of the Karnataka Health System Commission. H.N. Ramesh was appointed as VC temporarily till new VC is appointed by the state

With more than 650 affiliated colleges, the Karnataka government has decided to bifurcate, or 'carve out a new university' to ease management. To this effect, the state government had appointed two study groups. One group was headed by former Gulbarga University Vice-Chancellor N Rudraiah and another was a group formed by the Karnataka State Higher Education Council. The Rudraiah study suggested trifurcation of the university, while the Council suggested bifurcation.

=== Constituent Colleges ===
- University Law College
- University College of Physical Education

== Erstwhile UVCE ==
The Erstwhile University Visvesvaraya College of Engineering, was the University College of Engineering of the University of Mysore from 1917 to 1964, and of the Bangalore University from 1964 to 2021. It is now a separate Public State University of Visvesvaraya College of Engineering.

=== Affiliated colleges ===
Bangalore University lists 70 government colleges, 52 aided colleges and 11 unaided colleges. Affiliated colleges include:

- Acharya Bangalore Business School
- Acharya Institute of Management and Sciences
- Bangalore Management Academy
- Government First Grade College, Malleshwaram
- Smt. VHD Central Institute of Home Science
- Oxford College of Sciences
- St. Claret College, Bangalore
- Surana College, Bangalore
- Government Arts College, Ambedkar Veedhi
- Regional College of Management Bangalore

=== Ranking ===
University and college rankings

General – international
- QS (Asia) (2023): 551-600

The NIRF ranked it 98th overall and 64th among universities in the 2022 rankings, but it has not appeared in the 2023 rankings.

The QS World University Rankings ranked Bangalore University 551–600 in Asia in 2023.

=== Distinctions ===
In 2001, the university was accredited by NAAC and received Five Star Status. In 2016, The university then once again was reaccredited with an A grade under the new grading system.

In a first, the university in 2010 announced admissions for transgender people by reserving one seat in each PG course. Now, the university's admission forms feature a third category of gender, namely 'Others'.

== Notable alumni ==
- Venugopal K R, former Vice-chancellor of Bangalore University.
- Priya Balasubramaniam, Vice President of Operations at Apple Inc.
- Sri Sri Ravi Shankar
- Arun Pudur
- Kiran Mazumdar-Shaw
- B K Thelma
- Anushka Sharma
- Sir M. Visvesvaraya
- C. N. R. Rao, Bharat Ratna
- Anushka Shetty
- Rahul Dravid
- C. Rajagopalachari
- Anil Kumble
- A. S. Kiran Kumar
- Nirupama Rao
- Subhashni Raj
- Nape Nnauye

== See also ==
- List of universities in India
- Universities and colleges in India
- Education in India
- Distance Education Council
- University Grants Commission (India)
- Bangalore University Task Force
