= List of Punjabi films before 2000 =

This is a list of Punjabi films before 2000.

== 1930s ==
K.D. Mehra made the first Punjabi "talkie" film, Sheela, also known as Pind Di Kurhi, in 1935. Young Noor Jehan was introduced as an actress and singer in this film. Sheila was made in the city of Calcutta (now Kolkata) and released in Lahore. It ran very successfully and was a hit across the province. Due to the success of this film more producers started making Punjabi films.

Notable Punjabi film of the 1930s:

- Pind Di Kurhi (1930) – the first Punjabi film with synchronized sound

Title	Director	Cast	Production house
1935
Pind Di Kurhi	K.D. Mehra	Balo, Shamshad Begum, M. Ismail, Noor Jehan, Eidden, P.N Bally, J.N Dar Kashmiri, A.Rahman Kashmiri, R.P Kapoor, Haider Bandi	Indira Movie Tone
1938
Heer Sial	K.D. Mehra	Noor Jehan, Mubarak, Pushpa Rani, Haidar Bandi, Eidan Bai	Indira Movie Tone

== 1940s ==
Title	Director	Cast	Notes
1940
Mera Punjab	Krishna Dev Mehra	Haider Bandi	
1948
Chaman	Roop K. Shorey	Meena Shorey, Karan Dewan, Kuldip Kaur, Om Prakash, Majnu, Gulab	Chaman was the first Panjabi film released in East Panjab following the Partition of Panjab.
1949
Lachhi	Ravindra Dave	Wasti, Manorama, Majnu, Sophia, Baij Sharma, Om Prakash	
Mundri	Daud Chand	Ragni, Noor Mohammed Charlie, Rani Kiran, Sheikh Iqbal, Ilyas Kashmiri, Ghulam Mohammed	Pakistan's largest film company Evernew Pictures, owned by Agha G. A. Gul released its first Punjabi language film
Pheray	Nazir	Sawarn Lata, Nazir, M. Ismael, Nazar, Zeenat Begum, Maya Devi, Baba Alam Siaposh	

== 1950s ==
Title	Director	Cast	Notes
1950
Bhaiya Ji	Om Prakash	Om Prakash, Suresh, shyama	
Posti	K.D. Mehra	Shyama, Manorama, Amarnath, Randhir, Majnu, Ramesh Thakur, Bhag Singh, Chand Burque, Moti Sood Majnu	
Madari	Rajendra Sharma	Kuldip Kaur, Om Prakash, Madan Puri, Meena Shorey, Suresh	
Chhai	Shankar Mehta	Sunder, Geeta Bali, Pran, Jeevan, Kuldip Kaur, Khairati, Majnu, (Ram Avtar as a Lala baksha laadu)	
Baalo	Kuldeep	Geeta Bali	
Beli	Masud Pervaiz	M. Ismail, Santosh Kumar, Sabiha Khanum, Shahina	
Gabhroo	Anwar Kamal Pasha	Shamim Bano, Santosh Kumar, Allauddin	
Laaray	Nazir	Sawarn Lata, Nazir, Nazar, Allauddin, Baba Alam Siaposh	
Shammi	Munshi Dil	Shammi, Santosh Kumar, Ajmal, Shola	
1951
Mutiyar			
Baisakhi	Rajender Sharma		
Phooman	Kuldeep		
Billo	Amjad Hussain	Najma, Darpan, M. Ismail	Debut film for film playback singer Zubaida Khanum
Chann Way	Madam Noor Jehan	Noor Jehan, Santosh Kumar, Jahangir, Yasmin, Ghulam Mohammed, Sultan Khost, Hamalia Wala and Salim Raza	Noor Jehan started her film career in Pakistan as actress, singer and director
Dilbar	Anwar Kamal Pasha	Najma, Darpan, M. Ismael	
1952
Kaude Shah	Shanti Prakash Bakshi	Daljit, Miss Manju, Rajni, Th. Ramesh Nagpal, Jaswant, Mohan, Chand Burqe	
Jugni	Rajendra Sharma	Majnu, Roopmala, Sunder, Ramesh Thakur	
Lara Lappa	M.S. Dar	Ilyas Kashmiri, Sabiha Khanum, Santosh Kumar	
Nath	Shafi Ejaz	Hafeez Jehan, Haseeb, Talish	Talish's debut film.
1953
Shehri Babu	Nazir	Sawarn Lata, Santosh Kumar, Nazar, M. Ismael, Allauddin, Zubaida Khanum and Inayat Hussain Bhatti	Film was released on 13 June 1953
1954
Ashtali	Shanti Prakash Bakshi	Daljit	
Shah Ji	S.Arora	Roopmala	
Vanjara	Shaminder Chahal	Amarnath, Chand Burke, Kamaldeep, Majnu, Sunder, Ramesh Thakur	
Chann Mahi	Anwar Kamal	Bahar Begum, M. Ismail, Asif Jah, Aslam Pervaiz, Nighat Sultana, Gul Zaman	
1955
Bulbul	Daud Chand	Asha Posley, Sudhir, Nazar, Zeenat Begum	
Heer	Nazir	Sawarn Lata, Inayat Hussain Bhatti, Zeenat Begum, Nazar, Rekha, Imdad and Ajmal	
Patay Khan	M. A. Rasheed	Noor Jehan, Aslam Pervaiz, Zubaida Khanum, Zarif, Musarrat Nazir, Nazar, M. Ismael, Imdad Hussain, Hazin Qadri, Rekha, Allauddin	
Pattan	Luqman	Musarrat Nazir, Santosh Kumar, Asha Posley, Nazar, Ajmal, M. Ismael, Ghulam Mohammed, Sultan Khoost, Diljeet Mirza and Allauddin	
1956
Chann Mahi	Anwar Kamal Pasha	Bahar, Aslam Pervaiz, Asif Jah, Rekha, Sheikh Iqbal, Gulraiz	
Dulla Bhatti	M. S. Daar	Sabiha Khanum, Sudhir, Asha Posley, Asif Jah, Ghulam Mohammed, Sheikh Iqbal	
Guddi Gudda	Wali Sahib	Musarrat Nazir, Sudhir, Talish	
Jabroo	Muzaffar Tahir	Yasmin, Akmal Khan, Talish	
Mahi Munda	M.J. Rana	Musarrat Nazir, Sudhir, Ajmal, Zarif, Nazar, Ilyas Kashmiri	
Morni	Shakoor Qadri	Yasmin, Inayat Hussain Bhatti, Nazar	
Peengaan	Amin Malik	Musarrat Nazir, Aslam Pervaiz, Allauddin	
1957
Hulare	O.P. Dutta		
Muklawa	Rajinder Sharma	Om Prakash	
Bholay Khan	Jamil Mirza	Sabiha Khanum, Aslam Pervaiz, Neelo, Diljeet Mirza	
Nooran	M.M. Billoo Mehra	Noor Jehan, Sudhir, Zeenat, Nazar, Ajmal, Maya Devi, Agha Salim Raza	
Palkan	Amin Malik	Musarrat Nazir, Akmal Khan, Allauddin, Zarif	
Sehti	M.J. Rana	Musarrat Nazir, Akmal Khan, Neelo, Talish	
Yakke Wali	M. J. Rana	Musarrat Nazir, Sudhir, Neelo, Zeenat Begum, Ajmal, Ilyas Kashmiri, Rekha, Ghulam Mohammed, Iqbal Kashmiri, Zarif	
Zulfaan	Agha Hussaini	Bahar, Aslam Pervaiz, Zeenat Begum	
Pingan			
1958
Nikki	Bina Khosla		
Choomantar	M. M. Billoo Mehra	Noor Jehan, Aslam Pervaiz, Laila, Zarif, Salim Raza, Allauddin	
Ghar Jawai	M. Akram	Bahar, Sultan Rahi, A. Shah Shikarpuri, Asif Jah	
Jagga		Meena Shorey, Aslam Pervaiz, Ilyas Kashmiri	
Jatti	M. J. Rana	Musarrat Nazir, Sudhir, Neelo, Rangeela	
Katchian Kalian	Amin Malik	Neelo, Aslam Pervaiz, Zarif, Ajmal	
Mukhra	Jafar Malik	Sabiha Khanum, Santosh Kumar, Asha Posley, Nazar, Ghulam Mohammed, Allauddin	
Shiekh Chilli	Asif Jah	Sabiha Khanum, Aslam Pervaiz, Asif Jah	
1959
Bhangrha	Jugal Kishore	Nishi, Sunder, Khariti, Vimla, Satish, Ramlal & Majnu	
Pardesi Dhola	S.P Bakshi	B.M Vyas, Chand Burqie, Chaman Puri, Khairati, Jeevan, Tuntun	
Bachha Jamoora	Aslam Irani	Meena Shorey, Akmal Khan, Nayyar Sultana, Mazhar Shah, Allauddin, Zarif, Ilyas Kashmiri, Ajmal	
Bodi Shah	Qalander Ahmad	Bahar, Akmal Khan, Zarif	
Jaidad	Riaz Ahmad Raju	Musarrat Nazir, Aslam Pervaiz, Shamim Ara, Allauddin	
Kartar Singh	Saifuddin Saif	Musarrat Nazir, Sudhir, Bahar, Laila, Inayat Hussain Bhatti, Ajmal, Ghulam Muhammad, Fazal Haq, Zarif and Allauddin	
Lukkan Mitti	Wali Sahib	Musarrat Nazir, Aslam Pervaiz, Neelo, Zarif	
Naaji	Sabiha Khanum	Sabiha Khanum, Santosh Kumar	
Pardesan	M. Naseem	Noor Jehan, Aslam Pervaiz, Asha Posley, Zarif	
Suchche Moti	Sheikh Iqbal	Neelo, Ejaz Durrani, Talish	
Yaar Beli	Khalil Qaiser	Musarrat Nazir, Sudhir, Neelo, Zarif	

== 1960s ==
Title	Director	Cast	Genre	Notes
1960
Chaudhary Karnail Singh	Krishan Kumar	Jagdish Sethi, Prem Chopra, Madan Puri, Krishna Kumari, Vimla, Sunder, Jabeen Jalil, Rani Sachdeva	Action, Comedy, Crime	IMDb
Do Lachhiyan	Jugal Kishore	Daljeet, Indira, Krishna Kumari, Kharaiti, Satish, Sunder, Rajnath, Shamlal, Mansaram, Jagdish Kamal, Polson, R. P. Sharma, Jeet Kapoor	Drama, Romance	IMDb
Heer Syal	H.S Kwatra	Amarnath, Naina, Pachhi, Indira, Sant Ram	Romance	Music by Sardul Singh Kwatra. Film based on Punjabi epic love story Heer RanjhaIMDb,
Kiklee	Bekal Amritsari	Jagdish Sethi, Madan Puri, Tun Tun, Indira, Madhumati, Gopal Sehgal		IMDb
Behrupia	Aslam Irani	Meena Shorey, Akmal Khan, Zarif, Mazhar Shah, Ajmal	Comedy	Music by Tufail Farooqi.
Mitti Dian Murtaan	Riaz Ahmad Raju	Bahar Begum, Aslam Pervaiz, Zarif, Nazar	Drama	The film was released on 21 October 1960.Music by Ghulam Ahmed Chishti with one super-hit film song related to the film title .
Rani Khan	M. J. Rana	Husna, Akmal Khan, Nazar, Zarif	Drama	Noor Jehan started her solo career as a Punjabi playback singer in this film. The film was released on 4 November 1960.
Sohni Kumharan	Wali Sahib	Bahar, Aslam Pervaiz, Zarif, Ajmal	Romance	Film based on Punjabi epic love story Sohni Mahiwal. Music by Hassan Latif Lilak and film song lyrics by Hazin Qadri.
1961
Billo	Shankar Mehta	I. S. Johar, Indira Billi, Achala Sachdev, Diljeet, Nishi, Wasti, Kharaiti	Drama	IMDb
Ek Ladki Saat Ladke	Roop K. Shorey	Ravindra Kapoor, Ameena, Durga Khote		
Valait Pass	Ved Madan	Shyama, Johnny Walker		
Guddi	Jugal Kishore	Madan Puri, Diljeet, Nishi, Wasti		IMDb
Jija Ji	Baldev R Jhingan	Nishi, Karan Dewan, Gulshan Bawra, Achala Sachdev, Sunder, Uma Devi, Tun Tun, V. Gopal	Drama	IMDb, YouTube
Jatti		Indira, Shiv Kumar	Drama	IMDb, YouTube
Aabroo	Sheikh Abdul Rehman	Bahar, Akmal Khan, Rekha, Ghulam Mohammed, Sikkedar, Ilyas Kashmiri	Romance; Drama	PunjabiMusic by Ghulam Ahmed Chishti, film song lyrics by Sikkedar and Tufail Hoshiarpuri .One super-hit film song sung by Nahid Niazi.
Dandian		Yasmin, Aslam Pervaiz, Munawar Zarif	Comedy	Debut film for Munawar Zarif.
Mangti		Bahar, Aslam Pervaiz	Drama	
Muftbar	Aslam Irani	Musarrat Nazir, Akmal Khan, Zarif, A. Shah Shikarpuri	Romance; Comedy	Music by Tufail Farooqi.
1962
Khedan De Din Char	Jugal Kishore, Manohar Deepak	Manohar Deepak, Indira Billi, Gopal Sehgal, Wasti, Jagdev, Rajnath		IMDb
Banto	Baldev R Jhingan	Ashok Kumar, Pradeep Kumar, Nishi, Achla Sachdev	Drama	IMDb, YouTube
Dhol Jani	Rajesh Nanda	Nishi, Sudesh, Sunder, Khrati, Gopal Sahgel, Amul Sen	Drama	
Pardesi Dhola	S.P Bakshi	B. M. Vyas, Chand Burqie, Chaman Puri, Khairati, Jeevan, Tun Tun	Drama	IMDb
Billo Jee	M. Ejaz	Sawarn Lata, Habib, Nazir	Romance	
Chouhdry	Muzaffar Tahir	Naghma, Akmal Khan, Asif Jah	Drama	
Jamalo	M. J. Rana	Meena Shorey, Asad Bokhari, Naghma	Romance	
Paharan	Farrukh Bokhari	Yasmin, Yousuf Khan, Talish	Romance	
1963
Lado Rani	S. Niranjan	Suresh, Indira Billi, Helen, Wasti, K.N. Singh, Shammi, Tun Tun, Gopal Sehgal, Raj Rani, Ram Avtar, Jagdish Kanwal, Mauji, Mirza Musharraf		
Mere Haniyan	Prem Mehra	Indira Billi, Ravindra Kapoor		
Pind Di Kudi	Baldev R. Jhingan	Nishi, Ravindra Kapoor, Khairati, Maruti, Wasti, Tun Tun		YouTube
Laajo	Jugal Kishore	Nishi, Daljeet, Ram Mohan, Majnu, Khairati, Gopal Saigal, Menna Rai, (Harbans Bhape as Qawal)		IMDb
Aeh Dharti Punjab Di	Satyajit Pal	Prem Chopra, Jabeen Jalil, Nimmi, Madan Puri	Drama	IMDb
Sapni	Baldev R. Jhingan	Prem Chopra, Hiralal, Khairati, W.M. Khan, Madhumati, Nishi, Gopal Saigal, Tun Tun	Drama	IMDb
Chacha Khamkha		Laila, Sudhir, Mazhar Shah	Comedy film	
Choorian	Amin Malik	Laila, Akmal Khan, Mazhar Shah, Saeed Khan, Rangeela	Drama	This super-hit film was released on 17 May 1963.Music by Tufail Farooqi and film song lyrics by Baba Alam Siaposh.It was a Golden Jubilee film of 1963.
Mehndi Wale Hath	S. Suleman	Zeba, Sultan Rahi, Nazar, Talish	Drama	
Mouj Mela	Aslam Irani	Neelo, Habib, Rani	Romance	The film was released on 26 February 1963.It was a Golden Jubilee film of 1963.
Rishta	N.E. Akhtar	Sabiha, Santosh, Rangeela	Drama	Music by Ghulam Ahmed Chishti.This was debut film for playback singer Masood Rana
Tees Mar Khan	Haidar Choudhary	Shirin, Allauddin, Zeenat Begum, Asif Jah	Drama	The film was released on 30 August 1963.Debut film for the music team of Manzoor Ashraf.
1964
Bharjai	Haider Chaudhry	Ajmal, Akmal, Bahar Begum, Asad Bukhari, Nasreen, Zahoor Shah, Shirin		IMDb
Jagga	Jugal Kishore	Amarnath, Mumtaz Begum, Indira, Jugal Kishore, Harbans Bhape,Dara Singh, Saudagar Singh, Tiger Joginder Singh		IMDb
Sat Saliyan	Karunesh Thakur, story by Daljit	Indira, Ravindra Kapoor, Gopal Sehgal, Majnu, Indira Bansal, Swarn Dada, Raj Rani	Drama	Music by S.Madan, Lyrics Naqsh Lyallpuri
Main Jatti Punjab Di	Baldev S. Jhingan	Prem Nath, Kharati, Lata Arora, Jeevan, Nishi, Madan Puri, Achala Sachdev, Tun Tun	Romance	IMDb
Geet Baharan De movie under baner (Akashbani Pictures)	Henry Julius	Manohar Deepak, Jabeen Jalil, Music by Dattaram Wadkar	Drama	
Mama Ji	Roshanlal Bhardwaj	Bela Bose, Mohan Choti, Indira Billi, Mehmood, Gopal Saigal	Comedy	IMDb
Satluj De Kande	M. Billoo Mehra	Balraj Sahni, Mirza Musharraf, Nishi, Suresh	Drama	IMDb
Bharjai	Haider Chaudhry	Bahar, Akmal Khan, Zahoor Shah, Asif Jah, Ajmal, Sawan	Drama	This film did an 'average' business at the box-office, music by Manzoor Ashraf
Daachi	Aslam Irani	Neelo, Sudhir, Naghma, A. Shah, Nazar, Munawar Zarif	Musical, Drama	The story of film was about a strange camel and a corrupt adviser, film was released on 15 February 1964. It was a landmark movie for playback singer Masood Rana. He first shot to fame after a mega-hit film song in this movie.Superb music by Ghulam Ahmed Chishti.
Ek Perdesi Ek Mutiyar	Luqman	Naghma, Asad Bokhari, Allauddin, Asif Jah	Romance	Music by Salim Iqbal
Hath Jori	Aslam Irani	Naghma, Akmal Khan, Razia, Munawar Zarif, Rangeela	Drama	The film was released on 4 December 1964.Another Golden Jubilee film by Ghulam Ahmed Chishti and film song lyrics by Hazeen Qadri.
Jugni	Shafi Ejaz	Neelo, Yousuf Khan, M. Ismael	Romance	
Laadli	Haider Chaudhry	Nasira, Akmal Khan, Zeenat Begum	Romance	
Lai Lug	Khawaja Mohiuddin	Firdous, Ejaz Durrani, Allauddin	Comedy; Drama	Super-hit music by Master Inayat Hussain.
Malang	A. Hameed	Firdous, Allauddin, Sawan	Drama	
Mama Jee	Amin Malik	Laila, Sudhir, Habib, Talish		
Mera Mahi	M. J. Rana	Neelo, Akmal Khan, Nazar, Asad Bokhari, Zeenat Begum	Romance	Another musical hit by music director Ghulam Ahmed Chishti.
Sher Di Bachi	Jafar Bokhari	Neelo, Mohammad Ali, M. Ismael	Drama	
Pani	Jafar Bokhari	Shirin, Akmal Khan, Mazhar Shah	Drama	
Walait Pass	Muzaffar Tahir	Shirin, Akmal Khan, Asif Jah, Zeenat Begum	Comedy, Romance	Music by Ashiq Hussain
Waris Shah	Saeed Ashrafi	Bahar, Akmal Khan, Meena Shorey, Nasira, Asif Jah	Drama, Romance	This film story was based on the love story of Waris Shah and Bhag Bhari. The film was released on 14 March 1964.This movie was a biography of the traditional Punjabi epic love story author and 18th century poet Waris Shah.
1965
Dharti Veeran	Baldev R. Jhingan	Manohar Deepak, Rajinder Kapoor, Madhumati, Nishi	Drama	IMDb
Sassi Punnu	Shanti Prakash Bakshi			IMDb
Shokan Mele Di	Kewal Mishra	Indira, Ravindra Kapoor	Drama	IMDb
Chokidar		Naghma, Asad Bokhari, Zahoor Shah	Drama	
Doli	Haider Chaudhry	Naghma, Akmal Khan, Mazhar Shah	Romance; Drama	This was a musical super-hit movie of 1965 with music by Manzoor Ashraf and film song lyrics by Tanvir Naqvi
Had Haram	Anwar Kamal Pasha	Shirin, Allauddin, Asif Jah	Comedy; Romance	Music by Master Abdullah
Heer Sial	Jafar Bokhari	Firdous, Akmal Khan, M. Ismael	Musical story based on a Punjabi epic love story	The film was released on 3 September 1965, and was a musical hit with music by Bakhshi Wazir film song lyrics by Tanvir Naqvi
Ik Si Chor	Amin Malik	Shirin, Allauddin, Yousuf Khan	Drama	Music by Master Abdullah
Jeedaar	M. J. Rana	Neelo, Sudhir, Habib, Shirin, Rangeela, Munawar Zarif	Musical; Drama	The film was released on 19 November 1965.Music by Rasheed Attre, film song lyrics by Hazeen Qadri.This was a Platinum Jubilee film.
Jhanjhar		Firdous, Habib, Adeeb	Romance	
Malangi	Rasheed Akhtar	Shirin, Akmal Khan, Firdous, Yousuf Khan, Zumurrud, Munawar Zarif	Musical; Drama	The film was released on 14 December 1965.Super-hit music by Master Abdullah and lyrics by Hazin Qadri.A Golden Jubilee film of 1965.
Mann Mouji		Shirin, Sudhir, Akmal	Drama	This movie had music by Tufail Farooqi, film song lyrics by Hazeen Qadri
Phanney Khan		Shirin, Sudhir, Allauddin	Romance, Drama	Super-hit music by Salim Iqbal and film song lyrics by Hazin Qadri.
Pilpili Sahib		Naghma, Akmal Khan, Noor Mohammed Charlie		
Punjab Da Sher		Naghma, Akmal Khan, Mazhar Shah	Drama	
Soukan		Yasmin, Akmal Khan, Mazhar Shah	Drama, Romance	
1966
Chaddian Di Doli	Lal Singh Kalsi	I. S. Johar, Manmohan Krishna, Majnu, Helen	Comedy	IMDb
Dulla Bhatti	Baldev R. Jhingan	Sunder		IMDb
Shehar Di Kudi	Jagdev Bhambri	Indira Billi, Shivkumar, Jagdev, Boota, Sunder, Krishna Kumari, Tari, Indira Bansal	Drama	IMDb
Gabroo Desh Punjab De	D. Sohna	Manohar Deepak, Farida Jalal, Ravindra Kapoor, Randhawa	Drama	IMDb
Laiye Tod Nibhaiye	Satish Chabbra	Nishi, Ravindra Kapoor, Ravi Khanna, Gopal Saigal, Satish Chabbra, V. Gopal, Sheela R, Ram Avtar, Rajnath	Drama	IMDb
Bharia Mela	Aslam Irani	Naghma, Akmal Khan, Sawan, Talish, Rangeela, Munawar Zarif	Romance, Drama	A super-hit musical film of 1966 with music by Ghulam Ahmed Chishti.
1967
Kade Dhupp Kade Chhaan	Lal Singh Kalsi	Lata Arora, Anwar Hussain, Daisy Irani, Jabeen Jalil, Uma Khosla, Purendra, Gopal Saigal, Sunder	Drama	IMDb
Khed Pritan De	Joginder Samra	Indira Billi, Ravindra Kapoor, Yash Sharma, Joginder Samra		
Lava Phuteya		Manohar Deepak, Kamlesh Gill	Drama	IMDb
Neem Hakeem	B.S. Glaad, Produced by V. Gopal	V. Gopal, Indira Billi, Ravindra Kapoor, Majnu, Ram Mohan, Gopal Saigal	Drama	IMDb, YouTube
Mirza Jat	Masood Pervaiz	Firdous, Ejaz Durrani, Aalia, Munawar Zarif, Meena Shorey, Ilyas Kashmiri	Romance, Drama	A Golden Jubilee film of 1967 that was also based on an epic love story of Punjab- Mirza Sahiban.Superb music of Rasheed Attre before he died in 1967.Excellent and super-sentimental film songs by the eminent lyricist Ahmad Rahi.
Imam Din Gohavia	M Saleem and Mohsin Jamali	Firdous, Akmal Khan, Yousuf Khan, Talish, Munawar Zarif	Historical Drama	Music by Ghulam Ahmed Chishti, film song lyrics by Khawaja Pervez
1968
Punjabi Munda		Indira, Ravindra Kapoor		
1969
Nanak Naam Jahaz Hai	Ram Maheshwari	Prithviraj Kapoor, David Abraham, Som Dutt, I. S. Johar, Nishi, Tiwari, Jagdish Raj, Suresh, Veena, Vimmi	Drama	IMDb
Mukhda Chan Warga	Joginder Samra	Lata Arora, Indira Billi, Ravindra Kapoor, Ajay Kumar, Lalit Kumar, Majnu, Lalit Mohan	Drama	IMDb
Pardesan	Khawar Zaman	Indira Billi, Prem Chopra, Khairati, V. Gopal, Chand Burqe, Mirza Musharaf, Ram Avtar, Tun Tun	Drama	IMDb
Paun Baran	Rajendra Sharma	Ravindra Kapoor, Nandini, Gopal Saigal, Khairati, Raj Mala	Drama	IMDb
Mukhra Chann Warga	Waheed Dar	Naghma, Habib, Rani, Yousuf Khan	Romance film	This was a super-hit Punjabi film of 1969 with music by Ghulam Ahmed Chishti.
Dupatta	Mohinder Wah	Joy Mukherjee, Indira, Ravindra Kapoor, Sonia Sahni, Gopal Saigal, Manorama, Kamal Kapoor	Family	IMDb
Kulli Yaar Di	B. S. Shaad	Indira, B. S. Shaad	Drama	IMDb
Maa Da Laadla	Subhash C. Bhakri	Khairati, Majnu, Mehar Mittal, Vijay Tandon	Comedy	IMDb

== 1970s ==
Year	Title	Director	Cast	Genre	Notes
1970	Nanak Dukhiya Sub Sansar	Dara Singh	Prithviraj Kapoor, Balraj Sahni, Dara Singh, Pran, Som Dutt, Meena Rai, Achala Sachdev, Ram Mohan, Mumtaz Begum	Action, Drama	IMDb
1970	Kankan De Ohle	Om Bedi	Dharmendra, Asha Parekh, Jeevan, Ravinder Kapoor, Indira, Uma Dutt, Mumtaz Begum, Anwar Hussain	Action, Drama	IMDb
1970	Heer Ranjha	Masud Pervez	Firdous, Ejaz Durrani, Zamurrad, Ajmal	Romance, Drama	This was a Golden Jubilee film of 1970 with music by Khawaja Khurshid Anwar and lyrics by Ahmad Rahi
1972	Jeeto	Ramesh Bedi	Khairati, Uma Khosla, Paresh Nanda, Savita	Romance	IMDb
1972	Mele Mitran De	Chaman Lal Shugal	Dara Singh, Prithviraj Kapoor, Tun Tun, King Kong, Meena Rai	Romance	IMDb
1972	Basheera	Aslam Dar	Sultan Rahi, Habib-ur-Rehman, Rozina, Aalia, Rangeela, Meena Chaudhry, Taya Barkat, Ilyas Kashmiri	Action film	Sultan Rahi got his big breakthrough in the Pakistani film industry by playing the title role of 'Basheera' in this film. A Diamond Jubilee film of 1972. Super-hit music by Kamal Ahmad, film song lyrics by Mushir Kazmi and Bashir Khokhar
1972	Do Pattar Annaran De	Haider Chaudhry	Rozina, Habib-ur-Rehman, Ejaz Durrani, Sultan Rahi, Munawar Zarif, Chun Chun	Romance	A Golden Jubilee film of 1972 with super-hit film songs by music director M. Ashraf and lyrics by Khawaja Pervez
1972	Zaildar	Haider Chaudhry	Firdous, Habib-ur-Rehman, Sawan!, Zumurrud	Drama	A musical hit movie of 1972 with music by Ghulam Ahmed Chishti and lyrics by Khawaja Pervez
1973	Man Jeete Jag Jeet	B.S. Thapa	Sunil Dutt, Radha Saluja, Harbhajan Jabbal, Sona, Ranjeet	Action, Drama, Crime	IMDb
1973	Tere Rang Nyare	Pushp Raj	Som Dutt, Meena Rai, Yash Sharma, Renu,Mehar Mittal, Ram Mohan, Navin Nischol, Deven Verma, Satish Chabra, Kartar singh (Judges assistant in court), Paintal, Manmohan	Drama	IMDb
1973	Sherni	Chamann Nillay	Subhash Ghai, Aruna Irani, Ravindra Kapoor, Mehar Mittal, Prem Nath, Radha Saluja, Tun Tun	Action	IMDb
1973	Ziddi	Iqbal Kashmiri	Yousuf Khan, Firdous, Nabila, Ilyas Kashmiri, Munawar Zarif	Romance, Drama	This film had superb music by Master Abdullah and film song lyrics by Hazin Qadri.This was a Golden Jubilee film of 1973.
1973	Jeera Blade	Iftikhar Khan	Munawar Zarif, Aasia, Tanzeem Hassan, Saiqa, Aslam Pervaiz, Afzal Ahmed, Bahar Begum	Social	A Golden Jubilee film of 1974
1974	Naukar Wohti Da	Haider Chaudhry	Munawar Zarif, Aasia, Mumtaz, Afzal Ahmed, Shahid, Habib, Talish	Romance	A Platinum Jubilee film of 1974 with super-hit music by Wajahat Attre and lyrics by Khawaja Pervez.
1974	Sacha Mera Roop Hai	B. S. Shaad	Sarita, Harinder, Manmohan Krishna, Mehar Mittal, Helen, Jeevan, Rajendra Nath, Ranjit, Tun Tun	Family	IMDb
1974	Satguru Teri Oat	Kaka Sharma	Dara Singh, Som Dutt, Music by Jagjit Kaur	Drama	IMDb
1974	Bhagat Dhanna Jatt	Dara Singh	Dara Singh, Yogeeta Bali, Abhi Bhattacharya, Jayshree Gadkar, V. Gopal, Jankidas, Feroz Khan, Padma Khanna, Lalita Kumari	Action, Comedy, Drama	IMDb
1974	Dukh Bhanjan Tera Naam	B.S Thapa	Shaminder Singh, Radha Saluja, Rajendra Kumar (Special Appearance), Dharmendra (Special Appearance), Dara Singh, Sunil Dutt, Manmohan Krishna, Johnny Walker, Om Prakash, D. K. Sapru		IMDb
1974	Do Sher	Sukhdev Ahluwalia	Dharmendra, Rajendra Kumar, Gauri Verma, Narendra		IMDb
1974	Amar Saheed Bhagat Singh	Omi Bedi	Rajni Bala, Som Dutt,Achala Sachdev, Dara Singh, Azaad Irani,Dav Kumar, Kharati, Kamal Kapoor, Shivraj,	historical biographical	IMDb
1975	Sharif Badmash	Iqbal Kashmiri	Yousuf Khan, Mumtaz, Sultan Rahi, Aasiya	Drama	A Golden Jubilee film with super-hit music by Master Abdullah
1975	Wehshi Jatt	Hassan Askari	Sultan Rahi, Aasia, Iqbal Hassan, Ghazala, Afzal Ahmed, Ilyas Kashmiri	Action	
1975	Sheeda Pastol	Sharif Ali	Munawar Zarif, Aasia, Saiqa, Afzal Ahmed, Aslam Pervaiz, Nayyar Sultana, Sultan Rahi	Social	
1975	Teri Meri Ik Jindri	Dharm Kumar	Manmohan Krishna, Meena Rai	Drama	IMDb
1975	Mittar Pyare Nu	B.S.Shaad	B.S Shaad, Meena Rai, Sarita,Manorama (Hindi actress), Vijay Tandon, Uma Dutt,Meher Mittal, Manmohan Krishna, Yash Sharma, Rajan Haksar, Sunder, Rajwant Rangila, Murad	Drama	IMDb
1975	Daku Shamsher Singh	Pushp Raaj	Dev Kumar, Ranjeet, Sarita	Action	IMDb
1975	Dharamjeet	Sukhdev Ahluwalia	Aruna Irani, Mehar Mittal, Raza Murad, Mahendra Sandhu, Tun Tun,		IMDb
1975	Morni	Jugal Kishore	Satish Kaul, Radha Saluja	Comedy	
1976 (Indian)	Naukar Biwi Da	H.S.Kanwal	Rani, Harish, Brahamchari, Coca-Cola, Manju, Surjeet Kapoor, Ranooka, Shalini Tagore, Ravina, Premjeet, Sawarn Dada		
1976 (Indian)	Sardar-e-Azam				
1976 (Indian)	Dharti Saddi Maa	Surinder Singh			
1976 (Indian)	Giddha	B.S. Shaad	Dharmendra, Dara Singh, Veerendra, Mehar Mittal, Daljeet Kaur, Manorama		
1976 (Indian)	Main Papi Tum Bakhshanhaar	Subhash Bhakri	Dharmendra, Ashok Chopra, Shama, Yash Sharma, Yogesh Chabra, Ritu Kamal, Rajni Bala, Bharat Bhushan, Mehar Mittal		
1976 (Indian)	Santo Banto	Ajit Singh Deol	Dharmendra, Shatrughan Sinha, Mehar Mittal, Veerendra, Aruna Irani, Manmohan KrishnaAjit Singh From, Harbajan Jabal		
1976 (Indian)	Sawa Lakh Se Ek Ladaun	Dara Singh	Dara Singh, Komila Wirk, Navin Nischol, Yogita Bali, Rajesh Khanna, Neetu Singh (Guest Appearance), Randhawa, Yash Sharma, Mumtaz Begum, Sunder, Mehar Mittal, Jankidas, Birbal		
1976 (Indian)	Taakra	Sukhdev Ahluwalia	Varinder, Raza Murad, Sarita, Payal, Vijay Tandon, Mumtaz Shanti, Mehar Mittal		
1976 (Indian)	Yamla Jatt	Om Bedi	I.S.Johar, Helen		
1976 (Indian)	Daaj	Dharam Kumar	Dheeraj Kumar, Mehar Mittal, Jeevan, Madan Puri, Nasir Hussain, Mumtaz Begum		
1976 (Indian)	Papi Tarey Anek	Dharam Kumar	Dheeraj Kumar, Mina Rai, Jaishree T, Manmohan Krishna, Om Prakash		
1976 (Indian)	Chadi Jawani Budhe Nu	A. Salam	B.S. Sood,Rajendra Nath, B. K. Sood, Kimti Anand, Subhash Sethi, Vasundara, Bhola Walia, Kamleshwar, Dolly Mehra, Daman Kaushik, Madan Sharma		F.C. Mehra
1976 (Indian)	Change Mande Tere Bande	Subhash Bhakri			
1976 (Pakistani)	Hukam Da Ghulam	M. Saleem	Munawar Zarif, Aasia, Nimmo, Nanha, Sheikh Iqbal, Talish, Nabeela	Social	
1976 (Pakistani)	Jano Kapatti	Naseem Haidar Shah	Munawar Zarif, Aasia, Iqbal Hassan, Anita, Najma Mehboob, Munawar Saeed	Social	
1976 (Pakistani)	Chitra Te Shera	Iqbal Kashmiri	Aasia, Yousuf Khan, Sultan Rahi, Munawar Zarif, Nayyar Sultana	Action	This was a flop film of 1976
1976 (Pakistani)	Jat Kurrian Tau Darda	Syed Kamal	Neelo, Syed Kamal, Nisho, Ishrat Chaudhary, Nazli, Najma, Munawwar Saeed, Rangeela, Aslam Pervaiz, Nazar	Comedy, Musical	A Golden Jubilee film of 1976. Super-hit music and film songs by Wajahat Attre, film song lyrics by Khawaja Pervez
1976 (Pakistani)	Badtameez	Haidar Chodhary	Munawar Zarif, Aasia, Qavi Khan, Nisho, Aslam Pervaiz, Nayyar Sultana	Social	
1977	Guru Manio Granth	S.R Kapoor	Joginder, Manmohan Krishan, Sapru, Pinchoo Kapoor, Mumtaz Begum, Uma Khosla, Rajesh Behal, Ram Mohan, Sarita		
1977	Gyani Ji	Chaman Nillay	Sunil Dutt, Reena Roy, Prem Nath, Kamini Kaushal, Shatrughan Sinha, Parikshit Sahni, Amrish Puri, Rajendra Nath, Manorama, Laj Bedi,		
1977	Saal Solvan Chadya	Surinder Singh	Zaheera, Devender Khandelwal, Girija Mitra, Makhan Singh, Chaman Puri, Kulwant, Abhimanyu Sharma, Jagat Singh, Sudha Chopra, Tina Katkar, Neelu, Bhupinder Kaur, Manju Bhatia, Rekha (Guest Appearance)		
1977	Shaheed Kartar Singh Sarabha	Pratab Sagar			
1977	Sat Sri Akal	Chaman Nillay	Sunil Dutt, Shatrughan Sinha, Reena Roy, Parikshit Sahni, Zaheera, Prem Nath		
1977	Sassi Punnu	Satish Bhakhri	Satish Kaul, Bhavana Bhatt		
1977	Jai Mata Di	Daljit	Sardar Akhtar		
1977	Lachhi	Satish Bhakri	Satish Kaul, Bhavana Bhatt, Madan Puri, Raza Murad, Rajendra Nath, Meher Mittal, Gopal Sehgal, Ram Mohan, Mumtaz Begum, Bhag Singh, Yash Sharma, Tun Tun, Jugnu		
1977	Vangaar	Prof. Nirula	Baldev Khosa, Vijay Tandon, Meena Rai, Ruby Singh, Madan Puri, Manmohan Krishna, Chaman Puri, Kanchan Mattu, Mehar Mittal		
1977	Sadqay Teri Mout Tun				
1977	Sarfarosh				
1977	Nachdi Jawani	Som Haksar	Dharmendra in Guest appearance,Romesh Sharma, Sunder, Meena Rai, Sujit Kumar, Rajendra Nath, Nana Palsikar, Manorma, Rajan Haksar, Indra Bansal,Mumtaz Begum, Birbal, Randhir		
1977	Aj Diyan Kurrian	Syed Kamal	Nisho, Neelo, Saiqa, Syed Kamal, Najma, Rangeela, Asha Posley, Nazar	Romance, Musical	A Golden Jubilee film of 1977. Super-hit music and film songs by Wajahat Attre and lyrics by Hazin Qadri

== 1980s ==
Title	Director	Cast (Subject of documentary)	Genre	Notes	Ref
Anokha Daaj	Aslam Dar	Asiya, Sultan Rahi, Durdana Rehman, Waheed Murad, Sabiha, Ilyas Kashmiri	Action, Drama		
Athra Puttar	Altaf Hussain	Asiya, Sultan Rahi, Bazgha, Nanha, Ali Ejaz, Mustafa Qureshi, Ilyas Kashmiri, Sawan, Rangeela	Action, Drama		
Chan Varyam	Jahangir Qaisar	Sultan Rahi, Anjuman, Iqbal Hassan, Afzaal Ahmad, Mustafa Qureshi, Humayun Qureshi, Shugafta	Action, Drama		
Khan-e-Azam	Younis Malik	Sudhir, Aasia, Sultan Rahi, Mustafa Qureshi, Nazli, Zahir Shah, Bahar	Action, Drama		
Muftbar	Hassan Askari	Sultan Rahi, Anjuman, Ali Ejaz, Huma Daar, Afzaal Ahmad, Najma Mehboob	Comedy, Action		
Vilayati Babu	Dharam Kumar	Mehar Mittal, Amitabh Bachchan, Reena Roy, Yogesh Chhabra, Nasir Hussain	Comedy, Romance	18 September 1981	
Jeedar					

== See also ==
- List of Punjabi films of the 2000s
- List of Punjabi films of the 2010s
- List of Punjabi films of the 2020s
