= Laiye Todh Nibhaiye =

1966 film

- Directed by: Satish Chabbra
- Screenplay by: Balkrishna Mauj
- Story by: Balkrishna Mauj
- Produced by: Krishan Lal Varma
- Starring: Nishi; Ravindra Kapoor
- Cinematography: Mohan Keshwani
- Edited by: Hari Pathare
- Music by: S Madan
- Production company: Varma International Pictures
- Distributed by: Varma International Pictures
- Release date: 1966
- Running time: 136 minutes
- Country: India
- Language: Punjabi

Laiye Tod Nibhiye (English translation: "Let's forever be together") is a 1966 Punjabi-language film directed by Satish Chabbra.

Starring Nishi and Ravindra Kapoor in the lead roles with Gopal Sehgal, Sheela R and Ravi Khanna in supporting roles.

Previously Nishi, who played the lead female role in Laiye Tod Nibhiye had worked in supporting roles in three films produced by Varma Films and its affiliates: Baghi Sipahi (1958), Night Club (1958) and Main Nashe Mein Hoon (1959). Laiye Tod Nibhiye marked the first time Nishi had been cast in a lead role in a film associated with the Varma family.

The prominence of Laiye Tod Nibhiye arises from the ensemble compiled by the filmmakers for the film. First, Nishi, the lead actress, as well as Ravindra Kapoor, the lead actor of Laiye Tod Nibhiye, were at the prime of their careers in the Punjabi cinema, as evidenced by how prolific each of them was during the 1960s, the decade in which Laiye Todh Nibhiye was released. The List of Punjabi films of the 1960s shows that each of these stars were featured in lead roles in at least 10 Punjabi films during the 1960s. Not surprisingly, Nishi was branded as a "big name in Punjabi cinema" and called the "mother of Punjabi cinema."

Second, considering the widely held belief regarding the impact of Indian film songs on a movie's commercial success, the significance of Laiye Tod Nibhiye emerges from the collaboration between its music composer, the lyricists and the playback singers used for its songs. Following the triumph of the Punjabi-language movies Lado Rani (1963) and Mama Ji (1964), S. Madan, the music composer of Laiye Tod Nibhiye gained widespread fame all across the Punjab region and was recognized as a major composer in the Punjabi film industry. Both of the lyricists, Verma Malik and Naqsh Lyallpuri were renowned in the Punjabi cinema. Finally, the playback singers for the film included: Mohammed Rafi, voted the Greatest Voice in Hindi Cinema in a CNN-IBN's poll, the legendary Shamshad Begum and Asha Bhonsle, believed to be on the list of singers to have sung the highest number of film songs.

Overall, Laiye Tod Nibhiye, released during the Golden Age of Hindi Cinema which unfolded from the late 1940s to the 1960s, exemplifies how filmmakers in that era strategically collaborated with renowned stars, music composers, lyricists and playback singers to achieve the commercial success of a film.

== Plot ==
After being ousted from their city college and failing to gain admission in another college, Kishan and Bhola return to their village. Both deceive their ignorant fathers about their being expelled from college by claiming to have passed their exams. While living in the village, Kishan falls in love with Jeeto, the village beauty, and in time manages to win her over. Nevertheless, Dharmu, the village bully, is also in love with Jeeto and becomes increasingly furious as Kishan and Jeeto's relationship deepens.

While the relationship between Kishan and proceeds, Bhola gets engaged to his beloved Taro after many pranks with her father. Meanwhile, Dharmu challenges Kishan to a fist fight at the Baisakhi Mela after failing to vilify him with his malevolent tactics. Kishan emerges victorious at the fist fight, and Dharmu is consequently compelled to shave off his mustache. Boiling with fury, Dharmu schemes to do away with Kishan with the assistance of his friend Govinda. A physical confrontation breaks out between the three, and Govinda loses his life. Dharmu takes advantage of this situation and convinces Jeeto's father, Hari Ram, to promise her hand in marriage to him. The rest of the film unpacks the consequences that emerge from the conflicts which arise from this situation.

== Cast ==
- Nishi as Jeeto
- Ravindra Kapoor as Kishan
- Gopal Sehgal as Bhola
- Sheela R as Taro
- Ravi Khanna as Dharmu
- Jaggi as Govinda
- Ram Avtar as Lala Gujjar
- Ramlal as Gopal Das
- V Gopal as Subedar
- Ved Anand as Nai

== Soundtrack ==
All the songs of Laiye Todh Nibhiye were composed by S. Madan and the lyrics were penned by Verma Malik and Naqsh Lyallpuri. The playback singers were Mohammed Rafi, Asha Bhosle, Shamshad Begum, Krishna Kalle, Minoo Purshottam, S. Balbir and Surinder Kohli.

Track #	Song	Singer(s)
1	"Duniya Ek Paasse"	Mohammed Rafi, S. Balbir
2	"Ni Chadhya Sal Sohalvan"	Asha Bhosle
3	"Jee Karda Hai"	Mohammed Rafi, S. Balbir, Asha Bhosle, Minoo Purshottam
4	" Meri Lad Gai Akh"	Shamshad Begum, Minoo Purshottam
5	Bari Barsi Khattan Gia	Mohammed Rafi, Asha Bhosle
6	"Balle Balle"	Mohammed Rafi
7	"Piveh Piveh Piveh Kaleyan Da Dudh"	Surinder Kohli, Minoo Purshottam
8	"Aa Mere Kol"	Krishna Kalle
