= Haathkadi =

Haathkadi may refer to:

- Hathkadi (1958 film), a 1958 Indian film
- Haathkadi (1982 film), a 1982 Indian Hindi-language film
- Haathkadi (1995 film), a 1995 Indian action film
