= Hathkadi (1958 film) =

- Directed by: Sudarshan Bhatia
- Starring: Motilal; Shakila
- Music by: Nashad
- Release date: 1 January 1958
- Country: India
- Language: Hindi

Hathkadi is a 1958 Bollywood film starring Motilal and Shakila. The movie is directed by Sudarshan Bhatia and music is directed by Nashad. The movie was released on 1 January 1958.

== Cast ==
- Cuckoo
- Jabeen Jalil
- Motilal
- Murad
- Sajjan
- Shakila

== Music ==
1. "Piya Jab Se Liya Tune Hatho Me Hath" - Mohammed Rafi, Lata Mangeshkar
2. "Dunia Hai Badi Zalim" - Asha Bhosle, Mohammed Rafi
3. "Chori Chori Aana Aadhi Rat Re Sajanwa" - Sudha Malhotra, Usha Mangeshkar
4. "Gira Ke Chal Diye" - Asha Bhosle
5. "Mai Jau Kaha Lut Gaya Mera Jaha" - Asha Bhosle
6. "Sun Dil Ki Dhadkane O Mere Raja" - Shamshad Begum, Khan Mastana
