= List of Punjabi films of the 2020s =

== 2020 ==
- Khatre Da Ghuggu (17 January 2020)
- Jinde Meriye (24 January 2020)
- Gandhi Fer Aa Gea (31 January 2020)
- Zakhmi (7 February 2020)
- Sufna (14 February 2020)
- Ik Sandhu Hunda Si (28 February 2020)
- Jora – The Second Chapter (6 March 2020)
- Ikko Mikke (13 March 2020)

== 2021 ==
- Shava Ni Girdhari Lal (17 Dec 2021)
- Marjaney (10 Dec 2021)
- Kaka Pardha (10 Dec 2021)
- Jamraud (10 Dec 2021)
- Teeja Punjab (3 Dec 2021)
- Kade Haan Kade Naa (3 Dec 2021)
- Ikko Mikke (26 Nov 2021)
- Amrika My Dream (26 Nov 2021)
- Warning (19 Nov 2021)
- Fuffad Ji (11 Nov 2021)
- Paani Ch Madhaani (4 Nov 2021)
- Yes I Am Student (22 Oct 2021)
- Jinne Jamme Saare Nikamme (22 Oct 2021)
- Honsla Rakh (15 Oct 2021)
- Moosa Jatt (8 Oct 2021)
- Dustbin (8 Oct 2021)
- Chal Mera Putt 3 (1 Oct 2021)
- Teri Meri Nahi Nibhni (25 Sept 2021)
- Please Kill Me (24 Sept 2021)
- Qismat 2 (24 Sept 2021)
- Thana Sadar (17 Sept 2021)
- Yaar Anmulle Returns (10 Sept 2021)
- Aape Pein Siyaape
- Pinky Moge Wali 2
- Puaada
- Kuriyan Jawan Bapu
- Preshaan
- Teeja Punjab
- Kade Haan Kade Naa
- Thana Sadar
- Yaar Anmulle Returns
- Marjaney
- Yes I am Student
- Jinne Jamme Saare
- Nikamme
- Jhalle Pai Gaye Palle
- Angrej Putt
- Qismat 2
- Moosa Jatt
- Gangster Vs State 2
- Ucha Pind
- Dustbin
- Chal Mera Putt 3
- Panchhi
- Please Kill Me
- Butta American
- Kala Shehar
- Honsla Rakh
- Teri Meri Nahi Nibhni
- Qazi
- Seep
- Kaka Pardhan
- Warning
- Tunka Tunka
- Jamraud
- Waleed
- Good Luck Jatta
- Ullu De Patthey
- Happy Happy Ho Gaya

== 2022 ==
- Ni Main Sass Kuttni (29 April 2022)
- Main Te Bapu (22 April 2022)
- Galwakdi (8 April 2022)
- Lekh (1 April 2022)
- Babbar (18 Mar 2022)
- Main Viyah Nahi Karona (4 Mar 2022)
- Jatt Brothers (25 Feb 2022)
- Aaja Mexico Challiye (25 Feb 2022)
- Haterz (17 Feb 2022)
- Jal Wayu Enclave (11 Feb 2022)
