= R. G. Anand v. Deluxe Films =

Supreme Court of India case about the idea-expression dichotomy

RG Anand v. Deluxe Films
- Court: Supreme Court of India
- Citation: AIR 1978 SC 1613

RG Anand v. Delux Films, (AIR 1978 SC 1613) is a landmark decision of the Supreme Court of India in the area of copyright law. The case deals with a copyright infringement suit against the film New Delhi made by Mohan Sehgal in 1954. The plaintiff R.G. Anand, contended that it was modeled on the plot of a play Hum Hindustani written and produced by him. The judgment is remarkable for clarifying the concepts of idea-expression dichotomy and copyright infringement under the Indian copyright law.

== Background of the case ==
The plaintiff wrote the play Ham Hindustani and it soon became very popular. In 1954, the defendant Mohan Sehgal sent a letter to the plaintiff that he wishes to make a film based on the play. The plaintiff met the defendant and discussed the entire play. The defendant did not commit anything, but the plaintiff later came to know that the defendant released a film titled New Delhi. After watching the film, the plaintiff was of the opinion that it is based on the story of his play. So he filed a suit against the defendant for permanent injunction and damages. Both the District Court and the High Court ruled against the plaintiff on a finding of the facts. The case finally reached the Supreme Court of India.

== Relevant legal framework ==
A Play is a dramatic work under Section 2(h) of the Copyright Act, 1957. The movie will be an 'adaptation' as per Section 2(a)(i). For a dramatic work, making an adaptation is a statutory right provided under Section 14 (a)(vi) of the Copyright Act, 1957. A movie which copies a play will be an infringement as per Section 51 unless excluded by Section 52.

== Facts ==
This section has the storyline of the play and the movie followed by comparison table for identifying similarities and differences in the play.

=== Play ===
A Madrasi and Punjabi family are neighbours. They have cordial relations. Chandra, the daughter in the Punjabi family and Amni, the son in the Madrasi family fall in love with each other. Both sets of parents are against this affair and set out to find same-community matches for their kids. By a divine coincidence both engage Dhanwantri-a marriage broker for this purpose. Chandra's parents find a boy named Bansi for her. Chandra asks Amni to talk to his parents but he prefers suicide instead. Eventually, both enter into a suicidal pact and run away leaving behind a suicide note. Before they go ahead with their plan, Dhanwantri intervenes and gets them married. In another scene, the parents are distraught to find the note and regret their aversion to inter-community marriage but at the same time the married couple enters.

=== Movie ===
Anand, a graduate comes from Punjab to Delhi and meets Janaki, a Madrasi girl on the railway station. Anand finds it difficult to find accommodation and has to pretend to be a Madrasi. Subramanian, father of Janaki lives close by and meets Anand. Anand happens to join the music school where Janaki teaches. Janaki is impressed by Anand's singing and slowly falls for him. She invites him to a celebration at her house. Next day, he plans a date with Janaki but realizes that his father and sister are arriving in town. He goes out on the pretext of showing the city to his sister Nikki and meets an acquaintance Ashok Banerjee, a Bengali painter there. He leaves his sister with Ashok and goes to meet Janaki. Later all 4 of them come face to face and Anand does not introduce Nikki as his sister to Janaki at which Nikki gets offended. He later explains the whole situation to her. Meanwhile, Ashok falls for Nikki. Subramaniam wants Anand to marry Janaki and invites his father to discuss this. Anand takes his south Indian cook as his father to their house. The principal of the music school invites Anand and Janaki for an award ceremony where Anand again has to present the cook as his father and because of this the actual father gets offended. He goes to the stage and beats up the cook. The truth about Anand being a Punjabi and not a Madrasi is out. Both fathers don't like their kids associating with a person from another community. Subramaniam arranges Janaki's marriage. Anand asks Janaki to negotiate with her father. Janaki tries but is rebuked by her father. Janaki is frustrated and runs away leaving a suicide note. At the river which is the spot she chooses to die, she meets an old friend of her fathers who promises to help her. He takes her to Anand's father's house where she pretends to be a Punjabi girl and the proposal for marriage is accepted. In another story, Nikki's marriage has been arranged with someone from her own community after her father got to know about her and Ashok's affair. At the marriage ceremony, the groom demands dowry. Nikki's father is unable to pay. Ashok arrives on the scene and offers his mother's jewelry to pay for Nikki's dowry. Nikki's father has an awakening and after seeing the difference between the values of Ashok and the Punjabi groom, he agrees to an alliance between Nikki and Ashok. Thus, there is a happy ending for all parties involved.

== Important issues discussed by the Court ==
- Is the film New Delhi an infringement of the plaintiff's copyright in the play Hum Hindustani?
- Have defendants or any of them infringed the plaintiff's copyright by producing, or distributing or exhibiting the film New Delhi?

== Important aspects of the decision ==
The Court clarified the following important aspects in this case -

1. There can be no copyright in an idea, subject-matter, themes, plots or historical or legendary facts and violation of the copyright in such cases is confined to the form, manner and arrangement and expression of the idea by the author of the copyrighted work.
2. It has to be seen whether similarities are fundamental or substantial aspects of the mode of expression adopted in the copyrighted work. Copying should be substantial or material one.
3. Test: Whether the viewer after having read or seen both the works is clearly of the opinion and gets an unmistakable impression that the subsequent work appears to be a copy of the original.
4. Where theme is same but presented differently, there can be no question of infringement.
5. If there are material and broad dissimilarities along with similarities, it negatives the intention to copy the original work. If the coincidences appearing in the work are clearly incidental then there can't be infringement.
6. If the viewer after the incident gets the idea that the film is by and large a copy of the original play, violation of the copyright may be said to be proved.
7. Burden of proof is on the plaintiff in cases where a stage play has been infringed by a movie director.

After applying the principles enunciated above the court ruled that it cannot be said that the film is a "[s]ubstantial or material copy of the play written by the plaintiff."(Para 67) The judges were of the opinion that no prudent person after seeing both the works will get the impression that there is a copy. At most, the central theme of provincialism is the same but that is an idea not protected by copyright. Justice Pathak in his concurring opinion said "[t]he story portrayed by the film travels beyond the plot delineated in the play." (Para 72) He also observed that "[i]n the attempt to show that he is not guilty of infringement of copyright, it is always possible for a person intending to take advantage of the intellectual effort and labours of another to so develop his own product that it covers a wider field than the area included within the scope of the earlier product, and in the common area covered by the two productions to introduce changes in order to disguise the attempt at plagiarism." (Para 72) However he said, in the present case the dissimilarities are so material that it is not possible to say that there is an infringement. For future cases, he opined that "[i]n another, and perhaps a clearer case, it may be necessary for this Court to interfere and remove the impression which may have gained ground that the copyright belonging to an author can be readily infringed by making immaterial changes, introducing insubstantial differences and enlarging the scope of the original theme so that a veil of apparent dissimilarity is thrown around the work now produced. The court will look strictly at not only blatant examples of copying but also at reprehensible attempts at colourable limitation." (Para 72)

== Significance of the decision ==
This judgement is considered as a landmark decision in the area of Indian copyright law. Most importantly, it clarified that copyright protection does not extend to mere ideas. This case has been cited and followed in many of the subsequent judgments from different courts in India. One of the most recent ones is Mansoob Haider v. Yashraj Films, from the Bombay High Court where the Court had to decide whether the Bollywood movie Dhoom 3 was an infringement of the plaintiff's copyright in the script ONCE.

To some extent the test laid down by the Supreme Court in this case can be compared with the Nichols abstraction test in the US. The residue after filtering out dissimilarities is the idea which is not copyrightable and similarity of ideas does not lead to copyright infringement.
