= Taj Mahal (1963 film) =

1963 film

- Taj Mahal poster
- Directed by: M. Sadiq
- Written by: Qamar Jalalabadi (story & screenplay); Tabish Sultanpuri (dialogue)
- Produced by: A.K. Nadiadwala
- Starring: Pradeep Kumar; Bina Rai; Veena; Rehman; Jeevan; Jabeen Jalil
- Cinematography: G. Balakrishna
- Edited by: Moosa Mansoor
- Music by: Roshan
- Distributed by: Video Sound
- Release date: 1963
- Running time: 145 minutes
- Country: India
- Language: Urdu

Taj Mahal is a 1963 Indian film based on the historical legend of the Mughal emperor Shah Jahan, who built the Taj Mahal in fond remembrance and as a tomb for his beloved wife Mumtaz Mahal.

Taj Mahal was a commercial hit, but is remembered mostly for its Filmfare award-winning music.

== Plot ==
It was at the Meena Bazar that Shehzada Khurram (Pradeep Kumar) first laid eyes on Arjumand Banu (Bina Rai). When their eyes met, it was love at first sight for both of them. When empress Noor Jehan, one of the wives of Shahenshah Jehangir (Rehman), finds out she is enraged, as she wants Khurram to marry her daughter, Ladli Banu, even though Arjumand is her niece. She plots to hold Arjumand as a prisoner in her palace, but in vain; then she attempts to have Khurram sent away to battle - again in vain, as Khurram returns triumphant, and is named 'Shah Jehan'. Then she has her step-son, Saifuddin, arrange to kill Khurram - again in vain. Khurram gets stabbed but with Arjuman's help he recovers, returns home, but does not tell his father, fearing for his health. When Jehangir hears of Arjumand's assistance, he gladly arranges their marriage, while Saifuddin ends up marrying Ladli. Then Khurram is sent away to another kingdom, leaving Noor Jehan to plot against him. When Jehangir falls ill, she takes over the reins, has Khurram declared an intruder and sends her armies to bring him in or alternatively his two sons. Watch as events unfold, which will ultimately lead to the building of one of the seven wonders of the world - The Taj Mahal.

== Cast ==
- Pradeep Kumar as Shehzada Khurram / Shah Jahan
- Bina Rai as Arjumand Bano / Mumtaz Mahal
- Rehman as the Mughal Emperor Jahangir
- Jeevan as Shehzada Shahryar
- Veena as Nur Jahan / Mehrunissa
- Jabeen Jalil as Ladli Bano
- Helen as Court Dancer - Song "Na Nare Na Na"

== Music ==
The movie's musical score is by Roshan, lyrics are by Sahir Ludhianvi and most of the songs are performed by Mohammed Rafi and Lata Mangeshkar.

=== Track list ===
No.	Title	Singer	Length
1.	"Jo Baat Tujh Mein Hai"	Mohammed Rafi
2.	"Jo Wada Kiya Wo (Raga Pahadi)"	Mohammed Rafi, Lata Mangeshkar
3.	"Jurm-E-Ulfat Pe (Raga Gaud Malhar)"	Lata Mangeshkar
4.	"Khuda-E-Bartar (Raga Todi)"	Lata Mangeshkar
5.	"Na Na Na Re Na Na, Haath Na Lagana"	Suman Kalyanpur, Minoo Purshottam
6.	"Paaon Chhoo Lene Do"	Mohammed Rafi, Lata Mangeshkar
7.	"Chandi Ka Badan"	Mohammed Rafi, Manna Dey, Asha Bhosle, Meena Kapoor
8.	"Husn Se Duniya Hansi"	Asha Bhosle

== Awards ==
- 1964: Filmfare Award for Best Lyricist: Sahir Ludhianvi
- 1964: Filmfare Award for Best Music Director: Roshan
- 1964: Filmfare Award for Best Female Playback Singer: Lata Mangeshkar for Jo Wada Kiya Wo (nominated)

== See also ==
- Taj Mahal: An Eternal Love Story
