= New Delhi (1956 film) =

1956 Indian Hindi-language comedy film

- Directed by: Mohan Segal
- Written by: Dialogues: Inder Raj Anand; Radha Kishan
- Screenplay by: Inder Raj Anand; Radha Kishan; Mohan Segal
- Story by: Inder Raj Anand; Radha Kishan; Mohan Segal
- Produced by: Mohan Segal
- Starring: Vyjayanthimala; Kishore Kumar; Jabeen Jalil; Nana Palsikar; Nazir Hussain; Dhumal
- Cinematography: K. H. Kapadia
- Edited by: Pratap Dave
- Music by: Shankar Jaikishan
- Production company: De-Lux Films
- Distributed by: De-Lux Films
- Release date: 1956
- Running time: 176 minutes
- Country: India
- Language: Hindi

New Delhi is a 1956 Indian Hindi-language black and white romantic comedy film written by Radhakishen with Inder Raj Anand and directed by Mohan Segal. The film starred Vyjayanthimala and Kishore Kumar in the lead, with Jabeen Jalil, Nana Palsikar, Nazir Hussain, Prabhu Dayal, Dhumal, Brahm Bhardwaj, Radhakrishan, Mumtaz Begum, Mirza Musharraf and Shivraj as the ensemble cast. The film was produced by Mohan Segal himself. The film's score was composed by Shankar Jaikishan duo with lyrics provided by Hasrat Jaipuri and Shailendra, edited by Pratap Dave, and was filmed by K. H. Kapadia. The story is about the Punjabi boy Anand and the Tamil girl Janaki who fall in love with each other, but are unfortunately separated by their families.

== Plot ==
Anand, a Punjabi boy comes from Jalandhar to Delhi, but is unable to find a place to stay, as everywhere he goes people want to give room only to a person of their region. Desperate, Anand masquerades as a Tamilian, Anand Kumaraswamy, and finds a place to stay with a Tamilian family. There, he meets the daughter of the South Indian Cultural Association Head, Janaki (Vyjayantimala). A Romance develops, but Anand is unable to reveal his true identity to her. Daulatram Khanna Nazir Hussain, Anand's father and Janaki's father, Subramanyam's (Nana Palsikar) superior, gets transferred to Delhi. Anand's sister Nikki (Jabeen) comes close to Anand's friend, Ashok Banerjee, a Bengali painter who teaches her art. Anand makes his Tamilian servant Kumaraswamy (Dhoomal) masquerade as his father and they even meet Janaki's father to discuss the marriage. But soon they are found out and Daulatram opposes the marriage. Daulatram also faces opposition from his community who come to discuss Nikki's marriage within the community. Subramanyam too turns against his daughter, who tries to kill herself. She is saved by a kindly shop owner (Radhakishen) and passed off as his Punjabi niece, Mohini. Both Subramanyam and Anand are kept in the dark and are convinced Janaki is no more. Subramanyam realizes his mistake, but sadly he thinks it is too late. Thinking Mohini to be a good Punjabi girl, Anand's family readily agrees to his marriage with her. Daulatram returns home to find Ashok consoling Nikki and throws him out. Nikki's marriage is almost called off when the boy's father demands a huge dowry. Ashok offers his family jewels to Daulatram so that Nikki's marriage can take place. Daulatram's eyes open and he calls off the wedding and marries Nikki to Ashok. The truth about Janaki/ Mohini also comes out and now that both groups have shed their prejudices Anand marries Janaki.

== Cast ==
- Kishore Kumar as Anand D. Khanna / Anand Kumaraswamy
- Vyjayantimala as Janki Subramanian / Mohini
- Jabeen Jalil as Nirmala 'Nikki' D. Khanna
- Prabhu Dayal as Ashok Bannerji
- Nazir Hussain as Lala Daulatram Khanna
- Nana Palsikar as Subramaniam
- Dhumal as Kumar Swami
- Radha Kishan as Sadhuram
- Mumtaz Begum as Daulatram's Wife
- Mirza Musharaf as Daulatram's friend
- Sarita
- Ramlal
- Shamlal
- Bharadwaj as Daulatram's friend
- Mulraj Kapur
- P.R.Kapur
- Sachin Ghosh
- Bingoo
- Sheela Kashmiri
- Shivraj as Chunilal

== Soundtrack ==
The film's soundtrack was composed by Shankar Jaikishan duo while the lyrics were provided by Hasrat Jaipuri and Shailendra.

#	Title	Singer(s)	Lyricist
1	"Nakhrewali"	Kishore Kumar	Shailendra
2	"Milte Hi Nazar"	Kishore Kumar	Shailendra
3	"Are Bhai Nikal Ke Aa Ghar Se"	Kishore Kumar	Shailendra
4	"Koi Mere Sapnon Mein Aaya"	Lata Mangeshkar	Hasrat Jaipuri
5	"Tum Sang Preet Lagai Rasiya"	Lata Mangeshkar	Shailendra
6	"Zindagi Bahar Hai"	Lata Mangeshkar	Shailendra
7	"Bari Barse Khatan Gayan"	Lata Mangehskar	Shailendra
8	"Murli Bairan Bhai"	Lata Mangeshkar	Hasrat Jaipuri
9	"Alarippu"	M. L. Vasanthakumari	Hasrat Jaipuri

== Box office ==
At the end of its theatrical run, the film grossed around ₹1,45,00,000 and netted ₹75,00,000, thus becomes the sixth highest-grossing film of 1956, with a verdict of "hit".

== See also ==
- RG Anand v. Deluxe Films
