= Chaudhary Karnail Singh =

1960 film

- Directed by: Krishan Kumar Chalana
- Written by: Bekal Amritsari
- Produced by: Krishan Kumar Chalana; Mukand Lal Chalana
- Starring: Jagdish Sethi; Prem Chopra; Madan Puri; Jabeen Jalil; Krishna Kumari; Rani Sachdeva
- Cinematography: Roque M. Loyton
- Edited by: Prakash Aggarwal
- Music by: Harbans Papey
- Distributed by: Star of India Pictures
- Release date: 1960
- Country: India
- Language: Punjabi

Chaudhary Karnail Singh is a 1960 Indian Punjabi movie based in the pre-partition times of India. The film was one of the earliest works of Prem Chopra. The film won National Film Award for Best Feature Film in Punjabi.

== Cast ==
- Jagdish Sethi as Chaudhary Karnail Singh
- Prem Chopra as Shera
- Madan Puri as Boota Singh

== Music ==
(1) Pehli Pehli Vaar Asha Bhosle

(2) Harian Pailian Mohammed Rafi, S.Balbir, Asha Bhosle

(3) Pyar Paana Saukha Asha Bhosle,Usha Mangeshkar

(4) Harian Pailian (Bhangra) Asha Bhosle,Mohammed Rafi,Minoo Purshottam

All songs written by Bekel Amritsari
