= Shakila =

- شکیلا
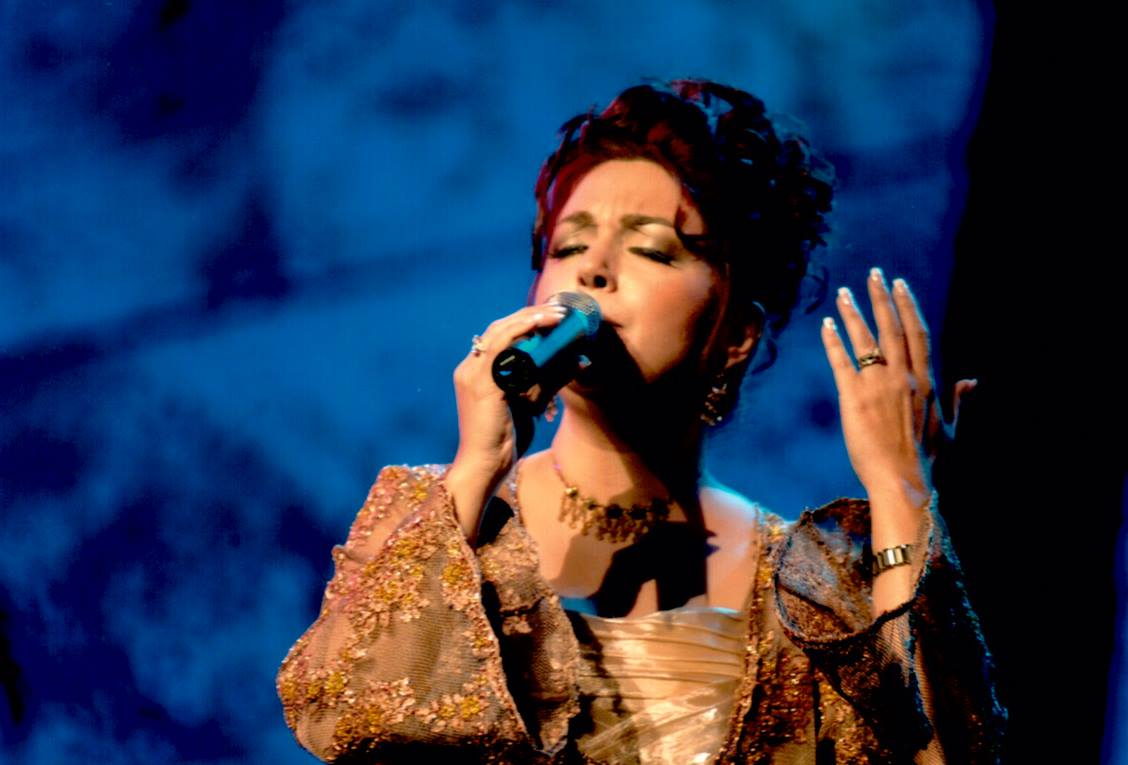
- Shakila in 2017
- Born: Shakila Mohseni Sedaghat; May 3, 1962 (age 64); Tehran, Iran
- Education: Palomar College
- Title: Voting member of Grammy Awards
- Children: 2
- Musical career
- Origin: Iran,
- Genres: Iranian pop; traditional; world
- Occupations: Singer; songwriter
- Years active: 1990–present
- Labels: Caltex Records; Taraneh Enterprises
- Website: shakila.com

Shakila Mohseni Sedaghat (Persian: شکیلا محسنی صداقت, romanized: Šakilā Mohseni Sedāqat), known mononymously as Shakila (Persian: شکیلا, romanized: Šakilā; born May 3, 1962), is an Iranian singer based in San Diego, California. She is an international artist who has performed in various languages including Persian, Kurdish, English, Turkish, Hindi and Spanish. She has won a Persian Music Academy Award in 2006 and a Global Music Award in 2015. Shakila has released over 20 albums in the Persian language as well as many albums in English. She primarily sings about spirituality, love, peace, and awakening. Lyrics of her songs are inspired by Rumi and other major poets. She is also an official voting member at the Grammy Awards.

== Career ==
Shakila started her professional career at the age of nine when she was invited to perform on an Iranian television show.

Later, she moved to San Diego where she studied music at Palomar College. Shakila released her debut album titled Kami Ba Man Modaaraa Kon in 1990. Her second album, Geryeh Dar Ragbar, was released in 1992. In 1993, Shakila signed with Persian record label, Taraneh Records and released her third album Gheybate Noor.

From 1997 to 2008, Shakila was signed with Los Angeles based record label Caltex Records and she released more than eight albums with them. In 2013, Shakila founded her own record label Shakila Enterprises. She has released over ten singles on her record label.

In 2014, Shakila released her single Treasure Within which reached the peak position of No. 1 at various Billboard Charts. Her album 11:11 City of Love was released in 2015. 11:11 City of Love spent more than 43 weeks at No. 1 positions at multiple charts at Billboard. In 2016, Shakila released her album Splashing Tears which also stayed at the peak position of No. 1 at the Billboard charts for several weeks. Shakila has won Persian Music Academy Award in 2006 and Global Music Award in 2015. She has been nominated twice at the Hollywood Music in Media Awards.

== Awards ==
- Persian Music Academy Award- (2006)
- Global Music Awards- (2015)
- Hollywood Music in Media Awards- Nominated Twice
- One World Music Awards- Nominated (2015)

== Discography ==
Album	Tracks	Year
Ey Falak (Single)	1. Ey Falak	1980s
Kami Ba Man Modaaraa Kon	1. Sedaayeh Eshgh; 2. Yegaaneh; 3. Minevisam Az Tou; 4. Kami Baa Man Modaaraa Kon; 5. Entezaar; 6. Nefrin	1990 OR Released: 1993 Pars Video
Geryeh Dar Ragbar	1. Geryeh Dar Ragbaar; 2. Jaan-O-Jahaan; 3. Parsookhtegaan; 4. Ghafas-E-Tang; 5. Baaz Aamadam; 6. Sabz-E-Sabz	Released: 1992 Pars Video
Gheybate Noor	1. Shab; 2. Navaaii; 3. Gohar Noh Sadaf; 4. Gheybateh Noor; 5. Aavaazeh Eshgh; 6. Ghalandar	1993 Taraneh Enterprises Inc
Live in Concert	1. Yegaah; 2. Geryeh Dar Ragbaar; 3. Entezaar; 4. Kami Baa Man; 5. Sedaayeh Eshgh; 6. Baaz Aamadam; 7. Royaa; 8. Gaaneh Gahaan; 9. AAvaazeh Eshgh; 10. Hilat Rahaa Kon; 11. Minevisam; 12. Ghafasehtang; 13. Navaaii	1995
Ākharin Kokab	1. Ākharin Kokab; 2. Del-e Man; 3. Monājāt; 4. Khat-e Sevom; 5. Royā; 6. Tavāf; 7. Khodā Hāfez; 8. Khat-e Sevom (instrumental); 9. Monājāt (instrumental)	Released: 1995
Ersiehaayeh Aatefie	1. Ersiehaayeh Aatefie; 2. Yaar; 3. Aasheghi; 4. Ghanaari; 5. Baza; 6. Sanama; 7. Zendegie; 8. Ghanaari(Instrumental)	Released: Apr 24, 1997 Caltex Records
Zabaaneh Negaah	1. Zabaaneh Negaah; 2. Peer Farzandeh; 3. Darvish; 4. Delijaan-E-Eshgh; 5. Morghak-E-Khiaal; 6. Ey Zendegi; 7. Ghoaam Be Haj Rafteh	Released: Jan 13, 1999 Caltex Records
Ashke Mahtab	1. Del Majnoon; 2. Mabood; 3. Ashke Mahtab; 4. Nimeh-Hoshyar; 5. Ghame Yar; 6. Vadi Eshgh; 7. Bani Alam	Released: Mar.01.2000 Caltex Records
Aava	1. Morgh-E-Sahar; 2. Tak Derakht; 3. Setaregan; 4. Bidad-E-Zaman; 5. Rosvaye Zamaneh; 6. Ashofteh Hali; 7. Soghati	Released: Apr.01.2001 Caltex Records
Live in Concert	1. Ersieh; 2. Biyar Maeem; 3. Kami Ba Man Modara Kon; 4. Baza; 5. Zendegi; 6. Ghoghayeh Setaregan; 7. Morghake Khiyal; 8. Zabane Negah; 9. Morghe Sahar; 10. Ghame Yar; 11. Ghome Be Haj Rafteh; 12. Tak Derakhti & Bibade Zaman; 13. Navaie	2001
Ansooye Bi-su	1. Az toh 2. Rasmeh Zamooneh; 3. Aan Sooyeh Bisoo; 4. Khashm Makon; 5. Nooreh Khodaa; 6. Bahaareh Delkash; 7. Charkheh Gardoon	Released: May.01.2002 Caltex Records
Jadouye Sokout	1. Shah'e Mani; 2. Nemidanam; 3. Keras Kordi; 4. Jadouy'e Sokout; 5. Ya' Mohammad Ya'Ali; 6. Ey Esheghan	Released: Feb.10.2004 Caltex Records
Labe Khaamoush	1. Labe Khamoush; 2. Saburi; 3. Dar in Donya; 4. Safar; 5. Souratgare Naghash; 6. Ahouye Vahshi; 7. Ey Eshgh; 8. Souratgare Naghash (Inst.)	Released: Oct 31, 2005 Caltex Records
Sho'leye Bidaar	1. Jahaane asheghaan 2. Shabe entezaar 3. Kooche; 4. Sho'leye Bidaar; 5. Gole bi bahaar 6. Faryaad; 7. Ramide	Released: Jan 31, 2008 Caltex Records
Mojdey e Azadi	1. Mojdeye Azadi; 2. Nedaye Mardome Iran; 3. Ariyaei Nejad; 4. Yeki Shodan; 5. Armeniyen Folk Medly; 6. Medly of Old Songs; 7. Vaghte Paridan; 8. Norouz	Released: Dec 15, 2009 Art & Shakila Productions
Fereshteh Baanu	1. Maeshough; 2. Fereshteh Baanu; 3. Shekanjeh Gar; 4. Rahaa Kon Naaz; 5. Le Yaareh; 6. Jaan-E-Jahaan; 7. Geryeh Nakon; 8. Che Khaahad Shod	Released: Dec 21, 2012 Taraneh Enterprises Inc
Shahzadeye Royaye Man	1. Shahzadeye Royaye Man	Released: Dec 13, 2013 Shakila Enterprises
El Corazon	1. El Corazon	Released: Nov.11.2013 Shakila Enterprises
Fall Away	1. Fall Away	Released: Nov.12.2013 Shakila Enterprises
X Mass (War is Over Angelic Version	1. X Mass Was is over Angelic Version	Released: Dec.06.2013 Shakila Enterprises
Hasrat	1. Hasrat	Released: Dec.16.2013 Shakila Enterprises
Treasure Within – Ganje Nahan	1. Ganje Nahan Treasure Within	Released: Jan.20.2014 Shakila Enterprises
Delhore	1. Delhore	Released: Mar.20.2014 Shakila Enterprises
Saghfe Shekasteh	1. Saghfe Shekasteh	Released: May.14.2014 Shakila Enterprises
Only You	1. Only You	Released: Aug.14.2014 Shakila Enterprises
Pledge for Peace	1. Pledge for Peace	Released: Sept.10.2014 Shakila Enterprises
Raftam Mara bebakhsh	1. Raftam Mara bebakhsh	Released: 2015 Shakila Enterprises
Minevisam & Modara Dance Medley	1. Minevisam & Modara Dance Medley1	Released: 2015 Shakila Enterprises
My Light Valentine's MAXI Single	1. My Light Radio Version; 2. My Light Full Version	Released: 2015 Shakila Enterprises
11:11 City of love	1. If you distance your self 2. City of love 3. When I close my eyes 4. Pledge for peace "Original"; 5. My heart 6. Teach hate how to love again 7. Pledge for peace "Piano mix" 8. The Secret (New Age); 9. Power of NOW! (World Instrumental); 10. Na tum hamein jaano (Indian EDM); 11. Baraftou (Persian Folk)	Released:2015 Shakila Enterprises
Ganje Nahan	1. Hasrat; 2. Shahzadeye Royaye Man; 3. Baraftou; 4. Saghfe Shekasteh; 5. Bi Sarzamin; 6. Delhore; 7. Bi Sarzamin; 8. Ganje Nahan	Released:2015 Shakila Enterprises
Habse Khanegi	1. Habse Khanegi	Released:2016 Shakila Enterprises
Hadise Ashenaie Remix	1. Hadise Ashenaie "Remix"	Released:2016 Shakila Enterprises
Peyk Sahari	1. Peyk Sahari	Released:2016 Shakila Enterprises
Splashing Tears	1. Splashing Tears Radio Original version 2. Splashing Tears Rap version	Released:2016

== See also ==
- Persian traditional music
- List of famous Persian women
