= Sheela (1935 film) =

1935 film

Sheela aka Pind Di Kurhi
- Directed by: K. D. Mehra
- Produced by: Indira Movie Tone
- Starring: Noor Jehan; Mubarak; Pushpa Rani; Haidar Bandi; Eidan Bai
- Music by: Mubarak Ali Khan; K. D. Mehra
- Release date: 1935 (British India)
- Country: India
- Language: Punjabi

Sheela (Punjabi: ਸ਼ੀਲਾ), also known as Pind Di Kurhi (Punjabi: ਪਿੰਡ ਦੀ ਕੁੜੀ), sometimes spelled as Pind Di Kurri or Sheila, is a 1935 Indian Punjabi film directed by K.D. Mehra.

It is the first Punjabi language film with sound and was made in Calcutta and released in Lahore, British India.

According to British Film Institute website, "In 1935, Noor Jehan traveled to Calcutta with her sister Eidan, cousin Haider Bandi and brother Shafi. Calcutta was an important centre for films...." back in 1935.

Mubarak Ali Khan and K.D. Mehra composed the music. Baby Noor Jehan (1926–2000), at age 8 or 9, was for the first time introduced as an actress and singer.

== Cast ==
- Nawab Begum as Sheila/Pind Di Kurri
- Baby Noor Jehan as Paro
- Mubarak
- Pushpa Rani
- Haider Bandi
- Eidan Bai
- K. L. Rajpal as Kidar
- Nawazish Ali as Kidar's father
- A. R. Kashmiri as Dollah
- Bawa Rahim Bux as Taya

== Popular film songs ==
Song title	Sung by	Lyrics by	Music by	Film notes
Lang Aaja Pattan Chena Daa, O' Yaar	Noor Jehan	Traditional Punjabi folk song	Mubarak Ali Khan	Noor Jehan's (1926–2000) first recorded film song as a child actress and singer in Calcutta in 1935. This film was made in Calcutta and then released in Lahore, British India.

== See also ==
- Heer Ranjha first Punjabi feature film in 1932 directed by Abdur Rashid Kardar.
