= Aape Pein Siyaape =

2023 Indian Hindi-language film

- Directed by: Sharhaan Singh
- Screenplay by: Sharhaan Singh
- Produced by: Sharhaan Singh
- Starring: Sharhaan Singh; Rajesh Sharma; Aditi Aarya
- Cinematography: Raju Gogna; Gagan Sarao
- Edited by: Rahul Singh
- Music by: Gurcharan Singh
- Distributed by: Zee Studios
- Release date: 26 February 2021
- Country: India
- Language: Punjabi

Aape Pein Siyaape is a 2021 Indian Punjabi-language film, written, produced and directed by Sharhaan Singh. The film stars Rajesh Sharma, Sharhaan Singh, Amandeep Singh, Lakha Lakhwinder Singh, Sabby Suri, Aditi Aarya in lead roles.

== Synopsis ==
Three boys- Bunny Singh Dhillon, Mithu Sekoon, and Varinder Bagga- try to sort out their issues in life. Bunny is generally unhappy in life, Lakhwinder wishes to marry Simmy Singh, and Varinder wants to become a Punjabi actor. Unfortunately, due to a lack of money, they all have to resort to crime to get by.

== Cast ==
- Rajesh Sharma as Sardar Ji
- Aditi Aarya as Simmy Singh
- Amandeep Singh as Varinder Bagga
- Sharhaan Singh as Bunny Singh Dhillon
- Lakha Lakhwinder Singh as Mithu Sekoon
- Sabby Suri
- Ravi Aneja
- Aman Kotish

== Filming ==
The film is mostly shot in Chandigarh, Punjabi and Mumbai, Maharashtra, India.

== Soundtrack ==
Aape Pein Siyaape

Soundtrack album by Gurcharan Singh
- Released: 26 February 2021
- Recorded: 202-2021
- Genre: Feature film soundtrack
- Length: 2:01
- Language: Punjabi
External audio
- Video on YouTube

The music of the film is composed by Gurcharan Singh and sung by Ab Bobby.

No.	Title	Lyrics	Music	Length
1.	"Aape Pein Siyaape"	Gurcharan Singh	Gurcharan Singh
Total length:				2:01

== See also ==
- Official Trailer Video on YouTube
