= Krishna Kalle =

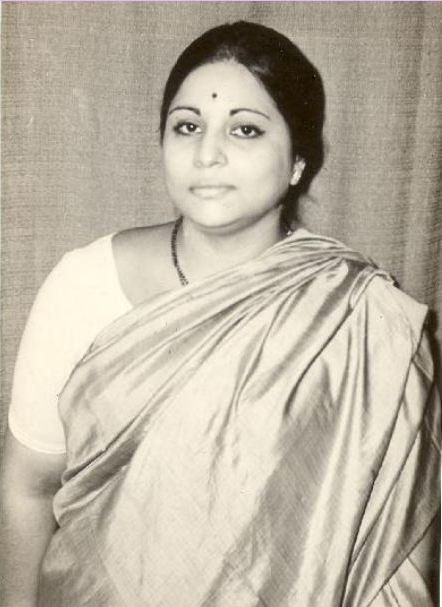

Background information
- Born: 18 December 1940; Karwar, Uttara Kannada, Karnataka, India
- Died: 15 March 2015 (aged 74) Mumbai, Maharashtra, India
- Occupation: Singer

Krishna Kalle (Kannada: ಕೃಷ್ಣಾ ಕಲ್ಲೆ; 18 December 1940 – 15 March 2015) was an Indian playback singer in Marathi, Hindi, and Kannada films.

== Childhood ==
Kalle's family was from Karwar, Uttara Kannada. She was born and grew up in Kanpur, where her father was employed. At the age of 16, she began singing over the Kanpur station of All India Radio (AIR) and at stage performances in Uttar Pradesh, the state where Kanpur is located.

== Career ==
When Kalle came to Mumbai to visit relatives, the singer Arun Date happened to hear her sing. Impressed, he introduced her to music director Yashwant Deo, who was then employed at the Bombay station of AIR. Deo composed a Marathi song that Kalle recorded, man pisaat majhe. The song proved popular and started her journey as a Marathi singer. The next two songs she recorded, parikathetil raajakumaaraa and uuTh sha.nkaraa soD samaadhii, also were very well received. From 1960 onwards, she began broadcasting regularly over AIR as an 'A' graded artist.

She was also active in the film industry for about a decade from 1960s to the 1970s. She sang around 200 Bollywood songs, 100 Marathi movie songs, 2 Kannada film songs and in punjabi movies Kade Dhupp Kade Chhaan(1967), Kankan De Ohle (1971) and 100 bhajans, ghazals, and devotional songs.

== Death ==
She died on 15 March 2015 after a brief illness in Mumbai, aged 74. She had been hospitalized about a month earlier following a stroke, and had been released from the hospital eight days prior to her death.

== Awards ==
- 1957: National Youth Singing Award
- 1958: First prize, All India Sugam Sangeet Award
- 1958: K.L. Saigal Memorial Award
- 1965: Golden Voice of India prize
- 2014: Maharashtra government Lata Mangeshkar Award for Lifetime Achievement.

== Famous songs in Hindi ==
1. "Ajab Teri Karigari Re Kartar" (with Mohammed Rafi, Dus Lakh, 1966)
2. "Sochta Hoon Ke Tumhe Maine Kahin Dekha Hai" (with Mohammed Rafi, Raaz, 1967)
3. "Chakkar Chalaye Ghanchakkar" (Do Dooni Char, 1968).
4. "Meri Hasraton Ki Duniya" (Gaal Gulabi Nain Sharabi, 1974)
5. "Main Kesar Kasturi" (Chhote Sarkaar, 1974)

== Famous songs in Marathi ==
1. परिकथेतील राजकुमारा (parikathetil raajakumaaraa)
2. मन पिसाट माझे अडले रे (man pisaaT maajhe)
3. मैनाराणी चतुर शहाणी (mainaaraaNii chatur shahaaNii)
4. गोडगोजिरी लाज लाजरी (godagojirii laaj laajarii)
5. कामापुरता मामा (kaamaapurataa maamaa)
6. ऊठ शंकरा, सोड समाधी (uuTh sha.nkaraa, sod samaadhii)
7. बिब्बं घ्या बिब्बं (Biba Ghya Biba)

== Kannada songs ==
1. "ಒಂದೊಂದಾಗಿ ಜಾರಿದರೆ" ("ondondagi jaaridare", "Kalpavruksha", 1969)
2. "ಜಯತೆ ಜಯತೆ" ("jayate jayate", with Manna Dey and Ambar Kumar, "Kalpavruksha", 1969)
