= List of Punjabi films of the 2010s =

This is a list of Panjabi films of the 2010s. For a complete alphabetical list, see Category:Punjabi films.
