= Ravindra Kapoor =

Indian character actor

- Born: Gujranwala, Punjab, British India
- Died: 14 August 2011; Mumbai, Maharashtra, India
- Occupation: Actor
- Relatives: Kamal Kapoor (brother); Prithviraj Kapoor (first-cousin); Kapil Kapoor (nephew)
- Family: Kapoor family; Behl family

Ravindra Kapoor was an Indian character actor in Hindi and Punjabi language films. He was the brother of Nandkishore Kapoor and veteran actor Kamal Kapoor.

== Career ==
Some of his popular films are Caravan in 1971 where he played veteran actor Jeetendra's friend along with Hum Kisise Kum Naheen (1977), Kankan De Ohle (1970) and Jo Jeeta Wohi Sikandar (1992).

== Filmography ==
Year	Film	Character/Role
1991	Benaam Badsha	
1988	Qayamat Se Qayamat Tak	Dharampal Singh
1985	Zabardast	Dilawar Khan (as Ravinder Kapoor)
1985	Hum Dono	Dr. Kapoor
1984	Hum Rahe Na Hum	
1984	Manzil Manzil	Guest Appearance) (as Ravinder Kapoor)
1984	Hum Hain Lajawaab	John Pascal (as Ravinder Kapoor)
1984	Aan Aur Shaan	Chhote Thakur
1982	Dulha Bikta Hai	Anwar
1982	Star	Charlie
1982	Khud-Daar	Sikh Taxi Driver (as Ravinder Kapoor)
1981	Naari	Ajit / Ajju
1980	The Burning Train	Sikh Passenger
1977	Agent Vinod	
1977	Hum Kisise Kum Naheen	Prakash (as Ravinder Kapoor)
1977	Chhailla Babu	Chitku's brother (as Ravinder Kapoor)
1975	Aakraman	Subedar Usman (as Ravinder Kapoor)
1974	Madhosh	(uncredited)
1974	Majboor	Street Dancer Singer (as Ravinder Kapoor)
1974	Dost	Shyamal (as Ravinder Kapoor)
1973	Insaaf	Raju
1973	Yaadon Ki Baaraat	Usman Bhai Butliwala (as Ravinder Kapoor)
1973	Sherni	
1971	Caravan	Johny (as Ravinder Kapoor)
1970	Kankan De Ohle	Madan
1969	Aya Sawan Jhoom Ke	Rajesh (as Ravinder Kapoor)
1969	Dupatta	Rajoo
1969	Mukhra Chan Warga	
1969	Paun Baran	
1968	Punjabi Munda	
1967	Diwana	Inder Singh
1967	Pind De Kuri (as Ravinder Kapoor)	
1967	Khed Preetan Di	
1967	Neem Hakeem	
1966	Kunwari	
1966	Gabroo Desh Punjab De	
1966	Laiye Tod Nibhaiye	Kishen
1965	Shokan Mele Di	
1964	Saat Saliyan	
1963	Mere Haniyan	
1961	Ek Ladki Saat Ladke	
1960	CHAMBE DI KALI	as Raju
1959	Khoobsurat Dhokha	
1959	Maine Jeena Seekh Liya	
1959	Pardesi Dhola	
1958	Sun To Le Hasina	
1957	Paisa	
1953	Thokar	

=== Television ===
Junoon as Thakur Diwan (From Episode no 1 to 7)
