= Kankan De Ohle =

1971 film

- Directed by: Omi Bedi
- Produced by: Jagdish Gargi
- Starring: Ravinder Kapoor; Indira; Jeevan; Uma Dutt; Mumtaz Begum; Anwar Hussain; Dharmendra; Asha Parekh
- Music by: Sapan Jagmohan
- Release date: 1971
- Running time: 145 minutes
- Country: India
- Language: Punjabi

Kankan De Ohle is a 1971 Punjabi film directed by Omi Bedi, starring Ravinder Kapoor, Indira, Jeevan, Uma Dutt, Mumtaz Begum and others with the guest appearance of Dharmendra and Asha Parekh.

Sapan Jagmohan is the music director and the playback singers include Mohammad Rafi, Asha Bhosle, Usha Timothy, Bhupinder and Balbir.

== Plot ==
Kankan De Ohle depicts a test of will and honesty of a person, Chaudhary, who takes on an identity of a bandit to save the marriage of his friend's daughter, and is sent to jail. Taking him to be wrong, the villagers throw out his wife and son, Madan. Madan grows up without knowing his father and becomes the darling of the little village. He is determined to free the villagers from an evil money-lender, Ramu Shah, and for this he seeks help from his friend Banta Singh.

== Cast ==
Actor/Actress	Role
Dharmendra	Banta Singh
Asha Parekh	Nikki
Ravindra Kapoor	Madan
Indira	Nimmo
Jeevan	Ramu Shah
Uma Dutt	Chaudhary Kartar Singh (Madan's father)
Khairati	Chaanan Mal
Mumtaz Begum	Madan's mother
Anwar Hussain	Bandit Kartar Singh aka Kartara Daku

== Music ==
All film song lyrics are by Naqsh Lyallpuri, music by Sapan Jagmohan.

1. "Sauray aake jind rul gai" - Krishna Kalle
2. "Rabba Ve Teriyan Be Par Vaahian" - Mohammed Rafi
3. "Chambe Diye Dale Ni" - Mohammed Rafi
4. "Dil Maithon Mangda" - Asha Bhosle
5. "Niki Niki Gale Tusi Kyon Russ Gaye" -Bhupinder Singh, Asha Bhosle
6. "Hai Ne Main Sadke" - Mohammed Rafi
7. "Pehlan Te Bole Haas Haas Ke" - S.Balbir
8. "Kankan De Ohle, Ohle Nachdi Phire Morni" - Mohammed Rafi, Usha Timothi, Chorus
