= Jabeen Jalil =

Former Indian actress (born 1937)

- Born: 1 April 1937 (age 89); Delhi, India
- Occupation: Actress
- Years active: 1953–1974
- Spouse: Ashok Kak (m. 1968)
- Children: 1
- Awards: National Film Award for Best Actress for Chaudhary Karnail Singh (1960)

Jabeen Jalil (born April 1, 1937) is a former Indian actress. In a two decade-long career, she appeared in 23 Hindi and 4 Punjabi films. Her notable works include New Delhi (1956), Chaudhary Karnail Singh (1960)—which won her the National Film Award for Best Actress—and Taj Mahal (1963).

== Early life ==
Jalil was born in a Sayyid Muslim family on 1 April 1937. Her father Sayyad Abu Ahmed Jaleel was a Bengali I.C.S. officer during the British Raj, while her mother Dilaara Jaleel was a homemaker who came from a Lahore-based family.

== Career ==
Jalil was discovered by actors Nigar Sultana and Dilip Kumar who were the guests in her college's cultural function; they suggested her to pursue a career in acting.

Jalil made her acting debut with a leading role in Raat Ke Rahi (1953), opposite Shammi Kapoor. She went on to play supporting characters in successful films such as New Delhi (1956) and Taj Mahal (1963). In 1960, she won the National Film Award for Best Actress for her performance in the Punjabi film Chaudhary Karnail Singh (1960), in which she was paired with Prem Chopra. Jalil's last appearance was in Vachan (1974).

== Personal life ==
Jalil married Ashok Kak, a Kashmiri Pandit, in 1968. Their son Divvij Kak is also an actor.

== Partial filmography ==
Year	Title	Role	Language	Notes
1954	Guzaara		Hindi	Debut film
1955	Lutera		Hindi	
1956	New Delhi	Nirmala	Hindi	
1956	Char Minar		Hindi	
1956	Qeemat		Hindi	
1957	Jeevan Saathi		Hindi	
1957	Fashion		Hindi	
1958	Raagini	Raagini	Hindi	
1958	Hathkadi		Hindi	
1958	Panchayat		Hindi	
1959	Bedard Zamana Kya Jaane		Hindi	
1959	Raat Ke Rahi		Hindi	
1960	Chaudhary Karnail Singh		Punjabi	
1961	Batwara		Hindi	
1961	Khiladi		Hindi	
1962	Jadugar Daku		Hindi	
1962	Sachche Moti		Hindi	
1963	Taj Mahal	Ladli Bano	Hindi	
1963	Zingaro		Hindi	
1963	The Householder	Uncredited Role	Hindi/English	
1963	Aeh Dharti Punjab Di		Punjabi	
1964	Geet Baharan De		Punjabi	
1967	Ghar Ka Chirag		Hindi	
1967	Rajoo		Hindi	
1967	Kade Dhupp Kade Chhaan		Punjabi	
1974	Vachan		Hindi	
