= Minoo Purshottam =

Indian playback singer (born 1944)

Minoo Purushottam
- Born: 20 November 1944 (age 81); Patiala, Punjab, India
- Occupation: Playback singer
- Years active: 1963-present

Minoo Purshottam is an Indian playback singer who sang Bollywood songs, and was most popular during the 1960s and 1970s.

== Career ==
Minoo Purshottam's career started in 1963 when she was 16. The composer Roshan offered her a singing role in the film Taj Mahal. The song eventually became a duet with Suman Kalyanpur.

== Awards ==
| Year | Award | Song | Film | Result |
|---|---|---|---|---|
| 1974 | Filmfare Award for Best Female Playback Singer | "Raat Piya Ke Sang" | Prem Parvat | Nominated |

== Popular songs ==
| Song | Film | Co-singer |
|---|---|---|
| "Dekho Ji Ek Bala" | China Town (1962) | Mohammed Rafi |
| "Unse Nazrein Mili" | Gazal (1964) | Lata Mangeshkar |
| "Ni Main Yaar Manana Ni" | Daag (1973) | Lata Mangeshkar |
| "Hath Na Lagana" | Taj Mahal (1963) | Suman Kalyanpur |
| "Huzurewala Jo Ho Ijaazat" | Yeh Raat Phir Na Aaygi (1966) | Asha Bhosle |
| "Raat Piya Ke Sang Jaagi Re Sakhi" | Prem Parbat (1973) | |
| "Jaanewalon Idhar Dekho" | Badla (1974) | Asha Bhosle |
| "Durga Hai Meri Maa" | Kranti (1981) | Mahendra Kapoor |

== Discography ==
- Minoo purshottam ranj mein raahat (1980)
- Rehguzar Ghazals (1981)
