= 52nd National Film Awards =

2005 Indian film award

- Awarded for: Best of Indian cinema in 2004
- Awarded by: Directorate of Film Festivals
- Presented by: A. P. J. Abdul Kalam (President of India)
- Announced on: 13 July 2005
- Presented on: 21 October 2005
- Site: Vigyan Bhavan, New Delhi
- Official website: dff.nic.in

Highlights
- Best Feature Film: Page 3
- Best Non-Feature Film: Girni
- Best Book: Stardust: Vignettes from the Fringes of Film Industry
- Best Film Critic: Namrata Joshi
- Dadasaheb Phalke Award: Adoor Gopalakrishnan
- Most awards: • Autograph • Page 3 (3)

The 52nd National Film Awards, presented by Directorate of Film Festivals, the organisation set up by Ministry of Information and Broadcasting, India to felicitate the best of Indian Cinema released in the year 2004.

The selection process of 52nd National Film Awards began with the constitution of three Juries for feature film, non-feature film and best writing on cinema sections. The filmmaker Sudhir Mishra headed the feature film Jury, which had sixteen other members. Cinematographer and Director A. K. Bir headed the seven-member non-feature film Jury. The Jury for best writing on cinema was headed by veteran film critic and former editor of Screen and Filmfare from Mumbai, Rauf Ahmed.

Awards were announced by each committee chairpersons on 13 July 2005. Award ceremony took place at Vigyan Bhavan, New Delhi on 21 October 2005 and awards were given by then President of India, Dr. A. P. J. Abdul Kalam.

For 52nd National Film Awards, 107 feature films participated along with 118 non-feature films and 22 books on cinema in 9 Indian languages.

== Awards ==
Awards were divided into feature films, non-feature films and books written on Indian cinema.

=== Lifetime Achievement Award ===
Name of Award	Image	Awardee(s)	Awarded As	Awards
Dadasaheb Phalke Award		Adoor Gopalakrishnan	director	Swarna Kamal, ₹ 200,000 and a Shawl

=== Feature films ===
Feature films were awarded at All India as well as regional level. For 52nd National Film Awards, a Hindi film, Page 3 won the National Film Award for Best Feature Film also winning the maximum number of awards (3), along with a Tamil film, Autograph. Following were the awards given in each category:

==== Juries ====
A committee headed by Sudhir Mishra was appointed to evaluate the feature films awards. Following were the jury members:

- Jury Members
  - Sudhir Mishra (Chairperson) • Preeti Sagar • Vanisri • Satabdi Roy • L. Vaidyanathan • Sandeep Sawant • Subhadro Chaudhury • Chandi Mukherjee
  - Sharad Dutt • Bhajan Sopori • T. S. Nagabharana • Nagesh Kukunoor • Ranjeet Das • M. Sanjeev • M. Mohan • Vinod Ganatra • Vasantha S. M. A.

==== All India Award ====
Following were the awards given:

===== Golden Lotus Award =====
Official Name: Swarna Kamal

All the awardees are awarded with 'Golden Lotus Award (Swarna Kamal)', a certificate and cash prize.

Name of Award	Name of Film	Language	Awardee(s)	Cash prize
Best Feature Film	Page 3	Hindi	Producer: Bobby Pushkarna director: Madhur Bhandarkar	₹ 50,000/- Each
Best Feature Film	Citation: For a complex and daring attempt which exposes the shallow world of Page 3 in a manner which is both savagely satirical yet gently ironical.			
Best Debut Film of a Director	Grahanam	Telugu	Producer: N. Anji Reddy; Director: Mohan Krishna Indraganti	₹ 25,000/- Each
Best Debut Film of a Director	Citation: For invoking nostalgia in a manner that is powerful yet poetic.			
Best Popular Film Providing Wholesome Entertainment	Veer-Zaara	Hindi	Producer: Yash Raj Films; Director: Yash Chopra	₹ 20,000/- Each
Best Popular Film Providing Wholesome Entertainment	Citation: For invoking a touching tale of love highlighting the importance of human relationship above man-made boundaries.			
Best Popular Film Providing Wholesome Entertainment	Autograph	Tamil	Producer: Cheran; Director: Cheran	₹ 20,000/- Each
Best Popular Film Providing Wholesome Entertainment	Citation: For invoking nostalgia in a manner that is powerful yet poetic.			
Best Children's Film	Chutkan Ki Mahabharat	Hindi	Producer: Children's Film Society; Director: Sankalp Meshram	₹ 30,000/- Each
Best Children's Film	Citation: The film is phantasanagonic story of a boy whose dreams start coming true suddenly. All hell breaks loose when a Nautanki comes to village to play Mahabharata and suddenly its story changes. The warring Kaurvas and Pandavas bury their differences and become friends even before the war has begun.			
Best Direction	Swapner Din	Bengali	Buddhadeb Dasgupta	₹ 50,000/-
Best Direction	Citation: For his appropriate usage of metaphors and complex handling of socio political situation present in West Bengal in a language simultaneously cinematic and poetic.			

===== Silver Lotus Award =====
Official Name: Rajat Kamal

All the awardees are awarded with 'Silver Lotus Award (Rajat Kamal)', a certificate and cash prize.

Name of Award	Name of Film	Language	Awardee(s)	Cash prize
Best Feature Film on National Integration	Netaji Subhas Chandra Bose: The Forgotten Hero	Hindi	Producer: Sahara India Media Communication Ltd. Director: Shyam Benegal	₹ 30,000/- Each
Best Feature Film on National Integration	Citation: Netaji is one of the most controversial and colourful figures of modern Indian history. His struggle to fight the Britishers and bring the Indians together to do this. The idealistic dreamer turns into a revolutionary to achieve his goal. The film effectively brings alive the era.			
Best Film on Family Welfare	Hasina	Kannada	Producer: Chiguru Chitra; Director: Girish Kasaravalli	₹ 30,000/- Each
Best Film on Family Welfare	Citation: The film deals with a social evil of family planning in a Muslim community. The story of women and her children deserted by a drunkard husband is handled in a unique and subtle way.			
Best Film on Other Social Issues	Perumazhakkalam	Malayalam	Producer: Salim Padiyath; Director: Kamal	₹ 30,000/- Each
Best Film on Other Social Issues	Citation: For its deft handling of a complex, sensitive issue in a very sensitive manner. The central characters in the film reflect the traditional virtues of the Indian women, such as self-sacrifice, endurance and forgiveness, to bring two communities together.			
Best Film on Environment / Conservation / Preservation	Devrai	Marathi	Producer: Y. N. Oak	₹ 30,000/-
Best Film on Environment / Conservation / Preservation	Devrai	Marathi	Director: Sumitra Bhave and Sunil Sukthankar	₹ 15,000/- Each
Best Film on Environment / Conservation / Preservation	Citation: In this chaotic world, when every body talks about the importance of environment, conservation and preservation but no body cares to learn from the wisdom of myth created by our forefathers and create a space for every mind to realise its potential without judging, discriminating or condemning.			
Best Actor	Hum Tum	Hindi	Saif Ali Khan	₹ 10,000/-
Best Actor	Citation: For his sheer ease, subtlety and spontaneity in portraying a complex and demanding role.			
Best Actress	Hasina	Kannada	Thaara	₹ 10,000/-
Best Actress	Citation: For her powerful portrayal of a young Muslim wife boldly questioning the traditional laws of her community. Her ability to convey the range of various moods through her performance in a forceful manner is appreciated.			
Best Supporting Actor	Krantikaal	Bengali	Haradhan Bandopadhyay	₹ 10,000/-
Best Supporting Actor	Citation: For his subtle yet powerful performance which is understated portraying a helpless bedridden old royal.			
Best Supporting Actress	Akale	Malayalam	Sheela	₹ 10,000/-
Best Supporting Actress	Citation: For the grace with which she handles the tragedy of a community that is slowly fading away.			
Best Child Artist	Chhota Sipahi	Hindi	Om Bhutkar	₹ 10,000/-
Best Child Artist	Citation: For his gradual evolution from a naïve innocent young child to a patriot in the liberation movement of Goa.			
Best Male Playback Singer	Swades ("Yeh Taara Woh Taara")	Hindi	Udit Narayan	₹ 10,000/-
Best Male Playback Singer	Citation: For the song to honour his soulful rendition of this beautiful Rahman melody with imaging modulation.			
Best Female Playback Singer	Autograph ("Ovvoru Pookalume")	Tamil	K. S. Chithra	₹ 10,000/-
Best Female Playback Singer	Citation: For expressive and soulful rendition of the song with powerful voice throw suitable to the text and the scene.			
Best Cinematography	Swades	Hindi	Cameraman: Mahesh Aney; Laboratory Processing: Adlabs	₹ 15,000/-
Best Cinematography	Citation: For his lens that captures the rural Indian landscape with reality and harshness.			
Best Screenplay	Page 3	Hindi	• Manoj Tyagi • Nina Arora	₹ 10,000/-
Best Screenplay	Citation: For telling a complex story in a stunningly simple manner. It takes you into the empty shallow world of Page 3, in a manner which is funny yet deeply empathetic.			
Best Audiography	Iti Srikanta	Bengali	Anup Mukhopadhyay	₹ 10,000/-
Best Audiography	Citation: For finest recordings of the sound in a superb way that lends an extra dimension to the film.			
Best Editing	Page 3	Hindi	Suresh Pai	₹ 10,000/-
Best Editing	Citation: For the crisp cutting which gives a finesse to the film and the successfully sustains the tempo of the film and mood and emotion while never losing the narrative.			
Best Art Direction	Netaji Subhas Chandra Bose: The Forgotten Hero	Hindi	Samir Chanda	₹ 10,000/-
Best Art Direction	Citation: For effectively recreating the period prior to the second world war across nations.			
Best Costume Design	Hasina	Kannada	• Ishrath Nissar • M. N. Swamy	₹ 10,000/-
Best Costume Design	Citation: For the costumes that lent a realistic feel to the characters thereby adding to their credibility.			
Best Music Direction	Swarabhishekam	Telugu	Songs and Background Score: Vidyasagar	₹ 10,000/-
Best Music Direction	Citation: For the songs that are composed as per the situation and enrich the theme of the film. From the beginning to the end he has maintained traditional classical music and used Indian acoustic instruments thus bringing out the colour and flavor of Indian music.			
Best Lyrics	Autograph ("Ovvoru Pookalume")	Tamil	P. Vijay	₹ 10,000/-
Best Lyrics	Citation: For or meaningful and powerful lyrics generating hope for a better future.			
Best Special Effects	Anji	Telugu	Sanath (Fire Fly Digital)	₹ 10,000/-
Best Special Effects	Citation: For imaginative and effective creation of an outside world using special effects.			
Best Choreography	Lakshya ("Main Aisa Kyu Hoon")	Hindi	Prabhu Deva	₹ 10,000/-
Best Choreography	Citation: For his imaginative, spectacular and rhythmic dance composition.			
Special Jury Award	Dancer	Tamil	J. Phillip (Actor)	₹ 25,000/-
Special Jury Award	Citation: For his incredible acting and dance performance despite being a physically challenged person.			
Special Mention	Des Hoyaa Pardes	Punjabi	Gurdas Maan (Actor)	Certificate Only
Special Mention	Citation: For an effective portrayal of an innocent, helpless, patriotic young Punjabi landlord caught in crossfire between terrorists and the police.			Certificate Only
Special Mention	Oridam	Malayalam	Pradeep Nair (Director)	Certificate Only
Special Mention	Citation: For his credible attempt at creating a new imagery and effective cinematic language in his debut film.			Certificate Only

==== Regional Awards ====
The award is given to best film in the regional languages in India.

Name of Award	Name of Film	Awardee(s)	Cash prize
Best Feature Film in Assamese	Dinabandhoo	Producer: Krishna Roy; Director: Munin Barua	₹ 20,000/- Each
Best Feature Film in Assamese	Citation: For a human struggle against circumstances, mainly because of dowry as well as social status.		
Best Feature Film in Bengali	Krantikaal	Producer: Shampa Bhattacharjee; Director: Sekhar Das	₹ 20,000/- Each
Best Feature Film in Bengali	Citation: For dialectical portrayal of a terrorist’s critical encounter with a decadent Bengali royal culture trapped in a time wrap.		
Best Feature Film in Hindi	Raincoat	Producer: Shree Venkatesh Films; Director: Rituparno Ghosh	₹ 20,000/- Each
Best Feature Film in Hindi	Citation: For its subtle handling of human relationship in a low-keyed fashion yet mentioning the warmth of a lost love.		
Best Feature Film in Kannada	Beru	Producer: Mitrachitra; Director: P. Sheshadri	₹ 20,000/- Each
Best Feature Film in Kannada	Citation: For critical analysis of bureaucratic corruption through the eyes of a folk dancer and its ironic overtone.		
Best Feature Film in Konkani	Aleesha	Producer: Rajendra Talak Creations; Director: Rajendra Talak	₹ 20,000/- Each
Best Feature Film in Konkani	Citation: For its concern about pollution and protection at the same time exposing corruption.		
Best Feature Film in Malayalam	Akale	Producer: Tom George Kolath; Director: Shyamaprasad	₹ 20,000/- Each
Best Feature Film in Malayalam	Citation: For its sensitive handling of characters trapped in tragic situation, in an unconventional filmic way.		
Best Feature Film in Marathi	Uttarayan	Producer: Opticus Films; Director: Bipin Nadkarni	₹ 20,000/- Each
Best Feature Film in Marathi	Citation: For its portrayal of nostalgic love between two aged characters and their problems with the next generation.		
Best Feature Film in Punjabi	Des Hoyaa Pardes	Producer: Manjeet Maan; Director: Manoj Punj	₹ 20,000/- Each
Best Feature Film in Punjabi	Citation: For its sharp handling of terrorism in Punjab and portrayal of alienation, migration of Punjabi youth to the west of that time.		
Best Feature Film in Tamil	Navarasa	Producer: Sunil Doshi; Director: Santosh Sivan	₹ 20,000/- Each
Best Feature Film in Tamil	Citation: For its credible exploitation of the world of the third gender blended with director's own cinematic style.		
Best Feature Film in Telugu	Swarabhishekam	Producer: H. Gopalakrishna Murthy; Director: K. Viswanath	₹ 20,000/- Each
Best Feature Film in Telugu	Citation: For its excellent musical structure clubbed with great classical musical performance.		

Best Feature Film in Each of the Language Other Than Those Specified in the Schedule VIII of the Constitution

Name of Award	Name of Film	Awardee(s)	Cash prize
Best Feature Film in English	Amu	Producer: Shonali Bose; Director: Shonali Bose	₹ 20,000/- Each
Best Feature Film in English	Citation: For its innovative style of handling a girl’s search for her identity and her encounter with a scarred society.		

=== Non-Feature Films ===
Short Films made in any Indian language and certified by the Central Board of Film Certification as a documentary/newsreel/fiction are eligible for non-feature film section.

==== Juries ====
A committee headed by A. K. Bir was appointed to evaluate the non-feature films awards. Following were the jury members:

- Jury Members
  - A. K. Bir (Chairperson) • Kadambari Chintamani • Vasiraju Prakasam • Sudhish Gopalakrishnan • Supriyo Sen • Prasann Jain • Pushpesh Pant

==== Golden Lotus Award ====
Official Name: Swarna Kamal

All the awardees are awarded with 'Golden Lotus Award (Swarna Kamal)', a certificate and cash prize.

Name of Award	Name of Film	Language	Awardee(s)	Cash prize
Best Non-Feature Film	Girni	Marathi	Producer: Tripurari Sharan for Film and Television Institute of India; Director: Umesh Vinayak Kulkarni	₹ 20,000/- Each
Best Non-Feature Film	Citation: For projecting the impact of noise over a child's mind with excellent visualisation and fine cinematic dramatisation.			
Best Non-Feature Film Direction	Girni	Marathi	Umesh Vinayak Kulkarni	₹ 20,000/-
Best Non-Feature Film Direction	Citation: For portraying the impact of sound on a young and sensitive mind with excellent dramatic and cinematic style.			

==== Silver Lotus Award ====
Official Name: Rajat Kamal

All the awardees are awarded with 'Silver Lotus Award (Rajat Kamal)' and cash prize.

Name of Award	Name of Film	Language	Awardee(s)	Cash prize
Best First Non-Feature Film	Ek Sagar Kinaree... A Seaside Story	Marathi and English	Producer: Gomantar Marathi Academy; Director: Laxmikant Shetgaonkar	₹ 10,000/- Each
Best First Non-Feature Film	Citation: For handling the simple and delicate relationship between ordinary human beings in a very profound evocative and enterprising manner, within a commercialised compulsive atmosphere.			
Best Anthropological / Ethnographic Film	The Legend of Fat Mama	English	Producer: Rafeeq Ellias; Director: Rafeeq Ellias	₹ 10,000/- Each
Best Anthropological / Ethnographic Film	Citation: For presenting a nostalgic journey of the Chinese community in Kolkata in a very lively and engrossing, and yet thought provoking moment.			
Best Biographical Film	It's Prabhat	Marathi	Producer: A. V. Damle; Director: Madhavi Vaidya	₹ 10,000/- Each
Best Biographical Film	Citation: For presenting the glorious history of Prabhat Film Company in a very engaging and fascinating manner through excellent compilation of the excerpts of some of the renowned old films of the company.			
Best Scientific Film / Best Environment / Conservation / Preservation Film	Timeless Traveller-The Horseshoe Crab	English	Producer: Riverbank Studios; Director: Gautam Pandey	₹ 10,000/- Each
Best Scientific Film / Best Environment / Conservation / Preservation Film	Citation: For venturing to explore the most enigmatic creature, very scientific and analytic manner effectively urging mankind to conserve this unique species.			
Best Film on Social Issues	Dwijaa	Marathi	Producer: Tripurari Sharan for Film and Television Institute of India; Director: Pankaj Purandare	₹ 10,000/- Each
Best Film on Social Issues	Citation: For presenting the distress of a child widow and her graduation over reality with subtle and sensitive cinematic treatment.			
Best Exploration / Adventure Film	Shores of Silence – Whale Sharks in India	English	Producer: Gautam Pandey; Director: Ranjana Pandey	₹ 10,000/- Each
Best Exploration / Adventure Film	Citation: For capturing the cruelty of fisher-man over harmless sea-creature, the whale shark, along the Gujarat coast, with a fine insight and bravado, which could bring transformation to the ignorance of the fisherfock's mindless slaughter.			
Best Investigative Film	Harvest of Hunger	English and Oriya	Producer: Action Aid India, Bhubaneshwar; Director: Rupashree Nanda	₹ 10,000/- Each
Best Investigative Film	Citation: For portraying the apathy and the hardships of drought effected villagers from Bolangir District, and their struggle to survive under an atmosphere of compulsive exploitation in excellent investigative and poignant style.			
Best Animation Film	Raju and I	English and Hindi	Producer: Aseema Charitable Trust; Director: Gayatri Rao; Animator: Chetan Sharma	₹ 10,000/- Each
Best Animation Film	Citation: For depicting the emotional journey of a child and his experience and awareness of the social conditions through an excellent technique of animation.			
Best Short Fiction Film	Cradle Song	English and Hindi	Producer: Tripurari Sharan for Film and Television Institute of India; Director: Nimisha Pandey	₹ 10,000/- Each
Best Short Fiction Film	Citation: For exploring the mental agony of a couple, that has given birth to a crippled child in a very ethereal and stimulating cinematic style.			
Best Film on Family Welfare	Saanjh	Hindi	Producer: Tripurari Sharan for Film and Television Institute of India; Director: Jasmine Kaur	₹ 10,000/- Each
Best Film on Family Welfare	Citation: For a very sensitively structured short film which deals with the apathy of an old man and his encounter with reality.			
Best Cinematography	Girni	Marathi	Cameraman: Manoj Raymond Lobo; Laboratory Processing: Adlabs	₹ 10,000/- Each
Best Cinematography	Citation: For a short film which is highly enriched through excellent visual choreography.			
Best Audiography	Kshy Tra Ghya	Hindi	Vivek	₹ 10,000/-
Best Audiography	Citation: For evolving an experimental form of narration within a story form, with excellent sound design.			
Best Editing	Harvest of Hunger	English and Oriya	Prashant Naik	₹ 10,000/-
Best Editing	Citation: For documenting with apathy of the drought stricken villagers, by fluent and flowing editing style, keeping the interest on the subject, very engaging.			
Best Music Direction	Ek Sagar Kinaree... A Seaside Story	Marathi and English	Dhwani	₹ 10,000/-
Best Music Direction	Citation: For a short film which is extremely enhanced by the accompaniment of very throbbing and engaging music.			
Best Narration / Voice Over	The Legend of Fat Mama	English	Yang Yen Thaw	₹ 10,000/- Each
Best Narration / Voice Over	Citation: For communicates the nostalgic journey of the Chinese community in Calcutta through a moving narration, complying with the harmonious pace of the film.			
Special Jury Award	Kshy Tra Ghya	Hindi	Amit Dutta (Director)	₹ 10,000/-
Special Jury Award	Citation: For evolving an experimental form of narration within a story form, with excellent special visual effects in an innovative style.			

=== Best Writing on Cinema ===
The awards aim at encouraging study and appreciation of cinema as an art form and dissemination of information and critical appreciation of this art-form through publication of books, articles, reviews etc.

==== Juries ====
A committee headed by Rauf Ahmed was appointed to evaluate the writing on Indian cinema. Following were the jury members:

- Jury Members
  - Rauf Ahmed (Chairperson) • Utpal Borpujari • Shoma A. Chatterji

==== Golden Lotus Award ====
Official Name: Swarna Kamal

All the awardees are awarded with 'Golden Lotus Award (Swarna Kamal)' and cash prize.

Name of Award	Name of Book	Language	Awardee(s)	Cash prize
Best Book on Cinema	Stardust – Vignettes from the Fringes of Film Industry	English	Author: Roopa Swaminathan; Publisher: Penguin Books	₹ 15,000/- Each
Best Book on Cinema	Citation: For giving a rare, fascinating insight into the lives of people on the fringes of the film industry whose contribution to cinema is no less significant. The work is marked by painstaking research and incisive analysis that does not alienate the average cinema lover.			
Best Film Critic			Namrata Joshi	₹ 15,000/-
Best Film Critic	Citation: For consistently maintaining a high standard of film evaluation at a time when reviews are tending to become a public relations exercise. Her writings reveal a sound grasp of all aspects of film-making.			

=== Awards not given ===
Following were the awards not given as no film was found to be suitable for the award:

- Best Feature Film in Manipuri
- Best Feature Film in Oriya
- Best Historical Reconstruction / Compilation Film
- Best Arts / Cultural Film
- Best Educational / Motivational / Instructional Film
- Best Promotional Film
- Best Agricultural Film
