= Boota Singh =

Sikh soldier known for a tragic love story

- Born: Jalandhar district, Punjab, British India
- Died: 19 February 1957; Shahdara, Pakistan
- Other names: Shaheed-e-Mohabbat Boota Singh (lit. Martyr-in-Love Boota Singh)
- Known for: His tragic love story
- Spouse: Zainab
- Children: Tanveer Kaur (later Sultana)

Boota Singh sometimes spelled as Buta Singh, was a Sikh ex-soldier of the British Army who served at the Burma front under the command of Lord Mountbatten during World War II. He is popularly known in India and Pakistan for his love story with Zainab, a Muslim girl he rescued during the communal riots in the time of Partition of India in 1947. They both fell in love and got married. Later, Zainab was deported by Indian authorities and sent to the newly created Pakistan. Singh illegally entered Pakistan to reinstate contact with Zainab, but she ended the marriage under pressure from her family. In 1957, after the failure of the marriage, he took his own life by jumping before an upcoming train near Shahdara station in Pakistan along with his daughter, but his daughter survived.

The love story of Singh's life is widely adapted in films and books on both sides of the border. A Punjabi film Shaheed-e-Mohabbat Boota Singh (1999) is entirely based on the story. Ishrat Rahmani wrote a novel, Muhabbat, based on the story. The story also influenced many other films including a 2007 Canadian film Partition and the Bollywood films Gadar: Ek Prem Katha in 2001 and Veer-Zaara in 2004.

== Burial ==
In his suicide note, Singh expressed his last wish to be buried in Barki village where Zainab's parents resettled after partition. The autopsy of Singh's body was conducted in a hospital in Lahore and was taken to the village on 22 February 1957 for burial but the villagers did not allow that and Singh was buried at Miani Sahib, the largest graveyard of Lahore.

== In popular culture ==
- In 1999, Manoj Punj directed a Punjabi feature film, Shaheed-e-Mohabbat Boota Singh, entirely based on the life story of Boota Singh. The movie stars Gurdas Maan as Boota Singh and Divya Dutta as Zainab. The music was composed by Amar Haldipur. It was an international hit and won the National Film Award for Best Feature Film in Punjabi at the 46th National Film Awards and was also screened at many national and international film festivals including the 1999 Vancouver International Film Festival and International Film Festival of India.
- It also influenced a 2007 Canadian film, Partition, written by Patricia Finn and Vic Sarin, starring Jimi Mistry and Kristin Kreuk in lead roles.
- Ishrat Rahmani wrote a novel on the love story, titled Muhabbat.
- The story also has some details in an English book, Freedom at Midnight by Larry Collins and Dominique Lapierre.
- Jahangeer Badar also wrote a novel about it, titled Terey Ishaq Ki Intah Chahta Hoon.
