= List of Indian Punjabi films of the 1990s =

This is the list of Punjabi films released in the Indian Punjab during the 1990s.

== 1999 ==
- Shaheed-E-Mohabbat (Boota Singh) - Gurdas Maan, Divya Dutta, Raghuvir Yadav, Gurkirtan, Arun Bakshi, Gick Garewal & Amar Noori, Halley Brar (sp app) (Dir: Manoj Punj)
- Shaheed Udham Singh - Raj Babbar (guest app - Juhi Chawla, Shatrughan Sinha, Gurdas Maan, Amrish Puri, Kimi Verma, Ranjeet)
- Muqadder - Guggu Gill, Preeti Sapru, Pankaj Dhir, Manjeet Kular, Upasana Singh, Daman Maan, Surinder Sharma, Gurkirtan, Kiran Kumar
- Nadiyon Vichhrhe Neer - Kanwaljeet, Upasana Singh, Dharam Taneja, Neha Garewal
- Raajniti - Ranjeet, Priyanka, Tina Ghai, Iqbal, Surinder Sharma (Dir: Thakur Tapasvi)
- Ishq Nachave Gali Gali - Shivendra Mahal, Randeep Virender, Manjeet Kullar, Deepak Saraf, Neeru Singh (Director Balwant Dullat) (Release Date: 07/03/1999)
- Tera Mera Pyar - Dara Singh, Yograj Singh, Barkha Madan, Mehar Mittal (Director Pardeep Dhiman)
- Door Nahin Nankana - Dara Singh, Rama Vij, Shavinder Mahal, Neena Sandhu, Mehar Mittal
- Teriyan Mohabbatan - Avinash Wadhwan, Upasana Singh, Kulbir Bandesaron
- Mahaul Theek Hai (Release Date: 14/02/1999) - Raj Babbar, Daljeet Kaur, Samip Kang, Chandni Toor, Jaspal Bhatti, Savita Bhatti, Vivek Shauq, Asha Sharma, Kulbhushan Kharbanda, Aarti Puri, Jaswinder Bhalla, Bal Mukand Sharma, Gopi Bhalla, B. N. Sharma, Yograj, Sardool Sikander (Dir: Jaspal Bhatti)
- Dukh Samundron Paar De - Harbhajan Pawar, Chandan Gurang, Kalchu Dhir, Harbhajan Jabbal, Harjinder Grewal, Jatinder Kaur (Dir: Harbhajan Pawar)

== 1998 ==
- Main Maa Punjab Dee - Dara Singh, Shivendra Mahal, Manjit Kullar, Ravinder Mann, Bhagwant Mann, Neeru Singh and Deepak Saraf (Dir: Balwant Dullat)
- Purja Purja Katt Mare - Guggu Gill, Upasana Singh, Deep Dhillon, Harbhajan Jabbal, Jatinder Kaur
- Laali - Dara Singh, Vishal Singh, Ravinder Mann
- Sarbans Dani Guru Gobind Singh - Dara Singh, Pankaj Dheer, Sonu Walia, Kalbhooshan Kharbanda, Upasana Singh, Girija Shankar, Kiran Juneja, Ram Mohan, Tina Ghai, Harjeet Walia, Gufi Paintal, Roma Manik, Kulbir Bandesaro, Indirjeet, Deep Dhillon (Dir: Ram Maheshwari)
- Dildaara - Tanuja, Kalbhooshan Kharbanda, Paramveer, Dolly, Suraj Chadda, Avtar Gill, Sayeed Jaffrey, Gopi Bhalla, Rakesh Bedi, Guddi Maruti
- Suche Moti - Paramvir, Amita Nagia, Sangita Mehta
- Khoon Da Daaj - Kimi Verma, Doney Kapoor, Gick Garewal, B. N. Sharma
- Peenghan Pyar Diyan - Priya Nijhar, Chander Kamal
- Desh Drohi - Dalbir Singh, Nirmal Aulakh, Sonali Oberoi, Naina Singh, Bhupinder Bhindi, Madan Rahi, Gurkirtan & B. N. Sharma (Dir: Ranjeet R. Bhattacharaya)
- Dulla Bhatti - Randeep Varinder, Boskey Kapoor, Neeta Mahindra, Anil Sharma, Jassi Flora, Balmukund Sharma, Jaswinder Bhalla (Dir: Pammi Varinder)

== 1997 ==
- Mela - Amar Noori, Chandni Toor, Girija Shankar, Ajay Mankotia, Sardar Sohi, Nirmal Rishi, Satwinder Bitti
- Truck Driver - Preeti Sapru, Guggu Gill, Upasana Singh, Surinder Shinda, Gurkirtan (Dir: Ravinder Ravi)
- Sardari - Dara Singh, Guggu Gill, Pankaj Dheer, Priti Sapru, Upasna Singh, Gurkirtan (Dir: Priti Sapru)
- Preetan De Pehredaar
- Jaali Passport - Indirjeet, Aarti Gauri, Harry Sharan
- Train To Pakistan - Nirmal Pandey, Rajat Kapoor, Divya Dutta, Smriti Mishra
- Lambaddaar - Priya Nijhar
- Jung Da Maidan - Guggu Gill, Gurkirtan, Iqbal, Daljit Kaur, Kashmiri Laal, Ravinder Maan, Seema Sharma, Surinder Sharma, Yash Sharma, Simran Sukhi (Dir: Thakur Tapasvi)
- Zakhmi - Kumar Raj, Paramvir, Ravinder Mann, Yash Sharma, Mohd. sidik (Producer Director Pardeep Dhiman)
- Ishq Na Pooche Jaat - Sheetal Bedi, Gopi Bhalla, Gurkirtan, Seema Sharma, Vishal Singh, B. N. Sharma (Director: Rajesh Puri)

== 1996 ==
- Sukha - Vishal Singh, Reshamraj, Gurkirtan, B. N. Sharma, Lakhi Hundal & Bhagwant Mann (Dir: Iqbal Dhillon)
- Deson Pardeson - Shivendra Mahal, Manjeet Kullar, Ravinder Mann, Gulshan Grover
- Gawahi Jatt Di - Shivendra Mahal, Satnaam Kaur
- Jorawar - Sharandeep, Upasana Singh, Ravinder Mann, Jatinder Bhardawaj, Arjuna Bhalla
- Rab Dian Rakhan - Dara Singh, Vindu Singh, Farha, Gurkirtan, Surinder Sharma, Yash Sharma (Dir: Dara Singh)
- Pachtawa - Shivendra Mahal, Manjit Kullar, Ravinder Mann, Gurinder Mahal (Dir: Shivendra Mahal)
- Zakhmi Sher - Yograj, Arjun, Amar Noori, Aarti Gauri
- Vasiyat - Yograj, Arjun, Paramvir, Nina Sandhu, Surinder Walia (Dir: Surinder Walia, Mohan Singh Sandhu)
- Khel Taqdeeran De - Dara Singh, Yograj, Raiman Singh
- Rabb Kolo Darr Sajna - Sunil Puri, Suraj Chadda etc.
- Charda Suraj- Shawinder Mahal, Shivani, Surinder Shinda, Ajay Deolk, Suan Dutta, Kanwaljeet Dhillon, Shawinder Mahal, Shivani, Surinder Shinda, Ajay Deolk, Suan Dutta, Kanwaljeet Dhillon, Director: Sham Jaitly, Producer: Harkrishnan Kamboj

== 1995 ==
- Nain Preeto De - Yograj Singh, Pargat Bhagu, Ravinder Mann, Bhagwant Mann prem Deol
- Dhee Jatt Di - Upasana Singh, Shivendra Mahal, Gurkirtan (Dir: Krishan Sahani)
- Zaildaar/Jaildaar - Guggu Gill, Manjit Kullar, Surinder Sharma, Pargat Bhagoo, Seema Bhardwaj, Lakhi Hundal, Gurmeet Saajan, Gurkirtan (Dir: Shashi Raj) Produced by- Manjeet Lovely
- Pratigya - Dara Singh, Gurdas Mann, Preeti Sapru, Guggu Gill, Ravinder Mann, Gurkirtan, Parminder Sandhu, Damyinti Puri & Upasana Singh (sp app)
- Naseebo - Raj Babbar, Preeti Sapru, Kimi Verma, Mehar Mittal, Arun Bali, Girja Shankar & Gurdas Mann (Sp. Appearance)
- Qahar - Gurjeet Grewal, Kimi Verma, Pankaj Dheer, Sunita Dheer, Arun Bali
- Sir Dhad Di Baazi - Preeti Sapru, Sukhjinder Shera, Baby Anu, S. Das Moga, B. N. Sharma, Surinder Sharma (Dir: Sukhjinder Shera)
- Bagawat - Gurdas Mann, Surinder Shinda, Manjit Kullar, Kuldeep Manak, Gurkirtan, Surinder Sharma, Sarbjeet Mangat (Dir: Harinder Gill)
- Jakhmi Jagirdar - Yograj, Neena Sandhu, Sangita Mehta
- Kabzaa - Yograj, Rajinder Ruby
- Khel Taqdeeran De - Ved Goswami, Goga Kapoor Lally Sudesh Mahaan, Amrit Pal, Nirmal Rishi, Dara Singh, Sandeep Sohi, Sardar Sohi

== 1994 ==
- Mera Punjab - Shatrughan Sinha, Diljit Kaur, Guggu Gill, Upasana Singh
- Naseebo - Raj Babbar, Preeti Sapru, Amitoze Mann, Kimmi Verma, Surinder Rihal, Mehar Mittal, Girja Shankar, Prabhsharan Kaur, Arun Bali, Amrik Gill & Gurdas Maan (sp app) (Dir: Manmohan Singh)
- Tabaahi - Vishal Singh, Ravinder Maan, Surinder Shinda, Mohammad Sadiq, Bhagwant Mann, Surinder Sharma, Gurkirtan Written&Directed By:Harinder Gill
- Vairi - Guggu Gill, Yograj Singh, Manjit Kular, Ravinder Maan, Gurkirtan, Surinder Sharma, Gopi Bhalla (Dir: B. S. Shaad)
- Vichoda - Yograj Singh, Neena Sidhu
- Jigra Jatt Da - Preeti Sapru, Yograj Singh, Upasana Singh, Nina Sidhu, Nirmal Rishi
- Ucha Pind - Raj Babbar, Sukhjinder Shera, Ravinder Maan, Seema Kaushal, Gurkirtan, Jassi Flora.
- Jatt Punjab Da - Yograj Singh, Diljeet Kaur, Shavinder Mahal, Amar Noori, Neena Sandhu, Deep Dhillon (Dir: Yograj Singh)
- Kachehri - Gurdas Mann, Rama Vij, Yograj Singh, Shagufta Ali, Vijay Tandon, Mehar Mittal, Bhagwant Mann (Dir: Ravinder Peepat)
- Panchayat - Diljit Kaur, Yograj Singh, Arjun, Amar Noori, Sardool Sikander, Surinder Walia

== 1993 ==
- Mehndi Shagnan Di - Malkit Singh, Preeti Sapru, Hans Raj Hans, Yograj Singh, Shammi(sp app-Anita Raj) (Dir: Preeti Sapru)
- Jora Jatt - Daljeet Kaur, Yograj Singh, Nina Sidhu, Deep Dhillon
- Baaghi Soormey - Gugu Gill, Shavinder Mahal, Ravinder Mann, Shagufta Ali, Gurkirtan, (Dir: Krishan Sahani)
- Jatt Sucha Singh Surma - Yograj Singh, Neena Sidhu, Anil Sharma.
- Kudi Canada Di - Yograj Singh, Jatinder Jitu, Mehar Mittal
- Insaaf Punjab Da - Yograj Singh, Neena Sidhu
- Lalkare Sheran De - Satnam Singh Rai, Daljeet Kaur, Yograj Singh, Neena Sidhu
- Ankheela Soorma - Dara Singh, Manjit Kular, Daman Mann, Harbhajan Jabbal, Ramna Wadhwan
- Saali Adhi Gharwali - Diljit Kaur, Shashi Puri, Arjun, Upasana Singh, Ved Goswami, Amjad Khan, Ram Mohan,(sp app by Gurdas Maan, Raza Murad, Yograj Singh)
- Jid Jattan Di - Daljeet Kaur, Yograj Singh, Pankaj Dheer, Arjun, Goga Kapoor, Shivendra Mahal, Manjit Kular, Mohan Baggarh, Surinder Walia, Anil Pandit (Dir: Mohan Singh Sandhu)
- Putt Sardaran De - Gugu Gill, Yograj Singh, Nina Sidhu, Shalini Dhillon, Surinder Sharma & (guest app-Sardool Sikander & Amar Noorie) (Dir: Shashi Raj)

== 1992 ==
- Jatt Vilayati - Surinder Shinda, Mehar mital, B. K. Sood, Barkha Damini, Manju Maini, Anita Kanwal Music: Surinder Shinda Produced By: Sanjay Rawal
- Jatt Jeona Mour - Guggu Gill, Rupinder Gill, Gurkirtan, Manjeet Kular Mohammad Sadiq, Surinder Shinda Neena Bundhel, Parminder Sandhu, Harmel Sidhu Sangaria, Brownie Parasher, Harjeet Bhullar, Prabhsharan Kaur, Rajinder Puppy, Ganga, Surjit Bindrakhia, Diljit Kaur Rahi
- Mirza Jatt - Guggu Gill, Manjit Kular, Gurkirtan, Nirmal Nimmi, Prabhsharan Kaur, Darshan Aulakh, Harjeet Bhullar, Hemraj Sharma (Dir: Ravinder Ravi)

== 1991 ==
- Badla Jatti Da - Guggu Gill, Upasana Singh, Amar Noori, Sunita Dhir, Yograj Singh, Sharandeep (Dir: Ravinder Ravi) (producer: Sukhi Aklia)
- Udeekan Saun Diyan - Diljeet Kaur, Amar Noori, Shashi Puri, Sardar Sohi, Gurmeet Saajan
- Vaisakhi - Deep Dhillon & Sunita Dheer, Jatinder Bhardwaj, Amar Noorie, Harbhajan Jabbal, Arun Bali, Sukhbir Singh Batth
- Jorr Jatt Da - Gugu Gill, Sukhjinder Shera, Amar Noorie, Yograj Singh, Neena Sidhu, Satnam Kaur, Sangita Mehta, Mehar Mittal
- Jagga Daku - Yograj Singh, Daljit Kaur, Neena Sidhu, Surinder Walia, Anil Pandit (Dir: Surinder Walia)
- Taakre Jattan De - Daljit Kaur, Pankaj Dheer, Arjun, Deep Dhillon
- Yaaran Naal Baharan - Guggu Gill, Reema, Parminder Sandhu, Deep Dhillon (Dir: Ravi Bal)
- Jatt Da Gandasa - (Dir: Mohan Bhakri)
- Vyah Da Dhol - Shagufta Ali, Kunickaa Sadanand (Dir: Mohan Bhakri)

== 1990 ==
- Deeva Bale Sari Raat - Preeti Sapru, Girja Shankar, Nina Tiwana, Nirmal Rishi, Mehar Mittal and Harpal Tiwana (Dir: Harpal Tiwana)
- Bhabo - Preeti Sapru, B. L. Chopra, Shweta, Gursharan, Bharat Kapoor, Nina Tiwana (Dir: Sameer Chaudhry)
- Qurbani Jatt Di - Gurdas Maan, Dharmendra, Raj Babbar, Preeti Sapru, Yograj Singh, Guggu Gill, Mehar Mittal, Nirmal Rishi, Satish Kaul, Namrata Sahani (Dir: Preeti Sapru)
- Sheran De Putt Sher - Dara Singh, Dev Diwana, Daljit Kaur, Satish Kaul, Shobhni Singh, Shalni Dhillon, Nirmal Rishi, Ramna Wadhwan, Anil Pandit, Mehar Mittal (Dir: Anil Pandit)
- Hukumat Jatt Di - Daljit Kaur, Shashi Puri, Deep Dhillon (Dir: Chander H. Behl)
- Dushmani Di Agg - Veerendra, Gurdas Mann, Preeti Sapru, Manjeet Mann, Sharandeep, Yograj Singh, Deep Dhillon, Mehar Mittal, Jagmohan Kaur (Dir: Veerendra)
- Anakh Jattan Di - Daljeet Kaur, Guggu Gill, Mehar Mittal, Yograj Singh, Sangita Mehta, Yash Sharma, Surinder Shinda (Dir: Ravinder Ravi).
- Tera Mera Pyaar - Chico Sihra, Barkha, Satti Sihra, Dallia, Dara Singh, Yash Sharma, Nand Sihra, Mehar Mittal, Yograj, Perry Sihra, Kaja Khanna, J. K Batta, Asha Rani, Kuldeep, Munish, Directed by Perry, Produced by Charanjit Sihra, Lyrics by Dev Kohli, Vijay Dhami, Music by Kuljit

== See also ==
- List of Indian Punjabi films before 1970
- List of Indian Punjabi films between 1971 and 1980
- List of Indian Punjabi films between 1981 and 1990
- List of Indian Punjabi films of the 2000s
- List of Pakistani films
