= List of Indian Punjabi films of the 2000s =

This is the list of Punjabi films released in the Indian Punjab in the 2000s.

== 2009 ==
Sr. No.	Title	Director	Cast	Genre	Release date (Tentative)	Producer	Ref.
1	Jag Jeondeyan De Mele	Baljit Singh Deo	Harbhajan Mann, Tulip Joshi, Gurpreet Ghuggi, Puneet Issar, Gulzar Inder Singh Chahal	Romance	20 February 2009	Gulzar Inder Singh Chahal, Harbhajan Mann, Surinder Sanghera, Gurwinderpal Singh Sanghera	
2	Tera Mera Ki Rishta	Navnait Singh	Jimmy Shergill, Kulraj Randhawa, Anupam Kher, Archana Puran Singh, Raj Babbar, Gurpreet Ghuggi, Akshita Vasudeva, Dolly Mattoo, Rana Ranbir, Binnu Dhillon, Tee Jay Sidhu, Khushboo Grewal	Romance	10 April 2009	Mukesh Sharma, Spice Cine Vision	
3	Mini Punjab	Rimpy-Prince	Gurdas Maan, Manav Vij, Jividha Sharma, Ehsaan Khan, Vivek Shauq		17 April 2009	Kuljinder Singh Sidhu	
4	Munde U.K. De	Manmohan Singh	Jimmy Shergill, Amrinder Gill, Neeru Bajwa, Gurpreet Ghuggi, Akshita Vasudeva, Deep D22 Mhillon, Arun Bali		8 May 2009		
5	Lagda Ishq Hogaya	Sameep Kang	Roshan Prince, Rana Ranbir, Ghule Shah	Love	22 May 2009	Raj Kakra	
6	Luv U Bobby	Yograj Singh, Gurinder Dimpy	Gugu Gill, Yograj Singh, Poonam, Vikram Sidhu, Gurkirtan, Binnu Dhillon		12 June 2009	Gurbir Sandhu	
7	Punjab Gold	Raj Kumar	Sunny Deol, Preity Zinta				
8	Punnyan Di Raat	Santosh Dandekar	Vijay Khepad, J P Dutta, Jatinder Kaur, Harbhajan Jabbal	Horror	7 August 2009	Vijat Khepar	
9	Apni Boli Apna Des	Ravinder Peepat	Sarabjeet Cheema, Raj Babbar, Shweta Tiwari, Manav Vij, Simran Sachdev, Vivek Shauq, Upasna Singh, Sunita Dhir, Rana Jung Bahadur Gurpreet Ghuggi, Mona		28 August 2009	Sarabjeet Cheema, Amarjit Cheema, Bhupinder Singh Bhinda	
10	Akhiyaan Udeekdian	Mukesh Gautam	Lakhwinder Wadali, Harpreet Hanjrah, Gugu Gill, Nirmal Rishi, Gurkirtan, Neeta Mohindra, Sukhbir Razia, Satwant Kaur, Richi Bawa, Sudesh Lehri, Rana Ranbir, Sukhwinder Sukhi, Jagtar Jaggi, Sanjiv Atri, Gauri	Social Drama-Romance	2 October 2009	Davinder Kumar, Gaurav Bagai, Navtej Sandhu	
11	Siyasat	Sarabjit Beniwal		Action	30 October 2009	Sarabjit Beniwal	
12	Heer Ranjha	Harjeet Singh	Sarabjeet Singh, Neeru Bajwa, Sameep Kang, Guggu Gill, Jasbir Jassi, Harmeet Durra, Diljeet Kaur, Shawendar Maahal, Gursharan Mann	Romance	13 November 2009	Gulzar Inder Singh Chahal, Harbhajan Mann	
13	Channo	Sukhpal Sidhu	Jaskaran Bawa, J P Dutta, Gurkirtan, B N Sharma, Rana Jang Bahadur, Kamaljeet Kaur, Gurdev Dhillon, Baldev Deo, Nindi Dhillon, Prakash Gadhoo, Amrit Billa, Pali Mangat, Anita Mit, Ms Monu Singh, Gurwinder saran, Sukhpal Sidhu		27 November 2009	Sukhpal Sidhu	

== 2008 ==
	Title	Director	Cast	Genre	Release date (Tentative)	Producer
1	Punjab	Inderpal Singh	Bunty Singh, Gavie Chahal, Sukhi Pawar, Milind Gunaji, Raza Murad, Arun Bakshi		18 January 2008	Bunty Singh
2	Yaariyan	Deepak Grewal	Gurdas Mann, Gulshan Grover, Bhoomika Chawla, Om Puri, Okuku Wanyama, Raj Toora, Harjinder Singh Thind, Asrani, Farida Jalal	Romance Drama	25 January 2008	Pinky Basrao
3	Kaun Kise Da Beli	Jagtar Singh	Preet Brar, Preet Madhan, Kamal Brar, B. N. Sharma, Gurkirtan, Mohd. Sadiq, Jagtar Jaggi, Kartar Cheema, Sunny Sandhu, Dr. Surinder Sharma			Iqbal Singh Dhillon
4	Babal Da Vehra	Harbux Latta	Malkiat Singh, Yograj Singh, Avtar Gill, Sarabjit Mangat, Jaswant Daman, Jaswinder Bhalla, Dolly Malkiat, Arpita Sanghera, Sandeep Malhi, Giordan Rana	Drama	5 May 2008	Harbux Latta
5	Majaajan	Ravinder Ravi	Gavie Chahal, Sunny Cheema	Drama	6 June 2008	Sukhwinder Paul Singh
6	Vilaitiya		Balvir Boparai		18 July 2008	
7	Lakh Pardesi Hoiye		Julie Bir, Gracy Singh, Rajat Bedi, Kulbhushan Kharbanda, Aarti Puri	Drama	22 August 2008	Swaran Singh
8	Mera Pind	Manmohan Singh	Harbhajan Mann, Kimi Verma, Navjot Singh Sidhu, Guggu Gill, Gurpreet Ghuggi, Deep Dhillon, Navneet Nishan, Rana Ranbir, Sarabjit Mangat, Sheeba Bhakri, Darshan Aulakh	Drama Romance	5 September 2008	
9	Hashar	Gaurav Trehan	Babbu Mann, Gurleen Chopra, Mahima Mehta, Sudesh Lehri, Rana Ranbir, Gurkirtan	Romance	26 September 2008	Lucky Dhindsa
10	Heaven on Earth	Deepa Mehta	Preity Zinta, Vansh Bhardwaj, Baljinder Johal, Rajinder Singh Cheema, Ramanjit Kaur, Gourrav Sihan, Orville Maciel, Geetkia Sharma	Drama	24 October 2008	Deepa Mehta David Hamilton (Canada)
11	Sat Sri Akal	Kamal Sahni	Kimi Verma, Manpreet Singh, Arun Bali, Dolly Minhas, Avtar Singh Gill, Vivek Shauq, Nirmal Rishi, Manmeet Singh, Neelu Kohli, Sonpreet, Pooja Tandon		7 November 2008	K.S. Kohli
12	Wattanaan Ton Door	Rajan Layallppuri	Avinash Wadhawan, Gursewak Mann, Vivek Shauq, Upasana Singh, Deep Dhillon, Raza Murad, Sandeep Kaur, Ekta Trivedi, Sarhanjeet Singh, Shreya Soni, Arun Bakshi, Abbhay Bharghav, Kulbir Wadesron, Kiran Bharghav, Poonam Mishra, Raju Sherestha, Jaswinder, Chhaya, Sujit Rajput, Ashwini Bharadwaj, Special Appearance: Nirmal Pandey, Tinaa Ghaai	Drama	28 November 2008	Gaurav Sethi
13	Chak De Phatte	Smeep Kang	Smeep Kang, Mahie Gill, Jaspal Bhatti, Savita Bhatti, Vivek Shauq, Jaswinder Bhalla, Gurpreet Ghuggi, B. N. Sharma, Amit Dhawan, Gauri, Upasana Singh	Comedy	5 December 2008	Devinder Sandhu
14	Jameen Jatt Di Jaan	P.Pal Verma	Daljeet Kaur, Parminder, Upasana Singh, Gajendra Chauhan, Satyen Kappu, Yash Sharma, Priya Nijhar, Jatinder Jeetu, Gurkirtan	Action	1 December 2008	Sohan Lal Sohan

== 2007 ==
Sr. No.	Title	Director	Cast	Genre	Release date (Tentative)	Producer
1	Mitti Wajaan Maardi	Manmohan Singh	Harbhajan Mann, Japji Khera, Mahi Gill, Kanwaljit Singh, Deep Dhillon	Drama	14 September 2007	Manmohan Singh
2	Vidroh		Gugu Gill, Manjeet Kullar	Drama		
3	Wagah		Kashish Kaur, Ranjeet, Hans Raj Hans, Sudesh Lehri	Drama		
4	Sajna Ve Sajna		Bally Sagoo, Preeti Jhangiani, Daljeet Kaur, Dalip Tahil	Drama	19 October 2007	

== 2006 ==
- Main Tu Assi Tussi - Kulbhushan Kharbanda, Manmeet, Upasana Singh, Rakesh Bedi, Sunita Dhir, Rana Jung Bahadar
- Baghi (Release Date - 10/02/2006) - Om Puri, Girja Shankar, Parmveer Singh, Gurleen Chopra, Devinder Daman, Gaj Deol, Sardar Sohi, Jaswant Daman, Aneeta, Hardeep Doll (Dir: Sukhminder Dhanjal)
- Dil Apna Punjabi - Harbhajan Mann, Neeru Bajwa, Mahek Chahal, Deep Dhillon, Sunita Dhir, Gurpreet Ghuggi, Rana Rabir, Dara Singh, Kanwaljit Singh, Amar Noorie (Dir: Manmohan Singh)
- Ek Jind Ek Jaan (Release Date: 01/12/2006) - Raj Babber, Nagma, Aryan Vaid, Mighty Gill, Prabhleen Kaur, Arun Bakshi, Kulbir Bederson, Deep Dhillon, Gurpreet Ghuggi, Harbhajan Jabbal, Donny Kapoor, Jatinder Kaur, Rahul, Pammi Sandhu, Seetu, B. N. Sharma, Kuldip Sharma, Ritu Shivpuri, Prabheen Singh, Sameep Kang (Dir: Chitraarth)
- Mannat Release Date; 06/10/2006)- Jimmy Shergill, Kulraj Randhawa, Manav Vij, Surinder Bath, Deep Dhillon, Rupinder Kaur, Anita Shabdish, Tarsinder Singh, Ramit Walia, Kanwaljit Singh (Dir: Gurbir Singh Grewal)
- Rabb Ne Banaiyan Jodiean - Babbu Mann, Jajj Pandher, Doney Kapoor, Punit Issar, Gurpreet Ghuggi, Nilofar
- Rustam-e-Hind - Parminder Doomchheri, Shivender Mahal, Doney Kapoor, Guggu Gill, B. B. Verma (Dir: J. S. Cheema)
- Waaris Shah - Ishq Daa Warris - Gurdas Mann, Juhi Chawla, Divya Dutta, Sushant Singh, Gurkirtan
- Anokhe Amar Shaheed Baba Deep Singh Ji (Release Date: 28/07/2006) - Vindu Dara Singh, Deep Dhillon, Kashish, Afzal Khan, Gurpreet Singh, Murali A. Lalwani, Gurinder Makna, Sandip Singh, Jaswant Saggo (Jas), Rajwinder Singh Hundel (Dir: Jaswinder Chahal)
- Mehndi Wale Hath — Gugu Gill, Manjeet Kullar, Gavie Chahal, Goldie, Sukhi Pawar, Prabhleen Kaur, Sania, Rana Ranbir, Gurkirtan (Written & Directed By Harinder Gill)

== 2005 ==
- Des Hoyaa Pardes (Release Date: 14/01/2005) - Gurdas Maan, Juhi Chawla, Divya Dutta, Parmeet Sethi, Sudhir Pandey, Anup Soni, Madhumati, Gurkirtan, Deborah Delarado, Gogi Kohli, Maureen McDonough, Bidya Rao, Gurmeet Sajja (Dir: Manoj Punj)
- Nalaik - Bobby Deol (sp app), Guggu Gill, Vivek Shauq, Aarti Puri, Jaspal Bhatti, Vijay Tandon, Kulbir Bandesaro, Jagtar Jaggi, Gurpreet Ghuggi, Harbhajan Jabbal, Jatinder Kaur, (Dir: Ravi Nishad)
- Yaraan Naal Baharaan - Raj Babbar, Jimmy Shergill, Juhi Babbar, Anupam Kher, Sunita Dhir, Ketki Dave, Gurpreet Ghuggi, Sonika Gill, Gavie Chahal, Sudeepa Singh (Dir- Manmohan Singh)
- Na Kar Badnam Canada Nu - Komal Dhillon, Parminder Gill, Jatinder Sahota, Seema Sidhu, (Dir: Sukhjinder Shera)

== 2004 ==
- Pind Di Kudi - Sarbjeet Cheema, Rima, Sheeba Bhakri, Gurpreet Ghuggi, Veena Malik
- Addi Tappa - Dir: Jeet Matharu Producer: Bimal Parmar & Jeet Matharu, Suresh Varsani Writer: Jeet Matharu
- Asa Nu Maan Watna Da (Release Date: 07/05/2004) Harbhajan Mann, Kimi Verma, Neeru Bajwa, Kanwaljeet Singh, Deep Dhillon, Navneet Nishan, Gurpreet Ghuggi, Preet Cheema, Vivek Shauq, Sukhwinder Sukhi, Gurdeep Kaur Brar, Nirmaljeet Nijjer, Jagroop Shergill, Dara Nagra, Amritpal, Manav Vij, Dir: Manmohan Singh
- Mitter Pyara Nu Haal Mureedan Da Kehna - Dara Singh, Rama Vij, Vindu Singh, Sheeba, Rajeshwari Sachdev, Mukesh Rishi, Deep Dhillon, Navin Nischol, Akshay Kumar (Dir: Ratan Aulakh)

== 2003 ==
- Badla: the revenge (Release Date: 12/08/2003) - Jaswinder Bhalla, Manjit Saini, Pritpal Kang, Pratap Rana, Gugni Gill, Resham Bhappa, Biloo Badshah, Lali Ghuman (Dir: Mukhtar Singh Mukha)(Bapp Sirsa)

== 2002 ==
- Jee Aayan Nu

== 2001 ==
- Sikandera - Guggu Gill, Preeti Sapru, Yograj Singh, Bhagwant Mann, Deepika Singh, Malkit Singh Nahal
- Jagira - Sukhjinder Shera, Gugni Gill, B. N. Sharma (Dir: Sukhjinder Shera
- Khalsa Mero Roop Hai Khaas - Ayesha Jhulka, Avinash Wadhwan, Paramvir, Raymon Singh, Pramod Moutho (Dir: Shyam Ralhan)

== 2000 ==
- Dard Pardesaan Dey - Avinash Wadhawan, Upasna Singh, Paramvir, Deepshikha (Dir: Chander Mohan Nillay)
- Charda Suraj - Shavinder Mahal, Suman Dutta, Shivani
- Yaar Maar - Yograj Singh, Neena Sidhu, Simran (Dir: Yograj Singh)
- Ishq Na Puche Jaat - Vishal Singh, Sheetal Bedi, Gurkirtan, B. N. Sharma (Dir: Rajesh Puri)

== See also ==
- List of Indian Punjabi films before 1970
- List of Indian Punjabi films between 1971 and 1980
- List of Indian Punjabi films between 1981 and 1990
- List of Indian Punjabi films between 1991 and 2000
- List of Pakistani films
