= List of Punjabi songs recorded by Shreya Ghoshal =

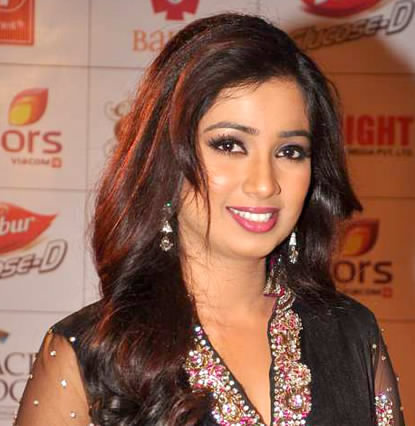
Shreya Ghoshal at The Global Indian Film & Television Honors 2012

Shreya Ghoshal (born 12 March 1984) is an Indian playback singer. She sings in Hindi, Tamil Telugu as well as in Kannada, Malayalam, Marathi, Gujarati, Bengali, Assamese, Nepali, Oriya, Bhojpuri, Punjabi and Tulu. Ghoshal's career began when she won the Sa Re Ga Ma Pa contest as an adult. Her Bollywood playback singing career began with Devdas, for which she received National Film Award for Best Female Playback Singer along with Filmfare Award for Best Female Playback Singer and Filmfare RD Burman Award for New Music Talent. Since then, she has received many other awards. Ghoshal was also honored from the U.S. state of Ohio, where the governor Ted Strickland declared 26 June as "Shreya Ghoshal Day". In April 2013, she was awarded with the highest honour in London by the selected members of House of Commons of the United Kingdom. In July 2015, John Cranley, the Mayor of the City of Cincinnati also honoured her by proclaiming 24 July 2015 as "Shreya Ghoshal Day of Entertainment and Inspiration" in Cincinnati. She was also featured five times in Forbes list of the top 100 celebrities of India. In 2017, Ghoshal became the first Indian singer to have a wax statute of her in Madame Tussauds Museum.

After a huge success of Devdas album Shreya Ghoshal was immediately called by various regional film industries for recording songs in her voice. In 2015, Ghoshal received a nomination in the category of Female Vocalist of the Year for the song "Tere Ishq Ne" from the movie Dil Vil Pyaar Vyaar in Mirchi Music Awards Punjabi 2014. She sang more than 25 songs in Punjabi.

This is a list of songs recorded by her in the Punjabi language.

== Film Songs ==
She sang more than 23 Film songs in Punjabi.

=== 2006 ===
Film	Song	Composer(s)	Lyricist(s)	Co-artist(s)
Wagah	"Oye Mundeyo - Oye Mundeyo"	Kittu - Kuljit, Dharam - Satyam	Ashok Gupta	Babbu Maan, Satyam, Mamta, Dimple
Wagah	"Shava Shava"	Kittu - Kuljit, Dharam - Satyam	Ashok Gupta	
Wagah	"Sun Kudiye Ni Gal Sun Kudiye"	Kittu - Kuljit, Dharam - Satyam	Ashok Gupta	Babbu Maan
Wagah	"Menhdi Lathi Bhi Nahi"	Kittu - Kuljit, Dharam - Satyam	Ashok Gupta	
Wagah	"Shava Shava" (Remix)	Kittu - Kuljit, Dharam - Satyam	Ashok Gupta	

=== 2007 ===
Film	Song	Composer(s)	Lyricist(s)	Co-artist(s)
Mohabbataan Sachiyaan	"Ud Gaiyan Neendran"	Wajahat Atre	Riaz ur Rehman Saghar	Sonu Nigam
Mohabbataan Sachiyaan	"Tery Bin Chain Nae Aonda"	Wajahat Atre	Riaz ur Rehman Saghar	Sonu Nigam
Mohabbataan Sachiyaan	"Main Jeena Tery Naal"	Wajahat Atre	Riaz ur Rehman Saghar	
Mohabbataan Sachiyaan	"Sajna We Piji Rut"	Wajahat Atre	Riaz ur Rehman Saghar	
Mohabbataan Sachiyaan	"Teriyan Yaadaan"	Wajahat Atre	Riaz ur Rehman Saghar	Sonu Nigam
Sajna Ve Sajna	"Gori Gori Kudi"	Bally Sagoo	Dev Kohli, Jelly Manjitpuri	
Sajna Ve Sajna	"Gori Gori Kudi" (Remix Version)	Bally Sagoo	Dev Kohli, Jelly Manjitpuri	
Sajna Ve Sajna	"Yaar Di Zulf Udoundi"	Bally Sagoo	Dev Kohli, Jelly Manjitpuri	Udit Narayan
Chooriyan	"Kala Doriya"	Sardool Sikander	Debi Makhsoospuri, Khawaja Pervez	Rajesh Krishnan, Sardool Sikander

=== 2009 ===
Film	Song	Composer(s)	Lyricist(s)	Co-artist(s)
Jag Jeondeyan De Mele	"Payar"	Sandesh Shandilya	Babu Singh Maan	Harbhajan Mann
Akhiyaan Udeekdian	"Mohabbatan"	Gurmeet	Gurminder Kaindowal	Lakhwinder Wadali

=== 2010 ===
Film	Song	Composer(s)	Lyricist(s)	Co-artist(s)
Sukhmani: Hope for Life	"Rabba"	Jaidev Kumar	Gurdas Maan	

=== 2014 ===
Film	Song	Composer(s)	Lyricist(s)	Co-artist(s)
Dil Vil Pyaar Vyaar	"Tere Ishq Ne"	Jatinder Shah	Kumaar	Gurdas Maan
Dil Vil Pyaar Vyaar	"Tere Ishq Ne" (Sad Version)	Jatinder Shah	Kumaar	Gurdas Maan, Juhi Chawala

=== 2015 ===
Film	Song	Composer(s)	Lyricist(s)	Co-artist(s)
Honour Killing	"Dilan Te Hukumtaan" (Female Version)	Uttam Singh	Dev Kohli	
Honour Killing	"Dholna"	Uttam Singh	Dev Kohli	Kunal Ganjawala

=== 2018 ===
Film	Song	Composer(s)	Lyricist(s)	Co-artist(s)
Banjara	"Safar"	Babbu Maan	Babbu Maan	Babbu Maan

=== 2025 ===
Film	Song	Composer(s)	Lyricist(s)	Co-artist(s)
Akaal: The Unconquered	"Kan Kan"	Shankar-Ehsaan-Loy	Happy Raikoti	Shankar Mahadevan

=== Unreleased Punjabi film songs ===
† : denotes officially unreleased songs
TBA : to be announced

Film	Song	Composer(s)	Lyricist(s)	Co-artist(s)
Hikk Naal	"Tikana Sohniya"	Tru-Skool	Jaggi Singh	
Hikk Naal	"Tikana Sohniya" (Re-Fix)	Tru-Skool	Jaggi Singh	

== Non-Film Songs ==
=== 2012 ===
Album	Song	Composer(s)	Lyricist(s)	Co-artist(s)
Simar Mana	"Charan Chalo"	Gurmeet Singh	Gurbani	Bhai Baljeet Singh

=== 2014 ===
Album	Song	Composer(s)	Lyricist(s)	Co-artist(s)
Guru Manyo Granth:Aarti Kirtan Shabad Gurbani	"Dithe Sabhe Thav Nahin Tudh Jeha"	Uttam Singh	Gurbani	Shaan
Guru Manyo Granth:Aarti Kirtan Shabad Gurbani	"Nanak Bijilian Chamkan"	Uttam Singh	Gurbani	

=== 2022 ===
Album	Song	Composer(s)	Lyricist(s)	Co-artist(s)
Tere Bajjon	"Tere Bajjon"	Jatinder Shah	Kumaar	

=== 2025 ===
Album	Song	Composer(s)	Lyricist(s)	Co-artist(s)
Lelo	"Lelo"	Keshav Tyohar, Harjot Kaur, Shrey Gupta	Youngveer	

== See also ==
List of songs recorded by Shreya Ghoshal
