= 46th National Film Awards =

2000 Indian film award

- Awarded for: Best of Indian cinema in 1998
- Awarded by: Directorate of Film Festivals
- Presented by: K. R. Narayanan (President of India)
- Presented on: 15 February 2000
- Official website: dff.nic.in

Highlights
- Best Feature Film: Samar
- Best Non-Feature Film: In The Forest Hangs a Bridge
- Best Book: Cinemaee Bhasha Aur Hindi Samvadon Ka Vishleshan
- Best Film Critic: Meenakshi Shedde
- Dadasaheb Phalke Award: B. R. Chopra
- Most awards: Godmother (6)

The 46th National Film Awards, presented by Directorate of Film Festivals, the organisation set up by Ministry of Information and Broadcasting, India to felicitate the best of Indian Cinema released in the year 1998. Ceremony took place on 15 February 2000 and awards were given by then President of India, K. R. Narayanan.

== Awards ==
Awards were divided into feature films, non-feature films and books written on Indian cinema.

=== Lifetime Achievement Award ===
Name of Award	Image	Awardee(s)	Awarded As	Awards
Dadasaheb Phalke Award		B. R. Chopra	director and producer	Swarna Kamal, ₹ 100,000 and a Shawl

=== Feature films ===
Feature films were awarded at All India as well as regional level. For 46th National Film Awards, a Hindi film, Samar won the National Film Award for Best Feature Film, whereas another Hindi film, Godmother won the maximum number of awards (6). Following were the awards given in each category:

==== Juries ====
A committee headed by D. V. S. Raju was appointed to evaluate the feature films awards. Following were the jury members:

- Jury Members
  - D. V. S. Raju (Chairperson) • Mirnmoy Chakraborty • Nachiket Patwardhan • Aruna Vasudev • Ramesh Sippy • B. Narsing Rao • Suresh Heblikar • Ranjan Bose • Bhawana Somaaya • Chitraarth • Gautam Bora • Sumitra Bhave • Bhaskar Chandavarkar • Vennira Aadai Nirmala • Balachandra Menon • J. L. Ralhan • Ali Peter John

==== All India Award ====
Following were the awards given:

===== Golden Lotus Award =====
Official Name: Swarna Kamal

All the awardees are awarded with 'Golden Lotus Award (Swarna Kamal)', a certificate and cash prize.

Name of Award	Name of Film	Language	Awardee(s)	Cash prize
Best Feature Film	Samar	Hindi	Producer: Shyam Benegal, Sahyadri Films and NFDC director: Shyam Benegal	₹ 50,000/- Each
Best Feature Film	Citation: For the innovative and human manner in which the director structures and presents a continuing social evil.			
Best Debut Film of a Director	Daya	Malayalam	Producer: C. K. Gopinath; Director: Venu	₹ 25,000/- Each
Best Debut Film of a Director	Citation: For its depiction of a delightful fairy-tale-like theme lending exotic sophistication and colour to the unique mosaic of creativity, imagination and style.			
Best Popular Film Providing Wholesome Entertainment	Kuch Kuch Hota Hai	Hindi	Producer: Yash Johar; Director: Karan Johar	₹ 40,000/- Each
Best Popular Film Providing Wholesome Entertainment	Citation: For the irresistible charm and universal appeal of its story, music, dance and performances.			
Best Children's Film	Kabhi Pass Kabhi Fail	Hindi	Producer: N'CYP; Director: Virendra Saini	₹ 30,000/- Each
Best Children's Film	Citation: For weaving an enchanting tale that can be enjoyed by children of all ages and drawing memorable performances from its large cast of characters.			
Best Direction	Janani	Malayalam	Rajeevnath	₹ 50,000/-
Best Direction	Citation: For a warmly compassionate film where subject and treatment are in perfect harmony.			

===== Silver Lotus Award =====
Official Name: Rajat Kamal

All the awardees are awarded with 'Silver Lotus Award (Rajat Kamal)', a certificate and cash prize.

Name of Award	Name of Film	Language	Awardee(s)	Cash prize
Best Feature Film on National Integration	Zakhm	Hindi	Producer: Pooja Bhatt; Director: Mahesh Bhatt	₹ 30,000/- Each
Best Feature Film on National Integration	Citation: For boldly dealing with social and religious strife, communal tensions, violence and disharmony in contemporary times. The film has a message of love and peace that is conveyed in a sensitive way.			
Best Film on Family Welfare	Atmiyo Swajan	Bengali	Producer: Dhatri Films; Director: Raja Sen	₹ 30,000/- Each
Best Film on Family Welfare	Citation: For vividly portraying emotional and moral problems faced by an extended family wearing a rich tapestry of relationships, the film brings forth hope for the aged and celebrates life for the young.			
Best Film on Other Social Issues	Chinthavishtayaya Shyamala	Malayalam	Producer: C. Karunakaran; Director: Sreenivasan	₹ 30,000/- Each
Best Film on Other Social Issues	Citation: For its strong theme of a woman's struggle against relentless difficulties heaped upon her by her worthless husband. Her ultimate success and emancipation prove to be socially inspiring.			
Best Film on Environment / Conservation / Preservation	Malli	Tamil	Producer: N'CYP; Director: Santosh Sivan	₹ 30,000/- Each
Best Film on Environment / Conservation / Preservation	Citation: For its lucid and lyrical depiction of nature and the need to save the environmental assets which have made life on tris earth possible and beautiful.			
Best Actor	Zakhm	Hindi	Ajay Devgn	₹ 10,000/- Each
Best Actor	Citation: For his restrained and moving performance of an angry man exasperated with the failing system.			₹ 10,000/- Each
Best Actor	Dr. Babasaheb Ambedkar	English	Mammootty	₹ 10,000/- Each
Best Actor	Citation: For bringing to life a great national figure in a strong and memorable performance spanning several decades across three continents.			₹ 10,000/- Each
Best Actress	Godmother	Hindi	Shabana Azmi	₹ 10,000/-
Best Actress	Citation: For her dramatic and passionate portrayal of a woman forced to fight in a man's world. The actress lends a rare intensity and dignity to her portrayal as the victim forced to take the law into her hands she projects a wide range of intricate and complek emotions with ease and sincerity. Shabana Azmi flawlessly weaves expression, voice and body language and comes up with one of her most memorable performances to date.			
Best Supporting Actor	Satya	Hindi	Manoj Bajpai	₹ 10,000/-
Best Supporting Actor	Citation: For his flawless performance of the eccentric underworld figure trapped in a system, cold blooded yet vulnerable at the same time.			
Best Supporting Actress	Hu Tu Tu	Hindi	Suhasini Mulay	₹ 10,000/-
Best Supporting Actress	Citation: For bringing alive negative personality without losing her human face. She acts with conviction and comes up with a powerful performance.			
Best Child Artist	Malli	Tamil	P. Shwetha	₹ 10,000/-
Best Child Artist	Citation: For her infectious and vibrant performance of a young child's pure bonding with nature and her trauma at the decadence in environment.			
Best Male Playback Singer	Godmother ("Suno Re Bhaila")	Hindi	Sanjeev Abhyankar	₹ 10,000/-
Best Male Playback Singer	Citation: For the song in which he successfully blends folk, bhajan and popular music to communicate the lyrics effectively.			
Best Female Playback Singer	Kuch Kuch Hota Hai ("Kuch Kuch Hota Hai")	Hindi	Alka Yagnik	₹ 10,000/-
Best Female Playback Singer	Citation: Her rendering of this theme song brings out the different moods and emotion and adds greatly to the impact of the film.			
Best Cinematography	Dil Se..	Hindi	Cameraman: Santosh Sivan; Laboratory Processing: Gemini Color Lab, Madras	₹ 10,000/- Each
Best Cinematography	Citation: His camera travels across spectacular landscapes and architecture and through bustling humanity with great seductive charm, colours and moods are created with equal ease in a film which sets a high standard of cinematic perfection.			
Best Screenplay	Samar	Hindi	Ashok Mishra	₹ 10,000/-
Best Screenplay	Citation: For Hindi film Samar where he has used a unique structure to ekplore the complek contradictions of urban/rural, rich/poor, pcwerful/dcwntrodden in a simple story line laced with poignant Moments of humour and irony for a perceptive insight into contemporary indian life.			
Best Audiography	Dil Se..	Hindi	H. Sridhar	₹ 10,000/-
Best Audiography	Citation: For capturing sounds as varied as the visuals and creating an unusual rhytham on the sound track.			
Best Editing	Godmother	Hindi	Renu Saluja	₹ 10,000/-
Best Editing	Citation: For her smart slick and innovative editing adds an artistic touch to the film. her pacing of the cuts enhance the emotions and sound overlaps lend a remarkable lucidity to the narration.			
Best Art Direction	Dr. Babasaheb Ambedkar	English	Nitin Chandrakant Desai	₹ 10,000/-
Best Art Direction	Citation: The film covers a large time span from the pre-electricity age to post independence India. The scene, both indoor and outdoor move effortlessly around rural, urban, Indian and foreign locales and blur the distinction between sets and locations – with the aid of faultless camerawork, the art direction almost single handedly creates the entire period mood and feel of the film.			
Best Costume Design	Daya	Malayalam	S. B. Satheesan	₹ 10,000/-
Best Costume Design	Citation: For a fantasy without any concrete reference to known periods, locales or styles – the film achieves a high quality design integrity. The use of fabrics, weaves and prints are superbly executed and leave a lasting impression.			
Best Music Direction	Godmother	Hindi	Vishal Bhardwaj	₹ 10,000/-
Best Music Direction	Citation: For the Hindi film Godmother where the narrative of the film and the music bring about an excellent blend of folk and modern music. It retains the fragrance of the soil of Gujarat.			
Best Lyrics	Godmother ("Maati Re Maati Re")	Hindi	Javed Akhtar	₹ 10,000/-
Best Lyrics	Citation: For the authentic blend of dialect and emotion. a song of patriotism and passion, the lyrics are lucid and thought provoking.			
Best Special Effects	Jeans	Tamil	S. T. Venki	₹ 10,000/-
Best Special Effects	Citation: For his extremely innovative and spectacular special effects created on computor. The animation of the twin characters is fascinating and intriguing.			
Best Choreography	Daya ("Swargam Thedi Vannore")	Malayalam	Brinda	₹ 10,000/-
Best Choreography	Citation: For the spirited and novel adaptation of an Arabic dance.			
Special Jury Award	Kichhhu Sanlap Kichhu Pralap	Bengali	• Drishyakavya (Producer) • Ashoke Viswanathan (Director)	₹ 12,500/- Each
Special Jury Award	Citation: The film is extra-ordinary in its experimental effort and works as a satire on our value system dominated by the pseudo intellectuals.			
Special Mention	Kante Koothurne Kanu	Telugu	Dasari Narayana Rao (Producer and Director)	Certificate Only
Special Mention	Citation: For taking a stand on gender discrimination.			Certificate Only
Special Mention	Anthapuram	Telugu	Prakash Raj (Actor)	Certificate Only
Special Mention	Citation: For his wholesome performance of the obsessive feudal lord still, living in medieval times.			Certificate Only
Special Mention	Kannezhuthi Pottum Thottu	Malayalam	Manju Warrier (Actress)	Certificate Only
Special Mention	Citation: For her subdued and consistence performance in several films entered for the awards.			Certificate Only

==== Regional Awards ====
The award is given to best film in the regional languages in India.

Name of Award	Name of Film	Awardee(s)	Cash prize
Best Feature Film in Assamese	Kuhkal	Producer: Dolphin Communications; Director: Jahnu Barua	₹ 20,000/- Each
Best Feature Film in Assamese	Citation: For its authentic portrayal of a historical event of british india.		
Best Feature Film in Bengali	Asukh	Producer: D. Ramanaidu; Director: Rituparno Ghosh	₹ 20,000/- Each
Best Feature Film in Bengali	Citation: For profiling the dilemma of a film actress, at a delicate point in her life. Rejected by her lover in love with another woman, asukh is an internalised study of an actress coming to terms with multiple pressures in her life.		
Best Feature Film in Hindi	Godmother	Producer: Gramco Films; Director: Vinay Shukla	₹ 20,000/- Each
Best Feature Film in Hindi	Citation: The films deals with contemporary power structure and confronts violence, corruption and passions with ease. The music, art direction and the dialogues combine to create a strong ethnic character setting a new trend in popular Indian cinema.		
Best Feature Film in Kannada	Hoomale	Producer: K. S. Usha Rao; Director: Nagathihalli Chandrashekar	₹ 20,000/- Each
Best Feature Film in Kannada	Citation: For its strong statement about a widow surmounting severe trials in an unfamiliar land and circumstances and finding love against a background of terrorism.		
Best Feature Film in Malayalam	Agnisakshi	Producer: Srishti Films; Director: Shyamaprasad	₹ 20,000/- Each
Best Feature Film in Malayalam	Citation: It authentically deals with the social ambience prevailing among the brahmin community ages ago. The story unfolded through the bold adventures of one brahmin woman – Thethi – who finally takes to Sanyas.		
Best Feature Film in Marathi	Tu Tithe Mee	Producer: Smita Talwalkar; Director: Sanjay Surkar	₹ 20,000/- Each
Best Feature Film in Marathi	Citation: For shedding light on the plight of the old and the ageing and the crumbling of the joint family system in a novel and entertaining format of a love story. Beautiful performance by Mohan Joshi and Suhas Joshi are the highlights of the film.		
Best Feature Film in Oriya	Nandan	Producer: N'CYP; Director: Apurba Kishore Bir	₹ 20,000/- Each
Best Feature Film in Oriya	Citation: For its simple story and realistic milieu. Nandan portrays the aspiration of a poor child and the constraints of his parents in fulfilling them. The triumph of family values and love over material gloss has universal appeal.		
Best Feature Film in Punjabi	Shaheed-E-Mohabbat	Producer: Manjeet Maan; Director: Manoj Punj	₹ 20,000/- Each
Best Feature Film in Punjabi	Citation: For its sensitive depiction of pain and sorrow perpetrated by the partition of India on Boota Singh, excellently portrayed by Gurdas Maan, the films reflects the aftermath of a tragedy delivers a message of love and humanity reaching far beyond the man made borders.		
Best Feature Film in Tamil	House Full	Producer: Bioscope Film Framers; Director: R. Parthiepan	₹ 20,000/- Each
Best Feature Film in Tamil	Citation: For telling the story of a theatre manager and his passionate bonding with his audience. A bomb is discovered in the theatre bharat talkies during show time but removed in the nick of time saving the lives of those in the audience. In denouncing violence, the film makes a strong statement against terrorism.		
Best Feature Film in Telugu	Tholi Prema	Producer: G. V. G. Raju; Director: A. Karunakaran	₹ 20,000/- Each
Best Feature Film in Telugu	Citation: For an unusual love story about two friends who confess their feelings for each other at the end of the film, which is a break from the run-of-the-mill film.		

Best Feature Film in Each of the Language Other Than Those Specified in the Schedule VIII of the Constitution

Name of Award	Name of Film	Awardee(s)	Cash prize
Best Feature Film in English	Dr. Babasaheb Ambedkar	Producer: Government of India and Government of Maharashtra; Director: Jabbar Patel	₹ 20,000/- Each
Best Feature Film in English	Citation: For an authentic and well researched biographical film which probes the political and social aspects of the life of one of the greatest leaders of India.		

=== Non-Feature Films ===
Short Films made in any Indian language and certified by the Central Board of Film Certification as a documentary/newsreel/fiction are eligible for non-feature film section.

==== Juries ====
A committee headed by Shaji N. Karun was appointed to evaluate the non-feature films awards. Following were the jury members:

- Jury Members
  - Shaji N. Karun (Chairperson) • Rajesh Parmar • Nandan Kudhyadi • Sehjo Singh • Shoma A. Chatterjee

==== Golden Lotus Award ====
Official Name: Swarna Kamal

All the awardees are awarded with 'Golden Lotus Award (Swarna Kamal)', a certificate and cash prize.

Name of Award	Name of Film	Language	Awardee(s)	Cash prize
Best Non-Feature Film	In The Forest Hangs a Bridge	English	Producer: Sanjay Kak; Director: Sanjay Kak	₹ 20,000/- Each
Best Non-Feature Film	Citation: For the excellent cinematic documentation of the triumph of the collective spirit of human endeavour.			

==== Silver Lotus Award ====
Official Name: Rajat Kamal

All the awardees are awarded with 'Silver Lotus Award (Rajat Kamal)' and cash prize.

Name of Award	Name of Film	Language	Awardee(s)	Cash prize
Best First Non-Feature Film	Repentance	Malayalam	Producer: Mohan Agashe for Films Division; Director: Rajeev Raj	₹ 10,000/- Each
Best First Non-Feature Film	Citation: For exploring new forms of cinematic expression and images.			
Best Anthropological / Ethnographic Film	Kherwal Parab	Santali	Producer: Sankar Rakshit; Director: Sankar Rakshit	₹ 10,000/- Each
Best Anthropological / Ethnographic Film	Citation: For offering an insider's view into Santhal rites and rituals with authenticity and honesty.			
Best Biographical Film	• 'Premji' – Ithihasathinte Sparsam • Unarvinte Kalam – M.R.B.	Malayalam	Producer: Kerala Sangeetha Nataka Akademi; Director: M. R. Rajan	₹ 10,000/- Each
Best Biographical Film	Citation: For an insightful voyage into the meaningful and exemplary lives of Premji and M.R.B., two legendary social reformers.			
Best Arts / Cultural Film	A Painter of Eloquent Silence: Ganesh Pyne	English	Producer: Buddhadeb Dasgupta; Director: Buddhadeb Dasgupta	₹ 10,000/- Each
Best Arts / Cultural Film	Citation: For a moving tribute from one artist to another and an appreciation of a painter's hidden expression.			
Best Environment / Conservation / Preservation Film	Willing To Sacrifice	English	Producer: Dayakar Rao; Director: B. V. Rao	₹ 10,000/- Each
Best Environment / Conservation / Preservation Film	Citation: For an honest portrayal of the sacred convictions of a people for whom conservation is a way of life.			
Best Historical Reconstruction / Compilation Film	Anna Vaazhigirar	Tamil	Producer: Tamil Nadu Films Division; Director: Tamil Nadu Films Division	₹ 10,000/- Each
Best Historical Reconstruction / Compilation Film	Citation: For integrating various cinematic forms to present a strong portrait of Annadurai.			
Best Film on Social Issues	Malli	Tamil	Producer: Film and TV Institute of Tamil Nadu; Director: R. Madhava Krisshnan	₹ 10,000/- Each
Best Film on Social Issues	Citation: For its original reflection on the subject of sex-workers.			
Best Educational / Motivational / Instructional Film	Silent Scream	English	Producer: Vivek K. Kumar; Director: Vikram K. Kumar	₹ 10,000/- Each
Best Educational / Motivational / Instructional Film	Citation: For its daring attempt to shake people out of their apathy towards youth in distress.			
Best Exploration / Adventure Film	Malana – In Search Of	English	Producer: Neo Films; Director: Vivek Mohan	₹ 10,000/- Each
Best Exploration / Adventure Film	Citation: For its in-depth and detailed unearthing of a people isolated in time.			
Best Investigative Film	Saga of Darkness	Bengali	Producer: Creative Image; Director: Gautam Sen	₹ 10,000/- Each
Best Investigative Film	Citation: For its courageous expose of an inhuman practice and state apathy.			
Best Animation Film	Education Only Her Future	Only Music	Producer: Arun Gongade for Films Division; Director: Arun Gongade for Films Division; Animator: Arun Gongade for Films Division	₹ 10,000/- Each
Best Animation Film	Citation: For its imaginative use of technique to make a strong statement for the education of the girl-child.			
Best Short Fiction Film	Jee Karta Tha	Hindi	Producer: Mohan Agashe for Films Division; Director: Hansa Thapliyal	₹ 10,000/- Each
Best Short Fiction Film	Citation: For its brilliant originality in delineating a small town milieu and in evolving a new cinematic idiom.			
Best Film on Family Welfare	N. M. No. 367 – Sentence of Silence	English	Producer: Y. N. Engineer for Films Division; Director: Joshy Joseph for Films Division	₹ 10,000/- Each
Best Film on Family Welfare	Citation: For its strong redefining of the family ethos in changing social circumstances of the Indian christian community.			
Best Cinematography	In The Forest Hangs a Bridge	English	Cameraman: Ranjan Palit; Laboratory Processing: Prasad Film Laboratories	₹ 10,000/- Each
Best Cinematography	Citation: For his perception of images to define a style that illustrates the harmony in the film.			
Best Audiography	Kumar Talkies	Hindi	Satheesh P. M.	₹ 10,000/-
Best Audiography	Citation: For a sound design which evokes a vision of an era fading away.			
Best Editing	In The Forest Hangs a Bridge	English	Reena Mohan	₹ 10,000/-
Best Editing	Citation: For weaving a narrative imbued with lyricism of life.			
Best Music Direction	A Painter of Eloquent Silence: Ganesh Pyne	English	Biswadeb Dasgupta	₹ 10,000/-
Best Music Direction	Citation: For enriching the visuals with a contemplative sense of rhythm.			
Special Jury Award	Faqir	Hindi	Pawan Malhotra (Actor)	₹ 10,000/-
Special Jury Award	Citation: For superb restraint in portraying of Innocence, in Gautom Ghose's film Faqir.			
Special Mention	Jee Karta Tha	Hindi	Unni Vijayan (Director)	Certificate Only
Special Mention	Citation: For his realisation of an innovative and a personalised style of constructing the film.			

=== Best Writing on Cinema ===
The awards aim at encouraging study and appreciation of cinema as an art form and dissemination of information and critical appreciation of this art-form through publication of books, articles, reviews etc.

==== Juries ====
A committee headed by M. T. Vasudevan Nair was appointed to evaluate the writing on Indian cinema. Following were the jury members:

- Jury Members
  - M. T. Vasudevan Nair (Chairperson) • Githa Hariharan • Sanjit Narwekar

==== Golden Lotus Award ====
Official Name: Swarna Kamal

All the awardees are awarded with 'Golden Lotus Award (Swarna Kamal)' and cash prize.

Name of Award	Name of Book	Language	Awardee(s)	Cash prize
Best Book on Cinema	Cinemaee Bhasha Aur Hindi Samvadon Ka Vishleshan	Hindi	Author: Kishore Vaswani; Publisher: Hindi Book Centre	₹ 15,000/- Each
Best Book on Cinema	Citation: For its taking on a new area of study, and for its original analysis of the evolution of language in Hindi cinema, drawing links with Indian theatre and literature.			
Best Film Critic		English	Meenakshi Shedde	₹ 15,000/-
Best Film Critic	Citation: For her lucid and objective criticism. She goes beyond the evaluation of a film in her attempt to place it in its social milieu, and her work reflects a good grasp of the aesthetics of cinema.			

==== Special Mention ====
All the award winners are awarded with Certificate of Merit.

Name of Award	Name of Book	Language	Awardee(s)	Cash prize
Special Mention (Book on Cinema)	Communication Cinema Development	English	Author: Gaston Roberge	Certificate Only
Special Mention (Book on Cinema)	Citation: For his book Communication Cinema Development which brings a multidisciplinary approach to bear on the subject of film.			

=== Awards not given ===
Following were the awards not given as no film was found to be suitable for the award:

- Best Feature Film in Manipuri
- Best Non-Feature Film Direction
- Best Scientific Film
- Best Promotional Film
- Best Agricultural Film
