= National Film Award for Best Punjabi Feature Film =

Indian film award

- Description: Best Punjabi feature film of the year
- Sponsored by: National Film Development Corporation of India
- Formerly called: President's Silver Medal for Best Feature Film in Punjabi (1962–1964); National Film Award for Best Feature Film in Punjabi (1967–2021)
- Rewards: Rajat Kamal (Silver Lotus); ₹2,00,000
- First award: 1962
- Most recent winner: Godday Godday Chaa (2023)

The National Film Award for Best Punjabi Feature Film is one of the National Film Awards of India presented annually by the National Film Development Corporation of India. It is one of several awards presented for feature films and awarded with Rajat Kamal (Silver Lotus). Since the 70th National Film Awards, the name was changed to "Best Punjabi Feature Film".

The National Film Awards, established in 1954, are the most prominent film awards in India that merit the best of the Indian cinema. The ceremony also presents awards for films in various regional languages.

Produced and directed by Krishnan Kumar, the 1962 film Chaudhari Karnail Singh was honoured with the first president's silver medal for Best Feature Film in Punjabi.

== Winners ==
Award includes 'Rajat Kamal' (Silver Lotus) and cash prize. Following are the award winners over the years:

Awards legends
*	President's Silver Medal for Best Feature Film
*	Certificate of Merit for the Second Best Feature Film
*	Certificate of Merit for the Third Best Feature Film
*	Certificate of Merit for the Best Feature Film
*	Indicates a joint award for that year

List of award films, showing the year (award ceremony), producer(s) and director(s)
Year	Film(s)	Producer(s)	Director(s)	Refs.
1962 (10th)	Chaudhari Karnail Singh	Krishnan Kumar	Krishnan Kumar	
1964 (12th)	Jagga	K. B. Chadha	Jugal Kishore	
1964 (12th)	Sassi Punnu	Filmistan Pvt. Ltd.	S. P. Bakshi	
1967 (15th)	Sutlej De Kande	P. P. Maheshwary	P. P. Maheshwary	
1969 (17th)	Nanak Nam Jahaz Hai	Pannalal Maheshwary	Ram Maheshwary	
1980 (28th)	Chann Pardesi	Swarn Sedha, Baldev Gill And J. S. Cheema	Chitrartha Singh	
1989 (37th)	Marhi Da Deeva	NFDC	Surinder Singh	
1993 (41st)	Kachehri	Vijay Tandon	Ravindra Peepat	
1997 (45th)	Main Maa Punjab Dee	Devender Walia	Balwant Dullat	
1998 (46th)	Shaheed-E-Mohabbat	Manjeet Maan	Manoj Punj	
2004 (52nd)	Des Hoyaa Pardes	Manjeet Maan	Manoj Punj	
2005 (53rd)	Baghi	Gaj Deol	Sukhminder Dhanjal	
2006 (54th)	Waris Shah: Ishq Daa Waaris	Sai Productions	Manoj Punj	
2011 (59th)	Anhe Ghore Da Daan	NFDC	Gurvinder Singh	
2012 (60th)	Nabar	Jasbir Singh and Sonu Kaur	Rajeev Sharma	
2014 (62nd)	Punjab 1984	Gunbir Sidhu and Manmord Sidhu	Anurag Singh	
2015 (63rd)	Chauthi Koot	NFDC and Kartikeya Singh	Gurvinder Singh	
2018 (66th)	Harjeeta	Villagers Film Studio	Vijay Kumar Arora	
2019 (67th)	Rabb Da Radio 2	Vehli Janta Films	Sharandeep Singh	
2022 (70th)	Bhagi Di Dhee	G-Next Media	Mukesh Gautam	
2023 (71st)	Godday Godday Chaa	VH Entertainment and Zee Studios	Vijay Kumar Arora	
