= Suraj Sanim =

Indian screenwriter

- Occupation: Screenwriter

Suraj Sanim is an Indian screenwriter. He has written screenplays, dialogues and stories of many Hindi and Punjabi films like Shaheed-E-Mohabbat Boota Singh (1999), Sukhmani: Hope for Life (2010).

== Filmography ==
- Heera Panna (1973)
- Bullet (1976)
- Des Pardes (1978)
- Lahu Ke Do Rang (1979)
- Janam (1985)
- Thikana (1987)
- Kaash (1987)
- Daddy (1989)
- Awaargi (1990)
- C.I.D. (1990)
- Dil Aashna Hai (1992)
- Shaheed-E-Mohabbat Boota Singh (1999)
- Zindagi Khoobsurat Hai (2002)
- Des Hoyaa Pardes (2004)
- Waris Shah: Ishq Daa Waaris (2006)
- Sukhmani: Hope for Life (2010)
