= Truck Driver =

A truck driver or trucker is a person who drives trucks or lorries.

Truck Driver may also refer to:

- Truck Driver (1970 film), a 1970 Indian Hindi-language film
- Truck Driver (1976 film), a 1976 Pakistani Punjabi-language film, featuring the actress Aasia
- Truck Driver (1997 film), a 1997 Indian Punjabi-language film by Ravinder Ravi
- Truck Driver (1994 film), a Nepalese film
- Truck Driver (2011 film), an Indian Bhojpuri-language film
  - Truck Driver 2, its 2016 sequel
- Truck Driver (documentary), film on which sound director Shajith Koyeri worked
- Truck Driver (video game), 2019 Dutch video game
