= Dil Vil Pyaar Vyaar =

- Directed by: Manjeet Maan
- Written by: Dheeraj Rattan; Amberdeep Singh
- Produced by: Manjeet Maan
- Starring: Gurdas Maan; Neeru Bajwa; Jassi Gill; Manav Vij; Raj Jhinger; Rajiv Thakur
- Cinematography: Krishna Ramanan
- Edited by: Omkarnath Bhakri
- Music by: Jatinder Shah
- Production company: Sai Productions
- Release date: 2 May 2014
- Running time: 146 minutes
- Country: India
- Language: Punjabi

Dil Vil Pyaar Vyaar is a 2014 Punjabi Family drama film directed by Manjeet Maan featuring Gurdas Maan, Neeru Bajwa, Jassi Gill, Manav Vij and Rajiv Thakur.

== Plot ==
Dil Vil Pyaar Vyaar is a story of four brothers where the eldest one, Agam, takes care of his younger brothers and wants them to get married. However, the brothers disapprove of this and want Agam to get married first who in turn is hesitant of going for marriage because of an incident that took place in his life years ago.

== Cast ==
- Gurdas Maan as Agam
- Neeru Bajwa as Prabhjeet
- Juhi Chawla as Simran
- Manav Vij as Biba
- Jassi Gill as Deepa
- Rajiv Thakur as Raja
- Raj Jhinger as Channi
- Meher Vij as Simran
- Shruti Sodhi
- Khushdeed Maan as Jasjeet

== Soundtrack ==
Dil Vil Pyaar Vyaar

Soundtrack album by Jatinder Shah & Gurdas Maan
- Released: 14 April 2014
- Genre: Feature film soundtrack
- Length: 32:58
- Language: Punjabi
- Label: Saga Music
External audio
- Audio Jukebox on YouTube

The soundtrack of Dil Vil Pyaar Vyaar consists of 8 songs composed by Gurdas Maan and Jatinder Shah, the lyrics to which were provided by Kumaar, Abdul Sattar Niazi and Gurdas Maan himself.

Tracklist
No.	Title	Lyrics	Music	Singer(s)	Length
1.	"Saanu Te Aisa Mahi"	Gurdas Maan	Gurdas Maan	Sunidhi Chauhan & Harshdeep Kaur	05:01
2.	"Main Lajpalan De"	Abdul Sattar Niazi	Gurdas Maan	Gurdas Maan	05:50
3.	"Mitran Da Dil Nachda"	Gurdas Maan	Gurdas Maan	Gurdas Maan & Jassi Gill	03:21
4.	"Tamanna Meri"	Gurpinder Singh	Jatinder Shah	Jassi Gill	04:48
5.	"Thumka Laga Lai Saade Naal"	Gurdas Maan	Gurdas Maan	Gurdas Maan & Sunidhi Chauhan	03:21
6.	"Tere Ishq Ne"	Kumaar	Jatinder Shah	Gurdas Maan & Shreya Ghoshal	04:42
7.	"Teri Akh Nu Salamaan Hundiyan"	Gurdas Maan	Gurdas Maan	Gurdas Maan	03:10
8.	"Tere Ishq Ne" (Sad Version)	Kumaar	Jatinder Shah	Gurdas Maan, Shreya Ghoshal & Juhi Chawla	03:18
Total length:					32:58

== Awards and nominations ==
Award	Date of Ceremony	Category	Recipient(s) and nominee(s)	Result	Ref.
PTC Punjabi Film Awards	17 March 2015	Star Forever Award	Gurdas Maan	Won	
PTC Punjabi Film Awards	17 March 2015	Family Film of the Year Award	Manjeet Maan	Won	
