= Bullet (1976 film) =

1976 Indian film

- Directed by: Vijay Anand
- Written by: Suraj Sanim
- Produced by: Vijay Anand
- Starring: Dev Anand; Parveen Babi; Rakesh Roshan; Kabir Bedi
- Music by: R. D. Burman
- Release date: 28 December 1976
- Country: India
- Language: Hindi

Bullet is a 1976 Indian Hindi-language action thriller film produced and directed by Vijay Anand, with music by R. D. Burman and lyrics by Anand Bakshi. The film stars Dev Anand, Parveen Babi, Rakesh Roshan, Shreeram Lagoo and Kabir Bedi. The movie was made at the twenty-fifth anniversary of Navketan Production company. This was coming back of duo brothers Dev Anand and Vijay Anand. Written by Suraj Sanim, the film is inspired by the James Hadley Chase thriller Just Another Sucker (1961). this was the last movie the two brothers worked together in.

== Plot ==
Durgaprasad, owner of a shipping company, but whose main business is to cheat innocent people. He is pursued by Inspector Dharamdev. Dharamdev is trying to nail Durgaprasad for his misdeeds. He befriends his personal secretary Sapna, to meet his goal.

Initially hurt and annoyed, Sapna decides to help him when Durgaprasad urges her to please one of his associates. Dharamdev gets hold of some confidential files of Durgaprasad, but on the way, is overpowered by his goons and falsely implicated in a murder case.

Dharamdev's track record and timely help from Inspector Rajesh facilitates his release, after which he vows to finish Durgaprasad with a bullet he keeps exclusively for him, Dharamdev warns Durgaprasad. With the entry of Mala, lover of Durgaprasad, Seth Ghanshyamdas and Roshi, there is a twist in the story with suspense enveloping the narrative.

Dharamdev is initially suspected, but later it is revealed that Durgaprasad is the murderer, with the climax shot at Bombay Hospital, where the former shoots the latter.

== Cast ==
- Dev Anand as Inspector Dharamdev
- Parveen Babi as Sapna
- Rakesh Roshan as Inspector Rajesh
- Kabir Bedi as Durgaprasad "D.P."
- Shreeram Lagoo as Seth Ghanshyamdas
- Sonia Sahni as Mala
- Jyoti Bakshi as Roshi
- Jagdeep as Zafarullah Khan
- Mohan Sherry as Jagmohan

== Soundtrack ==
Song	Singer
"Bullet Bullet Bullet Bullet"	Kishore Kumar
"Chori Chori Chupke Chupke, Tere Mere Bin Is Kamre Men"	Kishore Kumar, Asha Bhosle
"Jab Tum Chale Jaoge"	Lata Mangeshkar
"Peene Ke Baad"	Asha Bhosle
