= Zindagi Khoobsoorat Hai =

- Poster
- Directed by: Manoj Punj
- Written by: Suraj Sanim
- Produced by: Manjeet Maan
- Starring: Gurdas Mann; Tabu; Divya Dutta; Rajit Kapur; Ashish Vidyarthi; Sonu Sood
- Cinematography: Ravi Bhat
- Edited by: Omkar Bharki
- Music by: Anand Raj Anand; Hemant Parashar
- Release date: 4 October 2002
- Country: India
- Language: Hindi

Zindagi Khoobsoorat Hai is a 2002 Indian Hindi-language romantic drama film directed by Manoj Punj. It stars Gurdas Maan, Tabu, Divya Dutta, Ashish Vidyarthi, Sonu Sood, and Rajit Kapur.

== Cast ==
- Gurdas Maan as Amar
- Tabu as Shalu
- Ashish Vidyarthi as Gul Baloch
- Rajit Kapur as Yusuf Zayed Hussein
- Divya Dutta as Kitu
- Akash Khurana
- Bharati Achrekar
- Chetana Das as Amar's mother
- Dinesh Hingoo as Shah
- Chandini Pandit as Jameela
- Navni Parihar
- Deepak Qazir
- Sonu Sood

== Soundtrack ==
Track #	Song	Singer(s)
1	"Zindagi Khoobsoorat Hai"	Udit Narayan
2	"Yaara Dildara Ve"	Alka Yagnik, Gurdaas Maan
3	"Tum Gaye Gum Nahin"	Manpreet
4	"Choodiyan"	Anand Raj Anand, Mohammad Aziz, Sunidhi Chauhan
5	"One-Two-Three-Four"	Gurdas Maan
6	"Geet Dhun Sur Sargam"	Sonu Nigam
7	"Ishq Kiya To Jaana"	Gurdas Maan

== Awards ==
- National Film Award for Best Male Playback Singer - Udit Narayan
