= National Film Award for Best Male Playback Singer =

Indian film award

- National Award for contributions to Indian Cinema
- 2024 recipient: Abhay Jodhpurkar
- Awarded for: Best Male Playback Singer for feature film for a year
- Sponsored by: National Film Development Corporation of India
- Formerly called: Best Playback Singer of the Year (1967)
- Rewards: Rajat Kamal (Silver Lotus); ₹2,00,000
- First award: 1967
- Most recent winner: Abhay Jodhpurkar, Gharat Ganpati (2024)

Highlights
- Most wins: K. J. Yesudas (8)

The National Film Award for Best Male Playback Singer is an honour presented annually at the National Film Awards of India since 1968 to a male playback singer for the best renditions of songs from films within the Indian film industry. The award was first granted to Mahendra Kapoor in 1967. The singers whose performances have won awards have worked in nine major languages: Hindi (19 awards), Malayalam (9 awards), Bengali (7 awards), Telugu and Marathi (6 awards each), Tamil and Kannada (4 awards each), and Punjabi (1 award).

The singer with the most awards in this category is K. J. Yesudas with eight wins for three languages (Malayalam, Telugu and Hindi), followed by S. P. Balasubrahmanyam who won six times for four languages (Telugu, Hindi, Kannada and Tamil). Udit Narayan and Shankar Mahadevan follow next, winning three awards each. The singers Manna Dey, Hemanta Kumar Mukhopadhyay, M. G. Sreekumar, Hariharan and Arijit Singh have bagged this award twice.

== Recipients ==
List of award recipients, showing the year (award ceremony), song(s), film(s) and language(s)
Year	Recipient(s)	Song(s)	Film(s)	Language(s)	Refs.
1967 (15th)	Mahendra Kapoor	"Mere Desh Ki Dharti"	Upkar	Hindi	
1968 (16th)	Manna Dey	"Jhanak Jhanak Tori Baaje Paayaliya"	Mere Huzoor	Hindi	
1969 (17th)	Sachin Dev Burman	"Safal Hogi Teri Aradhana"	Aradhana	Hindi	
1970 (18th)	Manna Dey	• "Ae Bhai Zara Dekh Ke Chalo" • "Ja Khushi Ora Bole"	• Mera Naam Joker • Nishi Padma	• Hindi • Bengali	
1971 (19th)	Hemant Kumar	–	Nimantran	Bengali	
1972 (20th)	K. J. Yesudas	"Manushyan Mathangale"	Achanum Bappayum	Malayalam	
1973 (21st)	K. J. Yesudas	"Padmatheerthame Unaroo"	Gayathri	Malayalam	
1974 (22nd)	Mukesh	"Kahi Baar Yoon Bhi Dekha Hai"	Rajnigandha	Hindi	
1975 (23rd)	M. Balamuralikrishna	–	Hamsageethe	Kannada	
1976 (24th)	K. J. Yesudas	"Gori Tera Gaon Bada Pyara"	Chitchor	Hindi	
1977 (25th)	Mohammed Rafi	"Kya Hua Tera Wada"	Hum Kisise Kum Naheen	Hindi	
1978 (26th)	Shimoga Subbanna	"Kaadu Kudure Odi Banditta"	Kaadu Kudure	Kannada	
1979 (27th)	S. P. Balasubrahmanyam	"Omkara Naadaanusandhanamou"	Sankarabharanam	Telugu	
1980 (28th)	Anup Ghoshal	"Aaha Ke Anondo"	Hirak Rajar Deshe	Bengali	
1981 (29th)	S. P. Balasubrahmanyam	"Tere Mere Beech Mein"	Ek Duuje Ke Liye	Hindi	
1982 (30th)	K. J. Yesudas	"Akasha Desana"	Meghasandesam	Telugu	
1983 (31st)	S. P. Balasubrahmanyam	"Vedam Anuvanuvuna Naadam"	Saagara Sangamam	Telugu	
1984 (32nd)	Bhimsen Joshi	"Thumak Thumak Pag"	Ankahee	Hindi	
1985 (33rd)	Jayachandran	"Sivasankara Sarva Saranya Vibho"	Sree Narayana Guru	Malayalam	
1986 (34th)	Hemant Kumar	–	Lalan Fakir	Bengali	
1987 (35th)	K. J. Yesudas	"Unnikale Oru Kadha Parayam"	Unnikale Oru Kadha Parayam	Malayalam	
1988 (36th)	S. P. Balasubrahmanyam	"Cheppaalani Undi"	Rudraveena	Telugu	
1989 (37th)	Ajoy Chakrabarty	–	Chhandaneer	Bengali	
1990 (38th)	M. G. Sreekumar	"Nadharoopini Shankari Pahimam"	His Highness Abdullah	Malayalam	
1991 (39th)	K. J. Yesudas	"Ramakadha Gaanalayam"	Bharatham	Malayalam	
1992 (40th)	Rajkumar	"Naadamaya Ee Lokavella"	Jeevana Chaitra	Kannada	
1993 (41st)	K. J. Yesudas	"Ksheera Saagara"	Sopanam	Malayalam	
1994 (42nd)	P. Unni Krishnan	• "Ennavale" • "Uyirum Neeye"	• Kaadhalan • Pavithra	Tamil	
1995 (43rd)	S. P. Balasubrahmanyam	"Umandu Ghumandu Ghana Garaje Badara"	Sangeetha Sagara Ganayogi Panchakshara Gavai	Kannada	
1996 (44th)	S. P. Balasubrahmanyam	"Thanga Thamarai"	Minsara Kanavu	Tamil	
1997 (45th)	Hariharan	"Mere Dushman Mere Bhai"	Border	Hindi	
1998 (46th)	Sanjeev Abhyankar	"Suno Re Bhaila"	Godmother	Hindi	
1999 (47th)	M. G. Sreekumar	"Chanthu Pottum"	Vasanthiyum Lakshmiyum Pinne Njaanum	Malayalam	
2000 (48th)	Shankar Mahadevan	"Yenna Solla Pogirai"	Kandukondain Kandukondain	Tamil	
2001 (49th)	Udit Narayan	• "Mitwa" • "Jaane Kyon"	• Lagaan • Dil Chahta Hai	Hindi	
2002 (50th)	Udit Narayan	"Chhote Chhote Sapne"	Zindagi Khoobsoorat Hai	Hindi	
2003 (51st)	Sonu Nigam	"Kal Ho Naa Ho"	Kal Ho Naa Ho	Hindi	
2004 (52nd)	Udit Narayan	"Yeh Taara Woh Taara"	Swades	Hindi	
2005 (53rd)	Naresh Iyer	"Roobaroo"	Rang De Basanti	Hindi	
2006 (54th)	Gurdas Maan	"Couplets of Heer"	Waris Shah: Ishq Daa Waaris	Punjabi	
2007 (55th)	Shankar Mahadevan	"Maa"	Taare Zameen Par	Hindi	
2008 (56th)	Hariharan	"Jeev Dangla Gungla Rangla Asa"	Jogwa	Marathi	
2009 (57th)	Rupam Islam	"Ei To Ami"	Mahanagar@Kolkata	Bengali	
2010 (58th)	Suresh Wadkar	"Hey Bhaskara Kshitijavari Ya"	Mee Sindhutai Sapkal	Marathi	
2011 (59th)	Anand Bhate	"Chinmaya Sakal Hridaya"	Balgandharva	Marathi	
2012 (60th)	Shankar Mahadevan	"Bolo Na"	Chittagong	Hindi	
2013 (61st)	Rupankar Bagchi	"E Tumi Kemon Tumi"	Jaatishwar	Bengali	
2014 (62nd)	Sukhwinder Singh	"Bismil"	Haider	Hindi	
2015 (63rd)	Mahesh Kale	"Aruni Kirani"	Katyar Kaljat Ghusali	Marathi	
2016 (64th)	Sundarayyar	"Jasmine-U"	Joker	Tamil	
2017 (65th)	K. J. Yesudas	"Poy Maranja Kalam"	Viswasapoorvam Mansoor	Malayalam	
2018 (66th)	Arijit Singh	"Binte Dil"	Padmaavat	Hindi	
2019 (67th)	B Praak	"Teri Mitti"	Kesari	Hindi	
2020 (68th)	Rahul Deshpande	"Kaivalya Gaan"	Me Vasantrao	Marathi	
2021 (69th)	Kaala Bhairava	"Komuram Bheemudo"	RRR	Telugu	
2022 (70th)	Arijit Singh	"Kesariya"	Brahmāstra: Part One – Shiva	Hindi	
2023 (71st)	P V N S Rohit	"Premisthunna"	Baby	Telugu	
2024 (72nd)	Abhay Jodhpurkar	"Navsachi Gauri Mazi"	Gharat Ganpati	Marathi	

== See also ==
- National Film Award for Best Female Playback Singer
