= Waris Shah: Ishq Daa Waaris =

2006 Indian Punjabi-language film

- Directed by: Manoj Punj
- Written by: Suraj Sanim
- Produced by: Manjeet Maan (Sai Productions)
- Starring: Gurdas Mann; Juhi Chawla; Divya Dutta; Sushant Singh; Gurkirtan
- Music by: Jaidev Kumar
- Release date: October 6, 2006
- Running time: 138 minutes
- Country: India
- Language: Punjabi

Waris Shah: Ishq Daa Waaris is a 2006 Indian Punjabi language film, directed by Manoj Punj, starring Gurdas Maan, Juhi Chawla and Divya Dutta in lead roles. It is about the life of legendary Punjabi poet Waris Shah during the times when he wrote the poem Heer. The movie was internationally acclaimed and won four awards at the 54th National Film Awards.

== Plot ==
Mughal Ruler Aurangzeb bans music in India, since he believes that music turns a person away from God. This ban continues for the next generations. Music lovers and singers start living in secret places away from cities. Baba Makhdum (Mukesh Rishi) is staying near Kasur with some of his followers and practices music; Waris Shah (Gurdas Maan) comes and joins him. Baba Makhdum tells Waris that he appreciates his talent, but asks Waris to feel the pain to get the best out of him.

On Baba Ji's suggestion Waris moves to the village of Malkan Hans, where music is not banned. The Mughal Ruler finds out about Baba Makhdum and kills him. Waris Shah meets Bhaagpari (Juhi Chawla) in Malkan Hans. The two fall in love. Saabo (Divya Dutta), too, gets attracted to Waris Shah, and is willing to do anything to get Waris. Waris starts living in the masjid of the village and starts working on the poem Heer. Village youngsters get attracted to his work and become his fans.

The Qazi (Gurkirtan) of the village becomes furious after seeing Waris's popularity. Waris is arrested by the area of Subedar after complaints from the Qazi. Waris convinces the Subedar that by singing he is worshiping God. Bhaagpari is forced to marry Saabo's brother (Sushant Singh) as they were betrothed at a young age. Waris Shah realizes that to feel pain and complete Heer, he must let Bhaagpari go. On the other hand, Saabo tries her best but fails to get Waris. Finally she accepts her fate and lets Waris go. Waris and Bhaagpari are accused of having a sexual relationship without marriage. They prove their innocence by walking unharmed on burning coals. In the end Waris leaves the village upon the completion of Heer.

== Cast ==
Actor/Actress	Role
Gurdas Maan	Waris Shah
Juhi Chawla	Bhagpari
Divya Dutta	Saabo
Sushant Singh	Inayat (Saabo's brother)
Satwant Kaur	Saabo's mother
Chetana Das	Bhagpari's mother
Deeba	Saabo's mother
Mukesh Rishi	Muin-Ud-Din Makhdoom (Waris Shah's Ustad)
Gurkirtan	Qazi

== Awards ==
The film won the most number of awards (4) at the 54th National Film Awards along with Lage Raho Munna Bhai. It won Best Feature Film in Punjabi (received by Producer: Sai Productions, Director: Manoj Punj), Best Male Playback Singer (awarded to Gurdas Maan - "Couplets of Heer"), Best Art Direction (presented to Rashid Rangrez) and Best Costume Design (felicitated to Manjeet Maan).

== Music ==
Waris Shah: Ishq Daa Waaris featured 8 soundtracks that were composed by Jaidev Kumar. In the film, the characters of Waris Shah, Bhagpari, and Saabo are seen singing frequently on the screen. Being a respected singer, Gurdas Maan sang for himself, while Alka Yagnik and Kavita Krishnamurthy lent their voices to Juhi Chawla and Divya Dutta respectively. Krishna Beura was dubbed for a song picturized on Mukesh Rishi.

Soundtrack	Singer(s)	Duration (in minutes)
"Couplets Of Heer"	Gurdas Maan	12:49
"Khaas Shamma Ajj Tere Lai"	Gurdas Maan, Kavita Krishnamurti	5:26
"Ve Kabootra Ve Kasda"	Gurdas Maan, Alka Yagnik	4:28
"Guddiyaan Guddiyaan"	Alka Yagnik, Kavita Krishnamurti	4:51
"Allah Hu Toomba Kehnda"	Gurdas Maan	5:47
"Katra Mila Samandar Se"	Krishna Beura	2:50
"Yeh Imtihaane Ishq"	Gurdas Maan	3:52
"Dosto Lo Aa Gayee Ghari"	Gurdas Maan	5:12

== See also ==
- Waaris Shah
