= Gurkirtan Chauhan =

- Born: 6 September 1951; Govindpura, Punjab, India
- Died: 2 March 2009 (aged 57)
- Other names: Guruji, Kirat
- Occupation: Actor
- Years active: 1984–2009
- Spouse: Paramjit Kaur

Gurkirtan Chauhan (6 September 1951 – 2 March 2009), also credited as simply Gurkirtan, was an Indian actor who worked in Punjabi and Hindi films. He played various roles in many films such as Taare Zameen Par, Tabaahi, Jatt Jeona Mour, Waris Shah: Ishq Daa Waaris, and Shaheed-E-Mohabbat Boota Singh.

After having obtained a degree in civil engineering from the Chandigarh College of Architecture, he gravitated towards film, initially beginning his acting career in theatre. His first appreciated role was of Dogar, a villain in the hit film Jatt Jeona Mour.

== Personal life and death ==
He married Paramjit Kaur in 1984. Chauhan died due to cardiac arrest on 3 March 2009. He is survived by two children.

== Filmography ==
- Jatt Jeona Mour (1991) as Choudhary Ahmed Dogar
- Putt Saradaran De (1992) as Succha
- Mirza Jatt (1992) as Shameer Khan
- Baghi Soormay (1993) as Police Officer
- Vairi (1994) as Bandemaar/Bhoonda
- Mera Punjab (1994) as Sujaan Singh
- Ucha Pind (1994) as Zaildaar Dayal Singh
- Dhee Jatt Di (1995) as Shamsher Singh Sarang
- Pratigya (1995) as Laakha
- Zaildaar (1995) as Babbar
- Bagawat (1995) as Editor Chander Mohan (CM)
- Lambardaar (1995) as Jaildaar Jung Singh
- Tabaahi (1996) as Mantri Balwant Singh
- Rab Dian Rakhan (1996) as Ajit 'Bava' Prasad
- Ishq Na Pooche Jaat (1997) as Chaudhary Arjan Singh
- Jung Da Maidan (1997)
- Sardari (1997)
- Khoon Da Daaj (1998) as Jaila
- Shaheed-e-Mohabbat Boota Singh (1999) as Boota's Uncle
- Badla... The Revenge (2003) as Bagga
- Des Hoya Pardes (2004) as SHO Amarjeet Singh
- Shaheed Uddham Singh (2004) (Hindi film)
- Mehndi Wale Hath (2006) as Massa Chichar
- Rabb Ne Banaiyan Jodiean (2006)
- Waris Shah: Ishq Daa Waaris (2004) as Qaazi
- Dil Ki Kare (2006) as Sarpanch (TV film)
- Kaun Kise Da Beli (2007) as Kewal Kishen
- Taare Zameen Par (2007) as Housemaster (Hindi film)
- Vidroh (2007) as Prataap Singh
- Namastey London (2007) as Father (Hindi film)
- Hashar: A Love Story (2008) as SHO
- Majaajan (2008) as Bachan Singh
- Akhiyaan Udeekdian (2009) as Rajveer Singh
- Luv U Bobby (2009) as Sherjit
- Dev D (2009) as Satpal Dhillon – Dev's dad (Hindi film)
- Jawani Zindabaad (2009)
- Sukhmani: Hope for Life (2010)
- Chak Jawana (2010) as Sarpanch Balkar Singh
