= Sai Productions =

Film production house based in Mumbai

Sai Production Private Limited
- Type: Private limited
- Industry: Film production
- Founded: 1995
- Headquarters: Mumbai, India
- Owner: Manjeet Maan; Gurdas Maan

Sai Production Private Limited is an Indian film production house based in Mumbai, owned by singer-songwriter and actor, Gurdas Maan and his wife Manjeet Maan. The company began with TV software but, since 1998, has produced several award winning Punjabi-language films like Shaheed-E-Mohabbat Boota Singh, Zindagi Khoobsoorat Hai, Des Hoyaa Pardes and Waris Shah: Ishq Daa Waaris. Sai Creations and Sai Lok Sangeet are its sister concerns.

== Awards ==
Its films have got several National Film Awards, including Best Actor, Best Male Playback Singer and the Special Jury Award.

Shaheed-E-Mohabbat was its first major film that was very successful both commercially and critically. It won the President's National Award and got selected for the Indian Panorama.

Zindagi Khoobsoorat Hai won the National Film Award for Best Playback Singer and Des Hoyaa Pardes also got many awards including Special Jury Award for Gurdas Maan and was selected as the best Punjabi-language film of 2005 by the Indian government.

Waris Shah: Ishq Daa Waaris won four National Film Awards.
