= Sukhmani: Hope for Life =

Sukhmani
- Directed by: Manjeet Maan
- Written by: Gurdas Maan
- Produced by: UK Box Office; Gurik Maan; Sai Lok Sangeet
- Starring: Gurdas Maan; Juhi Chawla
- Music by: Jaidev Kumar
- Distributed by: UK Box Office
- Release date: 12 February 2010
- Running time: 162 minutes
- Country: India
- Language: Punjabi

Sukhmani – Hope for Life (transl. Peace of mind) is a 2010 Indian Punjabi-language film directed by Manjeet Maan and starring Gurdas Maan, Juhi Chawla, Divya Dutta and Bhagwant Mann. It was produced by Gurdas, Manjeet's husband, and their son Gurikk Maan. It has been made by Maan's own production company - Sai Lok Sangeet, with the screenplay by Irshad Kamil, music by Jaidev Kumar and lyrics written by Gurdas Maan. The music for the film was released on 6 January 2010 and includes vocals from Gurdas Maan, Shreya Ghoshal and for the first time ever in her career - Juhi Chawla has sung alongside Gurdas Maan in a duet for the songs "Preeto " and "Nanhi Si Gudiya".

The film was distributed by the UK Box Office, which also helped in producing the film.

== Synopsis ==
Sukhmani- Hope For Life is a story based on the journey of Major Kuldeep Singh, played by Gurdas Maan, a decorated officer of the Para Battalion, who overcomes personal trauma and social indignity to uphold the morals of the army and the honour of a woman rejected by society and family, while keeping alive the memory of his beloved daughter Sukhmani.

On the day when the valley of Jammu and Kashmir is bloodied by the killings of his wife and daughter at the hands of terrorists, Major. Kuldeep Singh's life is thrown into disarray. To maintain his sanity and avoid depression, he returns to his duty, fighting the terrorists with renewed vigor and the need to avenge his family. When, for the second time, he fails to save the life of an innocent girl who becomes a victim of terrorism, he becomes a broken man. When duty calls again, he goes out to repatriate civilians from the Wagah Border. After meeting Reshma, he decides that protecting her from social stigma and from the intentions of his own comrade has become his goal in life. He faces dishonour and social exclusion, but fights back for his rights, the rights of a woman dispelled by society and the future of a little girl.

Sukhmani shows us that both good and evil lie within each of us, however when faced with exceptional circumstances, each human acts differently. It shows us that sometimes we have to make choices that are not always accepted by society. Sukhmani shows us that there is hope for life.

== Cast ==
- Gurdas Maan as Major Kuldeep Singh
- Juhi Chawla as Major's wife
- Divya Dutta
- Shammi in a Guest Appearance
- Roshan Abbas
- Anita Kanwar
- Bhagwant Maan as a military man
- Anup Soni

== Awards ==
=== PTC Punjabi Film Awards 2011 ===
At first PTC Punjabi Film Awards Sukhmani won various awards under different categories .

- Best Director Award: Manjeet Mann
- Best Actress Award: Divya Dutta
- Best Editing Award: Omkarnath Bhakri
- Best Story Award: Suraj Sanim/Manoj Punj
- Critics Best Actor Award: Gurdas Mann
- Critics Best Film Award: Sukhmani – Hope for Life
