= Des Hoyaa Pardes =

- Directed by: Manoj Punj
- Screenplay by: Suraj Sanim
- Produced by: Manjeet Maan; Balkar Sandhu
- Starring: Gurdas Maan; Juhi Chawla; Divya Dutta; Anup Soni; Parmeet Sethi; Sudhir Pandey; Madhumalti Kapoor
- Edited by: Omkarnath Bhakri, Kajal Naskar (Co Director)
- Music by: Jaidev Kumar
- Production company: Sai Productions
- Release date: 23 December 2004
- Running time: 163 minutes
- Country: India
- Language: Punjabi

Des Hoyaa Pardes is a 2004 Indian Punjabi-language film, directed by Manoj Punj, starring Gurdas Maan, Juhi Chawla, Divya Dutta and Anup Soni. It won the National Award for Best Feature Film in Punjabi.

== Plot ==
In 1984, the former Indian Prime Minister, Indira Gandhi, was assassinated by her Sikh bodyguards, which led to violent backlashes against the Sikh community by radicals and the Punjab Police. During 1985, Gurshan Singh Somal lived a peaceful life as a farmer in rural Punjab, along with his elderly parents, Gurdev and Tejpal, and his unmarried sister, Guddi. Gurshan gets engaged to Jassi Sandhu, the daughter of the Station House Officer. However, Jassi's father is killed in a drive-by shooting, and a new corrupt officer named Randhawa takes over. Far from being ethical and honest, he is only concerned with fulfilling a quota of deaths of so-called terrorists by fake police encounters. Jassi and Gurshan get married as Jassi has no other relatives. When the police find a duffel bag of automatic weapons in Somal's house, they immediately arrest Gurshan and beat him up severely, even though he claims his innocence, alleging that real terrorists had forced themselves upon the family at gun-point. When a deputation from the town asks Randhawa to set him free, he does so, and the Somal family settle down. Guddi is soon to marry a young man who loves her. Then in July, 1987, Sikh terrorists gun down a bus full of non-Sikhs, setting off a shock wave in the entire country. Punjab Police are instructed to maintain order, even if it means to do away with law. A large number of Sikhs are hunted down and killed in fake police encounters, scores are arrested and tortured. Gurshan is arrested again and severely beaten up in police custody. When Guddi goes to plead with Randhawa to release him, she too is imprisoned and beaten by a burly policewoman. Gurshan's American-based friend, Darshan Singh Gill, comes to their rescue and arranges for Gurshan to visit the U.S.A. on a travel visa as a hockey player. Once in America, Gurshan applies for political asylum, and is granted one, which also permits him to sponsor Jassi, and his new-born son to America. After Jassi's arrival, Gurshan gets a job in a corner store, while Jassi works as a Gas Attendant. It is then Gurshan gets the news that his father has suffered a heart-attack and may not live long. Gurshan is ready to leave for India to be near his family in this crucial hour, but his leaving America may well revoke his political asylum, and even if he does leave America and arrives in India, there is more than a bullet from the Punjab Police awaiting him. However Gurshan manages to come India back and fulfill his sister Guddi's marriage successfully. Meanwhile he was spotted by police and they start chasing after him. At one point Gurshan gets killed by bulletshot from the police. The film ends like that Gurshan has fulfilled all his promises and how one's own nation is being alien and hard to one in these days .One's own countrymen are behaving like alien in order to fulfill their greed and selfishness.

== Music ==
Jaidev Kumar composed the music for playback singers Gurdas Maan, Jagjit Singh, Sonu Nigam, Alka Yagnik, Kavita Krishnamurthy, Bhupinder Singh, Arvinder Singh and Simi.

The music was released in November of the same year.

== Awards ==
The film received the National Award for the best Best Feature Film in Punjabi and the actor Gurdas Maan got the Special Jury Award.

== Cast ==
Actor/Actress	Role
Gurdas Maan	Gurshan Singh Somal
Juhi Chawla	Jassi Sandhu
Divya Dutta	Guddi
Sudhir Pandey	Gurdev Singh (Gursharan's father)
Madhumalti Kapoor	Tejpal Kaur (Gursharan's mother)
Parmeet Sethi	Darshan Singh
Anup Soni	SHO Randhawa

== See also ==
- Shaheed-E-Mohabbat
- Waris Shah: Ishq Daa Waaris
