= Kachehri =

- Directed by: Ravindra Peepat
- Starring: Gurdas Maan; Yograj singh Chetana Das
- Release date: 1994
- Country: India
- Language: Punjabi

Kachehri is a 1994 Punjabi language film starring Gurdas Maan, Yograj singh and Chetana Das. The playback is by Jaspinder Narula, Sadhana Sargam, Salma Agha and Gurdas Maan.
