= Shaheed-e-Mohabbat Boota Singh =

1999 Indian Punjabi-language film

- DVD cover
- Directed by: Manoj Punj
- Screenplay by: Suraj Sanim
- Produced by: Manjeet Maan>
- Starring: Gurdas Maan; Divya Dutta; Arun Bakshi; Raghuvir Yadav; Gurkirtan; B.N. Sharma
- Cinematography: Parmod Mittal
- Edited by: Omkar Bhakhri
- Music by: Amar Haldipur
- Release date: 1 January 1999
- Running time: 120 minutes
- Country: India
- Language: Punjabi

Shaheed-e-Mohabbat Boota Singh is a 1999 Indian Punjabi-language feature film based on the real-life love story of Boota Singh and Zainab, starring Gurdas Maan and Divya Dutta in the lead roles. The film is directed by Manoj Punj and produced by Manjeet Maan. Arun Bakshi, Gurkirtan and Chetana Das played supporting roles. The film won the National Film Award for Best Feature Film in Punjabi at the 46th National Film Awards.

The movie was an international hit and was screened at many national and international film festivals, including the 1999 Vancouver International Film Festival and the International Film Festival of India. It is the first film by Maan's home production, Sai Productions.

== Plot ==
Boota Singh is a Sikh veteran who served in the British Army in Burma during the Second World War. In his thirties, he returned to his village near Jalandhar. All his friends had married by then, but he had not. As his youth slipped away, he still hadn't found a wife. The hope of having a family of his own remained at the back of his mind. A trader told Boota that if he could raise 2,000 rupees, he would buy him a young bride from Uttar Pradesh or Bihar. Boota started saving every penny.

=== Boota Singh rescues a Muslim girl ===
When India gained independence in 1947 and Pakistan was formed, communal riots broke out on both sides of the newly drawn border. Boota's village was caught up in the violence.

One day, while he was working in his fields, a beautiful young Muslim girl who was being chased by an angry mob came to him for help. The youths demanded either the girl or 2,500 rupees. Boota argued that he only had 1,800 rupees, but he managed to shake them off by handing over his life's savings. His hopes of settling down and saving for a dowry were shattered when he had to use his savings to rescue Zainab. With nowhere else to go, she stayed with him.

=== Boota and Zainab get married ===
The villagers are objecting to Boota housing Zainab. They say that he should either marry her or take her to the refugee camp where people bound for Pakistan are staying. As he is much older than her, Boota decides to leave her at the camp. He prepares to send her off with a man who is heading to Pakistan and willing to marry her there. However, touched by Boota's sacrifice and humility, Zainab asks him if he is so poor that he cannot afford to give her two rotis a day. Boota Singh and Zainab then fall in love and get married. Boota's life transforms overnight. Then they have a baby girl. Boota Singh is very happy in his marriage and enjoying life.

=== The end ===
Boota's uncle had hoped that he would die unmarried, which would enable him to inherit the family property. However, he became jealous when Boota married Zainab. A few years later, when India and Pakistan agreed to deport Muslim women who had been left behind during the riots, he informed the police about Zainab, who was living in their village. While Boota was away, the police forcibly loaded Zainab onto a truck bound for a refugee camp, leaving her child behind.

She was sent to her parents' home in the village of Barki in Pakistan. Boota sold all his land and travelled illegally to Pakistan with his child. He was beaten by Zainab's relatives. They then informed the police, who brought Boota before a judge. The judge was willing to release Boota if his wife admitted to the charges, but under pressure from her family, she retracted her statement.

Devastated, Boota and his daughter threw themselves in front of an oncoming train. Boota died, but miraculously, his daughter survived. Overcome by this tragedy, Pakistani youths now hail Boota as 'Shaheed-E-Mohabbat Boota Singh' ('Martyr of Love Boota Singh'), and a memorial and trust have been set up in his name.

== Cast ==
Actor/Actress	Role
Gurdas Maan	Boota Singh
Divya Dutta	Zainab
Gurkirtan	Boota's uncle
Raghuvir Yadav	Ramzani (mentally challenged)
Arun Bakshi	Narrator at Boota's tomb
B.N. Sharma	Zainab's father
Amar Noorie	Santo (guest appearance)
Chetana Das	Boota's mother
Amrik Singh	
Darshan Aulakh	
Hari Om Jalota	Judge in Pakistan
Amolak Singh	

== Release ==
The movie was released on January 1, 1999.

=== Home Media Release ===
The film can be streamed online on the Chaupal OTT platform.

== Music ==
The music director is Amar Haldipur and the playback singers are Gurdas Maan, Asha Bhosle, Anuradha Paudwal, Nusrat Fateh Ali Khan and Karaamat Ali Khan, with Amar Noorie as a guest singer. The movie has six original tracks:

1. "Ishq Ni Darrda Maut Kolon," sung by Karaamat Ali Khan
2. "Eh Kaisi Rutt Aayi" sung by Gurdas Maan
3. "Meri Chunni Da Chamke," sung by Asha Bhosle, Anuradha Paudwal and Gurdas Maan
4. "Gaddiye Ni Der Na Karin," sung by Gurdas Maan
5. "Main Rowan Tarle Paawan," sung by Asha Bhosle and Gurdas Maan
6. "Aseen Tere Shehar Nu," sung by Gurdas Maan
7. "Ishq Da Rutba" sung by Nusrat Fateh Ali Khan
