= Amar Haldipur =

- Genres: Folk, Pop, Bhangra
- Occupations: Music director, Composer, Violinist
- Instrument: Violin

Amar Haldipur is a noted music director or composer of Indian music industry. He composed music for number of Bollywood as well as Punjabi movies including Shaheed-E-Mohabbat and Channa Sachi Muchi. His sons Siddharth Haldipur and Sangeet Haldipur are also doing well in music.

A Violinist, Music Arranger, music director. Arranged & wrote music for Lata Mangeshkar with the English Wren Orchestra, at Albert Hall in London. He has worked with Bollywood actor Amitabh Bachchan on films like SHEHANSHAH and MAIN AZAAD HOON. Arranged music for Asha Bhosle & Ghulam Ali's Album titled Meeraj - E - Gazal. All his albums of Pankaj Udhas made Gazal popular in India. Worked as music Arranger for Laxmikant Pyarelal, Khayyam, Rajesh Roshan, Shanker Jaikishan, Usha Khanna, Anu Malik, Nadeem Shravan, Madan Mohan, Hridaynath Mageskar, Nusaratfateh Ali Khan. Have arranged about 6000 songs. Played Violin Solos, performed all over the world, with Lata Mangeshkar, Pankaj Udhas, Kishore Kumar in their Concerts. His Violin solo on Mohd. Rafi's song DARD-E-DIL from film KARZ is a master piece. Composed & Arranged Background Scores for nearly 150 films. Also owned of a Recording studio in partnership with Gazal Singer Late Jagjit Singh. Composed a symphony music in Indian Ragas in collaboration with Pandit Hariprasad Chaurasia with English orchestra in England titled Krishna. Produced Marathi and Bengali films. The Bengali Film Ai Toh Jibon, starring Victor Bannerjee, Moushmi chatterjee, Moon moon Sen, Shoumitra Chatterjee is a great piece of work. Acted in Baba Saheb Ambedkar film in English & Hindi. Distributed Bhojpuri film's.
