= Film laboratory =

Facility for film post-production services

A film laboratory is a commercial service enterprise and technical facility for the film industry where specialists develop, print, and conform film material for classical film production and distribution which is based on film material, such as negative and positive, black and white and color, on different film formats: 65-70mm, 35mm, 28mm, 16mm, 9.5mm, 8mm. The film laboratory managers can charge by the footage or by time used while in lab.

== History ==
In the early days of motion pictures, films were processed by winding on flat racks and then dipping in tanks of solution. As films became longer, such methods proved to be too cumbersome.

== Processes ==
Exposed motion picture film will be processed according to exact chemical prescriptions at measured temperature as well as over measured time. After processing there is an original, the camera or picture original, in most cases a negative. From it a first sample is exposed on a motion-picture film printer. Again after processing there is a positive ready for inspection by the production representatives, usually by projection in the dark just like one sees a movie in a theatre.

The film lab thus needs various apparatus from developing equipment and machines, over measuring tools, cutting, editing devices, and printers to different sorts of viewing machinery including classic projectors. Besides there are sensitometers, densitometers, analysers, and array of chemical laboratory items that will help maintaining a level of repeatability of operations. Auxiliary material is also encountered within a film laboratory, for example leader film, plain plastic, to keep a developing machine threaded up.

== Other Resources ==
- FIAF List of Photochemical Film Labs From Around the World
