= Manoj Punj =

Indian Punjabi film director

- Born: 15 June 1970
- Died: 22 October 2006 (aged 36); Mumbai, Maharashtra, India
- Occupations: Film director, Screenwriter
- Known for: Shaheed-E-Mohabbat

Manoj Punj was an Indian Punjabi film director. He directed the hits in Punjabi Cinema. After graduating with a degree in arts, and experiencing theater in Chandigarh, he assisted Prof. P. S. Nirola who made corporate and documentary films. He then shifted to Mumbai where he began his career as an assistant in various television and film projects. Few years later he started directing various kinds of TV programmes independently. This was followed by a series of hit Punjabi films. Manoj Punj died on 22 October 2006 due to a cardiac arrest in Mumbai, Maharashtra state of India at a age of 36.

== Filmography ==
- Waris Shah: Ishq Daa Waaris (2006)
- Des Hoya Pardes (2004)
- Zindagi Khoobsoorat Hai (2002)
- Shaheed-E-Mohabbat (1999)

=== Writer ===
- Sukhmani – Hope for Life (2010)

== See also ==
- Gurdas Maan
- Shaheed-E-Mohabbat
