= Gurdas Maan =

Indian actor, singer and writer (born 1957)

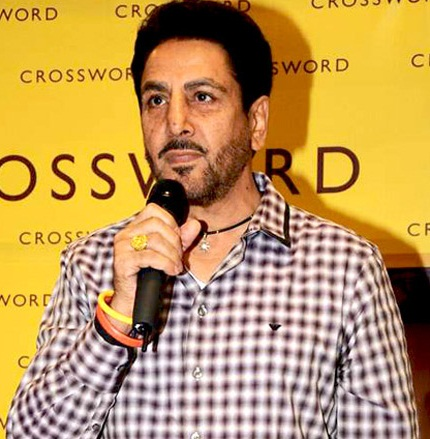
- Maan in 2012

Background information
- Born: 4 January 1957 (age 69); Giddarbaha, Punjab, India
- Genres: Folk; Bhangra
- Occupations: Singer-songwriter; actor; musician
- Years active: 1979–present
- Spouse: Manjeet Maan

Gurdas Maan (born 4 January 1957) is an Indian singer, songwriter and actor mainly associated with Punjabi language music and films. He gained national attention in 1980 with the song "Dil Da Mamla Hai". Since then, he had gone on to record over 34 albums and had written over 305 songs. In 2015 he performed on the song "Ki Banu Dunia Da" with Diljit Dosanjh in MTV Coke Studio India that was aired in season 4 episode 5 (16 August 2015) on MTV India. He is widely regarded as one of the greatest and the most influential Punjabi musicians of all time.

== Early life ==
Maan was born to Gurdev Singh and Tej Kaur in Giddarbaha, Punjab and is a native of the town. He did his initial schooling from Giddarbaha and completed his graduation from DAV college, Malout. He was interested in music and mimicry since childhood.

== Career ==
Maan initially worked in the electricity board, a job he was offered by officials he met at a singing event. In 1980, a producer approached him to perform the song "Dil Da Mamla Hai" in DD National.

Maan shot to fame with "Dil Da Mamla Hai." Soon after that came "Mamla Gadbad Hai" and "Chhalla", the latter being the hit film song from the Punjabi film Long Da Lishkara (1983), which Maan recorded under the music direction of legendary Jagjit Singh. During the late 1980s and 1990s, Maan became one of the leading figures in the growing Punjabi music scene. The increased demand for Punjabi pop among audiences in Punjab and the Punjabi diaspora helped create a new generation of Punjabi singing stars, with The Caravan identifying Maan as the best-known of these artists. He released more than ten albums during the 1990s, drawing on folk music and helping pave the way for the subsequent bhangra boom.

He sang a new rendition of his popular track, "Ki Banu Duniya Da" on Coke Studio with singer Diljit Dosanjh. The song was released on 15 August 2015 and hit more than 32 million views on YouTube in one week. He further reunited with Dosanjh to sing a new rendition of another one of his tracks, "Challa" in 2023.

=== Awards and honours ===
Maan is the only Punjabi singer to win the National Award for Best Male Playback Singer at the 54th National Film Awards for building the entire narrative through his singing of Heer in Waris Shah: Ishq Daa Waaris. The said film also entered the race for consideration in the 79th Academy Awards. The entry was made by India Waves TV, San Francisco, California on behalf of USA distributors of the film Golden Palm Entertainment Inc.

On other fronts, Maan has starred in blockbuster Bollywood films and has received numerous awards, including the Jury's Award, presented to him by the president of India in 2005.

In 2009, he won "Best International Album" at the UK Asian Music Awards for "Boot Polishan".

In 2017, he won the Filmfare Award for Living Legend in the first Filmfare Awards Punjabi event.

=== Film ===
Aside from singing in Punjabi, he is fluent in Hindi, Bengali, Tamil, Haryanvi and Rajasthani. As an actor, he has performed in Punjabi, Hindi and Tamil movies, making his film debut in Mamla Garbar Hai (1983), which became a commercial success and contributed to renewed interest in Punjabi cinema, but he is best known for his starring role in Waris Shah: Ishq Daa Waaris, a depiction of the Punjabi poet Waris Shah during the creation of his epic poem Heer Ranjha, again co-starring Juhi Chawla and Divya Dutta. He made a special appearance in Veer-Zaara with Shah Rukh Khan and Preity Zinta.

== Personal life ==
He is married to Manjeet Maan. They have a son, Gurickk Maan, who is married to actress Simran Kaur Mundi.

At a village near Karnal, Haryana, India on 20 January 2007 Maan was involved in a car accident in which his Range Rover was hit and severely damaged by a truck. Maan escaped with minor injuries on his face, hands, and chest. His driver Ganesh was injured seriously but recovered soon after.

This was the second car accident of two that Gurdas Maan was involved in. The first accident was a head-on collision between Maan's vehicle and a truck on 9 January 2001 at a village near Rupnagar, Punjab. In this accident Maan's driver Tejpal died. Maan later admitted that his driver asked him to wear his seat belt minutes before the accident. Maan believes that if it had not been for his driver's advice, he would have been dead as well. Later he wrote and performed a song "Baithi sade naal savari utter gayi" dedicated to his driver, who was also his good friend.

In a newspaper interview Maan revealed to the Express & Star, that he is an avid supporter of Manchester United football club.

His mother, Tej Kaur, died in 2016.

== Discography ==
Albums

Year	Title	Record label
1981	Dil Da Mamla Hai	His Master's Voice
1983	Masti	HMV
1984	Chakkar	
1988	Raat Suhani	T-Series
1988	Wah Ni Jawaniye	T-Series
1989	Nacho Babbeo	T-Series
1992	Tu Daati Asi Mangte Tere	Catrack Entertainment Private Limited
1992	Ibbadat Gurdas Maan	Saregama
1993	Teri Khair Hove	Roma ll Limited / Empire Music Limited
1993	Kirpa Daati Di	Catrack Entertainment Private Limited
1994	Vekhin Kite Yaar Na Hove	Catrack Entertainment Private Limited
1995	Chugliyaan	T-Series
1997	Yaar Mera Pyar	T-Series
1997	Peerh Prahoni	T-Series
1998	Bhanven Kakh Na Rahe	T-Series
1998	Dil Hona Chahida Jawaan	Venus
1999	Five Rivers	Moviebox Birmingham, Ltd.
1999	Jaadugarian	Venus
2001	Larh Geya Pecha	SAGA MUSIC
2001	Aaja Sajna	Hi-Tech Music Ltd
1994	Ishq Da Gidda	TIPS Music
2003	Haee Shawa Baee Haee Shawa	T-Series
2003	Punjeeri	T-Series
2004	Heer	T-Series
2004	Dil Da Badshah	Saregama
2005	Vilayatan	MOVIEBOX BIRMINGHAM LTD
1995	Ishq Na Dekhe Zaat	TIPS Music
2008	Boot Polishan	Sony BMG Music Entertainment
2011	Jogiya	T-Series
2011	Sada Punjab - Duniya Mela Do Din Da	Saregama
2013	Roti	Speed Records
2013	Punjab Di Shaan	Saregama
2014	The Pop Sensation - Gurdas Maan	Saregama
2015	Pyar Kar Le	TIPS Music
2017	Punjab	SAGA MUSIC
2023	Tu Nimaniya Da Mann	Sai Productions
2023	Chinta Na Kar Yaar	Sai Productions
2023	Gal Sunoh Punjabi Dosto	Sai Productions
2024	Sound Of Soil	Speed Records & Times Music

=== Duo collaboration ===
Year	Song	Record label	Music	Album
2006	"Collaboration"	MovieBox/Planet Recordz/Speed Records	Sukshinder Shinda	Collaborations
2009	"Jaag Dhe Reehnah"	VIP Records/Saregama	Tru-Skool & Kaos Productions	In Tha House
2015	"Apna Punjab Hove"	VIP Records/Saregama	Tru-Skool & Kaos Productions	In Tha House 2
2015	"Ki Banu Duniya Da"	Coke Studio India	ft. Diljit Dosanjh	
2016	"Jaag De Rehnah"	Moviebox	ft. Tru Skool	
2019	"Maan Punjabi Hon Te"	Zee studio		Single track
2024	"Bulaava Aaya"	Salim Sulaiman Music		Single track

== Filmography ==
=== Film ===
Year	Movie	Role	Language
1982	Ucha Dar Babe Nanak Da	Gurdit	Punjabi
1983	Long Da Lishkara	Channa	Punjabi
1984	Mamla Gadbad Hai	Amarjeet	Punjabi
1986	Ki Banu Duniya Da	Gurwant/Gurmaan (double role)	Punjabi
1986	Gabhroo Punjab Da	Shera	Punjabi
1990	Qurbani Jatt Di	Karamjeet	Punjabi
1991	Roohani Taaqat	Shankar	Hindi
1992	Saali Adhi Ghar Waali		Punjabi
1994	Wanted: Gurdas Maan Dead or Alive	Gurdas Maan	Punjabi
1994	Kachehari	Gurdas/Ajit (double role)	Punjabi
1995	Pratigya	Billa	Punjabi
1995	Bagawat	Gurjeet	Punjabi
1995	Maaman Magal	Guest appearance	Tamil
1999	Shaheed-E-Mohabbat	Boota Singh	Punjabi
1999	Sirf Tum	Himself	Hindi
2000	Shaheed Udham Singh	Bhagat Singh	Punjabi
2002	Zindagi Khoobsurat Hai	Amar	Hindi
2004	Des Hoyaa Pardes	Gurshaan Singh Somal	Punjabi
2004	Veer Zaara	Guest appearance	Hindi
2006	Waris Shah: Ishq Daa Waaris	Waris Shah	Punjabi
2008	Yaariyan	Jasnaavar Singh Jassa	Punjabi
2009	Mini Punjab	Prem	Punjabi
2010	Sukhmani: Hope for Life	Major Kuldeep Singh	Punjabi
2010	Chak Jawana	Captain Gurjeet Singh	Punjabi
2011	Mummy Punjabi	Guest appearance	Hindi
2014	Dil Vil Pyaar Vyaar	Agam	Punjabi
2016	Needhi Singh	Guest appearance	Punjabi
2018	Nankana	Karam Singh 'Karma'	Punjabi
2018	Manto	Sirajuddin	Urdu

=== Television ===
Year	Show	Role
2020	Sa Re Ga Ma Pa Punjabi	Judge
