= Manjeet Maan =

Indian film producer and director

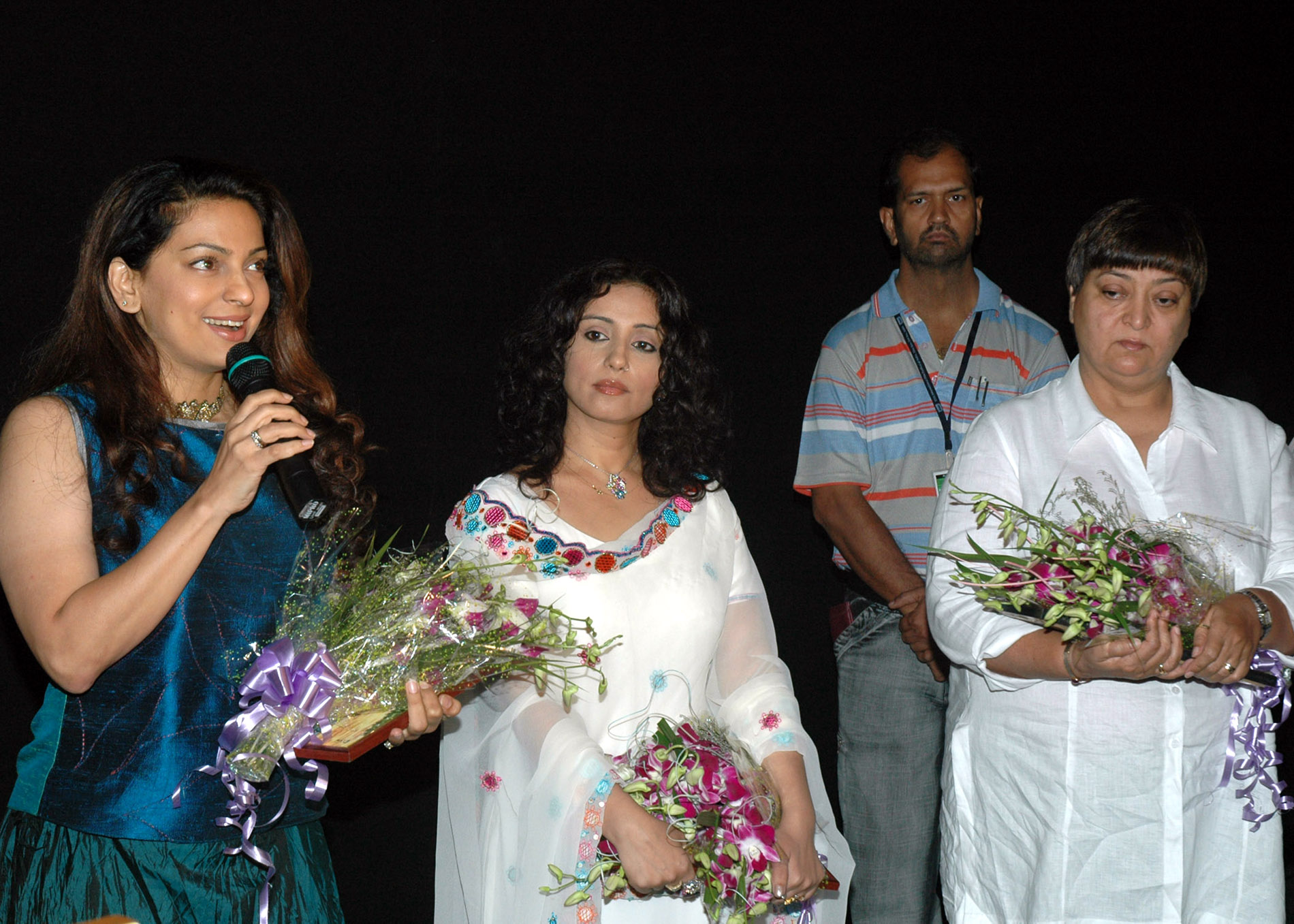
- Manjeet Maan (right), IFFI (2006)
- Occupations: Actress, film producer, director
- Spouse: Gurdas Maan

Manjeet Maan (also spelled as Manjit Maan) is an Indian film producer and director who works in Punjabi language films. She is married to the noted singer-songwriter and actor Gurdas Maan, and is the owner of Sai Productions, a film production company based in Mumbai. She also acted in the film Gabhroo Punjab Da, opposite Maan. She made her directorial debut with Sukhmani: Hope for Life in 2010.

== Filmography ==
| Year | Film | Role | Co-stars | Notes |
|---|---|---|---|---|
| 1983 | Laung Da Lishkara | Taaro | | |
| 1986 | Gabhroo Punjab Da | Reshma | | |
| 1986 | Kee Banu Duniya Da | Pali | | |
