= Juhi Chawla filmography =

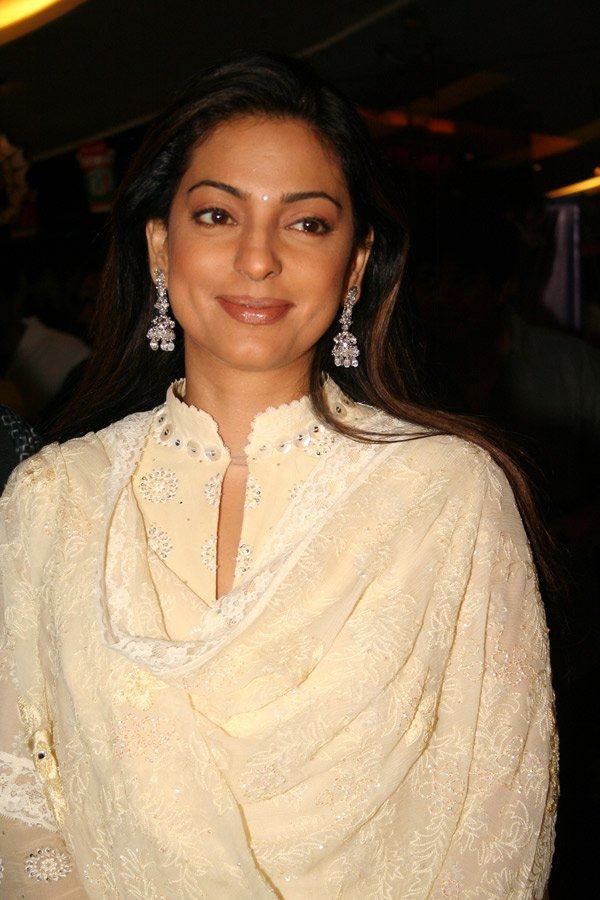
Chawla in 2013

Juhi Chawla is an Indian actress and film producer who has worked predominantly in Hindi cinema, in addition to Kannada and Punjabi films. After winning the Miss India 1984 pageant, she made her acting debut in the Hindi film Sultanat (1986). Her first commercial success came with the Kannada film Premaloka (1987), while her breakthrough in Hindi cinema came with Qayamat Se Qayamat Tak (1988), for which she won the Filmfare Award for Lux New Face of the Year and received a nomination for the Filmfare Award for Best Actress.

Chawla established herself as a leading actress in Hindi cinema during the late 1980s and early 1990s, appearing in commercially successful films including Pratibandh (1990), Swarg (1990), Bol Radha Bol (1992), and Raju Ban Gaya Gentleman (1992). She won the Filmfare Award for Best Actress for her performance in Hum Hain Rahi Pyar Ke (1993), and further received acclaim for her roles in Aaina (1993) and Darr (1993). Her other successful films during the decade included Ram Jaane (1995), Loafer (1996), Deewana Mastana (1997), Yes Boss (1997), Ishq (1997), Mr and Mrs Khiladi (1997), and Duplicate (1998).

During the 2000s, Chawla shifted toward independent and critically acclaimed productions, starring in features such as Jhankaar Beats (2003), 3 Deewarein (2003), My Brother Nikhil (2005), 7½ Phere (2005), Bas Ek Pal (2006), and Swami (2007). Her performances in 3 Deewarein and My Brother Nikhil were particularly well received by critics. She also appeared in mainstream productions, such as Bhoothnath (2008). She subsequently continued to work in Hindi and regional cinema, alongside occasional appearances in television and other screen productions.

In addition to acting, Chawla has worked as a film producer. In 1999, Chawla co-founded the production company Dreamz Unlimited with Shah Rukh Khan and Aziz Mirza. The company produced Phir Bhi Dil Hai Hindustani (2000), Aśoka (2001), and Chalte Chalte (2003), with the latter becoming a commercial success. Chawla has also appeared in television and streaming productions, including Jhalak Dikhhla Jaa (2009), The Test Case (2017), Hush Hush (2022), and The Railway Men (2023).

== Films ==
List of Juhi Chawla film credits
Year	Title	Role(s)	Language	Notes	Ref.
1986	Sultanat	Zarina	Hindi		
1987	Premaloka	Shashikala	Kannada		
1987	Paruva Ragam	Shashikala	Tamil		
1988	Qayamat Se Qayamat Tak	Rashmi	Hindi	Filmfare Award for Lux New Face of the Year Nominated—Filmfare Award for Best Actress	
1988	Kaliyuga Karnudu	Jaya	Telugu		
1988	Ranadheera	Herself	Kannada		
1989	Amar Prem	Deepika	Bengali		
1989	Chandni	Devika	Hindi	Special appearance	
1989	Kindari Jogi	Ganga	Kannada		
1989	Vicky Daada	Sravani	Telugu		
1989	Love Love Love	Reema Goswami	Hindi		
1989	Goonj	Sangeeta	Hindi		
1990	Swarg	Jyoti	Hindi		
1990	Pratibandh	Shanti	Hindi	Nominated—Filmfare Award for Best Actress	
1990	Tum Mere Ho	Paro	Hindi		
1990	Zahreelay	Chamki	Hindi		
1990	Shandaar	Tulsi	Hindi		
1990	C.I.D.	Raksha Sharma	Hindi		
1991	Benaam Badsha	Jyothi	Hindi		
1991	Mehandi Ban Gai Khoon	Jyothi	Hindi		
1991	Karz Chukana Hai	Radha	Hindi		
1991	Bhabhi	Asha	Hindi		
1991	Shanti Kranti	Jyothi	Multi	The film was shot simultaneously in four languages with Tamil title Nattukku Oru Nallavan	
1992	Apan Por	Swapna	Bengali		
1992	Bol Radha Bol	Radha	Hindi	Nominated—Filmfare Award for Best Actress	
1992	Radha Ka Sangam	Radha	Hindi		
1992	Raju Ban Gaya Gentleman	Renu	Hindi		
1992	Mere Sajana Saath Nibhana	Janki	Hindi		
1992	Bewaffa Se Waffa	Rukhsar	Hindi		
1992	Daulat Ki Jung	Asha Agrawal	Hindi		
1992	Rishta Ho To Aisa	Seema	Hindi		
1993	Lootere	Anjali	Hindi		
1993	Shatranj	Radha	Hindi		
1993	Izzat Ki Roti	Jyoti Prasad	Hindi		
1993	Tadipaar	Rajkumari	Hindi		
1993	Aaina	Reema Mathur	Hindi		
1993	Hum Hain Rahi Pyaar Ke	Vyjayanti Iyer	Hindi	Won: Filmfare Award for Best Actress	
1993	Darr	Kiran Awasti	Hindi	Nominated—Filmfare Award for Best Actress	
1993	Bhagyawan	Geeta	Hindi		
1993	Pehla Nasha	Herself	Hindi	Cameo	
1994	Eena Meena Deeka	Meena	Hindi		
1994	Gentleman	Roshni	Hindi		
1994	Andaz	Saraswati	Hindi		
1994	Ghar Ki Izzat	Geeta	Hindi		
1994	Paramaatma	Rajani	Hindi		
1994	Saajan Ka Ghar	Laxmi Khanna	Hindi		
1994	Andaz Apna Apna	Herself	Hindi	Cameo	
1994	Kabhi Haan Kabhi Na	Herself	Hindi	Cameo	
1995	Ram Jaane	Bela	Hindi		
1995	Kartavya	Kajal Sahay	Hindi		
1995	Naajayaz	Inspector Sandhya	Hindi		
1995	Aatank Hi Aatank	Sapna	Hindi		
1996	Talaashi	Megha	Hindi		
1996	Loafer	Kiran Mathur	Hindi		
1996	Bandish	Sharmila	Hindi		
1996	Daraar	Priya Bhatia	Hindi	Nominated—Filmfare Award for Best Actress	
1997	Yes Boss	Seema Kapoor	Hindi	Nominated—Filmfare Award for Best Actress	
1997	Ishq	Madhu	Hindi		
1997	Mr. and Mrs. Khiladi	Shalu	Hindi		
1997	Deewana Mastana	Dr Neha Sharma	Hindi		
1998	Saat Rang Ke Sapne	Jalima	Hindi		
1998	Harikrishnans	Mira Varma	Malayalam		
1998	Duplicate	Sonia Kapoor	Hindi		
1998	Jhooth Bole Kauwa Kaate	Jaya Salgaonkarr	Hindi		
1999	Safari	Anjali Agarwal	Hindi		
1999	Arjun Pandit	Nisha Singh	Hindi		
1999	Shaheed Udham Singh	Noor Jehan	Hindi		
2000	Gang	Sanam	Hindi		
2000	Karobaar: The Business of Love	Seema Saxena	Hindi		
2000	Phir Bhi Dil Hai Hindustani	Ria Banerjee	Hindi		
2001	One 2 Ka 4	Gita Chaudhry	Hindi		
2001	Ek Rishtaa	Priti Kapoor	Hindi		
2001	Aamdani Atthani Kharcha Rupaiyaa	Jhoomri	Hindi		
2002	3 Deewarein	Chandreika	Hindi		
2003	Jhankaar Beats	Shanti	Hindi		
2004	Des Hoya Pardes	Jassi	Punjabi		
2005	My Brother Nikhil	Avantika	Hindi		
2005	Paheli	Gajrobai	Hindi		
2005	Khamoshh... Khauff Ki Raat	Dr Sakshi Saagar	Hindi	Cameo	
2005	Home Delivery: Aapko... Ghar Tak	Parvati Kakkar	Hindi	Cameo	
2005	7½ Phere	Asmi Ganatra	Hindi		
2005	Dosti: Friends Forever	Dr Aditi Mathur	Hindi	Special appearance	
2006	Bas Ek Pal	Ira Malhotra	Hindi		
2006	Waris Shah: Ishq Daa Waaris	Bhaagbhari	Punjabi		
2007	Salaam-e-Ishq: A Tribute To Love	Seema	Hindi		
2007	Swami	Radha	Hindi		
2007	Om Shanti Om	Herself	Hindi	Special appearance in the song "Deewangi Deewangi"	
2008	Bhootnath	Anjali Chopra	Hindi		
2008	Krazzy 4	Dr Sonali	Hindi		
2008	Kismat Konnection	Haseena Bano Jaan	Hindi		
2009	Luck By Chance	Minty Rolly	Hindi		
2009	Kal Kissne Dekha	Herself	Hindi	Cameo	
2010	Sukhmani – Hope for Life	Kuldeep Singh's wife	Punjabi		
2010	Ramayana: The Epic	Sita (voice)	Hindi		
2010	Lafangey Parindey	Judge	Hindi	Special appearance	
2011	I Am	Megha	Hindi	Nominated—Filmfare Award for Best Supporting Actress	
2012	Krishna Aur Kans	Yashoda (voice)	Hindi		
2012	Main Krishna Hoon	Kantaben	Hindi		
2012	Son of Sardaar	Parmeet Kaur	Hindi		
2013	Bombay Talkies	Herself	Hindi	Special appearance in the song "Apna Bombay Talkies"	
2013	Hum Hai Raahi Car Ke	Dr Vaijayanti Iyer	Hindi	Cameo	
2014	Gulaab Gang	Sumitra Devi Bagrecha	Hindi	Nominated—Filmfare Award for Best Supporting Actress	
2014	Dil Vil Pyar Vyar	Herself	Punjabi	Cameo	
2014	The Hundred-Foot Journey	Ammi Mama Kadam	Hindi	Cameo	
2016	Chalk n Duster	Jyoti	Hindi		
2017	Pushpaka Vimana	Herself	Kannada	Cameo	
2018	Ventilator	Doctor	Gujarati	Cameo	
2018	Zero	Herself	Hindi	Cameo	
2019	Ek Ladki Ko Dekha Toh Aisa Laga	Chatro	Hindi		
2019	Very Good 10/10	Herself	Kannada	Cameo	
2022	Sharmaji Namkeen	Veena Manchanda	Hindi		
2023	Friday Night Plan	Mrs. Menon	Hindi		

== Producer ==
List of Juhi Chawla co-produced credits
Year	Film	Co-producer	Ref.
2000	Phir Bhi Dil Hai Hindustani	Shah Rukh Khan	
2001	Aśoka	Gauri Khan	
2003	Chalte Chalte	Shah Rukh Khan and Aziz Mirza	

== Television ==
List of Juhi Chawla television credits
Year	Title	Role	Notes	Ref.
1986	Bahadur Shah Zafar	Nur Jahan		
1995	Mahashakti	Kanchan		
2009	Jhalak Dikhhla Jaa	Judge	Season 3	
2011	Badmaash Company- Ek Shararat Hone Ko Hai	Host		
2017	The Test Case	Shraddha Pandit	Cameo	
2022	Hush Hush	Isha 'Ishi' Sangamitra		
2023	The Railway Men	Rajeshwari Janglay		

== See also ==
- List of awards and nominations received by Juhi Chawla
