= Indian Film Festival of Melbourne =

Film festival

- Location: Melbourne
- Founded: 2010
- Most recent: 2025
- Awards: IFFM Awards, Telstra People's Choice Award
- Film titles: Indian feature films, independent films, documentaries, short films
- Directors: Mitu Bhowmick Lange
- Hosted by: Mind Blowing Films; VicScreen
- Festival date: Annually
- Website: www.iffm.com.au

The Indian Film Festival of Melbourne (IFFM) is an annual festival based in Melbourne founded in 2010. It was previously funded by Victoria State Government. It is presented by Film Victoria, and the provider is chosen through a tender process. The current tender provider is Mind Blowing Films, run by Mitu Bhowmick Lange who is the Festival Director of IFFM. The festival has currently been provided with State Government funding until 2018. The goal of the film festival is to showcase Indian cinema to the Australian audience. The festival has streamed Bollywood films, Indie movies, documentaries, regional cinema from India etc. It also organizes short film competitions, dance competitions and a flag hoisting ceremony since it is during the time of Indian Independence day celebrations in Melbourne.

== History ==
It was founded in 2010. The State Government of Victoria started funding the festival since 2012. It was result of the Liberal Party of Australia (Victorian Division)’s policy "to strengthen Victoria's ties with the Indian film industries". The policy was first released in October 2006, was funded in November 2010, and implemented in March 2012 through a tender process.

Mind Blowing Films, owned by Mitu Bhowmick Lange, won the tender in March 2012 for three years until 2014, and was given one year extensions by the Liberal National Coalition Government for 2015 and 2016. In May 2012, The Sydney Morning Herald reported that the company behind the Festival was recycling films already released, and so appeared to be using government money to rebadge a festival it had already been running as a commercial enterprise. In August 2017, South Indian film actress/producer Khushbu accused the Indian Film Festival of Melbourne of discriminating against non-Hindi films and film stars. Mitu Bhowmick Lange responded with "I am very surprised to be honest because we have 60 films in 20 languages. The film festival has always always been about diversity," stating that some of the South Indian actors invited had not been able to attend due to busy schedules.

Mind Blowing Films was again awarded the contract for 2017 and 2018 by the new State Government in November 2016.

The festival also facilitated the film project My Melbourne, in which Indian filmmakers collaborated with Victorian filmmakers to produce short films addressing themes such as race, disability, sexuality, and gender.

In November 2025, the Indian Film Festival of Melbourne led an Australian screen industry delegation to the 56th International Film Festival of India (IFFI) in Goa. During the festival, IFFM entered into a three-year Memorandum of understanding with IFFI and the National Film Development Corporation of India to expand festival cooperation, industry exchange, and screen collaboration between Australia and India.

== Telstra People's Choice Award ==
This award is given at the Festival for Outstanding Achievement of an Indian film in terms of box office revenue and critical appreciation for an Indian film released in that year. The award was instituted in 2014.

=== Recipients ===
Year (Note: Refers to the year in which the ceremony was held.)	Film	Director	Producer	Ref.
2014	Dhoom 3	Vijay Krishna Acharya	Aditya Chopra	
2015	PK	Rajkumar Hirani	Vidhu Vinod Chopra	
2016	Kapoor & Sons	Shakun Batra	Karan Johar	
2017	Baahubali 2: The Conclusion	S. S. Rajamouli	Shobu Yarlagadda	
2017	Dangal	Nitesh Tiwari	Aamir Khan	
2019	Simmba	Rohit Shetty		

== 2010 ==
The first edition of the festival was held in 2010 and featured the work of actress Rani Mukerji such as Bunty Aur Babli, Black, Hum Tum, Kabhi Alvida Naa Kehna, Paheli, and Saathiya. The festival showcased several other Hindi films such as 3 Idiots, Dev.D, Dil Bole Hadippa, Dostana, Ghajini, Kaminey, Love Aaj Kal, Luck by Chance, New York, Paa, Rab Ne Bana Di Jodi, and Wake Up Sid.

== 2011 ==
The 2011 edition of the festival featured over 30 films, including 15 Australian premieres. Notable attendees included actors Vidya Balan, Malaika Arora, Ali Zafar, Juhi Chawla, and directors Kabir Khan, Raj Kumar Gupta, Leslee Udwin, Onir, and Arbaaz Khan. In 2011, the festival set a new Guinness World Record for the 'Largest Bollywood Dance' with 1500 participants.

== 2012 ==
In 2012, the IFFM curated and showed 40 films modern Indian cinema, Bengali films and popular Indian films.

== 2013 ==
IFFM in 2013 consisted of Bollywood dance competition. The festival went on for 20 days on 5 screens in Melbourne and opened with India's first silent film ‘Raja Harish Chandra’ accompanied by a live band playing the background score along with the colored ‘Mughal-E-Azam’. Some of the more contemporary films included Bombay Talkies, Sholay and Talaash. Some of the guests included Pamela Chopra, Vidya Balan Prabhudeva, Farah Khan, Simi Garewal, Kabir Khan, Onir; and Avtar Panesar.

== 2014 ==
IFFM International Screen Icon Award : Amitabh Bachchan (attended in person)

Best Film : Bhaag Milkha Bhaag

Best Indie Film : The Lunchbox

Telstra's People's Choice Award : Dhoom 3

Best Actress : Kangna Ranaut for Queen

Best Actor : Farhan Akhtar for Bhaag Milkha Bhaag and Irfan Khan for The Lunchbox

Special Jury Commendation : Anand Gandhi for The Ship of Theseus

Wester Union Best Director : Rakeysh Omprakash Mehra

== 2015 ==
In 2015, IFFM was a two weeks festival and had a theme of equality. The festival also incorporated interactive master classes, Awards Night, short film competition and Bollywood dance competition. Indian Independence day celebrations were included in IFFM from this year onwards.

The festival was launched by Minister for Creative Industries Martin Foley with Anil Kapoor and Sonam Kapoor. The winners were awarded at National Gallery of Victoria.

Other guests included Rajkumar Hirani, Simi Garewal, Imran Khan, Shonali Bose, Nagesh Kukunoor and Elahé Hiptoola.

IIFM Award for Cinematic Excellence : Anil Kapoor,

Best Film: Piku Best Director:

Shoojit Sircar for Piku

Best Indie Film: Kaaka Muttai ( Crows Eggs)

Telstra's People Choice Award: PK

Western Union Short Film Award: Rape- It's Your Fault (India) and Road to Grand Final (Aus)

Best Actor : Irrfan Khan for Piku and Shahid Kapoor for Haider

Best Actress: Bhumi Padnekar for Dum Lagake Haisha

== 2016 ==
The IFFM in 2016 opened with film parched and closed with Angry Indian Goddesses. The festival also included panel discussions about women in cinema and had guests Sue Maslin, Leena Yadav and Richa Chadha, who gave a master class on Bollywood and body positivity

Westpac Excellence In Cinema Award: Rishi Kapoor

Telstra Best Film: Kapoor & Sons

Westpac Best Indie Film Award: Parched

Westpac Best Director Award: Leena Yadav

Best Actor: Nawazuddin Siddiqi for Raman Ragav 2.0

Best Actress: Sonam Kapoor for Neerja

Western Union Short Film Festival Best Film Award: Josh Walker for Out on a Lim.

== 2017 ==
The Westpac IFFM Excellence in Global Cinema Award: Aishwarya Rai Bachchan

Best Indie Film: Lipstick Under My Burkha

Best Director: Nitesh Tiwari for Dangal

Equality in Cinema Award: Director/Actor Rahul Bose for Poorna

Best Actress : Konkona Sen Sharma for Lipstick Under my Burkha

Best Actor : Sushant Singh Rajput for Dhoni

Best Actor (Special Mention) : Raj Kumar Rao for Trapped,

Best Film : Pin People's Choice Award : Dangal & Bahubali 2,

Leadership in cinema: Karan Johar

== 2019 ==
IFFM 2019 was organized at Palais Theatre. Guests included Shah Rukh Khan, Karan Johar, Zoya Akhtar, Tabu, Sriram Raghavan, Malaika Arora and Arjun Kapoor. IFFM in 2019 was hosted by Karan Tacker.

2019 Award:

Best Short Film - Be my Brother, My name is Mohamad and Ragdad, We don't exist here anymore

Best Actor - Vijay Sethupathi for Super Deluxe

Best Actress - Tabu for Andhadhun

Best Director - Sriram Raghavan for Andhadhun

Best Film - Gully Boy

Best Indie Film - Bulbul Can Sing

IFFM Diversity Award: Onir

Telstra People's Choice Award: Simmba

PWC Equality in Cinema award an honorary award: Chuksit and Super Deluxe

IFFM Excellence in Cinema: Shah Rukh Khan

== 2020 ==
The festival in 2020 was delayed from its usual time in August to October because the pandemic. It included approximately 50 films in 17 languages.

== 2021 ==
The 2021 IFFM had 127 films in 27 languages including films by 34 film directors.

Best Feature Film: Soorarai Pottru

Best Performance Male (Feature): Suriya Sivakumar (Soorarai Pottru)

Best Performance Female (Feature): Vidya Balan (Sherni) & Honourable mention to Nimisha Sajayan (The Great Indian Kitchen)

Best Director: Anurag Basu (Ludo) & Honorary Mention Prithvi Konanur (Pinki Elli?)

Best Series: Mirzapur Season 2

Best Actress in a Series: Samantha Ruth Prabhu (The Family Man 2)

Best Actor in a Series: Manoj Bajpayee (The Family Man 2)

Equality in Cinema (Short Film): Sheer Qorma

Equality in Cinema Award (Feature Film): The Great Indian Kitchen

Best Indie Film: Fire in the Mountains

Diversity in Cinema Award: Pankaj Tripathi

Disruptor Award: Sanal Kumar Sasidharan

Best Documentary Film: Shut Up Sona

== 2022 ==
The 2022 IFFM was held from 12 August to 30 August.

- Best Feature Film: 83 by Kabir Khan
- Best Performance Male (Feature): Ranveer Singh for 83
- Best Performance Female (Feature): Shefali Shah for Jalsa
- Best Director: Jointly won by Shoojit Sircar for Sardar Udham and Aparna Sen for The Rapist
- Best Series: Mumbai Diaries 26/11 by Nikkhil Advani
- Best Actress in a Series: Sakshi Tanwar for MAI
- Best Actor in a Series: Mohit Raina for Mumbai Diaries 26/11
- Equality in Cinema Award (Feature Film): The team of Jalsa directed by Suresh Triveni
- Best Indie Film: Jaggi by Anmol Sidhu (Punjabi)
- Best Film from the Subcontinent: Joyland
- Disruptor Award: Vaani Kapoor for Chandigarh Kare Aashiqui
- Best Documentary Film: A Night of Knowing Nothing by Payal Kapadia
- Lifetime Achievement Award - Kapil Dev
- Leadership in Cinema Award - Abhishek Bachchan
- Special screening of Ayena at Hoyts Melbourne Central followed by a Q & A session with Actor Ritu Saini, Faraha Khan and Director Nilanjan Bhattacharya on 15th Aug.
- Special screening of No Land's Man at Hoyts Melbourne Central followed by a Q & A session with Actor Megan Mitchell on 16th Aug
- Special screening of Jaggi at Hoyts Highpoint followed by a Q & A session with Director Anmol Sidhu, Actor Ramnish Chaudhary, Producer Dhruv Bakshi and co-producer & DOP Pradeep Kumar Mannan on 17th Aug
- Special screening of Shut Up Sona at Hoyts Highpoint followed by a Q & A session with Sona Mohapatra & World Premiere of Maali (Gardener) at Hoyts Melbourne Central followed by a Q & A session with the producer Pragya Kapoor, Sonali Rana and Director Shiv C. Shetty on 18th Aug
- Special screening of Joyland at Hoyts Melbourne Central followed by a Q & A session with director Sain Sadiq, Producer Apoorva Guru Charan, Actor Rasti Farooq, Alina Khan and Ali Junejo on 19th and World Premiere of Paraasakthi at Hoyts District Docklands followed by a Q&A session with Producer Apoorva Bakshi on 19th aug
- 20 August, IFFM Closing Night Film at Hoyts District Docklands, Melbourne: The Rapist followed by Q&A session with the director Aparna Sen on Zoom

== 2023 ==
The 2023 IFFM award ceremony was held on 11 August.

- Best Documentary - To Kill a Tiger
- Best Indie Film - Agra
- Best Performance in Film (Male) - Mohit Agarwal for Agra
- Best Performance in a film (Female) - Rani Mukerji for Mrs. Chatterjee vs Norway
- Best Director - Prithvi Konanur - Hadinelentu (Seventeeners)
- Best Film - Sita Ramam
- Best Performance (Male) in a Series - Prosenjit Chatterjee for Jubilee; Vijay Varma for Dahaad
- Best Performance (Female) in a series- Rajshri Deshpande for Trial By Fire
- Best Series - Jubilee
- Best Short Film - People's Choice - Connection Kya Hain by Nilesh Naik
- Best Short Film - Australia - Home by Mark Russel Bernard
- Honorary Awards
  - Equality in Cinema Award - Darlings
  - People's Choice Award - Pathaan
  - Award to Karan Johar for his 25 years as a filmmaker
  - Rising Global Superstar of Indian Cinema - Kartik Aaryan
  - Diversity in Cinema Award - Mrunal Thakur
  - Disruptor Award - Bhumi Pednekar
  - Rainbow Stories Award - Onir for Pine Cone

== 2024 ==
The 2024 IFFM award ceremony was held on 16 August.

- Best Film - 12th Fail
- Best Director - Kabir Khan for Chandu Champion and Nithilan Saminathan for Maharaja
- Best Actor - Kartik Aaryan for Chandu Champion
- Best Actress - Parvathy Thiruvothu for Ullozhukku
- Best Film (Critics' Choice) - Laapataa Ladies
- Best Director (Critics' Choice) - Dominic Sangma for Rimdogittanga (Rapture)
- Best Performance of the Year (Critics' Choice) - Vikrant Massey for 12th Fail
- Breakout Film of the Year - Amar Singh Chamkila
- Best Series - Kohrra
- Best Actor in a Series - Arjun Mathur for Made in Heaven Season 2
- Best Actress in a Series - Nimisha Sajayan for Poacher
- Best Documentary - Trolley Times
- Best Short Film - The Vegemite Sandwich
- Best Short Film (Special Mention) - Sandeep Raj for Echo
- Best Film from the Subcontinent - The Red Suitcase from Nepal
- Honorary Awards
  - People's Choice Award - Rocky Aur Rani Kii Prem Kahaani
  - Equality in Cinema Award - Dunki
  - Excellence in Cinema - A. R. Rahman
  - Ambassador of Indian Art & Culture - Ram Charan
  - Diversity Champion - Rasika Dugal
  - Disruptor in Cinema - Adarsh Gourav

== 2025 ==
The 16th edition of the Indian Film Festival of Melbourne was held in August 2025. The festival opened with the Australian premiere of Baksho Bondi. Awards were announced on 16 August 2025, with Neeraj Ghaywan's Homebound receiving the festival's top honours.

Winners

- Best Film: Homebound
- Best Director: Neeraj Ghaywan (Homebound)
- Best Indie Film: Angammal
- Best Actor (Male) – Film: Abhishek Bachchan (I Want to Talk)
- Special Mention – Best Actor (Male): Gugun Kipgen (Boong)
- Best Actor (Female) – Film: Geetha Kailasam (Angammal)
- Best Series: Black Warrant
- Best Actor (Male) – Series: Jaideep Ahlawat (Paatal Lok, Season 2)
- Best Actor (Female) – Series: Nimisha Sajayan (Dabba Cartel)
- Excellence in Cinema Award: Aamir Khan
- Leadership in Cinema Award: Arvind Swamy
- Disruptor Award: Vir Das
- Diversity in Cinema Award: Aditi Rao Hydari
- Equality in Cinema Award: Baksho Bondi
- Best Short Film (India): Kalar Pencils – Dhananjay Santosh Goregaonkar
- Best Short Film (Australia): Drifters – David Liu

== 2026 ==
The 17th edition of the Indian Film Festival of Melbourne was held from 13 to 23 August 2026. The IFFM Awards ceremony was held on 13 August at the Palais Theatre in Melbourne.

Winners

- Best Film: Lokah Chapter 1: Chandra
- Best Film – Special Mention: The Great Shamsuddin Family
- Best Indie Film: Not a Hero – Rima Das
- Special Mention – Indie Film: Kikkran De Phull (Flowers of Acacia)
- Best Director: Rishab Shetty – Kantara: A Legend – Chapter 1
- Best Actor: Dulquer Salmaan – Kaantha
- Best Actress: Kirti Kulhari – Full Plate
- Best Film from the Subcontinent: No Good Men – Shahrbanoo Sadat
- Best Documentary Film: Flying Tigers – Madhusree Dutta
- People's Choice Award: Saiyaara
- Equality in Cinema Award, presented by La Trobe: Sitaare Zameen Par
- Special Mention – Equality in Cinema: Simran Mangeshkar – Sitaare Zameen Par
- Rainbow Storyteller Award: Lala and Poppy
- Short Film Competition (Australia): The Weight of Soil
- Short Film Competition (India): Jo's Turn
- Best Actor (Series): Vijay Varma – Matka King
- Best Actress (Series): Rasika Dugal – Delhi Crime season 3
- Best Series: Freedom at Midnight, season 2
- Artist of Distinction: Pankaj Tripathi
- Special Recognition: Rani Mukerji
- Leadership in Cinema: Rishab Shetty
- Excellence in Cinema: Rekha
