= List of awards and nominations received by Juhi Chawla =

This is a list of awards and nominations of Juhi Chawla, an Indian actress.

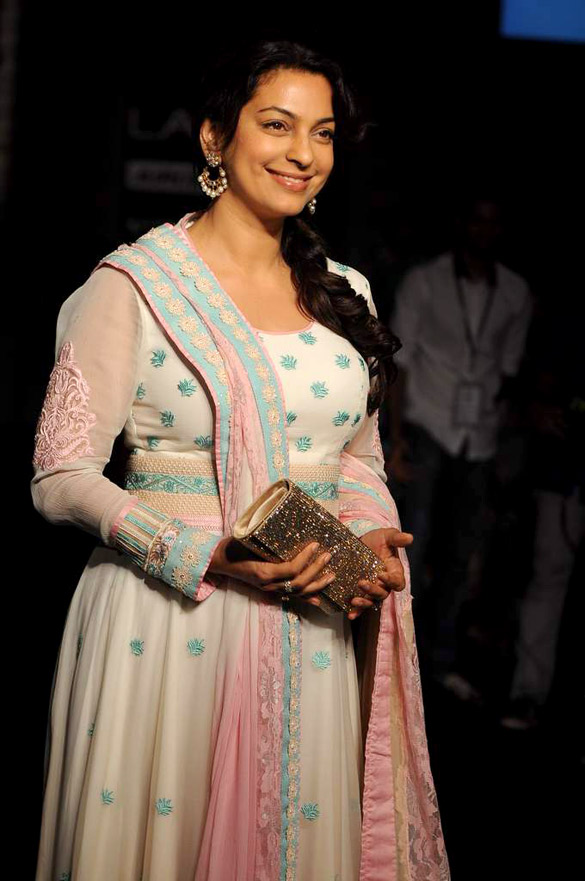
Chawla in 2012

== Filmfare Awards ==
Year	Category	Film	Result
1989	Best Female Debut	Qayamat Se Qayamat Tak	Won
1989	Best Actress	Qayamat Se Qayamat Tak	Nominated
1991	Best Actress	Pratibandh	Nominated
1993	Best Actress	Bol Radha Bol	Nominated
1994	Best Actress	Hum Hain Rahi Pyar Ke	Won
1997	Best Actress	Daraar	Nominated
1998	Best Actress	Yes Boss	Nominated
2002	Best Film	Asoka	Nominated
2012	Best Supporting Actress	I Am	Nominated
2015	Best Supporting Actress	Gulaab Gang	Nominated

== IIFA Awards ==
Year	Category	Film	Result
2004	Best Supporting Actress	Jhankaar Beats	Nominated
2006	Best Supporting Actress	My Brother…Nikhil	Nominated
2015	Best Supporting Actress	Gulaab Gang	Nominated
2025	We Can Make a Change Award		Won

== Zee Cine Awards ==
Year	Category	Film	Result
1998	Best Actress	Ishq	Nominated
1999	Best Actress	Duplicate	Nominated
2001	Best Film	Asoka	Nominated
2003	Best Film	Chalte Chalte	Nominated
2004	Best Supporting Actress	3 Deewarein	Nominated
2006	Best Supporting Actress	My Brother…Nikhil	Nominated

== Bollywood Movie Awards ==
Year	Category	Film	Result
1999	Most Sensational Actress	Duplicate	Won

== Star Screen Awards ==
Year	Category	Film	Result
1997	Best Actress	Daraar	Nominated
1998	Best Actress	Yes Boss	Nominated
2004	Best Supporting Actress	3 Deewarein	Won
2006	Best Actress	My Brother…Nikhil	Nominated
2010	Best Ensemble Cast	Luck by Chance	Won
2015	Best Actor in a Negative role	Gulaab Gang	Nominated

== Sansui Awards ==
Year	Category	Film	Result
2004	Best Supporting Actress	Jhankaar Beats	Won

== Apsara Awards ==
Year	Category	Film	Result
2004	Best Supporting Actress	Jhankaar Beats	Nominated

== Honors ==
Year	Honor	Category	Result
1984	Miss India	Miss India	Won
1984	Miss India	Miss Catwalk	Won
1984	Miss India	Miss Perfect Ten	Won
1984	Miss India	Miss Popular	Won
1984	Miss India	Miss Miraculous	Won
1984	Miss Universe	Best National Costume	Won
