= Isabel de Santa Rita Vás =

Indian author and playwright

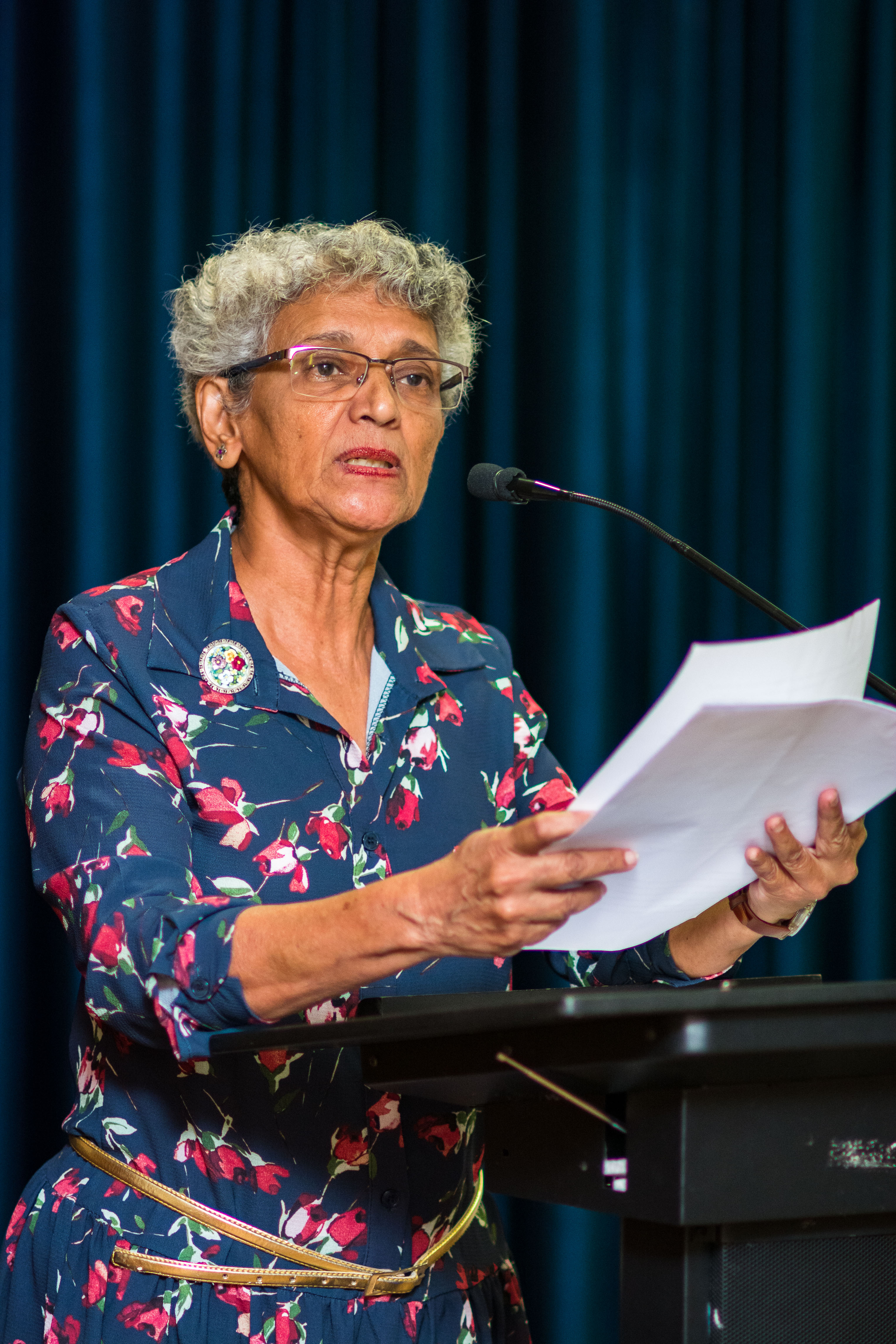
- Isabel de Santa Rita Vas in 2018
- Born: Maria Isabel de Santa Rita Vás
- Occupations: Playwright; director; professor; author
- Writing career
- Notable works: Frescoes in the Womb: Six Plays from Goa; My Name is Goa; Who Sits Behind My Eyes
- Notable awards: Goa Sudharop Fellowship (2003); Goa State Cultural Award for Excellence in Drama (2012-2013)

Maria Isabel de Santa Rita Vás is an Indian author, playwright, theatre director and teacher. She is the founder of the Mustard Seed Art Company (an amateur theatre group from Goa) and has been associated from its inception with the Positive People (an NGO that spreads awareness on HIV/AIDS and provides support to its victims). With over 65 theatre productions under the banner of The Mustard Seed Art Company, Vás has written and directed a number of plays in English. She has primarily been an educator for more than 40 years. She is the author of Frescoes in the Womb: Six Plays from Goa. She often features as a speaker at the Goa Arts and Literature Festival (GALF).

== Personal life ==
Hailing from Aldona, she currently resides in Dona Paula, near the state's capital, Panaji. She holds a Doctor of Philosophy (PhD) from Goa University.

== Career ==
=== Teaching ===
Currently a guest faculty at the Department of English, Goa University, Vás lectures MA students on creative writing. Prior to this, she worked as the head of the English Department, Dhempe College of Arts and Science, Panaji, and retired after almost 40 years of service. Holding an MA degree and a PhD, she specialises in Drama, British and American Literature.

=== Theatre ===
In 1987, Vás was approached by some students outside of school to help them in producing and performing plays. The result was an amateur theatre group, The Mustard Seed Art Company. Initially, her theatre group staged plays, based on social issues, by well-known playwrights. In 1992, she wrote and produced her first own original play, A Leaf in the Wind, after being inspired by the hardships faced by her friend, Dominic D'Souza, the first person to be diagnosed with HIV in Goa and India. She then started writing her own scripts, some of which were loosely based upon her own experiences: A Harvest of Gold (based on the exploitation of farmers), Who Killed the Ministers (a play about corruption in politics), Unmask the Mask (a play about social responsibility) and Little Boxes (a story about child labour). Her play, My Name is Goa, was performed entirely in mime, and touched upon alcoholism and the culture and history of Goa. Subsequently, she and the Company won a prize for her play, Who Sits Behind My Eyes. This play was about the life of a woman living in a fishing village, and reminded the modern generation to not forget or ignore its own traditions and community. It was inspired by a Tagore poem. In 2016, she wrote a play titled All Those Pipe Dreams, which revolved around a typically Goan family who had just bought and moved into an old mansion. In 2017, the group presented Hold Up the Sky, which was a fictional dramatisation on the life of Madame Mao, the wife of Mao Zedong, Chairman of the Chinese Communist Party (in this work of historical fiction, she found her freedom in theatre). In 2018, she wrote the group's 66th play, Famous Nobodies. In this fictional play, museum exhibits of spouses of famous personalities from history strike up a conversation. It focused on individuals like Kasturba Gandhi, Eva Braun, Marilyn Monroe and the wife of the Pulitzer Prize winner Arthur Miller.

Her Doctor of Philosophy (PhD) thesis, titled Performing Change: Theatre in the Context of Social Transformation in Three Asian Cultures in the Twentieth Century, explores theatre in China, India (specifically, West Bengal) and Sri Lanka from 1950 to 2000.

=== Other works ===
The 250th birth anniversary of Abbé Faria, the noted Goan hypnotist, was celebrated in Candolim in 2006. For this occasion, Vás made a video titled In Search of Abbé Faria and wrote a dramatization on the life of Faria, titled Kator Re Bhaji (transl. Cut the vegetables).

She knows Portuguese language, culture and its theatre and has been featured as a guest speaker on the topic of theatre in Portuguese in 20th century Goa. In 2017, she translated the play No Flowers, No Wreaths written by Orlando da Costa, current Portuguese Prime Minister António Costa's late father, into English. In a ceremony, she was given the opportunity of personally presenting her translation of the work to the prime minister, who is of Goan origin.

== Community work ==
Apart from theatre, Vás has been actively involved in community work.

=== Positive People ===
She was a close friend of the late Dominic D'Souza, Goa's first documented HIV patient (having worked with him on Mustard Seed plays). Together, they founded Positive People — Goa's first counselling group, an NGO, to raise awareness on HIV/AIDS. The discrimination and hardship faced by Dominic because of his disease inspired her to write and produce the Company's first original play in 1992, titled, A Leaf in the Wind. The 2005 Indian film My Brother…Nikhil, directed by Onir, was based on D'Souza's life although this fact goes unmentioned in the credits.

=== Other ventures ===
In 2016, she joined a new project called "Play Fools", where artistes and theatre personalities from different backgrounds (both, linguistic and professional) came together under a common banner to learn out of each other's experience.

== Works ==
=== Books ===
- Frescoes in the Womb: Six Plays from Goa (2012)

=== Plays ===
- A Leaf in the Wind (1992)
- A Harvest of Gold
- Who Killed the Ministers
- Unmask the Mask
- Little Boxes
- My Name is Goa
- Who Sits Behind My Eyes
- Kator Re Bhaji (2006)
- All Those Pipe Dreams (2016)
- Hold Up the Sky (2017)
- Famous Nobodies (2018)

=== Other works ===
- No Flowers, No Wreaths (by Orlando Costa, translated into English)
- In Search of Abbé Faria (2006, video)

== Awards ==
- Goa Sudharop Fellowship (awarded by an NGO working for the betterment of Goa) in 2003
- Goa State Cultural Award for Excellence in Drama for the year 2012-13

== See also ==
- Goa Arts and Literature Festival (GALF)
