= My Melbourne =

Indian-Australian anthology film

- Official release poster
- Directed by: Onir; Rima Das; Imtiaz Ali; Kabir Khan; Arif Ali; Rahul Vohra
- Written by: Nazifa Amir; Shivangi Bhowmick; Samira Cox; Monique Nair; William Duan; Gregory Francis; Arif Ali
- Produced by: Mitu Bhowmick Lange
- Starring: Arka Das; Arushi Sharma; Kat Stewart; Ryanna Skye Lawson; Setara Amiri; Brad Hodge; Jackson Gallagher; Mouli Ganguly; Jake Ryan; Ella Wilson
- Cinematography: Brad Francis
- Edited by: Rima Das; Irene Dhar Malik; Mitesh Soni
- Music by: Tamil Rogeon; Anurag Sharma
- Production companies: Screen Australia; VicScreen; Mind Blowing Entertainment; Mind Blowing World; Soundfirm Post Production; Anticlock Films; Flying River Films; Window Seat Films; Kabir Khan Films
- Distributed by: PVR Inox Pictures (India)
- Release dates: 22 October 2024 (MAMI); 6 March 2025 (Australia); 14 March 2025 (India)
- Running time: 119 minutes
- Countries: Australia; India
- Languages: English; Bengali; Hindi; Dari; Auslan

My Melbourne is an anthology film featuring four stories about identity and belonging, inspired by true incidents in Melbourne, Australia. The film addresses themes of diversity, sexuality, gender, disability, and race, with each directed by Indian filmmakers Onir, Rima Das, Imtiaz Ali, and Kabir Khan.

Envisioned and produced by Mitu Bhowmick Lange, the project received support from VicScreen and Screen Australia. My Melbourne had its world premiere on 15 August 2024, at the 15th Indian Film Festival of Melbourne.

The film was released theatrically in Australia, New Zealand, and Fiji on 6 March 2025, and in India on 14 March 2025.

== Plot summaries ==
My Melbourne comprises four segments, each directed by different filmmakers, addressing themes related to the LGBTQIA+, disability, gender and race. The film has four stories titled, Emma, Nandini, Jules, and Setara.

=== Emma ===
Directed by Rima Das and co-directed by Samira Cox, Emma tells the story of a talented dancer in her early twenties living with Usher's Syndrome, which is gradually affecting her hearing. Despite her passion for dancing, Emma (Ryanna Skye Lawson) struggles with discrimination in the dance industry and doubts about her future. Supported by her mother, Susan (Mikhaela Ebony), and friends like Jai (Jordan Shome), she meets Nathan (Nathan Borg), a successful deaf dancer whose self-acceptance inspires her to continue pursuing her dreams.

=== Nandini ===
Directed by Onir and co-directed by William Duan, Nandini follows the emotional reunion of Indraneel (Arka Das), a queer Indian man, and his estranged father, Mihir (Mouli Ganguly). After years of separation, the two come together in Melbourne to perform the Asthi Visarjan (ash-scattering) ceremony for Indraneel's late mother. The story revolves around themes of grief, forgiveness, and the complexities of familial relationships.

=== Jules ===
Directed by Arif Ali, with Imtiaz Ali as the creative director and Tammy Yang as the co-director, Jules centers on the unlikely friendship between Sakshi (Arushi Sharma), a newlywed food blogger, and Jules (Kat Stewart), a homeless woman in Melbourne. Despite their contrasting lives, the two women, both dealing with feelings of displacement, form a bond as they navigate their individual struggles with societal expectations and personal challenges.

=== Setara ===
Directed by Kabir Khan and co-directed by Puneet Gulati, Setara tells the story of Setara (Setara Amiri), a 15-year-old Afghan refugee who relocates to Melbourne with her mother and sister after fleeing the Taliban. As the family copes with the trauma of their past, Setara discovers a sense of belonging through cricket, which helps her rebuild her life in a new country. The film is based on Setera's own journey from Afghanistan to Melbourne as she plays herself in this film.

== Cast ==
- Kat Stewart as Jules
- Jake Ryan as Chef Leon
- Arushi Sharma as Sakshi
- Jackson Gallagher as Chris
- Arka Das as Indraneel
- Brad Hodge as Coach
- Ella Wilson as Asia
- Sepideh Fallah as Latifa/mother

== Production ==
The film was produced by Mitu Bhowmick Lange, who also serves as the director of the Indian Film Festival of Melbourne. It is an Indo-Australian collaboration, produced by Mind Blowing Films in association with VicScreen and Screen Australia. It features dialogue in English, Bengali, Hindi, Dari, and Auslan.

The film was shot entirely on location in Melbourne, Australia. Afghan singer Aryana Sayeed was brought on board to sing the title track of Setera for the film.

Minister for Creative Industries, Colin William Brooks, stated, "My Melbourne is a celebration of our city, our screen industry, and the many cultures and diverse communities that call our state home."

In June 2025, a second instalment of My Melbourne was announced, with Rajkumar Hirani, Shoojit Sircar, Anjali Menon, and Onir set to direct. The project was confirmed by Mind Blowing Films and the Indian Film Festival of Melbourne.

== Soundtrack ==
My Melbourne (Original Soundtrack)

Soundtrack album by Various Artists
- Recorded: 2024
- Genre: Feature film soundtrack
- Length: 7:20
- Language: English, Punjabi, Dari, Persian
- Producer: Tamil Rogeon; Anurag Sharma

The My Melbourne title track is written and performed by Janaki Easwar in English and Parvyn Kaur Singh in Punjabi, with music composed by Tamil Rogeon and Yidaki played by Kiernan Ironfield. The title track for Setara is composed by Anurag Sharma, sung by Aryana Sayeed.

Track List
No.	Title	Lyrics	Music	Singer(s)	Length
1.	"My Melbourne Title Track"	Janaki Easwar, Parvyn Kaur Singh	Tamil Rogeon	Janaki Easwar (English); Parvyn Kaur Singh (Punjabi)	2:10
2.	"Jaana Hai"	Anurag Sharma	Anurag Sharma	Aryana Sayeed	2:35
3.	"Azadi"	Omeed Farani (Dari)	Anurag Sharma	Aryana Sayeed	2:35
Total length:					7:20

== Release ==
My Melbourne premiered on 15 August 2024, at the 15th Indian Film Festival of Melbourne (IFFM). The film's trailer was released on 1 August 2024. The film had its international premiere on 22 October 2024, at the MAMI Mumbai Film Festival.

The film had a special screening at the 30th Kolkata International Film Festival in December 2024, held at the Nandan Film and Cultural Centre. My Melbourne was selected and screened at the 22nd Chennai International Film Festival on 14 December 2024. It was also screened as the closing film at the first Guwahati Asian Film Festival (GAFF) in February 2025.

My Melbourne was released theatrically in Australia, New Zealand, and Fiji on 6 March 2025. The film had its theatrical release in India on 14 March 2025. It is the first Australian film to receive distribution in India since 2016.

The film was screened at the International Film Festival of India in Goa in November 2025 as part of the "Spotlight: Australia" section, under which Australia was designated the festival's Spotlight Country.

== Reception ==
The film received a generally positive response, with Kalpa Jyoti Bhuyan of High On Films praising its emotional depth and direction, rating it 3 out of 5.

Hardika Gupta of NDTV rated 3/5 stars and commented that "The anthology's brilliance lies not in grandiose gestures or heavy-handed moral lessons, but in its subtle, almost poetic portrayal of individuals grappling with identity, belonging and survival in a world that often seems indifferent to their struggles." Devesh Sharma of Filmfare gave 4 stars out 5 and said that "All-in-all, My Melbourne encapsulates a variety of human experiences and leaves the viewers on a positive note." Alaka Sahani of The Indian Express rated 3/5 stars and observed that "These stories might be set in Melbourne but the universality of their themes blurs the geographical distinction. Despite being different stories, there is a sense of homogeneity that glues them together. Another binding agent is ‘hope’".

Anuj Kumar of The Hindu said that "‘Setara’ shines in this otherwise insipid multigrain recipe". Nandini Ramnath of Scroll.in writes in her review of this film that "My Melbourne ticks all the right boxes, with little insight into what it really means to sink roots Down under." Vineeta Kumar of India Today gave 3.5 stars and said that "If your idea of watching cinema is to bring a thought home, 'My Melbourne' does that, and more. It falters with its pace and lack of drama except for in 'Setara', but its heart feels at the right place". Dhaval Roy of The Times of India awarded 3 stars out of 5 and said "The anthology does not boast high production value, but its visuals are striking, and the music enhances its indie charm." Pratikshya Mishra of The Quint gave 3 stars out of 5 and said "Most of the stories’ flaws would perhaps have been fixed with a stronger sense of purpose and more finesse. And as with most anthologies, My Melbourne, is a mixed bag but it's not without its wins."

Mohar Basu of Mid-Day wrote, "What I truly enjoyed about the anthology are the people in these stories and their incredible faith in life. That unbeatable human spirit truly makes the film stand out," and rated the film 3 out of 5. Alaka Sahani from The Indian Express rated My Melbourne 3 stars out of 5, noting that the film's "four segments...are moving explorations of the characters' sense of self and identity," emphasizing the inclusive nature of the project. She also appreciated the film's universal themes, stating that it "blurs the geographical distinction," offering a powerful narrative of hope and self-discovery. Rishabh Suri from Hindustan Times rated My Melbourne 3.5 stars out of 5, praising its anthology format for being "refreshing" and "poignant." Ganesh Aaglave of Firstpost rated the film 3 out of 5 stars.

Manisha Lakhe, in her review for Livemint, described it as a "must watch". She praised the anthology for its compelling portrayal of immigrant stories, noting how it intertwines personal growth, cultural identity, and financial lessons. Amit Bhatia of ABP News rated My Melbourne 3/5, praising the distinct moods of the four stories and the engaging direction. Abhishek Srivastava of Moneycontrol rated My Melbourne 3.5/5, appreciating the performances and the diversity of the narratives, particularly Onir's Nandini. He also mentioned the film's exploration of marginalized groups and its combination of abstract and accessible storytelling, despite its niche appeal.

== Awards and recognition ==
At the 17th Jaipur International Film Festival 2025, My Melbourne won multiple awards in the Feature Film category, including Best Director (Golden Camel Award), Best Original Screenplay (Monique Nair, William Duan, Gregory Francis, Samira Cox, Arif Ali, Shivangi Bhowmick, Nazifa Amiri), Best Music (Tamil Rogeon, Anurag Sharma), and Best Production Design (Jennifer Davis). The film also received the Green Rose Award for its global message. In May 2025, the film won the Best Film award and a Special Festival Award at the 27th UK Asian Film Festival.
