= Mitu Bhowmick Lange =

Indian-Australian filmmaker, film producer and distributor

Mitu Bhowmick Lange AM
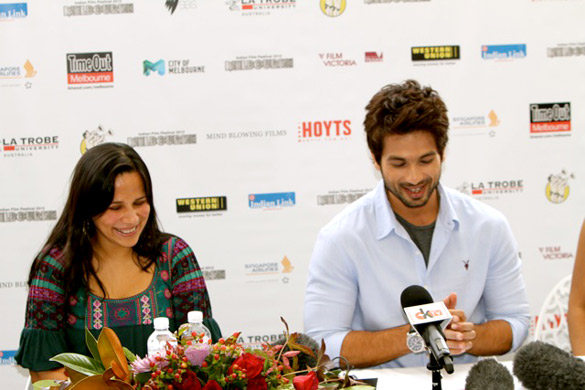
- Mitu Bhowmick Lange with actor Shahid Kapoor at a press conference for the Indian Film Festival of Melbourne in 2012.
- Born: Delhi, India
- Occupations: Film producer, Film maker, Director at Mind Blowing Films
- Organization(s): Mind Blowing Films; Indian Film Festival of Melbourne
- Spouse: Roy Lange
- Children: 1 daughter
- Family: David Lange (father-in-law)
- Awards: Jill Robb Screen Leadership Award (2017); Order of Australia (2023)

Mitu Bhowmick Lange AM is an Indian-Australian filmmaker, film producer and founder-director of Mind Blowing Films, a film distribution company that focusses on distribution of local content to Australia, New Zealand and Fiji. She is the founder and director of Indian Film Festival of Melbourne, a Victorian government funded annual film festival that started in 2010 and the Victorian Government came on board in 2012. She has also provided line production services for the Hindi films Salaam Namaste (2005), Koi Aap Sa (2005), Chak De India (2007), Bachna Ae Haseeno (2008), Main Aurr Mrs Khanna (2009) and Love Aaj Kal (2009). Lange was awarded Jill Robb Screen Leadership Award for 2017 from Film Victoria. Mitu Bhowmik was appointed as a board of member at WIFT Australia in February 2022. Mitu is also a board member at VicScreen and the part of the committee for Natalie Miller Fellowship (NMF). In 2023, Lange received the award of Member of the Order of Australia (AM) for service to performing arts through film.

== Career ==
Lange spent six years in Mumbai directing TV shows for the news, fashion and entertainment industries. She produced a daily breakfast show that ran across the networks BBC World, Sony TV, Star Plus and Zee TV. Since moving to Australia, Mitu has brought a number of Indian productions there and produced them, including 13 episodes of Kahani Ghar Ghar Kii, India's top daily television series (similar to Neighbours), Bollywood blockbusters, and a number of high-profile television commercials featuring international cricketers for the Indian market.

She is also popular for making series of four short films based on the four foundations of diversity: race, disability, sexuality, and gender. All of these films were headed by an Indian lead. She was part of a team of 4 Indians who collaborated with Victorian filmmakers for this series which was titled My Melbourne.

She has produced several Hindi films, including Salaam Namaste (2005), Koi Aap Sa (2005), Chak De India (2007), Bachna Ae Haseeno (2008), Main Aurr Mrs Khanna (2009) and Love Aaj Kal (2009).

She founded Mind Blowing Films in 2009, which releases and distributes Indian films in Australia, New Zealand, and Fiji.

In 2010, she launched the Indian Film Festival of Melbourne, a film festival showcasing Indian cinema to Australian audiences. Since then she has also been the film curator for Kolkata International Film Festival.

Lange produced Spice Girls of India (2013), which was screened at the London Feminist Film Festival. The goal of Mind Blowing World, founded in 2015 by the filmmakers John Molloy and Mitu Bhowmick Lange, was to establish a distribution platform for regional indie film. The Australian film Pawno was released by Mind Blowing World in 2015. In 2016, she co-produced Raising the Bar, an Indo-Australian documentary film about six youths with Down syndrome with Australian non-profit e.motion21.

In order to provide teachers with the knowledge and abilities necessary to meet the educational needs of students with special needs, Mitu and La Trobe University collaborated to develop Educate the Educators (ETE) in 2017. The goal of this programme was to bring together Australian and Indian educators to discuss the variety of teaching methods needed to encourage healthy learning in children with special needs. For World Down Syndrome Day in 2019, Mitu created a music video called Ode To Love to honour the love shared by 20 different fathers and their children living on two different continents. Over 57 million people have since watched the video. Mitu also worked with e.motion21, an Australian non-profit, with which she co-produced a film on disability called "Raising the Bar".

She also curates Australian and NZ films for various festivals in India. In November 2019, Lange designed and curated the Australia Focus at the 24th edition of the Kolkata International Film Festival.

In January 2023, Mitu was among the three speakers invited to speak at the 17th Pravasi Bharatiya Divas in Australia, discussing the potential of diaspora entrepreneurs, particularly women, towards nation-building, under the chair of Indian Minister of Finance Nirmala Sitharaman.

She has been appointed by the Australian Government to the Advisory Board of the Centre for Australia-India Relations, a national platform established in 2023 to promote collaboration and engagement with India. In December 2024, she was appointed to the Premier's Business Council by Premier Jacinta Allan.

In 2024, Mitu Bhowmick Lange produced My Melbourne, an anthology film directed by Indian filmmakers Imtiaz Ali, Kabir Khan, Rima Das, and Onir, featuring Melbourne-based talent and addressing themes of diversity and belonging. The project received support from VicScreen and Screen Australia.

== Filmography ==
| Year | Title | Position |
|---|---|---|
| 2005 | Salaam Namaste | Line Producer |
| 2005 | Koi Aap Sa | Line Producer |
| 2007 | Chak De! India | Line Producer |
| 2008 | Thoda Pyaar Thoda Magic | Line Producer |
| 2008 | Bachna Ae Haseeno | Line Producer |
| 2009 | Love Aaj Kal | Line Producer |
| 2009 | Main Aurr Mrs Khanna | Line Producer |
| 2013 | The Spice Girls of India | Producer |
| 2016 | Raising The Bar | Producer |
| 2013 | The Spice Girls of India | Director |
| | Watch without Prejudice | Director |
| 2018 | The Second | Executive producer |
| 2019 | Amar | Executive producer |
| | Undertow | Executive producer |
| 2020 | Kahaani Ghar Ghar Kii | Line Producer |
| 2024 | My Melbourne | Producer |

== Personal life ==
She was born and brought up in Delhi, India. She moved to Melbourne in 2002 after her marriage to Roy Lange, son of former Prime Minister of New Zealand, David Lange, and has a daughter.

== Awards ==
Mitu has won the title of the highest grossing foreign film at AIMC 4 times between 2013 and 2018 for the films Dhoom 3 (2013), PK (2014), Dangal (2016) and Sanju (2018) respectively. Dangal additionally also won the award for the best Asian Film at the AACTA. In December 2017, she received the Jill Robb Screen Leadership Award from Film Victoria for outstanding leadership, mentorship and service to the Screen Industry in Australia.

In 2018, Mitu was appointed to be on the Board of VicScreen, being the first Indian in Australia to be in this prestigious role. She was also awarded Indywood Carnival's Most Popular Indian Film Festival Abroad in 2017. Mitu was listed as one of the 10 Indian Origin Women Making a Difference in Australia by The Australia Today in 2022.

In the 2023 Australia Day Honours list, Mitu Bhowmick was appointed an Honorary Member (AM) in the General Division of the Order of Australia for significant service to the performing arts, specifically through film. In March 2025, she received the Film, Fashion, and Beauty Icon Award at The Australia Today International Women’s Day Awards for her work in cinema.
