= Raising the Bar (film) =

2016 Australian/Indian documentary film

- Directed by: Onir
- Produced by: Mitu Bhowmick Lange, e.motion21
- Distributed by: Mind Blowing Films
- Release date: August 2016 (Indian Film Festival Melbourne)
- Countries: Australia, India

Raising the Bar is a 2016 documentary film that follows six young individuals with Down syndrome from Australia and India who perform a dance routine at the World Down Syndrome Congress 2015 in Chennai, India. The film is directed by Onir and co-produced by Mitu Bhowmick Lange and e.motion21, a non-profit Australian organisation.

The film won the Best Documentary award at the Melbourne City Independent Film Awards 2018. It was part of the official selection at the Maryland International Film Festival 2017 and the Ethan Saylor Memorial Film Festival 2017.

== Synopsis ==
The film traces the journeys of six young individuals with Down syndrome and their families in India and Australia as they prepare to perform at the World Down Syndrome Congress 2015 in Chennai, India. As they prepare themselves, the documentary portrays their ordinariness and the challenges that they face while providing insight into the vastly different cultures and communities across the two countries. The film culminates with them performing and meeting each other at the congress.

== Production ==
The film was shot in Melbourne, Kolhapur, Delhi, Agra, and Chennai in 2015.

== Reception ==
=== Critical response ===
Raising The Bar was well-received by critics who praised it for its intimate camerawork and "intrinsically moving" theme.
