= Juhi Chawla =

Indian actress (born 1967)

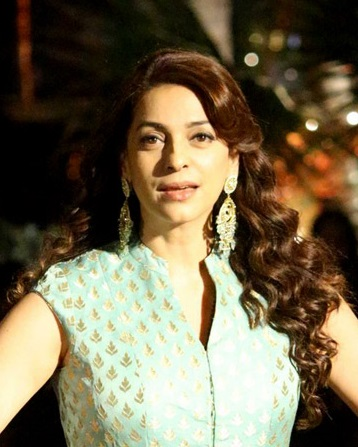
- Chawla in 2017
- Born: 13 November 1967 (age 59); Ambala, Haryana, India
- Other name: Juhi Chawla Mehta
- Occupation: Actress
- Years active: 1984–present
- Works: Full list
- Spouse: Jay Mehta (m. 1995)
- Children: 2
- Awards: Full list

Juhi Chawla Mehta (née Chawla; born 13 November 1967) is an Indian actress. She established herself as one of the leading actresses of Hindi cinema from the late 1980s through the early 2000s. Recognised for her comic timing and vivacious on-screen persona, she is the recipient of several accolades, including two Filmfare Awards. As of 2025, she is the wealthiest Indian actress, with a net worth of ₹7,790 crore (US$830 million).

After winning the 1984 Miss India beauty pageant, Chawla made her acting debut with a brief appearance in the Hindi film Sultanat (1986), and had her breakthrough role in the tragic romance film Qayamat Se Qayamat Tak (1988), which earned her the Filmfare Award for Best Female Debut. The year 1993 was key in her career, as she gained recognition for her starring roles in Lootere, Aaina, Darr, and Hum Hain Rahi Pyar Ke, winning the Filmfare Award for Best Actress for the lattermost. Further success came in 1997 with Deewana Mastana, Yes Boss, Mr. and Mrs. Khiladi, and Ishq.

In the following decade, Chawla began playing against type in art-house projects, garnering critical acclaim for her performances in Jhankaar Beats (2003), 3 Deewarein (2003), My Brother Nikhil (2005), I Am (2011) and Gulaab Gang (2014). She also starred in several Punjabi films, including the biopics Shaheed Udham Singh (2000), Des Hoyaa Pardes (2004), Waris Shah: Ishq Daa Waaris (2006) and Sukhmani – Hope for Life (2010). Among her television work, she was a talent judge on the third season of the dance reality show Jhalak Dikhhla Jaa (2009) and had supporting roles in the streaming series Hush Hush (2022) and The Railway Men (2023).

Chawla has been married to industrialist Jay Mehta since 1995, with whom she has two children. Along with her husband and Shah Rukh Khan, she is the co-owner of the Indian Premier League cricket team Kolkata Knight Riders. Along with Khan, she co-founded the production company Dreamz Unlimited, which produced three films, beginning with their self-starring Phir Bhi Dil Hai Hindustani (2000).

== Early life ==
Chawla was born in Ambala, Haryana on 13 November 1967. Her father was an officer of the Indian Revenue Service (IRS). She completed her schooling at Fort Convent School, Bombay (present-day Mumbai), and graduated from Sydenham College, Bombay. Chawla was the winner of the Miss India title in 1984. She also won the Best Costume Award at the Miss Universe contest in 1984.

== Career ==
=== Breakthrough (1986–1990) ===
Chawla's debut role in Bollywood was a small part in the 1986 film Sultanat. In 1987, she starred in Kannada-Tamil bilingual film Premaloka (Paruva Ragam in Tamil) directed and produced by V. Ravichandran. The Kannada version turned out to be a major commercial success and proved to be a break-through film for the lead cast and technical crew.

She got her first major Hindi cinema role in Qayamat Se Qayamat Tak in 1988, in which she starred with Aamir Khan. The film, a modern-day adaption of Shakespeare's Romeo and Juliet, was both a major critical and commercial success, with Khan and Chawla becoming "overnight stars". It won the Filmfare Award for Best Film, and Chawla became the first actress to win the Filmfare Award for Lux New Face of the Year, also receiving her first nomination for Best Actress. Chawla's pairing with Aamir Khan and their on-screen chemistry was often cited by the media as successful. The film has since attained a cult status, with The Times of India ranking it among the "Top 25 Must See Bollywood Films", calling it "one of the landmark films of Hindi cinema" and crediting it with making "Aamir Khan and Juhi Chawla household names". Premankur Biswas of First Post wrote in a retrospective review, "Juhi Chawla, with her flouncy ghagra and passive but assertive demeanor was an early predecessor to the sexually liberated Bollywood heroines of today. She wore what she wanted and initiated a relationship with the man she desired". The team Premaloka reunited in 1989 for the Kannada film Kindari Jogi and was declared a musical hit. In the same year she debuted in Telugu cinema with the film Vicky Daada co-starring Nagarjuna.

=== Established actress (1990–1997) ===
In 1990, she starred in Pratibandh. She also received her second Best Actress nomination at Filmfare for the film. Her other releases that year included the family drama Swarg alongside Rajesh Khanna and Govinda, which marked the first of several collaborations with director David Dhawan. In 1991, she collaborated third time with actor-director V Ravichandran for his multilingual directorial Shanti Kranti (Nattukku Oru Nallavan in Tamil). The film, made with an expensive budget, underperformed at the box office leading into huge losses to the makers. The Tamil version saw her pairing opposite Rajinikanth. In 1992, she appeared in Bol Radha Bol alongside Rishi Kapoor, for which she received her third Filmfare nomination for Best Actress. Another pairing with Aamir Khan in Daulat Ki Jung resulted in negative reviews.

In 1993, Chawla appeared in four films. Her first release was the action romance film Lootere, directed by Dharmesh Darshan and starring Sunny Deol, Naseeruddin Shah, Chunkey Pandey and Anupam Kher. She played a young woman who receives witness protection through the service of a bodyguard, played by Deol, with whom she eventually falls in love. This was the first movie in which she was cast in a glamorous role. Later, she was cast in two movies produced by Yash Chopra. The first was the romantic drama Aaina, which saw Chawla and Amrita Singh play sisters falling for the same man, played by Jackie Shroff. Her third film that year was Mahesh Bhatt's romantic comedy Hum Hain Rahi Pyar Ke opposite Aamir Khan, which was a success with both critics and audiences. Her performance as a Tamilian runaway, which required her to master Tamil language and dialect, met with acclaim and established her as a comic actress. Writing for The Indian Express, Udaya Tara Nayar noted that she played her role "to perfection". She won a Filmfare Award for Best Actress for her work. The last film she appeared in that year was the musical psychological thriller Darr, directed by Yash Chopra. The film was one of the highest-grossing films of the year, making it Chawla's fourth consecutive box office hit of the year. Darr was also a major critical success, winning several awards including the National Film Award for Best Popular Film Providing Wholesome Entertainment. She played Kiran, a young woman about to get married with her fiancé (Deol) when she becomes the object of a young man's (Khan) obsession.

Subsequently, she played leading roles in several films, most notably as Saraswati in David Dhawan's Andaz (1994), Laxmi in Surendra Kumar Bohra's Saajan Ka Ghar (1994), Bela in Rajiv Mehra's Ram Jaane (1995), Sandhya in Naajayaz (1995), which marked one of her rare collaborations with Ajay Devgn, and Kiran in David Dhawan and Boney Kapoor's Loafer (1996), and all of them emerged as critical and commercial successes. She received critical acclaim for her performance as a battered wife in Abbas Mustan's thriller Daraar (1996), and she received a nomination of Filmfare Award for Best Actress for her performance in the film. The film was not a major commercial success, but Chawla's performance earned her positive reviews. She was also offered Karisma Kapoor's role in Dil To Pagal Hai (1997), but she turned it down. Chawla's career had hit its peak, and she regained mainstream success in 1997 with the romantic comedies Yes Boss, Deewana Mastana and Ishq, all becoming box office hits. Ishq became one of the top-earners of the year, and earned critical praise for the performances of its four leads.

In the romantic comedy Yes Boss, she played a model who becomes the love interest of an ad agency owner and his ambitious employee, played by Aditya Pancholi and Shah Rukh Khan, respectively. Yes Boss opened to favourable reviews and did well commercially, and Chawla received a seventh Filmfare nomination for her portrayal, which was described by Screen as "spirited". In a 1998 retrospective review for The Times of India, Khushboo Tiwari called it "a quintessential ‘90s romcom" and took note of Chawla's chemistry with Khan. In the comedy Deewana Mastana, Chawla played Dr. Neha Sharma, love interest to both Kapoor and Govinda and ends up marrying Salman Khan. The film was a commercial success. Her other release of the year was Mr and Mrs Khiladi alongside Akshay Kumar. The film turned out to be an average grosser at the box-office.

=== Setback (1998–1999) ===
In 1998, she appeared once again alongside Shah Rukh Khan in Duplicate, the film was produced by Yash Johar and directed by Mahesh Bhatt. Despite ranking as the 12th highest grosser of the year, the film underperformed at the box office upon its release. The same year, she appeared in Hrishikesh Mukherjee's swan song Jhooth Bole Kauwa Kaate alongside Anil Kapoor; the film was received well by critics for its reminiscence of Mukherjee's films, with one critic calling it a "a classy comedy". The same year, she also appeared in Priyadarshan's rural drama Saat Rang Ke Sapne opposite Arvind Swamy. The film underperformed at the box-office, but Khalid Mohamed wrote of her that she is "only saving grace. Lovely to look at and an instinctive actress, she's a likeable as ever." The same year, she starred in the Malayalam detective comedy Harikrishnans opposite Mohanlal and Mammootty. Harikrishnans was a commercial success.

In 1999, she appeared in Arjun Pandit opposite Sunny Deol. She played a woman who seeks revenge in the film and described her character as "a role with negative shades". The film was the thirteenth highest-grossing film of 1999, and emerged as a critical and commercial success. Chawla's work was well received in this movie. The same year, she also starred opposite Sanjay Dutt in the adventure film Safari, a critical and commercial failure. She worked free of charge in the Punjabi-language biographical film Shaheed Udham Singh, based on the life of Udham Singh.

=== Resurgence and professional expansion (2000–2009) ===
In 2000, alongside Shah Rukh Khan and Aziz Mirza, she opened a production company called Dreamz Unlimited. The romantic comedy Phir Bhi Dil Hai Hindustani was the company's first production starring Chawla and Khan. Upon release, the film underperformed at the box office, though over the years it has been appreciated for its bold theme on media wars. Chawla's performance as the journalist Ria Banarjee received appreciation from the critics. Rediff critic Swapna Mitter wrote, "This is probably one of Juhi's best performances. She has never looked better... and once again, like Hum Hain Rahi Pyar Ke, she shows a flair for comedy." Her other release of the year was Rakesh Roshan's delayed Karobaar: The Business of Love, which was in the making for over five years and failed upon release. She played a small role in Gang.

In 2001, she appeared in the action comedy One 2 Ka 4 with Shah Rukh Khan, in their seventh collaboration and with Jackie Shroff, the film was a flop at the box office. Chawla played three roles in the film; a haryanvi maid, a bar dancer and an undercover cop. While the film was noticed for its serious content, her comedic performance won acclaim from several critics. Vinayak Chakravorty wrote, "But the winner here is Juhi — that vintage comic flair of Hum Hain Raahi Pyaar Ke almost comes back from the dead." Similarly, Nikhat Kazmi of The Times of India "The only saving grace in this sea of confusion is Juhi. As a fast talking Haryanvi loudmouth who has the hots for her 'Ricky Martin' (Shahrukh), she is an absolute delight." The Hindu agreed with this observation, further noting her "unfailing sense of humour" and timing, which "few can match". Another release of the year was the comedy Aamdani Atthani Kharcha Rupaiyaa opposite Govinda. Around the same time, she signed a Kannada film Adhishesha, in which she was to star opposite her Premaloka co–star V. Ravichandran.

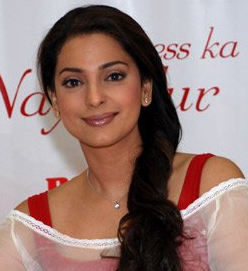
Chawla in 2009

Having taken a one-year break from film work, Chawla started appearing in independent and art films, and her work included critically acclaimed films Jhankaar Beats, 3 Deewarein (both 2003), 7½ Phere and My Brother Nikhil (both 2005), and Bas Ek Pal (2006). Jhankaar Beats, a musical comedy and a tribute to music director R. D. Burman, saw her play the wife of an aspiring musician. She won a Star Screen Award for Best Supporting Actress for 3 Deewarein, which earned her positive reviews. Director Kukunoor wrote the film with Chawla in mind, aspiring to change her image. Robert Koehler of Variety wrote, "Chawla gradually settles into a role that contains at least three different character layers to it." Chawla said 3 Deewarein was a mould-breaking film in her career, and spoke of the revealing experience in making non-mainstream films which require a more realistic approach to acting and minimal use of make-up. She acted opposite Gurdas Mann in the Punjabi-language feature Des Hoyaa Pardes (2004) which was warmly received. She said she chose the part because upon reading the script, she identified a "tremendous scope for performance". The film won the National Film Award for Best Feature Film in Punjabi.

Set in Goa between 1986 and 1994, Onir's My Brother Nikhil centers on the character of Nikhil (played by Sanjay Suri), a young man who is tested HIV-positive. Chawla co-starred as Anamika Kapoor, a schoolteacher by profession and Nikhil's loving and supportive elder sister, who accepts his same-gender partner and stands by his side through his struggle. The film opened to a welcome reception by critics, and Chawla's performance was particularly praised. Khalid Mohamed was highly approving of her portrayal: "Above all, Juhi Chawla is perfect. Her effortless blend of conflicting emotions is what A-class acting is all about. Ms Chawla is a diamond in this little gem of a movie." She starred alongside Irfan Khan in 7½ Phere. Hindustan Times commended her comic performance.

In 2006, she appeared in the ensemble drama Salaam-e-Ishq: A Tribute To Love directed by Nikhil Advani. She collaborated with Onir once again with in the drama Bas Ek Pal (2006) alongside Urmila Matondkar and Sanjay Suri. She played Ira Malhotra, a battered wife who refuses to leave her possessive husband for religious reasons. The film opened to positive reviews. Subhash K. Jha wrote of Chawla that she "uses her ability to portray hurt and guilt with minimum effort." The same year she starred in another Punjabi film, the historical drama Waris Shah: Ishq Daa Waaris, which won a National Film Award. According to the BBC, the film "bears the hallmarks of a quality production". The film is based on the life of Punjabi poet Waris Shah during the times he wrote the poem Heer.

Chawla and Manoj Bajpayee played a married couple in Ganesh Acharya's drama Swami (2007), which follows their financial struggles to secure proper education for their intelligent son. Reviews of the film were varied. Tanveer Bookwala of Rediff appreciated the film for its simple story and for giving the lead pair "the chance to be unconventional and subtle and they do not fail to deliver."

Chawla then appeared in Ravi Chopra's Bhoothnath (2008) with Amitabh Bachchan, in which she made her singing debut with the song "Chalo Jaane Do", the film was a moderate success and Chawla was appreciated for her role. Manish Gajjar from BBC wrote, "Juhi Chawla's brilliant comic timing as Banku's mum has you in stitches." Another film called Krazzy 4 with Irfan Khan and Arshad Warsi was released in 2008, the film failed to do well at the box office. In 2009, she appeared in a cameo appearance in Luck By Chance to play a comic part for which she dyed her hair blonde. The film and Chawla's performance got highly positive reviews and got a good opening at the box office.

=== Intermittent acting roles (2010–present) ===
Chawla starred in Onir's critically acclaimed anthology film I Am (2010). Unfolded in several chapters, the film starred Chawla alongside Manisha Koirala in an episode named "I Am Megha". She played the title role of a Kashmiri Pandit who travels back to her hometown in Srinagar, having been driven out of it years ago. For her performance, Chawla was awarded the Best Actress award at the 13th London Asian Film Festival and Award for Excellence in Hindi Cinema at the Asiavision Movie Awards. Her performance also earned her a nomination for the Filmfare Award for Best Supporting Actress. Rajeev Masand wrote, "Juhi Chawla is a portrait of suppressed vulnerability as she confronts her feelings about an old home and an old friend."

Chawla next starred in the action comedy Son of Sardaar (2012) opposite Sanjay Dutt, which was poorly received by critics. Live Mint called it "the worst portrayal of Punjabiyat in Hindi cinema", although it referred to her part as "the only unique role in the film" and further noted, "An actor with proven talent for comedy, Chawla makes Pammi, her character, pathetic as well as feisty." The film earned ₹169.98 crore (US$18 million) worldwide.

After a period of limited work in films, Chawla made a comeback in 2014 with Gulaab Gang opposite her once-archrival Madhuri Dixit. The film, in which Chawla and Dixit played ruthless political rivals, marked Chawla's role as an antagonist. Her portrayal of Sumitra Devi, a shrewd and conniving politician, was widely appreciated by critics. Shubhra Gupta of The Financial Times described her character as "the sort of politician that men have played for ever: hungry for power, will stop at nothing, not even murder and mayhem. She rules with an iron fist and a sneer." Hindustan Times wrote, "An effective hero needs a larger-than-life villain. In this case, it is Juhi Chawla who marries her sister to a rapist and apparently killed her husband to get political power. Like most corrupt politicians we see onscreen, she is an opportunist who lusts for power. It speaks well about her acting prowess that we come to hate the otherwise effervescent Juhi in this film." Anupama Chopra wrote, "Her perverse wickedness is the best part of the film", but called it a "a one-note character". Rajeev Masand called her "terrific" in the part and concluded a scathing review of the film asserting, "if you must watch this film, watch it for Juhi Chawla's inspired performance." She received a second Filmfare nomination for Best Supporting Actress. The same year she also appeared with Helen Mirren and Om Puri in a guest role in the Steven Spielberg-produced Hollywood film The Hundred Foot Journey.

In 2016, she starred in the woman-centric drama Chalk n Duster with Shabana Azmi. The film received mixed reviews from critics and Chawla's performance was well received. In a critical review for The Hindu, Namrata Joshi noted "Azmi and Chawla who, with their dignified presence and easy camaraderie stop you from heading to the exit door." Rohit Vats of Hindustan Times liked the film for its "well told ethics versus greed story" and mentioned Chawla's heartwarming presence. In 2017, she played an Indian defence minister in the Alt Balaji web series The Test Case.

Chawla starred in the web series Hush Hush, which released on Amazon Prime Video in 2022.

== Off-screen work ==
In 1998, Chawla participated in a concert tour entitled Awesome Foursome alongside Shah Rukh Khan, Kajol, and Akshay Kumar across the United Kingdom, Canada and the United States.

In 2009, Chawla featured as a talent judge, for the third season of Sony Entertainment Television India's dance reality show, Jhalak Dikhhla Jaa alongside Saroj Khan and Vaibhavi Merchant. In 2011, she hosted Colors's kid's chat-show Badmaash Company- Ek Shararat Hone Ko Hai.

In 2008, Chawla, in partnership with Shah Rukh Khan and her husband Jay Mehta, acquired ownership rights for the franchise representing Kolkata in the Twenty20 cricket tournament Indian Premier League (IPL) for US$75.09 million, and named the team Kolkata Knight Riders (KKR). The team won in 2012 and repeated the feat in 2014.

Delhi High Court imposed a ₹20 lakh fine on Chawla after it found a lawsuit filed by Chawla against the setting up of 5G wireless networks to be 'frivolous'. The fine was later reduced to ₹2 lakh.

== Personal life ==
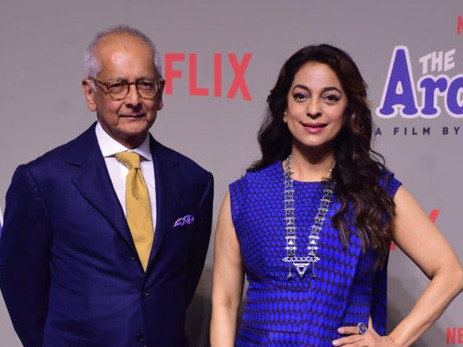
Chawla with husband Jay Mehta in 2023

Chawla married industrialist Jay Mehta in 1995. The couple has two children. In an interview Chawla revealed that her daughter Jhanvi wants to be a writer, instead of joining films.

Her brother Bobby Chawla was the CEO of Red Chillies Entertainment. He suffered a massive stroke in 2010 after a dinner party. After being in coma for about four years, he died on 9 March 2014. Her sister, Sonia, died of cancer on 30 October 2012. Chawla is a vegetarian.

== Reception and media image ==
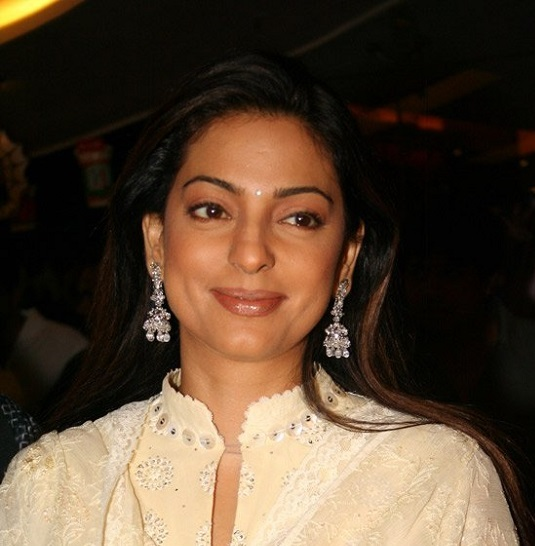
Chawla at an event

Chawla is considered in the media as one of the most popular actresses of Bollywood. India Today named her in their "Top Bollywood Actresses" list. Chawla appeared in Box Office India's "Top Actresses" list from 1992 to 1997. She was also placed in Times of India's "50 Beautiful Faces" list. In 2024, Chawla became the richest actress in India, with a net worth of ₹4,600 crore (US$490 million). In 2025, several websites reported her net worth to be ₹7,790 crore (US$830 million).

As an actor, throughout most of her early career, she was particularly recognised for her comic timing and vivacious on-screen persona. Despite her success, Chawla has faced periods of commercial decline. Asked about some of the commercial flunctuations in her career, Chawla attributed them to wrong choices. Following the birth of her daughter and amidst the poor box-office performance of Chawla's work in the early 2000s, Chawla took a short break from acting in 2001 and spoke of her intention to come back with more serious roles. Eventually she felt her new choices had given her a new identity and constant interest. Several outlets noted her transition to serious cinema. Chawla said that with films like 3 Deewarein and My Brother Nikhil, she received satisfaction as an actor.

== Awards and nominations ==
Chawla has received two Filmfare Awards. She won the Best Female Debut for Qayamat Se Qayamat Tak and Best Actress for Hum Hain Rahi Pyar Ke. She received six more Best Actress nominations for Qayamat Se Qayamat Tak, Pratibandh, Bol Radha Bol, Darr, Daraar and Yes Boss. In addition to this, she received Best Supporting Actress nomination for I Am and Gulaab Gang.

== See also ==
- List of Indian film actresses
- Mehta Group

Awards
Preceded by Rekha Hande	Miss India; 1984	Succeeded by Sonu Walia
