= Dominic D'Souza =

Indian AIDS activist

- Died: 27 May 1992; Bombay, Maharashtra, India
- Occupation: Activist
- Organization: Positive People

Dominic D'Souza was an Indian AIDS activist. His life was the basis of the film My Brother…Nikhil (directed by Onir) and is also obliquely referred to in the novel The Lost Flamingoes of Bombay by Siddharth Dhanvant Shanghvi. However, in neither case do these works acknowledge D'Souza as their inspiration. D'Souza was a frequent blood donor and a worker at the World Wildlife Fund. In 1989, after mandatory blood testing under The Goa, Daman and Diu Public Health Act, 1985, he was found to have contracted HIV, making him Goa's patient zero for the virus. Upon learning he was infected, authorities forcibly quarantined him, keeping him isolated in a tuberculosis ward for 64 days.

He legally fought against the quarantine and, following his release, resigned his position at the World Wildlife Fund. Together with his friend Isabel de Santa Rita Vas, he founded the HIV/AIDS non-governmental organization Positive People in April 1992. D'Souza died in a Mumbai hospital in May 1992, a month after registering the new organization.

== Early life ==
Dominic D'Souza was born in British Colonial Africa. He returned to his ancestral home in Parra, Goa when he was still fairly young. There he lived with his mother, his aunt, and some of his siblings. The D'Souza's were practicing Goan Catholics.

As a young man he was one of the first actors to participate in the Mustard Seed Art Company, Goa's most notable English-language theater, founded by Isabel de Santa Rita Vas. He performed in the company's first two shows.

== Imprisonment and court case ==
On the morning of February 14, 1989, Dominic was taken from his Parra, Goa home which he shared with his mother and aunt by a local police officer who asked him to accompany him to the police station in Mapusa. Upon arrival to the police station, Dominic was escorted to the local Asilo Hospital in a police van with no indication why he was there. He was familiar with the Asilo Hospital, being a frequent blood donor. He was placed in a room and interrogated about his health. Dominic tried to learn why he was being detained, but none of the doctors would answer his questions. From the room, he caught a glimpse of a doctor recording his name in a register labeled 'AIDS' and this was how he learned of his diagnosis.

The police handcuffed him and escorted him to an abandoned tuberculosis sanatorium in Corlim, Goa. He was locked inside with armed guards standing at attention just outside the doors. He spent 64 days in quarantine. While he was isolated, his mother Lucy D'Souza filed a writ petition in the Panaji bench of the Bombay High Court, which presided over Goa even though Bombay was a part of Maharashtra. She and the legal team led by Anand Grover argued that Section 53 of the Goa Public Health Act—a section added in the 1987 amendment to specify restrictions and provisions regarding AIDS—violated articles 14, 19, 21, and 226 of the Indian Constitution, as well as the government-endorsed World Health Organization guidelines. Though the case dragged on for months, the court issued an interim order in mid-April releasing Dominic from the sanatorium and confining him instead to house arrest at his home in Parra.

The court came to a decision in December 1989, ruling against Dominic. The court re-inforced the power of the legislature to make such laws at their own discretion. Dominic was released from house arrest that December.

== Activism ==
After being released from house arrest, Dominic was fired from his job at the World Wildlife Fund, and went to work for Norma Alvares, a woman who had contributed to his court case and had much experience with NGOs. He became involved in the global community of people living with AIDS. After attending several conferences in Europe about AIDS, he decided to start his own organization in 1992.

Positive People was registered in May 1992, only weeks before his death. He worked passionately on creating counseling for those who had HIV and those who were at risk for contracting it. He organized awareness campaigns at local schools and colleges.

The organization continues to be the largest of its kind in Goa. Positive People still advocates for people living with AIDS today.

== See also ==
- HIV/AIDS in India
