= Daulat Ki Jung =

Daulat Ki Jung दौलत की जंग
- Theatrical release poster
- Directed by: S. A. Kader
- Produced by: Jalil Ahmed
- Starring: Aamir Khan; Juhi Chawla
- Music by: Anand–Milind
- Release date: 17 January 1992
- Country: India
- Language: Hindi

Daulat Ki Jung : War of Wealth is a 1992 Hindi-language action-adventure film starring Aamir Khan, Juhi Chawla in lead roles, along with Paresh Rawal, Dalip Tahil, Kiran Kumar, Kader Khan in supporting roles. The film was a box office failure.

== Plot ==
The film is 'inspired' from the Hollywood classic Mackenna's Gold. This film is based on a treasure hunt. Bhushan Chaudhry (Shafi Inamdar) and Mr. Agarwal (Tiku Talsania) are business rivals, and hate each other. Their children, Rajesh Chaudhry (Aamir Khan) and Asha Agarwal (Juhi Chawla) study in the same class in college, and are in love with each other. Both are terrified of what their parents will do when they find out about their romance. And when the parents do find out, all kinds of restrictions are placed on them. Unable to stay away from each other, they elope in a stolen car. On the way, they come across an injured man, and decide to take him to hospital. The young couple become mixed up with two rival groups of crooks who are after treasure in a tribal village set in a remote forest somewhere off Mumbai. Rajesh who has a photographic memory, gets hold of the treasure map, and after a quick survey eats it up in order to protect himself and Asha. They are closely followed by their irate parents who do not want them to marry each other. They get caught in the tribal village and is released in an almost miraculous manner. In the end the two lovers are united and the crooks are killed by a CBI officer who was in disguise.

== Cast ==
- Aamir Khan as Rajesh Chaudhry
- Juhi Chawla as Asha Agarwal
- Paresh Rawal as Hari Bhai
- Dalip Tahil as Mike
- Kiran Kumar as Rana
- Kader Khan as CID Inspector Sher Khan / K.K. Topji
- Shafi Inamdar as Bhushan Chaudhry
- Tiku Talsania as Mr. Agarwal
- Viju Khote as Inspector Godbole
- Mehmood Jr. as Chhotu
- Ram Sethi as Auctioneer
- B. M. Vyas as Guruji of Tribal Leader

== Soundtrack ==
Music: Anand-Milind | Lyrics: Majrroh Sultanpuri wrote the songs.

| # | Title | Singer(s) |
|---|---|---|
| 1 | "Ruthi Aankhen Lekar Mujhko" | Anuradha Paudwal |
| 2 | "Hai Daiya Jhumke Ki" | Kavita Krishnamurthy |
| 3 | "Ab Teer Chalen Talwar" | Udit Narayan, Anuradha Paudwal |
| 4 | "Ab Teer Chalen Talwar" (Sad) | Anuradha Paudwal |
| 5 | "Samjha Karo Baat" | Udit Narayan |
| 6 | "Bolo Sanam Kya" | Udit Narayan, Anuradha Paudwal |
