= Safari (1999 film) =

- Directed by: Jyotin Goel
- Written by: Jyotin Goel
- Produced by: Jyotin Goel
- Starring: Sanjay Dutt; Juhi Chawla
- Cinematography: Cham K. Bajoo
- Edited by: Omkar Bakhri
- Music by: Shyam-Mohan
- Release date: 11 June 1999
- Country: India
- Language: Hindi

Safari is a 1999 Indian Hindi-language romantic adventure film directed by Jyotin Goel and starring Sanjay Dutt and Juhi Chawla.

== Premise ==
Captain Kishan (Sanjay Dutt) is the son of a former ship captain and is called Captain in his honor & lives a life full of adventure on a small island named 'Manjira'. Anjali (Juhi Chawla) wants to build a factory on the Island and meets Captain in this regard. Then begins their journey full of adventure.

== Cast ==
- Sanjay Dutt... Kishan "Captain" Jatin Khanna
- Juhi Chawla... Anjali
- Tanuja... Asha
- Suresh Oberoi... Ajit Aggarwal
- Mohnish Bahl... Shekhar Panchotia
- Raza Murad... Father Felix
- Sharat Saxena... Gwana
- Sudhir... Uncle D'Silva
- Avtar Gill... Police Inspector Avtar Singh
- Sanjay Goradia... Johnson
- Ghanshyam Rohera... Tiger (as Ghanshyam)

== Music ==
Music of the film is given by Shyam-Mohan.

1. "Koo Koo Dil Yeh Bole" - Kavita Krishnamurthy, Kumar Sanu
2. "Tumse Mohabbat" - Kumar Sanu, Sadhana Sargam
3. "Yeh Safari" - Amit Kumar
4. "Aalaa Re Paaus Aalaa" - Alka Yagnik, Amit Kumar
5. "Kluk Kluk Kluk Koi Samjhaaye Mujhe" - Amit Kumar, Sadhana Sargam, Mohnish Behl
6. "Arre Tu Hai Kamaal" - Udit Narayan, Kavita Krishnamurthy
