= Hush Hush (TV series) =

Indian thriller television series

- Genre: Drama
- Created by: Tanuja Chandra
- Screenplay by: Ashish Mehta
- Story by: Shikhaa Sharma; Juhi Chaturvedi
- Directed by: Ashish Pandey; Kopal Naithani; Tanuja Chandra
- Starring: Juhi Chawla; Ayesha Jhulka; Karishma Tanna; Kritika Kamra; Shahana Goswami; Soha Ali Khan; Gaurav Dwivedi
- Composer: Hrishi Giridhar
- Country of origin: India
- Original language: Hindi
- No. of seasons: 1
- No. of episodes: 7 (list of episodes)

Production
- Producers: Shikhaa Sharma; Tanuja Chandra; Vikram Malhotra
- Cinematography: Shaz Mohammed
- Editor: Chandan Arora
- Camera setup: Multi-camera
- Running time: 30-50 minutes
- Production company: Abundantia Entertainment

Original release
- Network: Amazon Prime Video
- Release: 22 September 2022

Hush Hush is an Indian Hindi-language drama television series created and directed by Tanuja Chandra. The series stars Juhi Chawla, Ayesha Jhulka, Karishma Tanna, Kritika Kamra, Shahana Goswami and Soha Ali Khan in the lead. It was produced under the banner of Abundantia Entertainment, and premiered on Amazon Prime Video on 22 September 2022.

== Cast ==
- Juhi Chawla as Isha 'Ishi' Sangamitra, Meera, Saiba, Zair, and Dolly's best friend
- Ayesha Jhulka as Meera Yadav
- Karishma Tanna as Inspector Geeta Tehlan
- Kritika Kamra as Dolly Dalal, Aditya's wife
- Shahana Goswami as Zaira Sheikh
- Soha Ali Khan as Saiba
- Nisha Jindal as Rekha
- Benjamin Gilani as Baldev Dalal, Aditya's father
- Bharti Sharma as Manjit Dalal, Aditya's mother
- Kumkum Jain as Veena
- Nitish Kapoor as Aditya Dalal, Dolly's husband
- Jamini Pathak as Kashi
- Vibha Chibber as ACP Madhu
- Abhijeet Singh as SI Karan Singh
- Vedant Chibber as Zayn, Saiba and Ranveer's son
- Chaitanya Choudhry as Ranveer, Saiba's husband
- Gaurav Dwivedi as Vinayak Sethi
- Kavya Trehan as Meher
- Ariana Dogra
- Jaaved Jaaferi as CBI Officer Shantanu

== Episodes ==
=== Series overview ===
Series	Episodes	Originally released
1	7	22 September 2022

=== Season 1 (2022) ===
No. overall	No. in season	Title	Directed by	Written by	Original release date
1	1	"What Lies Beneath"	Tanuja Chandra	Shikhaa Sharma	22 September 2022
2	2	"What Can’t Be Said"	Tanuja Chandra	Shikhaa Sharma	23 September 2022
3	3	"What Can’t Be Killed"	Tanuja Chandra	Shikhaa Sharma	23 September 2022
4	4	"What The Past Holds"	Tanuja Chandra	Shikhaa Sharma	23 September 2022
5	5	"What Keeps Us Awake"	Tanuja Chandra	Shikhaa Sharma	23 September 2022
6	6	"What Remains Unseen"	Tanuja Chandra	Shikhaa Sharma	23 September 2022
7	7	"What Is To Be Known"	Tanuja Chandra	Shikhaa Sharma	23 September 2022

== Production ==
=== Development ===
The announcement of the series was made by Amazon Prime in the first week of March 2021 to be directed by Tanuja Chandra, starring Juhi Chawla, Ayesha Jhulka, Soha Ali Khan, Karishma Tanna, Kritika Kamra and Shahana Goswami.

The principal photography of the film started in mid-September 2021. Filming took place in New Delhi, Gurgaon, and Mumbai, before wrapping up in April 2022.

=== Release ===
The trailer of the series was released on 13 September 2022. The series consisting of seven episodes premiered on Amazon Prime Video from 22 September 2022.

== Critical reception ==
ThePrint's Tina Das rated the series three out of five stars, writing that Hush Hush "loses steam" after the first four episodes. The entertainment website 123telugu.com gave the series 2.75 stars out of five, concluding that despite "decent twists and splendid performances," the series was let down by "uneven execution, abrupt ending, and the palling mid-portions."

== See also ==
- List of Amazon India originals
- List of Amazon Prime Video original programming
