= Saajan Ka Ghar =

- Directed by: Surendra Kumar Bohra
- Written by: Aadesh K. Arjun
- Screenplay by: Dhirendra Bohra
- Story by: Keshav Rathod
- Produced by: Nutan; Surendra Bohra; Farooq
- Starring: Rishi Kapoor; Juhi Chawla; Johny Lever
- Cinematography: Thomas A. Xavier
- Edited by: Hussain Burmawala
- Music by: Songs: Nadeem-Shravan, Score: Shyam-Surender
- Production company: Roopvati Productions
- Release date: 29 April 1994
- Country: India
- Language: Hindi

Saajan Ka Ghar is a 1994 Indian Bollywood film directed by Surendra Kumar Bohra. It stars Juhi Chawla and Rishi Kapoor in pivotal roles. The whole film revolves around Juhi's character. Juhi has once again proved her acting talent in the film. The song Sawan Aaye Badal Chaaye and Babul De Do Duaa were the most popular songs of the movie. The movie is a remake of the 1983 Gujarati movie Mahiyar Ni Chundadi. The film was declared a semi-hit at the box office.

== Plot ==
Dhanraj (Anupam Kher) is a poor but greedy man whose wife dies giving birth to their daughter, Laxmi (Juhi Chawla). Dhanraj hates his daughter as he blames her for his wife's death. Just as Laxmi is born, Dhanraj wins a huge lottery and becomes extremely rich. Laxmi is raised by her aunt as Dhanraj refuses to look even at her face. He remarries and has a son, Suraj (Deepak Tijori). After Laxmi's aunt dies, she moves into her father's house. Although Laxmi is treated very poorly by her father and step-mother, she is very close to her half-brother Suraj. Her father and stepmother believe that Laxmi brings bad luck for them while Suraj disagrees and tries to save his sister from their cruelty as much as he can. In spite of his mother's orders to stay away from Laxmi, he goes to his sister to get a rakhi on the day of Raksha Bandhan. He later meets with an accident, and one of his arms is amputated. His mother blames Laxmi for his condition and beats her up. Laxmi's father and stepmother arrange her marriage with Amar (Rishi Kapoor), an army officer.

Dhanraj dies in an accident soon after Laxmi's wedding. His wife and son lose their property and are forced to move out of their bungalow. In the meantime, Laxmi, who literally cannot get a break, has a miscarriage. The doctor tells Amar that Laxmi will die if she gets pregnant again and carries that pregnancy to term. Amar decides not to tell anyone about this, including Laxmi, so as to spare her the grief. However, Amar's mother starts plotting Laxmi's murder when she doesn't conceive even after recovering from the miscarriage. She decides that Laxmi probably cannot have children anymore and chooses the most obvious course of action: murder. But before she can carry out her plan, Laxmi overhears Amar talking about the miscarriage and its effect. She decides to have a child even if it kills her. She taunts Amar, and the latter is so provoked that he forgets that his wife will die if she gets pregnant. He spends the night with her but later, he is horrified at what he has done.

However, instead of consulting a doctor or convincing her to get an abortion, he goes off to duty. While he is away, Amar's mother slaps and throws Laxmi out of the house. Laxmi starts working around in the village and sleeps in a barn. She gives birth to a baby boy by herself and takes him to her mother-in-law. Amar comes home just in time to see Laxmi breathe her last. Dhanraj, who is revealed to be alive, comes to see his daughter for the last time and apologizes to her. The film ends with Laxmi's family gathering around her pyre wishing that they had treated her better.

== Cast ==
- Juhi Chawla as Laxmi Khanna
- Rishi Kapoor as Amar Khanna
- Deepak Tijori as Suraj
- Farheen as Kiran
- Anupam Kher as Dhanraj
- Kader Khan as Uncle
- Mohnish Bahl as Vicky
- Bindu as Mrs. Dhanraj
- Shubha Khote as Kamla Khanna
- Alok Nathas Ram Khanna
- Johnny Leveras Dilip Bose / Champa Bose
- Anjana Mumtaz as Geeta
- Beena Banerjee as Shanti
- Tej Sapru as Teja
- Neelu Vaghela

== Soundtrack ==
The music of the film was composed by Nadeem-Shravan and the lyrics were penned by Sameer.

Song	Singer
"Saawan Aaya Baadal Chaaye"	Kumar Sanu, Sadhana Sargam
"Nazar Jidhar Jidhar Jaaye"	Kumar Sanu, Alka Yagnik
"Dard Sahenge Kuch Na Kahenge"	Manhar Udhas, Sadhana Sargam
"Apni Bhi Zindagi Mein"	Kumar Sanu, Alka Yagnik
"Babul De Do Dua"	Suresh Wadkar, Alka Yagnik
"Bojh Se Ghamon Ke"	Alka Yagnik
"Chandi Ki Dori"	Alka Yagnik
"Main Karti Hoon Tujhe Pyar"	Kumar Sanu, Alka Yagnik
"Rab Ne Bhi Mujh Pe Sitam"	Alka Yagnik
