= Shut Up Sona =

- Directed by: Deepti Gupta
- Produced by: Sona Mohapatra
- Release date: 21 October 2019 (MAMI)
- Running time: 63 minutes
- Country: India
- Languages: English; Hindi

Shut Up Sona is a 2019 documentary film which is made on Bollywood playback singer Sona Mohapatra's life. The movie reflects Mohapatra's unrelenting fight for an equal space in modern-day India. It was directed by Deepti Gupta in her directorial debut. Shut Up Sona won National Film Award for best editing.
