= VicScreen =

Media agency in Victoria, Australia

Agency overview
- Formed: 1981; 45 years ago
- Jurisdiction: Victoria State Government
- Headquarters: Melbourne, Australia
- Agency executive: Caroline Pitcher, CEO
- Parent department: Department of Jobs, Precincts and Regions
- Website: vicscreen.vic.gov.au

VicScreen, formerly known as Film Victoria, is the Victoria State Government's creative and economic screen development agency. It supports screen industry professionals, infrastructure, projects and events, promoting the state of Victoria as a filmmaking hub.

== History ==
Film Victoria was created as "a new statutory authority to be responsible for government activities related to the production and distribution of film in Victoria including film for educational purposes", under an act of the Victorian Parliament introduced by Norman Lacy, Minister for the Arts, on 6 October 1981, known as the Film Victoria Act 1981 (No. 9716).

The act provided for Film Victoria to be established by the amalgamation of the Victorian Film Corporation (as it had been constituted initially by the Victorian Film Corporation Act 1976), the State Film Centre, and sections of the Audio Visual Resources Branch of the Department of Education. The purpose of the amalgamation was to avoid the unnecessary duplication of functions by the three organisations; to enhance the capacity of the government to meet the present and future media needs of Victorians; and to simplify access to film materials and to enlarge the benefits to be derived from the use of such materials.

In 1997 the functions of Film Victoria were amalgamated with those of the State Film Centre, to form Cinemedia Corporation, under the Cinemedia Corporation Act 1997 (No. 2 of 1997). In 2001 the Cinemedia Corporation was abolished and Film Victoria and the Australian Centre for the Moving Image (ACMI) were established as separate statutory authorities.

In 2017, the Victorian Government's screen agency appointed Caroline Pitcher as its new chief executive officer (CEO).

VicScreen's 2020/2021 Annual Report reported support for 114 projects across film, television, and video games projects, A$391.4m amount spent in Victoria by projects that commenced production.

In 2021, VicScreen and the Victorian Government announced Victoria's "Screen Industry Strategy 2021-2025", known as the VicScreen Strategy. The strategy was the Victorian Government's first screen strategy in more than 10 years.

Early in 2022, Film Victoria rebranded as VicScreen.

=== Timeline ===
The following timeline is published on VicScreen's website:

- 1976: Established as the Victorian Film Corporation by the Victorian Film Corporation Act 1976.
- 1982: Became Film Victoria through the creation of the Film Victoria Act 1981.
- 1997: Integrated with the State Film Centre of Victoria, to form Cinemedia Corporation, under the Cinemedia Corporation Act 1997.
- 2001: Film Act 2001 abolished Cinemedia Corporation and established Film Victoria and the Australian Centre for the Moving Image (ACMI) as separate statutory authorities
- 2015: Film Victoria integrated with Creative Victoria, along with other government agencies across arts and culture, screen and design
- 2021: Launch of "Victoria's Screen Industry Strategy 2021-2025", a whole of Victorian Government plan to reshape and expand Victoria's screen industry
- 2022: Film Victoria re-branded to VicScreen, better reflecting the diversity of screen activity the agency supports, from film, television, online, VR and digital games

== Description ==
VicScreen provides services and invests in production and content development, including industry placements, filming incentives, and training.

== Awards ==
=== Screen Leader Awards ===
In 2012, Film Victoria established the Screen Leader Awards, "to recognise screen professionals who've shown leadership through their achievements and a commitment to further developing the industry and nurturing talent". These comprised two awards:

- Jill Robb Award for Outstanding Leadership, Achievement and Service to the Victorian Screen Industry, honouring Jill Robb, which in its inaugural year was won by producer Sue Maslin, and the following year by film editor Jill Bilcock. Other recipients of the Jill Robb Award have been Nadia Tass, Sonya Pemberton, Fiona Eagger, Deb Cox, Mitu Bhowmick Lange, and Claire Dobbin.
- John Howie Award for Outstanding Leadership, Achievement and Service to the Victorian Screen Industry, which in 2013 was awarded to sound engineer Roger Savage

Other awards have been added over the years, and include:

- Jan Sardi Award, honouring screenwriter Jan Sardi, for achievements in screenwriting
- Fred Schepisi Award, honouring director Fred Schepisi, for achievement in directing

== See also ==
- Screen Australia
- South Australian Film Corporation
- Screen NSW
- Screen Queensland Studios, the production facility of Screen Queensland
