= Jhankaar Beats =

2003 Indian film by Sujoy Ghosh

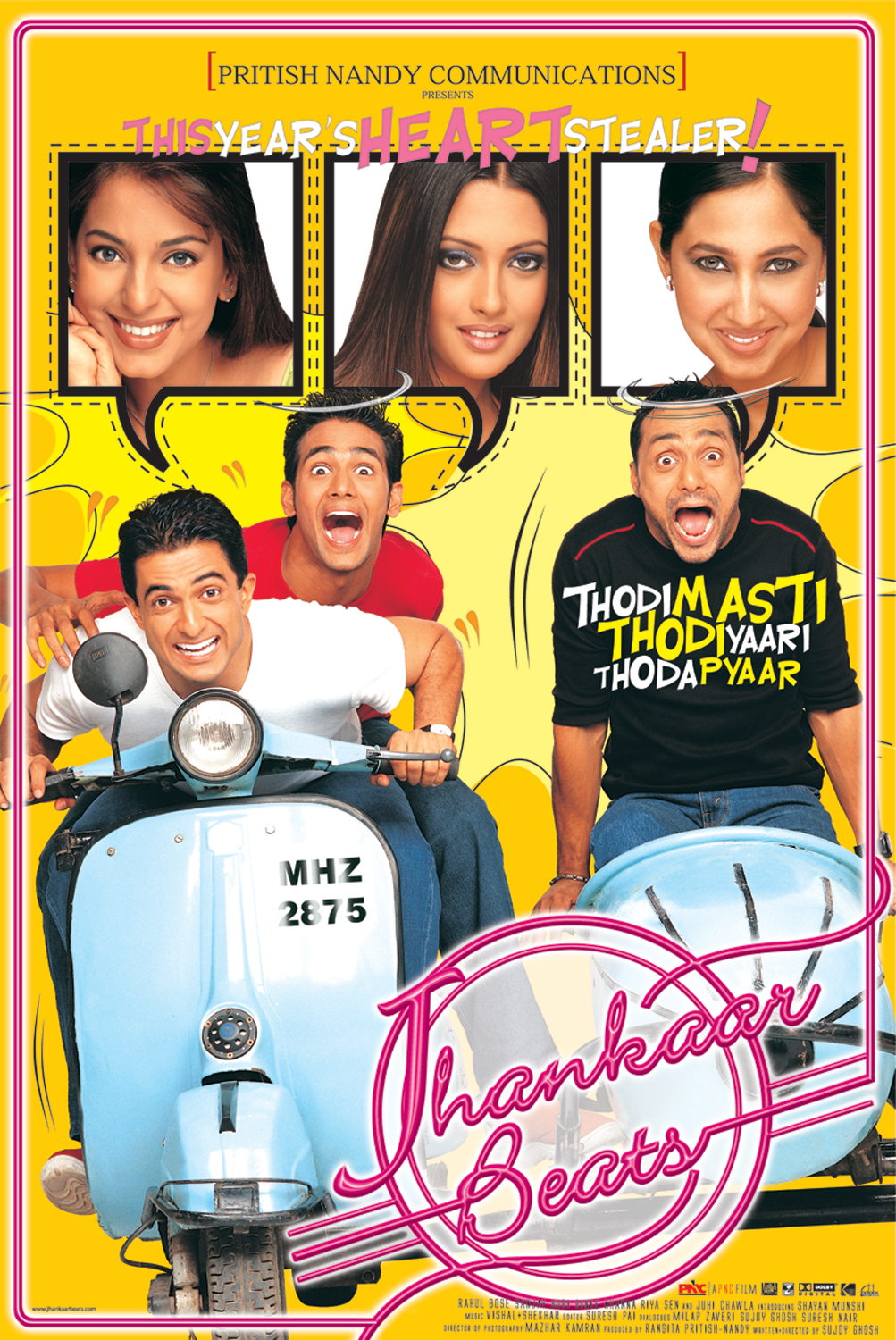
- Theatrical release poster
- Directed by: Sujoy Ghosh
- Written by: Sujoy Ghosh
- Dialogues by: Milap Zaveri; Suresh Nair
- Produced by: Pritish Nandy; Rangita Pritish Nandy; Bobbie Ghosh
- Starring: Sanjay Suri; Rahul Bose; Shayan Munshi; Juhi Chawla; Rinke Khanna; Riya Sen
- Cinematography: Mazhar Kamran
- Edited by: Suresh Pai
- Music by: Vishal–Shekhar
- Production company: Pritish Nandy Communications
- Distributed by: 20th Century Fox
- Release date: 20 June 2003
- Running time: 143 minutes
- Country: India
- Language: Hindi

Jhankaar Beats is a 2003 Indian Hindi-language musical comedy film written and directed by Sujoy Ghosh in his directorial debut and produced by Pritish Nandy Communications. It stars Sanjay Suri, Rahul Bose, debutant Shayan Munshi, Juhi Chawla, Rinke Khanna, and Riya Sen. This film pays tribute to the music of R. D. Burman.

== Plot ==
Deep is happily married to Shanti, with a little daughter, Muskaan, and another baby on the way. Rishi is his best friend and colleague at an advertising agency. Rishi is a little immature and stubborn, and this keeps on causing fights at home with his equally headstrong lawyer wife, Nicki. Rishi and Deep are dedicated musicians, obsessive about the music of R.D. Burman. They play at a club sometimes and compete in an annual pop music contest called "Jhankaar Beats," which they have lost for the past two years.

Rishi has been kicked out of his house by Nicki, and the two are considering getting divorced. Deep's nagging mother-in-law has come for a two-month visit. The men are under pressure to get an advertising campaign ready for a new client, an oddball condom manufacturer. Around this time they meet Neel, who is the son of their boss, Mr. Kapoor, and is joining the company. Neel is an ace guitarist who has his own problems — he is attracted to a pretty girl, Preeti, but cannot muster the courage to talk to her. To make things worse, his father has decided that he is wasting his life and has given him an ultimatum: find a girl in two months or settle down with a wife his parents choose. Rishi and Deep, though they tease him mercilessly, grow very fond of Neel, and he has a sure ally in Shanti. Shanti, meanwhile, is trying to get Rishi to see sense and make up with Nicki.

Rishi and Deep, amidst hilarious situations, eventually end up making Neel talk to Preeti while also making sure they practice for the upcoming Jhankaar Beats competition. Meanwhile, Rishi gets a good offer to work outside the country but decides against it as he feels he wants to give another chance to him and Nicki.

Right before the competition, Rishi sees Nicki being comforted by her lawyer and decides that Nicki doesn't want him any more and takes up that job abroad. On the day of the competition, he is leaving for the airport, much to the anger and disappointment of Deep, who had considered Rishi a brother and is now leaving him.

On the way to the airport, the taxi plays an R.D. Burman song on the radio, and Rishi realizes he is actually leaving his family. Deep and Neel on the way to the competition are surprised by Rishi turning up, and they decide to do a cover of an R.D. Burman song for their performance, regardless of the outcome.

The film ends by showing Deep, Rishi, and Neal having won the competition finally and forming a band. Rishi eventually puts his ego aside and apologizes to Nicki. Deep becomes a father and names his son after their idol.

== Cast ==
- Sanjay Suri as Deep Khanna
- Rahul Bose as Rishi Roy
- Shayan Munshi as Indraneel "Neel" Kapoor
- Juhi Chawla as Shanti Khanna
- Rinke Khanna as Nicki Roy
- Riya Sen as Preeti Sharma
- Shashikala as Shanti's mother
- Archana Puran Singh as Ms. Voluptuous, Rival Company Manager
- Parmeet Sethi as Divorce lawyer of Nicky
- Vijayendra Ghatge as Mr. Kapoor, Neel's father; Rishi and Deep's boss
- Ikraa Khatri as Muskaan Khanna
- Raja Vaid as Vijay Dhupia
- Kurush Deboo as Mr. Deboo, Absent-minded Divorced Lawyer of Rishi

== Soundtrack ==
The soundtrack was composed by Vishal–Shekhar with the lyrics penned by Vishal Dadlani. The album was released on May 6, 2003. The soundtrack of the film features songs "Tu Aashiqui Hai", And "Suno Na" sung by playback singer KK and Shaan respectively and written by Vishal Dadlani which became popular.

#	Title	Singer(s)	Duration
1	"Boss Kaun Tha"	Amit Kumar	02:46
2	"Jo Gaya Woh Gaya"	KK	04:25
3	"Sahi Hai Re (Bonus Track)"	Udit Narayan	03:51
4	"Suno Na"	Shaan	06:31
5	"Tu Aashiqui Hai"	KK	06:10
6	"Humein Tumse Pyaar Kitna"	KK, Amit Kumar	04:23
7	"Ruk Ruk Rukna Na"	Amit Kumar	03:19
8	"Tera Muskurana"	Shaan	03:54
9	"Jab Kabhi Chand Na Ho"	KK, Mahalakshmi Iyer	04:39
10	"Theme Song"	Sudesh Bhosle	03:46

== Reception ==
Deepa Gumaste of Rediff.com stated, "The makers of Jhankaar Beats have come out with a very impressive and colourful publicity brochure full of catchy one-liners and glossy pictures. If only Ghosh had put together a film that lived up to the hype built around it." Taran Adarsh's 1.5 star review for Bollywood Hungama stated, "On the whole, JHANKAAR BEATS has a few interesting moments but not enough to register an impression. At best, the film will appeal to a select few in metros, with its business prospects looking brighter at multiplexes mainly."

Sampada Sharma in her retrospective review for The Indian Express said, "When Sujoy Ghosh made Jhankaar Beats in the year 2003, Indian cinema was still enamoured by the Dil Chahta Hai wave wherein the stories set in metropolitan cities following the urban men and women were the new ‘in’ thing. Jhankaar Beats was the result of this wave of films where Sujoy was trying to keep the essence of the olden days alive even as he looked towards the future of cinema, and tried to merge the two with the perfect tool – music."
