= My Brother...Nikhil =

My Brother… Nikhil
- Directed by: Onir
- Written by: Onir
- Produced by: Sanjay Suri; Vicky Tejwani; Onir; Raj Kaushal
- Starring: Sanjay Suri; Juhi Chawla; Victor Banerjee; Purab Kohli
- Cinematography: Arvind Kannabiran
- Edited by: Onir
- Music by: Vivek Philip
- Production company: Four Front Films
- Distributed by: Yash Raj Films
- Release date: 25 March 2005
- Running time: 120 minutes
- Country: India
- Language: Hindi
- Box office: ₹5 lakh (US$5,200)

My Brother… Nikhil is a 2005 Indian Hindi-language drama film directed by Onir, based on the life of Dominic D'Souza. The movie portrays the life of Nikhil Kapoor (played by Sanjay Suri) from 1987 to 1994 when AIDS awareness in India was considerably low. Onir, the film director, stated that the film is based on true historical facts, and the standard disclaimer about fictitious content was just a compromise with the Indian government to gain permission to make the film.

== Plot ==
This film is set in Goa between 1986 and 1994. Nikhil Kapoor (Sanjay Suri) is the state all round swimming champion. His father Navin Kapoor (Victor Banerjee) has raised his son to be a sports man, a dream that he never achieved for himself. His elder sister Anamika (Juhi Chawla) teaches in a primary school and loves him dearly. His mother Anita Rosario Kapoor (Lillete Dubey) adores him and from her he inherited his artistic side to his personality.

After Nikhil is diagnosed with HIV his life falls apart. He is removed from the swimming team and his parents throw him out of their house. One day he is arrested because he is HIV positive. He is kept in forced isolation by law as the Goa Public Health Act allowed the government to isolate HIV positive people. His parents desert him and his friends move away. The only people who stand by him are his sister Anamika, her boyfriend Sam (Gautam Kapoor) and his friend Nigel (Purab Kohli). Despite facing threats from the community, Anamika and Nigel are able to secure his release with the help of a lawyer. Nikhil is unable to find a job at first, but then becomes a music teacher. Anamika and Nigel start an AIDS assistance organization called People Positive. As Nikhil develops AIDS he is reconciled with his mother and finally his father. After Nikhil's death, his parents begin to treat Nigel like a son.

== Cast ==
- Sanjay Suri as Nikhil Kapoor
- Juhi Chawla as Anamika
- Victor Banerjee as Navin Kapoor
- Lilette Dubey as Anita Rosario Kapoor
- Purab Kohli as Nigel D'Costa
- Dipannita Sharma as Leena Gomes
- Shayan Munshi as Kelly Menzes
- Gautam Kapoor as Sam Fernandes
- Peeya Rai Chowdhary as Catherine

== Soundtrack ==
Track #	Song	Singer(s)
1	Aa Bhi Ja Aa Bhi Ja	Lucky Ali, Sunidhi Chauhan
2	I Miss My Little Boy	
3	Kabhi	Josh
4	Le Chale 1	Shaan
5	Le Chale 2	KK
6	Le Chale 3	Sunidhi Chauhan
7	Mahiya	Sunidhi Chauhan
8	Leaving Home	
9	Mere Sapne	Kavita Krishnamurthy
10	Till We Meet Again	Vivek Philip
11	Woh Kaun Hai	Sunidhi Chauhan
