= Onir =

Indian film director (born 1969)

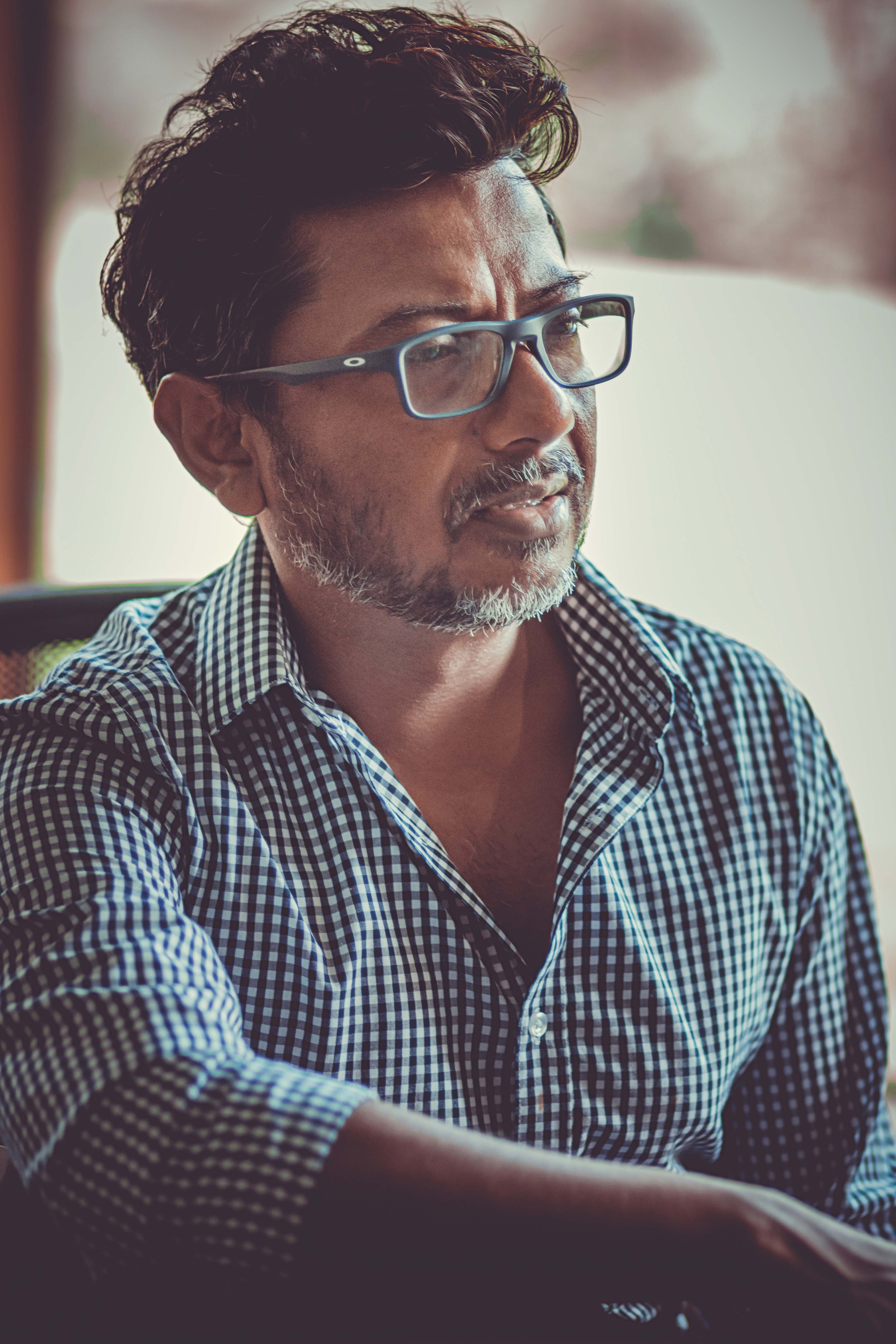
- Born: Anirban Dhar; 1 May 1969 (age 57); Samchi, Bhutan
- Occupations: Film director; film producer; film editor; screenwriter
- Years active: 2005–present

Onir (born Anirban Dhar, 1 May 1969) is an Indian film and television director, editor, screenwriter and producer. He is best known for his film My Brother…Nikhil, based on the life of Dominic d'Souza, and one of the first mainstream Hindi films to deal with AIDS and same-sex relationships in India.

Onir won the National Award for his film I Am. He has won 16 film awards in total.

== Life and career ==
=== Early life ===
Onir was born as Anirban Dhar in Samchi, Bhutan. His father Aparesh Dhar and mother Manjushree are of Bengali origin. Onir spent much of his childhood going to the cinema. The family moved to Kolkata around 1990.

In Kolkata, Onir studied comparative literature and took a few film classes at Chitrabani film school. He graduated from Jadavpur University in 1989, after which he received a scholarship to study film editing at SFB/TTC in Berlin. He later returned to India and worked as an editor, scriptwriter, art director, music album producer and director before becoming an independent producer and director.

=== Early career ===
In 1992 Onir directed and produced his first documentary film, Fallen Hero, based on painter Bijan Choudhury's life. He also served as an assistant to Kalpana Lajmi on Daman: A Victim of Marital Violence (2001), which was his first experience directing a full-length feature film.

While working on a documentary about Dominic D'Souza, a champion swimmer and AIDS patient in Goa, Onir conceived the idea for his first film. His directorial debut My Brother... Nikhil (2005) dealt with the Goan government's harsh treatment of AIDS patients in the 1980s and the stigma attached to them. My Brother... Nikhil was screened at several international film festivals, and Juhi Chawla received an IIFA nomination for her role as the main character's supportive sister. The film was screened at over 40 international film festivals, and won the Audience Choice Awards in Milan, LGBT film festival, Best Film & Jury Audience Choice Award at Montreal, image+nation Film Festival amongst others.

In 2006 he released his second film Bas Ek Pal. He received a nomination for the Best Director Critic's Award at the Global Indian Film Awards for the film. This film was not a financial success, only collecting 15–20 percent of its budget at the box office. His next film Sorry Bhai! also failed to do well, as it was released the week of the terrorist attacks in Mumbai.

=== Critical acclaim ===
Onir's eighth film was I Am, which consists of four short films exploring themes of single motherhood, displacement, child abuse and same-sex relationships. I Am won the National Award in two categories; Best Film and Best Lyrics. It was also the winnerof I-VIEW 2010s Engendered Award (New York) for Outstanding Contribution.

Onir was awarded the 2008/9 Triangle Media Group Honorary Award on 7 February 2010, and won Best Film awards at both the London Asian Film Festival and the River to River. Florence Indian Film Festival. He won Best Director for Social Concern at the IRDS Film Awards.

Onir produced "Chauranga" (Four Colours) which won the Incredible India Award as the best script at the Goa Film Bazaar, International Film Festival of India, won best film India Gold at MAMI and IFFLA. This film is about a class conflict set in rural India and directed by Debutant Director Bikas Mishra. The script was also a part of Berlin Talent Campus 2010.

The feature-length documentary "Raising the Bar", an Indi-Australian documentary featuring the lives of 6 children and young people living with down syndrome premiered at the Melbourne Indian Film Festival in 2016.

"SHAB" (The night) directed by Onir released in 2017. The film premiered at New York Indian Film Festival, screened at Melbourne Indian Film Festival, Sydney Indian Film Festival, Florence River to River Indian Film Festival and Stuttgart India Film Festival.

His 6th feature film as director "Kuchh Bheege Alfaaz" (Rain-soaked words) was released in Feb 2018. The film had its Festival premiere at the London South Asian Film Festival in March 2018. The film is currently streaming on Netflix.

In 2018, he made a short documentary, 'Widows of Vrindavan', about unwanted mothers who try and seek solace in pursuit of divine love. The documentary portrays the lives of widows living at Maitri Ghar (House), their journey to Vrindavan, their childhood, their crushed dreams and what keeps them alive now. Widows of Vrindavan is a film about these widows trying to find dignity and hope as they await death. The documentary premiered at the Indisches Film festival Stuttgart in 2019. It received the Best Documentary (Audience choice award) at the 9th Jagran Film Festival.

In 2018 he received Likho Award (Trailblazer Award) Onir has received the Diversity Award from Film Victoria Australia and La Trobe University at the Indian Film Festival of Melbourne 2019.

Onir received the Engendered Spirit of Independent Cinema Award 2020 at the Engendered Human Rights Film Festival in Delhi. Onir directed the Indo-Italian documentary film on contemporary art, SAMA: Symbols and Gestures in Contemporary Art of Italy and India (2021) which underlines the artistic parallels between India and Italy.

Onir's memoir; "I Am Onir and I Am Gay" which he has co-written with his sister Irene Dhar Malik was published by Penguin Viking in 2022. In August Onir's semi-autobiographical film "Pine Cone" premiered at 'The KASHISH Mumbai International Queer Film Festival where he won the 'Rainbow Warrior Award' for his film "Pine Cone". In August, 2023, "Pine Cone" had its Australian premiere at the 'Indian Film Festival Of Melbourne' where it won the 'Rainbow Stories Award'. Consecutively it was also screened at the 'Samabhav Travelling International film Festival' in Bhutan where Onir won the 'Trailblazing Award'.

He is also working on a SonyLiv web series on Pulwama Attack based on Rahul Pandita's book.

Onir is also working on a sequel to his 2011 National Award winning film "I Am", titled "We Are". - IMDb Mini Biography By: Onir

== Personal life ==
Onir has one younger brother, Abhishek Dhar, who is a theoretical physicist at the International Centre for Theoretical Sciences, TIFR Bangalore, adjunct faculty at Raman Research Institute and winner of the Shanti Swarup Bhatnagar Prize for Science and Technology. Onir's sister Irene Dhar Malik is a film and television editor.

Onir is an atheist. He can speak Bengali, Russian, German and Tamil. His favourite film directors are Ritwik Ghatak, Satyajit Ray, Luis Buñuel and Andrei Tarkovsky while he cites Shyam Benegal's Junoon as the reason he became a filmmaker. He is also one of the few openly gay directors in Bollywood.

== Filmography ==
Year	Film	Director	Producer	Writer	Editor	Notes
2001	Rahul				Yes	
2001	Daman: A Victim of Marital Violence				Yes	
2003	Fun 2shh: Dudes In the 10th Century				Yes	
2005	My Brother ... Nikhil	Yes	Yes	Yes	Yes	
2006	Bas Ek Pal	Yes		Yes		
2008	Sorry Bhai!	Yes	Yes			
2011	I Am	Yes	Yes	Yes	Yes	National Award for Best Hindi Feature Film
2015	Chauranga		Yes			
2016	Raising the Bar	Yes	Yes			Documentary
2017	Shab	Yes	Yes	Yes	Yes	
2018	Kuchh Bheege Alfaaz	Yes				
2024	My Melbourne	Yes				Anthology film
2024	We are Faheem & Karun	Yes	Yes			Feature film based on a true story

== Awards and nominations ==
Year	Film	Award	Category	Result
2005	My Brother…Nikhil	Montreal (Image+ Nation film festival)	Best Film (Jury)	Won
2005	My Brother…Nikhil	Montreal (Image+ Nation film festival)	Best Film (Audience)	Won
2005	My Brother…Nikhil	The Saathi Rainbow Film Awards, Kolkatta	Best Director	Won
2005	My Brother…Nikhil	TMG Global Awards	Best Director/Producer	Won
2006	My Brother…Nikhil	20th Milan International Lesbian & Gay Film Festival	Best Film (Audience)	Won
2011	I Am	National Award	Best Hindi Feature Film	Won
2011	I Am	Jagran Film Festival	Best Director	Won
2011	I Am	London Asian Film Festival	Best Film	Won
2011	I Am	IFFK 2010	NETPAC Award - Best in Asian Cinema	Won
2011	I Am	IFFK 2010	Special Mention – International Jury	Won
2011	I Am	KASHISH Mumbai International Queer Film Festival	Best Narrative Feature	Won
2011	I Am	River to River Film Festival, Florence, 2010	Best Film (Audience)	Won
2011	I Am	I-VIEW, 2010	Engendered Award for Outstanding Contribution	Won

2018 'Widows of Vrindavan - It received the Best Documentary (Audience choice award) at the 9th Jagran Film Festival.

In 2018 he received Likho Award (Trailblazer Award) Onir has received the Diversity Award from Film Victoria Australia and La Trobe University at the Indian Film Festival of Melbourne 2019.

Onir received the Engendered Spirit of Independent Cinema Award 2020 at the Engendered Human Rights Film Festival in Delhi. In August Onir's semi-autobiographical film "Pine Cone" premiered at 'The KASHISH Mumbai International Queer Film Festival where he won the 'Rainbow Warrior Award' for his film "Pine Cone".

In August, 2023, "Pine Cone" had its Australian premiere at the 'Indian Film Festival Of Melbourne' where it won the 'Rainbow Stories Award'. Consecutively it was also screened at the 'Samabhav Travelling International film Festival' in Bhutan where Onir won the 'Trailblazing Award'.
