= Deepti Sivan =

Indian film director, actress and producer

Deepti Pillay Sivan
- Occupations: Film Director; Producer; actress
- Spouse: Sanjeev Sivan
- Relatives: Sidhanshu Sivan (son), Sangeeth Sivan (brother in law), Santhosh Sivan (brother in law)

Deepti Sivan is an Indian film director, actress and producer who predominantly works in Malayalam Movie Industry.

== Career ==
=== As actress ===
Sivan has debuted as an actress in the movie Kalippattam as Mohanlal's daughter. She later acted as the heroine in the movie Moonilonnu directed by K. K. Haridas.

=== As director ===
Sivan is known for directing the documentary film Decoding Shankar about Shankar Mahadevan. The documentary features Amitabh Bachchan, Aamir Khan, Javed Akhtar, Shreya Ghoshal other than Shankar Mahadevan

Sivan has directed the Indian Navy Anthem Call Of The Blue Waters along with Sanjeev Sivan which was released by the President of India on the Navy Day and now it's viral through the official YouTube channel of the President of India.

=== As producer ===
Sivan is the producer of the movie Ozhuki Ozhuki Ozhuki directed by Sanjeev Sivan which was selected to Kolkata International Film Festival and to Moscow International Children's Film Festival, Russia.

== Awards and honours ==
=== For documentary - Decoding Shankar ===
The documentary which she directed won around 25 awards globally.

- Best Biographical Film in Toronto Women International Film Festival.
- Best Indian Film and Best Biographical Film in Cannes World Film Festival.
- Selected to Indian Panorama.

=== For feature film - Ozhuki Ozhuki Ozhuki ===
- Selected to Kolkata International Film Festival .

== Filmography ==
Year	Film	Language	Notes
1993	Kalipattam	Malayalam	As actress
1997	Moonilonnu	Malayalam	As actress
2004	Aparichithan	Malayalam	As production designer
2018	Decoding Shankar	English	As director
2022	Indian Navy Anthem - Call Of The Blue Waters	Hindi	As Director
2024	Ozhuki Ozhuki Ozhuki	Malayalam	As Producer
