= 28th National Film Awards =

Awards ceremony for Indian Cinema released in 1980

- 28th National Film Awards
- Awarded for: Best of Indian cinema in 1980
- Awarded by: Directorate of Film Festivals
- Presented by: Neelam Sanjeeva Reddy (President of India)
- Presented on: April 1981
- Official website: dff.nic.in

Highlights
- Best Feature Film: Akaler Shandhaney
- Dadasaheb Phalke Award: P. Jairaj
- Most awards: • Akaler Shandhaney • Oppol (4)

The 28th National Film Awards, presented by Directorate of Film Festivals, the organisation set up by Ministry of Information and Broadcasting, India to felicitate the best of Indian Cinema released in the year 1980. Ceremony took place in April 1981.

== Juries ==
Two different committees were formed for feature films and short films, headed by V. Shantaram and B. D. Garga respectively.

- Jury Members: Feature Films
  - V. Shantaram (Chairperson) • Basanta Choudhury • B. V. Dharap • Sunil Gangopadhyay • R. N. K. Prasad • Ravindranathan Nair • Arthur J. Pais • Purnendu Sekhar Pattrea • Jayoo Patwardhan • T. S. Ranga • Kantilal Rathod • Mriganka Sekhar Ray • Shobhna Samarth • N. Seshadri • K. B. Tilak • G. Venkateshwara Rao
- Jury Members: Short Films
  - B. D. Garga (Chairperson) • Utpal K. Banerjee • P. D. P. Rao

== Awards ==
Awards were divided into feature films and non-feature films.

=== Lifetime Achievement Award ===
Name of Award	Image	Awardee(s)	Awarded As	Awards
Dadasaheb Phalke Award		P. Jairaj	Actor and Director	Swarna Kamal, ₹40,000 and a Shawl

=== Feature films ===
Feature films were awarded at All India as well as regional level. For 28th National Film Awards, a Bengali film, Akaler Shandhaney won the National Film Award for Best Feature Film also winning the maximum number of awards (four), along with a Malayalam film, Oppol. Following were the awards given in each category:

==== All India Award ====
Following were the awards given:

Name of Award	Name of Film	Language	Awardee(s)	Cash prize
Best Feature Film	Akaler Shandhaney	Bengali	Producer: Dhiresh Kumar Chakraborty	Swarna Kamal and ₹50,000/-
Best Feature Film	Akaler Shandhaney	Bengali	Director: Mrinal Sen	Swarna Kamal and ₹25,000/-
Best Feature Film	Citation: For brilliantly recreating the tragedy of the 1943 Bengal famine and focussing on the disturbing continuity of the conditions which created it, for the cinematic excellence of the film which explores human experience at the different levels and for the consummate artistry with which the complexity of the social-economic situation is fused into a poignant statement.			
Second Best Feature Film	Oppol	Malayalam	Producer: Rosamma George	Rajat Kamal and ₹30,000/-
Second Best Feature Film	Oppol	Malayalam	Director: K. S. Sethumadhavan	Rajat Kamal and ₹15,000/-
Second Best Feature Film	Citation: For boldly presenting a woman's love for her illegitimate child, for sensitive handling of complex situations, and for offering social acceptability to the mother and child, thereby giving a new perspective to the values prevalent body.			
Best Feature Film on National Integration	Bhavni Bhavai	Gujarati	Producer: Sanchar Film Cooperative Society Ltd.	Rajat Kamal and ₹30,000/-
Best Feature Film on National Integration	Bhavni Bhavai	Gujarati	Director: Ketan Mehta	Rajat Kamal and ₹15,000/-
Best Feature Film on National Integration	Citation: For tracing the history of social evil of untouchability through popular folk drama form, for synthesising diverse performing arts into socially relevant communication, for depicting the untouchable's fight for their rights.			
Best Debut Film of a Director	Maina Tadanta	Bengali	Utpalendu Chakrabarty	Rajat Kamal and ₹10,000/-
Best Debut Film of a Director	Citation: For depicting with realistic vigor the exploitation perpetrated on the tribal and the landless, for portraying the spirited fight of the downtrodden and for showing great maturity in the conception and presentation of the theme in this maiden venture.			
Best Direction	Akaler Shandhaney	Bengali	Mrinal Sen	Rajat Kamal and ₹20,000/-
Best Direction	Citation: For exploring the inevitable conflict between urban and rural cultures, for displaying in almost every sequence masterly handling and complete command over the medium.			
Best Screenplay	Akaler Shandhaney	Bengali	Mrinal Sen	Rajat Kamal and ₹10,000/-
Best Screenplay	Citation: For effectively combining the terse and pithy dialogue with creation of well-defined, lively characters to convey a poignant story which leaves a lasting impression.			
Best Actor	Oppol	Malayalam	Balan K. Nair	Rajat Kamal and ₹10,000/-
Best Actor	Citation: For extremely virile and sensitive portrayal of a man who is constantly puzzled by the behaviour of his wife, for conveying the flashes of anger and frustration he suffers and depicting ultimate acceptance of his wife's past with mellowed tenderness which reveals the virtuosity of a great artist.			
Best Actress	Chakra	Hindi	Smita Patil	Rajat Kamal and ₹10,000/-
Best Actress	Citation: For a steering role as a middle-aged woman from the slums of Bombay, for depicting her stoic acceptance of an unkind fate and at the same time continuing to dream of a better future, which never arrives, with profound expressiveness and brilliant dialogue delivery.			
Best Child Artist	Oppol	Malayalam	Aravind	Rajat Kamal and ₹5,000/-
Best Child Artist	Citation: For portraying the complex role of a lonely child who is a victim of social ostracisation for no fault of his own, for bringing out the terrible emotional trauma with little dialogue and a superb economy of gesture.			
Best Cinematography (Color)	Nenjathai Killathe	Tamil	Ashok Kumar	Rajat Kamal and ₹10,000/-
Best Cinematography (Color)	Citation: For brilliantly creating salient features of each character with the help of superb camera control and effective use of lighting and for significantly contributing to the mood of the film.			
Best Cinematography (Black and White)	Yagam	Malayalam	Sivan	Rajat Kamal and ₹5,000/-
Best Cinematography (Black and White)	Citation: For depicting the grim and tense mood of the film, admirably depicting mellowed moments in the film with charm.			
Best Audiography	Nenjathai Killathe	Tamil	S. P. Ramanathan	Rajat Kamal and ₹7,500/-
Best Audiography	Citation: For a highly sensitive use of sound to capture perfectly the rhythm and mood of each sequence.			
Best Editing	Akaler Shandhaney	Bengali	Gangadhar Naskar	Rajat Kamal and ₹7,500/-
Best Editing	Citation: For a sensitive use of images, for gradually building up the tempo of the film in a well-knit pattern; for never permitting a slackening of pace and for underlining the whole film with a subdued sense of drama.			
Best Art Direction	Bhavni Bhavai	Gujarati	Meera Lakhia	Rajat Kamal and ₹7,500/-
Best Art Direction	Citation: For perfectly creating the glamour of the royal palace juxtaposed with the grim austerity of hutments, for successfully providing a period touch down to the smallest details, for providing a stamp of authenticity to the film.			
Best Music Direction	Hirak Rajar Deshe	Bengali	Satyajit Ray	Rajat Kamal and ₹10,000/-
Best Music Direction	Citation: For brilliant experimentation with different forms and modes of Indian music and for creating a mood of fantasy in a pleasing and harmonious style.			
Best Male Playback Singer	Hirak Rajar Deshe	Bengali	Anup Ghoshal	Rajat Kamal and ₹10,000/-
Best Male Playback Singer	Citation: For a wonderful range of voice and the sense of rhythm imparted to the songs rendered, by him.			
Best Female Playback Singer	Oppol ("Ettumanoor Ambalathil Ezhunnallathu")	Malayalam	S. Janaki	Rajat Kamal and ₹10,000/-
Best Female Playback Singer	Citation: For the serenity and pathos with which each rendering is imbued and for adding a new dimension to the theme of the film.			

==== Regional Award ====
The awards were given to the best films made in the regional languages of India. For feature films in English, Gujarati, Kannada, Kashmiri, Meitei, Marathi and Oriya language, award for Best Feature Film was not given.

Name of Award	Name of Film	Awardee(s)	Awards
Best Feature Film in Assamese	Anirban	Producer: Preeti Saikia	Rajat Kamal and ₹15,000/-
Best Feature Film in Assamese	Anirban	Director: Bhabendra Nath Saikia	Rajat Kamal and ₹7,500/-
Best Feature Film in Assamese	Citation: For depicting man's attachment to life through the story of an unfortunate married couple, through severe agony and funeral pyres, for providing a touch of realism by a delicate representation of a piece of lower middle class existence.		
Best Feature Film in Bengali	Hirak Rajar Deshe	Producer: Information and Cultural Affairs Department, Government of West Bengal	Rajat Kamal and ₹15,000/-
Best Feature Film in Bengali	Hirak Rajar Deshe	Director: Satyajit Ray	Rajat Kamal and ₹7,500/-
Best Feature Film in Bengali	Citation: For an allegorical representation of the victory of good over evil, embellished by superb acting and haunting music.		
Best Feature Film in Hindi	Aakrosh	Producer: Devi Dutt	Rajat Kamal and ₹15,000/-
Best Feature Film in Hindi	Aakrosh	Director: Govind Nihalani	Rajat Kamal and ₹7,500/-
Best Feature Film in Hindi	Citation: For its severe indictment of an establishment and a society that permits injustice, for presenting a bold theme in a cinematic style which makes it both socially and aesthetically significant.		
Best Feature Film in Malayalam	Yagam	Producer: B. Chandramani Bai	Rajat Kamal and ₹15,000/-
Best Feature Film in Malayalam	Yagam	Director: Sivan	Rajat Kamal and ₹7,500/-
Best Feature Film in Malayalam	Citation: For presenting dilemma of romantic revolutionary who understands the futility of his misadventure at the cost of some rare moments of happiness, for successfully building up the sense of impending doom underlining the human relationships throughout the film.		
Best Feature Film in Punjabi	Chann Pardesi	Producer: Swarn Sedha, Baldev Gill And J. S. Cheema	Rajat Kamal and ₹15,000/-
Best Feature Film in Punjabi	Chann Pardesi	Director: Chitrartha Singh	Rajat Kamal and ₹7,500/-
Best Feature Film in Punjabi	Citation: For presenting a story of human passion in cinematic terms, representing a departure from the usual trends prevalent in Punjabi cinema.		
Best Feature Film in Tamil	Nenjathai Killathe	Producer: K. Rajgopal Chetty	Rajat Kamal and ₹15,000/-
Best Feature Film in Tamil	Nenjathai Killathe	Director: Mahendran	Rajat Kamal and ₹7,500/-
Best Feature Film in Tamil	Citation: For artistically portraying the gradual development of a girl from adolescence to womanhood, for depicting in a gentle moving narrative her emotional suffering and how she overcomes them.		
Best Feature Film in Telugu	Harischandrudu	Producer: U. D. Murali Krishna	Rajat Kamal and ₹15,000/-
Best Feature Film in Telugu	Harischandrudu	Director: U. Visweswar Rao	Rajat Kamal and ₹7,500/-
Best Feature Film in Telugu	Citation: For an exposure of the manoeuvrings and misdeeds of politicians and for contributing significantly to the development of political cinema in India.		

=== Non-Feature films ===
Following were the awards given:

Name of Award	Name of Film	Language	Awardee(s)	Cash prize
Best Information Film	Daldal	Hindi	Producer: Krystyna Khote; Director: Pradeep Dixit	Rajat Kamal and ₹5,000/- Each
Best Information Film	Citation: For powerful indictment of a social malaise-bonded labour-very sensitively handled and well researched.			
Best Educational / Instructional Film	Mariculture	English	Producer: Films Division; Director: C. J. Paulose	Rajat Kamal and ₹5,000/- Each
Best Educational / Instructional Film	Citation: For diligent research and meticulous execution.			
Best Promotional Film	Oil Offshore	English	Producer: Prem Prakash; Director: Satya Prakash	Rajat Kamal and ₹5,000/- Each
Best Promotional Film	Citation: For visual excitement and controlled handling of a difficult subject.			
Best Experimental Film	Arrival	English	Producer: Films Division; Director: Mani Kaul	Rajat Kamal and ₹5,000/- Each
Best Experimental Film	Citation: For searing imagery and outstanding soundtrack.			
Best Newsreel Cameraman	Tragedy of Gendi (Indian News Review No. 1657)	English	Mahesh Pratap Sinha and Rajgopal Rao	Rajat Kamal and ₹5,000/-
Best Newsreel Cameraman	Citation: For displaying a keen news sense.			
Best News Review	News Magazine No. 3 (Day of the Dark Sun)	English	Films Division	Rajat Kamal and ₹5,000/-
Best News Review	Citation: For capturing the high drama of an historic event - the total solar eclipse.			
Special Mention	The Chola Heritage	English	Producer and Director: Adoor Gopalakrishnan	Certificate only
Special Mention	Citation: For its outstanding photography of the Chola sculpture.			Certificate only
Special Mention	Pampa	English	Producer: Films Division; Director: P. C. Sharma	Certificate only
Special Mention	Citation: For its sensitive handling of a purposeful theme, encouraging initiative as a child.			Certificate only

=== Awards not given ===
Following were the awards not given as no film was found to be suitable for the award:

- Best Children's Film
- Best Film on Family Welfare
- Best Lyrics
- Best Popular Film Providing Wholesome Entertainment
- Best Film on Social Documentation
- Best Animation Film
- Best Feature Film in English
- Best Feature Film in Kannada
- Best Feature Film in Manipuri
- Best Feature Film in Marathi
- Best Feature Film in Oriya
