= P. Shwetha =

Indian actress

Shweta Padmanaban
- Born: Chennai, India
- Other names: P.Shwetha, Swetha P, Shweta Padmanaban
- Education: Anna University, Chennai, India Georgetown University, Washington DC, USA
- Occupation: Actress
- Years active: 1995—Present
- Known for: Two-time National award winner for Best Child actor (1999 and 2002) for Tamil Films Malli & Kutty.
- Spouse: Rishi Narayan

Shweta Padmanaban, also known as P.Shwetha, is an Indian actor best known for her performances in lead roles in Tamil Cinema, including Malli (1998), Kutty (2002), Navarasa (2005). She has also acted in Manam Virumbuthe Unnai, Aaytha Ezhuthu and several other films in Tamil and Malayalam. She is known to be the only child actor to have won National Film Award twice for 'Best Child Actor'. She won the National Film Award for Best Child Artist in 1999 for her performance in the film. She went on to win another National Film Award for Best Child Artist in 2002 for her role in the film Kutty. She has also won as Best Child Actor in Poznan International Film Award in 1999, Hyderabad International Children Film Award in 1999 and Kerala State Telefilm Award in 2004.

== Career ==
Shweta began her film career at the age of five, when she was introduced by Director Bharathiraja debuting in a cameo role in Anthimantharai. She continued to build her career in Tamil films, Advertisements and TV series. She played a prominent role in Tamil TV series Doctors, where she played Actress Revathy's Daughter. She also acted in title role in the short series Chinna Chinna Assai, for a story 'Elakkiya' directed by Actor Vikram. She went on to play a significant role in Manam Virumbuthe Unnai as Actor Prabhu's daughter. She had a breakthrough in the critically acclaimed film Malli (1998), directed by Santosh Sivan, playing the young girl Malli, on an adventure to find a blue wishing stone to help cure her best friend's ailments. She won the National Film Award for Best Child Artist in 1999 for her performance in the film. She went on to win another National Film Award for Best Child Artist in 2002 for her role in the film Kutty where she played the role of Kannamma/Kutty. She also starred in the Santosh Sivan film Navarasa.[1] She has acted in several films revolving around social issues such as child trafficking, corporal punishment in schools, domestic violence, acceptance of LGBTQ+ community, harming environment etc. She was the Young Jury Member in Lucknow International Children's Film Festival in 2009. She completed her degrees in Engineering and Master of Science in Biostatistics in Washington DC, USA. She trained in acting in Rajiv Menon's Mindscreen Film Institute in Chennai. She is currently being represented for acting by Sharanya Spots Talent.

== Filmography ==
Year	Film	Role	Notes
1996	Anthimanthaarai	Debut	
1997	Bharathikannama	Kannamma	In Song "Chinna chinna kannamma"
1998	Malli	Malli	National Film Award for Best Child Artist
1998	Desiya Geetham		Cameo appearance in song "En Kanavinai"
1999	Manam Virumbuthe Unnai	Kavita	
2001	Kutty	Kutty	National Film Award for Best Child Artist
2003	Kaali	Lead Role	Kerala State Television Award for Best Child Artist
2004	Aaytha Ezhuthu	Jo	
2005	Navarasa	Shwetha	

== Awards ==
International Awards

International Children's Film Festival, Hyderabad, India Best Child Actor 1999 - Malli

18th International Festival of Films For Children Ale Kino, (Poznań, Poland, 15–20 May 2000)

- Poznan Goats for the Best Child - actress

National Awards

1999 National Film Award for Best Child Artist Malli

2002 National Film Award for Best Child Artist Kutty (2001 film)

Kerala State Television Award for Best Child Actor in telefilm Kaali, 2003
