= Yuddham =

Yuddham may refer to:

- Yuddham (1984 film), a Telugu-language action drama film
- Yuddham (2014 film), an Indian Telugu-language drama film
