= Malli (film) =

- Directed by: Santosh Sivan
- Written by: Santosh Sivan; Ravi Deshpande
- Produced by: Santosh Sivan
- Starring: Vanitha; P. Shwetha
- Cinematography: Santosh Sivan
- Edited by: A. Sreekar Prasad
- Music by: Aslam Mustafa
- Release date: 30 December 2000
- Running time: 90 mins
- Country: India
- Language: Tamil

Malli is a 1998 Indian Tamil-language children's film directed by Santosh Sivan. The film met with widespread critical acclaim upon release, and has been shown at many film festivals including the Toronto International Film Festival and the New York International Children's Film Festival. It won the Best Film on Environment Conservation/Preservation at the 46th National Film Awards.

The film revolves around the story of Malli (P. Shwetha), a poor girl who meets an old, local storyteller, who shares with her a story of a magical blue stone that can cure her best friend's muteness. With new horizons to pursue, she sets off to find this mysterious blue wishing stone.

== Plot ==
Malli, a ten-year-old girl, tries her best to help her poor parents by collecting firewood. In between; she spies on the village veterinarian, who constantly converses with his patients from the animal world. Malli actually hero worships him; and even tries to imitate him secretly She has just two personal dreams: to own a new dress for the festival; and to get the blue bead, which can cure her friend's inborn deficiency. Old Monu, the village storyteller had in her tale of "The Good Spirit". Monu habitually conceives purely imaginary heroic tales which impress Malli very deeply. In that story, Monu illustrated how a ‘Good Spirit’ once had given Monu a blue bead as a gift. Malli bribes Monu with some honey. In return Monu recites to nonsensical, meaningless rhyme for inviting the Spirit. One back night, Malli tries to invite the Spirit with the rhyme, in vain. On the festival Malli is thrilled with her new yellow dress her way back from the woods, she rescues a fawn shot down by a poacher. After a long, hazardous journey through thick woods she reaches the Vet's house late at night and waits through the night while he treats the injured fawn. In the morning she begins her long trek back home with the new pet. At the riverside, finding the fawn's happy reaction to its bird community, Malli sets it free. Her despair is further compounded to find her new dress tattered beyond repair, when suddenly a bright object in the sand catches her eye – it's the blue bead!

== Cast ==
- Vanitha as Cukoo
- P. Shwetha as Malli
- Janagaraj as the veterinarian
- Manoj Pillai as a forest officer
- Vishnu Vardhan as Sundaram

== Production ==
The film was made in 9 days on a shoestring budget of ₹25 lakh (worth ₹2.1 crore in 2021 prices) for National Centre for Children and Young People.

== Awards ==
The film has been nominated for the following awards since its release:

2001 Independent Spirit Awards (United States)

- Nominated - Independent Spirit Award - Best Foreign Film - Malli - Santosh Sivan

2001 Political Film Society (United States)

- Nominated - PFS Award - Peace - Malli - Santosh Sivan

2001 Satellite Awards (United States)

- Nominated - Golden Satellite Award - Best Motion Picture (Foreign Language) - Malli - Santosh Sivan

1999 Chicago International Children's Film Festival (United States)

- Nominated - Adult Jury Award - 2nd Place - Malli - Santosh Sivan

The film has won the following awards since its release:

1998 Cairo International Film Festival (Egypt)

- Won - Golden Pyramid - Best Film - Malli - Santosh Sivan
- Won - Best Director - Santosh Sivan

2004 Los Angeles Indian Film Festival (United States)

- Won - Audience Award - Best Feature Film - Malli - Santosh Sivan

1999 National Film Awards (India)

- Won - Silver Lotus Award - Best Child Artist - P. Shwetha
- Won - Silver Lotus Award - Best Film on Environment Preservation/Conservation - Malli - Santosh Sivan

18th International Festival of Films For Children Ale Kino, (Poznań, Poland, 15–20 May 2000)

- Poznan Goats for the Best Director - Santosh Sivan.
- Poznan Goats for the Best Child - actress - Swetha
- Poznan Goats for the Music - Aslam Mustafa
- Award for the special mentions for the Marcinek distinction
