= Vyooham (1990 film) =

Malayalam film

- Poster designed by Gayathri Ashokan
- Directed by: Sangeeth Sivan
- Written by: Sab John; Sangeeth Sivan
- Starring: Raghuvaran; Sukumaran; Parvathi
- Cinematography: Santosh Sivan
- Edited by: A. Sreekar Prasad
- Music by: S. P. Venkatesh
- Release date: 1 November 1990
- Country: India
- Language: Malayalam

Vyooham is a 1990 Indian Malayalam-language action film, directed by Sangeeth Sivan, starring Raghuvaran, Sukumaran, Captain Raju, Babu Antony, Urvashi, Rajan P. Dev and Parvathy Jayaram. It was the debut directorial of Sangeeth Sivan.

The lead characters were loosely based on the characters of Mel Gibson and Danny Glover in Lethal Weapon, where Raghuvaran and Sukumaran played the lead roles respectively, while the plot is original.

Vyooham was Raghuvaran's return to Malayalam after Rugma released in 1983. It was dubbed into Tamil language as Kaaval Athikari.

== Plot ==
An undercover agent, Tony Leous was hired by Kochi police to find some drug dealers. Mohan is also a policeman as part of Narcotic control. Tony raids one of Captain Raju's facilities and recovers smuggled items. This gives a heavy blow to the smugglers. At night, Babu Antony enters Tony house and kills the pet dog. The gundas also enter Sukumaran's house and tie Sukumaran and his family, wearing a mask and telling them to be careful. Raghuvaran wants to get evidence to catch the smugglers. Urvashi, sister of Sukumaran, falls in love with Tony, who seems serious always. Finally, Rajan P. Dev, who lost his son now gets a threatening call from the smugglers to help them smuggle or else his second son also may get converted to a drug addict. Rajan P. Dev tells the whole story of his killed son as a smuggler and drug addict due to the villains. A meeting place was fixed between the villain and Rajan P. Dev. At the meeting area, Raghuvaran records the talks. But the villain finds out Raghuvaran, attacks him and also kills Rajan P. Dev. In the end, at the smuggling area, Raghuvaran finishes all the villains. The film ends with Raghuvaran going in a jeep, smiling with Urvashi.

== Cast ==
- Raghuvaran as Tony Leous
- Sukumaran as Mohan
- Captain Raju as Khalid
- Babu Antony as Hari
- Urvashi as Lakshmi
- Mohan Raj as Ajith
- Rajan P. Dev as Jayakumar
- Kanakalatha as Geetha
- Parvathy Jayaram as Tessy
- Devan as Raveendranath
- T. P. Madhavan as Settu
- Shivaji as Charlie
- Master Badusha as Vineeth
- Mahesh as Kishore
- Willy as Sub Inspector
