= K. Hari Kumar =

Indian author and screenwriter

- Harikumar Krishnamoorthy
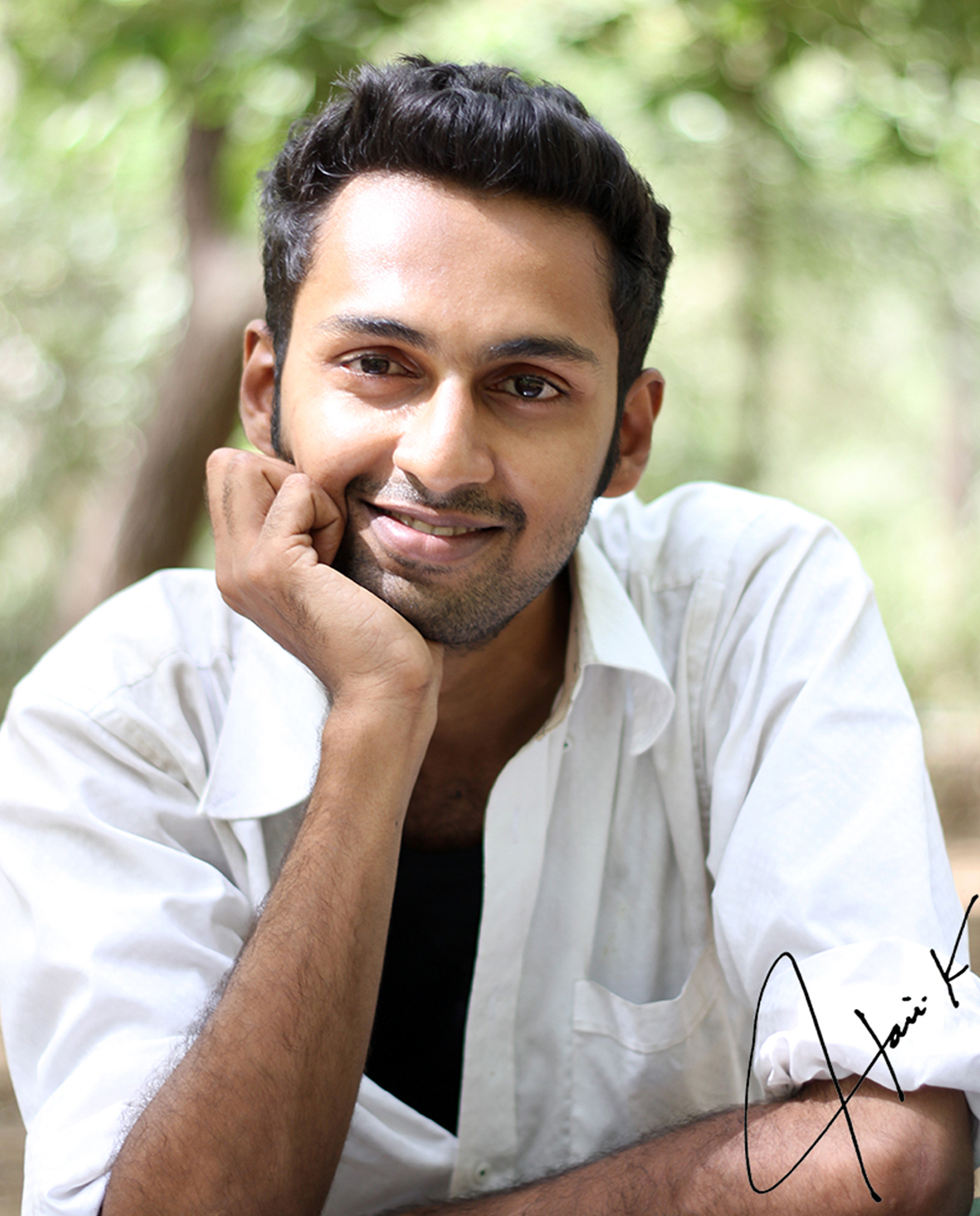
- K. Hari Kumar, Mumbai
- Born: Harikumar Krishnamoorthy; 1989 (age 36–37); Tripunithura
- Citizenship: Indian
- Education: DAV
- Occupations: Author, screenwriter
- Writing career
- Pen name: K Hari Kumar
- Language: English, Tulu, Hindi, Malayalam
- Years active: 2013–present
- Genres: Horror, folklore and mythology, psychological thriller
- Subjects: folklore, mythology, horror, psychological thriller
- Notable works: Daiva, India's Most Haunted, Bhram (web series)
- Website: theharikumar.com

Harikumar Krishnamoorthy (born 3 January 1989), better known as K. Hari Kumar, is an Indian author and screenwriter born in Cochin and brought up in Gurgaon. He did his schooling from DAV Public School. His first book When Strangers Meet was published in 2013, followed by That Frequent Visitor (2015), India's Most Haunted (2019), Daiva (2024) and Dakini (2024). He has penned the story and screenplay for E (Malayalam Movie) and the Hindi language psychological horror web-series Bhram (web series). He has been featured as one of the top horror writers of India. He has written 50 horror short stories which featured in the 2019 book called India's Most Haunted.

== Personal life ==
Harikumar Krishnamoorthy was born on 3 January 1989 in Tripunithura, Kerala, but grew up in Gurgaon, Haryana. After completing his engineering, he started making documentaries and short films with friends. In 2010, he fell ill and finished writing his first book When Strangers Meet, published in 2013 by Srishti Publishers. His second book That Frequent Visitor was published in 2015. The Other Side Of Her, is a psychological thriller published in 2018 and inspired the Hindi language web-series Bhram starring Kalki Koechlin, Sanjay Suri, Eijaz Khan, Bhumika Chawla, Omkar Kapoor, Rajendranath Zutshi and Harsh Vashisht.

Under the mentorship of filmmaker, Sangeeth Sivan, K Hari Kumar ventured into mainstream feature films with E (Malayalam Movie) which marks the comeback of actress Gautami in Malayalam cinema.

== Bibliography ==
=== Books ===
Year	Title	Publisher	ISBN	Note
2013	When Strangers Meet.	Srishti Publishers	978-9380349930	Novel
2015	That Frequent Visitor	Srishti Publishers	978-9382665304	Novel
2018	The Other Side of Her	Srishti Publishers	978-9387022416	Novel, inspired web-series Bhram
2019	India's Most Haunted	HarperCollins	978-9353573553	Collection of fifty horror short stories based on real haunted places in India
2021	Dakhma	HarperCollins	978-9354890628	Novel
2022	Asian Ghost Stories	Flame Tree Publishing	978-1839648823	Foreword only
2022	Indiayile Prethalayangal	Mathrubhumi Books	978-9390865826	Malayalam translation of India's Most Haunted
2024	Daiva - Discovering the Extraordinary World of Spirit Worship	HarperCollins	978-9354899744	A book on folklore and regional mythology of Tulunadu
2024	Dakini	HarperCollins	978-9362130143	Novel
2025	Naaga - Discovering the Extraordinary World of Serpent Worship	HarperCollins	978-9369892655	A book on Indian serpent lore and ophiolatry

== Filmography ==
=== Film ===
Year	Film	Screenplay	Story	Dialogues	Actor	Role
2017	E	Yes	Yes	No	Yes	As Mr. Menon

=== Television ===
Year	Film	Screenplay	Story	Dialogues	Actor	Role	Platform
2019	Bhram	Yes	Yes	Yes	Yes	Journalist	ZEE5

== See also ==
- List of Indian writers
