= Pillalu Diddina Kapuram =

- Movie Poster
- Directed by: Perala
- Written by: Jandhyala (dialogues)
- Screenplay by: Perala; Vemuri Satyanarayana; D. Narayana Varma
- Story by: Perala
- Produced by: Sangisetty Dasaradha; Amara Srisaila Rao
- Starring: Jagapathi Babu; Divyavani; Kinnera; Master Tarun
- Cinematography: Kabirlal
- Edited by: Murali-Ramaiah
- Music by: Vidyasagar
- Production company: Konark Movies
- Release date: 9 April 1993
- Running time: 131 mins
- Country: India
- Language: Telugu

Pillalu Diddina Kapuram (transl. Family set right by children) is a 1993 Indian Telugu-language drama film, produced by Sangisetty Dasaradha and Amara Srisaila Rao for Konark Movies and directed by Perala. It stars Jagapathi Babu, Divyavani, Kinnera, Master Tarun with music composed by Vidyasagar.

== Plot ==
The film begins with the love birds Raghu & Padma. Once, Raghu visits his elder sister's daughter Aliveelu's wedding, which breaks up due to dowdy problems. So, Raghu steps in and marries Aliveelu. After returning, he learns that Padma is pregnant, which forces him to marry her too. After that, Raghu backs for Aliveelu but cannot know her whereabouts and hears she is pregnant. They both give birth to baby boys, Anji & Prasad, who look identical twins. Time passes, and the boys grow up. In time, the siblings meet accidentally and discover themselves as the progeny of the same father. The rest of the story is about how they set out to unite their respective mothers with their fathers.

== Cast ==
- Jagapathi Babu as Raghu
- Divyavani as Padma
- Kinnera as Aliveelu
- Master Tarun as Anji & Prasad (dual role)
- Sivaji Raja as Jackie
- Babu Mohan as Thadika / Thadi Kanna Rao
- Jeet Mohan Mitra as Vamana Rao
- Annapurna as Annapurnamma
- Jayalalita as Rathi
- Y. Vijaya as Vardhanamma

== Soundtrack ==
Pillalu Diddina Kapuram

Film score by Vidyasagar
- Released: 1993
- Genre: Soundtrack
- Length: 20:22
- Label: Supreme Music
- Producer: Vidyasagar

Vidyasagar chronology
Mugguru Monagallu (1993)	Pillalu Diddina Kapuram (1993)	Bangaru Mogudu (1994)

Music composed by Vidyasagar. Music released on Supreme Music Company.

No.	Title	Lyrics	Singer(s)	Length
1.	"Iddaru Muddula"	Sahithi	S. P. Balasubrahmanyam, Minmini	4:29
2.	"Amma Chusane"	Sirivennela	Baby Kalpana	4:56
3.	"Mangala Gowri"	Jagdish Babu	Mano, K. S. Chithra, Minmini	4:15
4.	"Aaha Ding Dong"	Sahathi	Baby Kalpana	3:52
5.	"Malakpeta Poori"	Sahithi	Mano, Malgudi Subha	2:50
Total length:				20:22
