= Decoding Shankar =

Film documentary about Shankar Mahadevan

Decoding Shankar is an internationally acclaimed documentary directed by Deepti Sivan Pillay. It chronicles the life of Shankar Mahadevan and features renowned personalities such as Amitabh Bachchan, Aamir Khan, Javed Akhtar, Shreya Ghoshal. The documentary has been showcased at numerous international film festivals, including the Stuttgart International Film Festival in Germany, the Jecheon International Music and Film Festival in South Korea, and various festivals across the United States and Canada.

== Awards and Honor ==
- Got nomination to Indian Panorama-2018.
- Selected to Toronto International Film Festival
- Best Biographical Film award in the Toronto International Women Film Festival
- Special Jury Award at the Indo French International Film Festival
