= Manam Virumbuthe Unnai =

- Poster
- Directed by: M. Sivachandran
- Written by: M. Sivachandran
- Produced by: S. S. K. Sankaralingam
- Starring: Prabhu; Meena; Karan; Rajiv Krishna
- Cinematography: Ilavarasu
- Edited by: B. Lenin; V. T. Vijayan
- Music by: Ilaiyaraaja
- Production company: SSK. Productions
- Release date: 17 December 1999
- Running time: 140 minutes
- Country: India
- Language: Tamil

Manam Virumbuthe Unnai (transl. The heart prefers you) is a 1999 Indian Tamil-language romantic drama film directed by M. Sivachandran. The film stars Prabhu, Meena, Karan and Rajiv Krishna. It was released on 17 December 1999. The film's title is based off a song from Nerruku Ner (1997).

== Plot ==
Shanmugam, a widower, has two daughters Kavita and Anita. In fact, the children were abandoned and he brought them up without them knowing that they were orphans. Kavita and Anita pressure him to see the photo of their mother Amudha, he describes the girl of his dreams to his friend Sabapathy who then paints her portrait and Shanmugam shows them the portrait. By chance, the children see Priya, who looks like the woman in the portrait. Shanmugam, Kavita and Anita go to her home in the city.

Priya's family is an extended and rich family. Her relative Prakash secretly loves for Priya while Chandru is the supposed to be her future husband. In the city, Shanmugam meets his acquaintance Kaasi and he brings them to Priya's house. They decide to stay there. Then, Chandru finds out Priya's photo in his luggage. Afterwards, Chandru and Priya begin to tease Shanmugam. Shanmugam loves Priya but after knowing that Prakash is in love with her, he sacrifices his love. Prakash overhears Priya saying that she is the mother of two children. In the marriage, Prakash sends his henchmen to kill Shanmugam but he attacks everyone and Prakash insults Priya by stopping this marriage. Priya leaves the place, Shanmugam urges Prakash to kill him but Prakash breaks down emotionally. In the end, Shanmugam unites with Priya.

== Cast ==
- Prabhu as Shanmugam
- Meena as Priya
- Karan as Chandru
- Rajiv Krishna as Prakash
- Jai Ganesh as Priya's father
- Lakshmi as Saradha, Priya's mother
- Delhi Ganesh
- Devan as Ramesh
- S. S. Chandran as Kaasi
- Dhamu as Sabapathy
- P. Shwetha as Kavitha
- Baby Ashwini as Anita
- Latha as Latha

== Soundtrack ==
The soundtrack was composed by Ilaiyaraaja and released by Five Star Audio.

Track list
No.	Title	Lyrics	Singer(s)	Length
1.	"Ilavenirkala Panjami"	Arivumathi	Hariharan	4:54
2.	"Kutti Kuyilai"	Palani Bharathi	Hariharan, Bhavatharini	5:14
3.	"Manasa Killi"	Palani Bharathi	Srinivas, S. N. Surendar, Swarnalatha	5:44
4.	"Poomala Ponnukkoru"	Palani Bharathi	S. P. Balasubrahmanyam	4:53
5.	"Vaanathil Aadum"	Ponnadiyan	K. S. Chithra	2:11
6.	"Yetho Yetho"	Vaali	Sujatha, Hariharan	4:57
7.	"Vaanathil Aadumm" (Reprise)	Ponnadiyan	Mano	2:10
Total length:				30:03

== Accolades ==
Ilavarasu won the Tamil Nadu State Film Award for Best Cinematographer.
