= Ozhuki Ozhuki Ozhuki =

- Directed by: Sanjeev Sivan
- Written by: Beeyar Prasad
- Produced by: Deepti Pillai Sivan
- Starring: Sidhanshu Sanjeev; Soubin Shahir; Narain; Baiju Santhosh; Pauly Valsan
- Cinematography: Manoj Pillai
- Edited by: A. Sreekar Prasad
- Music by: Tuomas Kantelinen
- Production company: Tripod Motion Pictures
- Release date: 2 February 2024
- Country: India
- Language: Malayalam

Ozhuki Ozhuki Ozhuki is a 2024 Indian Malayalam-language film directed by director Sanjeev Sivan, written by Beeyar Prasad and produced by Deepti Pillai Sivan. The film stars Sidhanshu Sanjeev, Soubin Shahir, Narain, Baiju Santhosh and Pauly Valsan in lead roles. The cinematography is handled by Manoj Pillai and editing is done by A. Sreekar Prasad.

== Plot ==
The tale revolves around Paakaran, a 12-year-old boat boy, who, while fishing in the river, stumbles upon a corpse and becomes entangled in a murder investigation as he tries to give the deceased a proper farewell.

== Cast ==
- Sidhanshu Sanjeev
- Soubin Shahir
- Narain
- Baiju Santhosh
- Yadu Krishnan
- Pauly Valsan

== Release ==
The film was released in theatres on 2 February 2024. It was critically acclaimed by film reviewers.

== Accolades ==
- Official selection to Kolkata International Film Festival, India.
- Official selection to Moscow International Children's Film Festival, Russia.
