= Tarun (Telugu actor) =

Indian actor (born 1981)

- Born: Tarun Kumar; 8 January 1981 (age 45); Hyderabad, Telangana, India
- Occupation: Actor
- Years active: 1990–1995 (child actor); 2000–present
- Parent(s): Roja Ramani (mother); S Chakrapani (father)

Tarun Kumar (born 8 January 1981) is an Indian actor known for his works predominantly in Telugu cinema, with appearances in a few Tamil and Malayalam films.

Tarun began his career as a child actor and received the National Film Award for Best Child Artist for his performance in Anjali (1990), directed by Mani Ratnam. He has also won the Nandi Award for Best Child Actor three times.

He made his debut as a lead actor with Nuvve Kavali (2000) and starred in successful films like Priyamaina Neeku (2001), Nuvvu Leka Nenu Lenu (2002), Punnagai Desam (2002), Nuvve Nuvve (2002), Ninne Ishtapaddanu (2003), and Nava Vasantham (2007).

== Early life ==
Tarun was born into a Telugu family to actors Roja Ramani and Chakrapani. His mother, Roja Ramani, hails from Rajahmundry and was raised in Madras. She acted in multiple film industries, including Malayalam, Telugu, and Tamil, and was a prominent dubbing artist in Telugu cinema during the 1980s and 1990s, lending her voice to several leading actresses.

Chakrapani was born into a Telugu family with ancestral roots in Palasa, Srikakulam district. Chakrapani's grandfather lived in Vizag, while his father worked as a mechanical engineer for Indian Railways at Khurda Road Junction railway station in Orissa, where Chakrapani was raised. He acted in both Odia and Telugu films.

== Career ==
Tarun started his career as a child actor with the Telugu-language film Manasu Mamatha (1990). As a child, Tarun was a fan of Mani Ratnam's films such as Nayagan (1987) and Agni Nakshatram (1988) and accepted the offer to work in the Tamil-language film Anjali (1990) as distraught Shamlee's brother. Tarun won the National Film Award for Best Child Artist for his role in the film. He also received critical acclaim for the Malayalam film Abhayam (1991), which won the National Film Award for Best Children's Film, and earned him the Best Child Artist award at the Furoshiki Film Festival in Japan.

He also worked on the Telugu television serial Wonder Boy for Eenadu TV. He participated on quiz show but left the show after it interfered with his education. He won the Nandi Award for Best Child Actor for Manasu Mamatha (1990), Pillalu Diddina Kapuram (1991) and Teja (1992). Tarun collaborated again with Mani Rathnam in Thalapathi (1991) in a minor role. He also starred in Aditya 369 (1991), the Malayalam films Abhayam (1991), My Dear Muthachan (1992), and Johny (1993) and the Tamil film Meera (1992). Tarun also worked in the unreleased telefilm En Jeevane produced by Radhika.

After a hiatus, Tarun then worked on commercials for Spinz Talc and Fanta with Richa Pallod. His role in the Fanta advertisement helped him bag the lead role in K. Vijaya Bhaskar's Nuvve Kavali in 2000, the Telugu remake of Niram (1999). The film ran for more than a hundred days. For the film, he won the National Film Award for Best Feature Film in Telugu for that year, and Tarun won the Filmfare Award for Best Male Debut – South for his work in the film. Post Nuvve Kavali, he and Richa Pallod collaborated again for Chirujallu (2001), which released to negative reviews. He had some successful films such as Priyamaina Neeku (2001), Nuvvu Leka Nenu Lenu (2002) and Nuvve Nuvve (2002) while his other films such as Ela Cheppanu flopped. The success of Priyamaina Neeku lead the makers to release the film in Tamil. He made his full-fledged Tamil debut with Punnagai Desam (2002). That same year, he starred in the bilingual Enakku 20 Unakku 18/Nee Manasu Naaku Telusu, which was a failure despite having a notable soundtrack by A. R. Rahman and he stopped taking up Tamil films. Nava Vasantham, the Telugu remake of Punnagai Desam by the same director, and Sasirekha Parinayam (2009) were his last successful films. He collaborated again with K. Vijaya Bhaskar for Bhale Dongalu (2008), a movie inspired by Bonnie and Clyde, but the film flopped.

After a four year gap, he returned with Chukkalanti Ammayi Chakkanaina Abbayi (2013), Yuddham (2014), Veta (2014) and Idi Naa Love Story (2018), all of which had a low-key release.

== Filmography ==
=== As child artist ===
Year	Film	Role	Language	Notes
1990	Manasu Mamatha		Telugu	Nandi Award for Best Child Actor
1990	Anjali	Arjun	Tamil	National Film Award for Best Child Artist
1990	Bujjigadi Babai		Tamil	
1991	Thalapathi	Petty thief	Tamil	Cameo appearance
1991	Surya IPS	Surya's step brother	Telugu	
1991	Abhayam	Vinu	Malayalam	Best Child Artist Award - Furoshiki Film Festival
1991	Aditya 369	Kishore Kumar	Telugu	
1992	Meera	Jesu	Tamil	
1992	Teja	Teja	Telugu	Nandi Award for Best Child Actor
1992	Gowramma		Telugu	
1992	My Dear Muthachan	Manu	Malayalam	
1993	Pillalu Diddina Kapuram	Anji and Prasad	Telugu	Dual Role; Nandi Award for Best Child Actor
1993	Repati Rowdy		Telugu	
1993	Johnny	Johnny	Malayalam	
1995	Vajram	Young Chakri	Telugu	

=== As an actor ===
Year	Film	Role	Language	Notes
2000	Nuvve Kavali	Tarun	Telugu	
2000	Uncle	Raja	Telugu	
2001	Priyamaina Neeku	Ganesh	Telugu	
2001	Chirujallu	Vamsi	Telugu	
2002	Nuvvu Leka Nenu Lenu	Radha Krishna	Telugu	
2002	Punnagai Desam	Ganesh	Tamil	
2002	Adrustam	Tarun	Telugu	
2002	Nuvve Nuvve	Rishi	Telugu	AP Cinegoers Special Jury Award for Best Performance
2003	Ninne Ishtapaddanu	Charan	Telugu	
2003	Ela Cheppanu	Sekhar	Telugu	
2003	Enakku 20 Unakku 18	Sridhar	Tamil	Bilingual film
2003	Nee Manasu Naaku Telusu	Sridhar	Telugu	Bilingual film
2004	Sakhiya	Hari	Telugu	
2005	Soggadu	Ravi	Telugu	
2005	Oka Oorilo	Seenu	Telugu	
2007	Nava Vasantham	Ganesh	Telugu	
2008	Bhale Dongalu	Ramu	Telugu	
2009	Sasirekha Parinayam	Anand/Abhiram	Telugu	
2013	Chukkalanti Ammayi Chakkanaina Abbayi	Sanjay	Telugu	
2014	Yuddham	Rishi	Telugu	
2014	Veta	Karthik	Telugu	
2018	Idi Naa Love Story	Abhi	Telugu	
2020	Anukoni Athidhi	—N/a	Telugu	Dubbed version of Athiran; voice for Fahadh Faasil

=== Television ===
- Wonder Boy (ETV)
