= Abhayam (1991 film) =

- Directed by: Sivan
- Written by: Sivan
- Produced by: CFSI
- Starring: Madhu; Parvathy Jayaram; Raghavan; Tarun Kumar; Kottayam Santha; Ramachandran; Baby Ambili
- Cinematography: Santosh Sivan
- Edited by: A. Sreekar Prasad
- Release date: 1991
- Running time: 93 minutes
- Country: India
- Language: Malayalam

Abhayam (English: Shelter) is a 1991 Malayalam children's film written and directed by Sivan. It was produced by Children's Film Society of India (CFSI) and starred Madhu, Parvathy Jayaram, Tarun Kumar, Ramachandran, Kottayam Santha, Raghavan and Baby Ambili. The film was dubbed into Hindi as Main Phir Aaunga.

== Cast ==
- Madhu
- Parvathy Jayaram
- Raghavan
- Tarun Kumar
- Kottayam Santha
- Ramachandran
- Baby Ambili

== Awards ==
The film has won the following awards.

7th International Children's Film Festival, India

- Silver Elephant Award
- Special Jury Award

39th National Film Awards

- Best Children's Film

Film Festival Raggazzi, Bellinzona, Switzerland

- Prize "Environment and Quality of Life" signed by "Ecology Jury" composed of 14-16 children to the Director.

1st Uruguay Children Film Festival

- Special Mention and Award statue made of earth, and Certificate to the Director.
