= Chirujallu =

- Chirujallu DVD cover
- Directed by: Sriram Balaji
- Produced by: G. V. G. Raju
- Starring: Tarun; Richa
- Cinematography: Ram Prasad
- Music by: Vandemataram Srinivas
- Production company: SSC Art Productions
- Release date: 17 August 2001
- Country: India
- Language: Telugu

Chirujallu (transl. Drizzle) is a 2001 Indian Telugu-language romance film directed by Sriram Balaji. The film stars Tarun, Richa, and S. P. Balasubrahmanyam in the lead roles. The music was composed by Vandemataram Srinivas. The film released on 17 August 2001. Chirujallu received negative reviews and was a box-office failure.

== Plot ==
The story follows Vamsi, an orphan with many talents, and Radhika, the daughter of industrialist Durga Prasad. The two meet on Valentine’s Day under tense circumstances but eventually fall in love.

Durga Prasad supports their relationship and agrees to their marriage. As Vamsi and Radhika prepare for their future together, Vamsi travels to Delhi to attend a Civil Services interview. However, he is kidnapped, tortured, and later abandoned in an asylum. The remainder of the story focuses on how Vamsi overcomes these challenges and whether the couple reunite.

== Cast ==
- Tarun as Vamsi
- Richa Pallod as Radhika
- S. P. Balasubrahmanyam as Durga Prasad
- Brahmanandam
- Giri Babu
- M. S. Narayana
- Sana
- Ali
- Harsha Vardhan
- Siva Reddy
- Jeeva
- Banerjee
- Master Gajula Uday Shankar

== Music ==
The soundtrack was composed by Vandemataram Srinivas.

Track Listing
No.	Title	Lyrics	Singer(s)	Length
1.	"Hai Rama"	Veturi	S. P. Balasubrahmanyam, S. P. Charan, Sujatha Mohan	5:02
2.	"Kalalalo Nuvve"	Sirivennela Sitarama Sastry	Udit Narayan, Kavita Krishnamurthy	5:02
3.	"Radhe .. Radhe"	Sirivennela Sitarama Sastry	K. S. Chithra, S. P. Balasubrahmanyam, Vishala, Vandemataram Srinivas	6:45
4.	"Bhoodevi Bugga"	Veturi	Vandemataram Srinivas, K. S. Chithra	5:39
5.	"Rende Rendanta"	Veturi	S. P. Balasubrahmanyam, Radha Sirisha, Vandemataram Srinivas, Timothy	4:37
6.	"Kurisindi Chirujallu"	Sirivennela Sitarama Sastry	Udit Narayan, Vishala	5:27

== Reception ==
Jeevi of Idlebrain.com wrote, "First half of the film is OK. But the second half is unimaginative and was poorly handled. This is a typical formula film tried to cash in the success of the pair 'Tarun-Richa' of Nuvve Kavali".

CV of Telugucinema.com reviewed Chirujallu as a disappointing youth love story with an unimpressive screenplay and predictable twists, despite Tarun's commendable performance.

Andhra Today wrote "The director displays no maturity in the screen-play as well as the treatment of the story. It disappoints and falls to win any appreciation from the audience".

Indiainfo wrote "Though Tarun and Richa did good job but their efforts were wasted in an utter nonsense film. Insipid direction is the main drawback. Watching this film is really pain in the neck. Music by Vandemataram Srinivas is okay".
