= Keshu =

- Directed by: Sivan
- Written by: K. V. Mohankumar; Sivan
- Produced by: Children's Film Society, India
- Starring: Navaneeth Krishnan; Priyanka Nair; Kaladharan; Lakshmi Krishnamoorthy
- Cinematography: Manoj Pillai
- Edited by: K. Sreenivas
- Music by: Arun Sidharrth; Vishvajith
- Production companies: Children's Film society India
- Release date: 28 November 2009 (International Film Festival of India)
- Running time: 87 minutes
- Country: India
- Language: Malayalam

Keshu is a 2009 Indian Malayalam children's film directed by Sivan. The film won by Best Children's Film award at the 57th National Film Awards. It also won the Kerala State Film Award for Best Children's Film of 2009.

== Plot ==
Keshu (Navaneeth Krishnan) is a deaf boy who lost his mother when he was born. He was raised by his maternal uncle (Kaladharan) and wife (Lakshmi Krishnamoorty). Being mischievous, there were many complaints against Keshu by the villagers. His uncle kept punishing him, but to no avail. The only person who Keshu could find solace was his distant relative and the maid of the house, Devu (Amala). Then, Shalini (Priyanka Nair), a drawing teacher transferred to that village started living with the family. Keshu did not spare her from his mischief, but she did not complain to anyone, and instead started liking Keshu. He reciprocated the affection shown to him and there was a gradual change in his behaviour. She encouraged him to take up drawing and even convinced his uncle to enroll him in a special school for the deaf and the dumb. Keshu wins an international award for his painting, The elephant and the Mahout, and becomes the darling of the whole village. The end of the happy chapter came as a letter to Shalini informing that her marriage is fixed. Her return was a torment to Keshu, his family as well as Shalini. Keshu remained sad and desperate for her return for days, but eventually realised that she will not come back. He asked his uncle to take him back to his school, and his uncle took him back to his world of colours and drawings.

== Accolades ==
- International Film Festival of India, 2009 Official Selection, Indian Panorama
- National Film Award for Best Children's Film - 2009
- Kerala State Film Award for Best Children's Film - 2009
- CMS International Children's Film Festival, India 2010 - Special Mention to the Child Artist

== Controversies ==
It was alleged that Sanjeev Sivan, son of director Sivan, was part of the regional jury of the film award and had allegedly recommended his father's film for the award and hence it was illegal and inappropriate to give the award to 'Keshu'. The Kerala High court stayed the presentation of the National award to the film following the complaint. Filmmaker and jury member Harikumar alleged that it was a remake of his 2001 film Pularvettom. The petition was dismissed finally by the Highcourt of Kerala, observing that Sanjeev Sivan was not part of the regional jury while Keshu was nominated for contesting for the national award.
