= Sanjeev Sivan =

Indian film director and screenwriter

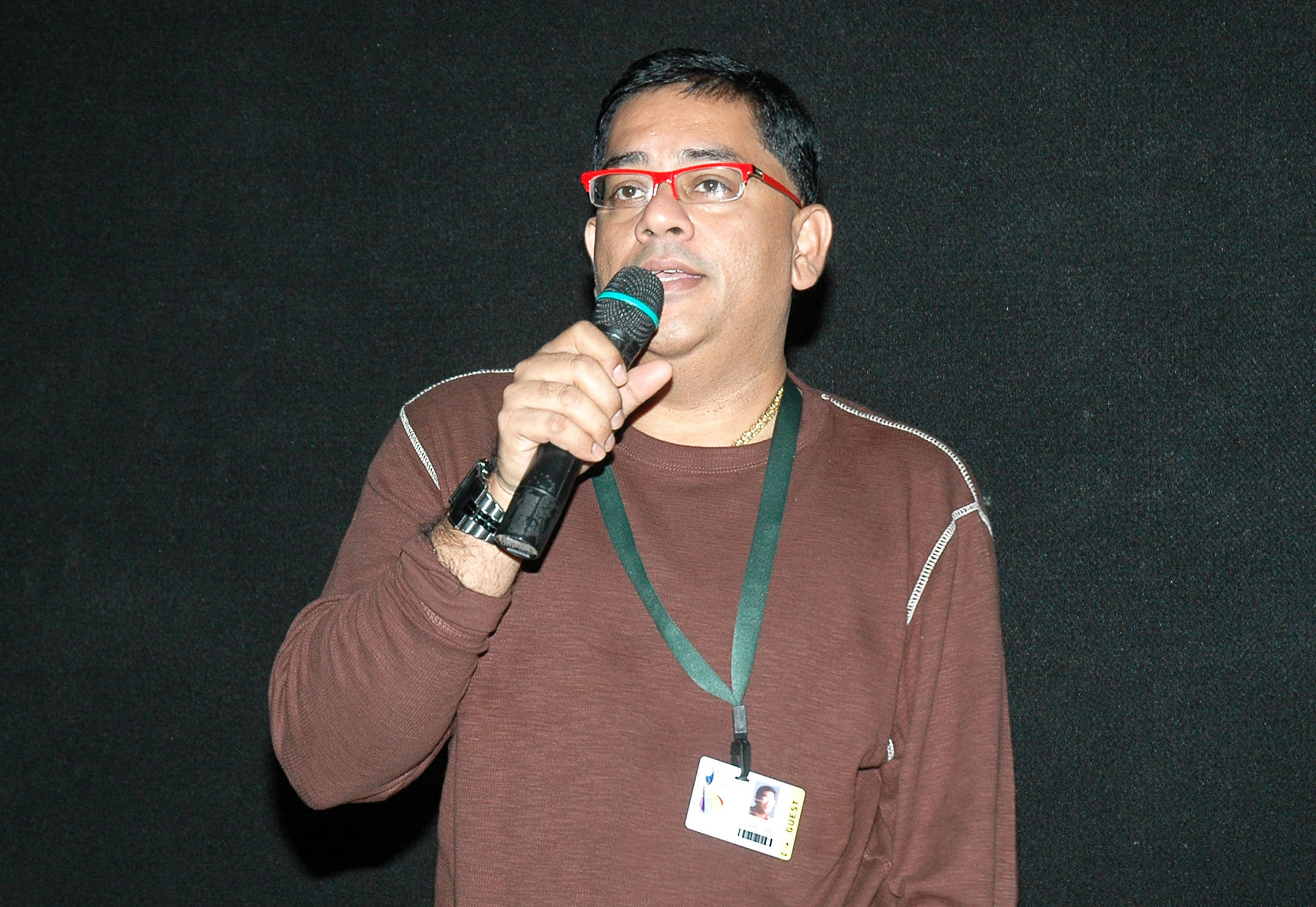
- presentation of the film (Achtung Baby), 2010
- Born: Haripad, Kerala, India
- Education: New York University
- Occupations: Film director; film producer; writer
- Spouse: Deepti Pillay Sivan
- Relatives: Sangeeth Sivan (brother), Santosh Sivan (brother)

Sanjeev Sivan is an Indian film director and screenwriter who works in the Malayalam and Hindi film industries. He is best known for directing the 2004 Malayalam film Aparichithan starring Mammootty.

== Family ==
Sanjeev Sivan is the youngest son of national award-winning filmmaker Sivan. His brothers Santosh Sivan and Sangeeth Sivan also work in the film industry.

== Career ==
He started his career as an executive producer of his father's national and state award-winning feature films, namely Johnny and Abhayam. In 2004 he directed the movie Aparichithan and in 2014 he directed Venalodungathe starring national award-winning actors Salim Kumar and Seema Biswas in lead roles based on real life incidents. The movie also won an Ammonite Award at the 6th Hidden Gems Film Festival-2014, Calgary, Canada.

After Aparichithan, Sanjeev directed around 30 short films and 75 documentaries, which earned him international film awards. He has also directed documentaries for the National Geographic Channel, and won an award from the Ecofilms festival 2010 in Greece. He has directed documentaries for Discovery Channel and Al Jazeera.

Sanjeev was a jury member for the 57th National Film Awards and the Indian Documentary Producers Association (IDPA) Film Awards. He is the recipient of Karamveer Puraskar - 2015.

== Awards ==
=== State awards ===
As executive producer:

- Johnny - won Kerala State Film Award for Best Children's Film
- Abhayam - won Best Children's Film at the Kerala State Film Awards
- Keshu - won Best Children's Film at the Kerala State Film Awards

=== National awards ===
As executive producer:

- Abhayam - won Best Children's Film at the National Film Awards
- Abhayam - won Best Children's Film at the Indian Panorama
- Keshu - won Best Children's Film at the National Film Awards
- Keshu - won the Indian Panorama for Best Children's Film

=== Other awards ===
As director:

- Achtung Baby, a film on Indo-Aryan race - selected at the Indian Panorama
- Conferred "Karamveer Puraskar" for his contribution to Indian cinema and documentary space
- Underground Inferno - won Best Environmental Film at the International Film Festival of India Goa 2010

=== International awards ===
As executive producer:

- Oru Yatra Fipresci - award at the Hong Kong International Film Festival
- Abhayam - won Best Children's Film at the International Children's Film Festival of India

As director:

- Underground Inferno - won Best Environmental film at Ecofilms Rodos International Films and Visual Arts Festival, Greece
- Venalodungathe - Ammonite Award at the 6th Hidden Gems Film Festival 2014, Calgary, Canada

== Filmography ==
=== Feature films ===
| Year | Film | Language | Credited as | | | Notes |
| Year | Film | Language | Director | Writer | Producer | Notes |
|---|---|---|---|---|---|---|
| 1991 | Abhayam | Malayalam | ✗ | ✗ | ✓ | As executive producer |
| 1993 | Johnny | Malayalam | ✗ | ✗ | ✓ | As executive producer |
| 2004 | Aparichithan | Malayalam | ✓ | ✓ | ✗ | Directorial debut |
| 2009 | Keshu | Malayalam | ✗ | ✗ | ✓ | As executive producer |
| 2012 | Venalodungathe | Malayalam | ✓ | ✓ | ✗ | Director |

=== Documentaries ===
| Year | Film | Language | Credited as | | | Notes |
| Year | Film | Language | Director | Writer | Producer | Notes |
|---|---|---|---|---|---|---|
| 2009 | Underground Inferno | English | ✓ | ✗ | ✗ | Director |
| 2007 | The Achtung Baby | English | ✓ | ✗ | ✗ | Director |
| 2010 | After Life | English | ✓ | ✗ | ✗ | Director |
