= Kalippattam =

1993 Malayalam movie

- Poster
- Directed by: Venu Nagavalli
- Written by: Venu Nagavalli
- Produced by: Asharaf
- Starring: Mohanlal; Urvashi; Deepti Pillay Sivan
- Cinematography: K.P Nambyathiri
- Edited by: N.Gopalakrishnan
- Music by: Raveendran; Lyrics: Bichu Thirumala; Konniyoor Bhas (Mozhiyazhakum)
- Distributed by: Abhinaya; Ramya
- Release date: 23 December 1993
- Country: India
- Language: Malayalam

Kalippattam (transl. Toy) is a 1993 Indian Malayalam-language film written and directed by Venu Nagavalli and starring Mohanlal, Urvashi, Thilakan, Kaviyoor Ponnamma, Jagathy and Nedumudi Venu. Mohanlal also sang a song ("Vazhiyoram") with Chithra for the film. The story is about the love between a violinist played by Mohanlal and a terminally ill (with aplastic anaemia) girl played by Urvashi. The music and background score were composed by Raveendran.

== Plot ==
Venugopal is a factory worker who struggles to provide for his family. When he is dismissed from his position, he tries desperately to reach out to the owner, Menon, to get himself reinstated. During these encounters, Menon's daughter, Saro, becomes captivated by Venu's music and wit, and eventually they get married.

Menon arranges the marriage after revealing to Venu that Saro is terminally ill with aplastic anaemia. Venu accedes as the union will lift his family out of destitution. But in time, he truly falls in love with Saro. They go on to have a daughter. Saro's condition worsens, and she succumbs following a bone marrow transplant. Years later, Venu is now a rich businessman, living with his and Saro's teenage daughter Ammu, as well as his friends and well wishers. He however learns that Ammu also has the same disease as her mother, but decides to put a loving face in front of Ammu as to not worry her. One day, a young man by the name of Hari comes to Venu's house hoping to find employment. Venu sees a reflection of his younger days in him, while Ammu takes a liking to his innocence. Realizing that Hari could be to Ammu, what he was to Saro, Venu decides to take him in with good hopes.

== Cast ==
- Mohanlal as Venugopal G. / Venu
- Urvashi as Sarojam (Saro), Venu's wife
- Deepti Sivan as Ammu, Venugopal's and Saro's daughter
- Thilakan as K. MK. Menon, Sarojam's father
- Jagathy as Thakaraparambil Unnikrishnan / Unni, Venu's friend / brother-in-law
- Kaviyoor Ponnamma as Karthyayani Amma, Sarojam's mother
- Nedumudi Venu as Freddy Uncle, Menon's friend
- K. R. Vijaya as Kalyani (Doctor), Sarojam's aunt
- Siddique as N. N. Kutty, Venu's friend
- Mamukkoya as Ismail, Venu's friend
- Prem Kumar as Lambodharan, security guard
- K. P. A. C. Lalitha as Devaki, Venu's mother
- Kalpana as Meenakshi (Meenu), Venu's younger sister and Unni's wife
- Bindu Panicker as Sreekumari, Venu's younger sister
- Aranmula Ponnamma as Mrs. Ketharam Kuttappan Nair, Venu's grandmother
- Thikkurissy Sukumaran Nair as Venu's grandfather
- Ganesh Kumar as Renjith / Renji, Kalyani's son and Menon's relative
- Shivaji as Chandran, Renji's friend
- Nandu as Remanan, the horse cart driver
- Oduvil Unnikrishnan as Karunan aka Ottappalam Chittappan, Venu's uncle
- Soman as Dr. Warrier
- Vineeth as Harikrishnan
- N. L. Balakrishnan as Santhosh, Watchman
- Aliyar as Raveendran / Ravi, Sreekumari's husband
- T. P. Madhavan as Madhavan

== Soundtrack ==
The song lyrics were penned by bichu thirumala with Raveendran composing tunes for the same.

1. "Mozhiyazhakum" - K J Yesudas, K S Chithra
2. "Konchi, Konchi" - M G Sreekumar
3. "Vazhiyoram" - Mohanlal, K S Chithra
4. "Kalipattamayi" - K J Yesudas
