= Johnny (1993 film) =

- Directed by: Sangeeth Sivan
- Written by: Beeyar Prasad
- Story by: Sangeeth Sivan
- Produced by: Sivan
- Starring: Tarun Kumar; Santhi Krishna
- Cinematography: Santosh Sivan
- Edited by: Bose
- Music by: Mohan Sithara
- Release date: 10 November 1993
- Country: India
- Language: Malayalam

Johnny is a 1993 Indian Malayalam-language children's period film directed by Sangeeth Sivan and starring Tarun Kumar and Shanthi Krishna in lead roles. The film is based on the life of Don Bosco.

== Cast ==
- Tarun Kumar as Johnny
- Master Vineeth as Marcos
- Master Rajeev as Jobe
- Master Vishnu Prasad as Mathai
- Master Nischal as Jose
- Baby Arya as Susy
- Johnson as Jesus
- Shanthi Krishna as Mother Margaret
- Krishna Prasad as Antony
- Kaladharan as Father Calosso
- K. K. Vishvanath as Michael
- Chacko Koshy as Aloysious
- Santhosh as Thoma
- Manjusha as Theresa
- Nimmi as Mrs. Aloysious

== Reception ==
Meera John Chakrabarthy of Sunday Times said "It's hard to pick holes in this film. The technique is brilliant and the story, wholesome and clean. Little wonder then that the Malayalam film Johny is coasting along, having picked up two Kerala state awards for the best children's film and the film critics' award, and has been entered in several International film festivals, among them, Finland, Chicago and Iran".

== Awards ==
- Kerala State Film Award for Best Children's Film
