= Bobby Darling =

Indian actress

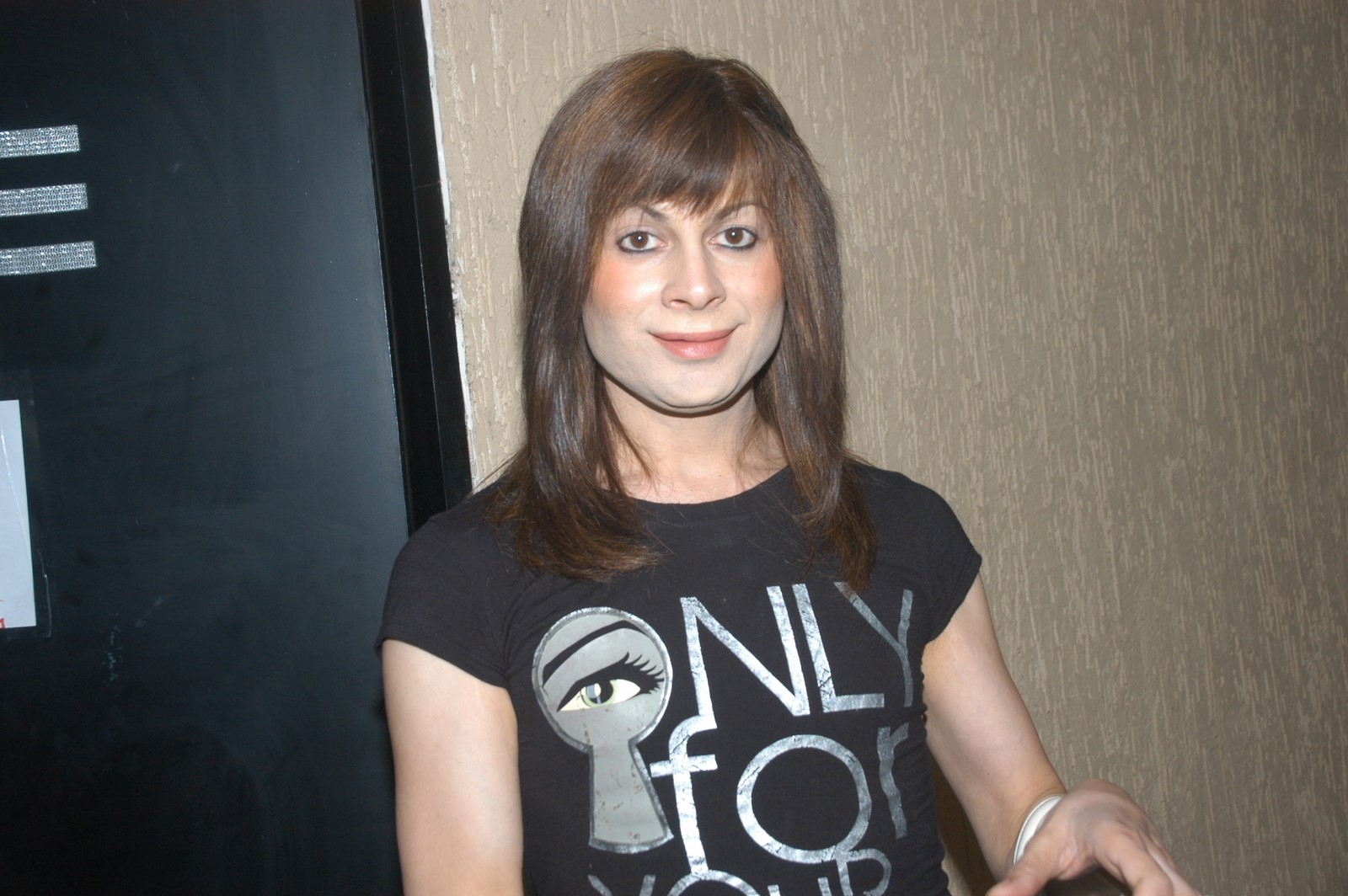
- Darling in 2009
- Born: Pankaj Sharma; Nashik, India
- Occupation: Actress
- Years active: 1999–present
- Known for: Navarasa (2005)
- Spouse: Ramneek Sharma (m. 2016; div. 2017)

Pakhi Sharma (born Pankaj Sharma), known professionally as Bobby Darling, is an Indian actress known for her work in Hindi films and television.

== Early and personal life ==
Pakhi Sharma was born in Nashik, India, as Pankaj Sharma. She said in a 2009 interview that her appearance on the reality show Sacch Ka Saamna, helped reunite her with her father. The two were brought together on the show when her dad was the special surprise guest.

In October 2015, Darling declared that she was going to marry Ramneek Sharma, a Bhopal-based businessman. The couple married in February 2016.

In September 2017, Darling filed for divorce against Ramneek Sharma, citing cheating, breach of trust, matrimonial cruelty and unnatural sex. In May 2018, Ramneek Sharma was arrested and sent to jail on charges of domestic violence. In a message, Bobby said, “This is to inform all my fans, friends and family that my husband was arrested by Delhi police on 11.5.18 and was in police custody for 4 days. Thereafter, he moved application for bail before Delhi courts which has been rejected. Justice is being meted out!”.

== Awards ==
- 2005, Best Supporting Actor/Actress, Monaco International Film Festival, (Monaco) for Navarasa

== Filmography ==
Year	Film	Role	Notes
1999	Taal	Dress Designer	
2001	Style	—N/a	
2002	Na Tum Jaano Na Hum	—N/a	
2002	Maine Dil Tujhko Diya		
2002	Jeena Sirf Merre Liye		
2003	Valentine Days		
2003	Stumped		
2003	Chalte Chalte		
2004	Tum – A Dangerous Obsession		
2004	Dil Ne Jise Apna Kahaa		
2004	Tauba Tauba		
2005	Page 3		
2005	Kyaa Kool Hai Hum	Kiran	
2005	Nazar	Dancer	
2005	Navarasa	Bobby	Tamil film
2006	Mr 100% – The Real Player	Herself	
2006	Naughty Boy	Herself	
2006	Saawan – The Love Season	Herself	
2006	Tom, Dick, and Harry	Herself	
2006	Ek Se Mera Kya Hoga	Herself	
2006	Katputtli	Herself	
2006	Hota Hai Dil Pyaar Mein Paagal	Herself	
2006	Apna Sapna Money Money	Bobby Mohabbati	
2007	Traffic Signal		
2008	Phir Tauba Tauba		
2008	Mr. White Mr. Black		
2008	Dhoom Dadakka		
2008	Money Hai Toh Honey Hai		
2009	Shadow		
2009	Club '07		
2009	Potadar Kirti		
2010	Will You Marry Me?		
2010	Problem Mein Phas Gaya Yaar		
2010	Apartment	Guest	
2011	Naughty Girl	Herself	
2012	Daal Mein Kuch Kaala Hai	Herself	
2012	Shirin Farhad Ki Toh Nikal Padi	Bobbylina Boywala	
2013	Super Model	Bobby	
2014	Hasee Toh Phasee	Herself	In song 'Drama Queen Hai'
2014	Dee Saturday Night	Herself	

=== Television ===
Year	Show	Role	Notes	Channel
2004	Kaahin Kissii Roz	Cameo		Star Plus
2005	Kasautii Zindagii Kay	Mr. Softy		Star Plus
2005	Fame Gurukul	Contestant		Sony TV
2006	Bigg Boss 1	Herself/Contestant	Evicted, Day 14	Sony TV
2006	Kitne Cool Hai Hum	Herself		Zee TV
2007	Kyunki Saas Bhi Kabhi Bahu Thi	Herself	Cameo	Star Plus
2008	Late Night Show with Begum Nawazish Ali	Host		—N/a
2009	Sach Ka Saamna	Contestant	Herself	Star Plus
2010	Emotional Atyachar	Herself		Bindaas TV
2011	Iss Pyaar Ko Kya Naam Doon?	Herself	Sanaya Irani's friend	Star Plus
2012	Aahat	Bobby		Sony TV
2013	Yeh Hai Aashiqui	Friend and business manager		Bindaas TV
2014	Sasural Simar Ka	Bobby	Khushi's friend	Colors TV
2019	Krishnakoli	Karry	Aditya and Radharani's Make Up Friend	Zee Bangla
