= Navarasa (film) =

- Japanese release poster
- Directed by: Santosh Sivan
- Written by: Santosh Sivan
- Produced by: Santosh Sivan
- Starring: P. Shwetha; Kushboo; Bobby Darling
- Cinematography: Santosh Sivan
- Edited by: A. Sreekar Prasad
- Music by: Aslam Mustafa
- Release date: 21 October 2005
- Running time: 90 minutes
- Country: India
- Language: Tamil

Navarasa (transl. Nine Emotions) is a 2005 Indian Tamil language film directed by Santosh Sivan. It has met with a strong reception since its release and has been shown at many film festivals across the world, including the Singapore International Film Festival, the Pusan International Film Festival, Korea, the Taipei Golden Horse Film Festival, Taiwan, the São Paulo International Film Festival, Brazil and the Lyon Asian Film Festival, France among others. In January 2006, it was selected as an official entry to the International Film Festival Rotterdam.

== Plot ==
The film revolves around the story of a young girl Shweta taking her first steps towards adulthood. Ready for the adventure, the thirteen-year-old is upbeat. However, she soon discovers that every night, her uncle Gautam (Kushboo) transforms himself into a woman to lead a completely different life. When Shweta confronts Gautam on the matter, Gautam tells her he wishes to run away and marry Aravan at a local festival, the Koovagam Festival.

The festival is held annually, where people of the third gender regularly meet to re-enact the story of Aravan, a character from the epic Mahabharata. Shweta decides to find her uncle and bring him back home, and along the way, she makes new friends of the third gender and discovers a whole new culture.

== Cast ==
- P. Shwetha as Shwetha
- Kushboo as Gautam
- Bobby Darling
- Neethu S. Nair as Mohini & Lord Krishna

== Production ==
After interviewing several people of the third gender, Santosh Sivan decided to develop a story and make a film on them.

== Awards ==
The film has won the following awards since its release:

2005 Monaco International Film Festival (Monaco)

- Won – Best Supporting Actor – Bobby Darling
- Won – Angel Independent Spirit Award – Navarasa – Santosh Sivan

2005 National Film Awards (India)

- Won – Silver Lotus Award – Best Regional Film (Tamil) – Navarasa – Santosh Sivan
