= Bhram (TV series) =

- Genre: Horror
- Written by: K Hari Kumar
- Story by: K Hari Kumar
- Directed by: Sangeeth Sivan; Amit Bathija
- Starring: Kalki Koechlin; Sanjay Suri; Bhumika Chawla
- Music by: Kingshuk Chakravarty
- Country of origin: India
- Original language: Hindi
- No. of seasons: 1
- No. of episodes: 8 (list of episodes)

Production
- Producers: Bunty Raghav; Sangeeth Sivan
- Cinematography: Vidushi Tiwari; Suman Sahu; Sandeep Yadav
- Editors: Saju Chandran; Pratik Chitalia
- Camera setup: Vidushi Tiwari; Akhil Sasidharan
- Production companies: Inspire Creation; Sangeeth Sivan Production; Mehra Entertainment

Original release
- Network: Zee5
- Release: 24 October 2019 – present

Bhram is an Indian Hindi-language psychological thriller TV series, wherein the protagonist has PTSD and traverses all kinds of extremes (paranormal, mythical, psychological) in order to unearth a long-forgotten truth. The twisted forgotten past reveals new truths and changes everything. The web series streams on Zee5 in India.

== Cast ==
- Kalki Koechlin as Alisha Khanna
- Bhumika Chawla as Ankita Paul
- Sanjay Suri as Peter Paul
- Eijaz Khan as Pradeep Choudhary
- Chandan Roy Sanyal as Insp. Rawat
- Satyadeep Misra as Fr. Alfred Joseph
- Sangeeta Ghosh as Durga
- Aashit Chaterji as Abdul
- Vikram Kochar as Avtar
- Ahtesham Hussain as Constable Shamsher
- Garima Kaushal as Kritika Paul
- Omkar Kapoor as Yash Khanna
- Anjali Tatrari as Ayesha Sayyed
- Tushar Bakshi as Alfie
- Mir Sarwar as Elder Yakub
  - Ansh Sinha as Younger Yakub
- Utsav Sarkar as Paglu
- Dharampreet Gill as Immanuel
- Chetan Sharma as PP
- Vikram Dwivedi as PC
- Harsh Vashisht as Dr Saini
- Jashn Agnihotri as Mrs. Saini an actress and model whose portfolio includes projects like AltBalaji's Fixerr and Zee Music's 6 Ekkey, alongside leading roles in regional Punjabi cinema, including the horror-comedy Kutte Fail.
- Rajendranath Zutshi as Dr Rao
- Hari Kumar K. as Journalist

== Episodes ==
No. overall	No. in season	Title	Directed by	Produced by	Original release date
1	1	"The Porter Hill Murder"	Sangeeth Sivan, Amit Bathija	Bunty Raghav, Sangeeth Sivan	24 October 2019
2	2	"Help Me"	Sangeeth Sivan, Amit Bathija	Bunty Raghav, Sangeeth Sivan	24 October 2019
3	3	"Down the Cursed Road"	Sangeeth Sivan, Amit Bathija	Bunty Raghav, Sangeeth Sivan	24 October 2019
4	4	"The Guilt"	Sangeeth Sivan, Amit Bathija	Bunty Raghav, Sangeeth Sivan	24 October 2019
5	5	"The Drowning"	Sangeeth Sivan, Amit Bathija	Bunty Raghav, Sangeeth Sivan	24 October 2019
6	6	"Haunted Memory Lane"	Sangeeth Sivan, Amit Bathija	Bunty Raghav, Sangeeth Sivan	24 October 2019
7	7	"Skeletons in the Cupboard"	Sangeeth Sivan, Amit Bathija	Bunty Raghav, Sangeeth Sivan	24 October 2019
8	8	"The King of the Jungle"	Sangeeth Sivan, Amit Bathija	Bunty Raghav, Sangeeth Sivan	24 October 2019
