= Kutty (2001 film) =

2001 film by Janaki Vishwanathan

- Directed by: Janaki Vishwanathan
- Written by: Janaki Vishwanathan; Ramesh Arunachalam; Sivasankari
- Produced by: Janaki Vishwanathan; Ramesh Arunachalam
- Starring: P. Shwetha; Ramesh Aravind; Kausalya; Nassar; Eashwari Rao
- Cinematography: Thangar Bachan
- Edited by: A. Sreekar Prasad
- Music by: Ilayaraja
- Release date: 10 August 2001
- Running time: 118 minutes
- Country: India
- Language: Tamil

Kutty is a 2001 Indian Tamil language drama film directed by Janaki Vishwanathan starring P. Shwetha in the titular role with Ramesh Arvind, Kausalya, Nassar, Eashwari Rao and M. N. Rajam amongst others in supporting roles. The film's music is composed by Ilayaraja. Upon release, the film met with widespread critical acclaim.

== Plot ==
The film revolves around a young girl who is forced into child labour working for an urban family after a tragedy in her own family. Paavaadai is a potter living in a village in the outskirts of Madurai. Even though his profession is in a miserable condition, he has high hopes for his daughter Kannammaa and raises her with much affection. Unfortunately, he dies in an accident and this forces Kannammaa to be sent to work for an urban family. The girl is quite happy about this, thinking about the prospects of good food and clothes. The family's working couple also treat her with kindness. However, the arrival of the mother-in-law changes everything. Kutty doesn't get enough food to eat and is mistreated by the old woman and her grandson. Day-by-day things get worsen. Once, Kutty's relatives come to see how she is doing. The grandmother behaves kindly to Kutty and makes them believe that she is completely happy there. Kutty too fails to communicate with them about her misery. Kutty watches the teenage girl who works in the opposite apartment being molested. And in a few days, she learns that the girl committed suicide. Even though supported by the couple (which infuriates the old woman), Kutty becomes desperate and decides to send a letter to her mother asking her to take her away back to the village. She tries to seek the help of a store owner, who is very kind to her. However, matters do not improve when Kutty reveals that she doesn't know the name of her village but she just knows the directions. One night, she decides to run away but she runs right into a man, who has a shop set up right next to Vivek's. He promises to help her and boards her onto a train. The man is then seen speaking to another man and bargaining for more money. The man says to Kutty that the other man will take good care of her and will reach her to her mother. But, the train is actually leaving not for her village, but to Mumbai, indicating that perhaps Kutty will be sold to a brothel. The film ends with showing Kutty's anticipated face on the prospect of going back to her mother.

== Cast ==
- P. Shwetha as Kanamma (Kutty)
- Ramesh Aravind as Ranganathan
- Kausalya as Rohini
- Nassar as Pavadai, Kutty's father
- Eashwari Rao as Chenthamarai, Kutty's mother
- M. N. Rajam as Ranganathan's mother
- Vivek as Owner of provision store
- R. S. Shivaji as Panwala
- S. N. Lakshmi as Viruthamba, Pavadai's mother
- Master Suraj as Vicky
- Ilavarasu as Pazhaniappan
- Kalairani as Valli

== Production ==
The film was made in 20 days on a shoestring budget of ₹70 lakh (worth ₹5.5 crore in 2021 prices).

== Reception ==
A critic from Rediff.com wrote that "This film is not an 'entertainer', it doesn't set out to make you feel good. But, it is a movie you can't afford to miss". The Hindu wrote "Adapted from a story by Sivasankari, Kutty is also a young woman's passion for causes - Janaki (who has done the scripting and screenplay along with her husband - producer Ramesh Arunachalam) has put together a team which has created a film that will remain long in the audience's minds - Ilayaraja with his musical score with lyrics by Mu Mehta (except for Hangachi Thangachi where the lyrics are by Raja himself) has given some somber moments to an already moving film". Chennai Online wrote "Kutti touches a chord in one's heart, and does make one feel guilty about the callousness with which domestic helps are treated". Sify wrote "The film leaves a lump in your throat and does not sermonise. Hats off to director Janaki Viswanathan and her producer husband Ramesh Arunachalam for making a bold and thought provoking movie".

== Awards ==
The film has won the following awards since its release:

2002 Cairo International Children's Film Festival (Egypt)

- Won - Special International Jury Prize - Kutty - J.K. Vishwanathan

2002 National Film Awards (India)

- Won - Silver Lotus Award - Best Child Artist - P. Shwetha
- Won - Silver Lotus Award - Special Jury Award - Director - J.K. Vishwanathan

2002 Gollapudi Srinivas Award

- Won - Best Debutant Director - J.K. Vishwanathan
