= Homesick (2015 film) =

2015 film

- Film poster
- Directed by: Anne Sewitsky
- Written by: Anne Sewitsky
- Starring: Ine Marie Wilmann
- Release dates: 23 January 2015 (Sundance); 27 March 2015 (Norway)
- Running time: 106 minutes
- Country: Norway
- Language: Norwegian

Homesick (Norwegian: De nærmeste) is a 2015 Norwegian drama film directed by Anne Sewitsky. It was selected to be screened in the Contemporary World Cinema section of the 2015 Toronto International Film Festival. It was one of three films shortlisted by Norway to be their submission for the Academy Award for Best Foreign Language Film at the 88th Academy Awards, but it lost out to The Wave.

== Plot ==
Charlotte (Ine Marie Wilmann) and Henrik (Simon J. Berger) are two half-siblings who grew up apart and end up falling in love after meeting for the first time in adulthood.

== Cast ==
- Ine Marie Wilmann as Charlotte
- Simon J. Berger as Henrik
- Anneke von der Lippe as Anna
- Silje Storstein as Marte
- Oddgeir Thune as Dag
- Kari Onstad Winge as Kirsten
- Terje Strømdahl as Bjørn
- Ida Marianne Vassbotn Klasson as Elin
- Oscar Ducasse as Oscar
- Arturo Tovar as Marco
- Anna Dworak as Psykolog
- Hans Rønningen as Erik
- Even Nyhoff as Annas Nye Kjaereste

== See also ==
- Genetic sexual attraction
