= E (2017 film) =

- Theatrical release poster
- Directed by: Kukku Surendran
- Screenplay by: Rohan Bajaj; Hari Kumar K
- Story by: Rohan Bajaj; Amin Surani
- Based on: The Unknown by Rohan Bajaj
- Produced by: Sangeeth Sivan; Amin Surani; Saahil Surani
- Cinematography: Manoj Pillai
- Edited by: Ayub Khan
- Music by: Rahul Raj
- Production company: A.S Productions
- Distributed by: Carnival Motion Pictures Worldwide
- Release date: 18 August 2017
- Country: India
- Language: Malayalam

E is an Indian Malayalam language Supernatural horror film directed by Kukku Surendran starring Gautami Tadimalla in lead role. Produced by Sangeeth Sivan and Amin Surani, the story is written by Rohan Bajaj and Amin Surani. The screenplay has been penned down by Rohan Bajaj and Hari Kumar K. The film's title was announced in January 2016 and principal photography began on 26 March 2017 in Haripad, Kerala. Manoj Pillai handles the cinematography while Rahul Raj composes the original songs and background score. The film released theatrically on 18 August 2017.

== Plot ==
Karthik (Ashiq Ameer), Aru (Meera Nair), Jenny (Kalyani Vidya) and Hari (Balaji Jayarajan) are four friends. Karthik plans on making a documentary on Alzheimer's and visits Alex (Dain Davis) for the same. All five of them go to Karthik's old teacher's tharavadu for the shooting. Karthik's teacher Malathi teacher (Gautami) and her daughter Athira (Nitya Naresh) live a traditional life with temple, music and yoga. Also Athira was Karthik's childhood sweetheart. Malathi teacher has Alzheimer's and is supported by Athira. But after some days of their arrival, they start facing paranormal activities and understand that Malathi teacher is possessed by a spirit named Bhargavan. Jenny receives a book from a box in which a symbol is present. Athira realizes that the symbol is present on the back of her neck and shows it to Karthik proving that she was the third girl who was to be sacrificed by Bhargavan for the process of immortality since the symbol will only be present on the third girl to be sacrificed meaning the first two girls were killed. Then they understand that Bhargavan was killed by Malathi teacher for hypnotizing Athira and trying to sacrifice her in her childhood. To remove Bhargavan's spirit from Malathi they had to find Bhargavan's bones and had to destroy it in fire before Pournami night which was the very same day. They find the bones with the help of Anna's (Elsamma's daughter) paintings. But Bhargavan(Malathi) hypnotizes Anna and brings her for the sacrifice. Before Anna gets killed Karthik burns his bones thus destroying Bhargavan's spirit. The film ends by showing Karthik, Aru, Jenny, Hari and Alex leaving when Malathi teacher asks about when they are going to come again to the tharavadu for the completing the shooting to which Aru replies that they will surely return looking at Karthik and Athira meaning that they have fallen in love.

== Cast ==
- Gautami as Malathi Menon
- Ashiq Ameer as Karthik
- Balaji Jayarajan as Hari
- Dain Davis as Alex
- Kalyani Vidya as Jenny
- Meera Nair P.S as Aru
- Nithya Naresh as Athira
- Anjali Nair as Elsamma
- Sathyajith
- Kalesh
- Hari Kumar K as Mr. Menon
- Adv. Dr. Kriss Venugopal as Bhargavan

== Production ==
Sangeeth Sivan announced the film in early 2017, as a story was developed from a pitch given by his Bollywood writing collaborator Rohan Bajaj. He roped in his former assistant Kukku Surendran as the director, Hari Kumar K as screenwriter, Gautami as the lead actress and Rahul Raj as the composer. Subsequently, Manoj Pillai and Ayoob Khan were signed as the cinematographer and editor respectively.

The filming commenced in March 2017. The film will see several young actors making their debut in Malayalam cinema.

== Soundtrack ==
The film's original background score and songs are composed, arranged and produced by Rahul Raj.

The soundtrack release featured four original songs from the movie. The lyrics for all songs were written by Vinayak Sasikumar.
Tracklist

1. "Pranavaakaaram" - Saritha Ram
2. "Arupathu Maram" - Sunil Mathayi, Vaishakh Ch, Vipin Xavier and Aparna Rajeev
3. "Divaayaanam" - Rahul Raj
4. "Ellake Ellake" -
