= Aparichithan =

2004 Indian film

- Directed by: Sanjeev Sivan
- Screenplay by: Sanjeev Sivan; A. K. Sajan
- Story by: Sanjeev Sivan
- Produced by: Valiyaveettil Siraj
- Starring: Kavya Madhavan; Karthika; Manya
- Cinematography: Santhosh Sivan
- Edited by: A. Sreekar Prasad
- Music by: Suresh Peters
- Distributed by: Valiyaveettil Movie International
- Release date: 16 July 2004
- Running time: 125 minutes
- Country: India
- Language: Malayalam

Aparichithan (transl. The stranger) is a 2004 Indian Malayalam-language supernatural horror film directed by Sanjeev Sivan (in his directorial debut). It stars Mammootty, Kavya Madhavan, Karthika, and Manya. The plot centers around three college students who summon a spirit through a Ouija board. The music was composed by Suresh Peters.

== Plot ==
Aparichithan narrates the story of three carefree college friends - Meenu, Simi, and Devi, known as "Three Roses" – who keep landing in trouble. After one such incident when Devi, the leader of the trio, is caught red-handed trying to steal question papers on the eve of exams, they go underground to avoid facing their peers and families. With the help of Chacko, Simi's fiancée, they arrange accommodation with a woman psychiatrist who is also an expert in "tantrik" mysticism and Ouija board, in an isolated house. Fresh trouble begins there, leading to the landlady chasing the girls out, saying a wandering soul is following them.

The girls get harassed and threatened by their college mate, Jithulal. Chacko accepts the help of his friend, Vinod Varghese, who promises to take them to a guesthouse out in the woods. Vinod actually has an agenda to cheat the girls by bringing them to Jithulal. Their bus meets with an accident, and they are forced to walk along the deserted road through the woods.

They meet a mysterious wildlife photographer and a drunkard, Raghuram. They take shelter at an old bungalow in the forest and have strange experiences. Ram is a nuisance throughout their journey; however, Minu makes good company with him. Ram tells her his stories. He was left only by a younger sister who went missing from Bombay, which made him a drunkard and a psycho. After long treatment, Ram returned to his professional life, and in one of his forest tours, he happened to visit a girl named Kalyani who looked exactly like his sister. He offered to take her to Mumbai and she wholeheartedly agreed. But on the day they planned to leave, she too went missing, and the Aborigines accused Ram of the incident. Ram searched for her throughout the forest, but on the other side of the jungle, she was brutally raped by Jithu Lal. She was burnt alive by Jithulal and his friend, Vinod.

The spirit of the murdered girl follows the three girls. At sunrise, Chacko and Vinod inform the police inspector that Ram is missing, and learn that Ram had already died in the accident they had met with. They return to the forest house, and Minu once again tries using a Ouija board. Ram's spirit comes to them, and they flee the house. They discover that Vinod was cheating them. The soul of Ram follows Vinod and kills him in a marsh. The film ends with Minu back home, noticing activity on the Ouija board again.

== Cast ==
- Mammootty as Raghuram, a wildlife photographer
- Kavya Madhavan as Meenakshi, (voice over by Sreeja Ravi)
- Karthika as Simi, (voice over by Devi S.)
- Manya as Devi, (voice over by Bhagyalakshmi)
- Mahhi Vij as Kalyani
- Vineeth Kumar as Chacko
- Rakesh Varre as Jithulal
- Siraj Musthafa Khan as Vinod Varghese
- Jagathy Sreekumar as Aanamala Joji
- Rajan P. Dev as police officer
- Salim Kumar as tribal helper
- Subair as Santhosh, Meenakshi's elder brother
- Machan Varghese as Watchman Bhaskaran
- Augustine as Cheeru
- Urmila Unni as Tripura Sundari Varma
- Manjulan K. V. as Ponnan
- Poornima Anand as Meenakshi's sister-in-law
- Deepika Mohan as college lecturer/hostel warden

== Soundtrack ==
All the songs were composed by Suresh Peters, with lyrics by Girish Puthenchery. The song "Maasam Maasam" was recorded within 20 minutes.

Track listing
No.	Title	Singer(s)	Length
1.	"Kanavukal"	Srinivas
2.	"Kuyil Paattil"	Sujatha
3.	"Manassukal"	Srinivas, Sheela
4.	"Maasam Maasam"	Jyotsna, Renjini Jose
5.	"Pranaya Gopura"	Sujatha, Srinivas

== See also ==
- List of Malayalam horror films
