= Yagam (1982 film) =

- Directed by: Sivan
- Written by: N. Mohanan; K. S. Namboothiri (dialogues)
- Screenplay by: K. S. Namboothiri
- Based on: Kathatha Karthikavilakku by N. Mohanan
- Produced by: Sivan
- Starring: Kalpana; Aranmula Ponnamma; Babu Namboothiri; Jalaja
- Cinematography: Sivan, Mahesh
- Edited by: NP Suresh
- Music by: M. G. Radhakrishnan
- Production company: Saritha Films
- Distributed by: Saritha Films
- Release date: 12 February 1982
- Country: India
- Language: Malayalam

Yagam is a 1982 Indian Malayalam film, directed and produced by Sivan. The film stars Kalpana, Aranmula Ponnamma, Babu Namboothiri and Jalaja in the lead roles. The film has musical score by M. G. Radhakrishnan. The film won the National Film Award for Best Feature Film in Malayalam. O. N. V. Kurup won the Kerala State Film Award for Best Lyrics for the song "Shravana Sandhyathan". Sivan and Mahesh won the Kerala State Film Award for Best Photography (black-and-white).

== Cast ==
- Kalpana
- Aranmula Ponnamma
- Babu Namboothiri
- Jalaja
- Premji

== Soundtrack ==
The music was composed by M. G. Radhakrishnan and the lyrics were written by O. N. V. Kurup.

No.	Song	Singers	Lyrics	Length (m:ss)
1	"Sraavana Sandhyathan"	P. Susheeladevi	O. N. V. Kurup	
