= Anne Sewitsky =

Norwegian film director (born 1978)

- Born: 12 January 1978; Oslo
- Occupation: Film director

Anne Sewitsky (born 12 January 1978) is a Norwegian film director. Her 2010 film Happy, Happy was selected as the Norwegian entry for the Best Foreign Language Film at the 84th Academy Awards, but did not make the final shortlist. In 2015, her film Homesick was one of three films shortlisted by Norway to be their submission for the Academy Award for Best Foreign Language Film at the 88th Academy Awards, but it lost out to The Wave.

In 2019, she directed the Black Mirror episode "Rachel, Jack and Ashley Too"; and the episodes "Ties That Bind" and "The Laughing Place" from the TV series Castle Rock.

== Filmography ==
Film

- Happy, Happy (2010)
- Totally True Love (2011)
- Homesick (2015)

Television

Year	Title	Director	Writer	Creator	Executive Producer	Notes
2008	Himmelblå	Yes (4)	Yes (1)	No	No	
2011	Koselig med peis	Yes (3)	No	No	No	Miniseries
2012–16	Helt perfekt	Yes (7)	No	No	No	
2017	Monster	Yes (4)	Yes (7)	Yes	No	
2019	Black Mirror	Yes (1)	No	No	No	Episode: "Rachel, Jack and Ashley Too"
2019	Castle Rock	Yes (2)	No	No	No	
2020	Monsterland	Yes (1)	No	No	Yes	Episode: Port Funchon, LA"
2021	A Very British Scandal	Yes (3)	No	No	Yes	Miniseries
2024	Presumed Innocent	Yes (3)	No	No	Yes	
2026	The Murder of JonBenét Ramsey	Yes	No	No	Yes	Miniseries
