= Utpal K. Banerjee =

Indian writer, adviser on management and information technology

- Born: India
- Occupation(s): Writer; Management expert IT adviser
- Awards: Padma Shri

Utpal K. Banerjee is an Indian writer, adviser on management and information technology and a former director of the New Delhi–based Forum for Information Technology for India.

== Early life ==
After graduating in Pure Physics with honours from the University of Calcutta in 1955, he studied at the University of Manchester on a Commonwealth scholarship to secure his doctoral degree (PhD) in 1972. He worked in various positions in a number of Government of India agencies before holding positions in the corporate sector such as those of the Chief of Management Services at Tata Steel, the director of Computer Division at the Administrative Staff College of India, the senior executive director at Electronics India and the director general of the All India Management Association.

He has served Jawaharlal Nehru University, International Management Institute, New Delhi, Fore School of Management, and the Management Development Institute as a visiting faculty of management studies. He has published several books on Management, Information Technology, and Indian culture, including Luminous Harmony: Indian Art and Culture, Millennium Glimpses of Indian Performing Arts, Indian Puppets, and Information Technology for Common Man. The Government of India awarded him the fourth highest civilian honour of the Padma Shri, in 2009, for his contributions to Literature and Education.
