= Totally True Love =

- Totally True Love (2011)
- Directed by: Anne Sewitsky
- Screenplay by: Kamilla Krogsveen
- Based on: Jørgen Anne er Sant by Vigdis Hjorth
- Produced by: Tanya Badendyck; Silje Hopland; Teréz Hollo
- Cinematography: Anna Myking
- Music by: Pedro Marques; Marcel Noll
- Production companies: Cinenord Spillefilm; Film Fund FUZZ
- Release date: 25 February 2011
- Running time: 83 minutes
- Country: Norway
- Languages: Norwegian; English
- Budget: NOK 18,000,000

Totally True Love, also known as Jørgen + Anne er Sant, is a 2011 Norwegian film based on the 1984 novel Jørgen Anne er Sant by Vigdis Hjorth.

== Plot ==
The story starts with a 10-year-old girl, Anne, she was a little different from everyone in her class, when every girl dressed up like a princess, she always dressed up like a soldier. Anne also had a bestfriend named Beate and she was quite opposite of Anne. While Beate believed in love and had good grades, Anne believed love was gross and never had good grades. Beate had a huge crush on a guy named Elinar. In their class there was rumor about a girl named Helga, the rumor was that she loved a boy named Lucas, but there was a girl who liked Lucas and he liked her back, growing jealous of her Helga cut that girl's hair and ran away. One time she kissed Lucas when he was asleep, he woke up screaming, so she ran and jumped off a cliff into the river. Rumor was that after her father found her body he buried her inside a wall of a house where Jorgen moved. Anne's brother, Ole was the one who said that he saw Helga's spirit, so everyone believed that rumor. Anne had never been in love, so she found Helga quite stupid to take her life over a boy, but this was until she met Jorgen. She fell for him after she saw his photo album, but she was afraid that Ellen, a popular girl in class would steal him before she does. Beate and Anne comes up with an idea, Beate calls Ellen's friend over to her house, hiding Anne in her bedroom. Beate smartly makes her blurt all Ellen's secrets.

They get to know that Ellen was going to write a love letter to Jorgen. So Anne wrote a letter to Ellen pretending to be written by Jorgen, that he wants her to be his girlfriend. Ellen writes him back and agrees, but that letter never gets to Jorgen. In the meantime, all children have a bike race in the field, where girls have to sit at back of boy's bicycle. Jorgen asks Anne to sit with him, much to Ellen's annoyance. They go too far and have a romantic drive, feeling confident after that Anne decides to write Jorgen a love letter. During swimming lessons, Anne asks Jorgen to be her boyfriend by putting the letter in his bag. Anne also asks Elinar to be Beate's boyfriend and he eventually agrees to that. Later Jorgen gives Anne a letter, which makes her smile. Happily Anne dresses up and goes to Ellen's birthday party, while singing the birthday song, Jorgen was only looking at Anne, growing jealous Ellen asks everyone to play a game of truth and dare. The first spin arrives at Knut who was asked that did he love someone and he said that it was Ellen, next spin arrives on Elinar, he was asked the same question and he says Beate's name, after another spin bottle lands on Anne. She chooses dare and was given a dare that she have to kiss Jorgen, they both kiss each other. Ellen trying to stop the kiss, asks Anne about the book she had in her purse and asks her to hand it over.

They get into a fight with each other, when Beate blurts out that the diary is filled with all her secrets. Growing angry Anne leaves the place, Jorgen follows her and they had a romantic moment, Anne gives him a bottle as a present and agrees to be his girlfriend. At school Ellen secretly takes Anne's diary and reads out the letter Anne wrote as Jorgen in front of everyone. Jorgen gives Anne her bottle back, angry Anne confronts Beate that if she had not said that the diary has her secrets this would not have happened, insulting her about being ugly and still wetting the bed. Later at the school Anne beats Ellen up when Ellen said that Jorgen was coming to her house. Coming back home, still worried, she goes over to Ellen's house, where she cuts Ellen's hair which is seen by Jorgen, afraid she ran away followed by Ellen and Jorgen. Ole later finds Anne sitting inside a bush refusing to go because she thinks she too will be buried inside a wall like Helga, Ole comforts her saying that the story is not true and he never saw Helga's spirit. After coming home her mother explains to her that mistakes does not define a person's personality, but what you do after making them is what you truly are. Inspired by her words Anne makes up with Beate and while leaving her house, Beate's grandmother says that she finds her old self in Anne.

Then she goes over at Jorgen's and asks for forgiveness, he says that he likes her and wants to show her something, he then breaks the wall with a hammer where according to the rumor lies Helga's dead body. It turns out that the wall was not hiding any body inside it and Helga was saved by her father and still loved Lucas. It is later revealed that, Beate's grandmother is Helga, also Ellen was now dating Knut. In the epilogue Anne says that never be fooled by elders when they say love is not real at the age of 10, because it is totally true love.
