= Yuddham (2014 film) =

- Film poster
- Directed by: Bharathi Ganesh
- Produced by: Natti Kumar
- Starring: Tarun; Yami Gautam; Srihari
- Cinematography: Jaswanth
- Music by: Chakri
- Distributed by: Vishakha Talkies
- Release date: 14 March 2014
- Country: India
- Language: Telugu

Yuddham (transl. War) is a 2014 Indian Telugu language drama film directed by Bharathi Ganesh. The film stars Tarun and Yami Gautam. The film also features late Srihari and was released as a tribute to him as he played a pivotal role in it. The film was released in 550 screens, the highest in Tarun's career.

== Cast ==
- Tarun as Rishi
- Yami Gautam as Madhumita
- Srihari as Shankar Anna
- Nagineedu as Naidu
- Rao Ramesh as Sivaji
- Brahmanandam as Nandagopal / Nandu
- Ali as Rama Rao
- Chalapathi Rao as Krishnam Raju
- Giri Babu as Rama Chandra Murthy
- Chandra Mohan as Chandram, Rishi's father
- Sudha as Rajyalakshmi, Rishi's mother
- Duvvasi Mohan as Duvvasi
- Krishna Bhagawan as Akuvakkala Ananda Rao
- Sayaji Shinde as Ramchandra
- Apoorva as Sweety
- Venu Madhav as Seenu
- Ashish Vidyarthi as CBI Officer SP Mallikarjuna Rao
- Kota Srinivasa Rao as Lakshmi Narayana
- Bhupal as Rishi's brother

== Production ==
This film marks Bharathi Ganesh's second film after Amayakudu (2011). Producer Natti Kumar was not happy when Tarun refused for a five day trip to Bangkok to finish the shoot of this film.

== Soundtrack ==
Music was composed by Chakri. Album consists of 5 songs.

No.	Title	Singer(s)	Length
1.	"Athadoka Sainyam"	Noel Sean, Sravana Bhargavi
2.	"Anthenduku Nuvvu"	Simha, Sudheeksha Katiyala
3.	"Emaindi Darlingu"	Revanth, Sahithi
4.	"Chichu Pedthondi"	Chakri, Adarshini
5.	"Lover Boy"	Vasu, Surabhi Sravani
