= Sivan (cinematographer) =

Indian cinematographer (1932–2021)

- Born: Sivasankaran Nair; 14 May 1932; Haripad, Travancore (present-day Alappuzha district, Kerala, India)
- Died: 24 June 2021 (aged 89); Thiruvananthapuram, Kerala, India
- Occupations: Cinematographer; director
- Known for: Yagam (1982); Abhayam (1991); Kochu Kochu Mohangal (1998); Oru Yathra (1999); Kilivathil (2008); Keshu (2009)
- Spouse: Chandramani
- Children: Santosh Sivan; Sanjeev Sivan; Sangeeth Sivan
- Parents: Gopalapillai (father); Bhavaniamma (mother)

Sivasankaran Nair, popularly known as Sivan (14 May 1932 – 24 June 2021) was an Indian cinematographer and film director known for his works in Malayalam cinema. Sivan won the national film award three times. He was the first government press photographer in Travancore and Thiru-Kochi. He was the father of Sangeeth Sivan, Santhosh Sivan and Sanjeev Sivan.

Sivan was the still photographer for national award-winning Malayalam film Chemmeen (1966).

His debut as a producer was with Swapnam (1972), for which he also served as the still photographer. Some of his popular films are Abhayam (1991), Yagam (1982), Oru Yathra (1999), Keshu (2009), Kochu Kochu Mohangal (1998) and Kilivathil (2008). He received the Kerala State Award for Best Cinematography (black & white) for Yagam.

The documentary "Mohiniyattam Through the Ages" (1990), directed by Sivan, won the National Award for Best Non-Feature Film Cinematography, which was awarded to Santosh Sivan. It also received the Kerala State Film Award for Best Documentary in 1990.

== Early life ==
Sivan was the second among the six children of Padeettathil Gopalapillai and Bhavaniamma and was born in Harippad. His full name was Sivasankaran Nair.

== Death ==
Sivan died on 24 June 2021 at the age of 89 due to cardiac arrest at his house in Thiruvananthapuram.
