= Ale Kino! International Young Audience Film Festival =

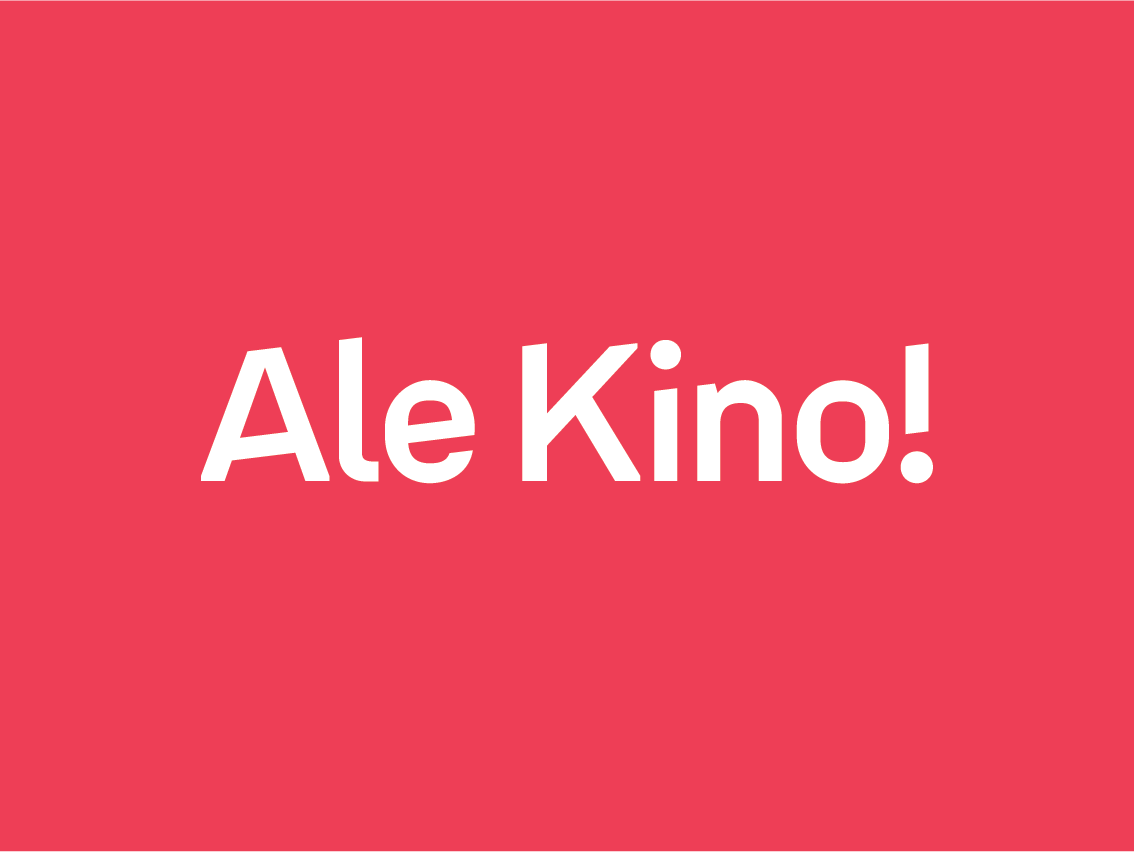
- Location: Poznań, Poland
- Founded: 1969
- Website: www.alekino.com

Ale Kino! International Young Audience Film Festival is an international movie event held in Poznań in Poland since 1969. The festival focuses on more ambitious cinema addressed to children and young people. The main organizer of the festival is Children's Art Center in Poznań.

== History ==
The festival's roots go back to local reviews of animation and children's films organised in Poznań since 1963. In 1969 it became a national and soon an international children's cinema and television competition, held every two years (later, every four years) during winter holidays for schools. A theme song in the 1980s was "Czekamy na filmy" sung by children band from Poznań; Łejery.

It became formally a festival in 1994; since 1995 under the auspices of International Centre of Films for Children and Young People.

Until 2005 it took place in June. In 2006, it was moved to December and has been held then ever since.

The festival is divided in two sections: national and international. The movies are judged by a professional jury, children's jury and youths' jury in different categories (feature movies and short movies; for children and youths). Each of them assigning separate awards.

Since 2002 a non-competitive part, of an informative character is held, as well.

Since 2015, the Festival has been accompanied by AleKinomaniacs – characters created by Jan Kallwejt.

== Awards ==
- Professional Jury
  - Golden Poznań Goats
  - Silver Poznań Goats
  - Platinum Poznań Goats
  - European Children's Film Association Award
  - Polish Filmmakers Association Award
- Youths' Jury
  - Marcin Award
- Children's Jury
  - Marcinek Award
- other:
  - Teachers' Award
  - Audience Award
  - Honorable Mentions
  - Soccer Goats

and other occasional.

Golden Poznan Goats is the main festival award given to the best feature movies and short movies, in both cases separately for children's and youth's movies. In some years feature movies are divided into two additional categories – actor movies and animation movies. Occasionally Silver Poznan Goats, meaning "second place" and Bronze Poznan Goats or Poznan Goats, as the third, were admitted. In earlier years the awards were given in national and international competition, as well as in specific categories, like best actor, best music and others. Judges deciding on the winners are professional filmmakers from all over the world. Platinum Poznan Goats is awarded to the people who made a special contribution to children's media and filmography.

Marcin and Marcinek are awards admitted by young viewers to the best feature and short movies. The judges are students of Poznań schools. Marcin is admitted by the youth, while Marcinek by children.

== Assignments ==
=== Golden Poznan Goats for Best Children's Feature Movie ===
| Edition / Year | English title | Original title | Director | Ref |
|---|---|---|---|---|
| 33 (2015) | How to Steal a Dog | Gae-leul hoom-chi-neun wan-byeok-han bang-beob | Sung-ho Kim | |
| 32 (2014) | Beyond Beyond | Resan till Fjäderkungens rike | Esben Toft Jacobsen | |
| 31 (2013) | The Rocket | Bang Fai | Kim Mordaunt | |
| 30 (2012) | The War of the Buttons | La guerre des boutons | Yann Samuell | |
| 29 (2011) | Totally True Love | Jørgen + Anne = Sant | Anne Sewitsky | |
| 28 (2010) | The Children of Diyarbakir | Min Dit | Miraz Bezar | |
| 27 (2009) | It's Not Me, I Swear! | C'est pas moi, je le jure! | Philippe Falardeau | |
| 26 (2008) | Kid Svensk | Kid Svensk | Nanna Huolman | |
| 25 (2007) | ? | ? | ? | |

=== Golden Poznan Goats for Best Youths' Feature Movie ===
| Edition / Year | English title | Original title | Director | Ref |
|---|---|---|---|---|
| 33 (2015) | Flocking | Flocken | Beata Gårdeler | |
| 32 (2014) | The Voice of the Voiceless | La voz de los silenciados | Maximón Monihan | |
| 31 (2013) | In Bloom | Grdzelt Nateli Ddeebi | Nana Ekvtimishvili, Simon Gross | |
| 30 (2012) | Identity Card | Obcansky prukaz | Ondrej Trojan | |
| 29 (2011) | Breathing | Atmen | Karl Markovics | |
| 28 (2010) | The Be All And End All | The Be All And End All | Bruce Webb | |
| 27 (2009) | Accidents Happen | Accidents Happen | Andrew Lancaster | |
| 26 (2008) | The Class | Klass | Ilmar Raag | |
| 25 (2007) | ? | ? | ? | |

=== Golden Poznan Goats for Best Feature Movie ===
| Edition / Year | English title | Original title | Director | Ref |
|---|---|---|---|---|
| 24 (2006) | Opal Dream | Opal Dream | Peter Cattaneo | |
| 23 (2005) | The Italian | Italyanets | Andrey Kravchuk | |
| 22 (2004) | Polleke | Polleke | Ineke Houtman | |
| 21 (2003) | Someone Like Hodder | En som Hodder | Henrik Ruben Genz | |

=== Golden Poznan Goats for Best International Feature Movie ===
| Edition / Year | English title | Original title | Director | Ref |
|---|---|---|---|---|
| 20 (2002) | A Handful of Grass | Eine Hand Voll Gras | Roland Suso Richter | |
| 19 (2001) | There’s Only One Jimmy Grimble | There’s Only One Jimmy Grimble | John Hay | |
| 18 (2000) | Scratches in the Table | Madelief: Krassen in het tafelblad | Ineke Houtman | |
| 17 (1999) | ? | ? | ? | |
| 16 (1998) | The King of Masks | Bian Lian | Tian-Ming Wu | |

== See also ==
- Poznań Goats
