= Sangeeth Sivan =

Indian film director and screenwriter (1958/1959 – 2024)

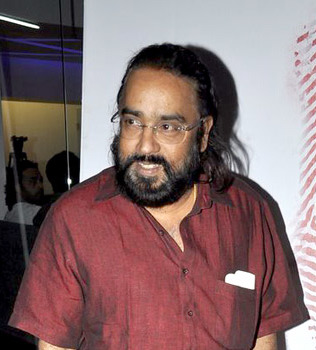
- Sivan at the screening of Inam
- Born: 1958/59; Thiruvananthapuram, Kerala, India
- Died: 8 May 2024 (aged 65); Mumbai, Maharashtra, India
- Occupations: Director, screenwriter
- Known for: Vyooham; Yodha; Nirnayam; Kyaa Kool Hai Hum; Apna Sapna Money Money; Yamla Pagla Deewana 2
- Parent: Sivan (father)
- Relatives: Santosh Sivan (brother); Sanjeev Sivan (brother)

Sangeeth Sivan (1958/59 – 8 May 2024) was an Indian film director and screenwriter who worked in Malayalam and Hindi film industries.

He is best known for directing Vyooham (1990), Yodha (1992), Kyaa Kool Hai Hum (2005), Apna Sapna Money Money (2006), and Yamla Pagla Deewana 2 (2013).

== Career ==
Sangeeth started his career when Basu Bhattacharya brought him on board as the executive producer of his son's directorial debut Raakh, starring Aamir Khan and Pankaj Kapur. He soon made his directorial debut with the successful Malayalam film Vyooham starring Raghuvaran. His second directorial Yodha gave him nationwide recognition. After directing more than half a dozen Malayalam films, he directed his first Bollywood film, Zor, starring Sunny Deol. The film did not do well at the box office, but the directorial ability of Sangeeth was appreciated by many producers. After a brief gap he started working on Jackie Shroff's film Sandhya, followed by Pantaloon's Chura Liyaa Hai Tumne.

Sangeeth collaborated with Mohanlal in three films, namely Yodha, Gandharvam and Nirnayam.

In 2012, Sangeeth went to the United Kingdom to direct the comedy Yamla Pagla Deewana 2 along with the Deol family.

== Death ==
Sangeeth died on 8 May 2024, at the age of 65, following a cardiac arrest.

He was directing Kapkapiii, the Hindi remake of the Malayalam film Romancham, at the time of his death.

== Filmography ==
=== Films ===
Year	Title	Language	Credited as			Notes
Year	Title	Language	Director	Writer	Producer	Notes
1989	Raakh	Hindi	✗	✗	✓	As Executive producer
1990	Vyooham	Malayalam	✓	✓	✗	Directorial Debut
1992	Yodha	Malayalam	✓	✓	✗	
1992	Daddy	Malayalam	✓	✗	✗	
1993	Gandharvam	Malayalam	✓	✓	✗	
1993	Johnny	Malayalam	✓	✓	✗	Winner, Kerala State Film Award for Best Children's Film
1995	Nirnayam	Malayalam	✓	✓	✗	
1998	Zor	Hindi	✓	✗	✗	
2000	Snehapoorvam Anna	Malayalam	✓	✗	✗	
2003	Chura Liyaa Hai Tumne	Hindi	✓	✗	✗	
2005	Kyaa Kool Hai Hum	Hindi	✓	✗	✗	
2006	Apna Sapna Money Money	Hindi	✓	✗	✗	
2009	Ek – The Power of One	Hindi	✓	✗	✗	Official remake of Telugu film Athadu
2010	Click	Hindi	✓	✗	✓	
2012	Idiots	Malayalam	✗	✓	✓	
2013	Yamla Pagla Deewana 2	Hindi	✓	✗	✗	
2017	E	Malayalam	✗	✗	✓	
2019	Bhram	Hindi	✓	✗	✓	ZEE5 original series
2025	Kapkapiii	Hindi	✓	✗	✗	Remake of Romancham; Posthumous release
2026	Blind Game	Hindi	✓	✗	✗	Posthumous release
