= Santosh Sivan =

Indian cinematographer

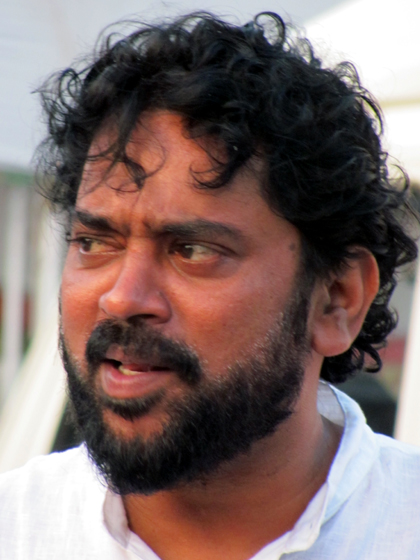
- Santosh in 2011
- Born: 8 February 1964 (age 62); Trivandrum, Kerala, India
- Education: Film and Television Institute of India, Pune; Mar Ivanios College, Thiruvananthapuram; Loyola School, Thiruvananthapuram
- Occupations: Cinematographer; film director; actor; film producer
- Spouse: Deepa (m. 1993)
- Children: Sarvajith
- Relatives: Sivan (father); Sangeeth Sivan (brother); Sanjeev Sivan (brother)

Santosh Sivan ISC (born 8 February 1964) is an Indian cinematographer, film director, producer and actor known for his works in Malayalam, Tamil and Hindi cinema. Santosh graduated from the Film and Television Institute of India and has, to date, completed 55 feature films and 50 documentaries. He is regarded as one of India's finest and best cinematographers. He is the recipient of the Pierre Angénieux Excellens in Cinematography, twelve National Film Awards, six Filmfare Awards, four Kerala State Film Awards, and three Tamil Nadu State Film Awards.

== Career ==
Santosh, a founding member of the Indian Society of Cinematographers and the most awarded Director of Photography in India, graduated from the Film and Television Institute of India and completed 45 feature films and 41 documentaries.

As a director, Santosh won his first National Award 1988 for the Story of Tiblu (1988). His film Halo was honoured at the 43rd National Film Awards as the Best Children's Film and Best Sound.

Santosh became the first cinematographer in the Asia-Pacific region to join the American Society of Cinematographers. As a cinematographer, he has won five National Film Awards – including four for Best Feature Film Cinematography. As of 2014, he has received eleven National Film Awards, and 21 international awards for his works. He was awarded the Padma Shri in 2014 for his contributions to Indian cinema.

In an interview, he said that some films he chose, not mostly because of the story but due to the very fact that he was comfortable with the director, a bigger pay check and out of friendship.

=== Documentary ===
His 2007 release Prarambha won the National Film Award for Best Educational/Motivational/Instructional Film at the 55th National Film Awards.

== Filmography ==
Key
†	Denotes films that have not yet been released

Year	Film	Director	Producer	Cinematographer	Writer	Language	Notes
1986	Nidhiyude Katha			Yes		Malayalam	
1986	Oru Maymasa Pulariyil			Yes		Malayalam	
1988	Story of Tiblu	Yes				Idu Mishmi	National Film Award for Best Short Fiction Film
1988	David David Mr. David			Yes		Malayalam	
1989	New Year			Yes		Malayalam	
1989	Raakh			Yes		Hindi	
1990	Varthamanakaalam			Yes		Malayalam	
1990	Midhya			Yes		Malayalam	
1990	Indrajaalam			Yes		Malayalam	
1990	Sunday 7 PM			Yes		Malayalam	
1990	Dr. Pasupathy			Yes		Malayalam	
1990	No.20 Madras Mail			Yes		Malayalam	Second Unit Cameraman
1990	Appu			Yes		Malayalam	Shot first schedule
1991	Perumthachan			Yes		Malayalam	National Film Award for Best Cinematography
1991	Thalapathi			Yes		Tamil	
1992	Roja			Yes		Tamil	Tamil Nadu State Film Award for Best Cinematographer
1992	Aham			Yes		Malayalam	Kerala State Film Award for Best Cinematography
1992	Yodha			Yes		Malayalam	
1993	Gardish			Yes		Hindi	
1993	Gandharvam			Yes		Malayalam	
1994	Pavithram			Yes		Malayalam	
1995	Nirnayam			Yes		Malayalam	
1995	Barsaat			Yes		Hindi	Filmfare Award for Best Cinematography
1995	Indira			Yes		Tamil	Tamil Nadu State Film Award for Best Cinematographer
1996	Kalapani			Yes		Malayalam	National Film Award for Best Cinematography; Kerala State Film Award for Best Cinematography
1996	Halo	Yes		Yes	Yes	Hindi	National Film Award for Best Children's Film
1997	Iruvar			Yes		Tamil	National Film Award for Best Cinematography; Filmfare Award for Best Cinematographer – Tamil
1997	Darmiyan			Yes		Hindi	
1998	Dil Se..			Yes		Hindi	National Film Award for Best Cinematography; Filmfare Award for Best Cinematography
1998	The Terrorist	Yes			Yes	Tamil	National Film Award for Best Feature Film in Tamil
1998	Malli	Yes	Yes	Yes	Yes	Tamil	National Film Award for Best Film on Environment Conservation/Preservation
1999	Vanaprastham			Yes		Malayalam	Filmfare Award for Best Cinematography – Malayalam
2000	Phir Bhi Dil Hai Hindustani			Yes		Hindi	
2000	Pukar			Yes		Hindi	
2000	Fiza			Yes		Hindi	
2001	Asoka	Yes		Yes	Yes	Hindi	Filmfare Award for Best Cinematography
2003	Tehzeeb			Yes		Hindi	
2004	Meenaxi: A Tale of Three Cities			Yes		Hindi	Zee Cine Award for Best Cinematography
2004	Aparichithan			Yes		Malayalam	
2004	Bride and Prejudice			Yes		English	
2005	Anandabhadram	Yes		Yes		Malayalam	Kerala State Film Award for Best Cinematography
2005	Navarasa	Yes		Yes	Yes	Tamil	National Film Award for Best Feature Film in Tamil
2005	The Mistress of Spices			Yes		English	
2007	Prarambha	Yes				Kannada	short film National Film Award for Best Educational/Motivational/Instructional Film
2007	Before the Rains	Yes	Yes	Yes		English; Malayalam	
2008	Tahaan	Yes			Yes	Hindi	Best feature film award, CIFEJ Award (Centre International du Film pour l' Enfant et la Jeunesse); UNICEF Award at 11th Olympia International Film Festival for Children and Young People, Greece
2010	Raavan			Yes		Hindi	
2010	Raavanan			Yes		Tamil	
2011	Varnam		Yes			Tamil	
2011	Urumi	Yes	Yes	Yes		Malayalam	Best Director at the Imagine India International Film Festival, Madrid
2011	Indian Rupee		Yes			Malayalam	National Film Award for Best Feature Film in Malayalam
2012	Thuppakki			Yes		Tamil	
2013	Rangrezz			Yes		Hindi	
2013	Ceylon	Yes	Yes	Yes	Yes	English	
2014	Inam	Yes	Yes	Yes	Yes	Tamil	
2014	Anjaan			Yes		Tamil	
2017	The Great Father		Yes			Malayalam	
2017	Spyder			Yes		Telugu; Tamil	Debut in Telugu cinema.
2018	Chekka Chivantha Vaanam			Yes		Tamil	
2020	Darbar			Yes		Tamil	
2022	Jack N' Jill	Yes		Yes		Malayalam	
2023	Mumbaikar	Yes		Yes		Hindi	
2024	Olavum Theeravum			Yes		Malayalam	Part of the anthology series Manorathangal
2024	Abhayam Thedi Veendum	Yes		Yes		Malayalam	Part of the anthology series Manorathangal
2024	Barroz			Yes		Malayalam	
2026	Raja Shivaji			Yes		Marathi; Hindi	Bilingual film Also debut in Marathi cinema.
2026	Batwara 1947			Yes		Hindi	
2026	Moha †	Yes	Yes	Yes	Yes	English	Official selection for International film festival rotterdam 2023

=== As actor ===
Year	Film	Role	Language	Notes
2011	Makaramanju	Raja Ravi Varma	Malayalam	
2012	Thuppakki	himself	Tamil	Special appearance in the song "Google Google"

== Awards ==
Year	Award	Award Category	Notes	Ref.
2014	Civilian honours	Padma Shri	Art - Film	

=== National Film Awards ===
Year	Film	Language	Category	Notes
1988	Story of Tiblu	English	National Film Award for Best Short Fiction Film	Short film director
1990	Perumthachan	Malayalam	National Film Award for Best Cinematography	
1991	Mohiniyattam	Malayalam	National Film Award for Best Non-Feature Film Cinematography	Short film
1995	Kalapani	Malayalam	National Film Award for Best Cinematography	
1996	Halo	Hindi	National Film Award for Best Children's Film	Director
1998	The Terrorist	Tamil	National Film Award for Best Feature Film in Tamil	Director
1998	Malli	Tamil	National Film Award for Best Film on Environment Conservation/Preservation	Director
1997	Iruvar	Tamil	National Film Award for Best Cinematography	
1998	Dil Se..	Hindi	National Film Award for Best Cinematography	
2004	Navarasa	Tamil	National Film Award for Best Feature Film in Tamil	Director
2008	Prarambha	Kannada	National Film Award for Best Educational/Motivational/Instructional Film	Short film
2011	Indian Rupee	Malayalam	National Film Award for Best Feature Film in Malayalam	Co-producer

==== Kerala State Film Awards ====
- 1992 – Aham – Best Cinematography (Colour)
- 1996 – Kalapani – Best Cinematography
- 2005 – Anandabhadram – Best Cinematography

==== Tamil Nadu State Film Awards ====
- 1992 – Roja – Best Cinematography
- 1996 – Indira – Best Cinematography
- 2010 – Raavanan – Best Cinematography

==== Filmfare Awards ====
- 1995 – Barsaat – Best Cinematography
- 1998 – Dil Se.. – Best Cinematography
- 2000 – Halo – Best Film (Critics)
- 2001 – Asoka – Best Cinematography

==== Filmfare Awards South ====
- 1997 – Iruvar – Best Cinematographer – South
- 1999 – Vanaprastham – Best Cinematographer – South

==== IIFA Awards ====
- 2002 – Asoka – IFFA Best Cinematographer Award

==== Star Screen Awards ====
- 2005 – Meenaxi: A Tale of Three Cities – Best Cinematography

==== Zee Cine Awards ====
- 2005 – Meenaxi: A Tale of Three Cities – Best Cinematography

=== International ===
Won:

- 1998 – The Terrorist – Best Director at Cairo International Film Festival
- 1998 – The Terrorist – Golden Pyramid at Cairo International Film Festival
- 1999 – Malli – Adult's Jury Award for Feature Film and Video (second place) at Chicago International Film Festival
- 1999 – The Terrorist – Grand Jury Prize at Cinemanila International Film Festival
- 1999 – The Terrorist – Lino Brocka Award for Best Film at Cinemanila International Film Festival
- 2000 – Malli– Poznan Goat for Best Director at 18th Ale Kino! International Young Audience Film Festival
- 2000 – The Terrorist – Panorama Jury Prize for Honorable Mention at Sarajevo Film Festival
- 2000 – Malli – Emerging Masters Showcase Award at Seattle International Film Festival Awards
- 2004 – Malli – Audience Award for Best Feature Film at Indian Film Festival of Los Angeles
- 2005 – Navarasa – Monaco International Film Festival (Monaco)
  - Won – Best Supporting Actor – Bobby Darling
  - Won – Angel Independent Spirit Award – Navarasa – Santosh Sivan
- 2008 – Before the Rains – Grand Award for Best Theatrical Feature at WorldFest Houston International Film Festival
- 2008 – Before the Rains – Crystal Kodak award for best cinematography.
- 2009 – Tahaan won a High Commendation in Children's Feature Film section at the 2009 Asia Pacific Screen Awards

Nominated:

- 2001 – The Terrorist – Independent Spirit Award for Best Foreign Film
- 2001 – The Terrorist – Phoenix Film Critics Society Award for Best Foreign Language Film
