= Divya Dutta =

Indian actress (born 1977)

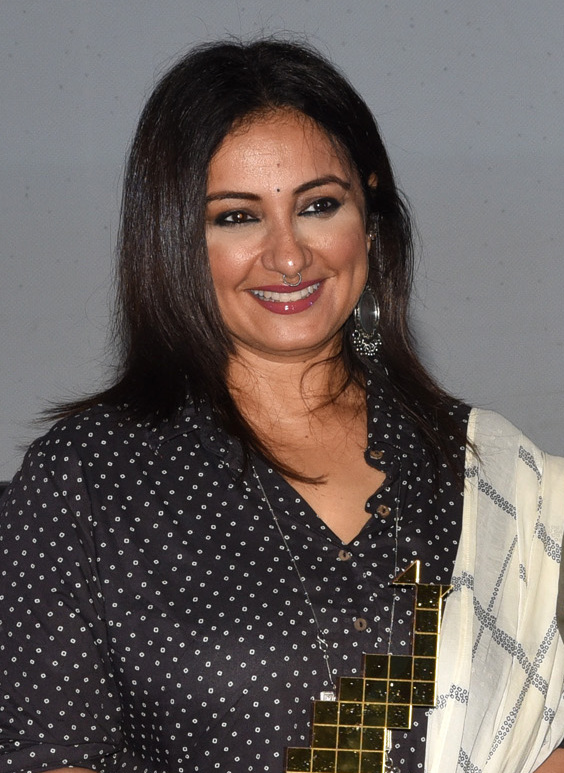
- Dutta in 2018
- Born: 25 September 1977 (age 49); Ludhiana, Punjab, India
- Occupation: Actress
- Years active: 1994–present
- Relatives: Deepak Bahry (uncle)
- Website: divyadutta.co.in

Divya Dutta (born 25 September 1977) is an Indian actress. She has appeared primarily in Hindi and Punjabi cinema, and has received accolades including a National Film Award and a Filmfare OTT Award.

Dutta debuted in Hindi cinema in 1994 with the film Ishq Mein Jeena Ishq Mein Marna, which she followed with a lead role in the 1995 drama Veergati. She garnered attention for playing the lead role of Zainab, a Muslim wife separated from her Sikh husband, in the 1999 Punjabi film Shaheed-e-Mohabbat Boota Singh, set against the backdrop of the 1947 Partition of India. Dutta gained further attention for her supporting roles in the romantic drama Veer-Zaara (2004), the comedy Welcome to Sajjanpur (2008), the dramas Delhi-6 (2009), Stanley Ka Dabba (2011) and Heroine (2012), and the thriller Badlapur (2015). In 2013, she gained acclaim for playing the sister of Milkha Singh in the biopic Bhaag Milkha Bhaag. For her role in the social drama Irada (2017), Dutta was awarded the National Film Award for Best Supporting Actress.

In television, she played Purnima Banerjee in the serial Samvidhaan (2014). She won a Filmfare OTT Award for her performance in the thriller series Special OPS (2020). She has also authored a book, The Stars in My Sky.

== Early life ==
Dutta was born on 25 September 1977 in Ludhiana, Punjab. Her mother, Nalini Dutta, was a government officer and doctor who raised Dutta and her brother single-handedly following the death of her husband when Dutta was aged seven. Dutta described her as "fearless and professional" and a "fun mom at home." She took inspiration from her mother for her role as a single mother, Pappi in the 2013 drama film Gippi. She and her brother compiled a collection of their mother's poems and published them as a present to her. Dutta's maternal uncle is film director and producer Deepak Bahry.

When Dutta was young, the Punjab insurgency began and Dutta described herself as hiding behind her mother's dupatta "praying nobody shoots us." Dutta was educated at Sacred Heart Convent in Ludhiana.

== Career ==
=== 1994–2003: Early work and breakthrough in Punjabi films ===
Dutta made her film debut in 1994 with the film Ishq Mein Jeena Ishq Mein Marna. She followed this by playing the supporting role of Bindiya in the 1995 film Surakshaa, alongside Suniel Shetty, Aditya Pancholi, Saif Ali Khan and Sheeba. The film performed very well in the overseas markets, especially Norway and Sweden. The same year, Dutta earned her first leading role opposite Salman Khan in the 1995 drama film Veergati, portraying the role of Sandhya. However, the film became a flop at the box office.

The following year, Dutta played supporting roles in three releases- Agni Sakshi alongside Jackie Shroff, Nana Patekar and Manisha Koirala, Chhote Sarkar alongside Govinda and Shilpa Shetty, and Ram Aur Shyam. In 1997, she played small roles in Raja Ki Aayegi Baraat, alongside Rani Mukerji, as Sharda's sister and in Daava as Deepa, alongside Akshay Kumar and Raveena Tandon. Dutta had four releases in 1998, playing small roles in Gharwali Baharwali and Bade Miyan Chote Miyan, but appearing as the female lead, Milli, in the film Iski Topi Uske Sarr. She also played the role of a prostitute in the Pamela Rooks drama Train to Pakistan set during the time of the partition of India, in 1947.

In 1999, Dutta made her Punjabi debut in the romantic drama Shaheed-e-Mohabbat Boota Singh, in the first of her many roles opposite Gurdas Maan. The film was also set during the 1947 Indian partition and was based on the real-life story of a Sikh soldier, Boota Singh. Dutta played his Muslim wife, Zainab, who was separated from him and pressurised by her family. It was well-received and a surprise hit at the box office. Dutta was praised for her performance, with the Tribune remarking that she is "competent in the depiction of Punjabi exuberance, as well as acute grief." She played supporting roles in the films Samar, Rajaji and Tabaahi – The Destroyer.

The following year, Dutta made her Nepali debut in the romance film Basanti, playing the role of Malati. In 2001, she also had one release, the suspense thriller Kasoor, directed by Vikram Bhatt. She played the role of Ms. Payal and dubbed the voice of non-Hindi speaking actress Lisa Ray. The film was a commercial success.

In 2002, Dutta had six releases — she made a special appearance in the Nepali film Maya Namara, and appeared in Inth Ka Jawab Patthar, playing the role of Kanchan. She played supporting roles in Shakti: The Power alongside Karisma Kapoor and Shah Rukh Khan, and in Sur – The Melody of Life. She appeared alongside Gurdas Maan and Tabu in Zindagi Khoobsoorat Hai, directed by Manoj Punj. She played the role of Durgawati Devi alongside Sunny Deol and Bobby Deol in 23rd March 1931: Shaheed, but the movie was a flop at the box office. In 2003, she ventured into comedy with Praan Jaye Par Shaan Na Jaye, playing the role of Dulari. She appeared in two ensemble movies, the family film Baghban and the war film LOC Kargil. Both were well-received, but in the latter she was described as barely having "the screen time that may be consumed in a blink." She played the role of Chatterjee's daughter in Jogger's Park and received her first nomination for the Star Guild Award for Best Actress in a Supporting Role for her performance.

=== 2004–2008: Recognition in Hindi films ===
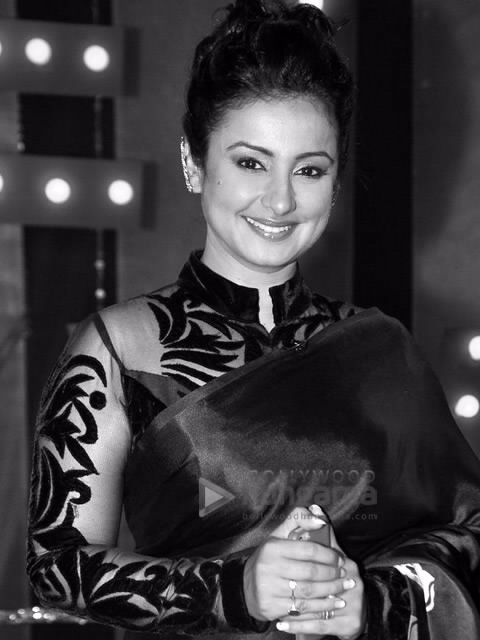
Dutta in May 2014

In 2004, Dutta made her breakthrough in Hindi cinema with the role of Shabbo with Yash Chopra's epic love saga Veer-Zaara, alongside Shah Rukh Khan, Preity Zinta and Rani Mukerji. The film received widespread critical acclaim and emerged an all-time blockbuster at the box office. Dutta was widely lauded for her performance, with Aakash Gandhi describing her as "doing a fantastic job serving as the maid who's trying to join the two lovers", and critic Subhash K. Jha remarking that she "bring[s] enormous feeling." For her performance, Dutta received nominations at several award ceremonies, including her first nomination for the Filmfare Award for Best Supporting Actress. That same year, she also appeared in supporting roles in Murder and Agnipankh, and collaborated for a third time with director Manoj Punj in the Punjabi film Des Hoyaa Pardes. She also played lead roles in Shobhayatra and the comedy film Shaadi Ka Laddoo.

The following year, Dutta had seven releases, with appearances in Dil Ke Pechey Pechey, Naam Gum Jaayega and Dubai Return. She also appeared in Silsiilay alongside Shah Rukh Khan and Bhumika Chawla, and in the comedy Mr Ya Miss. She played Ila Bose, the sister of Subhas Chandra Bose, in the film based on his life, Netaji Subhas Chandra Bose: The Forgotten Hero, and was described as "outstanding" by film critic Subhash K. Jha. She also played the title role in Sanyogita: The Bride in Red, a Rajasthani girl struggling to control her desires in a patriarchal society. The film received rave reviews in France and won the Best Film Award at the Lyon Asian Film Festival. In 2006, Dutta appeared in a small role in Darwaaza Bandh Rakho, alongside Aftab Shivdasani and Isha Sharvani. The film underperformed at the box office. She also appeared in Umrao Jaan, and despite the film receiving mixed reviews and performing poorly at the box office, Dutta's performance was praised, with the Tribune remarking that she is "convincing," but Rediff criticised the film for underutilising her and called her "an exceptional artist...reduced to a sidekick."

Dutta made her international debut in the English Rituparno Ghosh film The Last Lear alongside Amitabh Bachchan, Preity Zinta and Arjun Rampal, playing the role of Ivy, a nurse. The film premiered at the Toronto International Film Festival. Reviews of the film were mixed, but Dutta was mostly praised for her portrayal, with Aparajita Ghosh calling her "simply superb" but Joxily John remarking that she is "wasted in a character that does not add any significant value to the proceedings." She also played supporting roles in the sports drama Apne as part of an ensemble cast including Dharmendra and Katrina Kaif, and in the dance drama Aaja Nachle alongside Madhuri Dixit. Although the former was a hit, the latter underperformed at the box office. In 2008, she played supporting roles in U Me Aur Hum alongside Ajay Devgn and Kajol, and in Summer 2007. For her performance in Welcome to Sajjanpur, she received the Star Sabse Favourite Kaun Award. She also appeared opposite Vinay Pathak in the comedy Oh, My God, which received mainly negative reviews, although Dutta's performance was branded "earnest." She played the titular role in Kahaani Gudiya Ki...True Story of a Woman and was praised for her portrayal of a Muslim woman in the Kargil War.

=== 2009–2012: Delhi-6 and expansion ===
Dutta's first release of 2009, the Rakeysh Omprakash Mehra's drama film Delhi-6, was a box office flop and received mixed reviews. For her portrayal of the low-caste trash collector girl, Jalebi, Dutta was highly praised, with Taran Adarsh calling her "admirable" and BehindWoods calling the supporting actors, including Dutta, "the highlight of the film". Dutta received nominations for Best Supporting Actress at various awards ceremonies, including Filmfare, and won her first IIFA Award for Best Supporting Actress. She starred in Love Khichdi alongside Randeep Hooda and Avijit Ghosh of the Economic Times called her "among those who stand out." She also appeared in Morning Walk and her performance was described as "good", although the film received negative reviews. Her other two releases that year were Mini Punjab and Paroksh.

In 2010, she appeared in the Punjabi film Sukhmani: Hope for Life, once again alongside Juhi Chawla and Gurdas Maan, playing the role of Reshma. For her performance, she received the PTC Punjabi Film Award for Best Actress. She played a supporting role in the Manoj Tiwari directed comedy film Hello Darling. The film received highly negative reviews, but Dutta's performance received mixed reviews, with Joginder Tuteja calling her "okay," while NDTV calling her one of the actresses who make an impression. She also appeared in Malik Ek, based on the life of Shirdi Sai Baba, playing one of his devotees, Laxmi. The film received mostly negative reviews, but her performance received mixed reviews and was described as "efficient" by Komal Nahta. The same year, she appeared in two international ventures; director Fred Holmes' multilingual project Heart Land and the film Hisss alongside Mallika Sherawat. The film received negative reviews and was criticised for underutilising her, with Taran Adarsh calling her "wasted" and Pankaj Sabnani remarking that she "doesn't have much scope."

The following year, Dutta had nine releases, making appearances in Chaloo Movie and Masti Express, as well as the Punjabi film The Lion of Punjab. Her film Haat: The Weekly Bazaar had its teasers and promo screened at the Cannes Film Festival. She played the lead role of Sanja, a woman who decides to leave her husband but maintains her dignity in the male-dominated society. The film won the Special Jury's Award at the Third Eye Asian Film Festival in Mumbai. She also played supporting roles in the comedy Mummy Punjabi, alongside Kirron Kher and My Friend Pinto, alongside Prateik Babbar and Kalki Koechlin. Her performance in the former received positive reviews, with the Daily Bhaskar branding her "the only character that stands out" and a "firebrand." However, her performance in the latter was met with mixed reviews, with Rediff stating, "Considering the oomph factor which Divya is capable of oozing on screen, it is one more opportunity lost as the all-pervading air is one of buffoonery," but with Jhinuk Sen calling her "rather endearing." She played the female lead, Minnie, in the Dev Anand film Chargesheet, which was met with highly negative reviews. However, Dutta's performance was positively received, with NDTV remarking that she "does Mini Singh to perfection." She also played lead roles in the drama Monica and the independent film Stanley Ka Dabba. In the former, she played the title role of a journalist, and the film received mixed reviews, but her performance was praised. Mahesh Bhatt remarked that Dutta "bares her soul on the screen," and Komal Nahta said, "Dutta does a fine job, conveying her fears and frustration, especially in the second half, beautifully." The film was a disaster at the box office. Stanley Ka Dabba, on the other hand, received overwhelmingly positive reviews, and Dutta was praised for her portrayal of a teacher, with Rediff remarking that she is "sure to bring back rose-tinted memories of saccharine-oversweet teachers you couldn't get enough of," and Sonia Chopra saying "Dutta shines in her role as the sympathetic teacher." The film was a hit at the box office.

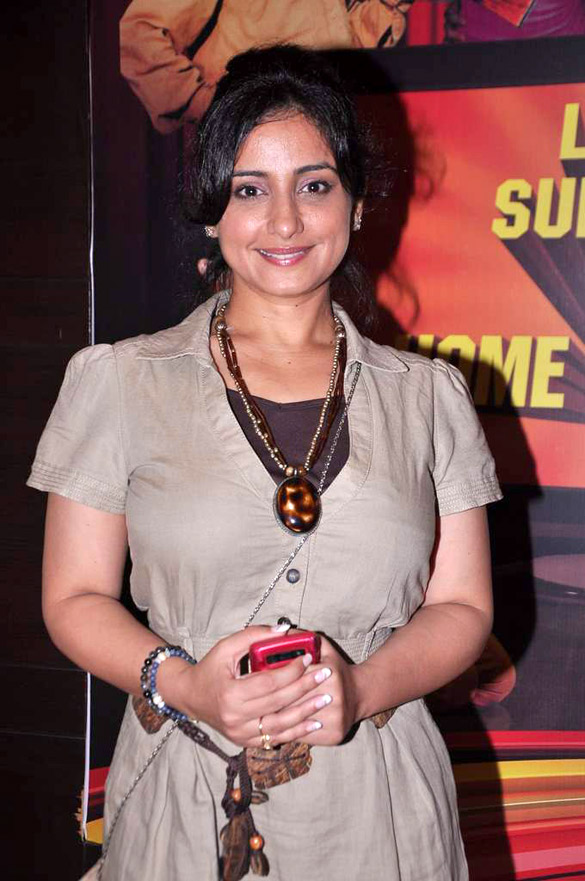
Dutta at the first look launch of Heroine

In 2012, Dutta appeared alongside Karisma Kapoor in Dangerous Ishhq, playing three characters. The film received mostly negative reviews and was a flop at the box office, although her performance was lauded, with Taran Ardash remarking, "Divya Dutta does very well, but, again, gets no scope after a point," and Mrigank Dhaniwala stating, "Divya Dutta does fine job in multiple roles." Her next release, the Madhur Bhandarkar drama Heroine also received negative reviews and had a below average performance at the box office. However, her performance as Pallavi Narayan, the PR manager of a struggling actress, was highly praised, with Taran Adarsh commenting, "a special mention of Divya Dutta [in terrific form]" and Lisa Tsering remarking "the supporting actors are strong throughout, especially the smart Divya Dutta as a wily PR maven." Her performance earned her another nomination for the IIFA Award for Best Supporting Actress. Dutta also appeared in the film Overtime.

=== 2013–present: Bhaag Milkha Bhaag and beyond ===
In 2013, Dutta appeared in some of the year's most critically acclaimed hits. Her first release was the Neeraj Pandey thriller heist film Special 26 alongside Akshay Kumar and Kajal Aggarwal. The film was a critical and commercial success. Her comedy turn as Shanti was praised, with Madhureeta Mukherjee commenting, "Dutta throws in laughs." Her next release was the drama Gippi, produced by Karan Johar, in which she played a single mother struggling with her victimised daughter. Dutta took inspiration from her mother for her role and received mixed reviews, with Rediff commenting, "Her acting was alright," but in.com saying, "Dutta aces the mummy act." The film was an average performer at the box office. Dutta received a nomination for the Screen Award for Best Supporting Actress for her performance. Dutta then made an appearance in the period romantic drama Lootera alongside Ranveer Singh and Sonakshi Sinha. The film was critically acclaimed and an average performer at the box office.

Dutta's next release was the biographical sports film Bhaag Milkha Bhaag, based on the life of Milkha Singh. She appeared alongside Farhan Akhtar, Sonam Kapoor and Meesha Shafi, playing the sister of Singh. The film proved to be Dutta's biggest commercial success to date and entered the 100-crore club. The film, and her performance, were highly praised, with the Times of India branding her "outstanding," and Priya Joshi calling her "exceptional in a poignant role as his protective elder sister." For her performance, Dutta received nominations at several awards ceremonies, including Filmfare, and eventually won her second IIFA Award for Best Supporting Actress. Her final release of the year was the political action thriller Zila Ghaziabad alongside Arshad Warsi and Sanjay Dutt. The film received mostly negative reviews, although Dutta was described as one of the "few quality actors".

In 2014, Dutta's first release was the horror-thriller Ragini MMS 2, a sequel to Ragini MMS, alongside Sunny Leone and Parvin Dabas. Dutta played a psychiatrist, Dr. Meera Dutta and received mixed reviews, with Madhureeta Mukherjee stating that she "stays trapped in an unconvincing role,". The film was a super hit at the box office. Her second release was the biographical film Manjunath alongside Seema Biswas and Kishore Kadam. The film received positive reviews and her performance as Anjali Mullati, the owner of a consulting company who decides to start fighting her own battle against the mafia, was praised, with Taran Ardash calling her "absolutely believable."

Dutta appeared in the 2016 thriller film Traffic alongside Manoj Bajpayee, a remake of the Malayalam film of the same name. She also appeared in successful movies like Badlapur (2015), Blackmail (2018) and Babumoshai Bandookbaaz (2017). She also acted in a short film Plus Minus (2018), which got 16 million views on YouTube and another short film The Playboy Mr. Sawhney. Plus Minus was the winner in the Most Popular Short Film category at the 2019 Filmfare Awards.

In 2019 she appeared in supernatural thriller 706 (film) directed by Shravan Tiwari and co-starring Atul Kulkarni, Mohan Agashe and Raayo S. Bakhirta.

== Personal life ==
Dutta is unmarried. She wrote a memoir, Me and Ma, about her heavenly relationship with her mother. Me and Ma celebrates her mother's struggles to turn her into the woman she is today. The book was published on 10 February 2017 by Penguin Random House.

== Awards and nominations ==
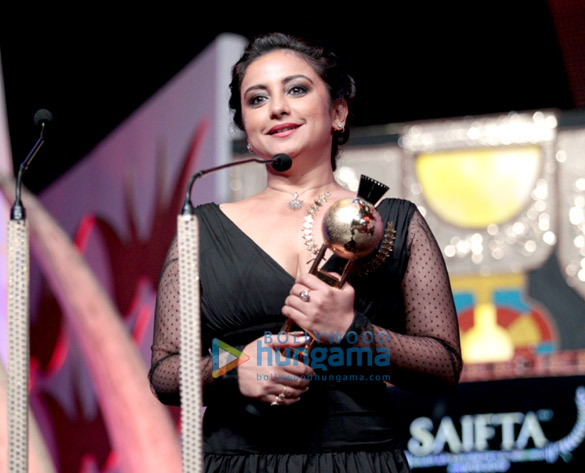
Dutta at SAIFTA Awards 2013

National Film Awards

- 2018 – National Film Award for Best Supporting Actress – Irada

Filmfare Awards

- 2005 – Nominated – Filmfare Award for Best Supporting Actress – Veer-Zaara
- 2010 – Nominated – Filmfare Award for Best Supporting Actress – Delhi-6
- 2014 – Nominated – Filmfare Award for Best Supporting Actress – Bhaag Milkha Bhaag

Filmfare OTT Awards

- 2020 – Won – Filmfare OTT Award for Best Supporting Actress (Drama Series) – Special OPS

Zee Cine Awards

- 2005 – Won – Zee Cine Award for Best Actor in a Supporting Role – Female – Veer-Zaara
- 2014 – Won – Zee Cine Award for Best Actor in a Supporting Role – Female – Bhaag Milkha Bhaag

IIFA Awards

- 2005 – Nominated – IIFA Award for Best Supporting Actress – Veer-Zaara
- 2010 – Won – IIFA Award for Best Supporting Actress – Delhi-6
- 2012 – Nominated – IIFA Award for Best Supporting Actress – Stanley Ka Dabba
- 2013 – Nominated – IIFA Award for Best Supporting Actress – Heroine
- 2014 – Won – IIFA Award for Best Supporting Actress – Bhaag Milkha Bhaag

Global Indian Film Awards

- 2005 – Won – GIFA Award for Best Supporting Actress – Veer-Zaara

Apsara Film & Television Producers Guild Awards

- 2004 – Nominated – Apsara Award for Best Actress in a Supporting Role – Joggers' Park
- 2012 – Nominated – Apsara Award for Best Actress in a Supporting Role – Stanley Ka Dabba
- 2014 – Won – Apsara Award for Best Actress in a Supporting Role – Bhaag Milkha Bhaag

Screen Awards

- 2005 – Nominated – Screen Award for Best Supporting Actress – Veer-Zaara
- 2010 – Nominated – Screen Award for Best Supporting Actress – Delhi-6
- 2014 – Nominated – Screen Award for Best Supporting Actress – Gippi
- 2019 – Nominated – Screen Award for Best Supporting Actress – Blackmail

Other awards

- 1993 – Won – Best Actress & Best Dancer Award in Punjab Youth Festival
- 2026 – Won – Literary Voice Award, Power Creator Awards

== Filmography ==
=== Films ===
Key
†	Denotes films that have not yet been released

Year	Title	Role	Notes
1994	Ishq Mein Jeena Ishq Mein Marna	Sapna	
1995	Surakshaa	Bindiya	
1995	Veergati	Sandhya	
1996	Agni Sakshi	Urmi	
1996	Chhote Sarkar	Meena	
1996	Ram Aur Shyam	Sunaina	
1997	Raja Ki Aayegi Baraat	Sharda's Sister	
1997	Daava	Deepa	
1998	Gharwali Baharwali	Madhu	
1998	Iski Topi Uske Sarr	Milli	
1998	Bade Miyan Chote Miyan	Madhu	Special appearance
1998	Train to Pakistan	Haseena	
1999	Shaheed-e-Mohabbat Boota Singh	Zainab	Punjabi film
1999	Samar		Hindi / Urdu film
1999	Rajaji	Sonia	
1999	Tabaahi – The Destroyer		
2000	Basanti	Malati	Nepali film
2001	Kasoor	Ms Payal	Also dubbed for Lisa Ray
2002	Maya Namara	Anu	Nepali film Special appearance
2002	Inth Ka Jawab Patthar		
2002	23rd March 1931: Shaheed	Durga Bhabhi	
2002	Sur – The Melody of Life	Rita D'Silva	
2002	Shakti: The Power	Shekhar's sister	
2002	Zindagi Khoobsoorat Hai	Kitu	
2002	Game		Tamil film
2003	Praan Jaye Par Shaan Na Jaye	Dulari	
2003	Jogger's Park	Chatterjee's daughter	
2003	Baghban	Reena Malhotra	
2003	LOC Kargil	Yadav's wife	
2004	Shobhayatra	Rani of Jhansi	
2004	Agnipankh	Nupur	
2004	Shaadi Ka Laddoo	Geetu	
2004	Veer-Zaara	Shabbo	
2004	Murder	Nargis	
2004	Des Hoyaa Pardes	Guddi	Punjabi film
2005	Dil Ke Pechey Pechey	Vidya	
2005	Naam Gum Jaayega	Divya	
2005	Netaji Subhas Chandra Bose: The Forgotten Hero	Ila Bose	
2005	Silsiilay	Diya Rao	
2005	Sanyogita- The Bride in Red	Sanyogita	
2005	Mr Ya Miss	Loveleen Kapoor	
2005	Dubai Return	Vaishali	
2005	Twinkle Twinkle Little Star	Police Officer	Malayalam film Delayed
2006	Darwaaza Bandh Rakho	Chameli G. Kale	
2006	Waris Shah: Ishq Daa Waaris	Saboo	Punjabi film
2006	Umrao Jaan	Bismillah Jaan	
2007	Apne	Pooja B. Singh Choudhary	
2007	The Last Lear	Ivy	English film
2007	Aaja Nachle	Najma	
2008	U Me Aur Hum	Reena	
2008	Kahaani Gudiya Ki...: True Story of a Woman	Gudiya	
2008	Summer 2007	Dancer/Singer	Cameo appearance
2008	Welcome to Sajjanpur	Vindhya	
2008	Oh, My God!!	Suman R. Dubey	
2009	Delhi-6	Jalebi	
2009	Mini Punjab	Shabbo	
2009	Morning Walk	Rita	
2009	Love Khichdi	Parminder Kaur	
2009	Paroksh	Gauri	
2010	Sukhmani: Hope for Life	Reshma	Punjabi film
2010	Malik Ek	Laxmi	
2010	Hisss	Maya Gupta	English/Hindi film
2010	Heart Land	Amrita	English film
2010	Hello Darling	Mrs. Hardik	
2011	Haat- The Weekly Bazaar	Sanja	
2011	Masti Express	Seema	
2011	Monica	Monica R. Jaitley	
2011	The Lion of Punjab		Punjabi film
2011	Stanley Ka Dabba	Rosy Miss	
2011	Chargesheet	Minnie Singh	
2011	Mummy Punjabi	Muniya	
2011	My Friend Pinto	Reshma Shergill	
2011	Chaloo Movie	Ms Urmila Undreskar	
2012	Dangerous Ishhq	Neetu, Chanda, Tawaif and Divya	
2012	Heroine	Pallavi Narayan	
2012	Overtime		
2013	Special 26	Shanti	
2013	Boyss Toh Boyss Hain		
2013	Zila Ghaziabad	Mahenderi	
2013	Gippi	Pappi	
2013	Lootera	Shyama	
2013	Bhaag Milkha Bhaag	Ishri Kaur	
2014	Ragini MMS 2	Dr Meera Dutta	
2014	Manjunath	Anjali Mullati	
2015	Badlapur	Shobha	
2015	Chehere: A Modern Day Classic	Amanat	
2015	Promise Dad	Suzanne	
2016	Chalk n Duster	Kamini Gupta	
2016	Traffic	Maya Gupta	
2017	Irada	Ramadeep Braitch	
2017	Babumoshai Bandookbaaz	Jiji	
2017	Sniff		
2018	Blackmail	Dolly Verma	
2018	Fanney Khan	Kavita Sharma	
2018	Plus Minus		Short film
2018	Manto	Kulwant Kaur	
2019	Music Teacher	Geeta	
2019	706	Dr Suman Asthana	
2019	Jhalki	Sunita Bhartiya	
2020	Ram Singh Charlie		
2020	Sleeping Partner	Beena	Short film
2021	Sheer Qorma	Noor Khan	
2022	Maa	Manjit Kaur	Punjabi film
2022	Dhaakad	Rohini	
2022	Anth The End		
2022	Nazar Andaaz	Bhavani	
2023	Otta		Malayalam film
2023	Aankh Micholi	Billo	
2024	Sharmajee Ki Beti	Kiran Sharma	
2024	Sikandar Ka Muqaddar	Kaushalya Singh	
2025	Chhaava	Rajmata Soyrabai Bhosale	
2026	Last Man in Tower	Mrs. Puri	
2026	Gajab Raat	Suneeta Chaudhary	A Netflix film
	Nastik †	TBA	

=== Television ===
Year	Title	Role	Network	Language	Ref.
2005–2006	Shanno Ki Shaadi	Shanno	StarPlus	Hindi	
2005	Awaaz Punjab Di	Host/presenter		Hindi	
2015–2016	Savdhaan India	Host/presenter	Life OK / Star Bharat	Hindi	
2020	Special Ops	Sadia Qureshi	Disney+ Hotstar	Hindi	
2020	Hostages	Ayesha Khan	Disney+ Hotstar	Hindi	
2024	Bandish Bandits	Nandini	Amazon Prime Video	Hindi	
2025	Mayasabha	Iravati Basu	SonyLIV	Telugu	
2026	Chiraiya	Kamlesh	JioHotstar	Hindi	
