= Helen Gleeson =

British physicist

Helen Gleeson OBE
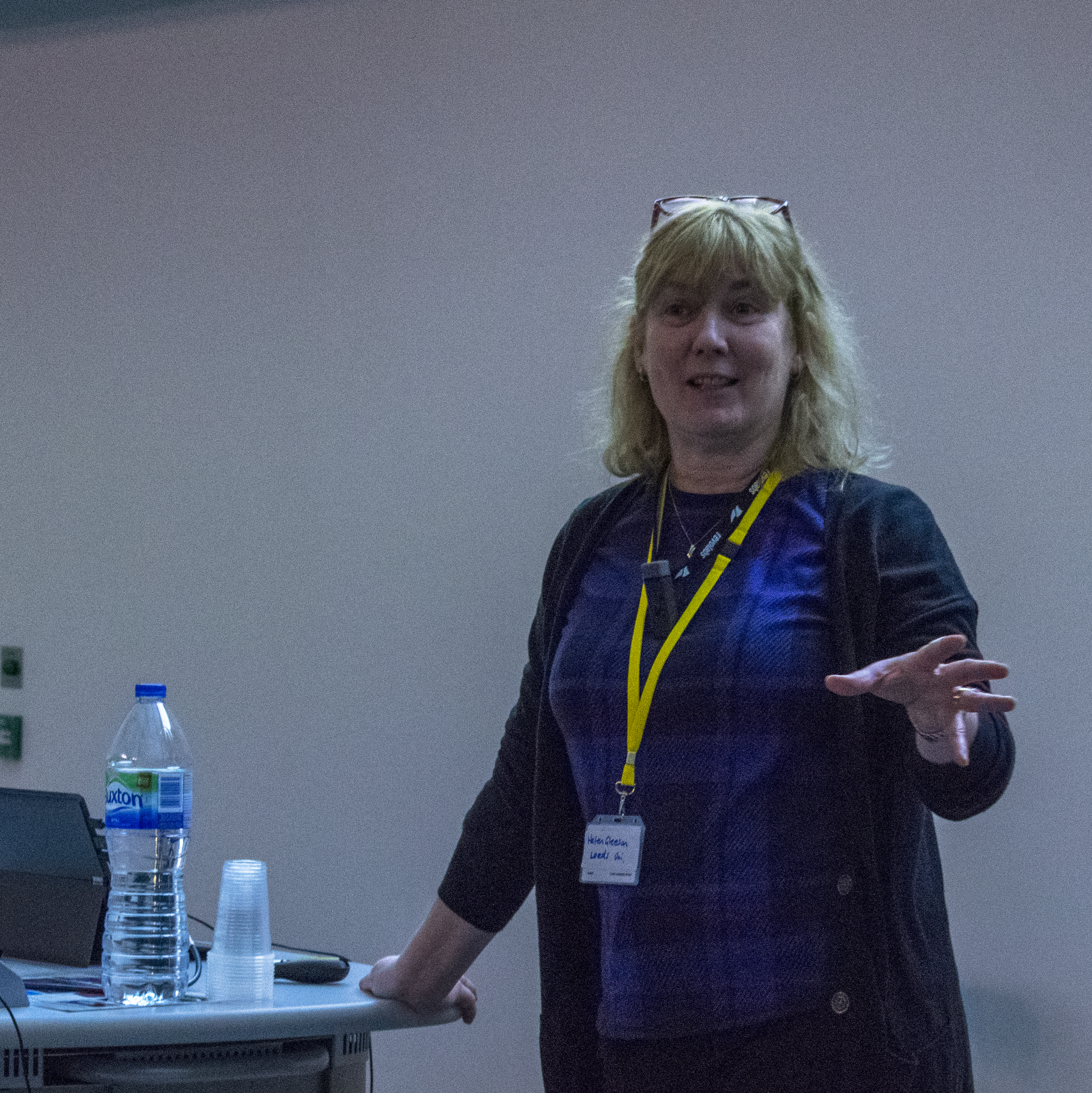
- Born: Helen F. Gleeson
- Education: University of Manchester (BSc, PhD)
- Awards: Founders' Prize (2026); Holweck Medal (2012); OBE (2009); FInstP
- Scientific career
- Fields: Physics; Liquid crystal
- Workplaces: University of Leeds
- Thesis: Optical and electro-optical properties of chiral mesophases (1986)
- Website: physicalsciences.leeds.ac.uk/staff/108/professor-helen-f-gleeson

Helen Frances Gleeson OBE FInstP is a British physicist who specialises in soft matter and liquid crystals. She is Cavendish Professor and former Head of the School of Physics at the University of Leeds.

== Education and early career ==
Gleeson grew up in the North of England and attended a secondary school in Keighley. She studied A-Levels in Maths, Further Maths, Physics and Chemistry. She graduated from the University of Manchester in 1983 with a Bachelor of Science degree in Mathematics and Physics. She went on to study for a PhD which she was awarded in 1986 for investigations of the optical and electro-optical properties of chiral mesophases. She remained at Manchester, working as a senior scientist in the Wolfson Liquid Crystal industrially funded research centre. She was made a university lecturer in 1989.

== Research ==
Gleeson's research investigates self-assembling and self-ordering materials, especially chiral liquid crystals. At the University of Manchester, Gleeson was made Associate Dean for Research in the Faculty of Engineering and Physical Sciences in 2004. Between 2008 and 2010 she served as Head of the School of Physics and Astronomy. She has served as the Chairman of the British Liquid Crystal Society. It was announced that Glesson would move to the University of Leeds as Head of School and Cavendish Chair of Physics in late 2014. The position has been occupied by several eminent physicists, including William Henry Bragg. She joined the University of Leeds in January 2015, but maintains a position at the University of Manchester as a visiting scientist. She is interested in novel experimental techniques to characterise liquid crystals, and in 2016 contributed a chapter on Raman spectroscopy to the book Liquid Crystals with Nano and Microparticles.

Her work concentrates on the experimental study of liquid crystals; in particular those with reduced symmetry. She looks to use liquid crystals for photonics. She holds several patents, including one for switchable contact lenses where the application of a voltage can change the refractive index of a liquid crystal. This can moderate the focus of the lenses, the same as changing putting on reading glasses. She has also invented liquid crystalline temperature recorders, where the liquid crystal contains a reactive monomer and an initiator that can crosslink. Working with Andre Geim, Gleeson produced the first graphene liquid crystal device. The devices contained transparent graphene electrodes, and had an exceptionally high contrast ratio. Gleeson went on to use graphene in the switchable liquid crystalline contact lenses. In 2015, Gleeson and her PhD student Devesh Mistry were awarded a Royal Commission for the Exhibition of 1851 industry fellowship to work with UltraVision on novel contact lenses that incorporate liquid crystals into intraocular lenses, particularly for people suffering from presbyopia.

In 2017 she launched a five-year £1 million partnership with Merck Group to investigate liquid crystals in optical innovations. In 2018 Gleeson and Mistry demonstrated a negative order parameter in a liquid crystal elastomer. This work marked a breakthrough for the auxetic liquid crystal community; offering the first synthetic molecular auxetic polymer. Her current research includes liquid crystals for laser protection and biosensing. She looks to develop a flexible and cheap strip that acts like a Liquid crystal thermometer, but instead of monitoring changes in temperature changes colour when it detects a bacterial toxin or biomarker.

Throughout her career, Gleeson has been involved in several initiatives to improve gender balance in physics. She is involved with the Women's Engineering Society. She was awarded an Order of the British Empire in 2009, in recognition of her outreach efforts, and in particular her work to increase the number of girls studying physics. She has served as chair of the Institute of Physics JUNO assessment panel.

== Select publications ==
- Peter Blake; Paul D Brimicombe; Rahul R Nair; et al. (30 April 2008). "Graphene-based liquid crystal device". Nano Letters. 8 (6): 1704–1708. arXiv:0803.3031. doi:10.1021/nl080649i. ISSN 1530-6984. PMID 18444691. Wikidata Q34774749.
- Helen Gleeson; Ana Calderon; Viren Swami; Jessica Deighton; Miranda Wolpert; Julian Edbrooke-Childs (16 August 2016). "Systematic review of approaches to using patient experience data for quality improvement in healthcare settings". BMJ Open. 6 (8) e011907. doi:10.1136/bmjopen-2016-011907. ISSN 2044-6055. PMC 5013495. PMID 27531733. Wikidata Q31121963.
- Abhijit Dan; Shikha Aery; Shuning Zhang; Daniel L Baker; Helen F Gleeson; Anwesha Sarkar (7 August 2020). "Protein Microgel-Stabilized Pickering Liquid Crystal Emulsions Undergo Analyte-Triggered Configurational Transition". Langmuir. doi:10.1021/acs.langmuir.0c01345. ISSN 0743-7463. PMID 32787024. Wikidata Q98392488.

== Awards and honours ==
- 2026 Institute of Physics Polymer Physics Group Founders' Prize
- 2018 Times Higher Education Outstanding Research Supervisor of the Year award
- 2013 British Liquid Crystal Society Gray Medal
- 2012 Société Française de Physique and Institute of Physics Holweck Medal and Prize
- 2009 Appointed an Officer of the Order of the British Empire (OBE) in the Birthday Honours, "for services to science"
- 2006 British Liquid Crystal Society Hilsum Medal
