= Joggers' Park (film) =

- Directed by: Anant Balani
- Written by: Subhash Ghai
- Produced by: Subhash Ghai; Prem Pillai
- Starring: Victor Bannerjee; Perizaad Zorabian; Divya Dutta
- Cinematography: Sanjay Nair
- Edited by: Srinivas Patro
- Music by: Tabun Sutradhar
- Distributed by: Mukta Arts; Rainbow Films U.S.A.
- Release date: 12 September 2003 (India)
- Running time: 133 minutes
- Language: Hindi
- Budget: ₹1.5 crore
- Box office: ₹2.1 crore

Joggers' Park is a 2003 Indian Hindi-language drama film directed by Anant Balani and written by Subhash Ghai. It stars renowned actor Victor Bannerjee, Perizaad Zorabian and Divya Dutta. It was filmed on location in Mumbai's Jogger's Park.

The film was released on 12 September 2003 and performed well at the box office.

== Plot ==
The film opens at a Rotary Club function to honour a retired Justice Jyotin Chatterjee. The judge has served the profession all his life with honour and spotless integrity. As he is about to retire, he recognises there will now be a void in his life. His wife remarks to reporters that neither he nor she knows what he would do after he retires.

Retired life is not easy for the ageing judge. The younger generation is bolder and quicker than he was in his time. He is invited as the guest of honour at many functions. But he finds that his stump speech about the venerable and time-tested legal profession falls flat. The youngsters wish to know when the law will relax its grip on their issues (principally around love, romance, and sex). The judge admits that love makes the world go round and urges the youngsters to enjoy their youth but to do so responsibly. The judge also agrees (after some initial reluctance) to a suggestion from his family and visits Joggers Park to get some exercise. He finds that the park moves at the pace of its younger regulars, much too quickly for him. He wonders if he will ever catch up.

Around this time, he meets Jenny Suratwala at Joggers Park. Jenny is a young and vivacious freelance model and event planner. One of his speeches had made an impression on her young mind, and she wishes to learn more about him. They become friends. As their friendship deepens, they discover a new world in each other. Jenny learns from the judge's vast experiences, and the judge uses her perspectives to enter and appreciate the younger generation. Jenny brings an element of need. She is faced with a legal problem around the ownership of her late father's apartment, and the judge helps her fight and win her case.

The friendship deepens. The judge is taken by her exhilarating views and wishes to see more of her. She, too, pines for him when they are apart. Around this time, some of Jenny's younger male colleagues are perturbed by this relationship. It thwarts them from pursuing Jenny, and it is not socially acceptable because of the conspicuous age difference. They resolve to find a way to end it and settle on stalking the couple and taking pictures of their intimate moments. (The film is not clear about any sexual activity, but the pictures are sufficient to destroy the judge's reputation and marriage.) On one occasion, Jenny discovers them taking pictures, and she angrily berates them and destroys some of the pictures. Jenny finally admits she is in love with the judge.

Meanwhile, the judge is faced with a family problem of his own. His son has been caught having an affair. His daughter exposes the incident and asks the judge, the vanguard of honour, to deliver judgement. The judge strongly reprimands his son and orders him to end the affair and seek forgiveness from his family. The family honour comes first.

Jenny has an upcoming birthday. One of her friends is planning the party. She invites the judge to attend the party and openly professes his love for her. If he truly meant his speeches, then he must act accordingly and express his feelings without fear or remorse.

On the day of the party, a strange man shows up at the judge's house. He is Tariq Ahmed, the editor and publisher of a local tabloid. Jenny's jealous colleagues brought the photos to his tabloid, and Tariq intercepted them just in time to avoid publication. It turns out that Tariq owes a debt of gratitude to the judge for having helped him with a difficult case several years ago. He turns the photos over to the judge's daughter. The daughter confronts the judge. This incident also involves the family's honour. The judge is compelled to end his relationship with Jenny.

Several years later, the judge runs into Jenny at the airport. Jenny is now married and has a child. They greet each other warmly, and Jenny introduces him (her fourth boyfriend, the one she loved very much) to her husband. They fondly remember their previous association as the film ends.

== Cast ==
- Victor Banerjee as Justice Jyotin Prasad Chatterjee
- Perizaad Zorabian as Jenny Suratwala
- Girish Karnad as Aman Joshi
- Divya Dutta as Chatterjee's daughter
- Khalid Siddiqui
- Hiten Tejwani as Akash Sanghvi (Jennie's friend)
- Manoj Joshi as Tariq Ahmed
- Bhavna Ruparel
- Raju Kher as Sneha Ruparel
- Abha Dhulia
- Rajesh Jais
- Dinyar Contractor as Dinshaw
- Anant Mahadevan
- Vivek Vaswani

== Release ==
Joggers' Park released in India, the United States and Kuwait. It also was screened at the 2003 Cairo International Film Festival.

=== Critical reception ===
The film received a mixed critical reception. Prem Panicker of Rediff praised Victor Banerjee's acting, but said the film was too cliché and unoriginal. Planet Bollywood also positively reviewed Bannerjee's performance, but criticised the film for having a "lack of tautness that makes it drag in patches". Taran Adarsh of IndiaFM (now Bollywood Hungama) gave the film 2 out of 5, writing, "On the whole, JOGGERS' PARK is an honest attempt at meaningful, sensible cinema that's slowly proving a healthy alternative for the discerning audiences of metros. "

=== Box office ===
Joggers' Park opened with a ₹120,000 per print average and eventually had a run of over 100 days. In its first five weeks in theatres Joggers' Park earned around ₹21,000,000.

== Soundtrack ==
Joggers' Park

Soundtrack album by Tabun Sutradhar
- Released: 23 May 2003
- Genre: Feature film soundtrack
- Labels: Virgin Records; Mukta Arts

Tabun Sutradhar composed the film's music. Several lyricists wrote for the film, including Zameer Kazmi and Sameer.

1. "Joggers' Park" (Part 1) – Usha Uthup (Usha Uthup, Subhash Ghai, Nisha)
2. "Joggers' Park" (Part 2) – Usha Uthup (Usha Uthup, Subhash Ghai, Nisha)
3. "Badi Nazuk Hai Ye Manzil" – Jagjit Singh (Zameer Kazmi)
4. "Dil Jalta Hai" (Remix) – Sudesh Bhosle
5. "Habba Habba Hui" – Asha Bhosle (Sameer)
6. "Ishq Hota Nahin Sabke Liye" – Adnan Sami (Zameer Kazmi)
7. "Jenny's Theme" – Instrumental
8. "Kabhi Pa Liya To Kabhi Kho Diya" – Usha Uthup (Subhash Ghai)
9. "Oh My Heart" – Usha Uthup (Usha Uthup)
10. Theme Piece – Instrumental
