= Joe Rajan =

Indian film director and producer

- Born: Thrissur, Kerala, India
- Occupations: Director, Businessmen
- Spouse: Rochelle D'Souza
- Children: 2

Joe Rajan is an Indian film director and producer. He is CEO and founder of Harvey World Destinations, an Indian travel company. He is appointed as the working President of the Maharashtra State Human Rights Protection Mission. (Regd. under Govt of India NO.302/2012)

== Early life and background ==
Raja was born in Thrissur, Kerala to Mr. V. K. Rajan and Annie Rajan.

Rajan began his career as an employee in a travel company in Mahim, Mumbai, eventually becoming a vice-president (sales and marketing). In 2005, he started his own travel company, Harvey India.

== Films career ==
In 2013, Rajan ventured into the Indian Film Industry – producing and directing his debut film, Luv U Soniyo, which released on 26 July 2013. The film, a romantic comedy, was bought by media giant Network 18 and had a fair run at the box office and was the launch of Rati Agnihotri's son Tanuj Virwani and Miss India 2010 Neha Hinge. Recently, he co-produced the critically acclaimed Marathi Movie Kanha along with Zee studios. He is currently producing the Marathi Movie Ranangan along with Viacom 18 motion pictures and Karishma Jain.

== Personal life ==
Rajan is married to Rochelle D'Souza and has two children.

== Philanthropist ==
Rajan has been actively involved in several charities and he regularly sponsors various church events in Mumbai. He and his wife Rochelle host an annual Christmas brunch where prominent names of the hospitality industry, politics and fashion rubbed shoulders with people in the entertainment field.

== Achievements ==
Rajan is the Founder and CEO of Harvey India Pvt Ltd., a travel and tour organization established in 2005 with branch and associate offices all over India and an International office in Chicago. He incorporated Harvey India Holidays Pvt. Ltd. in the year 2012, which has flexible packages to popular destinations like Kerala, Goa, Himachal, Rajasthan, the Southern Hill stations and more... In addition, niche options include wildlife, Ayurveda and spas, soft adventure, Honeymoons, Pilgrimages and educational tours for students. He also incorporated Harvey India Productions in 2011, with his first directorial Debut - Luv U Soniyo.

He was also a guest Columnist for Absolut India (travel specialist). Harvey India gets the award for one of the top five performers' 2013-2014 travel company from Oberoi Hotels. India's Top producers' award from OTM, highest Average rate global Market India From Marriott hotels worldwide.

== Filmography ==
Year	Movie	Industry	Notes
2005	Page 3	Bollywood	He made a special appearance as an actor
2007	Traffic Signal	Bollywood	He made a special appearance as an actor
2013	Luv U Soniyo	Bollywood	He made his Directorial Debut for Viacom 18
2016	Kanha	Marathi language	He co-produced the movie with Purvesh Sarnaik and Zee studios
2017	Ranangan	Marathi language	Producer
2017	Ashi hi Aashiqui-Aha	Marathi language	Produced with T-series, Moving pictures and Supriya Pilgaonkar
2018	Kolhapur Diaries	Marathi language	currently directing the remake of Malayalam super hit Angamalay Diaries
