= The Tattoo Murders =

Indian web series

- Genre: Drama, Crime, Action
- Created by: Shravan Tiwari
- Written by: Shravan Tiwari
- Directed by: Shravan Tiwari
- Starring: Kulbhushan Kharbanda; Meera Chopra; Tanuj Virwani; Anupam Shyam
- Country of origin: India
- Original language: Hindi
- No. of seasons: 1
- No. of episodes: 7

Production
- Producer: Raju Raisinghani
- Cinematography: Virendra K
- Editor: Shravan Tiwari
- Camera setup: Multi-camera
- Running time: 50
- Production company: Vision Movie Makers

Original release
- Network: MX Player
- Release: 9 April 2021

The Tattoo Murders is a 2021 Indian Hindi-language crime, drama, and web series written and directed by Shravan Tiwari. It stars Tanuj Virwani, Meera Chopra, Anang Desai, Kulbhushan Kharbanda and Anupam Shyam in lead roles. The series was initially titled Kamathipura but later changed to The Tattoo Murders.

== Plot ==
The show revolves around a female cop who unravels the mystery of a serial killer who kills women and the challenges faced by the cop to solve the cases.

== Cast ==
- Tanuj Virwani as Prahar Pratap
- Meera Chopra as ACP Aditi Acharya
- Kulbhushan Kharbanda as Aditi's father
- Anupam Shyam as Aditi's Nana
- Anang Desai as DCP Ajay Khanna
- Falguni Rajani as Daya Salvi
- Priyanka Khatri as Tattoo Artist
- Rohit Rai Sahab as Kuldeep
- Varun Joshi as Shailesh Parmar
- Vikas Kumar as Shop Owner

== Filming ==
The series was shot in real locations in Kamathipura.

== Reception ==
Critic Subhash K. Jha rated the series 2 stars out of 5 and felt the series as restless and sleazy, stating "The Tattoo Murders (earlier titled Kamathipura) is a pulpy puzzle and finally a mindless mess. The atmosphere created in this series is so sleazy I wondered who the target-audience for the 7 episodes of mayhem and sleaze was. I believe lowbrow crime and campy sex have a younger non-metropolitan audience.This series feels like those softcover pulp novels that used to be available on railways stations and pavement book stalls."

Firstpost rated the series 2 out of 5 stars and wrote, "The Tattoo Murders is stung by pulpy writing, amateurish supporting actors and storytelling that relies on upon tell rather than show."

Rediff.com wrote, "A psychological angle is thrown into the mix as well and it occupies a good part of the narrative. However, it would have had a much better impact had it been cast, and directed, better."

The Daily News & Analysis opined, "And while much of the series will keep you gripped, what it still needed was good editing, chopping off the B-roll and also not to mention the pointless conversations that could have helped wrap up the series in fewer episodes."
