= Gudia =

Gudia may refer to:

- Gudia (caste), confectionery community of Odisha
- Gudja, a village in Malta
- Gudia (1947 film), an Indian drama film
- Gudia (1997 film), an Indian drama film
- Gudiya, Indian woman affected by the 1990 Kargil War
