= Let's Meet =

2025 Indian Hindi-language drama film

Let’s Meet
- Theatrical release poster
- Directed by: Ravinder (Ricky) Sandhu
- Screenplay by: Ravinder (Ricky) Sandhu
- Story by: Anil B. Akki
- Produced by: Pradeep Rangwani
- Starring: Tanuj Virwani; Suman Rana
- Cinematography: Anil B. Akki
- Edited by: Anshul R. Gupta
- Music by: Prini Siddhant Madhav; Rohan-Rohan
- Production company: UV Films
- Release date: 7 February 2025
- Running time: 103 minutes
- Country: India
- Language: Hindi

Let’s Meet is a 2025 Indian Hindi-language drama film written and directed by Ricky Sandhu and produced by Pradeep Rangwani under the UV Films banner. The film tells a story crafted by Anil B. Akki, who also served as the creative producer and cinematographer. The screenplay and dialogue are written by Ravinder Sandhu, while the music is composed by Prini Siddhant Madhav, and Rohan-Rohan, featuring lyrics by Naveen Tyagi and songs sung by Jaaved Ali, Nakash Aziz, and Rohan Pradhan.

== Plot ==
Two strangers find an unexpected connection in the digital world. Nikhil, a confident actor who loves attention, meets Priya, a reserved woman stepping out of her comfort zone through an anonymous social media profile. A random friend request sparks online chats that grow into a deep emotional bond. As their virtual relationship blossoms, they face the challenge of turning it into something real. Can their connection survive outside the digital space?

== Cast ==
- Tanuj Virwani as Nikhil
- Suman Rana as Priya
- Supriya Shailja as Nalini
- Litesh M. Pawar as Gopu
- Sristi Maheshwari Vaidyaa as Althea

== Production ==
Shot in Mumbai, the film is set to release in theatres on 7 February 2025.
