= Holy Ghost (2025 film) =

American horror mystery film

- Theatrical release poster
- Directed by: Shravan Tiwari
- Written by: Shravan Tiwari
- Produced by: Sandip Patel
- Starring: Jenn Osborne; Cleve Langdale; Maya Adler
- Cinematography: Jamaal Scott
- Edited by: Shravan Tiwari
- Music by: Ray
- Production company: SRHP Films
- Release date: 8 August 2025
- Running time: 100 minutes
- Country: United States
- Language: English

Holy Ghost is an American horror mystery film, released on 8 August 2025.

== Synopsis ==
Set in the quiet town of Augusta, the story follows Grace Brown, a young girl rescued from a kidnapper’s farm. She claims her savior was Jim Wheeler, a police officer who had died a year earlier. Detective Madison Wells takes on the case, only to find herself pulled into a dark and complex mystery involving past murders, hidden secrets, and an eerie question—has a ghost returned to protect, or to kill. As another girl vanishes, Madison’s investigation uncovers disturbing truths that blur the line between the living and the dead.

== Cast ==
- Jenn Osborne as Maddie Wells
- Cleve Langdale as Edward Brown (Masked Man)
- Maya Adler as Grace Brown
- David Tiefen Daniel as Manson
- Daniel S. Carlan as William Rave
- Aaron Blomberg as Jim Wheeler

== Production ==
Holy Ghost is a horror mystery film directed and edited by Shravan Tiwari, who also penned the screenplay and dialogue. Produced by Sandip Patel under the banner SR & HP Films, the film features cinematography by Jamaal Scott and music as well as background score by Ray. Costumes are designed by Charlene Franco. Shot entirely in the United States, the film is primarily in English and is expected to receive a UA certification. Holy Ghost was released on 1 August 2025 in the United States and on 8 August 2025 in India.
