= 706 (film) =

2019 thriller film

- Film poster
- Directed by: Shravan Tiwari
- Written by: Shravan Tiwari
- Produced by: Sandip Patel
- Starring: Atul Kulkarni; Divya Dutta; Mohan Agashe; Raayo S. Bakhirta
- Edited by: Kumar Tiwari
- Music by: Amar Mohile
- Distributed by: Panorama Studio
- Release date: 11 January 2019
- Running time: 122 minutes
- Country: India
- Language: Hindi

706 is a 2019 Hindi supernatural thriller film directed by Shravan Tiwari and produced by Sandip Patel. The film was released on 11 January 2019.

== Plot ==
In Mumbai, psychiatrist Dr. Suman searches for her missing husband, Dr. Anil Asthana. A young boy admitted to her hospital claims Asthana is dead and reveals the exact location of his body. Deputy Commissioner Shekhawat investigates the case and suspects supernatural involvement connected to his own past crime and a protective talisman given by a spiritual master.

As the investigation progresses, the boy appears to be possessed by the spirit of Suman's former patient who died by suicide. The spirit seeks revenge against both Suman and Shekhawat for their past actions. Realizing the only way to end the threat, Suman accepts responsibility for her crimes and sacrifices her own life to free the boy from possession. The spirit departs, leaving Shekhawat unprotected as he returns home to face the consequences of his past.

== Cast ==
- Mohan Agashe as Dr Anil Asthana
- Divya Dutta as Dr Suman Asthana
- Atul Kulkarni as D.C.P. Abhay Shekhawat
- Anupam Shyam as Baba in Banaras
- Raayo S. Bakhirta as Rahul Bora
- Yashvit Sancheti as Neeraj Jaimal
- Greeva Kansara as Sunita
- Hetal Rathod as Abhay's wife
- Nirali Joshi as Dr Suman's receptionist

== Release ==
The film 706 was released on 11 January 2019.Prior to its theatrical release, promotional content for the film was published on YouTube on 19 December 2018. The project is associated with producer Sandip Patel and director Shravan kumar.

== Reception ==
=== Critical reception ===
The movie was panned by critics, with Pallabi Dey Purkayastha of The Times of India awarding it one out of five stars, writing, "Had it not been for the e-ticketing portals, the audience would have struggled to successfully identify the genre of this movie – yes, it is that haphazard. From black magic and reincarnation to paranormal elements and eternal love, the director of the movie, Shravan Kumar, seems to have tried it all but nothing really works." She, however, noted that veterans like Divya Dutta and Atul Kulkarni try their best, but look uninterested after a point.

Similarly Indian Express called it "a drab whodunnit."
