= Luv U Soniyo =

- Movie poster
- Directed by: Joe Rajan
- Produced by: Harsh jain; Gautam Buragohain; Shivkumar Parthasarathy
- Starring: Tanuj Virwani; Neha Hinge
- Cinematography: Kalpesh Bhandarkar
- Edited by: Deven Murudeshwar
- Music by: Vipin Patwa
- Production companies: Tipping Point Films; 52 Weeks Entertainment; Odyssey Corporation; Harvey India Productions
- Distributed by: Viacom 18 Motion Pictures
- Release date: 26 July 2013
- Country: India
- Language: Hindi
- Box office: ₹27 million (US$320,000)

Luv U Soniyo (transl. Love you beautiful) is a 2013 Hindi romance film directed by Joe Rajan and produced by Viacom 18, Harsh Jain Beena Hemanshu Mehta and Joe Rajan. Creative Producers – Gautam Buragohain, Shivkumar Parthasarathy. Cinematography by Kalpesh Bhandarkar. Mark and Soniyo, who after having been brought together by fate have to win over their parents consent. Their cultures clash in every possible way and just when fate decides to turn the game around, all they have is their faith in each other and a little help from their friends. The film features Tanuj Virwani and Neha Hinge as main characters.

== Cast ==
- Tanuj Virwani as Mark Briganza
- Neha Hinge as Soniyo
- Jatin Grewal as Vikram
- Aaditya Shivkumar
- Daniyal Malik
- Vivek Vaswani
- Howard Rosemeyer
- Suresh Menon
- Farida Dadi
- Tarak Miah
- Avtar Gill as Neha's Dad
- Apurva Ratan as Babloo
- Arbab Umar as Bunty(Neha's cousin brother)

== Songs ==
- "Tumsa Nahi Koi" – KK, Anwesha Sarkar
- "Pyar Tera" – Sonu Nigam
- "Luv U Soniyo" – Remo Fernandes
- "Chalo Chalte Hai Mexico" – Shaan
- "You're My Valentine" – Sonu Nigam, Joy, Sunidhi Chauhan
- "Palko Pe Phool" – Shaan, Shreya Ghoshal
- "Pyar Tera" (Unplugged) – Sonu Nigam
