= Sonal Parihar =

Indian television actress

- Occupation: Actress
- Years active: 2012-present

Sonal Parihar is an Indian television actress. She has appeared in the serials Bade Achhe Lagte Hain,Kaisa Yeh Ishq Hai... Ajab Sa Risk Hai, Adaalat, and Chakravartin Ashoka Samrat. She was also seen in Star Plus's Yeh Hai Mohabbatein. She appeared as Satyabhama in the series Sankat Mochan Mahabali Hanumaan.

In 2017, she played the role of Amrita Choudhary in Meri Durga. She then appeared in Vighnaharta Ganesh as Sumohini.

== Filmography ==
Year	Film	Role	Notes
2012	Savdhaan India		
2012	Bade Achhe Lagte Hain	Jhanvi	
2015	Adaalat	Anjali	
2015	Chakravartin Ashoka Samrat	Nirjara	
2014-2016	CID	Anita	
2016	Crime Patrol	Kajri Mishra	
2016	Crime Patrol	Aarti Dixit	
2015-2017	Sankat Mochan Mahabali Hanumaan	Satyabhama	
2016	Yeh Hai Mohabbatein	Mihika	Later replaced by Avantika Hundal
2016	Amma	Ghazzala	
2017	Rudra Ke Rakshak	Rukmini	
2017	Meri Durga	Amrita	
2018-2019	Vighnaharta Ganesh	Sumohini	
2019	Laal Ishq	Kiran	
2021	Tandoor (web series)	Rashi	
2020	Dil Jaise Dhadke... Dhadakne Do	Aparna	
2020	Jag Janani Maa Vaishno Devi – Kahani Mata Rani Ki	Naulakha	
2022	Crime World		
2022	Dharm Yoddha Garud	Rati	
2023	Tulsidham Ke Laddu Gopal	Rati	
2023	Crimes Aaj Kal		
