= Monica (2011 film) =

- Directed by: Sushen Bhatnagar
- Written by: Sushen Bhatnagar
- Produced by: Kush Bhargava
- Starring: Divya Dutta; Ashutosh Rana; Rajit Kapur
- Cinematography: Chandan Goswami
- Edited by: Santosh Kumar; Aadesh Verma
- Music by: Raju Rao
- Distributed by: Aj Media Corporation
- Release date: 2011
- Running time: 119 minutes
- Country: India
- Language: Hindi

Monica is a 2011 Indian Hindi-language drama film written and directed by Sushen Bhatnagar, starring Divya Dutta, Ashutosh Rana and Rajit Kapur, and produced by Anup Jalota and Kush Bhargava. It is directed by Sushen Bhatnagar and is inspired from real life incidents such as the Shivani Bhatnagar murder case and the 2G spectrum case.

== Plot ==
The film traces the story of Monica Jaitley, who is an ambitious woman who wants to rise to the top at any cost. She has had a tormented life as a child, as she was sexually abused in her childhood. Leaving her horrid past behind, she falls in love with journalist Raj Jaitley. They do get married; however, they have an unhappy married life. She becomes a journalist herself, and this creates a rift between them. The story traces her rise to the top and the compromises she ends up making and their impact on her personal life.

== Cast ==
- Divya Dutta ... Monica Jaitley (Journalist)
- Rajit Kapur ... Raj Jaitley (Monica's husband)
- Ashutosh Rana ... Chandrakant Pandit (Politician)
- Kitu Gidwani ... Pamela Grewal (Industrialist)
- Yashpal Sharma ... Public Prosecutor Mathur
- Tinnu Anand ... Assem Ray
- Kunickaa Sadanand ... Judge Shanti
- Yatin Karyekar ... M.J.
- Mithilesh Chaturvedi ... Defence Lawyer Abhinav Pathak
- Saurabh Dubey ... Shrikant Vohra
- Dadhey Pandey ... Sandeep Mishra (Broker)
- Anil Rastogi ... Mr Jaitley, Monica's Father
- Veda Rakesh ... Mrs Jaitley, Monica's Mother
- Padam Singh ... Gopinath Pandey
- Zarine Viccajee ... House Owner - Nainita

== Reception ==
Mahesh Bhatt tweeted, "Monica is a brave film, and Divya Dutta bears her soul on the screen like Shabana Azmi once did in the movie Arth".

Indian Express review - "Monica has the intention, and a couple of effective performances, but doesn't keep up with its execution."

Hindustan Times - Mayank Shekhar gave it 1/5 stars

The Times of India gave it 3/5 stars and a decent review - "Don't be mislead by the title and don't be foxed by the low key publicity. This one's truly a surprise. Check it out."
