= Masti Express =

2011 Indian Hindi-language comedy film

- Poster
- Directed by: Vikram Pradhan
- Written by: Vikram Pradhan
- Starring: Rajpal Yadav; Divya Dutta; Johny Lever
- Cinematography: Dhananjay Kulkarni
- Edited by: Gaurav Meshram
- Music by: Chinar–Mahesh (songs); Gulraj Singh (score)
- Release date: 18 February 2011
- Country: India
- Language: Hindi

Masti Express is a 2011 Indian Hindi-language sports comedy film directed by Vikram Pradhan and starring Rajpal Yadav, Divya Dutta and Johny Lever.

== Cast ==
- Rajpal Yadav as Raju
- Divya Dutta as Seema
- Johny Lever as Veerubhai
- Razak Khan as Salim
- Vijay Patkar as Pappu
- Rajkumar Kanojia as Chakli
- Manoj Joshi
- Mushtaq Khan
- Hemant Pandey
- Rajesh Vivek
- Uday Sabnis
- Balwinder Singh Suri
- Ryan Pinto as a student
- Sameer Khan
- Rohan
- Faraaz
- Babita
- Eric Nanda
- Shankar Mahadevan (cameo appearance)
- Kashmera Shah (cameo appearance)
- Ali Asgar (cameo appearance)

== Soundtrack ==
The songs were composed by Chinar–Mahesh. Lyrics by Manoj Yadav.

- "Manzilon Ke Liye Manzil Ban Jayega Woh" - Shankar Mahadevan
- "Jiya Pe Daaka Daal Doongi" - Sunidhi Chauhan
- "Kuchh Sochna Nahin Hai (Ma Kasam Yeh Hai Yaaran Da Tashan)" - Kailash Kher

== Reception ==
Taran Adarsh of Bollywood Hungama wrote that "Quite an interesting idea, I must add, but interesting ideas don't necessarily translate into fascinating cinematic experiences". Komal Nahta of Koimoi wrote that "On the whole, Masti Express is too dull to impress at the box-office". A critic from The Times of India wrote that "Funny only in bits and pieces, Masti Express doesn't live up to its name". A critic from Webdunia rated the film 2 out of 5. A critic from Movie Talkies wrote that "Unfortunately, the report card for Vikram Pradhan’s directorial debut reads ‘FAIL’. Ultimately, ‘Masti Express’ is a film thoroughly derailed".

== Home media ==
The film premiered on Zee Cinema on 27 March 2011.
