= Aazam =

- Directed by: Shravan Tiwari
- Screenplay by: Shravan Tiwari
- Story by: Shravan Tiwari
- Dialogue by: Shravan Tiwari
- Starring: Jimmy Sheirgill; Abhimanyu Singh; Indraneil Sengupta; Govind Namdev; Raza Murad
- Cinematography: Ranjit Sahu
- Edited by: Shravan Tiwari
- Music by: Natraj Dastidar
- Production company: BMX Motion Pictures
- Release date: 26 May 2023
- Country: India
- Language: Hindi

Aazam is a 2023 Indian Hindi language film, written and directed by Shravan Tiwari. The film features Jimmy Sheirgill, Abhimanyu Singh, Indraneil Sengupta and Raza Murad.

== Synopsis ==
Aazam is a crime thriller revolves around the underworld gang who controls the syndicate in the city. Aazam is about the succession battle of mafia don Nawab Khan which revolves around conspiracy, betrayal and deceit.

== Cast ==
- Jimmy Sheirgill as Javed
- Abhimanyu Singh as Kadar
- Indraneil Sengupta as DCP Ajay Joshi
- Raza Murad as Nawab
- Sanjeev Tyagi as PSI Ankit More
- Alok Pandey as Vishal, Javed's friend
- Govind Namdev as Pratab Shetty
- Sayaji Shinde as Madan Shikre
- Ali Khan as Shakir Shaikh
- Anang Desai as Firoz Namazi
- Mushtaq Khan as Tatiya
- Vivek Ghamande as Annya
- Inzmam as Murad
- Alok Pandey as Vishal
- Sushant Jain as Azaz
- Khushi solanki as Rajjo

== Production ==
Produced under the banner of BMX motion picture, Aazam is a crime thriller. T. B. Patel is the producer. Shravan Tiwari has also given the screenplay and dialogue to the film. Music by Natraj Dastidar and lyrics by Nawab Arzoo. The film has been shot in Mumbai.

== Soundtrack ==
The music of the film is composed by Nataraj Dastidar and Durga Natraj. The lyrics are written by Nawab Aarzoo.

No.	Title	Singer(s)	Length
1.	"Allah Ve Maula Ve"	Kailash Kher	3:19
Total length:			3:19
