= Tanuj Virwani =

Indian actor and model (born 1986)

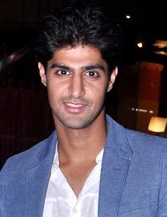
- Virwani at an event for Luv U Soniyo, 2013
- Born: 29 November 1986 (age 39); Delhi, India
- Occupations: Actor; model
- Years active: 2013–present
- Spouse: Tanya Jacob (m. 2023)
- Mother: Rati Agnihotri
- Relatives: Atul Agnihotri (uncle); Alizeh Agnihotri (cousin)

Tanuj Virwani is an Indian actor and model active in the Bollywood industry. He is best known for his role of Vayu Raghavan in the 2017 Amazon Original television series Inside Edge. He has also played integral roles in Alt Balaji's Code M opposite Jennifer Winget and ZEE5's most successful show Poison. He has earlier started opposite Sunny Leone in the racy thriller One Night Stand. Along with being an actor he has shown a keen interest towards direction and writing and has made several socially relevant short films. He was recently seen in second season of popular web series Illegal of Voot Select.

== Early life ==
Virwani was born on 29 November 1986 in Delhi to businessman and architect Anil Virwani, a Sindhi Hindu and to 80's famous Bollywood actress Rati Agnihotri, a Punjabi Brahmin.

== Career ==
He is the son of actress Rati Agnihotri. He started his Bollywood career with Luv U Soniyo, a Hindi movie in 2013, directed by Joe Rajan. He next appeared in 2014 film Purani Jeans directed by Tanushri Chatterji Bassu opposite Izabelle Leite and Aditya Seal.

He next appeared in Jasmine Moses D'souza's One Night Stand opposite Sunny Leone, released in May 2016, then in the 2017 Amazon series Inside Edge, followed by an appearance in celebrity reality TV show Box Cricket League.

He ventured onto the digital medium with the Emmy nominated series Inside Edge in 2017. He then followed that up with the ZEE5 original Poison which turned out to be a massive hit. He also costarred on Alt Balaji's Code M opposite Jennifer Winget. He also played Don character in Disney+ Hotstar original The Tattoo murders opposite Meera Chopra. Tanuj also seen in Murder Meri Jaan opposite Barkha Singh its a comedy thriller web series on Disney+ Hotstar in 2021. In the same year, he was paired opposite Rashami Desai to play the negative role of Sahil Sharma in Nivedita Basu's crime thriller Tandoor.

== Filmography ==
=== Films ===
Year	Title	Role	Notes
2013	Luv U Soniyo	Mark Briganza	
2014	Purani Jeans	Sidharth "Sid" Ray	
2016	One Night Stand	Urvil Raisingh	
2024	Yodha	Sameer Khan	
2025	Let's Meet	Nikhil	

=== Television ===
Year	Title	Role	Notes	Ref
2018	Box Cricket League	Contestant		
2024	MTV Splitsvilla 15	Host		

=== Web series ===
Year	Title	Role	Notes	Ref.
2017–present	Inside Edge	Vayu Raghavan		
2018	Jigsaw	Ronny	Producer	
2018	Scent of a Women	Stranger		
2018	Riha		Director, producer	
2018	Naash		Director, producer, editor	
2019	Fuh Se Fantasy	Tahir		
2019	Poison	Ranveer		
2020–2022	Code M	Angad Sandhu		
2020	Urban Incarceration			
2020	Illegal - Justice, Out of Order	Raghav		
2020	Masaba Masaba	Manav		
2020	Lips Don't Lie	Karan		
2021	The Tattoo Murders	Prahar Pratap		
2021	Tandoor	Sahil Sharma		
2021	Murder Meri Jaan	Aditya		
2021	Cartel	Major Bhau		
2024	Murshid	Kumar Pratap		
2025	Rana Naidu	Chirag Oberoi	Netflix series	
