= Tandoor (TV series) =

Indian web series

- Genre: Crime thriller
- Written by: Ribhu Mishra
- Directed by: Nivedita Basu
- Starring: Rashami Desai; Tanuj Virwani
- Composers: Ankit Shah; Shubhankar Banerjee
- Country of origin: India
- Original languages: Hindi; English
- No. of seasons: 1
- No. of episodes: 5

Production
- Producers: Nivedita Basu; Chitra Vakil Sharma; Chandni Soni
- Production locations: Mumbai, India
- Editor: Shlok Bhandari

Original release
- Network: MX Player; Ullu
- Release: 23 July 2021

Tandoor is an Indian Hindi-language web series directed by Nivedita Basu. It features Rashami Desai, Tanuj Virwani and Amitriyaan in the lead roles. Loosely inspired from the infamous 1995 real life incident, the series revolves around a married couple whose lives take an unexpected turn when a friend enters into wife's life leading to her murder. The shooting wrapped up in November 2020. The series released on 23 July 2021 on Voot, MX Player and Ullu App.

== Premise ==
Based on the spine-chilling Tandoor case in Delhi, the show reconstructs the events before and after the gruesome murder of a woman by her own husband.

== Cast and characters ==
Main

- Rashami Desai as Palak Sahni/Palak Sharma
- Tanuj Virwani as Sahil Sharma
- Amitriyaan as Aiyaaz

Recurring

- Ravi Gossain as Abdul Razzak
- Vijay Kadechkar as Charan Singh
- Sonal Parihar as Rashi
- Kamal Malik as Robert Pereira
- Hirdeyjeet Jarnail Singh as Bahubali Mishra
- Yuvraj Haral as DCP Shenoy
- Utkarsh Gaharwar as Kanhaiya Shukla
- Jeevan Shetty as Vijay
- Simran Poojary
- Amber Wasi
- Harshita Bist
- Afsar Adil

== Episodes ==
No.	Title	Directed by	Written by	Original release date
1	"Tandoor Kaand!"	Nivedita Basu	Ribhu Mishra	23 July 2021
2	"Pyaar Ya Takraar"	Nivedita Basu	Ribhu Mishra	23 July 2021
3	"Pati, Patni Aur Woh?"	Nivedita Basu	Ribhu Mishra	23 July 2021
4	"Ladai Ka Nishana"	Nivedita Basu	Ribhu Mishra	23 July 2021
5	"Junoon, Ek Saza?"	Nivedita Basu	Ribhu Mishra	23 July 2021

== Production ==
=== Casting ===
Tanuj Virwani had been in talks for Tandoor with Nivedita Basu for a long time. Around March 2020 when they were planning to take the next step, lockdown due to COVID-19 was implemented. Things between them picked up again around August–September. Dates at that time became a concern as Virwani was stuck in continuity on another project and Basu needed him to look a certain way. However, due to forced halt on the other project for some reason, he was able to change his look as Basu wanted. So he gained some weight, grew his hair and facial hair for the role.

On the other hand, Basu had initial plans to cast Rashami Desai for another project. However, Vibhu Agarwal, the CEO of Ullu, was very keen on getting Desai on board for the series. Upon narration, Desai found the script intriguing and immediately took up the project.

=== Filming ===
The series was originally supposed to be shot in Delhi but due to COVID -19 Pandemic the plan changed and it was entirely shot in Mumbai, India. The series went on floors soon after the COVID-19 lockdown restrictions were lifted in Maharastra and the government gave a green signal for shootings to resume. A stringent shoot of 14 days was planned and executed with a plenty of precautions in order to ensure that COVID-19 stayed at bay from filming sets. The filming wrapped up in November 2020. Assistant Directors - Jagpreet Khokar, Rahul Dubey, Ravi, Himanshu Singh.

== Marketing and release ==
Rashami Desai unveiled the first poster of Tandoor on 7 March 2021 via her Instagram handle. The trailer was released on YouTube on 12 July.

== Reception ==
Ronak Kotecha gave the series 3 stars in his review for The Times of India, and wrote "Tandoor surely grabs your curiosity and manages to build on the suspense. This despite the fact that we know the outcome of the case yet it is exciting to watch the mystery unfold." Tandoor was also nominated in filmfare OTT 2021 under Best webseries category.

== Awards and nominations ==
Award	Category	Recipient(s) and nominee(s)	Result
Midday IIIA Awards (2022)	Best Debut Actress In A Web Series	Rashami Desai	Won
IIFTA Awards (2023)	Stellar Performer of the Year	Rashami Desai	Won
