= Ishq Mein Jeena Ishq Mein Marna =

- Directed by: Mahrukh Mirzaa
- Written by: Rasheed Khan; Dialogues; Jalees Sherwani
- Produced by: Mahrukh Mirzaa
- Starring: Ravi Sagar; Divya Dutta; Aasif Sheikh; Dalip Tahil; Brij Gopal; Shafi Inamdar; Raju Srivastav; Kuldeep Malik; Mohammad Abbas Naqvi
- Cinematography: Deepak Duggal
- Edited by: Sakharam Borasay
- Music by: Shyam-Surender
- Production company: Sangeet Films Pvt. Ltd.
- Release date: 24 June 1994
- Running time: 134 minutes
- Language: Hindi

Ishq Mein Jeena Ishq Mein Marna (transl. Live and die in love) is a 1994 Indian Hindi-language romance film produced and directed by Mahrukh Mirzaa, starring debutant actors Ravi Sagar and Divya Dutta. The film was much hyped at that time and was given Tax exemption in Uttar Pradesh, but was an overall box office failure.

== Summary ==
Sapna, daughter of a wealthy father Mr. Kapoor, goes out with her friends for an outing to Nainital. There she meets a young tour guide Suraj. Meanwhile, Mr. Kapoor sends his friend's son Manish, returning from the US, to Nainital to meet Sapna, so that they can get to know each other before their marriage, but as time goes by Sapna and Suraj fall in love. Frustrated, Manish, one day abducts Sapna and tries to rape her. Suraj saves her, but Manish gets killed in an accident. Suraj is now arrested and is tortured by police in lockup. Manish's father bribes the police to kill Suraj in a fake encounter, but Suraj is saved by his friend Pashah and Sapna. They flee from the spot as the whole of Nainital is under surveillance of the police to trace Suraj and Sapna as they are on the run for their lives.

== Cast ==
- Ravi Sagar - Suraj
- Divya Dutta - Sapna
- Aasif Sheikh- Inspector Bhure Lal Yadav
- Kuldeep Malik - Manish
- Dalip Tahil - Mr. Kapoor
- Shafi Inamdar---Uncle
- Raju Srivastav - Pashaa

== Music ==
Lyrics provided by Gauhar Kanpuri and Sateesh.

1. " Are Baba Yeh Dil Kyon Machalne Laga" - Kumar Sanu, Sadhana Sargam
2. "Chali Gayee Jaan Meri" - Shabbir Kumar
3. "Chehra Tumhara Kitna Hai Pyara" - Kumar Sanu
4. "Kisi Se Mujhe Pyar Ho" - Kumar Sanu, Sadhana Sargam
5. "Kisi Se Mujhe Pyar Ho II" - Babul Supriyo
6. "Milta Na Pyar Jo Tera" - Kumar Sanu
7. "Ruk Ja Mere Chhaila Tu" - Sadhana Sargam
