= Murshid (TV series) =

Indian Hindi-language web-series

- Written by: Shravan Tiwari
- Directed by: Shravan Tiwari
- Starring: Kay Kay Menon; Tanuj Virwani; Anang Desai; Rajesh Shringarpure; Karmveer Choudhary
- Music by: Kunal Karan
- Country of origin: India
- Original language: Hindi
- No. of episodes: 7

Production
- Producers: Sachin Bansal, Sandip Patel
- Cinematography: Parvez Pathan; Ranjit Sahu
- Production companies: Fathom Pictures; Pramukh Film Production House

Original release
- Network: ZEE5
- Release: 30 August 2024

Murshid is Hindi crime thriller series directed by Shravan Tiwari and produced by Sachin Bansal, Sandip Patel for ZEE5. The series features Kay Kay Menon in a titular role. Murshid also stars Tanuj Virwani, Jameel Chaudhary, Zakir Hussain, Anang Desai, Karamveer Choudhary, Vedika Bhandari, and Rajesh Shringarpure. The series was released on 30 August 2024.

== Plot ==
The retired gangster Murshid Pathan is forced to return to his criminal roots when his family is threatened. Meanwhile, a police officer, Kumar Pratap Rana, is investigating a case that involves his father, Murshid. As the plot unfolds, the truth about Murshid's past and the officer's involvement in the case is revealed.

== Cast ==
- Kay Kay Menon as Murshid Pathan
- Tanuj Virwani as Kumar Pratap Rana
- Satyyaa Patel as News Reporter
- Zakir Hussain as Farid
- Anang Desai
- Rajesh Shringarpure as Jayendra
- Karmveer Choudhary as Namdev Kulkarni
- Aamirr Khan as Bunty
- Nandish Bhatt as Iqbal

== Marketing ==
The trailer was released a day later.

== Reception ==
ABP News rated it 3 out of 5 and commented, "These seven episodes of gangster drama keep the audience's attention on hold till the climax." Ronak Kotecha of The Times of India rated it 3.5 out of 5 and wrote in his review, "One of the standout aspects of 'Murshid' is its setting. The backdrop of South Mumbai, with its gritty streets and looming underworld, lends the show an authentic 90s grunge..." Sakshi Verma of India TV too rated it 3 out 5 and commented, "It appears that writer and director Shravan Tiwari has worked hard to create a realistic sense of the plot." Times Now also gave it a 3.5 out of 5.

Deepa Gahlot of Rediff.com rated 2/5 stars and notes "The pace of the show and the many twists do keep up the interest of the viewer, even if most of what goes on is implausible. Everything is simply designed to prove what an indestructible force Murshid is, probably in the hope of a Season 2." Scroll.in commented, "Murshid is salvaged by a few sharp performances and a welcome intent to wrap up matters with seven episodes."
