= Purani Jeans =

2014 film directed by Tanushri Chattrji Bassu

- Theatrical release poster
- Directed by: Tanushri Chattrji Bassu
- Written by: Tanushri Chattrji Bassu
- Produced by: Manju Lulla
- Starring: Aditya Seal; Tanuj Virwani; Izabelle Leite
- Cinematography: Sunil Patel; Christo Bakalov
- Edited by: Apurva Motiwale; Ashish Mhatre
- Music by: Ram Sampath
- Production company: Eros International
- Release date: 2 May 2014
- Country: India
- Language: Hindi

Purani Jeans (transl. Old jeans) is a 2014 Indian Hindi-language coming-of-age drama film directed by Tanushri Chattrji Bassu. The film stars Tanuj Virwani and Izabelle Leite. It tells the story of a young boy who returns to his hometown and reconnects with his old friends. The soundtrack was composed by Ram Sampath. The first look at the film was revealed on 8 March 2014, and the film's release was on 2 May 2014.

== Plot ==
As an adult, Sid's mother dies. He collects his lost bag at an airport, where a girl from a publishing house tells him that she read his diary and that he is quite a writer, which revives some old memories for him. He then goes to India to sell his mother's cottage in Kasauli. Sid finds himself looking back at a past that has haunted him for years.

In a flashback, all 4 self-proclaimed cowboys execute the plans to welcome their hero Sam (Aditya Seal). They then go to the station to welcome him, where Sid (Tanuj Virwani) runs into Nayantara (Izabelle Leite). Then, feeling sorry for themselves they begin to make their way home when they are struck by a black car. After chasing the car it is revealed that it is Sam. He apologises to Zizo and promises to fix his father's car.

They begin their fun by partying and throwing eggs at everyone's house. Sam's relationship with Sid's mom is very strong. Sam's father left him when he was six and in shock of it, in shock over it, his mother became an alcoholic and remarried.

After a few days, Sid runs into Nayantara in a music store; he begins to fall for her. Sam meets and falls for Nayantara in a club with her sister. Also Bobby is shown dancing with her sister.

The flashbacks eventually lead to the revelation that Sam committed suicide for which Sid thinks of himself as the cause. Sam's death was due to his troubled past and his relationship with his mother, not because of his best friend Sid. Upon finding this out, Sid and Nayantara reunite.

There is a reunion between the remaining cowboys as they remember the past and the cherished moments they spent with each other and with their friend Sam, because if Sam were alive, that is exactly what he would've done, as some friendships last forever.

== Cast ==
- Aditya Seal as Samuel Joseph Lawrence “Sam”
- Tanuj Virwani as Siddharth “Sid” Ray aka Siddhu
- Izabelle Leite as Nayantara Sapru
- Param Baidwaan as Bal Singh Shekawat "Bobby"
- Raghav Raj Kakker as Susheel Sharma "Suzy"
- Kashyap kapoor as Tejinder Singh Kathuria "Tino"
- Sarika as Sherry Lawrence (Sam's Mother)
- Rati Agnihotri as Monica Ray, Siddarth's Mother
- Sammy Durrani as Tanya Sachdev
- Swati Pansare as Susheel's Mother
- Manoj Pahwa
- Rajit Kapur as Abhijeet, Sam's step-father
- Kamini Kaushal
- Kashika Chopra as Ayesha

== Production ==
The teaser of Purani Jeans was released on 17 March 2014, while the theatrical trailer was released on 19 March 2014. The song Dil aaj kal was shot in Panchgani hostel named Fidai Academy on 27 October 2013.

== Soundtrack ==
Purani Jeans

Soundtrack album by Ram Sampath
- Released: 2 April 2014
- Genre: Feature film soundtrack
- Length: 40:19
- Language: Hindi
- Label: Eros International
External audio
- Audio Jukebox on YouTube

Purani Jeans music is composed by Ram Sampath.

Purani Jeans Soundtrack
No.	Title	Singer(s)	Length
1.	"Yaari Yaari"	Ram Sampath	03:22
2.	"Dil Aaj Kal"	KK	05:20
3.	"Out of Control"	Mika Singh, Suzanne D'Mello, Deane Sequeira	04:04
4.	"Yeh Beetey Din"	Ram Sampath, Munna Dhiman	03:57
5.	"Jind Meriye"	Navraj Hans	04:15
6.	"Yeh Beetey Din (Acoustic Version)"	Kumar Sanu	03:33
7.	"Dil Aaj Kal (Acoustic Version)"	Sona Mohapatra	04:15
Total length:			28:57
