= Prem Panicker =

Indian cricket journalist

Prem Panicker is an Indian cricket journalist. He is one of the co-founders of The Peepli Project along with Aarti Kumar-Rao and Kalyan Varma, that is now looking for funding.

He was one of a handful of journalists who helped found Rediff (Nasdaq: REDF). He was based in New York City, as editor of India Abroad, the largest Indian-American newspaper, after that paper was bought by Rediff. He was Yahoo! India's Managing Editor for five years before he quit in 2014. Currently, he is based in Bangalore.

He translated the book, Randamoozham from Malayalam in the serialized form on his blog. The original explores the Mahabharata, through the viewpoint of Bhima. This was converted into a book in the form of a single PDF document for free, called Bhimsen, in 2009.
