= Varun Joshi =

Indian television actor (born 1996)

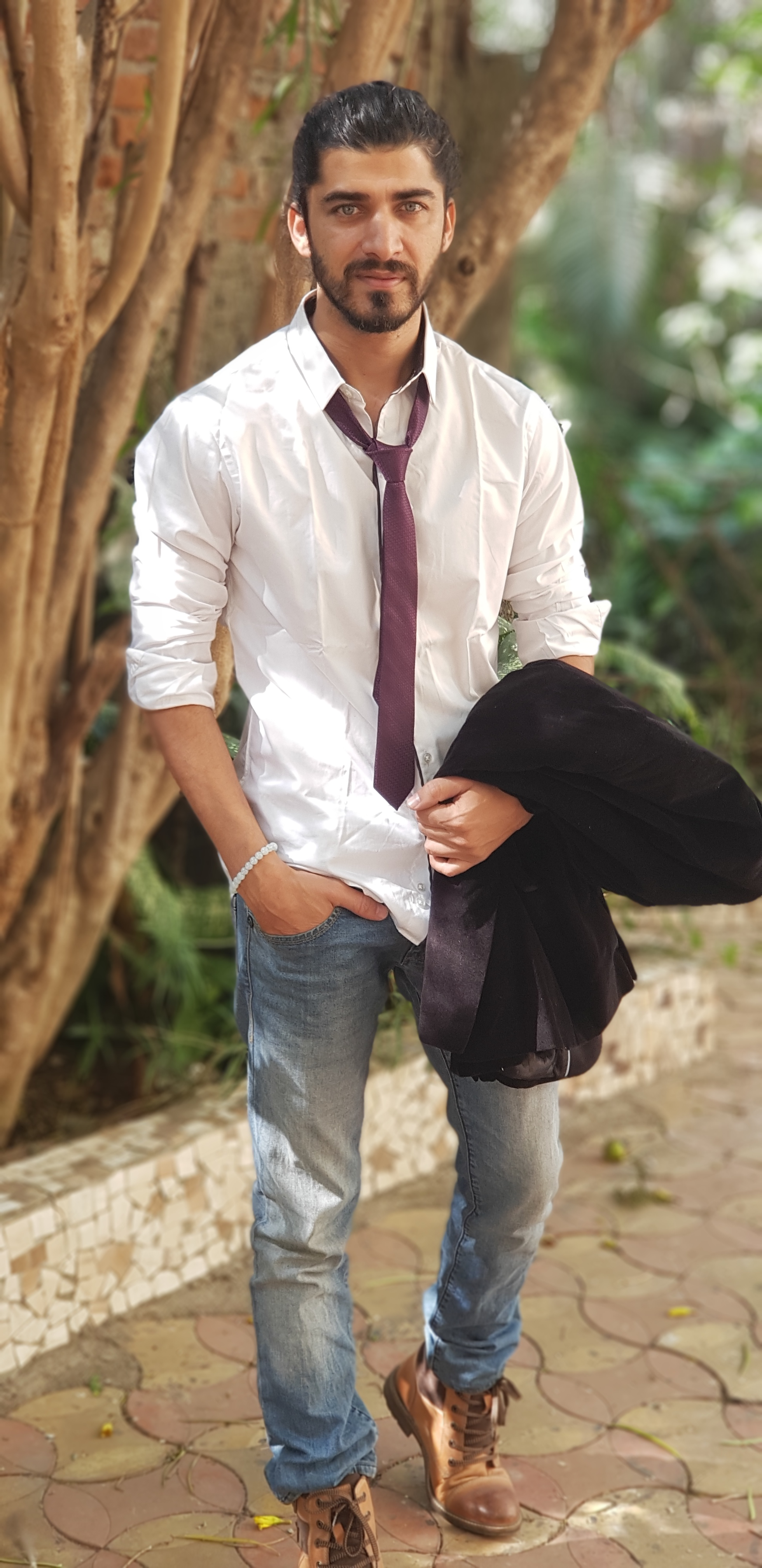
- Born: 20 May 1996 (age 30); Lucknow, India
- Occupation: Actor
- Years active: 2018–present
- Known for: Kumkum Bhagya, Yeh Hai Mohabbatein, Shrimad Bhagwat Mahapuran, Vighnaharta Ganesh
- Parents: Deepak Raj Joshi (father); Santosh Joshi (mother)

Varun Joshi (born 20 May 1996) is an Indian actor and model known for Yeh Hai Mohabbatein, Kumkum Bhagya, Vighnaharta Ganesh, Shrimad Bhagwat Mahapuran, Kundali Bhagya and Bepannah. Varun Joshi has made notable contributions to the film industry. He played a significant role as the second lead in the movie "Raebareli" and portrayed the main villain in "Pyara Kulhad" alongside Gulshan Grover. Additionally, he showcased his talent as a negative lead, Dhundhkari in the series Vighnaharta Ganesh.

== Early life and career ==
Born and raised in Lucknow, Joshi pursued further education at St. Paul's College and Kendriya Vidyalaya, Indira Nagar, before embarking on his engineering studies at Azad Institute of Engineering and Technology.

He received his early education from St. Paul's School Lucknow. He was also a Software Engineer and work with a prestigious multinational corporations including HCL, Dell, Mindtree, and Tech Mahindra. Varun Joshi, known for his portrayal of Manish in the popular television drama Yeh Hai Mohabbatein on StarPlus, and in the mythological daily soap Vighnaharta Ganesh on Sony Entertainment Television. He earned recognition as the runner-up in the Mr. Delhi 2017 competition and also clinched the runner-up title in the Mr. North India 2017 contest.

Joshi's journey to acting started with his appearance in the TV serial Bepannah, starring Jennifer Winget and Harshad Chopda.

== Filmography ==
Television Serials
Year	Title	Role	Channel Name	Production House
2018	Bepannah	Dance Choreographer	Colors TV	Cinevistaas Limited
2018	Roop - Mard Ka Naya Swaroop	Dance Instructor	Colors TV	Rashmi Sharma Telefilms Limited
2019	Kumkum Bhagya	Raja	Zee TV	Balaji Telefilms
2019	Kundali Bhagya	Danny	Zee TV	Balaji Telefilms
2019	Shrimad Bhagwat Mahapuran	Vasuki Naag	Colors TV	Saffron Productions
2019	Yeh Hai Mohabbatein	Manish	StarPlus	Balaji Telefilms
2021	Vighnaharta Ganesh	Dhundhkari	Sony Entertainment Television	Contiloe Pictures

Webseries
Year	Title	Production House	Role	OTT Platform
2018	Dubey ji and the Boys	Dreamzz Images Studio	Harpreet	Ullu
2021	The Tattoo murders	Vision Movie Makers	Shailesh Parmar	MX Player

Films
Year	Name	Production House	Role	Ref.
2022	Raebareli	G Media and Film Production	Bunty	
2023	Pyara Kulhad	P.R. Shree Films	Ravi Khanna	
2023	Shashank	N/A	Charan Gauhar 'A Gay'	

Music Videos
Year	Song name	Music label	Ref.
2022	TANHA	Dolly digital	
2023	Jeeya	Sonotek Punjabi	
2023	Raja		
2023	Teri Gali Se	HeartBeatz Music Company	
2024	Jaane Jigar	MX Player	
