= Izabelle Leite =

Brazilian film actress and model

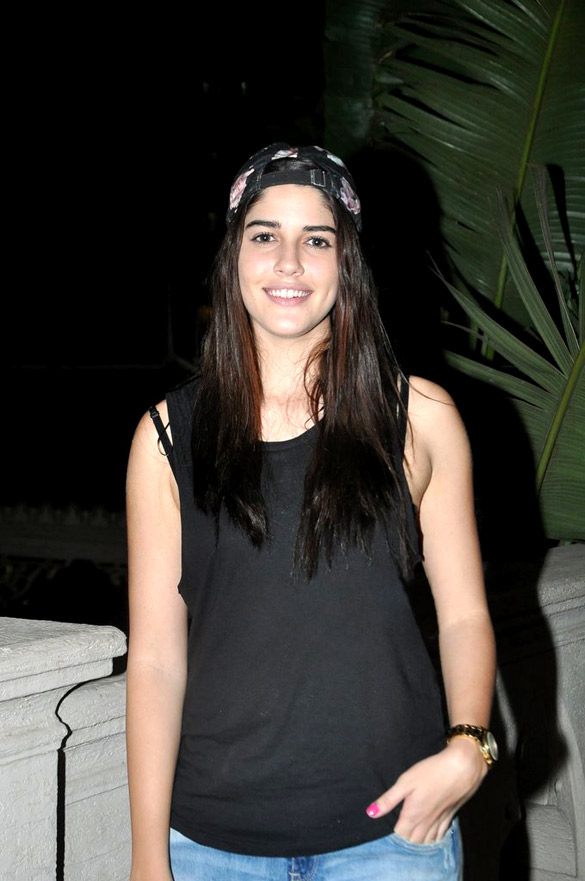
- Born: Izabelle De Farias; 1 September 1990 (age 35); João Pessoa, Paraíba, Brazil
- Occupations: Actress; model
- Years active: 2012–present
- Children: 2

Izabelle Leite (born 1 September 1990) is a Brazilian actress and model. She works predominantly in the Indian film industry.

== Career ==
After debuting in Bollywood with an uncredited appearance in Talaash: The Answer Lies Within, she appeared in Bollywood with a leading role in the teen drama Sixteen (2013). Her third film was the romance Purani Jeans (2016). As a model, she has promoted Lakme beauty products, Procter & Gamble, Big Bazaar and the Pakistani brand Nishat Linen. Leite was nominated for Best Female Debut Actress by the Life Ok Screen Awards 2014 for the movie Sixteen. She also appeared in the music video of Lahore with Guru Randhawa which has reached over 1 billion views on YouTube.

== Filmography ==
Year	Film	Role	Language	Notes
2012	Talaash: The Answer Lies Within	Prostitute	Hindi	Uncredited
2013	Sixteen	Anu	Hindi	
2014	Purani Jeans	Nayantara Sappu	Hindi	
2019	Mr. Majnu	Madhavi	Telugu	
2020	World Famous Lover	Iza	Telugu	
