= Shravan Tiwari =

Indian-American Film Director

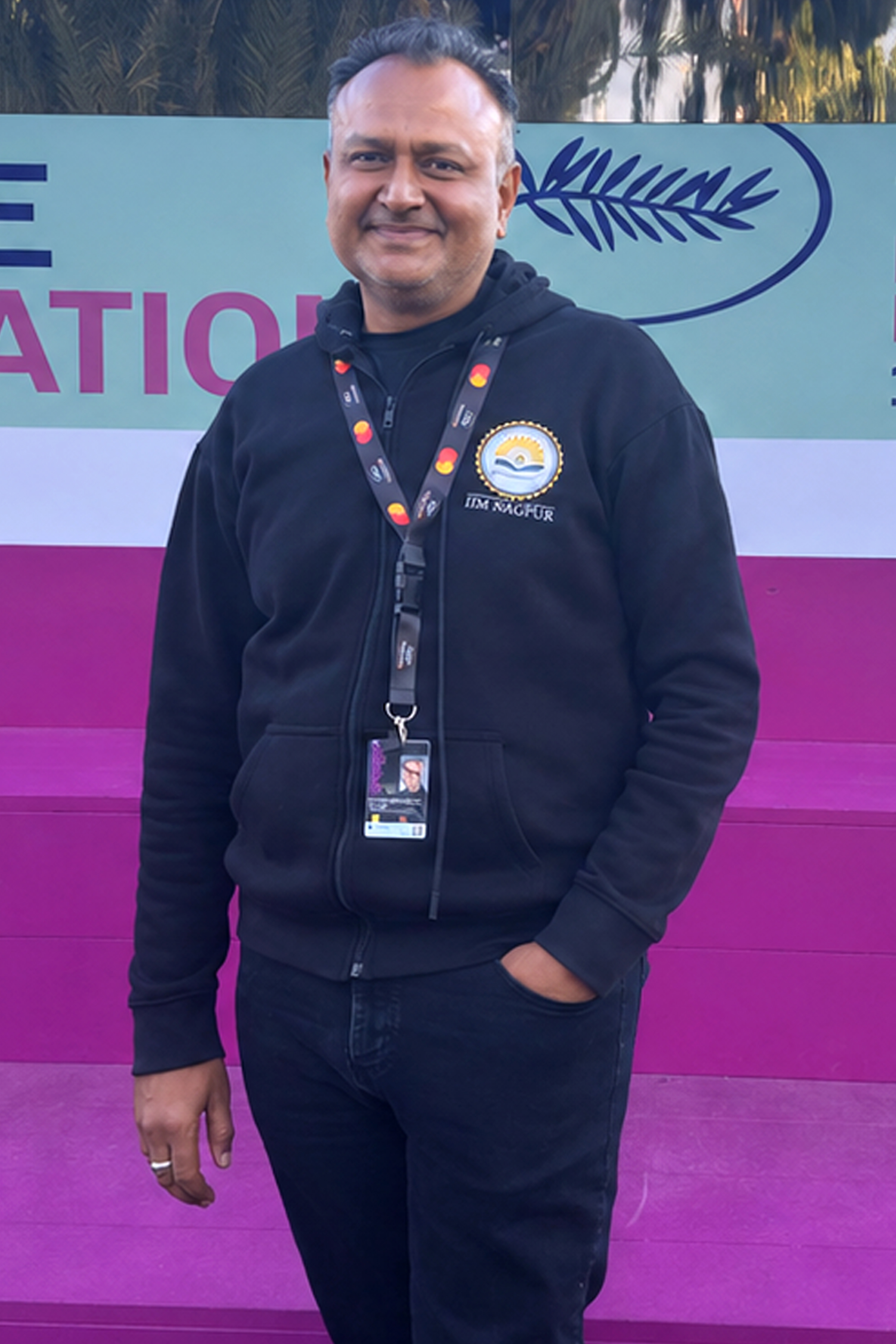
- Cannes Film Festival in 2026
- Born: Shravan Tiwari; 10 December 1972 (age 53); Prayagraj, Uttar Pradesh, India
- Occupation: Film director
- Years active: 2014
- Known for: 706 (film), Aazam and Murshid (TV series)

Shravan Tiwari is an Indian-American filmmaker, screenwriter, and director. He has directed and written films like 706 (film), Aazam and Murshid (TV series)and Holy Ghost (2025 film).

== Career ==
Shravan Tiwari started with the first short Gujarati film Photo frame (2010) and The Advocate (2013). A Hindi feature film The Last Don. It was 2015 theatrical release. The film 706, was released in 2019, was on Netflix.

In 2021 released Hindi web series Kamathipura and The Tattoo Murders on Amazon Prime Video, Hotstar and MX player, Murshid released on Zee5 in 2023 is a Hindi web series. Aazam is a Hindi feature film released in 2023.

== Filmography ==
=== Feature films ===
Year	Title	Director	Writer	Notes/Refs
2014	The Last Don	✓	✓	
2019	706	✓	✓	
2021	The Tattoo Murders	✓	✓	
2022	Kamathipura	✓	✓	
2023	Aazam	✓	✓	
2024	Murshid	✓	✓	
2025	Holy Ghost	✓	✓	
