= British Liquid Crystal Society =

The British Liquid Crystal Society (BLCS) is a charitable trust that has operated since 1985.

== History and activities ==
The British Liquid Crystal Society was founded in 1985; at the time, it was the first such national society in the western hemisphere.

Its purpose is to promote education and research on liquid crystals in the United Kingdom. The Society promotes dissemination of knowledge, education and research into and the study of all facets of the formation, evolution, and science of liquid crystals; their physical, chemical and other properties and functions in all products made therefrom. The Society also holds conferences to discuss the findings of such research.

The Society had also operated an outreach fund which has been used to finance the purchase of apparatus for researchers.

Since 2006, the Society has awarded the Hilsum Medal each year for overall contributions to liquid-crystal science and technology. Another medal awarded by the British Liquid Crystal Society is named after the chemist George Gray.

== See also ==
- International Liquid Crystal Society
