= Anwesha Sarkar =

Colloid scientist and food scientist

- Education: Massey University; Central Food Technological Research Institute; West Bengal University of Animal and Fishery Sciences
- Scientific career
- Workplaces: Nestlé; ETH Zurich; University of Leeds
- Thesis: Behaviour of milk protein-stabilized oil-in-water emulsions in simulated physiological fluids (2010)

Anwesha Sarkar is an Indian food scientist who is a professor of colloids and surfaces at the University of Leeds. Her research considers the mechanisms that underpin biolubrication in soft biological interfaces. She was awarded the 2019 Royal Society of Chemistry Food Group Early Career Medal.

== Early life and education ==
Sarkar studied Dairy Engineering at the West Bengal University of Animal and Fishery Sciences. She moved to the Central Food Technological Research Institute for graduate studies, where she specialised in food technology. After completing her master's degree, Sarkar worked at Nestlé India. In 2007, Sarkar moved to Massey University in Auckland, where she completed a doctorate in colloids. Sarkar then returned to Nestlé, where she worked as an application scientist.

== Research and career ==
In 2014, Sarkar joined the faculty at the University of Leeds. Her research considers the mechanisms that underpin bio-lubrication in soft biological interfaces. In 2019, she was awarded the Royal Society of Chemistry Food Group Early Career Medal.

Sarkar's research has shown that the texture of food plays an important role in whether people feel full. Sarkar has extensively studied lingual papillae, the microstructures on the surface of the tongue. She developed a "tongue simulator" that features 3D printed papillae. To create the tongue simulator she moulded the papillae patten onto the surface of an elastomer. She studied the processes by which people digest chocolate, showing that the taste sensations occur while the chocolate is lubricated. After a solid piece of chocolate is eaten, cocoa particles are released, and fat interacts with the tongue. Her experiments showed that the fat content on the surface was the key factor in determining the texture of chocolate in the mouth. Sarkar's research showed that fat deep within the chocolate plays a limited role in the taste, and could be removed without compromising the chocolate sensation.

== Selected publications ==
- Anwesha Sarkar; Kelvin K.T. Goh; R. Paul Singh; Harjinder Singh (August 2009). "Behaviour of an oil-in-water emulsion stabilized by β-lactoglobulin in an in vitro gastric model". Food Hydrocolloids. 23 (6): 1563–1569. doi:10.1016/j.foodhyd.2008.10.014. ISSN 0268-005X. Wikidata Q58416449.
- Anwesha Sarkar; Kelvin K.T. Goh; Harjinder Singh (July 2009). "Colloidal stability and interactions of milk-protein-stabilized emulsions in an artificial saliva". Food Hydrocolloids. 23 (5): 1270–1278. doi:10.1016/j.foodhyd.2008.09.008. ISSN 0268-005X. Wikidata Q58416450.
- Andrea Araiza-Calahorra; Mahmood Akhtar; Anwesha Sarkar (January 2018). "Recent advances in emulsion-based delivery approaches for curcumin: From encapsulation to bioaccessibility". Trends in Food Science and Technology. 71: 155–169. doi:10.1016/j.tifs.2017.11.009. ISSN 0924-2244. Wikidata Q56331931.
