= Gudiya =

- Born: India
- Died: 2 January 2006; Delhi, India
- Occupation: Housewife
- Known for: Her plight during and after the Kargil War, which received media attention
- Notable work: Subject of the film "Kahaani Gudiya Ki"
- Spouses: Naik Arif (m. 1999 – unknown); * Taufiq (m. 2003 – unknown)
- Children: 1 son

Gudiya (d. 2 January 2006) was an Indian Muslim woman affected by the Kargil war, whose plight was highlighted by the print and electronic media. She was married to a sapper named Naik Arif in 1999, 10 days before he was called on duty to Kargil. Arif disappeared on September 16, 1999, and was later declared an army deserter before authorities realised he was prisoner of war in Pakistan. Because Arif was thought to be dead, Gudiya's relatives married her to a relative whom she had known since childhood, Taufiq on April 20, 2003, and she became pregnant with his child.

When Arif was released by Pakistan in August 2004, he returned home to a warm welcome. Gudiya, who at the time was living with her parents in Kalunda village on the outskirts of Delhi, moved about 75 km away to her in-laws house in Mundali village in the Meerut district of Uttar Pradesh. She told the media at the village panchayat that she wanted return to living with her first husband. The Islamic scholars present in the audience applauded her decision, proclaiming it to be in accordance with Sharia. According to the scholars, her second marriage was illegal, as she had not annulled her previous marriage.

However, an investigation by Rediff revealed that Gudiya had returned to Arif under pressure from him, his family members, the villagers and the religious leaders. In fact, Gudiya herself stated "it was everybody's decision". Gudiya's uncle, Riyasat Ali, said, "she was pressured by the people there. She was not allowed to speak. The clerics told her that she had to follow the Shariat and go to Arif. They said her son would become illegitimate if she did not". Gudiya's second husband, Taufiq, told media that Gudiya had called him five days before the incident. During the call, she had explained she was being pressured by those around her, and that her father had told her he would commit suicide if she did not go back to Arif.

Arif accepted his wife, but expressed uncertainty about her unborn child, saying he might send the child to live with Taufiq. She gave birth to a son a month later, and subsequently developed anaemia and underwent bouts of depression. Fifteen months after the reunion, she died from either sepsis or systemic lupus erythematosus in the Army Research and Referral Hospital in Delhi. Doctors attributed her death to gynecological problems induced by a stillbirth from three months prior. She was buried in Mundali village, and following her death Arif said he would retain custody of her son.

== Film ==
Ad-filmmaker Prabhakar Shukla's first feature film, 'Kahaani Gudiya Ki' is based on the life of Gudiya. He said even though the lady died, the issue that the happenings raised is very much relevant. "My film is not only about what happened with Gudiya, but it's a panoramic view of the entire episode from Gudiya's point of view. That's besides paying homage to her," says Shukla, adding, "Gudiya died due to excessive mental trauma that led to multiple organ failure. Her death is the most tragic part of the entire episode, and the film questions why it happened to her."
