= Jogger's Park =

Public park in Mumbai, India

Coordinates: 19.059°N 72.821°E

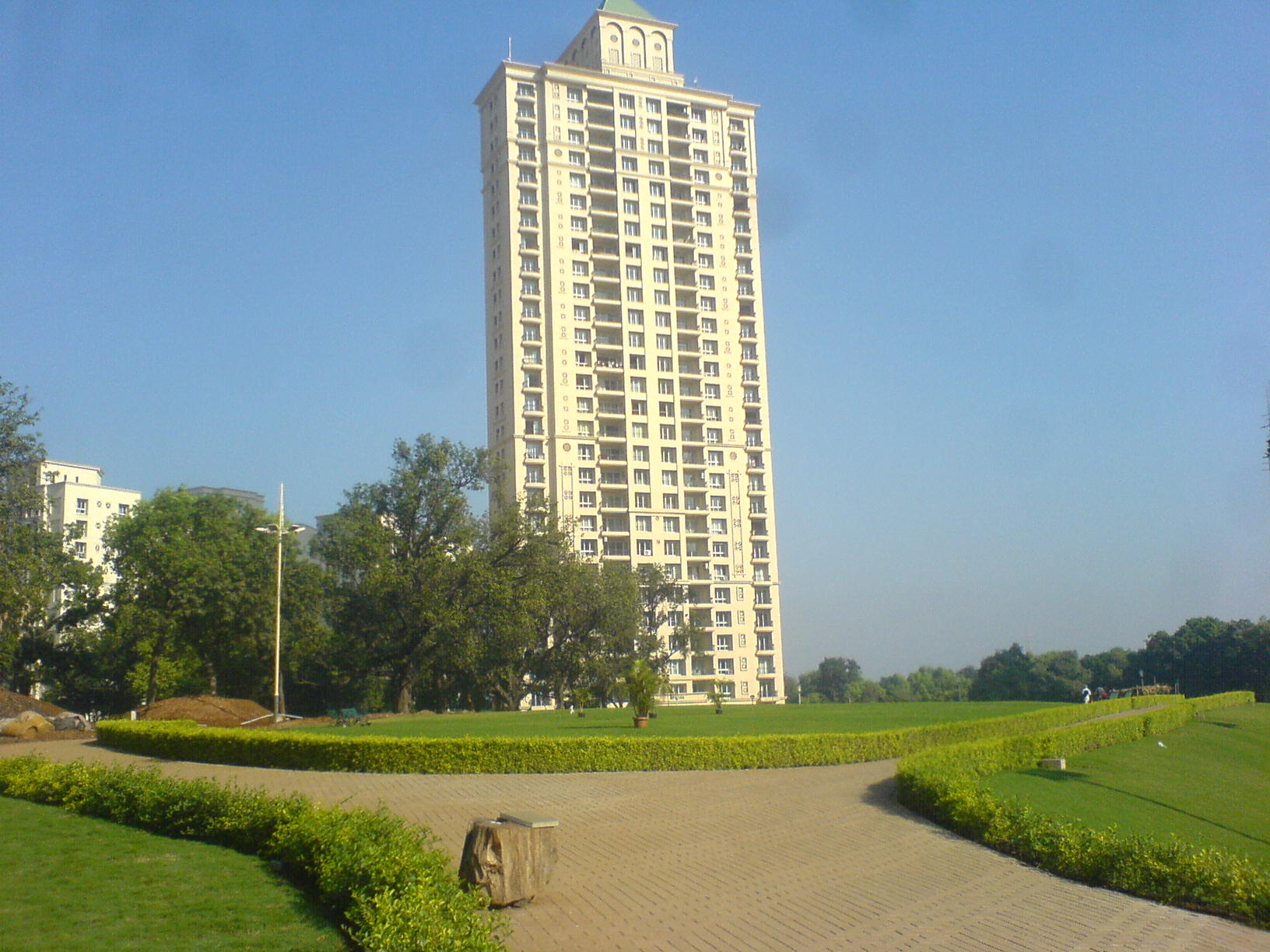
Jogger's Park, 2008

Jogger's Park is a seaside jogging track along with a park, in Bandra, Mumbai. It is situated at the southern end of Carter Road. The park was opened to the public on 27 May 1990 and receives more than 2,000 visitors on weekdays and double the number on Sundays. Its jogging track is 400 metres long. It features a mud strip for running and two paved tracks for walking or jogging.

Development of the park is credited to the city's veteran hockey coach and former corporator, Oliver Andrade. Andrade's effort to rope in film star Dilip Kumar and Sunil Dutt, transformed the site from a dumping ground into a jogging track. The movie stars fund raising efforts led to financial assistance from the Rahejas, the Lokhandwalas, and the Rizvi builders at a cost of ₹4 crore.

On 11 February 2022, the BMC passed a proposal to rename the Jogger's Park as Sir Oliver Andrade Park.
